= List of teams and cyclists in the 2016 Tour de France =

List of cyclists

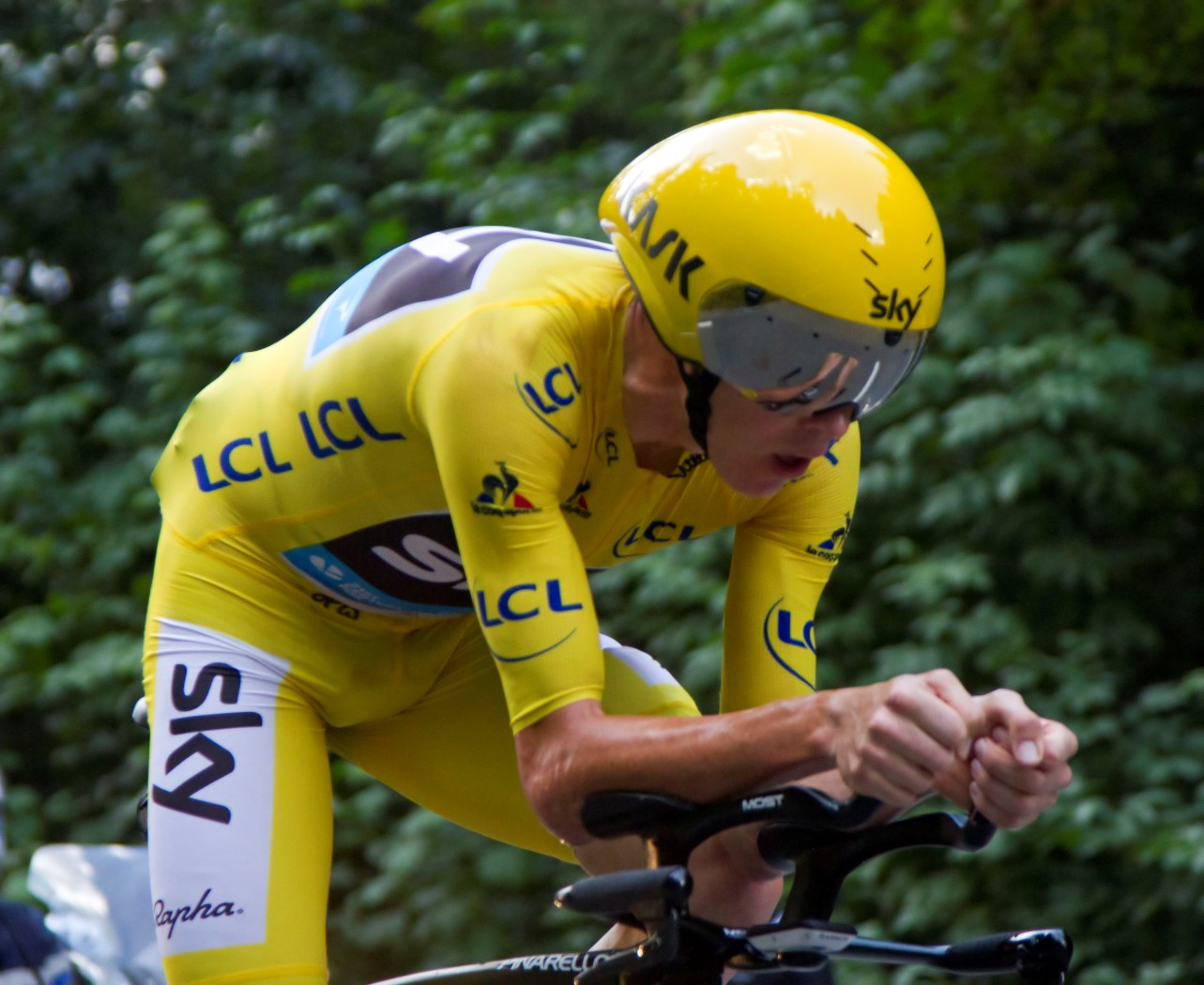
Chris Froome, winner of the 2016 Tour de France, wearing the race leader's yellow jersey on stage 18's individual time trial stage.

The 2016 Tour de France was the 103rd edition of the race, one of cycling's Grand Tours. The 21-stage race took place from 2 to 24 July 2016, starting in Mont Saint-Michel in Normandy and finishing on the Champs-Élysées in Paris. All eighteen Union Cycliste Internationale (UCI) WorldTeams were automatically invited and were obliged to attend the race. In March 2016, four UCI Professional Continental teams were given wildcard places into the race by the organiser – Amaury Sport Organisation (ASO) – to complete the 22-team peloton. As each team was entitled to enter nine riders, the peloton on the first stage consisted of 198 riders from 35 countries. France, Spain, the Netherlands, Belgium, Italy and Germany all had ten or more riders competing in the race.

The number of riders per nation participated in the 2016 Tour de France: 20+ / 10–19 / 2–9 / 1

The final stage in Paris was contested by 174 riders, with 24 of the riders failing to finish the race, a record low number of withdrawals. The race was won by Chris Froome (Team Sky), the champion from both the 2013 Tour and the 2015 Tour. Froome first took the lead of the race following the eighth stage after attacking on the descent into Bagnères-de-Luchon. He extended his lead on stages 11 and 13 before further extending his lead in the Alps to win his third Tour de France. Frenchman Romain Bardet (AG2R La Mondiale) finished second, 4 minutes and 5 seconds behind Froome, with Nairo Quintana (Movistar Team) third. Adam Yates (Orica–BikeExchange) won the competition for the best young rider. The points classification was won for the fifth consecutive year by Peter Sagan (Tinkoff), who also won the combativity award. Rafał Majka (Tinkoff) of Poland won the mountains classification, while Movistar won the team classification. In the lists below the teams are listed in order of the race number worn by its cyclists.

== Teams ==
The 18 UCI WorldTeams were automatically invited to participate in the Tour. In addition, Amaury Sport Organisation (ASO), the race organiser, invited four wildcard team, Bora–Argon 18, Cofidis, Direct Énergie and Fortuneo–Vital Concept. Three of the teams (Cofidis, Direct Énergie and Fortuneo–Vital Concept) are French while Bora–Argon 18 is German. The 2016 Tour de France was the third consecutive Tour de France that Bora–Argon 18 and Fortuneo–Vital Concept had been invited to compete as a wildcard. After the wildcard announcement, Bora–Argon 18's team manager, Ralph Denk, said, "These are great news today! [sic], To be invited for the third time in a row to the world's biggest cycling event is a big honour, and I want to thank the ASO for their trust in us."

UCI WorldTeams

- Team Sky (riders)
- Movistar Team (riders)
- Astana (riders)
- Tinkoff (riders)
- AG2R La Mondiale (riders)
- LottoNL–Jumbo (riders)
- Trek–Segafredo (riders)
- IAM Cycling (riders)
- Cannondale–Drapac (riders)
- BMC Racing Team (riders)
- Team Dimension Data (riders)
- Team Giant–Alpecin (riders)
- FDJ (riders)
- Team Katusha (riders)
- Lampre–Merida (riders)
- Lotto–Soudal (riders)
- Etixx–Quick-Step (riders)
- Orica–BikeExchange (riders)

UCI Professional Continental teams

- Bora–Argon 18 (riders)
- Direct Énergie (riders)
- Cofidis (riders)
- Fortuneo–Vital Concept (riders)

== Cyclists ==
Legend
No.	Starting number worn by the rider during the Tour
Pos.	Position in the general classification
Time	Deficit to the winner of the general classification
‡	Denotes riders born on or after 1 January 1991 eligible for the young rider classification
General classification	Denotes the winner of the general classification. The winner, Chris Froome, has his full race time listed.
Points classification	Denotes the winner of the points classification
Mountains classification	Denotes the winner of the mountains classification
Young rider classification	Denotes the winner of the young rider classification (eligibility indicated by ‡)
Team classification	Denotes riders that represent the winner of the team classification
Super-combativity award	Denotes the winner of the super-combativity award
DNS	Denotes a rider who did not start a stage, followed by the stage before which he withdrew
DNF	Denotes a rider who did not finish a stage, followed by the stage in which he withdrew
DSQ	Denotes a rider who was disqualified from the race, followed by the stage in which this occurred
Age correct as of 2 July 2016, the date on which the Tour began

=== By starting number ===
Note: As each team used numbers from 1 to 9; 11 to 19; 21 to 29 etc., there were no race numbers ending in 0. This is so all the team leaders had a race number ending in "1". (Note: The race numbers were handed out based on the team leader's result in the 2015 Tour de France. The better the team leader did in the 2015 Tour, the lower the race numbers handed to his team. For example, Team Sky were given numbers 1 to 9 due to Chris Froome winning the 2015 Tour.)

No.	Name	Nationality	Team	Age	Pos.	Time	Ref
1	Chris Froome	Great Britain	Team Sky	31	1	89h 04'48"	
2	Sergio Henao	Colombia	Team Sky	28	12	+ 18' 15"	
3	Vasil Kiryienka	Belarus	Team Sky	35	103	+ 3h 38' 41"	
4	Mikel Landa	Spain	Team Sky	26	35	+ 1h 32' 19"	
5	Mikel Nieve	Spain	Team Sky	32	17	+ 38' 30"	
6	Wout Poels	Netherlands	Team Sky	28	28	+ 1h 06' 57"	
7	Luke Rowe	Great Britain	Team Sky	26	151	+ 4h 27' 49"	
8	Ian Stannard	Great Britain	Team Sky	29	161	+ 4h 31' 34"	
9	Geraint Thomas	Great Britain	Team Sky	30	15	+ 28' 31"	
11	Nairo Quintana	Colombia	Movistar Team	26	3	+ 4' 21"	
12	Alejandro Valverde	Spain	Movistar Team	36	6	+ 6' 16"	
13	Winner Anacona	Colombia	Movistar Team	27	69	+ 2h 50' 23"	
14	Imanol Erviti	Spain	Movistar Team	32	108	+ 3h 46' 42"	
15	Jesús Herrada	Spain	Movistar Team	25	DNF-15	—	
16	Gorka Izagirre	Spain	Movistar Team	28	DNF-17	—	
17	Jon Izagirre	Spain	Movistar Team	27	47	+ 2h 09' 49"	
18	Daniel Moreno	Spain	Movistar Team	34	31	+ 1h 21' 00"	
19	Nelson Oliveira	Portugal	Movistar Team	27	80	+ 3h 04' 53"	
21	Fabio Aru	Italy	Astana	25	13	+ 19' 20"	
22	Vincenzo Nibali	Italy	Astana	31	30	+ 1h 19' 59"	
23	Jakob Fuglsang	Denmark	Astana	31	52	+ 2h 17' 16"	
24	Andriy Hrivko	Ukraine	Astana	32	86	+ 3h 14' 31"	
25	Tanel Kangert	Estonia	Astana	29	26	+ 1h 03' 59"	
26	Alexey Lutsenko ‡	Kazakhstan	Astana	23	62	+ 2h 41' 52"	
27	Diego Rosa	Italy	Astana	27	37	+ 1h 46' 36"	
28	Luis León Sánchez	Spain	Astana	32	48	+ 2h 09' 49"	
29	Paolo Tiralongo	Italy	Astana	38	74	+ 2h 58' 12"	
31	Alberto Contador	Spain	Tinkoff	33	DNF-9	—	
32	Peter Sagan	Slovakia	Tinkoff	26	95	+ 3h 27' 09"	
33	Maciej Bodnar	Poland	Tinkoff	31	159	+ 4h 30' 30"	
34	Oscar Gatto	Italy	Tinkoff	31	156	+ 4h 29' 38"	
35	Robert Kišerlovski	Croatia	Tinkoff	29	58	+ 2h 28' 06"	
36	Roman Kreuziger	Czech Republic	Tinkoff	30	10	+ 7' 11"	
37	Rafał Majka	Poland	Tinkoff	26	27	+ 1h 04' 25"	
38	Matteo Tosatto	Italy	Tinkoff	42	145	+ 4h 22' 05"	
39	Michael Valgren ‡	Denmark	Tinkoff	24	77	+ 3h 01' 22"	
41	Romain Bardet	France	AG2R La Mondiale	25	2	+ 4' 05"	
42	Jan Bakelants	Belgium	AG2R La Mondiale	30	50	+ 2h 13' 47"	
43	Mikaël Cherel	France	AG2R La Mondiale	30	57	+ 2h 27' 45"	
44	Samuel Dumoulin	France	AG2R La Mondiale	35	130	+ 4h 08' 08"	
45	Ben Gastauer	Luxembourg	AG2R La Mondiale	28	61	+ 2h 41' 05"	
46	Cyril Gautier	France	AG2R La Mondiale	28	68	+ 2h 49' 49"	
47	Alexis Gougeard ‡	France	AG2R La Mondiale	23	147	+ 4h 23' 42"	
48	Domenico Pozzovivo	Italy	AG2R La Mondiale	33	33	+ 1h 25' 14"	
49	Alexis Vuillermoz	France	AG2R La Mondiale	28	20	+ 42' 28"	
51	Wilco Kelderman ‡	Netherlands	LottoNL–Jumbo	25	32	+ 1h 24' 38"	
52	George Bennett	New Zealand	LottoNL–Jumbo	26	53	+ 2h 18' 05"	
53	Dylan Groenewegen ‡	Netherlands	LottoNL–Jumbo	23	160	+ 4h 30' 34"	
54	Bert-Jan Lindeman	Netherlands	LottoNL–Jumbo	27	94	+ 3h 26' 19"	
55	Paul Martens	Germany	LottoNL–Jumbo	32	98	+ 3h 33' 29"	
56	Timo Roosen ‡	Netherlands	LottoNL–Jumbo	23	111	+ 3h 50' 43"	
57	Sep Vanmarcke	Belgium	LottoNL–Jumbo	27	104	+ 3h 40' 02"	
58	Robert Wagner	Germany	LottoNL–Jumbo	33	163	+ 4h 32' 09"	
59	Maarten Wynants	Belgium	LottoNL–Jumbo	34	138	+ 4h 16' 53"	
61	Bauke Mollema	Netherlands	Trek–Segafredo	29	11	+ 13' 13"	
62	Fabian Cancellara	Switzerland	Trek–Segafredo	35	DNS-18	—	
63	Markel Irizar	Spain	Trek–Segafredo	36	120	+ 3h 58' 17"	
64	Grégory Rast	Switzerland	Trek–Segafredo	36	123	+ 4h 03' 44"	
65	Fränk Schleck	Luxembourg	Trek–Segafredo	36	34	+ 1h 27' 39"	
66	Peter Stetina	United States	Trek–Segafredo	28	46	+ 2h 07' 22"	
67	Jasper Stuyven ‡	Belgium	Trek–Segafredo	24	99	+ 3h 33' 29"	
68	Edward Theuns ‡	Belgium	Trek–Segafredo	25	DNF-13	—	
69	Haimar Zubeldia	Spain	Trek–Segafredo	39	24	+ 53' 06"	
71	Mathias Frank	Switzerland	IAM Cycling	29	DNF-14	—	
72	Stef Clement	Netherlands	IAM Cycling	33	18	+ 38' 47"	
73	Jérôme Coppel	France	IAM Cycling	29	75	+ 2h 58' 48"	
74	Martin Elmiger	Switzerland	IAM Cycling	37	64	+ 2h 44' 01"	
75	Sondre Holst Enger ‡	Norway	IAM Cycling	22	141	+ 4h 17' 32"	
76	Reto Hollenstein	Switzerland	IAM Cycling	30	97	+ 3h 28' 33"	
77	Leigh Howard	Australia	IAM Cycling	26	172	+ 4h 55' 13"	
78	Oliver Naesen	Belgium	IAM Cycling	25	83	+ 3h 11' 28"	
79	Jarlinson Pantano	Colombia	IAM Cycling	27	19	+ 38' 59"	
81	Pierre Rolland	France	Cannondale–Drapac	29	16	+ 30' 42"	
82	Matti Breschel	Denmark	Cannondale–Drapac	31	DNF-14	—	
83	Lawson Craddock ‡	United States	Cannondale–Drapac	24	124	+ 4h 03' 44"	
84	Alex Howes	United States	Cannondale–Drapac	28	131	+ 4h 08' 22"	
85	Kristijan Koren	Slovenia	Cannondale–Drapac	29	152	+ 4h 28' 01"	
86	Sebastian Langeveld	Netherlands	Cannondale–Drapac	31	DNF-10	—	
87	Ramūnas Navardauskas	Lithuania	Cannondale–Drapac	28	134	+ 4h 09' 40"	
88	Tom-Jelte Slagter	Netherlands	Cannondale–Drapac	27	82	+ 3h 09' 19"	
89	Dylan van Baarle ‡	Netherlands	Cannondale–Drapac	23	91	+ 3h 23' 15"	
91	Richie Porte	Australia	BMC Racing Team	31	5	+ 5' 17"	
92	Brent Bookwalter	United States	BMC Racing Team	32	117	+ 3h 57' 49"	
93	Marcus Burghardt	Germany	BMC Racing Team	33	89	+ 3h 20' 22"	
94	Damiano Caruso	Italy	BMC Racing Team	28	22	+ 48' 23"	
95	Rohan Dennis	Australia	BMC Racing Team	26	DNS-17	—	
96	Amaël Moinard	France	BMC Racing Team	34	45	+ 2h 06' 36"	
97	Michael Schär	Switzerland	BMC Racing Team	29	76	+ 3h 00' 54"	
98	Greg Van Avermaet	Belgium	BMC Racing Team	31	44	+ 2h 06' 13"	
99	Tejay van Garderen	United States	BMC Racing Team	27	29	+ 1h 12' 06"	
101	Mark Cavendish	Great Britain	Team Dimension Data	31	DNS-17	—	
102	Natnael Berhane ‡	Eritrea	Team Dimension Data	25	125	+ 4h 04' 27"	
103	Edvald Boasson Hagen	Norway	Team Dimension Data	29	109	+ 3h 47' 29"	
104	Steve Cummings	Great Britain	Team Dimension Data	35	140	+ 4h 17' 03"	
105	Bernhard Eisel	Austria	Team Dimension Data	35	171	+ 4h 51' 07"	
106	Reinardt Janse van Rensburg	South Africa	Team Dimension Data	27	115	+ 3h 56' 30"	
107	Serge Pauwels	Belgium	Team Dimension Data	32	42	+ 2h 00' 38"	
108	Mark Renshaw	Australia	Team Dimension Data	33	DNF-9	—	
109	Daniel Teklehaimanot	Eritrea	Team Dimension Data	27	85	+ 3h 14' 07"	
111	Warren Barguil ‡	France	Team Giant–Alpecin	24	23	+ 52' 14"	
112	Roy Curvers	Netherlands	Team Giant–Alpecin	36	122	+ 4h 03' 16"	
113	John Degenkolb	Germany	Team Giant–Alpecin	27	148	+ 4h 24' 24"	
114	Tom Dumoulin	Netherlands	Team Giant–Alpecin	25	DNF-19	—	
115	Simon Geschke	Germany	Team Giant–Alpecin	30	66	+ 2h 47' 32"	
116	Georg Preidler	Austria	Team Giant–Alpecin	26	56	+ 2h 25' 45"	
117	Ramon Sinkeldam	Netherlands	Team Giant–Alpecin	27	143	+ 4h 21' 41"	
118	Laurens ten Dam	Netherlands	Team Giant–Alpecin	35	73	+ 2h 53' 22"	
119	Albert Timmer	Netherlands	Team Giant–Alpecin	31	153	+ 4h 28' 11"	
121	Thibaut Pinot	France	FDJ	26	DNS-13	—	
122	William Bonnet	France	FDJ	34	127	+ 4h 06' 18"	
123	Mathieu Ladagnous	France	FDJ	31	DNF-9	—	
124	Steve Morabito	Switzerland	FDJ	33	36	+ 1h 38' 30"	
125	Cédric Pineau	France	FDJ	31	DNF-9	—	
126	Sébastien Reichenbach	Switzerland	FDJ	27	14	+ 24' 59"	
127	Anthony Roux	France	FDJ	29	63	+ 2h 43' 51"	
128	Jérémy Roy	France	FDJ	33	96	+ 3h 27' 15"	
129	Arthur Vichot	France	FDJ	27	78	+ 3h 02' 10"	
131	Emanuel Buchmann ‡	Germany	Bora–Argon 18	23	21	+ 47' 40"	
132	Shane Archbold	New Zealand	Bora–Argon 18	27	DNS-18	—	
133	Jan Bárta	Czech Republic	Bora–Argon 18	31	88	+ 3h 19' 44"	
134	Cesare Benedetti	Italy	Bora–Argon 18	28	128	+ 4h 06' 23"	
135	Sam Bennett	Ireland	Bora–Argon 18	25	174	+ 5h 17' 14"	
136	Bartosz Huzarski	Poland	Bora–Argon 18	35	39	+ 1h 55' 28"	
137	Patrick Konrad ‡	Austria	Bora–Argon 18	24	65	+ 2h 46' 32"	
138	Andreas Schillinger	Germany	Bora–Argon 18	32	154	+ 4h 28' 33"	
139	Paul Voss	Germany	Bora–Argon 18	30	101	+ 3h 36' 25"	
141	Joaquim Rodríguez	Spain	Team Katusha	37	7	+ 6' 58"	
142	Jacopo Guarnieri	Italy	Team Katusha	28	165	+ 4h 43' 45"	
143	Marco Haller ‡	Austria	Team Katusha	25	162	+ 4h 31' 40"	
144	Alexander Kristoff	Norway	Team Katusha	28	149	+ 4h 24' 24"	
145	Alberto Losada	Spain	Team Katusha	34	67	+ 2h 48' 02"	
146	Michael Mørkøv	Denmark	Team Katusha	31	DNF-8	—	
147	Jurgen Van den Broeck	Belgium	Team Katusha	33	DNS-12	—	
148	Ángel Vicioso	Spain	Team Katusha	38	129	+ 4h 08' 07"	
149	Ilnur Zakarin	Russia	Team Katusha	26	25	+ 56' 33"	
151	Rui Costa	Portugal	Lampre–Merida	29	49	+ 2h 11' 42"	
152	Yukiya Arashiro	Japan	Lampre–Merida	31	116	+ 3h 57' 06"	
153	Matteo Bono	Italy	Lampre–Merida	32	136	+ 4h 12' 53"	
154	Davide Cimolai	Italy	Lampre–Merida	26	168	+ 4h 39' 37"	
155	Kristijan Đurasek	Croatia	Lampre–Merida	28	51	+ 2h 15' 16"	
156	Tsgabu Grmay ‡	Ethiopia	Lampre–Merida	24	92	+ 3h 23' 17"	
157	Louis Meintjes ‡	South Africa	Lampre–Merida	24	8	+ 6' 58"	
158	Luka Pibernik ‡	Slovenia	Lampre–Merida	22	102	+ 3h 38' 17"	
159	Jan Polanc ‡	Slovenia	Lampre–Merida	24	54	+ 2h 18' 24"	
161	André Greipel	Germany	Lotto–Soudal	33	133	+ 4h 09' 07"	
162	Lars Bak	Denmark	Lotto–Soudal	36	173	+ 5h 01' 18"	
163	Thomas De Gendt	Belgium	Lotto–Soudal	29	40	+ 1h 58' 45"	
164	Jens Debusschere	Belgium	Lotto–Soudal	26	DNS-15	—	
165	Tony Gallopin	France	Lotto–Soudal	28	71	+ 2h 51' 23"	
166	Adam Hansen	Australia	Lotto–Soudal	35	100	+ 3h 34' 26"	
167	Greg Henderson	New Zealand	Lotto–Soudal	39	155	+ 4h 29' 22"	
168	Jürgen Roelandts	Belgium	Lotto–Soudal	31	126	+ 4h 05' 22"	
169	Marcel Sieberg	Germany	Lotto–Soudal	34	169	+ 4h 20' 24"	
171	Bryan Coquard ‡	France	Direct Énergie	24	113	+ 3h 51' 57"	
172	Sylvain Chavanel	France	Direct Énergie	37	43	+ 2h 02' 53"	
173	Antoine Duchesne ‡	Canada	Direct Énergie	24	107	+ 3h 44' 54"	
174	Yohann Gène	France	Direct Énergie	35	158	+ 4h 30' 02"	
175	Fabrice Jeandesboz	France	Direct Énergie	31	60	+ 2h 39' 17"	
176	Adrien Petit	France	Direct Énergie	25	164	+ 4h 32' 25"	
177	Romain Sicard	France	Direct Énergie	28	81	+ 3h 09' 11"	
178	Angelo Tulik	France	Direct Énergie	25	DNF-12	—	
179	Thomas Voeckler	France	Direct Énergie	37	79	+ 3h 02' 35"	
181	Marcel Kittel	Germany	Etixx–Quick-Step	28	166	+ 4h 35' 06"	
182	Julian Alaphilippe ‡	France	Etixx–Quick-Step	24	41	+ 2h 00' 09"	
183	Iljo Keisse	Belgium	Etixx–Quick-Step	33	139	+ 4h 16' 57"	
184	Daniel Martin	Ireland	Etixx–Quick-Step	29	9	+ 7' 04"	
185	Tony Martin	Germany	Etixx–Quick-Step	31	DNF-21	—	
186	Maximiliano Richeze	Argentina	Etixx–Quick-Step	33	144	+ 4h 22' 02"	
187	Fabio Sabatini	Italy	Etixx–Quick-Step	31	150	+ 4h 26' 39"	
188	Petr Vakoč ‡	Czech Republic	Etixx–Quick-Step	23	118	+ 4h 16' 57"	
189	Julien Vermote	Belgium	Etixx–Quick-Step	26	114	+ 3h 52' 50"	
191	Daniel Navarro	Spain	Cofidis	32	DNF-19	—	
192	Borut Božič	Slovenia	Cofidis	35	DNF-17	—	
193	Jérôme Cousin	France	Cofidis	27	121	+ 3h 58' 36"	
194	Nicolas Edet	France	Cofidis	28	106	+ 3h 42' 42"	
195	Arnold Jeannesson	France	Cofidis	30	87	+ 3h 18' 14"	
196	Christophe Laporte ‡	France	Cofidis	23	157	+ 4h 29' 47"	
197	Cyril Lemoine	France	Cofidis	33	137	+ 4h 13' 49"	
198	Luis Ángel Maté	Spain	Cofidis	32	55	+ 2h 21' 17"	
199	Geoffrey Soupe	France	Cofidis	28	142	+ 4h 18' 15"	
201	Simon Gerrans	Australia	Orica–BikeExchange	36	DNS-13	—	
202	Michael Albasini	Switzerland	Orica–BikeExchange	35	132	+ 4h 09' 04"	
203	Luke Durbridge ‡	Australia	Orica–BikeExchange	25	112	+ 3h 51' 55"	
204	Mathew Hayman	Australia	Orica–BikeExchange	38	135	+ 4h 10' 33"	
205	Daryl Impey	South Africa	Orica–BikeExchange	31	38	+ 1h 50' 51"	
206	Christopher Juul-Jensen	Denmark	Orica–BikeExchange	26	119	+ 3h 58' 10"	
207	Michael Matthews	Australia	Orica–BikeExchange	25	110	+ 4h 16' 57"	
208	Rubén Plaza	Spain	Orica–BikeExchange	36	72	+ 2h 53' 10"	
209	Adam Yates ‡	Great Britain	Orica–BikeExchange	23	4	+ 4' 42"	
211	Eduardo Sepúlveda ‡	Argentina	Fortuneo–Vital Concept	25	59	+ 4h 16' 57"	
212	Vegard Breen	Norway	Fortuneo–Vital Concept	26	167	+ 4h 38' 27"	
213	Anthony Delaplace	France	Fortuneo–Vital Concept	26	90	+ 3h 21' 09"	
214	Brice Feillu	France	Fortuneo–Vital Concept	30	70	+ 2h 50' 49"	
215	Armindo Fonseca	France	Fortuneo–Vital Concept	27	146	+ 4h 23' 01"	
216	Daniel McLay ‡	Great Britain	Fortuneo–Vital Concept	24	170	+ 4h 50' 14"	
217	Pierre-Luc Périchon	France	Fortuneo–Vital Concept	29	93	+ 3h 24' 36"	
218	Chris Anker Sørensen	Denmark	Fortuneo–Vital Concept	31	84	+ 3h 12' 52"	
219	Florian Vachon	France	Fortuneo–Vital Concept	31	105	+ 3h 40' 09"	

=== By team ===
Team Sky (SKY)
No.	Rider	Pos.
1	Chris Froome (GBR)	1
2	Sergio Henao (COL)	12
3	Vasil Kiryienka (BLR)	103
4	Mikel Landa (ESP)	35
5	Mikel Nieve (ESP)	17
6	Wout Poels (NED)	28
7	Luke Rowe (GBR)	151
8	Ian Stannard (GBR)	161
9	Geraint Thomas (GBR)	15
Directeur sportif: Nicolas Portal

Movistar Team (MOV)
No.	Rider	Pos.
11	Nairo Quintana (COL)	3
12	Alejandro Valverde (ESP)	6
13	Winner Anacona (COL)	69
14	Imanol Erviti (ESP)	108
15	Jesús Herrada (ESP)	DNF-15
16	Gorka Izagirre (ESP)	DNF-17
17	Jon Izagirre (ESP)	47
18	Daniel Moreno (ESP)	31
19	Nelson Oliveira (POR)	80
Directeur sportif: José Luis Arrieta

Astana (AST)
No.	Rider	Pos.
21	Fabio Aru (ITA)	13
22	Vincenzo Nibali (ITA)	30
23	Jakob Fuglsang (DEN)	52
24	Andriy Hrivko (UKR)	86
25	Tanel Kangert (EST)	26
26	Alexey Lutsenko (KAZ) ‡	62
27	Diego Rosa (ITA)	37
28	Luis León Sánchez (ESP)	48
29	Paolo Tiralongo (ITA)	74
Directeur sportif: Dmitriy Fofonov

Tinkoff (TNK)
No.	Rider	Pos.
31	Alberto Contador (ESP)	DNF-9
32	Peter Sagan (SVK)	95
33	Maciej Bodnar (POL)	159
34	Oscar Gatto (ITA)	156
35	Robert Kišerlovski (CRO)	58
36	Roman Kreuziger (CZE)	10
37	Rafał Majka (POL)	27
38	Matteo Tosatto (ITA)	145
39	Michael Valgren (DEN) ‡	77
Directeur sportif: Steven de Jongh

AG2R La Mondiale (ALM)
No.	Rider	Pos.
41	Romain Bardet (FRA)	2
42	Jan Bakelants (BEL)	50
43	Mikaël Cherel (FRA)	57
44	Samuel Dumoulin (FRA)	130
45	Ben Gastauer (LUX)	65
46	Cyril Gautier (FRA)	68
47	Alexis Gougeard (FRA) ‡	147
48	Domenico Pozzovivo (ITA)	33
49	Alexis Vuillermoz (FRA)	20
Directeur sportif: Julien Jurdie

LottoNL–Jumbo (TLJ)
No.	Rider	Pos.
51	Wilco Kelderman (NED) ‡	32
52	George Bennett (NZL)	53
53	Dylan Groenewegen (NED) ‡	160
54	Bert-Jan Lindeman (NED)	94
55	Paul Martens (GER)	98
56	Timo Roosen (NED) ‡	111
57	Sep Vanmarcke (BEL)	104
58	Robert Wagner (GER)	163
59	Maarten Wynants (BEL)	138
Directeur sportif: Merijn Zeeman

Trek–Segafredo (TFS)
No.	Rider	Pos.
61	Bauke Mollema (NED)	11
62	Fabian Cancellara (SUI)	DNS-18
63	Markel Irizar (ESP)	120
64	Grégory Rast (SUI)	123
65	Fränk Schleck (LUX)	34
66	Peter Stetina (USA)	46
67	Jasper Stuyven (BEL) ‡	99
68	Edward Theuns (BEL) ‡	DNF-13
69	Haimar Zubeldia (ESP)	24
Directeur sportif: Kim Andersen

IAM Cycling (IAM)
No.	Rider	Pos.
71	Mathias Frank (SUI)	DNF-14
72	Stef Clement (NED)	18
73	Jérôme Coppel (FRA)	75
74	Martin Elmiger (SUI)	64
75	Sondre Holst Enger (NOR) ‡	141
76	Reto Hollenstein (SUI)	97
77	Leigh Howard (AUS)	172
78	Oliver Naesen (BEL)	83
79	Jarlinson Pantano (COL)	19
Directeur sportif: Kjell Carlström

Cannondale–Drapac (CDT)
No.	Rider	Pos.
81	Pierre Rolland (FRA)	16
82	Matti Breschel (DEN)	DNF-14
83	Lawson Craddock (USA) ‡	124
84	Alex Howes (USA)	131
85	Kristijan Koren (SLO)	152
86	Sebastian Langeveld (NED)	DNF-10
87	Ramūnas Navardauskas (LTU)	134
88	Tom-Jelte Slagter (NED)	82
89	Dylan van Baarle (NED) ‡	91
Directeur sportif: Charly Wegelius

BMC Racing Team (BMC)
No.	Rider	Pos.
91	Richie Porte (AUS)	5
92	Brent Bookwalter (USA)	117
93	Marcus Burghardt (GER)	89
94	Damiano Caruso (ITA)	22
95	Rohan Dennis (AUS)	DNS-17
96	Amaël Moinard (FRA)	45
97	Michael Schär (SUI)	76
98	Greg Van Avermaet (BEL)	44
99	Tejay van Garderen (USA)	29
Directeur sportif: Yvon Ledanois

Team Dimension Data (DDD)
No.	Rider	Pos.
101	Mark Cavendish (GBR)	DNS-17
102	Natnael Berhane (ERI) ‡	125
103	Edvald Boasson Hagen (NOR)	109
104	Steve Cummings (GBR)	140
105	Bernhard Eisel (AUT)	171
106	Reinardt Janse van Rensburg (RSA)	115
107	Serge Pauwels (BEL)	42
108	Mark Renshaw (AUS)	DNF-9
109	Daniel Teklehaimanot (ERI)	85
Directeur sportif: Roger Hammond

Team Giant–Alpecin (TGA)
No.	Rider	Pos.
111	Warren Barguil (FRA) ‡	23
112	Roy Curvers (NED)	122
113	John Degenkolb (GER)	148
114	Tom Dumoulin (NED)	DNS-18
115	Simon Geschke (GER)	66
116	Georg Preidler (AUT)	56
117	Ramon Sinkeldam (NED)	143
118	Laurens ten Dam (NED)	73
119	Albert Timmer (NED)	153
Directeur sportif: Marc Reef

FDJ (FDJ)
No.	Rider	Pos.
121	Thibaut Pinot (FRA)	DNS-13
122	William Bonnet (FRA)	127
123	Mathieu Ladagnous (FRA)	DNF-9
124	Steve Morabito (SUI)	36
125	Cédric Pineau (FRA)	DNF-9
126	Sébastien Reichenbach (SUI)	14
127	Anthony Roux (FRA)	63
128	Jérémy Roy (FRA)	96
129	Arthur Vichot (FRA)	78
Directeur sportif: Yvon Madiot

Bora–Argon 18 (BOA)
No.	Rider	Pos.
131	Emanuel Buchmann (GER) ‡	21
132	Shane Archbold (NZL)	DNS-18
133	Jan Bárta (CZE)	88
134	Cesare Benedetti (ITA)	128
135	Sam Bennett (IRL)	174
136	Bartosz Huzarski (POL)	39
137	Patrick Konrad (AUT) ‡	65
138	Andreas Schillinger (GER)	154
139	Paul Voss (GER)	101
Directeur sportif: Enrico Poitschke

Team Katusha (KAT)
No.	Rider	Pos.
141	Joaquim Rodríguez (ESP)	7
142	Jacopo Guarnieri (ITA)	165
143	Marco Haller (AUT)	162
144	Alexander Kristoff (NOR)	149
145	Alberto Losada (ESP)	67
146	Michael Mørkøv (DEN)	DNF-8
147	Jurgen Van den Broeck (BEL)	DNS-12
148	Ángel Vicioso (ESP)	129
149	Ilnur Zakarin (RUS)	25
Directeur sportif: José Azevedo

Lampre–Merida (LAM)
No.	Rider	Pos.
151	Rui Costa (POR)	49
152	Yukiya Arashiro (JPN)	116
153	Matteo Bono (ITA)	136
154	Davide Cimolai (ITA)	168
155	Kristijan Đurasek (CRO)	51
156	Tsgabu Grmay (ETH) ‡	92
157	Louis Meintjes (RSA) ‡	8
158	Luka Pibernik (SLO) ‡	102
159	Jan Polanc (SLO) ‡	54
Directeur sportif: Philippe Mauduit

Lotto–Soudal (LTS)
No.	Rider	Pos.
161	André Greipel (GER)	133
162	Lars Bak (DEN)	173
163	Thomas De Gendt (BEL)	40
164	Jens Debusschere (BEL)	DNS-15
165	Tony Gallopin (FRA)	71
166	Adam Hansen (AUS)	100
167	Greg Henderson (NZL)	155
168	Jürgen Roelandts (BEL)	126
169	Marcel Sieberg (GER)	169
Directeur sportif: Herman Frison

Direct Énergie (DEN)
No.	Rider	Pos.
171	Bryan Coquard (FRA) ‡	113
172	Sylvain Chavanel (FRA)	43
173	Antoine Duchesne (CAN) ‡	107
174	Yohann Gène (FRA)	158
175	Fabrice Jeandesboz (FRA)	60
176	Adrien Petit (FRA)	164
177	Romain Sicard (FRA)	81
178	Angelo Tulik (FRA)	DNF-12
179	Thomas Voeckler (FRA)	79
Directeur sportif: Jimmy Engoulvent

Etixx–Quick-Step (EQS)
No.	Rider	Pos.
181	Marcel Kittel (GER)	166
182	Julian Alaphilippe (FRA) ‡	41
183	Iljo Keisse (BEL)	139
184	Daniel Martin (IRL)	9
185	Tony Martin (GER)	DNF-21
186	Maximiliano Richeze (ARG)	144
187	Fabio Sabatini (ITA)	150
188	Petr Vakoč (CZE)	118
189	Julien Vermote (BEL)	114
Directeur sportif: Tom Steels

Cofidis (COF)
No.	Rider	Pos.
191	Daniel Navarro (ESP)	DNF-19
192	Borut Božič (SLO)	DNF-17
193	Jérôme Cousin (FRA)	121
194	Nicolas Edet (FRA)	106
195	Arnold Jeannesson (FRA)	87
196	Christophe Laporte (FRA) ‡	157
197	Cyril Lemoine (FRA)	137
198	Luis Ángel Maté (ESP)	55
199	Geoffrey Soupe (FRA)	142
Directeur sportif: Didier Rous

Orica–BikeExchange (OBE)
No.	Rider	Pos.
201	Simon Gerrans (AUS)	DNS-13
202	Michael Albasini (SUI)	132
203	Luke Durbridge (AUS) ‡	112
204	Mathew Hayman (AUS)	135
205	Daryl Impey (RSA)	38
206	Christopher Juul-Jensen (DEN)	119
207	Michael Matthews (AUS)	110
208	Rubén Plaza (ESP)	72
209	Adam Yates (GBR) ‡	4
Directeur sportif: Matthew White

Fortuneo–Vital Concept (FVC)
No.	Rider	Pos.
211	Eduardo Sepúlveda (ARG) ‡	59
212	Vegard Breen (NOR)	167
213	Anthony Delaplace (FRA)	90
214	Brice Feillu (FRA)	70
215	Armindo Fonseca (FRA)	146
216	Daniel McLay (GBR) ‡	170
217	Pierre-Luc Périchon (FRA)	93
218	Chris Anker Sørensen (DEN)	84
219	Florian Vachon (FRA)	105
Directeur sportif: Sébastien Hinault

=== By nationality ===
The 198 riders that competed in the 2016 Tour de France represented 35 different countries.

Country	No. of riders	Finishers	Stage wins
Argentina	2	2	
Australia	9	6	1 (Michael Matthews)
Austria	4	4	
Belarus	1	1	
Belgium	14	11	2 (Greg Van Avermaet ×1, Thomas De Gendt ×1)
Canada	1	1	
Colombia	4	4	1 (Jarlinson Pantano)
Croatia	2	2	
Czech Republic	3	3	
Denmark	7	5	
Eritrea	2	2	
Estonia	1	1	
Ethiopia	1	1	
France	38	34	1 (Romain Bardet)
Germany	12	11	2 (Marcel Kittel ×1, André Greipel ×1)
Great Britain	8	7	7 (Mark Cavendish ×4, Chris Froome ×2, Steve Cummings ×1)
Ireland	2	2	
Italy	13	13	
Japan	1	1	
Kazakhstan	1	1	
Lithuania	1	1	
Luxembourg	2	2	
Netherlands	15	13	2 (Tom Dumoulin)
New Zealand	3	2	
Norway	4	4	
Poland	3	3	
Portugal	2	2	
Russia	1	1	1 (Ilnur Zakarin)
Slovakia	1	1	3 (Peter Sagan)
Slovenia	4	3	
South Africa	3	3	
Spain	18	14	1 (Jon Izagirre)
Switzerland	9	7	
Ukraine	1	1	
United States	5	5	
Total	198	174	21
