= 2016 Tour Down Under =

2016 UCI World Tour, race 1 of 28

Race details
- Dates: 19–24 January 2016
- Stages: 6
- Distance: 781.3 km (485.5 mi)
- Winning time: 19h 11' 33"

Results
Jersey awarded to the overall winner	Winner	Simon Gerrans (AUS)	(Orica–GreenEDGE)
	Second	Richie Porte (AUS)	(BMC Racing Team)
	Third	Sergio Henao (COL)	(Team Sky)
Jersey awarded to the mountains classification winner	Mountains	Sergio Henao (COL)	(Team Sky)
Jersey awarded to the young rider classification winner	Young rider	Jay McCarthy (AUS)	(Tinkoff)
Jersey awarded to the sprints classification winner	Sprints	Simon Gerrans (AUS)	(Orica–GreenEDGE)
	Team	Cannondale	

The 2016 Tour Down Under was a road cycling stage race that took place between 19 and 24 January in and around Adelaide, South Australia. It was the 18th edition of the Tour Down Under and was the first event of the 2016 UCI World Tour. The defending champion was Rohan Dennis (BMC Racing Team).

Simon Gerrans (Orica–GreenEDGE) took the lead after the third stage of the race. He maintained his lead through the remaining three stages to win the race for the fourth time in his career. Australian cyclists won every stage of the 2016 Tour Down Under; this was the second time this had occurred in the race's history.

== Participating teams ==
As the Tour Down Under is a UCI World Tour event, all eighteen UCI World Teams were invited automatically and obliged to enter a team in the race. Two other teams were given wildcard entries into the race: these were Drapac Professional Cycling and UniSA–Australia.

UCI World Teams

- AG2R La Mondiale
- Astana
- BMC Racing Team
- Etixx–Quick-Step
- FDJ
- IAM Cycling
- Lampre–Merida
- Lotto–Soudal
- Movistar Team
- Team Giant–Alpecin
- Team Katusha
- LottoNL–Jumbo
- Team Dimension Data
- Team Sky
- Tinkoff
- Trek–Segafredo
- Orica–GreenEDGE
- Cannondale

Wildcard teams

- Drapac Professional Cycling
- UniSA–Australia

== Route ==
The route of the 2016 Tour Down Under was announced at the beginning of July 2015 and centred around the city of Adelaide in South Australia. There were six mass-start road stages and no time trials. The day before the start of the Tour, there was a flat criterium race, the People's Choice Classic, which took place in Rymill Park and which was suited for the sprinters. It was won by Caleb Ewan (Orica–GreenEDGE) in a sprint finish. The first five stages of the race itself included at least some climbing, with none of them particularly suited to the sprinters. The first two stages of the Tour both included climbs early in the stage and hilly circuits at the end. The third and fourth stages had climbs towards the end of each day's racing, with opportunities for attacks. The fifth stage finished with two climbs of Willunga Hill, which had been decisive in previous editions of the race. The final stage was another criterium around the centre of Adelaide.

Stage schedule
Stage	Date	Route	Distance	Type	Winner
1	19 January	Prospect to Lyndoch	130.8 km (81 mi)	Hilly stage	Caleb Ewan (AUS)
2	20 January	Unley to Stirling	132 km (82 mi)	Hilly stage	Jay McCarthy (AUS)
3	21 January	Glenelg to Campbelltown	139 km (86 mi)	Medium-mountain stage	Simon Gerrans (AUS)
4	22 January	Norwood to Victor Harbor	138 km (86 mi)	Hilly stage	Simon Gerrans (AUS)
5	23 January	McLaren Vale to Willunga Hill	151.5 km (94 mi)	Medium-mountain stage	Richie Porte (AUS)
6	24 January	Adelaide	90 km (56 mi)	Flat stage	Caleb Ewan (AUS)

== Pre-race favourites ==
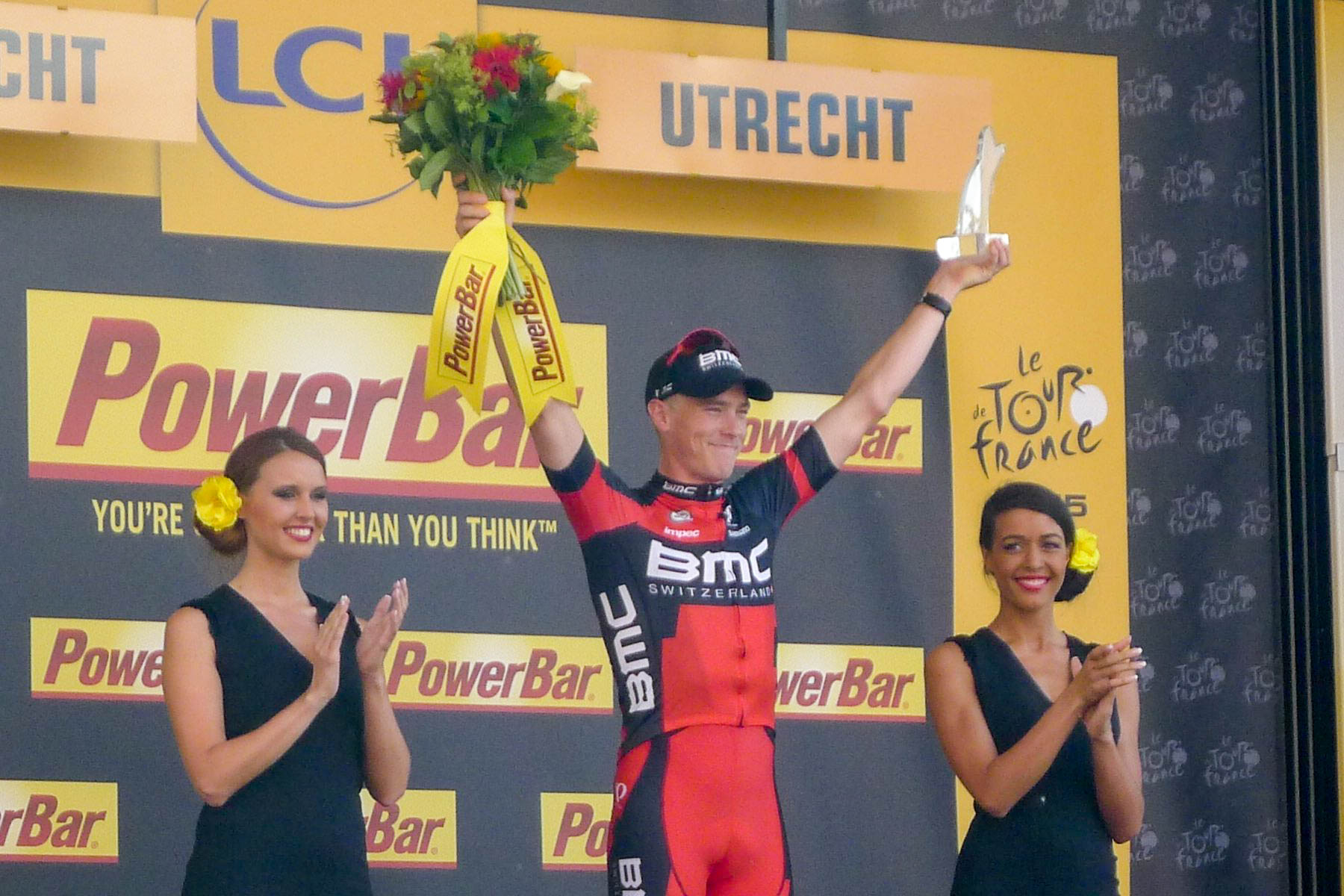
Rohan Dennis (BMC Racing Team), here shown after winning the first stage of the 2015 Tour de France, was the defending champion and one of the favourites for overall victory.

The Tour Down Under comes at the very beginning of the cycling season. Many riders begin their seasons at the race; they therefore are not at their peak form. Some riders also choose to start later in the season. In 2016, these included Chris Froome (Team Sky), Tom Boonen (Etixx–Quick-Step and Alberto Contador (Tinkoff). Others chose to begin their seasons at the Tour de San Luis, which takes place at the same time as the Tour Down Under in Argentina. These included Vincenzo Nibali (Astana), Nairo Quintana (Movistar Team) and Peter Sagan (Tinkoff). Despite the many prominent riders who did not appear at the race, the race director described himself as "delighted" with the field of riders who took to the startline.

The key stage was expected to be the penultimate stage, finishing on Old Willunga Hill. The third and fourth stages, which had climbs towards the finish of the race, were also expected to have the potential to affect the overall result. Three of the main favourites for the race were Australians. These were Rohan Dennis and Richie Porte (both BMC Racing Team) and Simon Gerrans (Orica–GreenEDGE). Dennis was the defending champion, having beaten Porte by two seconds in the 2015 race; Gerrans had won the race on three former occasions, in 2006, 2012 and 2014. While Porte and Dennis had an advantage on the uphill finishes, Gerrans's strong sprint gave him the opportunity to win bonus seconds. Other riders with a chance at a strong overall result included Geraint Thomas (Sky) and Louis Meintjes (Lampre–Merida).

The strongest sprinters in the race included Caleb Ewan (Orica–GreenEDGE), Wouter Wippert (Cannondale), Giacomo Nizzolo (Trek–Segafredo) and Matteo Pelucchi (IAM Cycling). They were expected to feature strongly on the first and last stages.

== Stages ==
=== Stage 1 ===
Result of Stage 1
Rank	Rider	Team	Time
1	Caleb Ewan (AUS)	Orica–GreenEDGE	3h 24' 13"
2	Mark Renshaw (AUS)	Team Dimension Data	+ 0"
3	Wouter Wippert (NED)	Cannondale	+ 0"
4	Marko Kump (SLO)	Lampre–Merida	+ 0"
5	Adam Blythe (GBR)	Tinkoff	+ 0"
6	Giacomo Nizzolo (ITA)	Trek–Segafredo	+ 0"
7	Ben Swift (GBR)	Team Sky	+ 0"
8	Steele Von Hoff (AUS)	UniSA–Australia	+ 0"
9	José Joaquín Rojas (ESP)	Movistar Team	+ 0"
10	Gregory Henderson (NZL)	Lotto–Soudal	+ 0"

General classification after Stage 1
Rank	Rider	Team	Time
1	Caleb Ewan (AUS)	Orica–GreenEDGE	3h 24' 03"
2	Mark Renshaw (AUS)	Team Dimension Data	+ 4"
3	Alexis Gougeard (FRA)	AG2R La Mondiale	+ 4"
4	Wouter Wippert (NED)	Cannondale	+ 6"
5	Sean Lake (AUS)	UniSA–Australia	+ 7"
6	Marko Kump (SLO)	Lampre–Merida	+ 10"
7	Adam Blythe (GBR)	Tinkoff	+ 10"
8	Giacomo Nizzolo (ITA)	Trek–Segafredo	+ 10"
9	Ben Swift (GBR)	Team Sky	+ 10"
10	Steele Von Hoff (AUS)	UniSA–Australia	+ 10"

=== Stage 2 ===
Result of Stage 2
Rank	Rider	Team	Time
1	Jay McCarthy (AUS)	Tinkoff	3h 26' 40"
2	Diego Ulissi (ITA)	Lampre–Merida	+ 0"
3	Rohan Dennis (AUS)	BMC Racing Team	+ 0"
4	Danilo Wyss (SUI)	BMC Racing Team	+ 0"
5	Petr Vakoč (CZE)	Etixx–Quick-Step	+ 0"
6	Patrick Bevin (NZL)	Cannondale	+ 0"
7	Juan José Lobato (ESP)	Movistar Team	+ 0"
8	Sergio Henao (COL)	Team Sky	+ 0"
9	Anthony Roux (FRA)	FDJ	+ 0"
10	Enrico Battaglin (ITA)	LottoNL–Jumbo	+ 0"

General classification after Stage 2
Rank	Rider	Team	Time
1	Jay McCarthy (AUS)	Tinkoff	6h 50' 43"
2	Diego Ulissi (ITA)	Lampre–Merida	+ 4"
3	Simon Gerrans (AUS)	Orica–GreenEDGE	+ 5"
4	Rohan Dennis (AUS)	BMC Racing Team	+ 6"
5	Reinardt Janse van Rensburg (RSA)	Team Dimension Data	+ 9"
6	Patrick Bevin (NZL)	Cannondale	+ 10"
7	Enrico Battaglin (ITA)	LottoNL–Jumbo	+ 10"
8	Juan José Lobato (ESP)	Movistar Team	+ 10"
9	Anthony Roux (FRA)	FDJ	+ 10"
10	Tobias Ludvigsson (SWE)	Team Giant–Alpecin	+ 10"

=== Stage 3 ===
Result of Stage 3
Rank	Rider	Team	Time
1	Simon Gerrans (AUS)	Orica–GreenEDGE	3h 37' 34"
2	Rohan Dennis (AUS)	BMC Racing Team	+ 0"
3	Michael Woods (CAN)	Cannondale	+ 0"
4	Jay McCarthy (AUS)	Tinkoff	+ 0"
5	Steve Morabito (SUI)	FDJ	+ 0"
6	Rafael Valls (ESP)	Lotto–Soudal	+ 0"
7	Sergio Henao (COL)	Team Sky	+ 0"
8	Domenico Pozzovivo (ITA)	AG2R La Mondiale	+ 0"
9	Richie Porte (AUS)	BMC Racing Team	+ 0"
10	Rubén Fernández (ESP)	Movistar Team	+ 0"

General classification after Stage 3
Rank	Rider	Team	Time
1	Simon Gerrans (AUS)	Orica–GreenEDGE	10h 28' 12"
2	Jay McCarthy (AUS)	Tinkoff	+ 3"
3	Rohan Dennis (AUS)	BMC Racing Team	+ 5"
4	Michael Woods (CAN)	Cannondale	+ 11"
5	Sergio Henao (COL)	Team Sky	+ 15"
6	Rafael Valls (ESP)	Lotto–Soudal	+ 15"
7	Rubén Fernández (ESP)	Movistar Team	+ 15"
8	Steve Morabito (SUI)	FDJ	+ 15"
9	Domenico Pozzovivo (ITA)	AG2R La Mondiale	+ 15"
10	Richie Porte (AUS)	BMC Racing Team	+ 15"

=== Stage 4 ===
Result of Stage 4
Rank	Rider	Team	Time
1	Simon Gerrans (AUS)	Orica–GreenEDGE	3h 13' 59"
2	Ben Swift (GBR)	Team Sky	+ 0"
3	Giacomo Nizzolo (ITA)	Trek–Segafredo	+ 0"
4	Jay McCarthy (AUS)	Tinkoff	+ 0"
5	Leigh Howard (AUS)	IAM Cycling	+ 0"
6	Reinardt Janse van Rensburg (RSA)	Team Dimension Data	+ 0"
7	Sergey Lagutin (RUS)	Team Katusha	+ 0"
8	Alexey Tsatevich (RUS)	Team Katusha	+ 0"
9	Nathan Haas (AUS)	Team Dimension Data	+ 0"
10	Enrico Battaglin (ITA)	LottoNL–Jumbo	+ 0"

General classification after Stage 4
Rank	Rider	Team	Time
1	Simon Gerrans (AUS)	Orica–GreenEDGE	13h 41' 58"
2	Jay McCarthy (AUS)	Tinkoff	+ 14"
3	Rohan Dennis (AUS)	BMC Racing Team	+ 26"
4	Sergio Henao (COL)	Team Sky	+ 28"
5	Steve Morabito (SUI)	FDJ	+ 28"
6	Rubén Fernández (ESP)	Movistar Team	+ 28"
7	Domenico Pozzovivo (ITA)	AG2R La Mondiale	+ 28"
8	Michael Woods (CAN)	Cannondale	+ 32"
9	Rafael Valls (ESP)	Lotto–Soudal	+ 36"
10	Richie Porte (AUS)	BMC Racing Team	+ 36"

=== Stage 5 ===
Result of Stage 5
Rank	Rider	Team	Time
1	Richie Porte (AUS)	BMC Racing Team	3h 34' 16"
2	Sergio Henao (COL)	Team Sky	+ 6"
3	Michael Woods (CAN)	Cannondale	+ 9"
4	Diego Ulissi (ITA)	Lampre–Merida	+ 17"
5	Rafael Valls (ESP)	Lotto–Soudal	+ 17"
6	Rubén Fernández (ESP)	Movistar Team	+ 17"
7	Domenico Pozzovivo (ITA)	AG2R La Mondiale	+ 17"
8	Simon Gerrans (AUS)	Orica–GreenEDGE	+ 17"
9	Jarlinson Pantano (COL)	IAM Cycling	+ 17"
10	Patrick Bevin (NZL)	Cannondale	+ 17"

General classification after Stage 5
Rank	Rider	Team	Time
1	Simon Gerrans (AUS)	Orica–GreenEDGE	17h 16' 31"
2	Richie Porte (AUS)	BMC Racing Team	+ 9"
3	Sergio Henao (COL)	Team Sky	+ 11"
4	Jay McCarthy (AUS)	Tinkoff	+ 20"
5	Michael Woods (CAN)	Cannondale	+ 20"
6	Rubén Fernández (ESP)	Movistar Team	+ 28"
7	Domenico Pozzovivo (ITA)	AG2R La Mondiale	+ 28"
8	Rafael Valls (ESP)	Lotto–Soudal	+ 36"
9	Steve Morabito (SUI)	FDJ	+ 49"
10	Patrick Bevin (NZL)	Cannondale	+ 50"

=== Stage 6 ===
Result of Stage 6
Rank	Rider	Team	Time
1	Caleb Ewan (AUS)	Orica–GreenEDGE	1h 55' 02"
2	Mark Renshaw (AUS)	Team Dimension Data	+ 0"
3	Giacomo Nizzolo (ITA)	Trek–Segafredo	+ 0"
4	Adam Blythe (GBR)	Tinkoff	+ 0"
5	Alexey Tsatevich (RUS)	Team Katusha	+ 0"
6	Ben Swift (GBR)	Team Sky	+ 0"
7	Marko Kump (SLO)	Lampre–Merida	+ 0"
8	Davide Martinelli (ITA)	Etixx–Quick-Step	+ 0"
9	Leigh Howard (AUS)	IAM Cycling	+ 0"
10	Wouter Wippert (NED)	Cannondale	+ 0"

Final general classification
Rank	Rider	Team	Time
1	Simon Gerrans (AUS)	Orica–GreenEDGE	19h 11' 33"
2	Richie Porte (AUS)	BMC Racing Team	+ 9"
3	Sergio Henao (COL)	Team Sky	+ 11"
4	Jay McCarthy (AUS)	Tinkoff	+ 20"
5	Michael Woods (CAN)	Cannondale	+ 20"
6	Rubén Fernández (ESP)	Movistar Team	+ 28"
7	Domenico Pozzovivo (ITA)	AG2R La Mondiale	+ 28"
8	Rafael Valls (ESP)	Lotto–Soudal	+ 36"
9	Steve Morabito (SUI)	FDJ	+ 49"
10	Patrick Bevin (NZL)	Cannondale	+ 50"

== Classification leadership table ==
Stage	Winner	General classification	Mountains classification	Sprint classification	Young rider classification	Most competitive rider	Team classification
1	Caleb Ewan	Caleb Ewan	Sean Lake	Caleb Ewan	Caleb Ewan	Alexis Gougeard	Cannondale
2	Jay McCarthy	Jay McCarthy	Manuele Boaro	Caleb Ewan	Jay McCarthy	Adam Hansen	Cannondale
3	Simon Gerrans	Simon Gerrans	Sergio Henao	Jay McCarthy	Jay McCarthy	Laurens De Vreese	Cannondale
4	Simon Gerrans	Simon Gerrans	Sergio Henao	Jay McCarthy	Jay McCarthy	David Tanner	Cannondale
5	Richie Porte	Simon Gerrans	Sergio Henao	Simon Gerrans	Jay McCarthy	Reinardt Janse van Rensburg	Cannondale
6	Caleb Ewan	Simon Gerrans	Sergio Henao	Simon Gerrans	Jay McCarthy	Maarten Tjallingii	Cannondale
Final		Simon Gerrans	Sergio Henao	Simon Gerrans	Jay McCarthy	-	Cannondale
