= Tom-Jelte Slagter =

Dutch road bicycle racer

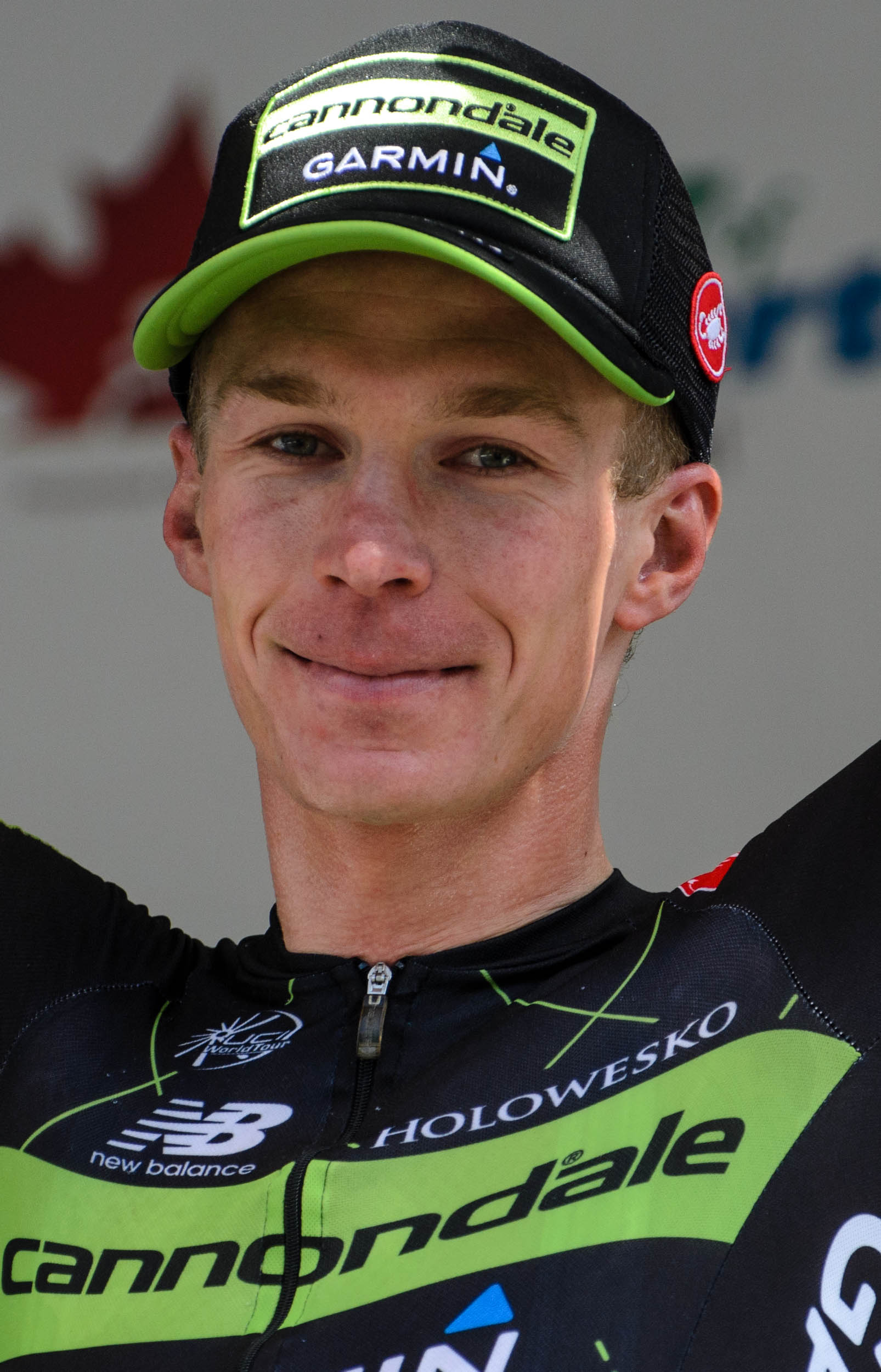
- Slagter at the 2015 Tour of Alberta

Personal information
- Full name: Tom-Jelte Slagter
- Nickname: TeJay
- Born: 1 July 1989 (age 37) Groningen, Netherlands
- Height: 1.67 m (5 ft 5 1/2 in)
- Weight: 57 kg (126 lb; 9 st 0 lb)

Cycling career
- Sport: Cycling
- Current team: Retired
- Discipline: Road
- Role: Rider
- Rider type: Puncheur; Climber

Amateur team
- 2010: Rabobank Continental Team

Professional teams
- 2011–2013: Rabobank
- 2014–2017: Garmin–Sharp
- 2018–2019: Team Dimension Data
- 2020: B&B Hotels–Vital Concept

Major wins
- Stage races Tour Down Under (2013)

Tom-Jelte Slagter (born 1 July 1989) is a Dutch former professional road racing cyclist, who rode professionally between 2011 and 2020, for the Belkin Pro Cycling, Cannondale–Drapac, Team Dimension Data and B&B Hotels–Vital Concept teams.

== Career ==
Born in Groningen, Groningen, Netherlands, Slagter currently resides in Leeuwarden, Friesland, Netherlands.

=== Rabobank (2011–2013) ===
While riding for Blanco Pro Cycling in 2013, Slagter won the Tour Down Under, his greatest career achievement. Slagter won the third stage after attacking on the finial climb, cresting it alone. He was joined by three riders on the descent, and with the peloton on their heels, Slagter out-sprinted the group. On the fifth stage, he gained the orange jersey; finishing atop Old Willunga Hill in second position, behind Australian Simon Gerrans (Orica–GreenEDGE), the defending champion. On the final stage, Slagter successfully defended his lead, with Spaniard Javier Moreno (Movistar Team) earning second place, seventeen seconds in arrears.

In August 2013, Slagter signed with the Garmin–Sharp squad, penning a two-year deal.

=== Garmin–Sharp (2014–2017) ===
==== 2014 ====
At Paris–Nice, Slagter won stages 4 and 7. He then went on to finish 2nd in the Spanish one-day race GP Miguel Induráin. His last race before his classics campaign was the Tour of the Basque Country in which he finished 13th. At Liége–Bastogne–Liége he finished 6th, his best result ever in a monument. Before that he also finished 5th in La Flèche Wallonne. Slagter rode the Tour de France, and finished 9th on stage 16 to Bagneres-de-Luchon. After the Tour, he rode the Clásica de San Sebastián. and finished just outside of top 10, in 14th place. He rode the Canadian World Tour classics, Grand Prix Cycliste de Québec, and Grand Prix Cycliste de Montréal, where he finished 11th and 12th respectively.

==== 2015 ====
Slagter's best result during the first part of the 2015 season, was finishing 9th in La Flèche Wallonne. He rode the Tour of Alberta, and won 2 stages during the race. He then rode the Canadian World Tour classics and finished 4th in Québec and 10th in Montréal.

=== Team Dimension Data (2018–2019) ===
In August 2017, Slagter signed a contract with Team Dimension Data. At the Tour Down Under, Slagter finished 3rd overall, in his first race for the team. His best result during the classics period was 12th at La Flèche Wallonne.

=== B&B Hotels–Vital Concept (2020) ===
After one season with B&B Hotels–Vital Concept, Slagter announced his retirement in November 2020; he intended to become a tractor salesman.

== Major results ==
2010
1st Road race, National Under-23 Road Championships
1st Stage 2 Circuit des Ardennes
4th Overall Tour de l'Avenir
7th Liège–Bastogne–Liège Espoirs
8th De Vlaamse Pijl
2012
5th Grand Prix Cycliste de Québec
6th Overall Tour of Oman
2013 (2 pro wins)
1st Overall Tour Down Under

1st Young rider classification
1st Stage 3

1st Mountains classification, Tour of Alberta
7th Grand Prix Cycliste de Québec
9th Overall Tour de l'Ain
2014 (2)
Paris–Nice

1st Stages 4 & 7

2nd GP Miguel Induráin
5th La Flèche Wallonne
6th Liège–Bastogne–Liège
2015 (2)
3rd Overall Tour of Alberta

1st Stages 3 & 4

4th Grand Prix Cycliste de Québec
9th La Flèche Wallonne
9th GP Miguel Induráin
10th Grand Prix Cycliste de Montréal
2016 (1)
1st Stage 1 Tour du Haut Var
4th Tre Valli Varesine
8th Clásica de San Sebastián
9th Brabantse Pijl
2017 (1)
1st Stage 2 Tour of Austria
3rd Grand Prix Cycliste de Montréal
4th Overall Tour of Alberta
6th Grand Prix Cycliste de Québec
2018
3rd Overall Tour Down Under
2019
6th Grand Prix Cycliste de Québec
7th Overall Tour de Yorkshire
8th Overall Deutschland Tour

=== Grand Tour general classification results timeline ===
Grand Tour	2011	2012	2013	2014	2015	2016	2017	2018
Giro d'Italia	DNF	30	—	—	76	—	77	—
Tour de France	—	—	—	56	—	82	—	59
Vuelta a España	75	—	—	—	—	—	—	—

=== Classics results timeline ===
Monument	2011	2012	2013	2014	2015	2016	2017	2018	2019
Milan–San Remo	—	—	DNF	105	—	14	—	—	51
Tour of Flanders	Did not contest during career								
Paris–Roubaix	Did not contest during career								
Liège–Bastogne–Liège	—	—	34	6	44	DNF	45	30	43
Giro di Lombardia	52	DNF	46	93	13	DNF	DNF	—	DNF
Classic	2011	2012	2013	2014	2015	2016	2017	2018	2019
Amstel Gold Race	—	—	85	21	36	60	46	76	85
La Flèche Wallonne	40	47	14	5	9	36	21	12	48
Clásica de San Sebastián	—	—	49	14	27	8	—	DNF	—
Grand Prix Cycliste de Québec	—	5	7	11	4	15	6	97	6
Grand Prix Cycliste de Montréal	—	20	15	12	10	17	3	84	50

Legend
—	Did not compete
DSQ	Disqualified
DNF	Did not finish
