= Simon Gerrans =

Australian road bicycle racer

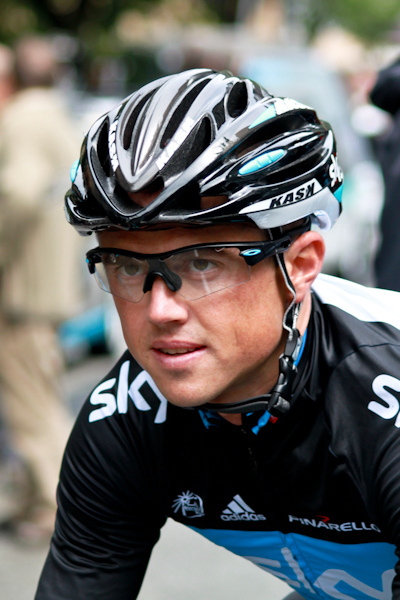
- Gerrans at the 2011 Critérium du Dauphiné

Personal information
- Full name: Simon Gerrans
- Born: 16 May 1980 (age 46) Melbourne, Australia
- Height: 1.70 m (5 ft 7 in)
- Weight: 64 kg (141 lb; 10 st 1 lb)

Cycling career
- Sport: Cycling
- Current team: Retired
- Discipline: Road
- Role: Rider
- Rider type: Puncheur

Amateur teams
- 2003: Team Ringerike SK
- 2003: Carvalhelhos–Boavista (stagiaire)
- 2004: AG2R Prévoyance (stagiaire)

Professional teams
- 2005–2007: AG2R Prévoyance
- 2008: Crédit Agricole
- 2009: Cervélo TestTeam
- 2010–2011: Team Sky
- 2012–2017: GreenEDGE
- 2018: BMC Racing Team

Major wins
- Grand Tours Tour de France 2 individual stages (2008, 2013) 2 TTT stages (2013, 2018) Giro d'Italia 1 individual stage (2009) 1 TTT stage (2015) Vuelta a España 1 individual stage (2009) Stage races Herald Sun Tour (2005, 2006) Danmark Rundt (2011) Tour Down Under (2006, 2012, 2014, 2016) One-day races and Classics National Road Race Championships (2012, 2014) Milan–San Remo (2012) Liège–Bastogne–Liège (2014) GP Ouest–France (2009) GP de Québec (2012, 2014) GP de Montréal (2014)
Medal record
World Championships
Representing Australia
| Silver medal – second place | 2014 Ponferrada | Road race |

Simon Gerrans (born 16 May 1980) is an Australian former professional road bicycle racer, who rode professionally between 2005 and 2018, for the AG2R Prévoyance, Crédit Agricole, Cervélo TestTeam, Team Sky, Orica–Scott and BMC Racing Team squads. Post-retirement he initially worked as an athlete intern at Goldman Sachs in London, then joined The Service Course, in which he is an investor, as COO and now CEO, in early 2020. He can also be heard commentating road cycling for ASO and SBS.

Gerrans was a two-time winner of the Australian National Road Race Championships, having won the title in 2012, and 2014. Aside from his National Championship successes, his biggest triumphs were winning the Tour Down Under a record four times, and getting the better of one-day races such as the 2009 GP Ouest-France, the 2012 Milan–San Remo, the 2012 and 2014 Grand Prix Cycliste de Québec, the 2014 Liège–Bastogne–Liège, and stage wins in all three Grand Tours. In the 2013 Tour de France, Gerrans claimed the yellow jersey on Stage 4 after being part of the winning team in the Stage 4 team time trial in Nice.

== Early life ==
Gerrans was born in Melbourne, Victoria and grew up in Mansfield, Victoria.

== Career ==
Gerrans took up cycling after injuring his knee and speaking with his neighbour, former Yellow Jersey holder Phil Anderson whom he credits with introducing him to the sport. Gerrans was an Australian Institute of Sport scholarship holder.

In 2002, he finished fifth in the senior Australian National Road Race Championships, and took the under 23 title. He went on to ride as a trainee with the Carvalhelhos–Boavista team, based in Portugal from 1 September 2003, and then as a trainee for the AG2R Prévoyance team from 1 September 2004. He turned professional in 2005, staying with AG2R Prévoyance, and participated in his first Tour de France in the same year.

Gerrans underwent surgery at a hospital in Nice following a heavy fall in the GP d'Ouverture la Marseillaise in February, 2006. A pin was inserted into his shattered left collarbone and a screw put into his broken right shoulder, and had stitches in his head. He resumed training three weeks later and went on to represent Australia at the 2006 Commonwealth Games in Melbourne.

In 2008, Gerrans rode for the Crédit Agricole team. He won stage 15 of the Tour de France, the high point of his career so far, after being in the four-man breakaway for most of the day. Barely surviving attacks from the other strong climbers in the breakaway, in which the fourth rider was dropped from the group, he eventually sprinted away in the last few dozen metres, without a response from the two remaining contenders.

Following the closure of the Crédit Agricole team Gerrans signed with the UCI Professional Continental Cervélo TestTeam for the 2009 season. Despite his success of the previous year, he was not included in the squad for the 2009 Tour de France.

On stage 14 of the 2009 Giro d'Italia Gerrans attacked his breakaway companions on the short steep climb of San Luca, near Bologna, to win the stage – the first Grand Tour stage victory for Cervélo TestTeam. After winning 10th stage of the 2009 Vuelta a España Gerrans became the first Australian to win a stage of each of the three Grand Tours.

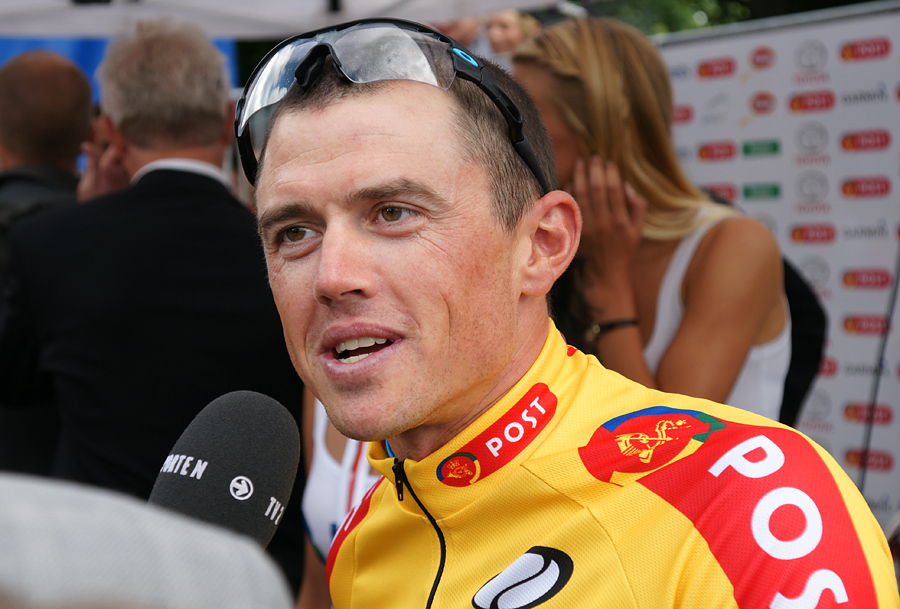
Simon Gerrans (Team Sky) after winning the 2011 Danmark Rundt

He signed with Team Sky for season 2010 and made the Team Sky selection for the 2010 Tour de France. Gerrans was involved in a large crash on Stage 8 of the race resulting in a broken arm and his withdrawal from the race.

In 2011, Gerrans came 3rd in the Amstel Gold Race. In August, he won the Danmark Rundt. Shortly after that victory, it was announced that Gerrans would join GreenEDGE for the team's inaugural season in 2012.

=== 2012 season ===
In January 2012, Gerrans became national road race champion for the first time, out-sprinting Lampre–ISD's Matthew Lloyd and Team Sky's Richie Porte for victory. Later in the month he won the Tour Down Under for the second time. He secured the victory on stage 5, where his second-place finish allowed him to take the ochre jersey ahead of Valverde, who won the stage. Both riders were on the same time, but due to better cumulative stage finishes, Gerrans took the lead and did not relinquish it. On 17 March 2012, Gerrans won Milan–San Remo in a three-man sprint finish, beating RadioShack–Nissan's Fabian Cancellara and Liquigas–Cannondale's Vincenzo Nibali to the line in Sanremo. Later in the season, Gerrans took second place at the Clásica de San Sebastián, dominating the chase group sprint as the lone escapee Luis León Sánchez (Rabobank) crossed the line seven seconds before him. In September, Gerrans took his third victory in a 2012 UCI World Tour race by being victorious in the Grand Prix Cycliste de Québec. He countered an attack by BMC Racing Team's Greg Van Avermaet with 3.5 kilometres (2.2 mi) to race. The pair went up the final difficulties of the day and broke clear of the bunch. Gerrans then out sprinted the Belgian to the finish line while the chasers were closing in at four seconds.

=== 2013 season ===
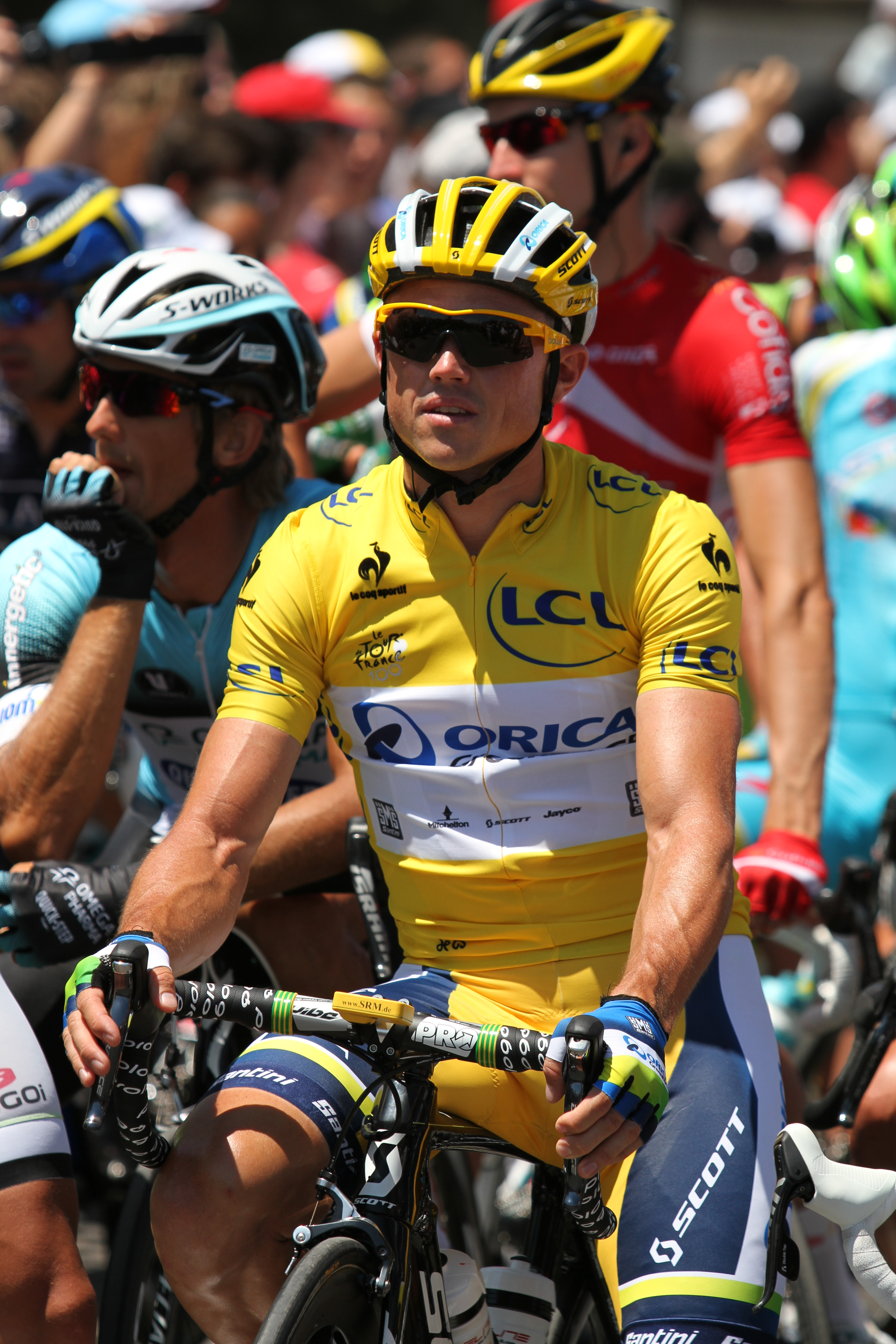
Gerrans in the Yellow Jersey at the 2013 Tour de France

In 2013, with the help of his team Orica–GreenEDGE, he enjoyed much success on the bike. He began the season with a decent Tour Down Under, winning the penultimate stage; after getting in a breakaway with Javier Moreno of Spain and Tom-Jelte Slagter of the Netherlands, Gerrans out-sprinted Slagter for the stage win. However most of his real successes came from Europe. Gerrans enjoyed a third-place finish in the Amstel Gold Race. His participation in the Volta a Catalunya yielded more success, winning the sixth stage in a sprint finish; he did so by a bike length ahead of Gianni Meersman of Belgium. Gerrans began the Tour of the Basque Country well taking out the first stage honours. After a lead-out from teammate Pieter Weening, Gerrans sprinted to his third stage victory of the year ahead of a fast-finishing Peter Velits of Omega Pharma–Quick-Step. He also finished tenth at Liège–Bastogne–Liège. At the Tour de France, Gerrans and his team enjoyed a very successful start to the tour. After avoiding much of the carnage of the first two stages of the tour, Gerrans ended up taking the stage honours for the third stage after a sprint to the line finish where he narrowly edged out Slovak Peter Sagan. The stage win was the first for Orica–GreenEDGE at the Tour. Orica–GreenEDGE also won the team time trial the following day, beating Omega Pharma–Quick-Step; as a result, Gerrans donned the race leader's yellow jersey, only the sixth Australian cyclist to do so. He earned plaudits during stage 6 by holding back at the stage finish, allowing his teammate Daryl Impey to take the yellow jersey from him and become its first South African wearer.

=== 2014 season ===
After winning the Australian National road race, Gerrans went on to win the Tour Down Under for the third time in his career, besting his fellow countryman Cadel Evans by a single second. He also prevailed on the first stage in the process and gained the leader's jersey thanks to time bonuses at intermediate sprints and stage finishes. On 27 April 2014 Gerrans won the cycling monument Liège–Bastogne–Liège in the sprint, becoming the first Australian to win the race. On Stage 1 of the 2014 Tour de France, Mark Cavendish collided with Gerrans in the final 500 metres, with both crashing heavily to the ground. The crash happened as the front of the peloton overtook lone escapee Fabian Cancellara. Having failed to get the inside line on the left-hand curve, with his Omega-Pharma team out of the picture, Cavendish was pushing with his head and shoulders in a desperate attempt to move Australia's Simon Gerrans to the left. Cavendish wanted to get a clear run to the line, but Gerrans did not yield because the Frenchman Bryan Coquard was to his left. Cavendish lost control of his front wheel and fell heavily on his right shoulder, with Gerrans, a stage winner and yellow jersey wearer last year, hitting the deck simultaneously. Gerrans went back to his winning ways in Quebec City, coming back from a mechanical with 20 km left to win the Grand Prix Cycliste de Québec after surging past Tom Dumoulin on the slightly uphill finish. He is the first cyclist to take two victories in the Canadian World Tour event. Two days later, Gerrans realised another first: he became the first rider to win the Grand Prix Cycliste de Québec and Montreal back-to-back in the same year as he won the sprint in the Grand Prix Cycliste de Montréal. Those two wins announced very good form just ahead of the World Championships in Ponferrada, in which he came in second place after his select group failed to reach lone escapee Michał Kwiatkowski.

=== 2015 season ===
Gerrans had an unlucky start to the season, as he broke his collarbone in January while he was training for the Tour Down Under. His first race back was the Strade Bianche, but he fractured his elbow in another crash during the Italian event. He was looking for a result as he came back to racing, but his bad luck continued as he crashed twice in Liège–Bastogne–Liège and abandoned. However, he did not sustain any serious injuries in the latter crashes. He participated to the Giro d'Italia and crashed again on the rainy twelfth stage, forcing him to abandon. In the Tour de France, Gerrans was involved in a massive, high-speed crash on stage 3 and he had to quit the race due to a broken wrist.

=== 2016 season ===
Gerrans started the year well by winning two stages of an Australian World Tour race, the Tour Down Under. Thanks to the bonus seconds on offer for placing highly in the individual stages, he won the general classification for the fourth time in his career. This sent Gerrans to the top of the new UCI World Ranking, which was starting fresh from January 2016, a position he held for 7 weeks. He broke his collarbone on Stage 12 of the Tour de France.

=== 2017 season ===
Gerrans endured a winless 2017, and was not selected for any of the Grand Tours. In September 2017 it was announced that he would join the BMC Racing Team for 2018, with a role as a road captain and key domestique for Richie Porte and Greg Van Avermaet. Gerrans subsequently revealed that he had been considering retirement before being personally approached by Porte after the Tour de France to join BMC.

=== 2018 season ===
Gerrans was selected for the 2018 Tour de France, his 12th participation in the race. In August 2018, he announced in an open letter published by the BMC Racing Team that he would retire from competition at the end of the season, stating that his "passion for the sport is not what it used to be", but indicating that he wanted to remain involved in cycling in some capacity after spending more time with his family.

== Major results ==
2002
1st Road race, National Under-23 Road Championships
1st Overall Tour of Tasmania

1st Stage 3

7th Overall Grand Prix Guillaume Tell

1st Stage 2

2003
1st Melbourne to Warrnambool Classic
1st Stage 3 Tour of Tasmania
4th Overall Herald Sun Tour
2004 (1 pro win)
2nd Overall Ringerike GP
2nd Overall Paris–Corrèze
3rd Overall Ruban Granitier Breton
4th Archer Grand Prix
7th Overall Boucles de la Mayenne
8th Overall Herald Sun Tour

1st Stage 9

2005 (4)
1st Overall Herald Sun Tour

1st Stage 3

1st Gran Premio Industria e Commercio Artigianato Carnaghese
1st Tour du Finistère
4th Overall Circuit des Ardennes
6th Gran Premio Industria e Commercio di Prato
7th Overall Tour Down Under
8th Brabantse Pijl
2006 (3)
1st Overall Tour Down Under

1st Stage 1

1st Overall Herald Sun Tour
6th GP Triberg-Schwarzwald
2007 (1)
1st Grand Prix de Plumelec-Morbihan
2nd Overall Bay Classic Series

1st Sprints classification
1st Stage 5

2nd Tour du Haut Var
5th Grand Prix de Fourmies
9th Boucles de l'Aulne
2008 (3)
1st Stage 15 Tour de France
1st Stage 2 Critérium International
4th Overall Route du Sud

1st Stage 1

5th Road race, National Road Championships
2009 (3)
1st GP Ouest–France
1st Stage 14 Giro d'Italia
1st Stage 10 Vuelta a España
1st Stage 1 Bay Classic Series
3rd Gran Premio di Lugano
6th Liège–Bastogne–Liège
7th Amstel Gold Race
8th Overall Volta ao Algarve
8th La Flèche Wallonne
10th Road race, UCI Road World Championships
2011 (1)
1st Overall Danmark Rundt
2nd GP Ouest–France
3rd Road race, National Road Championships
3rd Amstel Gold Race
5th Coppa Sabatini
10th Overall Volta ao Algarve
10th Clásica de San Sebastián
2012 (4)
1st Road race, National Road Championships
1st Overall Tour Down Under
1st Milan–San Remo
1st Grand Prix Cycliste de Québec
2nd Clásica de San Sebastián
4th Grand Prix Cycliste de Montréal
6th UCI World Tour
2013 (4)
Tour de France

1st Stages 3 & 4 (TTT)
Held after Stages 4–5

1st Stage 5 Tour Down Under
1st Stage 6 Volta a Catalunya
1st Stage 1 Tour of the Basque Country
3rd Amstel Gold Race
10th Liège–Bastogne–Liège
2014 (6)
1st Road race, National Road Championships
1st Overall Tour Down Under

1st Sprints classification
1st Stage 1

1st Liège–Bastogne–Liège
1st Grand Prix Cycliste de Québec
1st Grand Prix Cycliste de Montréal
2nd Road race, UCI Road World Championships
3rd UCI World Tour
3rd Amstel Gold Race
3rd Vattenfall Cyclassics
7th Overall Herald Sun Tour
2015
Giro d'Italia

1st Stage 1 (TTT)
Held after Stage 1

6th Road race, UCI Road World Championships
2016 (3)
1st Overall Tour Down Under

1st Sprints classification
1st Stages 3 & 4

5th Cadel Evans Great Ocean Road Race
Combativity award Stage 14 Vuelta a España
2017
2nd Road race, National Road Championships
2nd Overall Tour of Norway
2nd Cadel Evans Great Ocean Road Race
2018
1st Stage 3 (TTT) Tour de France
1st Stage 1 (TTT) Tour de Suisse
5th Cadel Evans Great Ocean Road Race

=== Grand Tour general classification results timeline ===
| Grand Tour | 2005 | 2006 | 2007 | 2008 | 2009 | 2010 | 2011 | 2012 | 2013 | 2014 | 2015 | 2016 | 2017 | 2018 |
|---|---|---|---|---|---|---|---|---|---|---|---|---|---|---|
| Giro d'Italia | — | — | — | — | 43 | — | — | — | — | — | DNF | — | — | — |
| Tour de France | 126 | 77 | 94 | 77 | — | DNF | 96 | 79 | 80 | DNF | — | DNF | — | 107 |
| Vuelta a España | — | — | — | — | DNF | DNF | — | — | DNF | — | 114 | 86 | — | — |

=== Classics results timeline ===
| Monument | 2005 | 2006 | 2007 | 2008 | 2009 | 2010 | 2011 | 2012 | 2013 | 2014 | 2015 | 2016 | 2017 | 2018 |
|---|---|---|---|---|---|---|---|---|---|---|---|---|---|---|
| Milan–San Remo | — | — | — | 147 | — | — | — | 1 | 68 | — | — | — | 36 | — |
| Tour of Flanders | 92 | — | — | — | — | — | — | — | — | — | — | — | — | — |
| Paris–Roubaix | Did not contest during career | | | | | | | | | | | | | |
| Liège–Bastogne–Liège | DNF | — | DNF | 54 | 6 | 11 | 12 | 19 | 10 | 1 | DNF | 33 | 139 | 77 |
| Giro di Lombardia | — | — | — | — | DNF | — | — | DNF | — | — | DNF | — | — | DNF |
| Classic | 2005 | 2006 | 2007 | 2008 | 2009 | 2010 | 2011 | 2012 | 2013 | 2014 | 2015 | 2016 | 2017 | 2018 |
| Great Ocean Road Race | Race did not exist | | | | | | | | | | — | 5 | 2 | 5 |
| Brabantse Pijl | 8 | — | — | — | 53 | DNF | — | — | — | 46 | — | — | 52 | — |
| Amstel Gold Race | — | — | 37 | 12 | 7 | 63 | 3 | 20 | 3 | 3 | 70 | 11 | DNF | 79 |
| La Flèche Wallonne | 66 | — | 74 | — | 8 | 54 | 21 | — | — | — | — | — | — | 86 |
| Clásica de San Sebastián | — | 53 | 93 | — | — | — | 10 | 2 | 34 | — | — | — | 75 | DNF |
| Hamburg Cyclassics | — | DNF | 58 | DNF | — | — | — | — | — | 3 | — | — | 76 | 57 |
| GP Ouest–France | 52 | 18 | 62 | — | 1 | 101 | 2 | 12 | — | 51 | — | — | 95 | 47 |
| Grand Prix Cycliste de Québec | Race did not exist | | | | | — | 32 | 1 | — | 1 | — | — | 58 | 90 |
| Grand Prix Cycliste de Montréal | Race did not exist | | | | | — | 71 | 4 | — | 1 | — | — | 66 | 92 |

=== Major championships timeline ===
| Event | | 2000 | 2001 | 2002 | 2003 | 2004 | 2005 | 2006 | 2007 | 2008 | 2009 | 2010 | 2011 | 2012 | 2013 | 2014 | 2015 | 2016 | 2017 | 2018 |
|---|---|---|---|---|---|---|---|---|---|---|---|---|---|---|---|---|---|---|---|---|
| Olympic Games | Road race | — | Not held | | | — | Not held | | | 36 | Not held | | | 83 | Not held | | | — | Not held | |
| World Championships | Road race | — | — | — | — | DNF | 86 | 89 | 66 | DNF | 10 | DNF | 79 | 20 | — | 2 | 6 | — | — | — |
| National Championships | Road race | 6 | — | — | 19 | — | 8 | DNF | — | 5 | — | — | 3 | 1 | 9 | 1 | — | 6 | 2 | DNF |

Legend
| — | Did not compete |
| DNF | Did not finish |
| NH | Event not held |
