= 2014 Tour Down Under =

2014 UCI World Tour, race 1 of 28

Race details
- Dates: 21–26 January 2014
- Stages: 6
- Distance: 815.5 km (506.7 mi)
- Winning time: 19h 57' 35"

Results
Jersey awarded to the overall winner	Winner	Simon Gerrans (Australia)	(Orica–GreenEDGE)
	Second	Cadel Evans (Australia)	(BMC Racing Team)
	Third	Diego Ulissi (Italy)	(Lampre–Merida)
Jersey awarded to the mountains classification winner	Mountains	Adam Hansen (Australia)	(Lotto–Belisol)
Jersey awarded to the young rider classification winner	Young rider	Jack Haig (Australia)	(UniSA-Australia)
Jersey awarded to the sprints classification winner	Sprints	Simon Gerrans (Australia)	(Orica–GreenEDGE)
	Team	Orica–GreenEDGE	

The 2014 Santos Tour Down Under was the 16th edition of the Tour Down Under stage race. It took place from 21 to 26 January in and around Adelaide, South Australia, and was the first race of the 2014 UCI World Tour.

The race was won for a record third time by Australian national champion Simon Gerrans of the Orica–GreenEDGE team, after taking the lead on the penultimate stage of the race and held the race leader's ochre jersey to the finish, the next day, in Adelaide. Gerrans also won the opening stage of the race in Angaston. Gerrans' winning margin over runner-up Cadel Evans of the BMC Racing Team was one second, and Lampre–Merida's Diego Ulissi completed the podium, four seconds behind Evans and five seconds in arrears of Gerrans. Like Gerrans, Ulissi and Evans both won stages of the race, winning in Stirling and Campbelltown respectively, while Evans also held the race lead for two days. The other stages were won by Lotto–Belisol rider André Greipel (two wins) and Richie Porte, who won the queen stage at Willunga Hill.

The race's other classifications were swept by Australian riders, as Gerrans' consistent finishes – five top-five stage finishes from six stages – across the week ensured that he won the blue jersey for the sprints classification, while Lotto–Belisol rider Adam Hansen was the winner of the mountains classification. UniSA-Australia's Jack Haig was the winner of the young rider classification, finishing seventeenth overall, while the teams classification was won by Gerrans' Orica–GreenEDGE outfit, also placing Daryl Impey inside the top ten overall.

== Schedule ==
List of stages
Stage	Date	Course	Distance	Type	Winner
1	21 January	Nuriootpa to Angaston	135 km (84 mi)	Flat stage	Simon Gerrans (AUS)
2	22 January	Prospect to Stirling	150 km (93 mi)	Medium-mountain stage	Diego Ulissi (ITA)
3	23 January	Norwood to Campbelltown	145 km (90 mi)	Hilly stage	Cadel Evans (AUS)
4	24 January	Unley to Victor Harbor	148.5 km (92 mi)	Flat stage	André Greipel (GER)
5	25 January	McLaren Vale to Willunga Hill	151.5 km (94 mi)	Medium-mountain stage	Richie Porte (AUS)
6	26 January	Adelaide	85.5 km (53 mi)	Flat stage	André Greipel (GER)

== Participating teams ==
As the Tour Down Under is a UCI World Tour event, all 18 UCI ProTeams were invited automatically and obligated to send a squad. Australian team Drapac Professional Cycling received a wildcard invitation and together with a selection of Australian riders forming the UniSA-Australia squad, this formed the event's 20-team peloton.

The 20 teams invited to the race were:

- Ag2r–La Mondiale
- Astana
- Belkin Pro Cycling
- BMC Racing Team
- Cannondale
- Drapac Professional Cycling
- Team Europcar
- FDJ.fr
- Garmin–Sharp
- Giant–Shimano
- Team Katusha
- Lampre–Merida
- Lotto–Belisol
- Movistar Team
- Omega Pharma–Quick-Step
- Orica–GreenEDGE
- Team Sky
- Tinkoff–Saxo
- Trek Factory Racing
- UniSA-Australia

== Stages ==
=== Stage 1 ===
21 January 2014 — Nuriootpa to Angaston, 135 km (83.9 mi)

Stage 1 Result

	Rider	Team	Time
1	Simon Gerrans (AUS)	Orica–GreenEDGE	3h 20' 34"
2	André Greipel (GER)	Lotto–Belisol	s.t.
3	Steele Von Hoff (AUS)	Garmin–Sharp	s.t.
4	Diego Ulissi (ITA)	Lampre–Merida	s.t.
5	Maxime Bouet (FRA)	Ag2r–La Mondiale	s.t.
6	Francesco Gavazzi (ITA)	Astana	s.t.
7	Simon Geschke (GER)	Giant–Shimano	s.t.
8	Rafael Valls (ESP)	Lampre–Merida	s.t.
9	Cadel Evans (AUS)	BMC Racing Team	s.t.
10	Robert Gesink (NED)	Belkin Pro Cycling	s.t.

General Classification after Stage 1

	Rider	Team	Time
1	Simon Gerrans (AUS)	Orica–GreenEDGE	3h 20' 23"
2	André Greipel (GER)	Lotto–Belisol	+ 5"
3	Steele Von Hoff (AUS)	Garmin–Sharp	+ 7"
4	Simon Geschke (GER)	Giant–Shimano	+ 10"
5	Diego Ulissi (ITA)	Lampre–Merida	+ 11"
6	Maxime Bouet (FRA)	Ag2r–La Mondiale	+ 11"
7	Francesco Gavazzi (ITA)	Astana	+ 11"
8	Rafael Valls (ESP)	Lampre–Merida	+ 11"
9	Cadel Evans (AUS)	BMC Racing Team	+ 11"
10	Robert Gesink (NED)	Belkin Pro Cycling	+ 11"

=== Stage 2 ===
22 January 2014 — Prospect to Stirling, 150 km (93.2 mi)

Stage 2 Result

	Rider	Team	Time
1	Diego Ulissi (ITA)	Lampre–Merida	3h 52' 14"
2	Simon Gerrans (AUS)	Orica–GreenEDGE	s.t.
3	Cadel Evans (AUS)	BMC Racing Team	s.t.
4	Francesco Gavazzi (ITA)	Astana	s.t.
5	Robert Gesink (NED)	Belkin Pro Cycling	s.t.
6	Richie Porte (AUS)	Team Sky	s.t.
7	Ben Hermans (BEL)	BMC Racing Team	s.t.
8	Fabio Felline (ITA)	Trek Factory Racing	s.t.
9	Javier Moreno (ESP)	Movistar Team	s.t.
10	Daryl Impey (RSA)	Orica–GreenEDGE	s.t.

General Classification after Stage 2

	Rider	Team	Time
1	Simon Gerrans (AUS)	Orica–GreenEDGE	7h 12' 31"
2	Diego Ulissi (ITA)	Lampre–Merida	+ 7"
3	André Greipel (GER)	Lotto–Belisol	+ 11"
4	Cadel Evans (AUS)	BMC Racing Team	+ 13"
5	Steele Von Hoff (AUS)	Garmin–Sharp	+ 13"
6	Simon Geschke (GER)	Giant–Shimano	+ 16"
7	Francesco Gavazzi (ITA)	Astana	+ 17"
8	Robert Gesink (NED)	Belkin Pro Cycling	+ 17"
9	Maxime Bouet (FRA)	Ag2r–La Mondiale	+ 17"
10	Geraint Thomas (GBR)	Team Sky	+ 17"

=== Stage 3 ===
23 January 2014 — Norwood to Campbelltown, 145 km (90.1 mi)

Stage 3 Result

	Rider	Team	Time
1	Cadel Evans (AUS)	BMC Racing Team	3h 34' 05"
2	Nathan Haas (AUS)	Garmin–Sharp	+ 15"
3	Diego Ulissi (ITA)	Lampre–Merida	+ 15"
4	Adam Hansen (AUS)	Lotto–Belisol	+ 15"
5	Simon Gerrans (AUS)	Orica–GreenEDGE	+ 15"
6	Rory Sutherland (AUS)	Tinkoff–Saxo	+ 15"
7	Brent Bookwalter (USA)	BMC Racing Team	+ 15"
8	Ben Hermans (BEL)	BMC Racing Team	+ 15"
9	Daryl Impey (RSA)	Orica–GreenEDGE	+ 15"
10	Robert Gesink (NED)	Belkin Pro Cycling	+ 15"

General Classification after Stage 3

	Rider	Team	Time
1	Cadel Evans (AUS)	BMC Racing Team	10h 46' 39"
2	Simon Gerrans (AUS)	Orica–GreenEDGE	+ 12"
3	Diego Ulissi (ITA)	Lampre–Merida	+ 15"
4	Nathan Haas (AUS)	Garmin–Sharp	+ 27"
5	Robert Gesink (NED)	Belkin Pro Cycling	+ 29"
6	Geraint Thomas (GBR)	Team Sky	+ 29"
7	Daryl Impey (RSA)	Orica–GreenEDGE	+ 33"
8	Brent Bookwalter (USA)	BMC Racing Team	+ 33"
9	Rory Sutherland (AUS)	Tinkoff–Saxo	+ 33"
10	Ben Hermans (BEL)	BMC Racing Team	+ 33"

=== Stage 4 ===
24 January 2014 — Unley to Victor Harbor, 148.5 km (92.3 mi)

Stage 4 Result

	Rider	Team	Time
1	André Greipel (GER)	Lotto–Belisol	3h 33' 07"
2	Jürgen Roelandts (BEL)	Lotto–Belisol	s.t.
3	Elia Viviani (ITA)	Cannondale	s.t.
4	Simon Gerrans (AUS)	Orica–GreenEDGE	s.t.
5	Nathan Haas (AUS)	Garmin–Sharp	s.t.
6	Daryl Impey (RSA)	Orica–GreenEDGE	s.t.
7	Maxime Bouet (FRA)	Ag2r–La Mondiale	s.t.
8	Nikolay Trusov (RUS)	Tinkoff–Saxo	s.t.
9	Anthony Roux (FRA)	FDJ.fr	s.t.
10	Francesco Gavazzi (ITA)	Astana	s.t.

General Classification after Stage 4

	Rider	Team	Time
1	Cadel Evans (AUS)	BMC Racing Team	14h 19' 46"
2	Simon Gerrans (AUS)	Orica–GreenEDGE	+ 7"
3	Diego Ulissi (ITA)	Lampre–Merida	+ 14"
4	Nathan Haas (AUS)	Garmin–Sharp	+ 23"
5	Robert Gesink (NED)	Belkin Pro Cycling	+ 29"
6	Geraint Thomas (GBR)	Team Sky	+ 29"
7	Daryl Impey (RSA)	Orica–GreenEDGE	+ 33"
8	Brent Bookwalter (USA)	BMC Racing Team	+ 33"
9	Rory Sutherland (AUS)	Tinkoff–Saxo	+ 33"
10	Richie Porte (AUS)	Team Sky	+ 33"

=== Stage 5 ===
25 January 2014 — McLaren Vale to Willunga Hill, 151.5 km (94.1 mi)

Stage 5 Result

	Rider	Team	Time
1	Richie Porte (AUS)	Team Sky	3h 42' 20"
2	Diego Ulissi (ITA)	Lampre–Merida	+ 10"
3	Simon Gerrans (AUS)	Orica–GreenEDGE	+ 10"
4	Robert Gesink (NED)	Belkin Pro Cycling	+ 14"
5	Daryl Impey (RSA)	Orica–GreenEDGE	+ 14"
6	Cadel Evans (AUS)	BMC Racing Team	+ 14"
7	Nathan Haas (AUS)	Garmin–Sharp	+ 17"
8	Egor Silin (RUS)	Team Katusha	+ 17"
9	Adam Hansen (AUS)	Lotto–Belisol	+ 17"
10	Geraint Thomas (GBR)	Team Sky	+ 21"

General Classification after Stage 5

	Rider	Team	Time
1	Simon Gerrans (AUS)	Orica–GreenEDGE	18h 02' 19"
2	Cadel Evans (AUS)	BMC Racing Team	+ 1"
3	Diego Ulissi (ITA)	Lampre–Merida	+ 5"
4	Richie Porte (AUS)	Team Sky	+ 10"
5	Nathan Haas (AUS)	Garmin–Sharp	+ 27"
6	Robert Gesink (NED)	Belkin Pro Cycling	+ 30"
7	Daryl Impey (RSA)	Orica–GreenEDGE	+ 34"
8	Adam Hansen (AUS)	Lotto–Belisol	+ 37"
9	Geraint Thomas (GBR)	Team Sky	+ 37"
10	Egor Silin (RUS)	Team Katusha	+ 37"

=== Stage 6 ===
26 January 2014 — Adelaide (criterium), 85.5 km (53.1 mi)

Stage 6 Result

	Rider	Team	Time
1	André Greipel (GER)	Lotto–Belisol	1h 55' 16"
2	Mark Renshaw (AUS)	Omega Pharma–Quick-Step	s.t.
3	Andrew Fenn (GBR)	Omega Pharma–Quick-Step	s.t.
4	Koen de Kort (NED)	Giant–Shimano	s.t.
5	Jonathan Cantwell (AUS)	Drapac Professional Cycling	s.t.
6	Matthew Goss (AUS)	Orica–GreenEDGE	s.t.
7	Nathan Haas (AUS)	Garmin–Sharp	s.t.
8	Jürgen Roelandts (BEL)	Lotto–Belisol	s.t.
9	Michael Kolář (SVK)	Tinkoff–Saxo	s.t.
10	Mathew Hayman (AUS)	Orica–GreenEDGE	s.t.

Final General Classification

	Rider	Team	Time
1	Simon Gerrans (AUS)	Orica–GreenEDGE	19h 57' 35"
2	Cadel Evans (AUS)	BMC Racing Team	+ 1"
3	Diego Ulissi (ITA)	Lampre–Merida	+ 5"
4	Richie Porte (AUS)	Team Sky	+ 10"
5	Nathan Haas (AUS)	Garmin–Sharp	+ 27"
6	Robert Gesink (NED)	Belkin Pro Cycling	+ 30"
7	Daryl Impey (RSA)	Orica–GreenEDGE	+ 34"
8	Geraint Thomas (GBR)	Team Sky	+ 37"
9	Adam Hansen (AUS)	Lotto–Belisol	+ 37"
10	Egor Silin (RUS)	Team Katusha	+ 47"

== Classification leadership table ==
In the 2014 Tour Down Under, four different jerseys were awarded. For the general classification, calculated by adding each cyclist's finishing times on each stage, the leader received an ochre jersey. This classification was considered the most important of the 2014 Tour Down Under, and the winner of the classification was considered the winner of the race.

Additionally, there was a sprints classification, which awarded a blue jersey. In the sprints classification, cyclists received points for finishing in the top 15 in a stage. For winning a stage, a rider earned 15 points, with one point fewer per place down to a single point for 15th place. Points towards the classification could also be accrued at intermediate sprint points during each stage; these intermediate sprints also offered bonus seconds towards the general classification. There was also a mountains classification, the leadership of which was marked by a white jersey. In the mountains classification, points were won by reaching the top of a climb before other cyclists, with more points available for the higher-categorised climbs.

The fourth jersey represented the young rider classification, marked by a grey, green and pink jersey. This was decided in the same way as the general classification, but only riders born after 1 January 1988 were eligible to be ranked in the classification. There was also a classification for teams, in which the times of the best three cyclists per team on each stage were added together; the leading team at the end of the race was the team with the lowest total time, and each member of the winning team received a red jersey on the final podium. Additionally, a green jersey was awarded on the podium each day, for the most aggressive rider, or riders, of that day's stage.

Stage	Winner	General classification	Mountains classification	Sprint classification	Young rider classification	Team classification	Aggressive rider
1	Simon Gerrans	Simon Gerrans	Adam Hansen	Simon Gerrans	Carlos Verona	Lampre–Merida	Will Clarke
2	Diego Ulissi	Simon Gerrans	Adam Hansen	Simon Gerrans	Carlos Verona	Lampre–Merida	Will Clarke
3	Cadel Evans	Cadel Evans	Adam Hansen	Simon Gerrans	Kenny Elissonde	BMC Racing Team	Jens Voigt
4	André Greipel	Cadel Evans	Adam Hansen	Simon Gerrans	Jack Haig	BMC Racing Team	Cameron Wurf
5	Richie Porte	Simon Gerrans	Adam Hansen	Simon Gerrans	Jack Haig	Orica–GreenEDGE	Jens Voigt
6	André Greipel	Simon Gerrans	Adam Hansen	Simon Gerrans	Jack Haig	Orica–GreenEDGE	Will Clarke
Final		Simon Gerrans	Adam Hansen	Simon Gerrans	Jack Haig	Orica–GreenEDGE	–
