= 2012 Milan–San Remo =

2012 UCI World Tour, race 4 of 28
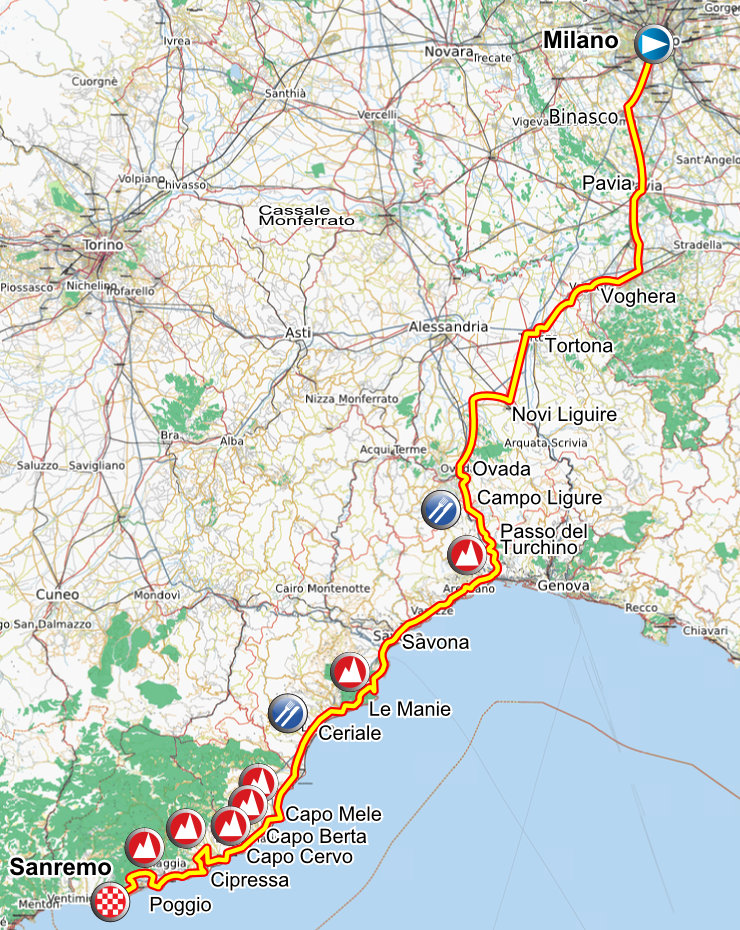
- Route of the 2012 Milan–San Remo

Race details
- Dates: 17 March 2012
- Stages: 1
- Distance: 298 km (185 mi)
- Winning time: 6h 59' 24"

Results
	Winner	Simon Gerrans (AUS)	(GreenEDGE)
	Second	Fabian Cancellara (SUI)	(RadioShack–Nissan)
	Third	Vincenzo Nibali (ITA)	(Liquigas–Cannondale)

The 2012 Milan–San Remo was the 103rd running of the Milan–San Remo single-day cycling race. It was held on 17 March over a distance of 298 kilometres (185.2 miles) and was the fourth race of the 2012 UCI World Tour season.

The race was won by GreenEDGE rider Simon Gerrans, who was part of a three-man group that battled for the victory, in a sprint finish. Gerrans finished ahead of RadioShack–Nissan's Fabian Cancellara – the winner of the race in 2008 – and Liquigas–Cannondale's Vincenzo Nibali, who completed the podium.

== Teams ==
As Milan–San Remo was a UCI World Tour event, all 18 UCI ProTeams were invited automatically and obligated to send a squad. Seven other squads were given wildcard places into the race, and as such, formed the event's 25-team peloton. Each team started with eight riders, making a starting peloton of 200.

The 25 teams that competed in the race were:

- Acqua & Sapone
- Ag2r–La Mondiale
- Astana
- BMC Racing Team
- Colnago–CSF Bardiani
- Colombia–Coldeportes
- Euskaltel–Euskadi
- Farnese Vini–Selle Italia
- FDJ–BigMat
- Garmin–Barracuda
- GreenEDGE
- Team Katusha
- Lampre–ISD
- Liquigas–Cannondale
- Lotto–Belisol
- Movistar Team
- Omega Pharma–Quick-Step
- Project 1t4i
- Rabobank
- RadioShack–Nissan
- Team Saxo Bank
- Team Sky
- Team Type 1–Sanofi
- Utensilnord–Named
- Vacansoleil–DCM

== Results ==
	Cyclist	Team	Time
1	Simon Gerrans (AUS)	GreenEDGE	6h 59' 24"
2	Fabian Cancellara (SUI)	RadioShack–Nissan	s.t.
3	Vincenzo Nibali (ITA)	Liquigas–Cannondale	s.t.
4	Peter Sagan (SVK)	Liquigas–Cannondale	+ 2"
5	John Degenkolb (GER)	Project 1t4i	+ 2"
6	Filippo Pozzato (ITA)	Farnese Vini–Selle Italia	+ 2"
7	Óscar Freire (ESP)	Team Katusha	+ 2"
8	Alessandro Ballan (ITA)	BMC Racing Team	+ 2"
9	Daniel Oss (ITA)	Liquigas–Cannondale	+ 2"
10	Daniele Bennati (ITA)	RadioShack–Nissan	+ 2"
