= 2009 GP Ouest-France =

2009 UCI World Ranking, race 22 of 24

Race details
- Dates: 23 August
- Stages: 1
- Distance: 229.2 km (142.4 mi)

Results
	Winner	Simon Gerrans (AUS)	(Cervélo TestTeam)
	Second	Pierrick Fédrigo (FRA)	(Bbox Bouygues Telecom)
	Third	Paul Martens (GER)	(Rabobank)

The 2009 GP Ouest-France was a one-day road race which took place on 23 August 2009 in Plouay, France. The race was held over 229 kilometres (142 mi), which is 12 laps of a circuit. 2009 was the fifth time that the race has been part of the UCI ProTour, but the race can be dated back to 1931 at its present location. The race was won by the Australian Simon Gerrans, his first victory in a major one-day race. Frenchman Pierrick Fédrigo came in second, with Paul Martens of Germany coming in third. Gerrans won a sprint from a five-man breakaway group which also included Anthony Roux of France and Dan Martin of Ireland.

== Results ==
Rank	Cyclist	Team	Time	UCI World Ranking Points
1	Simon Gerrans (AUS)	Cervélo TestTeam	5h 58' 53"	80
2	Pierrick Fédrigo (FRA)	Bbox Bouygues Telecom	s.t.	60
3	Paul Martens (GER)	Rabobank	s.t.	50
4	Anthony Roux (FRA)	Française des Jeux	s.t.	40
5	Dan Martin (IRL)	Garmin–Slipstream	s.t.	30
6	Luis León Sánchez Gil (ESP)	Caisse d'Epargne	+ 3"	22
7	Samuel Dumoulin (FRA)	Cofidis	s.t.	14
8	Maxim Iglinsky (KAZ)	Astana	s.t.	10
9	Frédéric Guesdon (FRA)	Française des Jeux	s.t.	6
10	Jesús Del Nero (ESP)	Fuji–Servetto	s.t.	2
