= 2014 Liège–Bastogne–Liège =

2014 UCI World Tour, race 13 of 28

Race details
- Dates: 27 April 2014
- Stages: 1
- Distance: 263 km (163 mi)
- Winning time: 6h 37' 43"

Results
	Winner	Simon Gerrans (AUS)	(Orica–GreenEDGE)
	Second	Alejandro Valverde (ESP)	(Movistar Team)
	Third	Michał Kwiatkowski (POL)	(Omega Pharma–Quick-Step)

The 2014 Liège–Bastogne–Liège was the 100th running of Liège–Bastogne–Liège, a single-day cycling race. It was held on 27 April 2014 over a distance of 263 kilometres (163.4 miles) and it was the thirteenth race of the 2014 UCI World Tour season. It was won by Simon Gerrans in a four-rider sprint finish – becoming the first Australian to win the race – ahead of Alejandro Valverde, Michał Kwiatkowski and Giampaolo Caruso.

== Teams ==
As Liège–Bastogne–Liège was a UCI World Tour event, all 18 UCI ProTeams were invited automatically and obligated to send a squad. Seven other squads were given wildcard places, thus completing the 25-team peloton.

The 25 teams that competed in the race were:

- Ag2r–La Mondiale
- Astana
- Belkin Pro Cycling
- BMC Racing Team
- Cannondale
- Cofidis
- Colombia
- Team Europcar
- FDJ.fr
- Garmin–Sharp
- Giant–Shimano
- IAM Cycling
- Team Katusha
- Lampre–Merida
- Lotto–Belisol
- Movistar Team
- MTN–Qhubeka
- NetApp–Endura
- Omega Pharma–Quick-Step
- Orica–GreenEDGE
- Team Sky
- Tinkoff–Saxo
- Topsport Vlaanderen–Baloise
- Trek Factory Racing
- Wanty–Groupe Gobert

== Results ==
	Cyclist	Team	Time	UCI World Tour Points
1	Simon Gerrans (AUS)	Orica–GreenEDGE	6h 37' 43"	100
2	Alejandro Valverde (ESP)	Movistar Team	s.t.	80
3	Michał Kwiatkowski (POL)	Omega Pharma–Quick-Step	s.t.	70
4	Giampaolo Caruso (ITA)	Team Katusha	s.t.	60
5	Domenico Pozzovivo (ITA)	Ag2r–La Mondiale	+ 3"	50
6	Tom-Jelte Slagter (NED)	Garmin–Sharp	+ 3"	40
7	Roman Kreuziger (CZE)	Tinkoff–Saxo	+ 3"	30
8	Philippe Gilbert (BEL)	BMC Racing Team	+ 3"	20
9	Daniel Moreno (ESP)	Team Katusha	+ 5"	10
10	Romain Bardet (FRA)	Ag2r–La Mondiale	+ 6"	4
