= 2015 Tour of Alberta =

2015 UCI America Tour
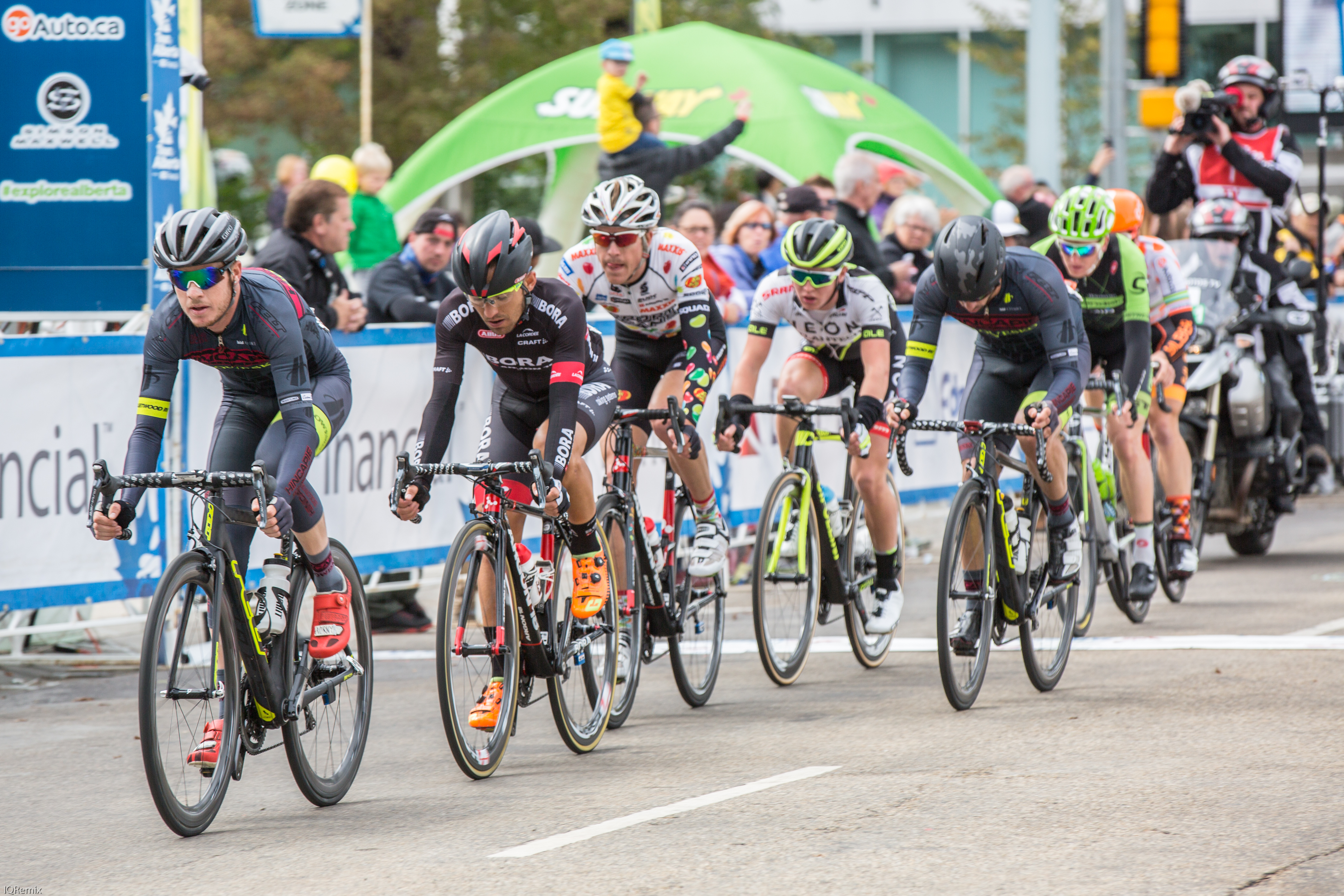
- 2015 Tour of Alberta

Race details
- Dates: 2 September 2015–7 September 2015
- Stages: 6
- Distance: 862.4 km (535.9 mi)
- Winning time: 20h 20' 28"

Results
Jersey awarded to the overall winner	Winner	Bauke Mollema (NED)	(Trek Factory Racing)
	Second	Adam Yates (GBR)	(Orica–GreenEDGE)
	Third	Tom-Jelte Slagter (NED)	(Cannondale–Garmin)
Jersey awarded to the points classification winner	Points	Michael Matthews (AUS)	(Orica–GreenEDGE)
Jersey awarded to the mountains classification winner	Mountains	Ben Perry (CAN)	(Silber Pro Cycling Team)
Jersey awarded to the youth classification winner	Youth	Adam Yates (GBR)	(Orica–GreenEDGE)
Jersey awarded to the team classification winner	Team	Cannondale–Garmin	

The 2015 Tour of Alberta was the third edition of the Tour of Alberta stage race. The event was included on the UCI America Tour, with a UCI classification of 2.1. As such, the race was only open to teams on the UCI Pro Tour, UCI Professional Continental and UCI Continental circuits. The race took place between September 2–7, 2015, as a six-day, six-stage race, traversing the province of Alberta. The race commences in Grande Prairie and finished in Edmonton. It was won by Bauke Mollema of Trek Factory Racing.

== Participating teams ==
The 15 teams invited to the race are:

UCI ProTeams
- Orica–GreenEDGE
- Cannondale–Garmin
- Team Giant–Alpecin
- Team Katusha
- Trek Factory Racing
UCI Professional Continental Teams
- Drapac Professional Cycling
- Bora–Argon 18
UCI Continental Teams
- Axeon Cycling Team
- H&R Block Pro Cycling
- Hincapie Racing Team
- Jelly Belly–Maxxis
- Lupus Racing Team
- Optum–Kelly Benefit Strategies
- Silber Pro Cycling Team
- Team SmartStop

== Stages ==
Stage results
Stage	Date	Route	Terrain	Length	Winner	Ref
1	September 2	Grande Prairie to Grande Prairie	Team time trial	19.6 km (12.2 mi)	Trek Factory Racing	
2	September 3	Grande Prairie to Grande Prairie	Hilly stage	171.6 km (106.6 mi)	Michael Matthews (AUS)	
3	September 4	Grande Cache to Miette Hot Springs	Hilly stage	181.8 km (113.0 mi)	Tom-Jelte Slagter (NED)	
4	September 5	Jasper to Marmot Basin	Mountain stage	162.1 km (100.7 mi)	Tom-Jelte Slagter (NED)	
5	September 6	Edson to Spruce Grove	Flat stage	206.2 km (128.1 mi)	Lasse Norman Hansen (DEN)	
6	September 7	Edmonton to Edmonton	Hilly stage	124.1 km (77.1 mi)	Nikias Arndt (GER)	
	Total		862.4 km (536 mi)			

=== Stage 1 ===
September 2, 2015 — Grande Prairie to Grande Prairie, 19.6 kilometres (12.2 mi)

Stage 1 Result

Rank	Team	Time
1	Trek Factory Racing	22' 57"
2	Orica–GreenEDGE	+ 0"
3	Team Katusha	+ 8"
4	Bora–Argon 18	+ 23"
5	Team Giant–Alpecin	+ 25"
6	Hincapie Racing Team	+ 26
7	Cannondale–Garmin	+ 30"
8	Drapac Professional Cycling	+ 40"
9	Silber Pro Cycling Team	+ 41"
10	Optum–Kelly Benefit Strategies	+ 44"

General classification after stage 1

Rank	Rider	Team	Time
1	Bauke Mollema (NED)	Trek Factory Racing	22' 57"
2	Jesse Sergent (NZL)	Trek Factory Racing	s.t.
3	Hayden Roulston (NZL)	Trek Factory Racing	s.t.
4	Marco Coledan (ITA)	Trek Factory Racing	s.t.
5	Matthew Busche (USA)	Trek Factory Racing	s.t.
6	Christian Meier (CAN)	Orica–GreenEDGE	s.t.
7	Svein Tuft (CAN)	Orica–GreenEDGE	s.t.
8	Michael Matthews (AUS)	Orica–GreenEDGE	s.t.
9	Adam Yates (GBR)	Orica–GreenEDGE	s.t.
10	Luke Durbridge (AUS)	Orica–GreenEDGE	s.t.

=== Stage 6 ===
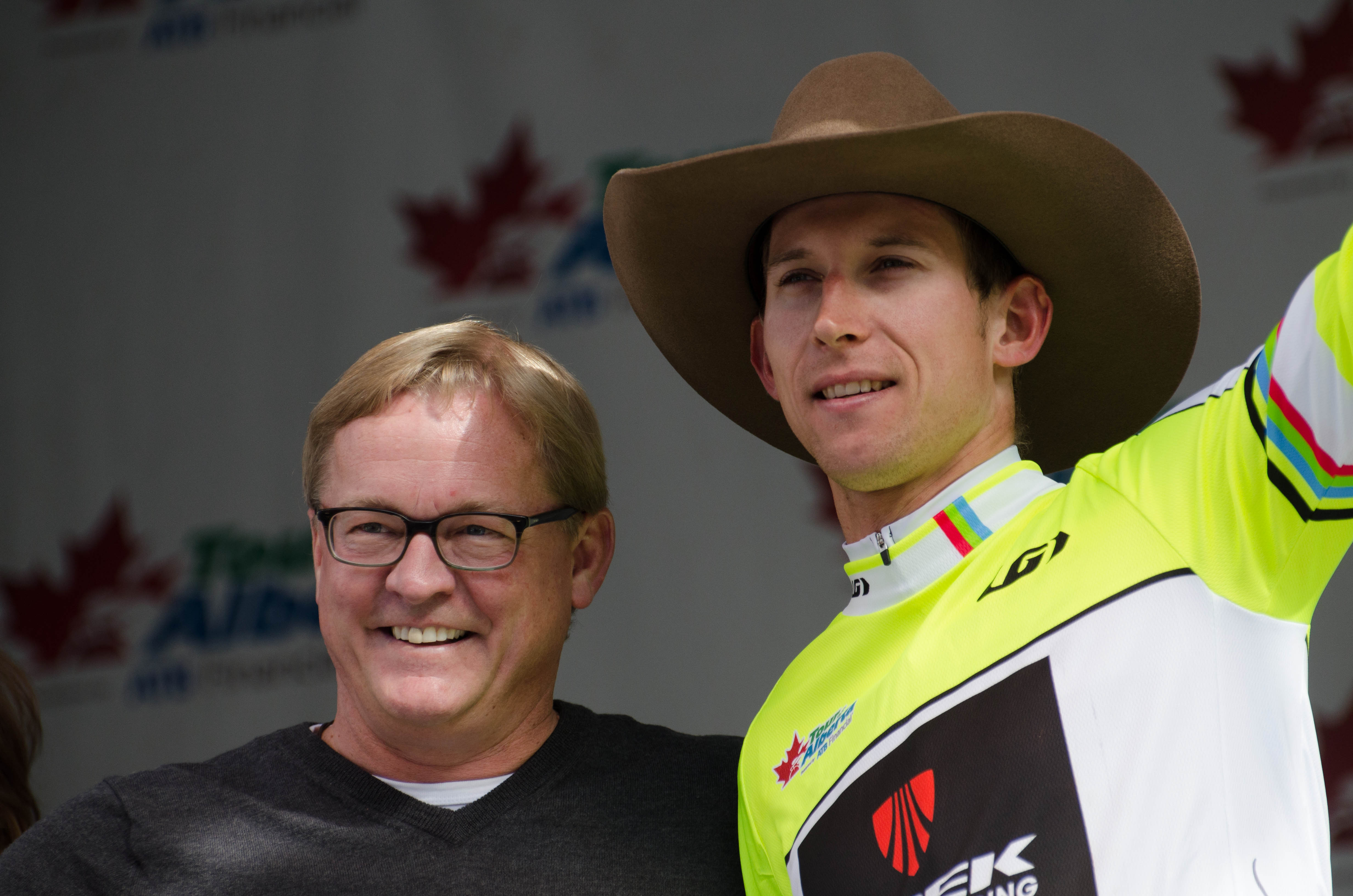
Mollema (right) with Alberta Culture Minister David Eggen following his win of the 2015 Tour of Alberta.

== Classification leadership ==
Stage	Winner	General classification	Sprints classification	Mountains classification	Young rider classification	Canadian rider classification	Most Aggressive	Team classification
1	Trek Factory Racing	Bauke Mollema	Not awarded	Not awarded	Adam Yates	Svein Tuft	Not awarded	Trek Factory Racing
2	Michael Matthews	Michael Matthews	Michael Matthews	Ben Perry	Adam Yates	Christian Meier	Thomas Vaubourzeix	Orica–GreenEDGE
3	Tom-Jelte Slagter	Bauke Mollema	Tom-Jelte Slagter	Ben Perry	Adam Yates	Ryder Hesjedal	Jasper Bovenhuis	Cannondale–Garmin
4	Tom-Jelte Slagter	Bauke Mollema	Tom-Jelte Slagter	Ben Perry	Adam Yates	Mike Woods	Logan Owen	Hincapie Racing
5	Lasse Norman Hansen	Bauke Mollema	Tom-Jelte Slagter	Ben Perry	Adam Yates	Mike Woods	Lasse Norman Hansen	Cannondale–Garmin
6	Nikias Arndt	Bauke Mollema	Michael Matthews	Ben Perry	Adam Yates	Mike Woods	Cesare Benedetti	Cannondale–Garmin
Final		Bauke Mollema	Michael Matthews	Ben Perry	Adam Yates	Mike Woods	Not awarded	Cannondale-Garmin
