= 2014 Grand Prix Cycliste de Montréal =

2014 UCI World Tour, race 26 of 29

Race details
- Dates: 14 September 2014
- Stages: 1
- Distance: 205.7 km (127.8 mi)
- Winning time: 5h 24' 27"

Results
	Winner	Simon Gerrans (AUS)	(Orica–GreenEDGE)
	Second	Rui Costa (POR)	(Lampre–Merida)
	Third	Tony Gallopin (FRA)	(Lotto–Belisol)

The 2014 Grand Prix Cycliste de Montréal was the fifth edition of the Grand Prix Cycliste de Montréal, a single-day professional bicycle road race. It was held on 14 September 2014, over a distance of 205.7 km (127.8 mi), starting and finishing in Montréal. It was the 26th event of the 2014 UCI World Tour season. The race is one of the only two events which are part of the World Tour calendar in North America, the other one being the 2014 Grand Prix Cycliste de Québec contested two days earlier.

== Teams ==
As the Grand Prix Cycliste de Montréal was a UCI World Tour event, all 18 UCI ProTeams were invited automatically and obligated to send a squad. A Canadian national squad also competed in the race, and as such, forming the event's 19-team peloton.

The 19 teams that competed in the race were:

- Ag2r–La Mondiale
- Astana
- Belkin Pro Cycling
- BMC Racing Team
- Canada (national team) †
- Cannondale
- FDJ.fr
- Garmin–Sharp
- Giant–Shimano
- Team Katusha
- Lampre–Merida
- Lotto–Belisol
- Movistar Team
- Omega Pharma–Quick-Step
- Orica–GreenEDGE
- Team Europcar
- Team Sky
- Tinkoff–Saxo
- Trek Factory Racing

== Course ==
The race consisted of 17 laps of a circuit 12.1 km (7.5 mi) in length, and followed the same path as the 2011 edition. The circuit, around the main campus of the Université de Montréal, was well-suited for climbers and punchers with three climbs per lap. The finish was on an uphill climb with a small gradient of 4%, that was located on Avenue du Parc. There was a sharp, 180 degrees bend to the right situated 500 meters away from the line. The total vertical climb of the race was 3,893 meters. The major difficulties were:

- Kilometre 2: Côte Camilien-Houde: 1,8 kilometres, average gradient of 8%
- Kilometre 6: Côte de la Polytechnque: 780 metres, average gradient of 6% with a pass of 200 metres at 11%
- Kilometre 11: Avenue du Parc: 560 metres, average gradient of 4%

== Results ==
	Cyclist	Team	Time	UCI World Tour Points
1	Simon Gerrans (AUS)	Orica–GreenEDGE	5h 24' 27"	80
2	Rui Costa (POR)	Lampre–Merida	+ 0"	60
3	Tony Gallopin (FRA)	Lotto–Belisol	+ 0"	50
4	Ramūnas Navardauskas (LTU)	Garmin–Sharp	+ 0"	40
5	Romain Bardet (FRA)	Ag2r–La Mondiale	+ 0"	30
6	Tom Dumoulin (NED)	Giant–Shimano	+ 0"	22
7	Greg Van Avermaet (BEL)	BMC Racing Team	+ 0"	14
8	Jonathan Hivert (FRA)	Belkin Pro Cycling	+ 0"	10
9	Enrico Gasparotto (ITA)	Astana	+ 0"	6
10	Bauke Mollema (NED)	Belkin Pro Cycling	+ 0"	2
