= 2014 Grand Prix Cycliste de Québec =

2014 UCI World Tour, race 25 of 29

Race details
- Dates: 12 September 2014
- Stages: 1
- Distance: 199.1 km (123.7 mi)
- Winning time: 4h 42' 54"

Results
	Winner	Simon Gerrans (AUS)	(Orica–GreenEDGE)
	Second	Tom Dumoulin (NED)	(Giant–Shimano)
	Third	Ramūnas Navardauskas (LTU)	(Garmin–Sharp)

The 2014 Grand Prix Cycliste de Québec was the fifth edition of the Grand Prix Cycliste de Québec, a single-day professional bicycle road race. It was held on 12 September 2014, over a distance of 199.1 kilometres (123.7 miles), starting and finishing in Quebec City. It was the 25th event of the 2014 UCI World Tour season. The race was one of only two events which are part of the World Tour calendar in North America, the other one being the 2014 Grand Prix Cycliste de Montréal contested two days later.

== Teams ==
As the Grand Prix Cycliste de Québec was a UCI World Tour event, all 18 UCI ProTeams were invited automatically and obligated to send a squad. A Canadian national squad also competed in the race, and as such, forming the event's 19-team peloton.

The 19 teams that competed in the race were:

- Ag2r–La Mondiale
- Astana
- Belkin Pro Cycling
- BMC Racing Team
- Canada (national team) †
- Cannondale
- FDJ.fr
- Garmin–Sharp
- Giant–Shimano
- Team Katusha
- Lampre–Merida
- Lotto–Belisol
- Movistar Team
- Omega Pharma–Quick-Step
- Orica–GreenEDGE
- Team Europcar
- Team Sky
- Tinkoff–Saxo
- Trek Factory Racing

== Results ==
	Cyclist	Team	Time	UCI World Tour Points
1	Simon Gerrans (AUS)	Orica–GreenEDGE	4h 42' 54"	80
2	Tom Dumoulin (NED)	Giant–Shimano	+ 0"	60
3	Ramūnas Navardauskas (LTU)	Garmin–Sharp	+ 0"	50
4	Daryl Impey (RSA)	Orica–GreenEDGE	+ 0"	40
5	Greg Van Avermaet (BEL)	BMC Racing Team	+ 0"	30
6	Gianni Meersman (BEL)	Omega Pharma–Quick-Step	+ 0"	22
7	Sep Vanmarcke (BEL)	Belkin Pro Cycling	+ 0"	14
8	Enrico Gasparotto (ITA)	Astana	+ 0"	10
9	Tony Gallopin (FRA)	Lotto–Belisol	+ 0"	6
10	Bauke Mollema (NED)	Belkin Pro Cycling	+ 0"	2
