= 2017 Grand Prix Cycliste de Montréal =

2017 UCI World Tour, race 34 of 37
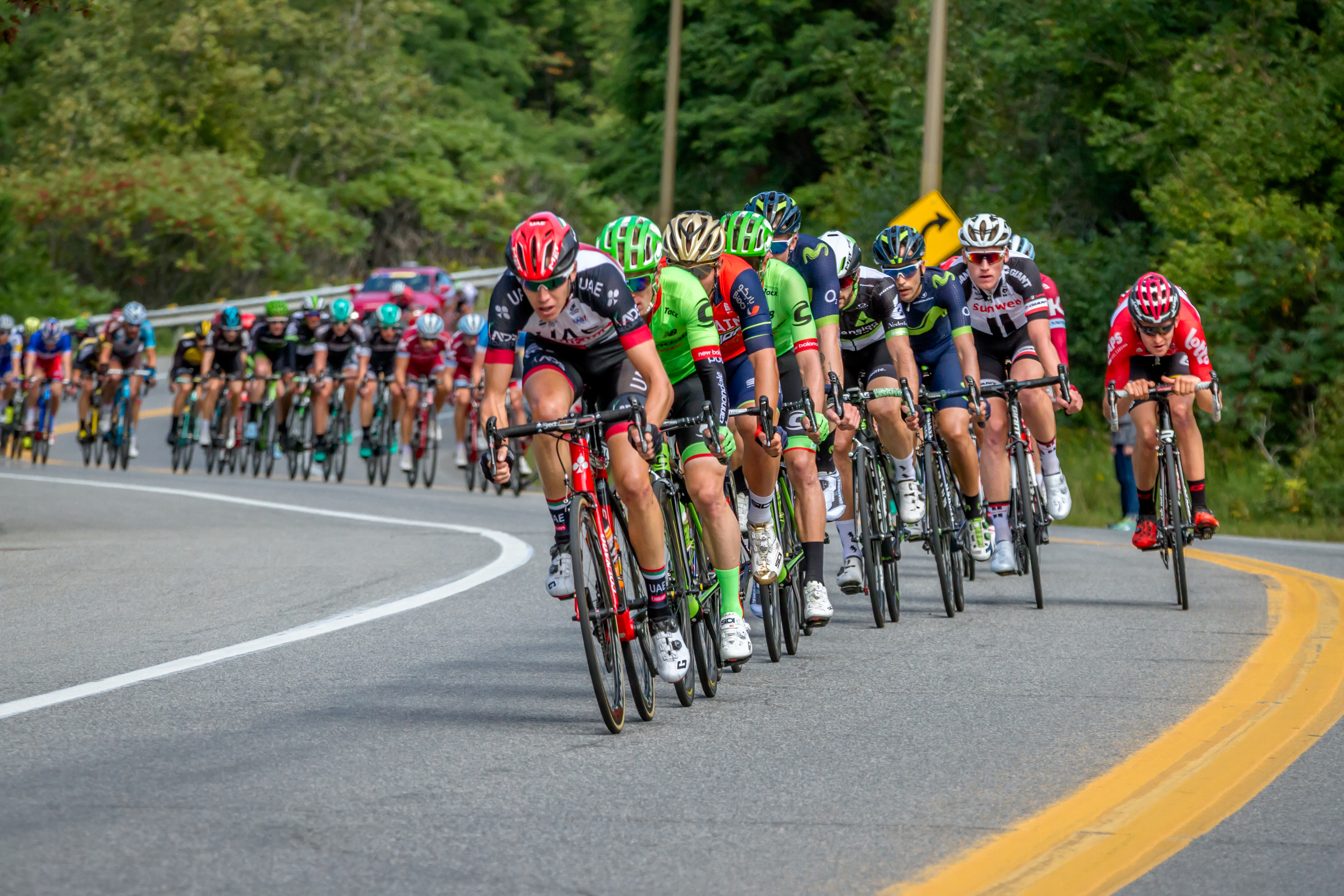
- Peloton descending

Race details
- Dates: 10 September 2017
- Stages: 1
- Distance: 205.7 km (127.8 mi)
- Winning time: 5h 22' 29"

Results
	Winner	Diego Ulissi (ITA)	(UAE Team Emirates)
	Second	Jesús Herrada (ESP)	(Movistar Team)
	Third	Tom-Jelte Slagter (NED)	(Cannondale–Drapac)

The 2017 Grand Prix Cycliste de Montréal is a road cycling one-day race that took place on 10 September. It was the 8th edition of the Grand Prix Cycliste de Montréal and the 34th event of the 2017 UCI World Tour. It was won by Italian rider Diego Ulissi of UAE Team Emirates in a sprint finish.

== Result ==
Final general classification

Rank	Rider	Team	Time
1	Diego Ulissi (ITA)	UAE Team Emirates	5h 22' 29"
2	Jesús Herrada (ESP)	Movistar Team	s.t.
3	Tom-Jelte Slagter (NED)	Cannondale–Drapac	s.t.
4	Jan Bakelants (BEL)	AG2R La Mondiale	s.t.
5	Bauke Mollema (NED)	Trek–Segafredo	+ 6"
6	Tony Gallopin (FRA)	Lotto–Soudal	+ 11"
7	Greg Van Avermaet (BEL)	BMC Racing Team	+ 16"
8	Michael Matthews (AUS)	Team Sunweb	s.t.
9	Peter Sagan (SVK)	Bora–Hansgrohe	s.t.
10	Sep Vanmarcke (BEL)	Cannondale–Drapac	s.t.
