= Anthony Roux =

French road bicycle racer

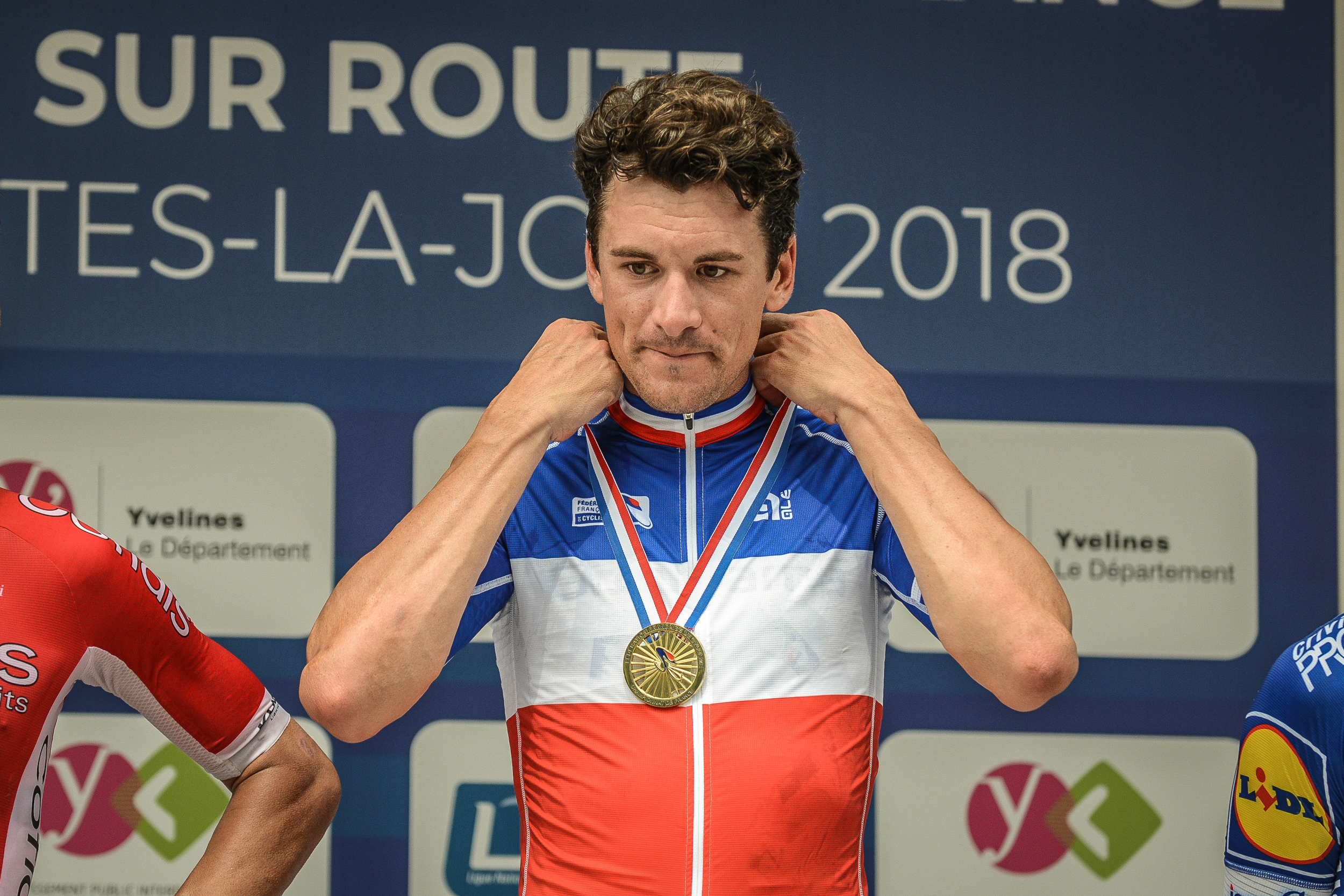
- Roux in 2018

Personal information
- Full name: Anthony Roux
- Born: 18 April 1987 (age 39) Verdun, France
- Height: 1.89 m (6 ft 2 1/2 in)
- Weight: 70 kg (154 lb)

Cycling career
- Sport: Cycling
- Discipline: Road
- Role: Rider
- Rider type: Rouleur; Puncheur

Amateur teams
- 2005: US Thiervilloise
- 2006: Vendée U
- 2007: UV Aube
- 2007: Française des Jeux (stagiaire)

Professional team
- 2008–2022: Française des Jeux

Major wins
- Grand Tours Vuelta a España 1 individual stage (2009) Single-day races and Classics National Road Race Championships (2018)

Anthony Roux (born 18 April 1987) is a French former road bicycle racer, who competed as a professional from 2008 to 2022 for UCI WorldTeam Groupama–FDJ.

== Major results ==
2005
1st Overall Tour de Lorraine Juniors
8th Overall GP Général Patton

1st Stage 1

2007
2nd Liège–Bastogne–Liège Espoirs
3rd Time trial, National Under-23 Road Championships
2008
2nd Overall Grand Prix du Portugal
4th Overall Tour du Poitou-Charentes
5th Overall La Tropicale Amissa Bongo
10th Trophée des Grimpeurs
2009
1st Stage 17 Vuelta a España
1st Stage 4 Circuit de la Sarthe
2nd Boucles de l'Aulne
3rd Road race, National Road Championships
4th GP Ouest–France
7th Overall Circuit de Lorraine
10th Overall La Tropicale Amissa Bongo
2010
1st Stage 5 Circuit de Lorraine
1st Stage 1 Tour du Poitou-Charentes
2nd Duo Normand (with Jérémy Roy)
4th Overall Circuit de la Sarthe
4th Paris–Camembert
2011
1st Overall Circuit de la Sarthe

1st Young rider classification
1st Stage 4

1st Overall Circuit de Lorraine

1st Points classification
1st Stages 1 & 4

1st Tour de la Somme
National Road Championships

2nd Road race
4th Time trial

2nd Duo Normand (with Jérémy Roy)
8th Overall Tour du Limousin
2012
Combativity award Stage 2 Tour de France
2013
Vuelta a Burgos

1st Points classification
1st Stage 4

1st Points classification, Route du Sud
3rd Overall Étoile de Bessèges

1st Stage 6 (ITT)

4th Grand Prix d'Ouverture La Marseillaise
4th Road race, National Road Championships
6th Trofeo Laigueglia
2014
2nd Time trial, National Road Championships
4th Overall Circuit de la Sarthe
5th Paris–Camembert
2015
1st Stage 2a Circuit de la Sarthe
6th GP Ouest–France
7th Grand Prix de la Somme
2016
2nd Time trial, National Road Championships
3rd Grand Prix Cycliste de Québec
5th Time trial, UEC European Road Championships
6th Overall Tour du Poitou-Charentes
9th Grand Prix Cycliste de Montréal
10th Overall Tour La Provence
2017
3rd Time trial, National Road Championships
7th Clásica de San Sebastián
2018
National Road Championships

1st Road race
4th Time trial

1st Stage 4 Route d'Occitanie
3rd Overall Tour du Limousin

1st Stage 1

3rd Clásica de San Sebastián
10th Grand Prix Cycliste de Québec
2020
9th Bretagne Classic
10th Time trial, UEC European Road Championships

=== Grand Tour general classification results timeline ===
| Grand Tour | 2009 | 2010 | 2011 | 2012 | 2013 | 2014 | 2015 | 2016 | 2017 | 2018 | 2019 | 2020 | 2021 |
|---|---|---|---|---|---|---|---|---|---|---|---|---|---|
| Giro d'Italia | — | — | — | — | DNF | — | 87 | — | — | 76 | — | — | — |
| Tour de France | — | 164 | 101 | 126 | — | — | — | 63 | — | — | 102 | — | — |
| / Vuelta a España | 120 | — | — | — | 34 | DNF | — | — | 52 | — | — | 66 | 58 |

Legend
| — | Did not compete |
| DNF | Did not finish |
