= 2012 in men's road cycling =

== Olympic Games ==
Race	Date	Winner	Second	Third
(International Olympic Committee) Men's Road race	July 28	Alexander Vinokourov (KAZ)	Rigoberto Urán (COL)	Alexander Kristoff (NOR)
(International Olympic Committee) Men's Time trial	August 1	Bradley Wiggins (GBR)	Tony Martin (GER)	Chris Froome (GBR)

== World Championships ==
The World Road Championships was held in Limburg, Netherlands.

Race	Date	Winner	Second	Third
World Championship Team Time Trial	September 16	(Belgium) Omega Pharma–Quick-Step	(United States) BMC Racing Team	(Australia) Orica–GreenEDGE
World Championship Time Trial	September 19	Tony Martin (GER)	Taylor Phinney (USA)	Vasil Kiryienka (BLR)
World Championship Road Race	September 23	Philippe Gilbert (BEL)	Edvald Boasson Hagen (NOR)	Alejandro Valverde (ESP)

== Grand Tours ==
Race	Date	Winner	Second	Third
(Italy) Giro d'Italia	May 5–27	Ryder Hesjedal (CAN)	Joaquim Rodríguez (ESP)	Thomas De Gendt (BEL)
Tour de France	June 30 – July 22	Bradley Wiggins (GBR)	Chris Froome (GBR)	Vincenzo Nibali (ITA)
(Spain) Vuelta a España	August 18 – September 9	Alberto Contador (ESP)	Alejandro Valverde (ESP)	Joaquim Rodríguez (ESP)

== UCI World Tour ==
Race	Date	Winner	Second	Third
(Australia) Tour Down Under	January 17–22	Simon Gerrans (AUS)	Alejandro Valverde (ESP)	Tiago Machado (POR)
(France) Paris–Nice	March 4–11	Bradley Wiggins (GBR)	Lieuwe Westra (NED)	Alejandro Valverde (ESP)
(Italy) Tirreno–Adriatico	March 7–13	Vincenzo Nibali (ITA)	Chris Horner (USA)	Roman Kreuziger (CZE)
(Italy) Milan–San Remo	March 17	Simon Gerrans (AUS)	Fabian Cancellara (SWI)	Vincenzo Nibali (ITA)
(Spain) Volta a Catalunya	March 19–25	Michael Albasini (SUI)	Samuel Sánchez (ESP)	Jurgen Van den Broeck (BEL)
(Belgium) E3 Harelbeke	March 23	Tom Boonen (BEL)	Óscar Freire (ESP)	Bernhard Eisel (AUT)
(Belgium) Gent–Wevelgem	March 25	Tom Boonen (BEL)	Peter Sagan (SVK)	Matti Breschel (DEN)
(Belgium) Tour of Flanders	April 1	Tom Boonen (BEL)	Filippo Pozzato (ITA)	Alessandro Ballan (ITA)
(Spain) Tour of the Basque Country	April 2–7	Samuel Sánchez (ESP)	Joaquim Rodríguez (ESP)	Bauke Mollema (NED)
(France) Paris–Roubaix	April 8	Tom Boonen (BEL)	Sébastien Turgot (FRA)	Alessandro Ballan (ITA)
(Netherlands) Amstel Gold Race	April 15	Enrico Gasparotto (ITA)	Jelle Vanendert (BEL)	Peter Sagan (SVK)
(Belgium) La Flèche Wallonne	April 18	Joaquim Rodríguez (ESP)	Michael Albasini (SUI)	Philippe Gilbert (BEL)
(Belgium) Liège–Bastogne–Liège	April 22	Maxim Iglinsky (KAZ)	Vincenzo Nibali (ITA)	Enrico Gasparotto (ITA)
(Switzerland) Tour de Romandie	April 24–29	Bradley Wiggins (GBR)	Andrew Talansky (USA)	Rui Costa (POR)
(France) Critérium du Dauphiné	June 3–10	Bradley Wiggins (GBR)	Michael Rogers (AUS)	Cadel Evans (AUS)
(Switzerland) Tour de Suisse	June 9–17	Rui Costa (POR)	Fränk Schleck (LUX)	Levi Leipheimer (USA)
(Poland) Tour de Pologne	July 10–16	Moreno Moser (ITA)	Michał Kwiatkowski (POL)	Sergio Henao (COL)
(Belgium) (Netherlands) Eneco Tour	August 6–12	Lars Boom (NED)	Sylvain Chavanel (FRA)	Niki Terpstra (NED)
(Spain) Clásica de San Sebastián	August 14	Luis León Sánchez (ESP)	Simon Gerrans (AUS)	Gianni Meersman (BEL)
(Germany) Vattenfall Cyclassics	August 19	Arnaud Démare (FRA)	André Greipel (GER)	Giacomo Nizzolo (ITA)
GP Ouest-France	August 26	Edvald Boasson Hagen (NOR)	Rui Costa (POR)	Heinrich Haussler (AUS)
(Canada) GP de Québec	September 7	Simon Gerrans (AUS)	Greg Van Avermaet (BEL)	Rui Costa (POR)
(Canada) GP de Montréal	September 9	Lars Petter Nordhaug (NOR)	Moreno Moser (ITA)	Alexandr Kolobnev (RUS)
(Italy) Giro di Lombardia	September 29	Joaquim Rodríguez (ESP)	Samuel Sánchez (ESP)	Rigoberto Urán (COL)
(China) Tour of Beijing	October 9–13	Tony Martin (GER)	Francesco Gavazzi (ITA)	Edvald Boasson Hagen (NOR)

== 2.HC Category Races ==
Race	Date	Winner	Second	Third
Tour of Qatar	February 5–10	Tom Boonen (BEL)	Tyler Farrar (USA)	Juan Antonio Flecha (ESP)
Tour of Oman	February 14–19	Peter Velits (SVK)	Vincenzo Nibali (ITA)	Tony Gallopin (FRA)
(Malaysia) Tour de Langkawi	February 24 – March 4	José Serpa (COL)	José Rujano (VEN)	Victor Niño (COL)
(France) Critérium International	March 24–25	Cadel Evans (AUS)	Pierrick Fédrigo (FRA)	Michael Rogers (AUS)
(Belgium) Three Days of De Panne	March 27–29	Sylvain Chavanel (FRA)	Lieuwe Westra (NED)	Maciej Bodnar (POL)
(Italy) Giro del Trentino	April 17–20	Domenico Pozzovivo (ITA)	Damiano Cunego (ITA)	Sylwester Szmyd (POL)
Presidential Tour of Turkey	April 22–29	Ivailo Gabrovski (BUL)	Alexsandr Dyachenko (KAZ)	Danail Petrov (BUL)
(France) Four Days of Dunkirk	May 4–8	Jimmy Engoulvent (FRA)	Zdeněk Štybar (CZE)	John Degenkolb (GER)
(United States) Tour of California	May 13–20	Robert Gesink (NED)	David Zabriskie (USA)	Tom Danielson (USA)
Tour of Belgium	May 23–27	Tony Martin (GER)	Lieuwe Westra (NED)	Carlos Barredo (ESP)
(Germany) Bayern-Rundfahrt	May 23–27	Michael Rogers (AUS)	Jérôme Coppel (FRA)	Vladimir Gusev (RUS)
Tour de Luxembourg	May 30 – June 3	Jakob Fuglsang (DEN)	Wout Poels (NED)	Fränk Schleck (LUX)
(Austria) Österreich Rundfahrt	July 1–8	Jakob Fuglsang (DEN)	Steve Morabito (SUI)	Robert Vrečer (SLO)
(China) Tour of Qinghai Lake	July 13–22	Hossein Alizadeh (IRN)	Cameron Wurf (AUS)	Giovanny Báez (COL)
(Belgium) Tour de Wallonie	July 21–25	Giacomo Nizzolo (ITA)	Gianni Meersman (BEL)	Pim Ligthart (NED)
(Spain) Vuelta a Burgos	August 1–5	Daniel Moreno (ESP)	Sergio Henao (COL)	Esteban Chaves (COL)
(France) Tour du Limousin	August 14–17	Yukiya Arashiro (JPN)	Jérémy Roy (FRA)	Fabien Schmidt (FRA)
(United States) USA Pro Cycling Challenge	August 20–26	Christian Vande Velde (USA)	Tejay van Garderen (USA)	Levi Leipheimer (USA)
(Denmark) Damark Rundt	August 22–26	Lieuwe Westra (NED)	Ramūnas Navardauskas (LTU)	Manuele Boaro (ITA)
(China) Tour of Hainan	October 20–28	Dmitriy Gruzdev (KAZ)	Valentin Iglinskiy (KAZ)	Tobias Ludvigsson (SWE)

== 1.HC Category Races ==
Race	Date	Winner	Second	Third
(Belgium) Omloop Het Nieuwsblad	February 25	Sep Vanmarcke (BEL)	Tom Boonen (BEL)	Juan Antonio Flecha (ESP)
(Spain) Clásica de Almería	February 26	Michael Matthews (AUS)	Borut Božič (SLO)	Roger Kluge (GER)
(Spain) GP Miguel Induráin	March 31	Daniel Moreno (ESP)	Mikel Landa (ESP)	Ángel Madrazo (ESP)
(Belgium) Scheldeprijs	April 4	Marcel Kittel (GER)	Tyler Farrar (USA)	Theo Bos (NED)
(Belgium) Brabantse Pijl	April 11	Thomas Voeckler (FRA)	Óscar Freire (ESP)	Pieter Serry (BEL)
(Germany) Rund um den Finanzplatz	May 1	Moreno Moser (ITA)	Dominik Nerz (GER)	Sergey Firsanov (RUS)
(United States) TD Bank International Cycling Championship	June 2	Alexander Serebryakov (RUS)	Aldo Ino Ilešič (SLO)	Fred Rodriguez (USA)
(Italy) Tre Valli Varesine	August 18	David Veilleux (CAN)	Andrea Palini (ITA)	Danilo Di Luca (ITA)
(Belgium) Paris–Bruxelles	September 8	Tom Boonen (BEL)	Mark Renshaw (AUS)	Óscar Freire (ESP)
(France) Grand Prix de Fourmies	September 9	Lars Bak (DEN)	Alexander Kristoff (NOR)	Marcel Kittel (GER)
(Italy) Milano–Torino	September 26	Alberto Contador (ESP)	Diego Ulissi (ITA)	Fredrik Kessiakoff (SWE)
(Italy) Giro del Piemonte	September 27	Rigoberto Urán (COL)	Luca Paolini (ITA)	Gorka Verdugo (ESP)
(Italy) Giro dell'Emilia	October 6	Nairo Quintana (COL)	Fredrik Kessiakoff (SWE)	Franco Pellizotti (ITA)
(France) Paris–Tours	October 7	Marco Marcato (ITA)	Laurens De Vreese (BEL)	Niki Terpstra (NED)
(France) Tour de Vendée	October 14	Wesley Kreder (NED)	Sébastien Hinault (FRA)	Jonathan Hivert (FRA)
Japan Cup	October 21	Ivan Basso (ITA)	Dan Martin (IRL)	Rafał Majka (POL)

== UCI tours ==
Tour	Individual champion	Individual champion's team	Team champion	Nations champion
World Tour	Joaquim Rodríguez (ESP)	Team Katusha	Team Sky	Spain
Africa Tour	Tarik Chaoufi (MAR)	No team	MTN–Qhubeka	Morocco
America Tour	Maximiliano Richeze (ARG)	Team Nippo	Funvic–Pindamonhangaba	Colombia
Asia Tour	Hossein Alizadeh (IRN)	Tabriz Petrochemical Team	Terengganu Cycling Team	Japan
Europe Tour	John Degenkolb (GER)	Argos–Shimano	Saur–Sojasun	Italy
Oceania Tour	Paul Odlin (NZL)	Subway Cycling Team	Team Jayco–AIS	Australia

== Continental Championships ==
=== African Cycling Championships ===
Race	Date	Winner	Second	Third
Road race	November 13, 2011	Natnael Berhane (ERI)	Tesfay Abraha (ERI)	Reinardt Janse van Rensburg (RSA)
Individual time trial	November 11, 2011	Daniel Teklehaymanot (ERI)	Louis Meintjes (RSA)	Reinardt Janse van Rensburg (RSA)
Team time trial	November 9, 2011	Eritrea Daniel Teklehaymanot Frekalsi Debesay; Natnael Berhane Jani Tewelde	South Africa Reinardt Janse van Rensburg Jaco Venter; Louis Meintjes Herman Fouche	Morocco Adil Jelloul Mouhssine Lahsaini; Abdelatif Saadoune Reda Aadel

=== Asian Cycling Championships ===
Race	Date	Winner	Second	Third
Road race	February	Wong Kam Po (HKG)	Mehdi Sohrabi (IRI)	Taiji Nishitani (JPN)
Individual time trial	February	Evgeny Vakker (KGZ)	Dmitriy Gruzdev (KAZ)	Hossein Askari (IRI)

=== U23 European Championships ===
Race	Date	Winner	Second	Third
Road race		(Slovenia) Jan Tratnik	(Latvia) Andžs Flaksis	(Netherlands) Wouter Wippert
Individual time trial		(Denmark) Rasmus Quaade	(Luxembourg) Bob Jungels	(Ukraine) Oleksandr Golovash

=== Oceania Cycling Championships ===
Race	Date	Winner	Second	Third
Road race		(New Zealand) Paul Odlin	(Australia) Nick Aitken	(Australia) Mark O'Brien
Individual time trial		(New Zealand) Sam Horgan	(New Zealand) Paul Odlin	(Australia) Michael Cupitt

== See also ==
- 2012 in women's road cycling
