= 2012 Astana season =

Astana
- 2012 season
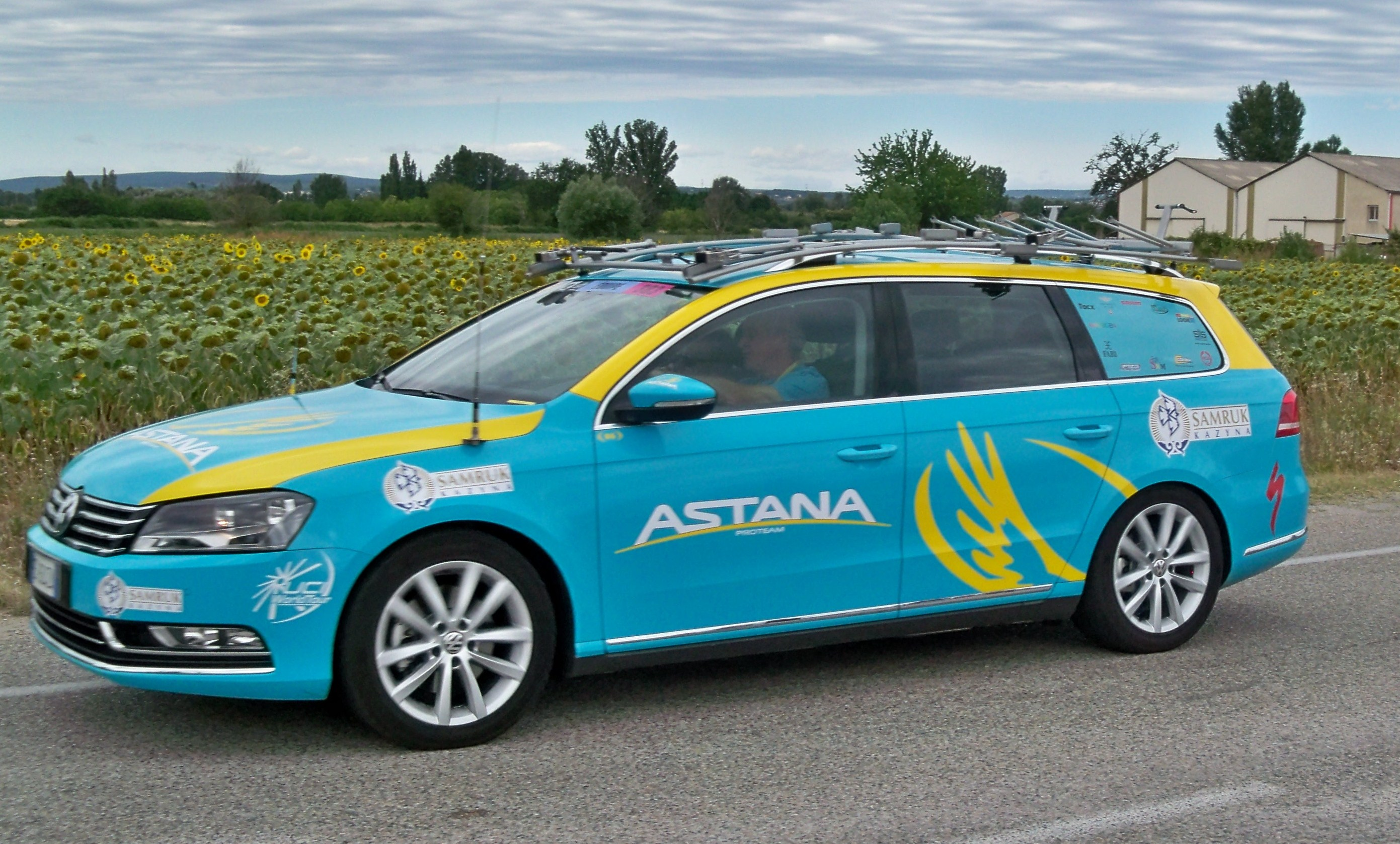
- The team car at the 2012 Tour de France
- UCI code: AST
- Status: UCI ProTeam
- World Tour Rank: 10th (645 points)
- Manager: Giuseppe Martinelli
- Main sponsor(s): Samruk-Kazyna
- Based: Kazakhstan
- Bicycles: Specialized
- Groupset: SRAM?

Season victories
- One-day races: 2
- Stage race overall: 3 (Note: Alexsandr Dyachenko gained a stage win as well as the overall victory in the Tour of Turkey, after initial winner Ivailo Gabrovski tested positive for erythropoietin (EPO) during the event.)
- Stage race stages: 10
- National Championships: 6
- Best ranked rider: Roman Kreuziger (20th)

The 2012 season for the Astana cycling team began in January with the Tour Down Under. As a UCI ProTeam, they were automatically invited and obligated to send a squad to every event in the UCI World Tour.

== 2012 roster ==
Ages as of 1 January 2012.

Rider	Date of birth
Fabio Aru (Note: Aru joined the team on 1 August, as a stagiaire, from Palazzago-Elledent-RAD Logistica.) (ITA)	3 July 1990 (aged 21)
Assan Bazayev (KAZ)	22 February 1981 (aged 30)
Borut Božič (SLO)	8 August 1980 (aged 31)
Janez Brajkovič (SLO)	18 December 1983 (aged 28)
Alexsandr Dyachenko (KAZ)	17 October 1983 (aged 28)
Dmitry Fofonov (KAZ)	15 August 1976 (aged 35)
Enrico Gasparotto (ITA)	22 March 1982 (aged 29)
Francesco Gavazzi (ITA)	1 August 1984 (aged 27)
Dmitriy Gruzdev (KAZ)	13 March 1986 (aged 25)
Jacopo Guarnieri (ITA)	14 August 1987 (aged 24)
Andriy Hryvko (UKR)	7 August 1983 (aged 28)
Maxim Iglinskiy (KAZ)	18 April 1981 (aged 30)
Valentin Iglinskiy (KAZ)	12 May 1984 (aged 27)
Tanel Kangert (EST)	11 March 1987 (aged 24)

Rider	Date of birth
Andrey Kashechkin (KAZ)	21 March 1980 (aged 31)
Fredrik Kessiakoff (SWE)	17 May 1980 (aged 31)
Robert Kišerlovski (CRO)	9 August 1986 (aged 25)
Roman Kreuziger (CZE)	6 May 1986 (aged 25)
Francesco Masciarelli (Note: Masciarelli left the team on 6 June.) (ITA)	5 May 1986 (aged 25)
Dimitry Muravyev (KAZ)	2 November 1979 (aged 32)
Yevgeniy Nepomnyachshiy (KAZ)	12 March 1987 (aged 24)
Evgeni Petrov (RUS)	25 May 1978 (aged 33)
Simone Ponzi (ITA)	17 January 1987 (aged 24)
Sergey Renev (KAZ)	3 January 1985 (aged 26)
Kevin Seeldraeyers (BEL)	12 September 1986 (aged 25)
Egor Silin (RUS)	25 June 1988 (aged 23)
Paolo Tiralongo (ITA)	8 July 1977 (aged 34)
Alexander Vinokourov (KAZ)	16 September 1973 (aged 38)
Andrey Zeits (KAZ)	14 December 1986 (aged 25)

Riders who joined the team for the 2012 season

Rider	2011 team
Andrey Kashechkin	Lampre–ISD
Dimitry Muravyev	Team RadioShack
Jacopo Guarnieri	Liquigas–Cannondale
Egor Silin	Team Katusha
Francesco Gavazzi	Lampre–ISD
Kevin Seeldraeyers	Quick-Step
Borut Božič	Vacansoleil–DCM
Janez Brajkovič	Team RadioShack
Dmitriy Gruzdev	stagiaire (Astana)
Simone Ponzi	Liquigas–Cannondale

Riders who left the team during or after the 2011 season

Rider	2012 team
Rémy Di Gregorio	Cofidis
Simon Clarke	GreenEDGE
Tomas Vaitkus	GreenEDGE
Allan Davis	GreenEDGE
Mirco Lorenzetto	Retired
Gorazd Štangelj	Retired
Roman Kireyev	Retired
Maxim Gourov	None
Josep Jufré	Retired
Andrey Mizurov	Tabriz Petrochemical Cycling Team

== Season victories ==
Date	Race	Competition	Rider	Country	Location
21 March	Volta a Catalunya, Stage 3	UCI World Tour	Janez Brajkovič (SLO)	Spain	Canturri
15 April	Amstel Gold Race	UCI World Tour	Enrico Gasparotto (ITA)	Netherlands	Valkenburg
22 April	Liège–Bastogne–Liège	UCI World Tour	Maxim Iglinsky (KAZ)	Belgium	Liège
24 April	Presidential Cycling Tour of Turkey, Stage 3	UCI Europe Tour	Alexsandr Dyachenko (KAZ)	Turkey	Elmalı
29 April	Presidential Cycling Tour of Turkey, Overall	UCI Europe Tour	Alexsandr Dyachenko (KAZ)	Turkey	
29 April	Presidential Cycling Tour of Turkey, Teams classification	UCI Europe Tour	(Note: The riders on the squad were Alexander Vinokourov, Assan Bazayev, Alexsandr Dyachenko, Dmitriy Gruzdev, Jacopo Guarnieri, Valentin Iglinsky, Yevgeniy Nepomnyachshiy and Andrey Zeits)	Turkey	
12 May	Giro d'Italia, Stage 7	UCI World Tour	Paolo Tiralongo (ITA)	Italy	Rocca di Cambio
25 May	Giro d'Italia, Stage 19	UCI World Tour	Roman Kreuziger (CZE)	Italy	Alpe di Pampeago
14 June	Tour of Slovenia, Stage 1	UCI Europe Tour	Simone Ponzi (ITA)	Slovenia	Novo Mesto
15 June	Tour de Suisse, Stage 7	UCI World Tour	Fredrik Kessiakoff (SWE)	Switzerland	Gossau
17 June	Tour de Suisse, Stage 9	UCI World Tour	Tanel Kangert (EST)	Switzerland	Sörenberg
17 June	Tour de Suisse, Teams classification	UCI World Tour	(Note: The riders on the squad were Jacopo Guarnieri, Assan Bazayev, Tanel Kangert, Francesco Gavazzi, Dimitry Muravyev, Fredrik Kessiakoff, Robert Kišerlovski and Roman Kreuziger)	Switzerland	
17 June	Tour of Slovenia, Overall	UCI Europe Tour	Janez Brajkovič (SLO)	Slovenia	
29 August	Vuelta a España, Stage 11	UCI World Tour	Fredrik Kessiakoff (SWE)	Spain	Pontevedra
11 October	Tour of Beijing, Stage 3	UCI World Tour	Francesco Gavazzi (ITA)	China	Badaling Great Wall
26 October	Tour of Hainan, Stage 7	UCI Asia Tour	Dmitriy Gruzdev (KAZ)	China	Wuzhishan
28 October	Tour of Hainan, Overall	UCI Asia Tour	Dmitriy Gruzdev (KAZ)	China	
28 October	Tour of Hainan, Teams classification	UCI Asia Tour	(Note: The riders on the squad were Valentin Iglinsky, Dmitriy Gruzdev, Yevgeniy Nepomnyachshiy, Sergey Renev, Andrey Zeits and Alexsandr Dyachenko)	China	
