= 2012 Omega Pharma–Quick-Step season =

2012 Omega Pharma–Quick Step season
Manager	Patrick Lefevere
One-day victories	14
Stage race overall victories	8
Stage race stage victories	21 (Note: Levi Leipheimer gained a stage victory from the disqualification of Alberto Contador's results from the Tour de San Luis.)
Previous season • Next season

The 2012 season for Omega Pharma–Quick-Step began in January at the Tour Down Under. As a UCI ProTeam, they were automatically invited and obligated to send a squad to every event in the UCI World Tour.

At the end of the 2011 season, Omega Pharma parted company with co-sponsors Lotto after seven seasons together, and later rejoined the former Quick Step team; announcing a deal prior to their split with Lotto, in August.

== 2012 roster ==
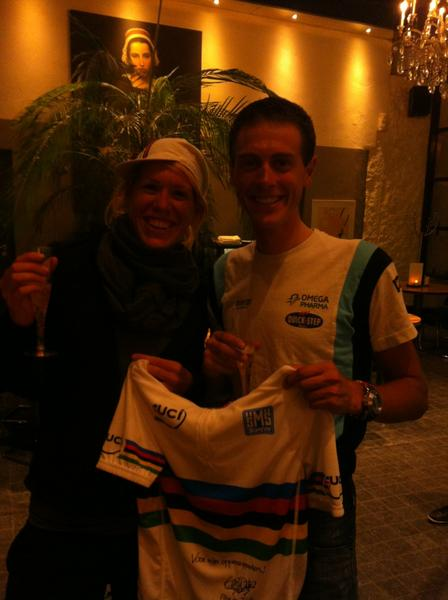
Niki Terpstra (with Ellen van Dijk), after winning the world title in the team time trial

Ages as of 1 January 2012.

Rider	Date of birth
Marco Bandiera (ITA)	12 June 1984 (aged 27)
Tom Boonen (BEL)	15 October 1980 (aged 31)
Matt Brammeier (IRL)	7 June 1985 (aged 26)
Dario Cataldo (ITA)	17 March 1985 (aged 26)
Sylvain Chavanel (FRA)	30 June 1979 (aged 32)
Francesco Chicchi (ITA)	27 November 1980 (aged 31)
Gerald Ciolek (GER)	16 September 1986 (aged 25)
Kevin de Weert (BEL)	27 May 1982 (aged 29)
Dries Devenyns (BEL)	22 July 1983 (aged 28)
Andrew Fenn (GBR)	1 July 1990 (aged 21)
Michał Gołaś (POL)	29 September 1984 (aged 27)
Bert Grabsch (GER)	19 June 1975 (aged 36)
Jeroen Hoorne (Note: Hoorne joined the team on 1 August, as a stagiaire, from the EFC-Omega Pharma-Quick Step team.) (BEL)	14 August 1988 (aged 23)
Iljo Keisse (BEL)	21 December 1982 (aged 29)
Michał Kwiatkowski (POL)	2 June 1990 (aged 21)
Levi Leipheimer (USA)	24 October 1973 (aged 38)

Rider	Date of birth
Nikolas Maes (BEL)	9 April 1986 (aged 25)
Tony Martin (GER)	23 April 1985 (aged 26)
Serge Pauwels (BEL)	23 November 1983 (aged 28)
Jérôme Pineau (FRA)	2 January 1980 (aged 31)
František Raboň (CZE)	26 September 1983 (aged 28)
Florian Sénéchal (Note: Sénéchal joined the team on 1 August, as a stagiaire, from the EFC-Omega Pharma-Quick Step team.) (FRA)	10 July 1993 (aged 18)
Gert Steegmans (BEL)	30 September 1980 (aged 31)
Zdeněk Štybar (CZE)	11 December 1985 (aged 26)
Niki Terpstra (NED)	18 May 1984 (aged 27)
Matteo Trentin (ITA)	2 August 1989 (aged 22)
Guillaume Van Keirsbulck (BEL)	14 February 1991 (aged 20)
Stijn Vandenbergh (BEL)	25 April 1984 (aged 27)
Kristof Vandewalle (BEL)	5 April 1985 (aged 26)
Martin Velits (SVK)	21 February 1985 (aged 26)
Peter Velits (SVK)	21 February 1985 (aged 26)
Julien Vermote (BEL)	26 July 1989 (aged 22)

Riders who joined the team for the 2012 season

Rider	2011 team
Martin Velits	HTC–Highroad
Peter Velits	HTC–Highroad
Stijn Vandenbergh	Team Katusha
Matteo Trentin	stagiaire (Quick-Step)
Andrew Fenn	An Post–Sean Kelly
Michał Gołaś	Vacansoleil–DCM
Michał Kwiatkowski	Team RadioShack
Levi Leipheimer	Team RadioShack
Tony Martin	HTC–Highroad
František Raboň	HTC–Highroad
Bert Grabsch	HTC–Highroad
Matt Brammeier	HTC–Highroad
Serge Pauwels	Team Sky

Riders who left the team during or after the 2011 season

Rider	2012 team
Marc de Maar	UnitedHealthcare
Kevin Seeldraeyers	Astana
Davide Malacarne	Team Europcar
Addy Engels	Retired to become Project 1t4i sports director
Fréderique Robert	Lotto–Belisol
Jan Tratnik	Radenska
Kevin van Impe	Vacansoleil–DCM
Francesco Reda	Acqua & Sapone
Andy Cappelle	Accent.jobs–Willems Veranda's
Andreas Stauff	Eddy Merckx–Indeland

== Season victories ==
Date	Race	Competition	Rider	Country	Location
23 January	Tour de San Luis, Stage 1	UCI America Tour	Francesco Chicchi (ITA)	Argentina	Villa Mercedes
24 January	Tour de San Luis, Stage 2	UCI America Tour	Francesco Chicchi (ITA)	Argentina	Juana Koslay
25 January	Tour de San Luis, Stage 3	UCI America Tour	Levi Leipheimer (USA)	Argentina	Mirador del Portero
26 January	Tour de San Luis, Stage 4	UCI America Tour	Levi Leipheimer (USA)	Argentina	San Luis
29 January	Tour de San Luis, Stage 7	UCI America Tour	Tom Boonen (BEL)	Argentina	San Luis
29 January	Tour de San Luis, Overall	UCI America Tour	Levi Leipheimer (USA)	Argentina	
5 February	Tour of Qatar, Stage 1	UCI Asia Tour	Tom Boonen (BEL)	Qatar	Doha
5 February	Trofeo Palma	UCI Europe Tour	Andrew Fenn (GBR)	Spain	Palma
6 February	Trofeo Migjorn	UCI Europe Tour	Andrew Fenn (GBR)	Spain	Campos
8 February	Tour of Qatar, Stage 4	UCI Asia Tour	Tom Boonen (BEL)	Qatar	Madinat ash Shamal
10 February	Tour of Qatar, Overall	UCI Asia Tour	Tom Boonen (BEL)	Qatar	
10 February	Tour of Qatar, Points classification	UCI Asia Tour	Tom Boonen (BEL)	Qatar	
10 February	Tour of Qatar, Teams classification	UCI Asia Tour	(Note: The riders on the squad were Tom Boonen, Matt Brammeier, Francesco Chicchi, Nikolas Maes, František Raboň, Gert Steegmans, Guillaume Van Keirsbulck and Stijn Vandenbergh)	Qatar	
18 February	Volta ao Algarve, Stage 4	UCI Europe Tour	Gerald Ciolek (GER)	Portugal	Tavira
19 February	Tour of Oman, Overall	UCI Asia Tour	Peter Velits (SVK)	Oman	
2 March	Driedaagse van West-Vlaanderen, Prologue	UCI Europe Tour	Michał Kwiatkowski (POL)	Belgium	Middelkerke
3 March	Driedaagse van West-Vlaanderen, Stage 1	UCI Europe Tour	Francesco Chicchi (ITA)	Belgium	Bellegem
4 March	Driedaagse van West-Vlaanderen, Overall	UCI Europe Tour	Julien Vermote (BEL)	Belgium	
4 March	Driedaagse van West-Vlaanderen, Young rider classification	UCI Europe Tour	Julien Vermote (BEL)	Belgium	
5 March	Paris–Nice, Stage 2	UCI World Tour	Tom Boonen (BEL)	France	Orléans
14 March	Nokere Koerse	UCI Europe Tour	Francesco Chicchi (ITA)	Belgium	Nokere
16 March	Handzame Classic	UCI Europe Tour	Francesco Chicchi (ITA)	Belgium	Handzame
21 March	Dwars door Vlaanderen	UCI Europe Tour	Niki Terpstra (NED)	Belgium	Waregem
23 March	E3 Harelbeke	UCI World Tour	Tom Boonen (BEL)	Belgium	Harelbeke
25 March	Gent–Wevelgem	UCI World Tour	Tom Boonen (BEL)	Belgium	Wevelgem
29 March	Three Days of De Panne, Stage 3b	UCI Europe Tour	Sylvain Chavanel (FRA)	Belgium	De Panne
29 March	Three Days of De Panne, Overall	UCI Europe Tour	Sylvain Chavanel (FRA)	Belgium	
29 March	Three Days of De Panne, Teams classification	UCI Europe Tour	(Note: The riders on the squad were Sylvain Chavanel, Francesco Chicchi, Niki Terpstra, Guillaume Van Keirsbulck, Michał Kwiatkowski, Dries Devenyns, Andrew Fenn and Iljo Keisse)	Belgium	
1 April	Tour of Flanders	UCI World Tour	Tom Boonen (BEL)	Belgium	Oudenaarde
8 April	Paris–Roubaix	UCI World Tour	Tom Boonen (BEL)	France	Roubaix
28 April	Presidential Cycling Tour of Turkey, Stage 7	UCI Europe Tour	Iljo Keisse (BEL)	Turkey	İzmir
29 April	Presidential Cycling Tour of Turkey, Mountains classification	UCI Europe Tour	Marco Bandiera (ITA)	Turkey	
7 May	Four Days of Dunkirk, Stage 4	UCI Europe Tour	Zdeněk Štybar (CZE)	France	Cassel
26 May	Tour of Belgium, Stage 4	UCI Europe Tour	Tony Martin (GER)	Belgium	Arendonk
27 May	Giro d'Italia, Fair Play Teams classification	UCI World Tour	(Note: The riders on the squad were Dario Cataldo, Marco Bandiera, Francesco Chicchi, Michał Gołaś, Nikolas Maes, Serge Pauwels, Michał Kwiatkowski, Martin Velits and Julien Vermote)	Italy	
27 May	Tour of Belgium, Overall	UCI Europe Tour	Tony Martin (GER)	Belgium	
29 May	Gullegem Koerse	National event	Matteo Trentin (ITA)	Belgium	Gullegem
12 July	Tour de Pologne, Stage 3	UCI World Tour	Zdeněk Štybar (CZE)	Poland	Cieszyn
8 August	Tour de l'Ain, Stage 2b	UCI Europe Tour	Team time trial (Note: The riders on the squad were Dario Cataldo, Gerald Ciolek, Andrew Fenn, Serge Pauwels, František Raboň, Kristof Vandewalle, and Nikolas Maes)	France	Saint-Vulbas
12 August	Eneco Tour, Teams classification	UCI World Tour	(Note: The riders on the squad were Tom Boonen, Michał Kwiatkowski, Sylvain Chavanel, Gert Steegmans, Niki Terpstra, Guillaume Van Keirsbulck, Stijn Vandenbergh and Dries Devenyns)	(Note: Race held in Belgium and the Netherlands.)	
12 August	Tour of Utah, Stage 6	UCI America Tour	Levi Leipheimer (USA)	United States	Park City
31 August	World Ports Classic, Stage 1	UCI Europe Tour	Tom Boonen (BEL)	Belgium	Antwerp
1 September	World Ports Classic, Overall	UCI Europe Tour	Tom Boonen (BEL)		
1 September	World Ports Classic, Points classification	UCI Europe Tour	Tom Boonen (BEL)		
3 September	Vuelta a España, Stage 16	UCI World Tour	Dario Cataldo (ITA)	Spain	Valgrande-Pajares–Cuitu Negru
8 September	Paris–Brussels	UCI Europe Tour	Tom Boonen (BEL)	Belgium	Brussels
16 September	UCI Road World Championships, Team time trial	UCI World Tour	(Note: The riders on the squad were Tom Boonen, Sylvain Chavanel, Tony Martin, Niki Terpstra, Kristof Vandewalle and Peter Velits)	Netherlands	Valkenburg
30 September	Tour de l'Eurometropole, Young rider classification	UCI Europe Tour	Guillaume Van Keirsbulck (BEL)	Belgium	
10 October	Tour of Beijing, Stage 2	UCI World Tour	Tony Martin (GER)	China	MenTouGou
13 October	Tour of Beijing, Overall	UCI World Tour	Tony Martin (GER)	China	
21 October	Chrono des Nations	UCI Europe Tour	Tony Martin (GER)	France	Les Herbiers
3 November	Amstel Curaçao Race	National event	Niki Terpstra (NED)	Curaçao	Willemstad
