= 2012 FDJ–BigMat season =

FDJ–BigMat
- 2012 season
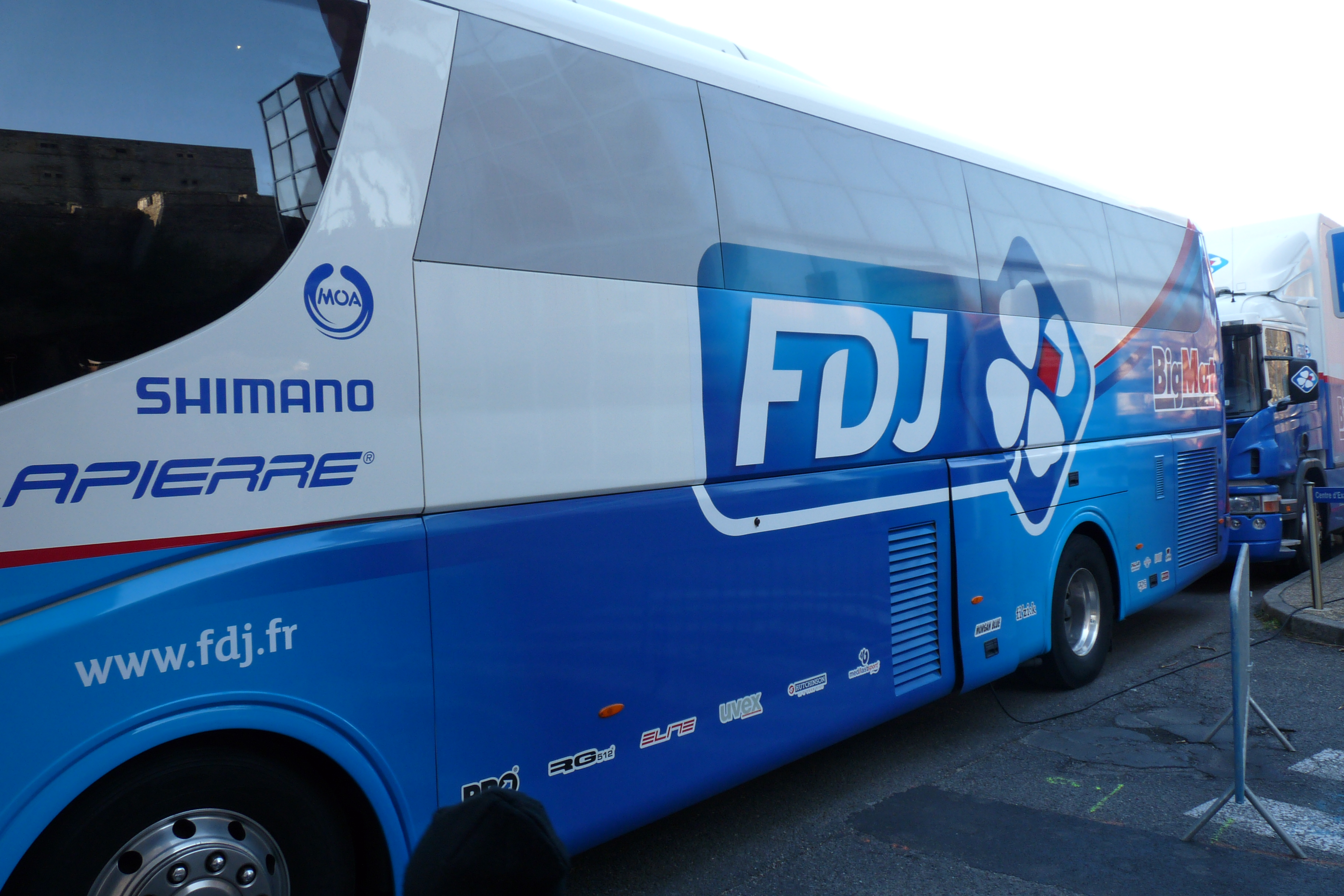
- The team bus at the 2012 Étoile de Bessèges
- UCI code: FDJ
- Status: UCI ProTeam
- World Tour Rank: 18th (246 points)
- Manager: Marc Madiot
- Main sponsor(s): Française des Jeux & BigMat
- Based: France
- Bicycles: Lapierre
- Groupset: Shimano

Season victories
- One-day races: 5
- Stage race overall: 1
- Stage race stages: 16
- National Championships: 2
- Most wins: Arnaud Démare (6 wins)
- Best ranked rider: Thibaut Pinot (60th)

The 2012 season for FDJ–BigMat began in January at the Tour Down Under. As a UCI ProTeam, the team were automatically invited and obligated to send a squad to every event in the UCI World Tour.

After a season at Professional Continental level in 2011, FDJ were promoted back to the top tier for the 2012 season, taking one of the two vacant licences that had been made available following the conclusion of the 2011 season. Also prior to the season, French building merchants BigMat joined the team as co-sponsors, contributing €2 million to the team.

== 2012 roster ==
Ages as of 1 January 2012.

Rider	Date of birth
Sébastien Bergeret (Note: Bergeret joined the team on 1 August, as a stagiaire, from VC Toucy.) (FRA)	22 January 1992 (aged 19)
William Bonnet (FRA)	25 June 1982 (aged 29)
David Boucher (FRA)	17 March 1980 (aged 31)
Nacer Bouhanni (FRA)	25 July 1990 (aged 21)
Sandy Casar (FRA)	2 February 1979 (aged 32)
Steve Chainel (FRA)	6 September 1983 (aged 28)
Arnaud Courteille (FRA)	13 March 1989 (aged 22)
Mickaël Delage (FRA)	6 August 1985 (aged 26)
Arnaud Démare (FRA)	26 August 1991 (aged 20)
Kenny Elissonde (FRA)	22 July 1991 (aged 20)
Pierrick Fédrigo (FRA)	30 November 1978 (aged 33)
Arnaud Gérard (FRA)	6 October 1984 (aged 27)
Anthony Geslin (FRA)	9 June 1980 (aged 31)
Frédéric Guesdon (Note: Guesdon retired from the sport on 8 April, after completing Paris–Roubaix.) (FRA)	14 October 1971 (aged 40)
Yauheni Hutarovich (BLR)	29 November 1983 (aged 28)
Arnold Jeannesson (FRA)	15 January 1986 (aged 25)

Rider	Date of birth
Mathieu Ladagnous (FRA)	12 December 1984 (aged 27)
Francis Mourey (FRA)	8 December 1980 (aged 31)
Yoann Offredo (FRA)	12 November 1986 (aged 25)
Rémi Pauriol (FRA)	4 April 1982 (aged 29)
Cédric Pineau (FRA)	8 May 1985 (aged 26)
Thibaut Pinot (FRA)	29 May 1990 (aged 21)
Gabriel Rasch (NOR)	8 April 1976 (aged 35)
Dominique Rollin (CAN)	29 October 1982 (aged 29)
Anthony Roux (FRA)	18 April 1987 (aged 24)
Jérémy Roy (FRA)	22 June 1983 (aged 28)
Eduardo Sepúlveda (Note: Sepulveda joined the team on 1 August, as a stagiaire, from the Centre Mondial du Cyclisme.) (ARG)	13 June 1991 (aged 20)
Geoffrey Soupe (FRA)	22 March 1988 (aged 23)
Benoît Vaugrenard (FRA)	5 January 1982 (aged 29)
Jussi Veikkanen (FIN)	29 March 1981 (aged 30)
Arthur Vichot (FRA)	26 November 1988 (aged 23)
Emilien Viennet (Note: Viennet joined the team on 1 August, as a stagiaire, from CC Etupes.) (FRA)	6 February 1992 (aged 19)

Riders who joined the team for the 2012 season

Rider	2011 team
Arnaud Démare	neo-pro (stagiaire: FDJ)
Kenny Elissonde	neo-pro (stagiaire: FDJ)
David Boucher	Omega Pharma–Lotto
Gabriel Rasch	Garmin–Cervélo
Jussi Veikkanen	Omega Pharma–Lotto

Riders who left the team during or after the 2011 season

Rider	2012 team
Gianni Meersman	Lotto–Belisol
Wesley Sulzberger	GreenEDGE
Olivier Bonnaire	None

== Season victories ==
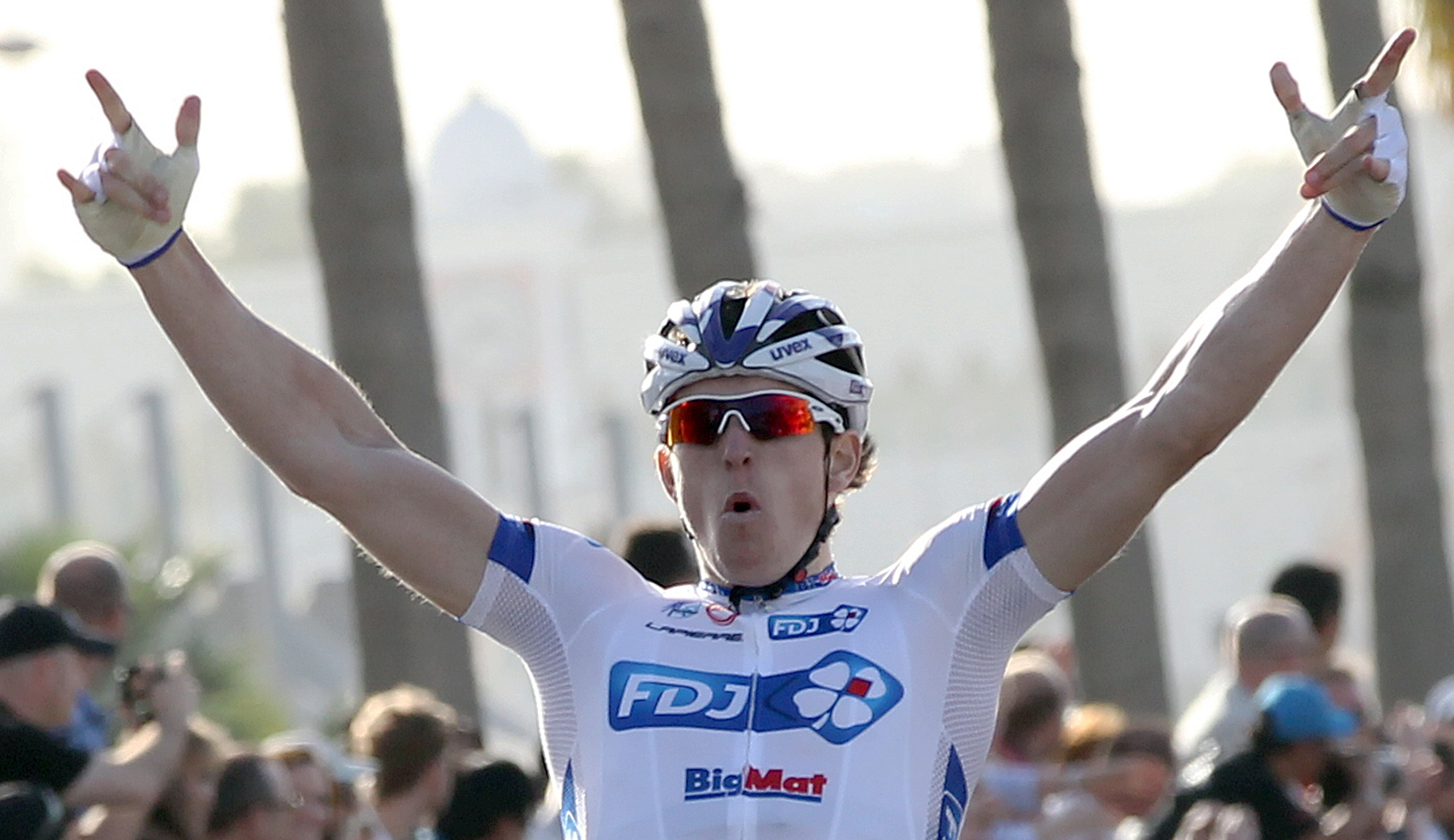
Arnaud Démare wins the final stage of the 2012 Tour of Qatar.

Yauheni Hutarovich won the National Road Race Championship of Belarus, and Nacer Bouhanni won the French National Road Race Championships on 24 June.

Date	Race	Competition	Rider	Country	Location	Ref
1 February	Étoile de Bessèges, Stage 1	UCI Europe Tour	Nacer Bouhanni (FRA)	France	Bellegarde	
10 February	Tour of Qatar, Stage 6	UCI Asia Tour	Arnaud Démare (FRA)	Qatar	Doha	
26 February	Les Boucles du Sud Ardèche	UCI Europe Tour	Rémi Pauriol (FRA)	France	Ruoms	
29 February	Le Samyn	UCI Europe Tour	Arnaud Démare (FRA)	Belgium	Dour	
4 March	Driedaagse van West-Vlaanderen, Stage 2	UCI Europe Tour	Arnaud Démare (FRA)	Belgium	Ichtegem	
4 March	Driedaagse van West-Vlaanderen, Points classification	UCI Europe Tour	Arnaud Démare (FRA)	Belgium		
18 March	Cholet-Pays de Loire	UCI Europe Tour	Arnaud Démare (FRA)	France	Cholet	
25 March	Critérium International, Stage 3	UCI Europe Tour	Pierrick Fédrigo (FRA)	France	Col de l'Ospedale	
6 April	Circuit de la Sarthe, Mountains classification	UCI Europe Tour	Arnaud Courteille (FRA)	France		
16 May	Circuit de Lorraine, Stage 1	UCI Europe Tour	Nacer Bouhanni (FRA)	France	Neuves-Maisons	
20 May	Circuit de Lorraine, Overall	UCI Europe Tour	Nacer Bouhanni (FRA)	France		
20 May	Circuit de Lorraine, Points classification	UCI Europe Tour	Nacer Bouhanni (FRA)	France		
20 May	Circuit de Lorraine, Young rider classification	UCI Europe Tour	Nacer Bouhanni (FRA)	France		
8 June	Critérium du Dauphiné, Stage 5	UCI World Tour	Arthur Vichot (FRA)	France	Rumilly	
15 June	Route du Sud, Stage 2	UCI Europe Tour	Arnaud Démare (FRA)	France	Saint-Michel	
20 June	Halle–Ingooigem	UCI Europe Tour	Nacer Bouhanni (FRA)	Belgium	Ingooigem	
8 July	Tour de France, Stage 8	UCI World Tour	Thibaut Pinot (FRA)	Switzerland	Porrentruy	
16 July	Tour de France, Stage 15	UCI World Tour	Pierrick Fédrigo (FRA)	France	Pau	
21 July	Tour de Wallonie, Stage 1	UCI Europe Tour	Nacer Bouhanni (FRA)	Belgium	Lessines	
2 August	Paris–Corrèze, Stage 2	UCI Europe Tour	Kenny Elissonde (FRA)	France	Chaumeil	
2 August	Paris–Corrèze, Points classification	UCI Europe Tour	Kenny Elissonde (FRA)	France		
7 August	Tour de l'Ain, Stage 1	UCI Europe Tour	Yauheni Hutarovich (BLR)	France	Trévoux	
8 August	Tour de l'Ain, Stage 2a	UCI Europe Tour	Yauheni Hutarovich (BLR)	France	Lagnieu	
11 August	Tour de l'Ain, Stage 5	UCI Europe Tour	Thibaut Pinot (FRA)	France	Lélex–Monts Jura	
17 August	Tour du Limousin, Stage 4	UCI Europe Tour	Jérémy Roy (FRA)	France	Limoges	
17 August	Tour du Limousin, Teams classification	UCI Europe Tour	(Note: The riders on the squad were Arnaud Gérard, Anthony Geslin, Francis Mourey, Jérémy Roy, Anthony Roux, Sébastien Bergeret and Eduardo Sepúlveda)	France		
19 August	Vattenfall Cyclassics	UCI World Tour	Arnaud Démare (FRA)	Germany	Hamburg	
30 September	Tour de l'Eurometropole, Stage 4	UCI Europe Tour	Nacer Bouhanni (FRA)	Belgium	Tournai	

== Footnotes ==
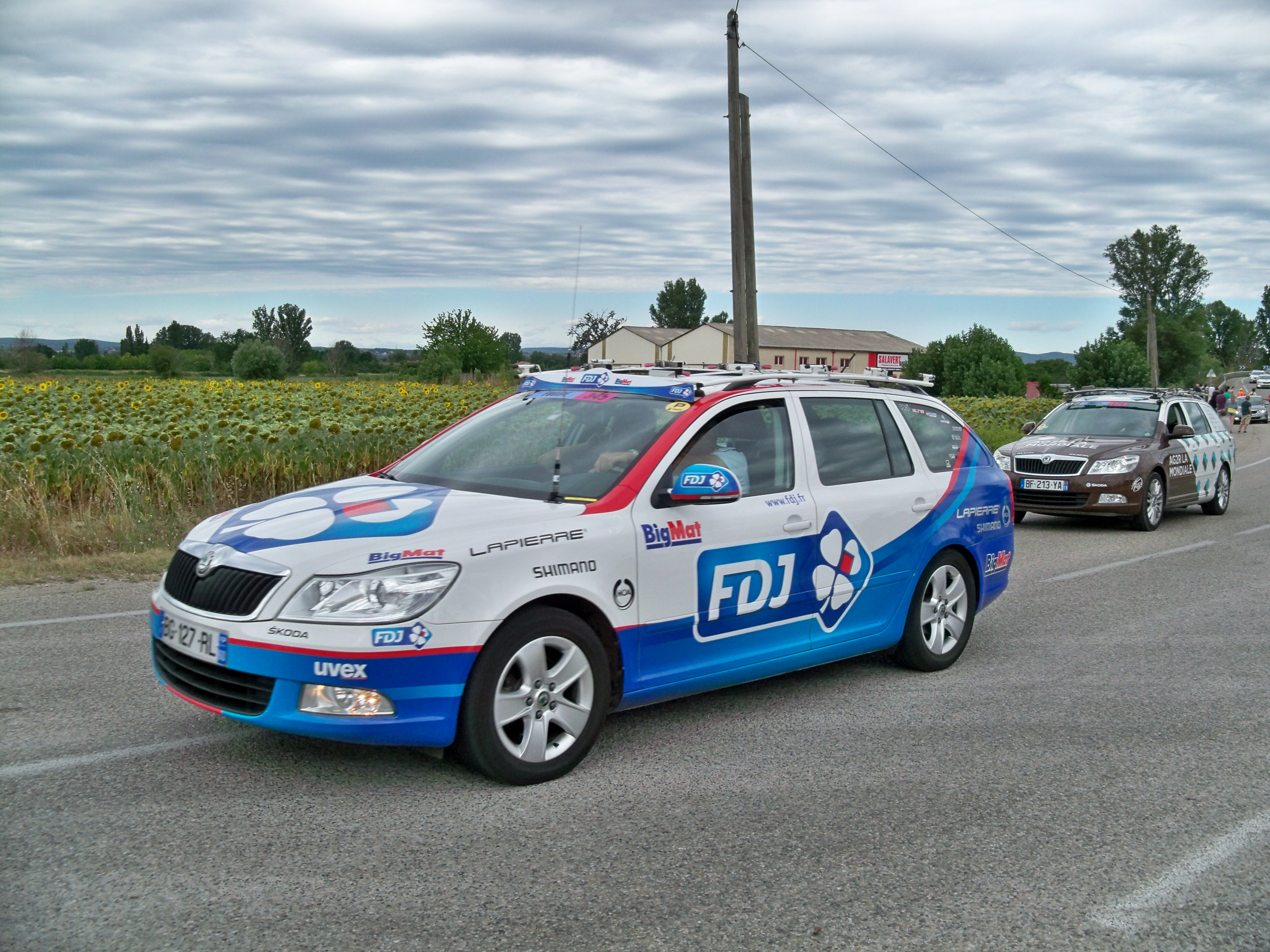
The team car at the 2012 Tour de France
