= Vanendert =

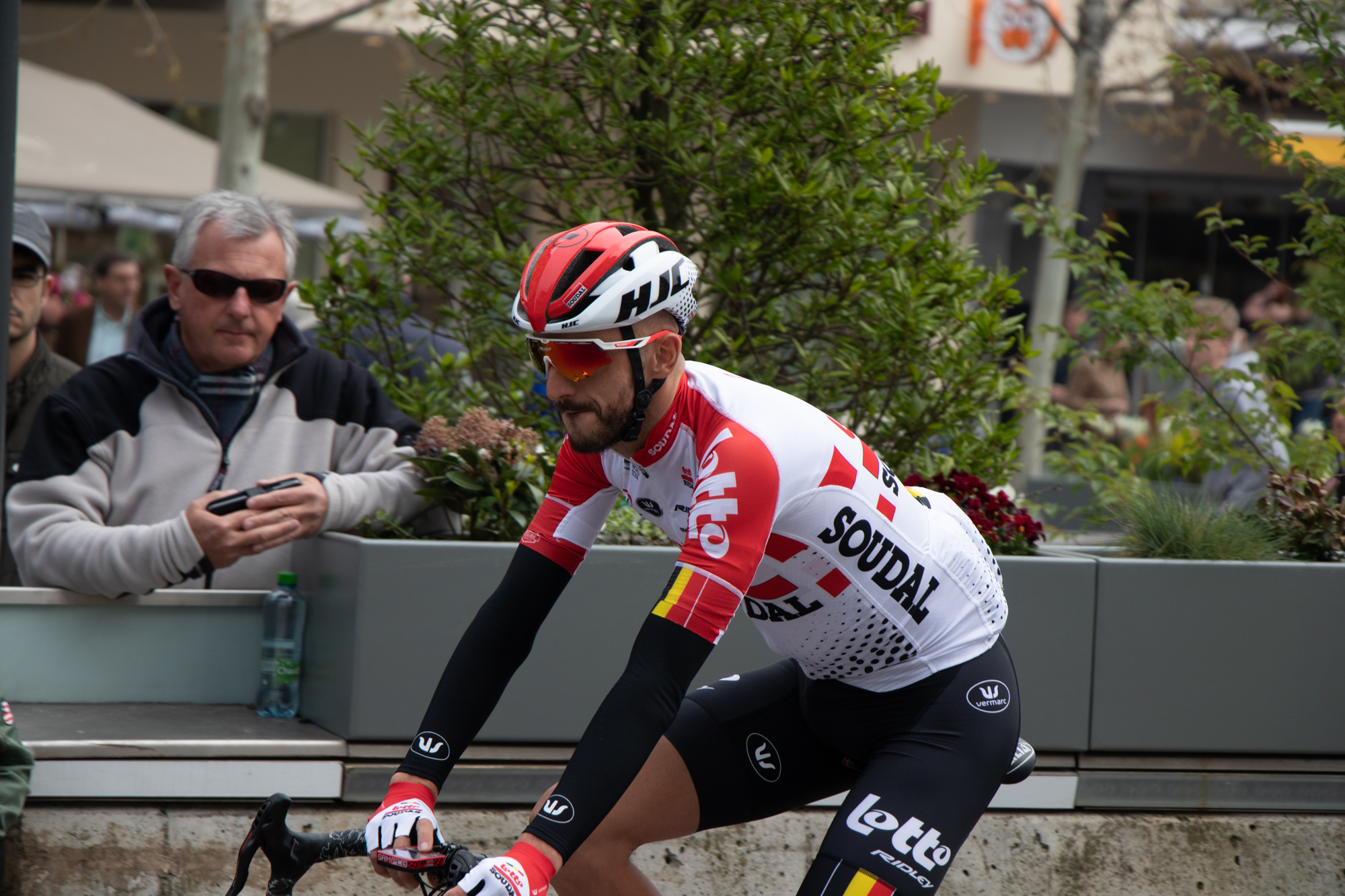
Jelle Vanendert, Belgian cyclist

Vanendert is a surname. Notable people with the surname include:

- Dennis Vanendert (born 1988), Belgian cyclist
- Jelle Vanendert (born 1985), Belgian cyclist
