= 2012 UCI World Tour =

Road cycling competitions

- Second edition of the UCI World Tour

Details
- Dates: 17 January – 13 October
- Location: Europe, Canada, Australia and China
- Races: 29

Champions
- Individual champion: Joaquim Rodríguez (Team Katusha)
- Teams' champion: Team Sky
- Nations' champion: Spain

The 2012 UCI World Tour was the fourth edition of the ranking system launched by the Union Cycliste Internationale (UCI) in 2009. The series started with the Tour Down Under's opening stage on 17 January, and consisted of 14 stage races, 14 one-day races, and one team time trial (which only counted towards the team rankings). The Tour of Hangzhou which was originally included in the list of races was postponed until 2013.

== Teams ==
The 18 UCI ProTeams competed in the World Tour, with UCI Professional Continental teams, or national squads, able to enter at the discretion of the organisers of each event. The ProTeams, which were obliged to take part in all 29 events, were:

2012 UCI Pro Teams and equipment
Code	Official team name	License holder	Country	Groupset	Bicycles
ALM	Ag2r–La Mondiale (2012 season)	EUSRL France Cyclisme	France	SRAM	Focus
AST	Astana (2012 season)	Olympus Sarl	Kazakhstan	Campagnolo	Specialized
BMC	BMC Racing Team (2012 season)	Continuum Sports LLC	United States	Shimano	BMC
EUS	Euskaltel–Euskadi (2012 season)	Fundación Ciclista Euskadi	Spain	Shimano	Orbea
FDJ	FDJ–BigMat (2012 season)	Société de Gestion de L'Echappée	France	Shimano	Lapierre
GRM	Garmin–Sharp (2012 season)	Slipstream Sports, LLC	United States	Shimano	Cervélo
OGE	Orica–GreenEDGE (2012 season)	Lachlan Smith	Australia	Shimano	Scott
LAM	Lampre–ISD (2012 season)	Total Cycling Limited	Italy	Shimano	Merida
CAN	Liquigas–Cannondale (2012 season)	Brixia Sports	Italy	SRAM	Cannondale
LTB	Lotto–Belisol (2012 season)	Belgian Cycling Company sa	Belgium	Campagnolo	Ridley
MOV	Movistar Team (2012 season)	Abarca Sports S.L.	Spain	Campagnolo	Pinarello
OPQ	Omega Pharma–Quick-Step (2012 season)	Esperanza bvba	Belgium	SRAM	Specialized
RAB	Rabobank (2012 season)	Rabo Wielerploegen	Netherlands	Shimano	Giant
KAT	Team Katusha (2012 season)	Katusha Management SA	Russia	Shimano	Canyon
RNT	RadioShack–Nissan (2012 season)	Leopard SA	Luxembourg	Shimano	Trek
SAX	Saxo Bank–Tinkoff Bank (2012 season)	Riis Cycling A/S	Denmark	SRAM	Specialized
SKY	Team Sky (2012 season)	Tour Racing Limited	United Kingdom	Shimano	Pinarello
VCD	Vacansoleil–DCM (2012 season)	STL–Pro Cycling B.V.	Netherlands	Shimano	Bianchi

GreenEDGE (known as Orica–GreenEDGE from May onwards) was a new team, while FDJ–BigMat regained ProTour status, which it lost for the previous season. These teams replaced HTC–Highroad, which folded after 21 years, and Team RadioShack, which largely merged with Leopard Trek to form RadioShack–Nissan. A change in sponsorship saw Quick-Step become Omega Pharma–Quick-Step, while 2011's Omega Pharma–Lotto became Lotto–Belisol. Two teams each changed their names twice to reflect changes of sponsorship: Team Saxo Bank reverting to its previous name, having been known as Saxo Bank–SunGard in 2011, before becoming Saxo Bank–Tinkoff Bank in June; while the serial addition of new sponsors gave rise to the names Garmin–Barracuda and Garmin–Sharp.

== Events ==
All 27 events from the 2011 UCI World Tour were included, and E3 Harelbeke, a one-day race in Belgium, and the World Team Trial Championships, were added.

Race	Date	Winner		Second		Third		Other points (4th place onwards)	Stage points
(Australia) Tour Down Under	January 17–22	Simon Gerrans (AUS)	100 pts	Alejandro Valverde (ESP)	80 pts	Tiago Machado (POR)	70 pts	60, 50, 40, 30, 20, 10, 4	6, 4, 2, 1, 1
(France) Paris–Nice	March 4–11	Bradley Wiggins (GBR)	100 pts	Lieuwe Westra (NED)	80 pts	Alejandro Valverde (ESP)	70 pts	60, 50, 40, 30, 20, 10, 4	6, 4, 2, 1, 1
(Italy) Tirreno–Adriatico	March 7–13	Vincenzo Nibali (ITA)	100 pts	Chris Horner (USA)	80 pts	Roman Kreuziger (CZE)	70 pts	60, 50, 40, 30, 20, 10, 4	6, 4, 2, 1, 1
(Italy) Milan–San Remo	March 17	Simon Gerrans (AUS)	100 pts	Fabian Cancellara (SWI)	80 pts	Vincenzo Nibali (ITA)	70 pts	60, 50, 40, 30, 20, 10, 4	N/A
(Spain) Volta a Catalunya	March 19–25	Michael Albasini (SWI)	100 pts	Samuel Sánchez (ESP)	80 pts	Jurgen Van den Broeck (BEL)	70 pts	60, 50, 40, 30, 20, 10, 4	6, 4, 2, 1, 1
(Belgium) E3 Harelbeke	March 23	Tom Boonen (BEL)	80 pts	Óscar Freire (ESP)	60 pts	Bernhard Eisel (AUT)	50 pts	40, 30, 22, 14, 10, 6, 2	N/A
(Belgium) Gent–Wevelgem	March 25	Tom Boonen (BEL)	80 pts	Peter Sagan (SVK)	60 pts	Matti Breschel (DEN)	50 pts	40, 30, 22, 14, 10, 6, 2	N/A
(Belgium) Tour of Flanders	April 1	Tom Boonen (BEL)	100 pts	Filippo Pozzato (ITA)	0 pts	Alessandro Ballan (ITA)	70 pts	60, 50, 40, 30, 20, 10, 4	N/A
(Spain) Tour of the Basque Country	April 2–7	Samuel Sánchez (ESP)	100 pts	Joaquim Rodríguez (ESP)	80 pts	Bauke Mollema (NED)	70 pts	60, 50, 40, 30, 20, 10, 4	6, 4, 2, 1, 1
(France) Paris–Roubaix	April 8	Tom Boonen (BEL)	100 pts	Sébastien Turgot (FRA)	0 pts	Alessandro Ballan (ITA)	70 pts	60, 50, 40, 30, 20, 10, 4	N/A
(Netherlands) Amstel Gold Race	April 15	Enrico Gasparotto (ITA)	80 pts	Jelle Vanendert (BEL)	60 pts	Peter Sagan (SVK)	50 pts	40, 30, 22, 14, 10, 6, 2	N/A
(Belgium) La Flèche Wallonne	April 18	Joaquim Rodríguez (ESP)	80 pts	Michael Albasini (SWI)	60 pts	Philippe Gilbert (BEL)	50 pts	40, 30, 22, 14, 10, 6, 2	N/A
(Belgium) Liège–Bastogne–Liège	April 22	Maxim Iglinsky (KAZ)	100 pts	Vincenzo Nibali (ITA)	80 pts	Enrico Gasparotto (ITA)	70 pts	60, 50, 40, 30, 20, 10, 4	N/A
(Switzerland) Tour de Romandie	April 24–29	Bradley Wiggins (GBR)	100 pts	Andrew Talansky (USA)	80 pts	Rui Costa (POR)	70 pts	60, 50, 40, 30, 20, 10, 4	6, 4, 2, 1, 1
(Italy) Giro d'Italia	May 5–27	Ryder Hesjedal (CAN)	170 pts	Joaquim Rodríguez (ESP)	130 pts	Thomas De Gendt (BEL)	100 pts	90, 80, 70, 60, 52, 44, 38, 32, 26, 22, 18, 14, 10, 8, 6, 4, 2	16, 8, 4, 2, 1
(France) Critérium du Dauphiné	June 3–10	Bradley Wiggins (GBR)	100 pts	Michael Rogers (AUS)	80 pts	Cadel Evans (AUS)	70 pts	60, 50, 40, 30, 20, 10, 4	6, 4, 2, 1, 1
(Switzerland) Tour de Suisse	June 9–17	Rui Costa (POR)	100 pts	Fränk Schleck (LUX)	80 pts	Levi Leipheimer (USA)	70 pts	60, 50, 40, 30, 20, 10, 4	6, 4, 2, 1, 1
Tour de France	June 30 – July 22	Bradley Wiggins (GBR)	200 pts	Chris Froome (GBR)	150 pts	Vincenzo Nibali (ITA)	120 pts	110, 100, 90, 80, 70, 60, 50, 40, 30, 24, 20, 16, 12, 10, 8, 6, 4	20, 10, 6, 4, 2
(Poland) Tour de Pologne	July 10–16	Moreno Moser (ITA)	100 pts	Michał Kwiatkowski (POL)	80 pts	Sergio Henao (COL)	70 pts	60, 50, 40, 30, 20, 10, 4	6, 4, 2, 1, 1
(Belgium) (Netherlands) Eneco Tour	August 6–12	Lars Boom (NED)	100 pts	Sylvain Chavanel (FRA)	80 pts	Niki Terpstra (NED)	70 pts	60, 50, 40, 30, 20, 10, 4	6, 4, 2, 1, 1
(Spain) Clásica de San Sebastián	August 14	Luis León Sánchez (ESP)	80 pts	Simon Gerrans (AUS)	60 pts	Gianni Meersman (BEL)	50 pts	40, 30, 22, 14, 10, 6, 2	N/A
(Spain) Vuelta a España	August 18 – September 9	Alberto Contador (ESP)	170 pts	Alejandro Valverde (ESP)	130 pts	Joaquim Rodríguez (ESP)	100 pts	90, 80, 70, 60, 52, 44, 38, 32, 26, 22, 18, 14, 10, 8, 6, 4, 2	16, 8, 4, 2, 1
(Germany) Vattenfall Cyclassics	August 19	Arnaud Démare (FRA)	80 pts	André Greipel (GER)	60 pts	Giacomo Nizzolo (ITA)	50 pts	40, 30, 22, 14, 10, 6, 2	N/A
GP Ouest-France	August 26	Edvald Boasson Hagen (NOR)	80 pts	Rui Costa (POR)	60 pts	Heinrich Haussler (AUS)	50 pts	40, 30, 22, 14, 10, 6, 2	N/A
(Canada) GP de Québec	September 7	Simon Gerrans (AUS)	80 pts	Greg Van Avermaet (BEL)	60 pts	Rui Costa (POR)	50 pts	40, 30, 22, 14, 10, 6, 2	N/A
(Canada) GP de Montréal	September 9	Lars Petter Nordhaug (NOR)	80 pts	Moreno Moser (ITA)	60 pts	Alexandr Kolobnev (RUS)	50 pts	40, 30, 22, 14, 10, 6, 2	N/A
(Netherlands) TTT at World Championships†	September 16	Omega Pharma–Quick-Step	200 pts	BMC Racing Team	170 pts	Orica–GreenEDGE	140 pts	130, 120, 110, 100, 90, 80, 70	N/A
(Italy) Giro di Lombardia	September 29	Joaquim Rodríguez (ESP)	100 pts	Samuel Sánchez (ESP)	80 pts	Rigoberto Urán (COL)	70 pts	60, 50, 40, 30, 20, 10, 4	N/A
(China) Tour of Beijing	October 9–13	Tony Martin (GER)	100 pts	Francesco Gavazzi (ITA)	80 pts	Edvald Boasson Hagen (NOR)	70 pts	60, 50, 40, 30, 20, 10, 4	6, 4, 2, 1, 1

† The World Team Time Trial Championship gives points only in the team rankings, not in the individual or national standings.

== Final standings ==
=== Individual ===
Riders tied with the same number of points were classified by number of victories, then number of second places, third places, and so on, in World Tour events and stages.

Rank	Name	Team	Points
1	Joaquim Rodríguez (ESP)	Team Katusha	692
2	Bradley Wiggins (GBR)	Team Sky	601
3	Tom Boonen (BEL)	Omega Pharma–Quick-Step	410
4	Vincenzo Nibali (ITA)	Liquigas–Cannondale	400
5	Alejandro Valverde (ESP)	Movistar Team	394
6	Simon Gerrans (AUS)	Orica–GreenEDGE	390
7	Chris Froome (GBR)	Team Sky	376
8	Peter Sagan (SVK)	Liquigas–Cannondale	351
9	Samuel Sánchez (ESP)	Euskaltel–Euskadi	332
10	Rui Costa (POR)	Movistar Team	320
11	Edvald Boasson Hagen (NOR)	Team Sky	317
12	Alberto Contador (ESP)	Saxo Bank–Tinkoff Bank	290
13	Ryder Hesjedal (CAN)	Garmin–Sharp	241
14	Jurgen Van den Broeck (BEL)	Lotto–Belisol	237
15	Rigoberto Urán (COL)	Team Sky	199
16	Dan Martin (IRL)	Garmin–Sharp	196
17	Michael Rogers (AUS)	Team Sky	194
18	Bauke Mollema (NED)	Rabobank	194
19	Sergio Henao (COL)	Team Sky	194
20	Roman Kreuziger (CZE)	Astana	189
21	Damiano Cunego (ITA)	Lampre–ISD	184
22	Michele Scarponi (ITA)	Lampre–ISD	184
23	Michael Albasini (SUI)	Orica–GreenEDGE	183
24	Cadel Evans (AUS)	BMC Racing Team	182
25	Óscar Freire (ESP)	Team Katusha	181

- 248 riders scored points. 40 other riders finished in positions that would have earned them points, but they were ineligible as members of non-ProTour teams.

=== Team ===
Team rankings were calculated by adding the ranking points of the top five riders of a team in the table, plus points gained in the World Team Time Trial Championship (WTTT).

Rank	Team	Points	Top 5 riders	WTTT
1	Team Sky	1767	Wiggins (601), Froome (376), Boasson Hagen (317), Urán (199), Rogers (194)	80
2	Team Katusha	1273	Rodríguez (692), Freire (181), Kolobnev (110), D. Moreno (104), Špilak (86)	100
3	Liquigas–Cannondale	1197	Nibali (400), P. Sagan (351), Moser (175), Basso (88), Capecchi (53)	130
4	Omega Pharma–Quick-Step	1162	Boonen (410), T. Martin (171), Terpstra (160), Chavanel (113), Kwiatkowski (108)	200
5	Movistar Team	952	Valverde (394), Costa (320), Intxausti (47), Kiryienka (41), Castroviejo (40)	110
6	Orica–GreenEDGE	920	Gerrans (390), Albasini (183), Goss (114), Durbridge (56), Tuft (37)	140
7	BMC Racing Team	917	Evans (182), Ballan (172), van Garderen (160), Van Avermaet (121), Gilbert (112)	170
8	Rabobank	799	Mollema (194), Boom (148), L. L. Sánchez (143), Gesink (134), Breschel (60)	120
9	Garmin–Sharp	762	Hesjedal (241), D. Martin (196), Talansky (145), Haussler (70), Le Mével (40)	70
10	Astana	645	Kreuziger (189), Gasparotto (150), Brajkovič (106), Iglinsky (100), Gavazzi (100)	0
11	Lotto–Belisol	625	Van Den Broeck (237), Greipel (162), J. Vanendert (104), Meersman (70), Roelandts (52)	0
12	RadioShack–Nissan	619	Cancellara (134), Horner (120), Zubeldia (94), Machado (92), F. Schleck (89)	90
13	Euskaltel–Euskadi	555	S. Sánchez (332), Nieve (98), J. Izagirre (46), Antón (44), Verdugo (35)	0
14	Lampre–ISD	435	Cunego (184), Scarponi (184), Ulissi (30), Petacchi (22), Niemiec (15)	0
15	Saxo Bank–Tinkoff Bank	401	Contador (290), Majka (30), Tosatto (30), C. A. Sørensen (30), J. J. Haedo (21)	0
16	Vacansoleil–DCM	364	De Gendt (134), Westra (97), Hoogerland (51), Marczyński (45), Marcato (37)	0
17	Ag2r–La Mondiale	315	Nocentini (162), Roche (63), Péraud (42), Gadret (33), Belletti (15)	0
18	FDJ–BigMat	246	Démare (87), Pinot (85), Jeannesson (40), Fédrigo (20), Ladagnous (14)	0

=== Nation ===
National rankings were calculated by adding the ranking points of the top five riders registered in a nation in the table. The national rankings as of the 21st event, Clásica de San Sebastián, were used to determine how many riders a country could have in the World Championships.

Rank	Nation	Points	Top five riders
1	Spain	1889	Rodríguez (692), Valverde (394), S. Sánchez (332), Contador (290), Freire (181)
2	Great Britain	1163	Wiggins (601), Froome (376), Cavendish (128), Swift (36), Thomas (22)
3	Italy	1115	Nibali (400), Cunego (184), Scarponi (184), Moser (175), Ballan (172)
4	Belgium	1014	Boonen (410), Van Den Broeck (237), De Gendt (134), Van Avermaet (121), Gilbert (112)
5	Australia	962	Gerrans (390), Rogers (194), Evans (182), Goss (114), Porte (82)
6	Netherlands	733	Mollema (194), Terpstra (160), Boom (148), Gesink (134), Westra (97)
7	United States	530	van Garderen (160), Talansky (145), Horner (120), Leipheimer (75), Danielson (30)
8	Norway	449	Boasson Hagen (317), Nordhaug (122), Kristoff (9), Hushovd (1)
9	Germany	447	T. Martin (171), Greipel (162), Gerdemann (51), Klöden (40), Wegmann (23)
10	Portugal	412	Costa (320), Machado (92)
11	Colombia	404	Urán (199), Henao (194), Quintana (6), Anacona (4), Sarmiento (1)
12	France	367	Chavanel (113), Démare (87), Pinot (85), Péraud (42), Le Mével (40)
13	Slovakia	361	P. Sagan (351), P. Velits (10)
14	Switzerland	357	Albasini (183), Cancellara (134), Zaugg (20), Tschopp (18), Frank (2)
15	Canada	278	Hesjedal (241), Tuft (37)

- Riders from 35 countries scored points.

== Leader Progress ==
Event (Winner)	Individual	Team	Nation
Tour Down Under (Simon Gerrans)	Simon Gerrans	RadioShack–Nissan	Australia
Paris–Nice (Bradley Wiggins)	Alejandro Valverde	Team Sky	Spain
Tirreno–Adriatico (Vincenzo Nibali)	Alejandro Valverde	RadioShack–Nissan	Spain
Milan–San Remo (Simon Gerrans)	Simon Gerrans	RadioShack–Nissan	Italy
E3 Harelbeke (Tom Boonen)	Simon Gerrans	RadioShack–Nissan	Spain
Volta a Catalunya (Michael Albasini)	Simon Gerrans	GreenEDGE	Spain
Gent–Wevelgem (Tom Boonen)	Simon Gerrans	Team Sky	Spain
Tour of Flanders (Tom Boonen)	Tom Boonen	Liquigas–Cannondale	Belgium
Tour of the Basque Country (Samuel Sánchez)	Tom Boonen	Omega Pharma–Quick-Step	Spain
Paris–Roubaix (Tom Boonen)	Tom Boonen	Omega Pharma–Quick-Step	Spain
Amstel Gold Race (Enrico Gasparotto)	Tom Boonen	Omega Pharma–Quick-Step	Spain
Flèche Wallonne (Joaquim Rodríguez)	Tom Boonen	Omega Pharma–Quick-Step	Spain
Liège–Bastogne–Liège (Maxim Iglinsky)	Tom Boonen	Omega Pharma–Quick-Step	Spain
Tour de Romandie (Bradley Wiggins)	Tom Boonen	Omega Pharma–Quick-Step	Spain
Giro d'Italia (Ryder Hesjedal)	Joaquim Rodríguez	Team Katusha	Spain
Critérium du Dauphiné (Bradley Wiggins)	Joaquim Rodríguez	Team Sky	Spain
Tour de Suisse (Rui Costa)	Joaquim Rodríguez	Team Sky	Spain
Tour de Pologne (Moreno Moser)	Joaquim Rodríguez	Team Sky	Spain
Tour de France (Bradley Wiggins)	Bradley Wiggins	Team Sky	Spain
Eneco Tour (Lars Boom)	Bradley Wiggins	Team Sky	Spain
Clásica de San Sebastián (Luis León Sánchez)	Bradley Wiggins	Team Sky	Spain
Vattenfall Cyclassics (Arnaud Démare)	Bradley Wiggins	Team Sky	Spain
GP Ouest-France (Edvald Boasson Hagen)	Bradley Wiggins	Team Sky	Spain
GP de Québec (Simon Gerrans)	Bradley Wiggins	Team Sky	Spain
Vuelta a España (Alberto Contador)	Bradley Wiggins	Team Sky	Spain
GP de Montréal (Lars Petter Nordhaug)	Bradley Wiggins	Team Sky	Spain
World TTT Championships (Omega Pharma–Quick-Step)	Bradley Wiggins	Team Sky	Spain
Giro di Lombardia (Joaquim Rodríguez)	Joaquim Rodríguez	Team Sky	Spain
Tour of Beijing (Tony Martin)	Joaquim Rodríguez	Team Sky	Spain
