= 2012 La Flèche Wallonne =

2012 UCI World Tour, race 12 of 28
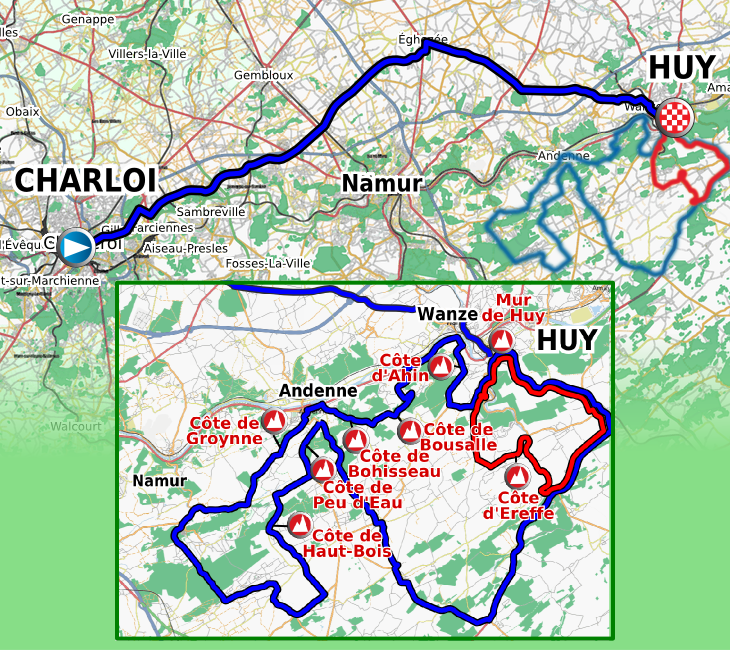

Race details
- Dates: 18 April 2012
- Stages: 1
- Distance: 194 km (120.5 mi)
- Winning time: 4h 45' 41"

Results
	Winner	Joaquim Rodríguez (ESP)	(Team Katusha)
	Second	Michael Albasini (SUI)	(GreenEDGE)
	Third	Philippe Gilbert (BEL)	(BMC Racing Team)

The 2012 La Flèche Wallonne was the 76th running of La Flèche Wallonne, a single-day cycling race. It was held on 18 April 2012 over a distance of 194 kilometres (120.5 miles) and was the twelfth race of the 2012 UCI World Tour season.

The race was won by Team Katusha rider Joaquim Rodríguez – a former two-time runner-up in the race – after making a late-race attack on the Mur de Huy. Second place went to GreenEDGE's Michael Albasini, while defending race winner Philippe Gilbert rounded out the podium placings for BMC Racing Team.

== Teams ==
As La Flèche Wallonne was a UCI World Tour event, all 18 UCI ProTeams were invited automatically and obligated to send a squad. Seven other squads were given wildcard places into the race, and as such, formed the event's 25-team peloton.

The 25 teams that competed in the race were:

- Accent.jobs–Willems Veranda's
- Ag2r–La Mondiale
- Argos–Shimano
- Astana
- BMC Racing Team
- Colombia–Coldeportes
- Euskaltel–Euskadi
- FDJ–BigMat
- Garmin–Barracuda
- GreenEDGE
- Team Katusha
- Lampre–ISD
- Landbouwkrediet–Euphony
- Liquigas–Cannondale
- Lotto–Belisol
- Movistar Team
- Omega Pharma–Quick-Step
- Rabobank
- RadioShack–Nissan
- Saur–Sojasun
- Team Saxo Bank
- Team Sky
- Topsport Vlaanderen–Mercator
- Team Type 1–Sanofi
- Vacansoleil–DCM

== Results ==
	Cyclist	Team	Time	World Tour Points
1	Joaquim Rodríguez (ESP)	Team Katusha	4h 45' 41"	80
2	Michael Albasini (SUI)	GreenEDGE	+ 4"	60
3	Philippe Gilbert (BEL)	BMC Racing Team	+ 4"	50
4	Jelle Vanendert (BEL)	Lotto–Belisol	+ 4"	40
5	Robert Kišerlovski (CRO)	Astana	+ 7"	30
6	Dan Martin (IRL)	Garmin–Barracuda	+ 9"	22
7	Bauke Mollema (NED)	Rabobank	+ 9"	14
8	Vincenzo Nibali (ITA)	Liquigas–Cannondale	+ 9"	10
9	Diego Ulissi (ITA)	Lampre–ISD	+ 9"	6
10	Jurgen Van den Broeck (BEL)	Lotto–Belisol	+ 11"	2
