= 2012 Liège–Bastogne–Liège =

2012 UCI World Tour, race 13 of 28

Race details
- Dates: 22 April 2012
- Stages: 1
- Distance: 257.5 km (160.0 mi)
- Winning time: 6h 43' 52"

Results
	Winner	Maxim Iglinsky (Kazakhstan)	(Astana)
	Second	Vincenzo Nibali (Italy)	(Liquigas–Cannondale)
	Third	Enrico Gasparotto (Italy)	(Astana)

The 2012 Liège–Bastogne–Liège was the 98th running of the Liège–Bastogne–Liège, a single-day cycling race. It was held on 22 April 2012 over a distance of 257.5 kilometres (160.0 miles), starting in Liège and finishing in Ans, via Bastogne in the Ardennes region of Belgium. It was the thirteenth race of the 2012 UCI World Tour season.

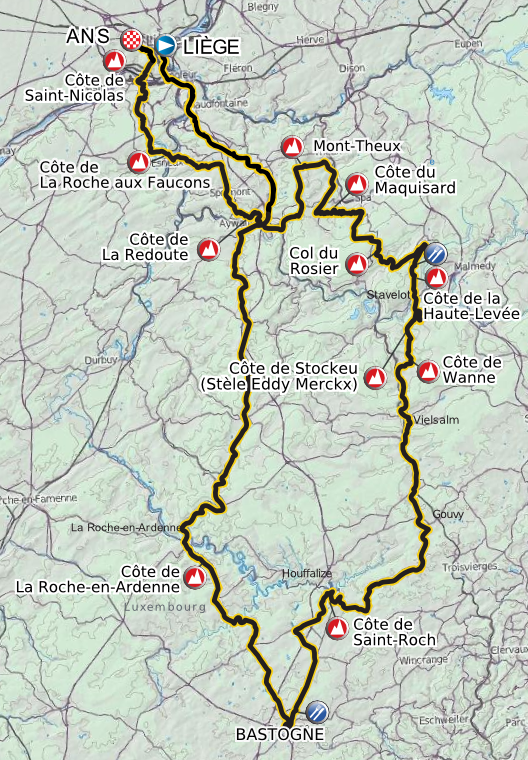
Map of the course

The race was won by Astana rider Maxim Iglinsky after catching Liquigas–Cannondale's Vincenzo Nibali in the closing stages after the latter attempted to win with a 20 km (12.4 mi) attack. Iglinsky caught him with around 1 km (0.6 mi) to go, and eventually won by 21 seconds over Nibali, while Amstel Gold Race winner Enrico Gasparotto rounded out the podium placings for Astana. Defending race-winner Philippe Gilbert (BMC Racing Team) could only finish sixteenth in the race, almost 90 seconds down on Iglinsky.

== Participating teams ==
As Liège–Bastogne–Liège was a UCI World Tour event, all 18 UCI ProTeams were invited automatically and obliged to send a squad. Seven other squads were given wildcard places into the race, and as such, formed the event's 25-team peloton.

The teams that were invited – wildcard teams denoted by * – were:

- Accent.jobs–Willems Veranda's*
- Ag2r–La Mondiale
- Argos–Shimano*
- Astana
- BMC Racing Team
- Euskaltel–Euskadi
- FDJ–BigMat
- Garmin–Barracuda
- GreenEDGE
- Team Katusha
- Lampre–ISD
- Landbouwkrediet–Euphony*
- Liquigas–Cannondale
- Lotto–Belisol
- Movistar Team
- Omega Pharma–Quick-Step
- Rabobank
- RadioShack–Nissan
- Saur–Sojasun*
- Team Europcar*
- Team Saxo Bank
- Team Sky
- Team Type 1–Sanofi*
- Topsport Vlaanderen–Mercator*
- Vacansoleil–DCM

== Results ==
	Cyclist	Team	Time	UCI World Tour Points
1	Maxim Iglinsky (KAZ)	Astana	6h 43' 52"	100
2	Vincenzo Nibali (ITA)	Liquigas–Cannondale	+ 21"	80
3	Enrico Gasparotto (ITA)	Astana	+ 36"	70
4	Thomas Voeckler (FRA)	Team Europcar	+ 36"	–
5	Dan Martin (IRE)	Garmin–Barracuda	+ 36"	50
6	Bauke Mollema (NED)	Rabobank	+ 36"	40
7	Samuel Sánchez (ESP)	Euskaltel–Euskadi	+ 36"	30
8	Michele Scarponi (ITA)	Lampre–ISD	+ 36"	20
9	Ryder Hesjedal (CAN)	Garmin–Barracuda	+ 36"	10
10	Jelle Vanendert (BEL)	Lotto–Belisol	+ 36"	4
