= 2012 E3 Harelbeke =

2012 UCI World Tour, race 6 of 28

Race details
- Dates: 23 March 2012
- Stages: 1
- Distance: 203 km (126 mi)
- Winning time: 4h 51' 59"

Results
	Winner	Tom Boonen (Belgium)	(Omega Pharma–Quick-Step)
	Second	Óscar Freire (Spain)	(Team Katusha)
	Third	Bernhard Eisel (Austria)	(Team Sky)

The 2012 E3 Harelbeke was the 55th running of the E3 Harelbeke single-day cycling race. It was held on 23 March over a distance of 203 kilometres (126.1 miles) and was the sixth race of the 2012 UCI World Tour season. E3 Harelbeke was held as a UCI World Tour event for the first time, after previously being held as a 1.HC race on the UCI Europe Tour. As well as its promotion to the World Tour, the race moved to a Friday running from a Saturday; the move was in order to give riders a day's break prior to the following World Tour event, Gent–Wevelgem.

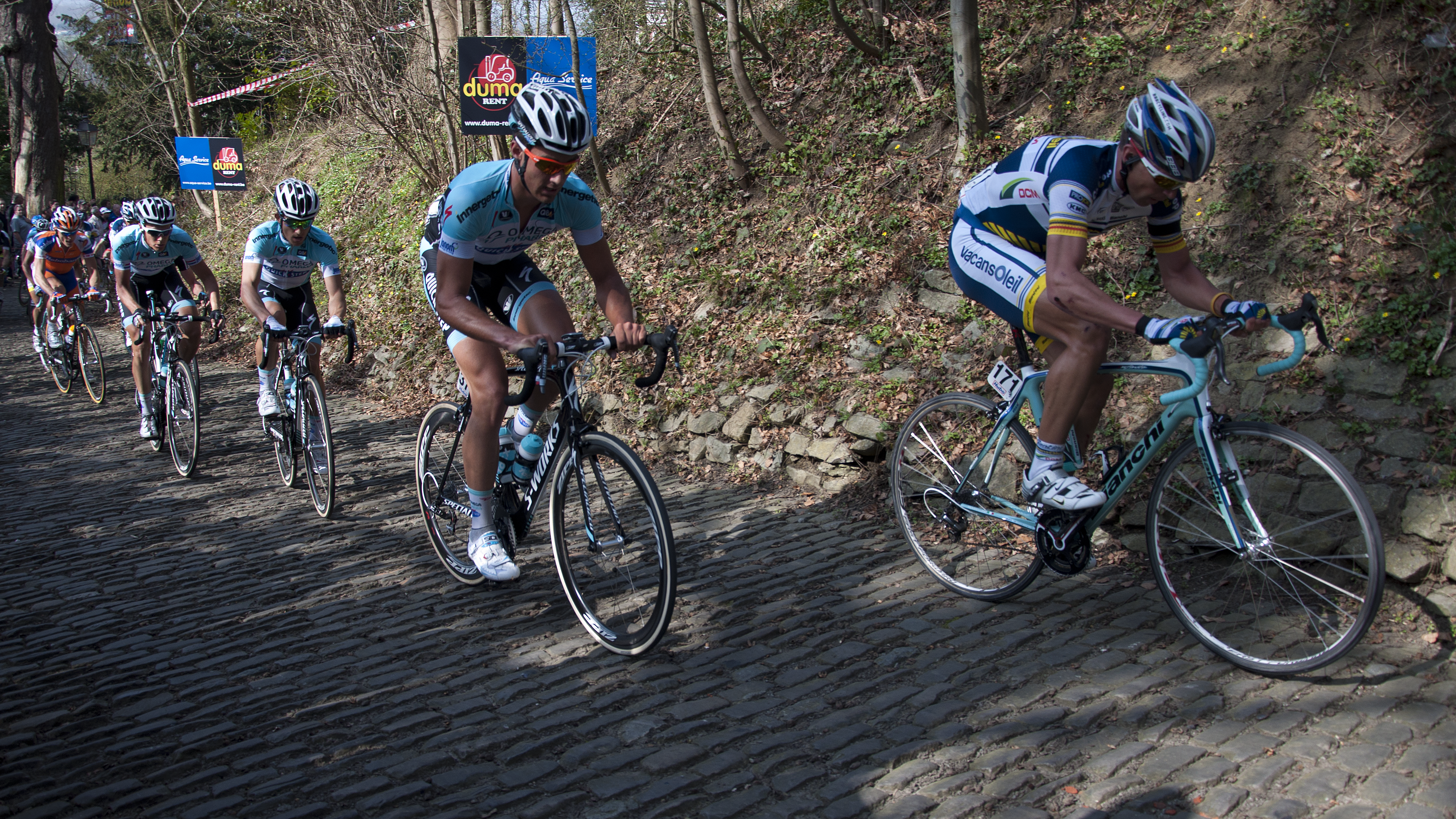
Stijn Devolder leads over the Muur

In a mass sprint finish, the race was won by Omega Pharma–Quick-Step rider Tom Boonen, who in the process, became the most successful rider in the history of the race; his fifth victory – after four previous victories in succession between 2004 and 2007 – in Harelbeke took him beyond the record tally of four victories that he had been sharing with fellow Belgian rider Rik Van Looy. Boonen finished ahead of Team Katusha's Óscar Freire and Team Sky's Bernhard Eisel, who completed the podium.

== Teams ==
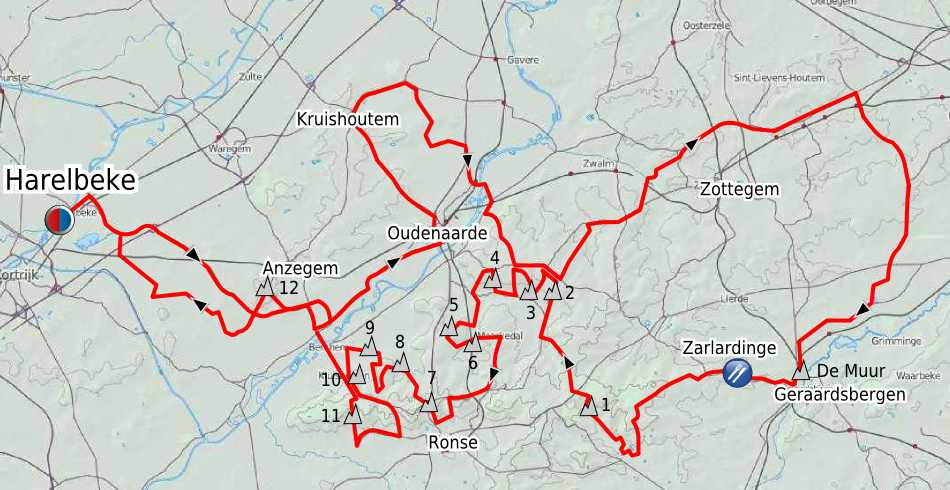
Route of E3 Harelbeke 2012

As E3 Harelbeke was a UCI World Tour event, all 18 UCI ProTeams were invited automatically and obligated to send a squad. Seven other squads were given wildcard places into the race, and as such, formed the event's 25-team peloton.

The 25 teams that competed in the race were:

- Accent.jobs–Willems Veranda's
- Ag2r–La Mondiale
- Astana
- BMC Racing Team
- Cofidis
- Team Europcar
- Euskaltel–Euskadi
- Farnese Vini–Selle Italia
- FDJ–BigMat
- Garmin–Barracuda
- GreenEDGE
- Team Katusha
- Lampre–ISD
- Landbouwkrediet–Euphony
- Liquigas–Cannondale
- Lotto–Belisol
- Movistar Team
- Omega Pharma–Quick-Step
- Project 1t4i
- Rabobank
- RadioShack–Nissan
- Team Saxo Bank
- Team Sky
- Topsport Vlaanderen–Mercator
- Vacansoleil–DCM

== Results ==
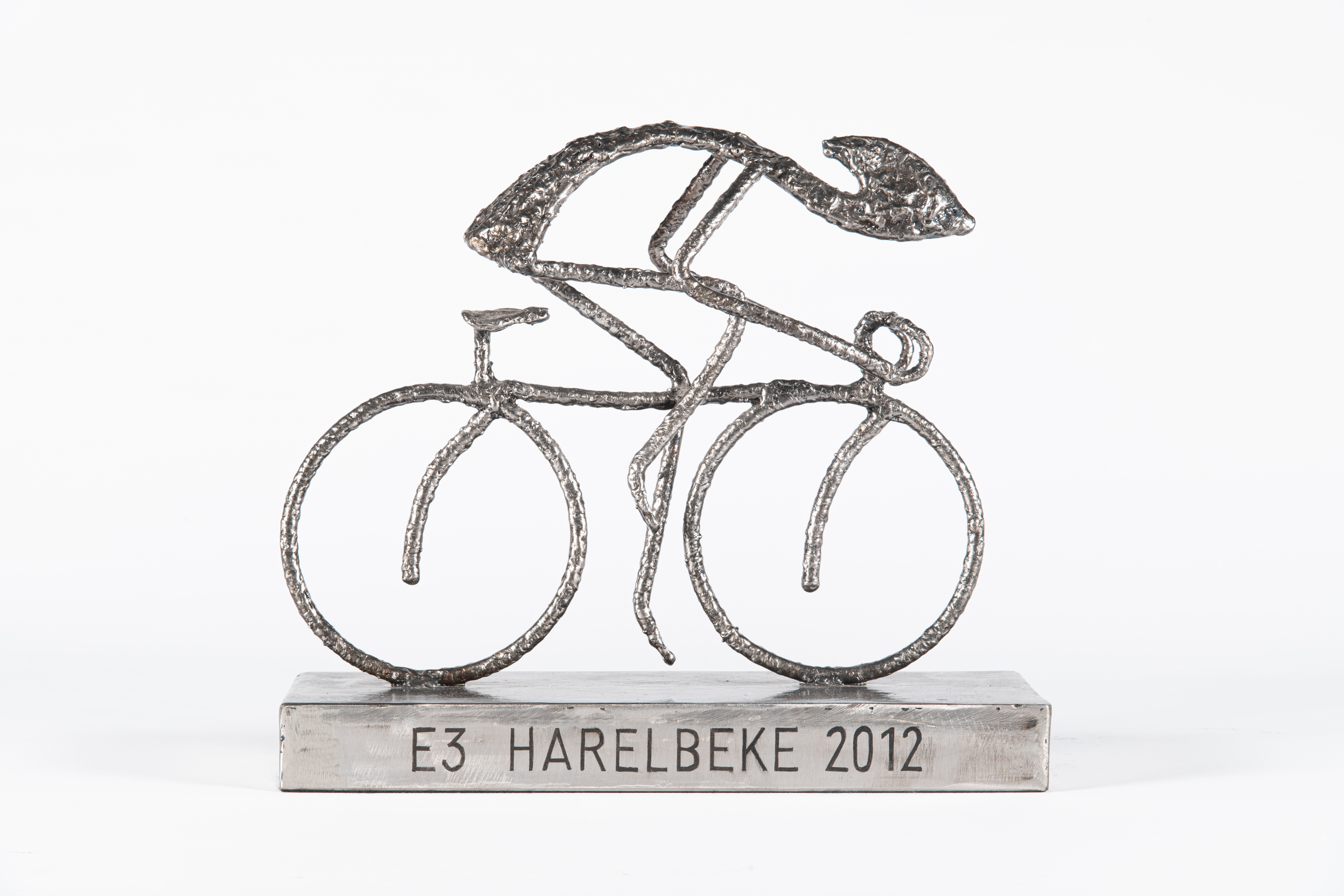
Trophy of 2012 E3 Harelbeke won by Tom Boonen (collection KOERS. Museum of Cycle Racing)

	Cyclist	Team	Time
1	Tom Boonen (BEL)	Omega Pharma–Quick-Step	4h 51' 59"
2	Óscar Freire (ESP)	Team Katusha	s.t.
3	Bernhard Eisel (AUT)	Team Sky	s.t.
4	Leonardo Duque (COL)	Cofidis	s.t.
5	Sep Vanmarcke (BEL)	Garmin–Barracuda	s.t.
6	John Degenkolb (GER)	Project 1t4i	s.t.
7	Mathieu Ladagnous (FRA)	FDJ–BigMat	s.t.
8	Alexandre Pichot (FRA)	Team Europcar	s.t.
9	Alessandro Ballan (ITA)	BMC Racing Team	s.t.
10	Sébastien Turgot (FRA)	Team Europcar	s.t.
