= 2012 Paris–Roubaix =

2012 UCI World Tour, race 10 of 28
- Official event poster

Race details
- Dates: 8 April 2012
- Stages: 1
- Distance: 257.5 km (160.0 mi)
- Winning time: 5h 55' 22"

Results
	Winner	Tom Boonen (BEL)	(Omega Pharma–Quick-Step)
	Second	Sébastien Turgot (FRA)	(Team Europcar)
	Third	Alessandro Ballan (ITA)	(BMC Racing Team)

The 2012 Paris–Roubaix was the 110th running of the Paris–Roubaix single-day cycling race, often known as the Hell of the North. It was held on 8 April 2012 over a distance of 257.5 kilometres (160.0 miles) and was the tenth race of the 2012 UCI World Tour season.

Omega Pharma–Quick-Step's Tom Boonen won the race for a record-equalling fourth time, after riding alone for 53 km (32.9 mi). With 56 km (34.8 mi) to go Boonen had made a breakaway with teammate Niki Terpstra, but the latter quickly proved unable to follow the Belgian. Boonen continued solo to win in Roubaix by over a minute and a half. The second place was settled in a sprint finish with Team Europcar's Sébastien Turgot just edging out Alessandro Ballan of BMC Racing Team.

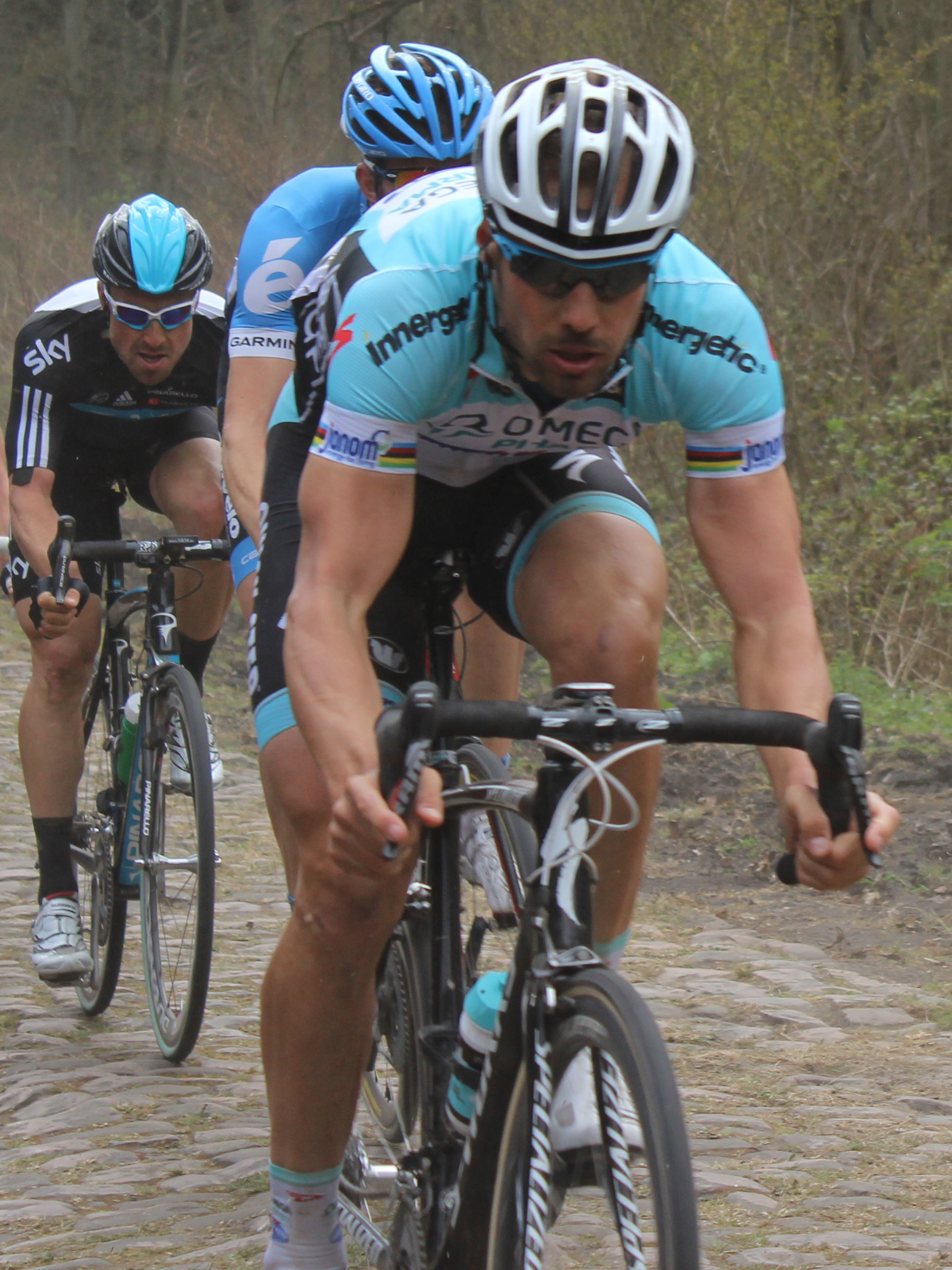
Tom Boonen, Johan Vansummeren and Bernhard Eisel

== Teams ==
Riders from 25 teams took part in the 2012 Paris–Roubaix. These are:

Teams for Paris-Roubaix

- Ag2r–La Mondiale
- Astana
- BMC Racing Team
- Euskaltel–Euskadi
- FDJ–BigMat
- Garmin–Barracuda
- GreenEDGE
- Team Katusha
- Lampre–ISD
- Liquigas–Cannondale
- Lotto–Belisol
- Movistar Team
- Omega Pharma–Quick-Step
- Rabobank
- RadioShack–Nissan
- Team Saxo Bank
- Team Sky
- Vacansoleil–DCM

Wild Cards

- Argos–Shimano
- Bretagne–Schuller
- Cofidis
- Farnese Vini–Selle Italia
- Saur–Sojasun
- Team Europcar
- Team NetApp

== Results ==
Results (1–10)
	Cyclist	Team	Time
1	Tom Boonen (BEL)	Omega Pharma–Quick-Step	5h 55' 22"
2	Sébastien Turgot (FRA)	Team Europcar	+ 1' 39"
3	Alessandro Ballan (ITA)	BMC Racing Team	+ 1' 39"
4	Juan Antonio Flecha (ESP)	Team Sky	+ 1' 39"
5	Niki Terpstra (NED)	Omega Pharma–Quick-Step	+ 1' 39"
6	Lars Boom (NED)	Rabobank	+ 1' 43"
7	Matteo Tosatto (ITA)	Team Saxo Bank	+ 3' 31"
8	Mathew Hayman (AUS)	Team Sky	+ 3' 31"
9	Johan Vansummeren (BEL)	Garmin–Barracuda	+ 3' 31"
10	Maarten Wynants (BEL)	Rabobank	+ 3' 31"

== See also ==
- 2012 in road cycling
