= 2012 Amstel Gold Race =

2012 UCI World Tour, race 11 of 28
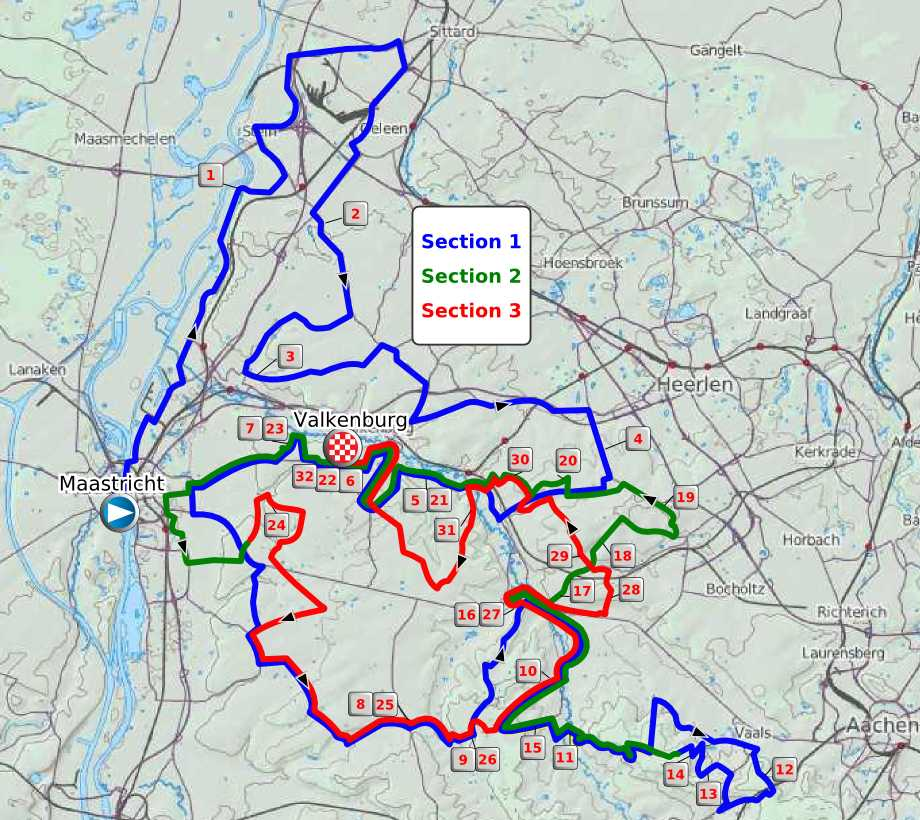

Race details
- Dates: 15 April 2012
- Stages: 1
- Distance: 256.5 km (159.4 mi)
- Winning time: 6h

Results
	Winner	Enrico Gasparotto (ITA)	(Astana)
	Second	Jelle Vanendert (BEL)	(Lotto–Belisol)
	Third	Peter Sagan (SVK)	(Liquigas–Cannondale)

The 2012 Amstel Gold Race was the 47th running of the Amstel Gold Race, a single-day cycling race. It was held on 15 April 2012 over a distance of 256.5 kilometres (159.4 miles) and was the eleventh race of the 2012 UCI World Tour season.

The race was won by Astana rider Enrico Gasparotto after outsprinting several of his rivals to the finish on the Cauberg; it was his first Classics victory, and the first by an Italian rider in a one-day classic since Damiano Cunego won the 2008 Giro di Lombardia. Second place went to Lotto–Belisol's Jelle Vanendert, while Peter Sagan rounded out the podium placings for the Liquigas–Cannondale team. Two-time defending race winner Philippe Gilbert (BMC Racing Team) finished in the same time as Sagan, but was classified in sixth place.

== Teams ==
As the Amstel Gold Race was a UCI World Tour event, all 18 UCI ProTeams were invited automatically and obligated to send a squad. Six other squads were given wildcard places into the race, and as such, formed the event's 24-team peloton.

The 24 teams that competed in the race were:

- Accent.jobs–Willems Veranda's
- Ag2r–La Mondiale
- Argos–Shimano
- Astana
- BMC Racing Team
- Team Europcar
- Euskaltel–Euskadi
- Farnese Vini–Selle Italia
- FDJ–BigMat
- Garmin–Barracuda
- GreenEDGE
- Team Katusha
- Lampre–ISD
- Landbouwkrediet–Euphony
- Liquigas–Cannondale
- Lotto–Belisol
- Movistar Team
- Omega Pharma–Quick-Step
- Rabobank
- RadioShack–Nissan
- Team Saxo Bank
- Team Sky
- Topsport Vlaanderen–Mercator
- Vacansoleil–DCM

== Results ==
	Rider	Team	Time	World Tour Points
1	Enrico Gasparotto (ITA)	Astana	6h 32' 35"	80
2	Jelle Vanendert (BEL)	Lotto–Belisol	s.t.	60
3	Peter Sagan (SVK)	Liquigas–Cannondale	+ 2"	50
4	Óscar Freire (ESP)	Team Katusha	+ 2"	40
5	Thomas Voeckler (FRA)	Team Europcar	+ 2"	–
6	Philippe Gilbert (BEL)	BMC Racing Team	+ 2"	22
7	Samuel Sánchez (ESP)	Euskaltel–Euskadi	+ 2"	14
8	Fabian Wegmann (GER)	Garmin–Barracuda	+ 4"	10
9	Rinaldo Nocentini (ITA)	Ag2r–La Mondiale	+ 4"	6
10	Bauke Mollema (NED)	Rabobank	+ 4"	2
