= 2012 Tour of Beijing =

2012 UCI World Tour, race 28 of 28

Race details
- Dates: 9–13 October 2012
- Stages: 5
- Distance: 753.5 km (468.2 mi)
- Winning time: 17h 16' 56"

Results
Jersey awarded to the overall winner	Winner	Tony Martin (Germany)	(Omega Pharma–Quick-Step)
	Second	Francesco Gavazzi (Italy)	(Astana)
	Third	Edvald Boasson Hagen (Norway)	(Team Sky)
Jersey awarded to the points classification winner	Points	Edvald Boasson Hagen (Norway)	(Team Sky)
Jersey awarded to the mountains classification winner	Mountains	Dan Martin (Republic of Ireland)	(Garmin–Sharp)
Jersey awarded to the young rider classification winner	Young rider	Rafał Majka (Poland)	(Saxo Bank–Tinkoff Bank)
	Team	Liquigas–Cannondale	

The 2012 Tour of Beijing was the second running of the Tour of Beijing stage race. It started on 9 October at Tiananmen Square and ended on 13 October in Beijing's Pinggu District after five stages. It was the 28th and final race of the 2012 UCI World Tour season.

The race was won for the second successive year by German rider Tony Martin, riding for the Omega Pharma–Quick-Step team. Martin won the second stage of the race with a solo attack 25 km (15.5 mi) from the end of the stage, and ultimately won the stage by 46 seconds from his nearest competitor. He held the overall lead of the race until its conclusion, eventually winning the race by 40 seconds from Astana rider Francesco Gavazzi, who won the race's queen stage on the third day. Team Sky's Edvald Boasson Hagen completed the podium, 6 seconds behind Gavazzi and 46 down on Martin, and also won the points classification for the most consistent finisher on the stages over the race.

In the race's other classifications, fourth-placed overall Dan Martin (Garmin–Sharp) won the mountains classification, seventh-placed overall Rafał Majka was the winner of the young rider classification for Saxo Bank–Tinkoff Bank, and Liquigas–Cannondale were the victors in the teams classification.

== Schedule ==
The race again consisted of five stages; unlike the 2011 edition of the race, there was no individual time trial stage after Tony Martin maintained his race lead from his time trial win to the end of the race. Ahead of the race, the second stage was modified following rainstorms in the region earlier in the year; the stage was originally scheduled for 134 km (83.3 mi), but was ultimately shortened to 126 km (78.3 mi).

Stage	Date	Course	Distance	Type	Winner
1	9 October	Tiananmen Square to Bird's Nest	117 km (72.7 mi)	Flat Stage	Elia Viviani (ITA)
2	10 October	Bird's Nest to MenTouGou	126 km (78.3 mi)	Flat Stage	Tony Martin (GER)
3	11 October	MenTouGou to Badaling Great Wall	162.5 km (101.0 mi)	Mountain Stage	Francesco Gavazzi (ITA)
4	12 October	YanQing Gui Chuan Square to Chang Ping	165.5 km (102.8 mi)	Mountain Stage	Marco Haller (AUT)
5	13 October	Chang Ping to Ping Gu	182.5 km (113 mi)	Mountain Stage	Steve Cummings (GBR)

== Participating teams ==
As the Tour of Beijing was a UCI World Tour event, all eighteen UCI ProTeams were invited automatically and obligated to send a squad. Originally, the race organisers awarded a wildcard place in the race to the Argos–Shimano team, but they withdrew from the race following political tension between China and Japan, which resulted in Japanese riders being asked to leave September's Tour of China, that was held as part of the 2011–2012 UCI Asia Tour. They were ultimately replaced by the Champion System team, and as such, formed the event's 19-team peloton.

The nineteen teams that competed in the race were:

- Ag2r–La Mondiale
- Astana
- BMC Racing Team
- Champion System
- Euskaltel–Euskadi
- FDJ–BigMat
- Garmin–Sharp
- Team Katusha
- Lampre–ISD
- Liquigas–Cannondale
- Lotto–Belisol
- Movistar Team
- Omega Pharma–Quick-Step
- Orica–GreenEDGE
- Rabobank
- RadioShack–Nissan
- Saxo Bank–Tinkoff Bank
- Team Sky
- Vacansoleil–DCM

== Stages ==
=== Stage 1 ===
9 October 2012 — Tiananmen Square to Bird's Nest, 117 km (72.7 mi)

The race-opening stage was a circuit race around several of the venues that were part of the 2008 Summer Olympics, primarily between the Bird's Nest and the Water Cube. After starting at Tiananmen Square and following a 23.5 km (14.6 mi) run-in, the peloton had to complete twelve full laps of a circuit measuring 7.8 km (4.8 mi) in length. Prior to the end of the stage on the thirteenth passage through the finish line, points – along with time bonuses – were on offer at a pair of intermediate sprint points, held on the fourth and eighth passages respectively. As a result, the stage was widely expected to finish in a bunch sprint, with very little undulation throughout the circuit. with a maximum of around 10 metres (33 ft) in elevation changes.

A group of five riders – Omega Pharma–Quick-Step rider Marco Bandiera, Mathieu Ladagnous of FDJ–BigMat, Adriano Malori (Lampre–ISD), Vacansoleil–DCM's Bert-Jan Lindeman as well as Craig Lewis for the Champion System team – was established prior to them entering the circuit, at around the 14 km (8.7 mi) point of the stage. The quintet manage to form an advantage of around two minutes, with the main field keeping the gap in check for most of the day. The breakaway swept up the bonus seconds on offer at the sprint points, with Ladagnous gaining the most as he was first across the line at both for six bonus seconds. The group were swept up on the penultimate lap, setting up the ultimate sprint for the line; Elia Viviani sprinted down the left-hand side of the road for Liquigas–Cannondale, and managed to fend off his rivals for his seventh win of 2012, and assumed the lead of all three classifications on offer on the day. Andrew Fenn finished second for Omega Pharma–Quick-Step, ahead of Team Sky's Edvald Boasson Hagen.

Stage 1 Result

	Rider	Team	Time
1	Elia Viviani (ITA)	Liquigas–Cannondale	2h 37' 49"
2	Andrew Fenn (GBR)	Omega Pharma–Quick-Step	s.t.
3	Edvald Boasson Hagen (NOR)	Team Sky	s.t.
4	Kenny van Hummel (NED)	Vacansoleil–DCM	s.t.
5	Greg Henderson (NZL)	Lotto–Belisol	s.t.
6	Theo Bos (NED)	Rabobank	s.t.
7	Enrique Sanz (ESP)	Movistar Team	s.t.
8	Aidis Kruopis (LTU)	Orica–GreenEDGE	s.t.
9	Alessandro Petacchi (ITA)	Lampre–ISD	s.t.
10	Klaas Lodewyck (BEL)	BMC Racing Team	s.t.

General Classification after Stage 1

	Rider	Team	Time
1	Elia Viviani (ITA)	Liquigas–Cannondale	2h 37' 39"
2	Andrew Fenn (GBR)	Omega Pharma–Quick-Step	+ 4"
3	Mathieu Ladagnous (FRA)	FDJ–BigMat	+ 6"
4	Edvald Boasson Hagen (NOR)	Team Sky	+ 6"
5	Kenny van Hummel (NED)	Vacansoleil–DCM	+ 10"
6	Greg Henderson (NZL)	Lotto–Belisol	+ 10"
7	Theo Bos (NED)	Rabobank	+ 10"
8	Enrique Sanz (ESP)	Movistar Team	+ 10"
9	Aidis Kruopis (LTU)	Orica–GreenEDGE	+ 10"
10	Alessandro Petacchi (ITA)	Lampre–ISD	+ 10"

=== Stage 2 ===
10 October 2012 — Bird's Nest to MenTouGou, 126 km (78.3 mi)

Following flooding in Beijing in July that caused the deaths of 79 people, race organisers were forced to re-route part of the stage, but maintained the stage start at the Bird's Nest and the finish in MenTouGou. Ultimately, the stage was slightly shortened from its original itinerary of 134 km (83.3 mi) to 126 km (78.3 mi), maintaining three categorised climbs during the parcours. Prior to the start of the stage, it emerged that one of the race's competitors – Ag2r–La Mondiale rider Steve Houanard – had tested positive for the glycoprotein hormone erythropoietin (EPO), a performance-enhancing drug, in an out of competition doping test and was asked to leave the race after being suspended by the Union Cycliste Internationale.

On the stage itself, five riders – Rabobank's Juan Manuel Gárate, David Tanner of Saxo Bank–Tinkoff Bank, Mathias Frank (BMC Racing Team), Team Katusha rider Maxim Belkov and Iván Gutiérrez for the Movistar Team – instigated the breakaway around a quarter of the way through the stage, gaining a maximum advantage of over three minutes at one point. A small group of riders bridged up to the lead group after the peloton had nearly brought them back, and they remained out front until the end. Defending race winner Tony Martin (Omega Pharma–Quick-Step) attacked this lead group with 25 km (15.5 mi) remaining, on the climb of the Dong Gang Hong Tunnel, and sped away to win by around 45 seconds to record his first road stage win since the 2009 Tour de Suisse. His margin of victory allowed him to take the red leader's jersey, as well as the green jersey as points leader.

Stage 2 Result

	Rider	Team	Time
1	Tony Martin (GER)	Omega Pharma–Quick-Step	2h 53' 05"
2	Francesco Gavazzi (ITA)	Astana	+ 46"
3	Eros Capecchi (ITA)	Liquigas–Cannondale	+ 46"
4	Rinaldo Nocentini (ITA)	Ag2r–La Mondiale	+ 46"
5	Tomasz Marczyński (POL)	Vacansoleil–DCM	+ 46"
6	Dan Martin (IRL)	Garmin–Sharp	+ 46"
7	Tom-Jelte Slagter (NED)	Rabobank	+ 46"
8	Rafał Majka (POL)	Saxo Bank–Tinkoff Bank	+ 46"
9	David Tanner (AUS)	Saxo Bank–Tinkoff Bank	+ 50"
10	Simon Clarke (AUS)	Orica–GreenEDGE	+ 50"

General Classification after Stage 2

	Rider	Team	Time
1	Tony Martin (GER)	Omega Pharma–Quick-Step	5h 30' 44"
2	Francesco Gavazzi (ITA)	Astana	+ 50"
3	Eros Capecchi (ITA)	Liquigas–Cannondale	+ 52"
4	Edvald Boasson Hagen (NOR)	Team Sky	+ 56"
5	Rinaldo Nocentini (ITA)	Ag2r–La Mondiale	+ 56"
6	Dan Martin (IRL)	Garmin–Sharp	+ 56"
7	Tomasz Marczyński (POL)	Vacansoleil–DCM	+ 56"
8	Rafał Majka (POL)	Saxo Bank–Tinkoff Bank	+ 56"
9	Tim Wellens (BEL)	Lotto–Belisol	+ 1' 00"
10	Rui Costa (POR)	Movistar Team	+ 1' 00"

=== Stage 3 ===
11 October 2012 — MenTouGou to Badaling Great Wall, 162.5 km (101.0 mi)

The queen stage of the Tour of Beijing saw the riders negotiate four categorised climbs during the stage's 162.5 km (101.0 mi) itinerary, ending in the first summit finish in the Tour's short history. The final climb to the Great Wall of China in Badaling was another venue part of the 2008 Summer Olympics – as part of the Urban Road Cycling Course – and the climb itself was a short, punchy climb of around 1 km (0.62 mi) in length and at an average gradient of 6.3%. Smog would also play a part in the stage's proceedings; after two previously clear days during the race, hazy conditions greeted the riders ahead of the start. Prior to the race, air quality levels were at a "severely polluted" level according to figures released by the Chinese Ministry of Environmental Protection.

With Tony Martin in the overall lead for the Omega Pharma–Quick-Step team, they played a prominent part at closing down attacks in the early stages, before a seven-rider breakaway was allowed to be formed, just before the quarter-way point of the stage. Best-placed of the riders was Mathieu Ladagnous of FDJ–BigMat, who had featured in the opening day's breakaway, at around three minutes behind Martin. The group gained a maximum advantage of about four-and-a-half minutes before the likes of Liquigas–Cannondale and Garmin–Sharp sent riders to the front of the peloton to bring the gap down. The group was eventually caught with around 9 km (5.6 mi) remaining, with several counter-attacks occurring from then on.

Sylvain Georges (Ag2r–La Mondiale) launched an attack to try to get clear, but Team Sky – aiding with the pace at the front of the main group – closed him down before he could establish a sizable advantage. Defending mountains classification winner Igor Antón (Euskaltel–Euskadi) was the next rider to try but he too was thwarted before the attack could fully materialise. Instead, Team Sky's all-rounder Edvald Boasson Hagen attacked with 3.5 km (2.2 mi) remaining, and held a near 20-second lead into the final kilometre, but was closed down in the final metres, with Astana's Francesco Gavazzi taking his first victory for the team and his first since winning a stage of the 2011 Vuelta a España. Boasson Hagen finished third on the stage as he was also beaten to the line by Garmin–Sharp rider Dan Martin; Tony Martin held on to his race lead, with a reduced advantage of 40 seconds over Gavazzi, following the stage-winning time bonus – introduced for the 2012 edition – for Gavazzi.

Stage 3 Result

	Rider	Team	Time
1	Francesco Gavazzi (ITA)	Astana	4h 05' 08"
2	Dan Martin (IRL)	Garmin–Sharp	s.t.
3	Edvald Boasson Hagen (NOR)	Team Sky	s.t.
4	Rinaldo Nocentini (ITA)	Ag2r–La Mondiale	s.t.
5	Rui Costa (POR)	Movistar Team	s.t.
6	Tom-Jelte Slagter (NED)	Rabobank	s.t.
7	Eros Capecchi (ITA)	Liquigas–Cannondale	s.t.
8	Moreno Moser (ITA)	Liquigas–Cannondale	s.t.
9	Mathias Frank (SUI)	BMC Racing Team	s.t.
10	Daniele Pietropolli (ITA)	Lampre–ISD	s.t.

General Classification after Stage 3

	Rider	Team	Time
1	Tony Martin (GER)	Omega Pharma–Quick-Step	9h 35' 52"
2	Francesco Gavazzi (ITA)	Astana	+ 40"
3	Dan Martin (IRL)	Garmin–Sharp	+ 50"
4	Edvald Boasson Hagen (NOR)	Team Sky	+ 52"
5	Eros Capecchi (ITA)	Liquigas–Cannondale	+ 52"
6	Rinaldo Nocentini (ITA)	Ag2r–La Mondiale	+ 56"
7	Tomasz Marczyński (POL)	Vacansoleil–DCM	+ 56"
8	Rafał Majka (POL)	Saxo Bank–Tinkoff Bank	+ 56"
9	Rui Costa (POR)	Movistar Team	+ 1' 00"
10	Tim Wellens (BEL)	Lotto–Belisol	+ 1' 00"

=== Stage 4 ===
12 October 2012 — YanQing Gui Chuan Square to Chang Ping, 165.5 km (102.8 mi)

The penultimate stage of the Tour of Beijing consisted of a long loop around YanQing – making up most of the itinerary for the first half of the stage, 165.5 km (102.8 mi) in length – before the riders had to negotiate three categorised climbs (within 25 km (15.5 mi) of racing) in the Jundu Mountains, in the second half of the stage. Each of the three climbs were third-category and equally measured 2.3 km (1.4 mi) in length, with average gradients for the climbs ranging from 4.2% to 5.2% respectively. From the top of the final climb – just outside Xiezishi – it was all downhill for the remaining 31.5 km (19.6 mi) of the parcours into the finish in Chang Ping, with the stage finishing near to the district's gymnastics stadium.

A group of five riders – made up of Garmin–Sharp's Alex Howes, Team Katusha rider Timofey Kritskiy, Mitchell Docker of Orica–GreenEDGE, Alex Dowsett (Team Sky) and Jérémy Roy, riding for the FDJ–BigMat team – were allowed to create a breakaway inside the opening 20 km (12.4 mi) of the stage, with none of the quintet threatening overall leader Tony Martin (Omega Pharma–Quick-Step) in the general classification. The leaders had gained an advantage of around six-and-a-half minutes towards halfway through the stage, before Omega Pharma–Quick-Step along with the sprinters' teams started to cut into the advantage. Roy attacked his breakaway companions towards the summit of the final climb; he held almost three minutes over the field at the summit, but he was caught with 5 km (3.1 mi) to go. As a result, this eventually set up a bunch sprint that was won by Kritskiy's team-mate Marco Haller, a neo-pro, who achieved his first professional victory on the line.

Stage 4 Result

	Rider	Team	Time
1	Marco Haller (AUT)	Team Katusha	3h 35' 39"
2	Alessandro Petacchi (ITA)	Lampre–ISD	s.t.
3	Elia Viviani (ITA)	Liquigas–Cannondale	s.t.
4	Lucas Sebastián Haedo (ARG)	Saxo Bank–Tinkoff Bank	s.t.
5	Daniele Bennati (ITA)	RadioShack–Nissan	s.t.
6	Francesco Chicchi (ITA)	Omega Pharma–Quick-Step	s.t.
7	Klaas Lodewyck (BEL)	BMC Racing Team	s.t.
8	Allan Davis (AUS)	Orica–GreenEDGE	s.t.
9	Edvald Boasson Hagen (NOR)	Team Sky	s.t.
10	Dominique Rollin (CAN)	FDJ–BigMat	s.t.

General Classification after Stage 4

	Rider	Team	Time
1	Tony Martin (GER)	Omega Pharma–Quick-Step	13h 11' 31"
2	Francesco Gavazzi (ITA)	Astana	+ 40"
3	Dan Martin (IRL)	Garmin–Sharp	+ 50"
4	Edvald Boasson Hagen (NOR)	Team Sky	+ 52"
5	Eros Capecchi (ITA)	Liquigas–Cannondale	+ 52"
6	Rinaldo Nocentini (ITA)	Ag2r–La Mondiale	+ 56"
7	Tomasz Marczyński (POL)	Vacansoleil–DCM	+ 56"
8	Rafał Majka (POL)	Saxo Bank–Tinkoff Bank	+ 56"
9	Rui Costa (POR)	Movistar Team	+ 1' 00"
10	Tim Wellens (BEL)	Lotto–Belisol	+ 1' 00"

=== Stage 5 ===
13 October 2012 — Chang Ping to Ping Gu, 182.5 km (113.4 mi)

The final stage of the race was also its longest stage, with an itinerary consisting of 182.5 km (113.4 mi) of racing. Two of the day's four categorised climbs were negotiated inside the first 30 km (18.6 mi), with the peloton having a relatively flat ride for 100 km (62.1 mi) beyond that. Two further categorised climbs – a second-category climb to Tai Hou Village, followed by the first-category ascent of Si Zuo Lou, averaging gradients of 6.7% and 5.9% respectively – featured on the parcours before a long descent towards Ping Gu's Century Square, and the end of the race. The race remained together for the first hour of racing, with mountains classification leader Dan Martin (Garmin–Sharp) gaining the most, claiming maximum points at each of the first two climbs.

After that, a twelve-rider move got clear of the main field but the peloton failed to let them gain a substantial advantage over them; the maximum gap that the group acquired was around two minutes. The group started to break apart on the climb to Tai Hou Village, while Martin's team-mate Ryder Hesjedal made a solo move from the main field, and soon joined up with the lead group; on the final climb, the group was reduced to a trio as only Hesjedal, RadioShack–Nissan rider Jan Bakelants and BMC Racing Team's Steve Cummings remained. Bakelants lost contact before the summit, and Hesjedal and Cummings remained clear of the field for the rest of the day. Cummings followed Hesjedal into Ping Gu, and out-sprinted him for his second victory of the season. Edvald Boasson Hagen led the main field home seventeen seconds later, to confirm himself as the points classification winner and third in the general classification – down to bonus seconds – behind Astana's Francesco Gavazzi, and the repeat victor Tony Martin of Omega Pharma–Quick-Step.

Stage 5 Result

	Rider	Team	Time
1	Steve Cummings (GBR)	BMC Racing Team	4h 05' 08"
2	Ryder Hesjedal (CAN)	Garmin–Sharp	+ 2"
3	Edvald Boasson Hagen (NOR)	Team Sky	+ 17"
4	Daniele Bennati (ITA)	RadioShack–Nissan	+ 17"
5	Tim Wellens (BEL)	Lotto–Belisol	+ 17"
6	Francesco Gavazzi (ITA)	Astana	+ 17"
7	Tom-Jelte Slagter (NED)	Rabobank	+ 17"
8	Rafał Majka (POL)	Saxo Bank–Tinkoff Bank	+ 17"
9	Mathias Frank (SUI)	BMC Racing Team	+ 17"
10	Simon Clarke (AUS)	Orica–GreenEDGE	+ 17"

Final General Classification

	Rider	Team	Time
1	Tony Martin (GER)	Omega Pharma–Quick-Step	17h 16' 56"
2	Francesco Gavazzi (ITA)	Astana	+ 40"
3	Edvald Boasson Hagen (NOR)	Team Sky	+ 46"
4	Dan Martin (IRL)	Garmin–Sharp	+ 50"
5	Eros Capecchi (ITA)	Liquigas–Cannondale	+ 52"
6	Rinaldo Nocentini (ITA)	Ag2r–La Mondiale	+ 56"
7	Rafał Majka (POL)	Saxo Bank–Tinkoff Bank	+ 56"
8	Tomasz Marczyński (POL)	Vacansoleil–DCM	+ 56"
9	Rui Costa (POR)	Movistar Team	+ 1' 00"
10	Tim Wellens (BEL)	Lotto–Belisol	+ 1' 00"

== Classification leadership table ==
Stage	Winner	General classification	Mountains classification	Points classification	Young rider classification	Team Classification
1	Elia Viviani	Elia Viviani	not awarded	Elia Viviani	Elia Viviani	Movistar Team
2	Tony Martin	Tony Martin	Dan Martin	Tony Martin	Rafał Majka	Astana
3	Francesco Gavazzi	Tony Martin	Dan Martin	Francesco Gavazzi	Rafał Majka	Liquigas–Cannondale
4	Marco Haller	Tony Martin	Dan Martin	Edvald Boasson Hagen	Rafał Majka	Liquigas–Cannondale
5	Steve Cummings	Tony Martin	Dan Martin	Edvald Boasson Hagen	Rafał Majka	Liquigas–Cannondale
Final		Tony Martin	Dan Martin	Edvald Boasson Hagen	Rafał Majka	Liquigas–Cannondale
