= Jelle Vanendert =

Belgian road racing cyclist

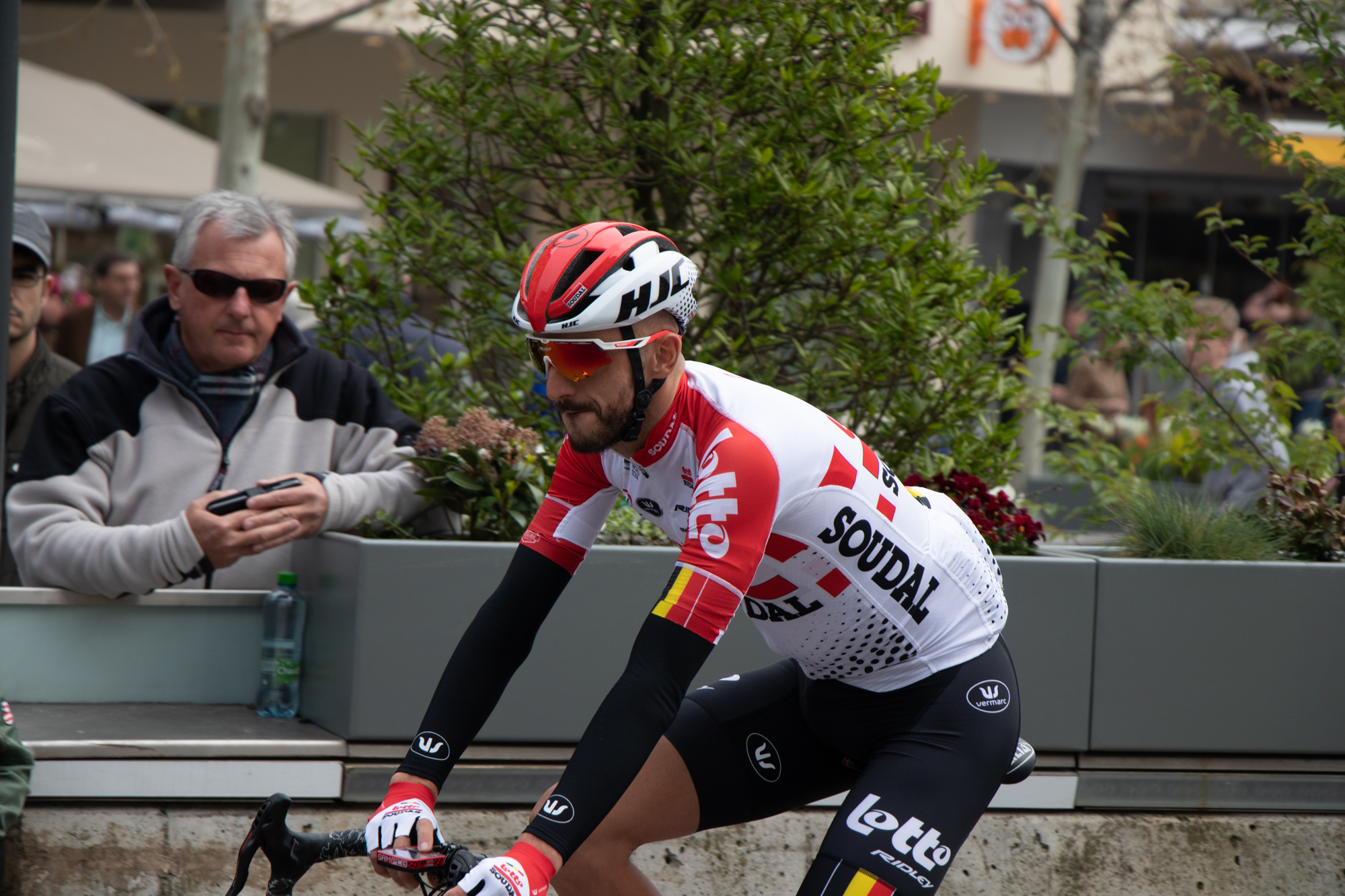
- Vanendert in 2019.

Personal information
- Full name: Jelle Vanendert
- Born: 19 February 1985 (age 41) Neerpelt, Flanders, Belgium
- Height: 1.84 m (6 ft 1/2 in)
- Weight: 65 kg (143 lb)

Cycling career
- Sport: Cycling
- Current team: Wagner Bazin WB
- Discipline: Road
- Role: Rider
- Rider type: Climber

Amateur teams
- 2004: Jartazi Granville Team
- 2005–2006: Bodysol–Win for Life–Jong Vlaanderen

Professional teams
- 2007: Chocolade Jacques–Topsport Vlaanderen
- 2008: Française des Jeux
- 2009–2019: Silence–Lotto
- 2020–2021: Bingoal–Wallonie Bruxelles

Major wins
- Grand Tours Tour de France 1 individual stage (2011)

Jelle Vanendert (born 19 February 1985) is a Belgian former professional road racing cyclist, who last rode for UCI ProTeam Bingoal Pauwels Sauces WB. He competed in a total of ten Grand Tours during his career. His younger brother Dennis Vanendert also competed professionally with the Lotto–Soudal team between 2012 and 2015.

== Career ==
In 2011, Vanendert showed good form at La Flèche Wallonne, where he came sixth. He rode the Tour de France initially as the main climbing domestique for Jurgen Van den Broeck. However, when his leader crashed out of the race, Vanendert was given a free role, and on Stage 14 attacked from the group of GC contenders to win the stage. Vanendert finished 20th overall and also wore the King of the Mountains Jersey.

Vanendert was the leader of Lotto–Belisol in the 2012 Ardennes classics, and finished second in the Amstel Gold Race, fourth in La Flèche Wallonne and tenth in Liège–Bastogne–Liège.

In August 2021, Vanendert announced that he would retire from competition at the end of the season.

== Major results ==
2004
8th Circuit de Wallonie
2005
4th Flèche Ardennaise
2006
1st Grand Prix de Waregem
1st Stage 2 Ronde de l'Isard
3rd Overall Giro delle Regioni
5th Road race, UCI Under-23 Road World Championships
5th Circuit de Wallonie
7th Road race, UEC European Under-23 Road Championships
7th Grand Prix de Wallonie
10th Druivenkoers Overijse
2007
1st De Vlaamse Pijl
5th Beverbeek Classic
8th Grand Prix de Wallonie
9th Hel van het Mergelland
2009
6th Eschborn–Frankfurt City Loop
9th Overall Tour of Austria
2011
Tour de France

1st Stage 14
Held after Stages 14–19

6th La Flèche Wallonne
9th Clásica de San Sebastián
2012
2nd Amstel Gold Race
4th La Flèche Wallonne
7th Brabantse Pijl
10th Liège–Bastogne–Liège
10th Grote Prijs Jef Scherens
2014
2nd Amstel Gold Race
4th Grand Prix de Wallonie
6th La Flèche Wallonne
6th Clásica de San Sebastián
8th Druivenkoers Overijse
2015
5th Grand Prix de Wallonie
2016
4th Overall Tour de Wallonie
5th Halle–Ingooigem
7th Druivenkoers Overijse
2017
4th Overall Tour de Wallonie
7th Grand Prix de Wallonie
2018
2nd Overall Tour of Belgium

1st Stage 4

3rd La Flèche Wallonne
4th Grand Prix de Wallonie
10th Amstel Gold Race
2019
7th Clásica de San Sebastián
9th La Flèche Wallonne

=== General classification results timeline ===
| Grand Tour | 2008 | 2009 | 2010 | 2011 | 2012 | 2013 | 2014 | 2015 | 2016 | 2017 | 2018 | 2019 | 2020 |
|---|---|---|---|---|---|---|---|---|---|---|---|---|---|
| Giro d'Italia | — | DNF | — | — | — | — | — | — | 92 | — | — | DNF | — |
| Tour de France | — | — | — | 19 | 29 | — | — | — | — | — | DNF | — | — |
| Vuelta a España | 101 | — | DNF | — | — | DNF | — | 82 | — | — | — | — | — |

=== Classics results timeline ===
| Monument | 2005 | 2006 | 2007 | 2008 | 2009 | 2010 | 2011 | 2012 | 2013 | 2014 | 2015 | 2016 | 2017 | 2018 | 2019 | 2020 |
|---|---|---|---|---|---|---|---|---|---|---|---|---|---|---|---|---|
| Milan–San Remo | — | — | — | — | — | — | — | 92 | — | DNF | 49 | 88 | — | — | — | — |
| Tour of Flanders | Did not contest during his career | | | | | | | | | | | | | | | |
| Paris–Roubaix | Did not contest during his career | | | | | | | | | | | | | | | |
| Liège–Bastogne–Liège | — | — | 26 | 82 | 25 | — | 17 | 10 | 18 | 11 | 22 | 22 | 19 | 11 | DNF | |
| Giro di Lombardia | — | — | — | DNF | — | — | — | DNF | 35 | 12 | — | DNF | DNF | — | DNF | — |
| Classic | 2005 | 2006 | 2007 | 2008 | 2009 | 2010 | 2011 | 2012 | 2013 | 2014 | 2015 | 2016 | 2017 | 2018 | 2019 | 2020 |
| Brabantse Pijl | 75 | DNF | 25 | 17 | 45 | — | 25 | 7 | — | — | — | 15 | 20 | 40 | 35 | |
| Amstel Gold Race | — | — | 54 | 37 | 28 | — | 13 | 2 | 13 | 2 | 34 | 26 | 37 | 10 | 33 | NH |
| La Flèche Wallonne | — | — | 13 | 51 | 38 | — | 6 | 4 | 39 | 6 | DNF | 18 | 17 | 3 | 9 | 12 |
| Clásica de San Sebastián | — | — | — | — | — | 64 | 9 | 29 | — | 6 | 36 | 21 | 15 | 20 | 7 | NH |

Legend
| — | Did not compete |
| DNF | Did not finish |
| DSQ | Disqualified |
