= 2012 Tour de Pologne =

2012 UCI World Tour, race 19 of 28
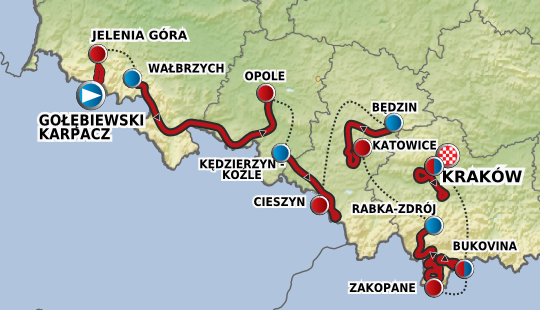
- Route of the 2012 Tour de Pologne.

Race details
- Dates: 10–16 July 2012
- Stages: 7
- Distance: 1,231.6 km (765.3 mi)
- Winning time: 30h 15' 49"

Results
Jersey awarded to the overall winner	Winner	Moreno Moser (Italy)	(Liquigas–Cannondale)
	Second	Michał Kwiatkowski (Poland)	(Omega Pharma–Quick-Step)
	Third	Sergio Henao (Colombia)	(Team Sky)
Jersey awarded to the points classification winner	Points	Ben Swift (Great Britain)	(Team Sky)
Jersey awarded to the mountains classification winner	Mountains	Tomasz Marczyński (Poland)	(Vacansoleil–DCM)
Jersey awarded to the sprints classification winner	Sprints	Adrian Kurek (Poland)	(Utensilnord–Named)
	Team	Team Sky	

The 2012 Tour de Pologne was the 69th running of the Tour de Pologne cycling stage race. It started on 10 July in Karpacz and ended on 16 July in Kraków, after seven stages. It was the 19th race of the 2012 UCI World Tour season.

The race was won by Liquigas–Cannondale rider Moreno Moser, who claimed the leader's yellow jersey after winning the penultimate stage, and maintained the lead of the race until its conclusion; he also won the race's opening stage, his first wins at World Tour level. Moser's winning margin over runner-up Michał Kwiatkowski of Omega Pharma–Quick-Step – the highest-placed Polish rider – was five seconds, and Team Sky's Sergio Henao completed the podium, eleven seconds down on Kwiatkowski and sixteen behind Moser.

In the race's other classifications, Vacansoleil–DCM rider Tomasz Marczyński won the King of the Mountains classification, Team Sky's Ben Swift won the white jersey for the points classification after winning two stages during the event, and Adrian Kurek of Utensilnord–Named won the intermediate sprints classification, for the second year in succession. As well as their two-stage victories, Team Sky finished at the head of the teams classification.

== Schedule ==
Aside from entering the Czech Republic (to the city of Český Těšín on the border with Poland) during the third stage, the race stages started and ended in Polish locations.

Stage characteristics and winners
Stage	Date	Route	Distance	Type	Winner
1	10 July	Karpacz to Jelenia Góra	179.5 km (111.5 mi)	Mountain stage	Moreno Moser (ITA)
2	11 July	Wałbrzych to Opole	239.4 km (148.8 mi)	Flat stage	Ben Swift (GBR)
3	12 July	Kędzierzyn-Koźle to Cieszyn	201.7 km (125.3 mi)	Medium-mountain stage	Zdeněk Štybar (CZE)
4	13 July	Będzin to Katowice	124.7 km (77.5 mi)	Flat stage	Aidis Kruopis (LTU)
5	14 July	Rabka-Zdrój to Zakopane	163.1 km (101.3 mi)	Mountain stage	Ben Swift (GBR)
6	15 July	Terma Bukowina Tatrzańska to Bukowina Tatrzańska	191.8 km (119.2 mi)	Mountain stage	Moreno Moser (ITA)
7	16 July	Kraków to Kraków	131.4 km (81.6 mi)	Flat stage	John Degenkolb (GER)

== Participating teams ==
As the Tour de Pologne was a UCI World Tour event, all eighteen UCI ProTeams were invited automatically and obligated to send a squad. Along with Team Poland BGŻ – the Polish national team – six other squads were given wildcard places into the race, and as such, formed the event's 25-team peloton.

The twenty-five teams that competed in the race were:

- Ag2r–La Mondiale
- Argos–Shimano
- Astana
- BMC Racing Team
- Caja Rural
- Colnago–CSF Bardiani
- Euskaltel–Euskadi
- Farnese Vini–Selle Italia
- FDJ–BigMat
- Garmin–Sharp
- Team Katusha
- Lampre–ISD
- Liquigas–Cannondale
- Lotto–Belisol
- Movistar Team
- Omega Pharma–Quick-Step
- Orica–GreenEDGE
- Team Poland BGŻ
- Rabobank
- RadioShack–Nissan
- Saxo Bank–Tinkoff Bank
- Team Sky
- Team Type 1–Sanofi
- Utensilnord–Named
- Vacansoleil–DCM

== Stages ==
=== Stage 1 ===
10 July 2012 — Karpacz to Jelenia Góra, 179.5 km (111.5 mi)

The opening stage of the Tour began with 22.7 km (14.1 mi) of riding, prior to entering a 39.2 km (24.4 mi) loop around Karpacz and Jelenia Góra, where the riders would complete four laps before the finish. Included on each lap was a first-category climb at the Karpacz Orlinek, a site for ski jumping during the winter months, while on the third full lap of the circuit, there was an intermediate sprint in Karpacz offering bonus seconds towards the general classification. A five-rider breakaway was initiated in the early kilometres of the stage; the move consisted of Ag2r–La Mondiale's Sylvain Georges, Saxo Bank–Tinkoff Bank rider Jarosław Marycz, Daniel Teklehaymanot of Orica–GreenEDGE, Federico Rocchetti (Utensilnord–Named) and Bartłomiej Matysiak, riding for the representative Team Poland BGŻ.

The quintet opened up a maximum advantage of nine minutes over the rest of the field during the second circuit, as rain began to dampen the parcours, and it eventually resulted in a crash in the main field. Among the riders going down were Omega Pharma–Quick-Step teammates Tom Boonen and Niki Terpstra, as well as Liquigas–Cannondale's Fabio Sabatini; of the riders, only Boonen was able to rejoin the peloton, as Terpstra abandoned after the crash due to injuries suffered, and Sabatini was taken off the parcours in an ambulance but suffered only heavy bruising in the incident. Team Sky's Sergio Henao tried to chase down the leaders from out of peloton, but could not bridge the gap to them. Marycz, Teklehaymanot and Georges dropped Rocchetti and Matysiak with around 30 km (18.6 mi) remaining of the stage, with Astana bringing the advantage to beneath two minutes.

Georges looked to go clear on his own, on the fourth and final climb of the Karpacz Orlinek but could not hold off until the summit when the peloton, now led by Henao and his teammate Lars Petter Nordhaug, swept past him. The work carried out by Team Sky and Astana on the front of the peloton had reduced the main field to just 36 riders. Alexandr Kolobnev launched an attack on the descent of the climb for Team Katusha but was brought back to the peloton. Christophe Le Mével then went clear for Garmin–Sharp but he was passed by a secondary move by Kolobnev inside of the final 2.5 km (1.6 mi) of the stage. However, Kolobnev faded on the false flat to the finish; from the reduced pack, Liquigas–Cannondale's Moreno Moser launched a late attack – akin to his victories in the Trofeo Laigueglia and the Eschborn-Frankfurt City Loop earlier in the year – and managed to hold off the rest of the field for his first World Tour victory. Moser finished ahead of the best-placed Polish rider Michał Kwiatkowski (Omega Pharma–Quick-Step) and Rabobank rider Lars Boom.

Stage 1 Result

	Rider	Team	Time
1	Moreno Moser (ITA)	Liquigas–Cannondale	4h 32' 53"
2	Michał Kwiatkowski (POL)	Omega Pharma–Quick-Step	s.t.
3	Lars Boom (NED)	Rabobank	s.t.
4	Fabian Wegmann (GER)	Garmin–Sharp	s.t.
5	Manuele Mori (ITA)	Lampre–ISD	s.t.
6	Jan Bakelants (BEL)	RadioShack–Nissan	s.t.
7	Giovanni Visconti (ITA)	Movistar Team	s.t.
8	Matti Breschel (DEN)	Rabobank	s.t.
9	Michał Gołaś (POL)	Omega Pharma–Quick-Step	s.t.
10	Martin Elmiger (SUI)	Ag2r–La Mondiale	s.t.

General Classification after Stage 1

	Rider	Team	Time
1	Moreno Moser (ITA)	Liquigas–Cannondale	4h 32' 43"
2	Michał Kwiatkowski (POL)	Omega Pharma–Quick-Step	+ 4"
3	Lars Boom (NED)	Rabobank	+ 6"
4	Fabian Wegmann (GER)	Garmin–Sharp	+ 10"
5	Manuele Mori (ITA)	Lampre–ISD	+ 10"
6	Jan Bakelants (BEL)	RadioShack–Nissan	+ 10"
7	Giovanni Visconti (ITA)	Movistar Team	+ 10"
8	Matti Breschel (DEN)	Rabobank	+ 10"
9	Michał Gołaś (POL)	Omega Pharma–Quick-Step	+ 10"
10	Martin Elmiger (SUI)	Ag2r–La Mondiale	+ 10"

=== Stage 2 ===
11 July 2012 — Wałbrzych to Opole, 239.4 km (148.8 mi)

With a parcours of 239.4 km (148.8 mi), the second stage was the longest of the 2012 edition of the Tour de Pologne. On the route from Wałbrzych, there were three intermediate sprint points in the towns of Paczków, Prudnik and Krapkowice, as well as a third-category climb in the village of Chrząszczyce, 28 km (17.4 mi) from the end of the stage. The final 18 km (11.2 mi) of the stage was conducted in three laps of a 6 km (3.7 mi) circuit within Opole. The breakaway was almost entirely made up of home riders, as Polish trio Damian Walczak, Łukasz Bodnar (both riding for the representative Team Poland BGŻ) and Utensilnord–Named's Adrian Kurek were joined at the head of proceedings by Italian Diego Caccia, riding for the Farnese Vini–Selle Italia team.

With Bodnar being best-placed of the quartet, at just 1' 13" behind overnight leader Moreno Moser of Liquigas–Cannondale, the peloton did not allow for them to accumulate a substantial advantage on the road, but the leaders did acquire a ten-minute advantage at one point. Bodnar did however gain nine seconds during the stage, by taking first place at each of the three intermediate sprint points, and assumed the red jersey for that classification. Once he had done so, he returned to the peloton to allow for their advantage to grow once again. The leaders were three minutes clear with 30 km (18.6 mi) remaining, when Caccia made his move off the front. By the time he crossed the finish line in Opole for the first time, with 18 km (11.2 mi) left, the lead had been almost halved. Caccia held off until the final lap, when he was caught by the sprinters' teams. Rabobank and Team Sky were prominent at the front of the main field for Theo Bos and Ben Swift respectively, and it was Swift that out-sprinted everyone for his first road win of the year. Moser maintained his race lead, despite crashing late on.

Stage 2 Result

	Rider	Team	Time
1	Ben Swift (GBR)	Team Sky	5h 49' 57"
2	Elia Viviani (ITA)	Liquigas–Cannondale	s.t.
3	Tom Boonen (BEL)	Omega Pharma–Quick-Step	s.t.
4	John Degenkolb (GER)	Argos–Shimano	s.t.
5	Sacha Modolo (ITA)	Colnago–CSF Bardiani	s.t.
6	Daniele Bennati (ITA)	RadioShack–Nissan	s.t.
7	Theo Bos (NED)	Rabobank	s.t.
8	Manuel Belletti (ITA)	Ag2r–La Mondiale	s.t.
9	Linus Gerdemann (GER)	RadioShack–Nissan	s.t.
10	Alexander Serebryakov (RUS)	Team Type 1–Sanofi	s.t.

General Classification after Stage 2

	Rider	Team	Time
1	Moreno Moser (ITA)	Liquigas–Cannondale	10h 22' 40"
2	Michał Kwiatkowski (POL)	Omega Pharma–Quick-Step	+ 4"
3	Lars Boom (NED)	Rabobank	+ 6"
4	Fabian Wegmann (GER)	Garmin–Sharp	+ 10"
5	Linus Gerdemann (GER)	RadioShack–Nissan	+ 10"
6	Manuele Mori (ITA)	Lampre–ISD	+ 10"
7	Sergio Henao (COL)	Team Sky	+ 10"
8	Michał Gołaś (POL)	Omega Pharma–Quick-Step	+ 10"
9	Giovanni Visconti (ITA)	Movistar Team	+ 10"
10	Romain Bardet (FRA)	Ag2r–La Mondiale	+ 10"

=== Stage 3 ===
12 July 2012 — Kędzierzyn-Koźle to Cieszyn, 201.7 km (125.3 mi)

The stage started in Kędzierzyn-Koźle, moving south-west towards the finish including a short distance covered in the Czech Republic around Český Těšín, before returning to Poland for the finish in Cieszyn. There were three categorised climbs, with two ascents of the Kubalonka climb – one during each lap of a 17.2 km (10.7 mi)-long intermediary circuit around the towns of Wisła and Czarne – and the other being a third of the way around a 6.3 km (3.9 mi) closing circuit in Cieszyn. As well as the climbs, there were also three intermediate sprint points during the 201.7 km (125.3 mi) parcours, held in Skoczów, Ustroń and in Český Těšín, prior to entering the finishing circuit which was to be completed three times. Three riders – Orica–GreenEDGE rider Fumiyuki Beppu, Utensilnord–Named's Gabriele Bosisio and Mateusz Taciak representing the national Team Poland BGŻ – went clear in the early kilometres of the stage, and quickly established a substantial lead on the road, reaching a maximum of seventeen minutes. However, this advantage was still not enough to last all the way to the finish; indeed, the trio were caught at the start of the first of three finishing circuits in Cieszyn.

A counter-attack of three more riders – Taciak's teammate Marek Rutkiewicz, Matteo Trentin of Omega Pharma–Quick-Step and FDJ–BigMat rider Jussi Veikkanen – went clear on the opening lap, but the peloton were closing in on them. Rutkiewicz went alone from the lead group, and was eventually caught by Team Sky's Sergio Henao, who had attacked from the main field; Henao had been placed seventh in the general classification overnight, trailing leader Moreno Moser (Liquigas–Cannondale) by just ten seconds, with ten bonus seconds on offer at the stage finish for the winner. Henao and Rutkiewicz resisted off the front until the final cobbled climb to the finish; Moser was in contention for the stage win, but it was Zdeněk Štybar who finished strongest for Omega Pharma–Quick-Step, taking victory – his first at World Tour level, and second win of the season – ahead of Astana's Francesco Gavazzi and Sacha Modolo of Colnago–CSF Bardiani. Moser's overall lead was reduced to one second, after Štybar's teammate Michał Kwiatkowski gained three seconds at one of the sprint points.

Stage 3 Result

	Rider	Team	Time
1	Zdeněk Štybar (CZE)	Omega Pharma–Quick-Step	5h 01' 51"
2	Francesco Gavazzi (ITA)	Astana	s.t.
3	Sacha Modolo (ITA)	Colnago–CSF Bardiani	s.t.
4	Michał Kwiatkowski (POL)	Omega Pharma–Quick-Step	s.t.
5	Moreno Moser (ITA)	Liquigas–Cannondale	s.t.
6	Rinaldo Nocentini (ITA)	Ag2r–La Mondiale	s.t.
7	Marek Rutkiewicz (POL)	Team Poland BGŻ	s.t.
8	Lars Boom (NED)	Rabobank	s.t.
9	Sergio Henao (COL)	Team Sky	s.t.
10	Björn Leukemans (BEL)	Vacansoleil–DCM	s.t.

General Classification after Stage 3

	Rider	Team	Time
1	Moreno Moser (ITA)	Liquigas–Cannondale	15h 24' 31"
2	Michał Kwiatkowski (POL)	Omega Pharma–Quick-Step	+ 1"
3	Lars Boom (NED)	Rabobank	+ 6"
4	Fabian Wegmann (GER)	Garmin–Sharp	+ 7"
5	Linus Gerdemann (GER)	RadioShack–Nissan	+ 9"
6	Sergio Henao (COL)	Team Sky	+ 10"
7	Manuele Mori (ITA)	Lampre–ISD	+ 10"
8	Michał Gołaś (POL)	Omega Pharma–Quick-Step	+ 10"
9	Rinaldo Nocentini (ITA)	Ag2r–La Mondiale	+ 10"
10	Alexandr Kolobnev (RUS)	Team Katusha	+ 10"

=== Stage 4 ===
13 July 2012 — Będzin to Katowice, 124.7 km (77.5 mi)

The fourth stage was seen as the best chance for the sprinters to take a stage victory out of the entire Tour de Pologne. At 127.8 km (79.4 mi), the parcours was the shortest of the Tour, with circuits in both the start town of Będzin – three laps of a 4.2 km (2.6 mi) circuit – and in the finishing location of Katowice, where six laps of an 8.1 km (5.0 mi) circuit were completed. There were two categorised climbs during the stage – both third-category – at Syberka and on the penultimate finishing circuit, as well as three intermediate sprint points at Dąbrowa Górnicza, Siemianowice Śląskie and on the fourth Katowice circuit. Michał Kwiatkowski of Omega Pharma–Quick-Step was first across the line at the first sprint point in Dąbrowa Górnicza, picking up three seconds on race leader Moreno Moser (Liquigas–Cannondale) thanks to help from teammate Tom Boonen, and became the virtual race leader on the route.

The breakaway was formed thereafter, with four riders making up the move; Utensilnord–Named rider Adrian Kurek was joined in the group by Farnese Vini–Selle Italia's Rafael Andriato, Martijn Verschoor of Team Type 1–Sanofi and Ángel Madrazo, representing the Movistar Team and the quartet managed to get clear by around three minutes at one point during the stage. However, they were not to be successful as they were brought back by the peloton on the final circuit in Katowice. Polish national champion Michał Gołaś (Omega Pharma–Quick-Step) looked to go clear, but he could not gain sufficient ground on the peloton in the closing stages. Thus, it was down to the sprinters' teams to sort out the order and tempo at the front of the main field. Team Sky looked to get Ben Swift into play for the sprint, but Aidis Kruopis (Orica–GreenEDGE) launched his sprint off Swift's wheel, and took his first win at World Tour level. Kwiatkowski held his two-second lead to the end of the stage, to take the yellow jersey from Moser. Kurek moved into the red jersey, thanks to points achieved in the day's breakaway.

Stage 4 Result

	Rider	Team	Time
1	Aidis Kruopis (LTU)	Orica–GreenEDGE	2h 43' 04"
2	Ben Swift (GBR)	Team Sky	s.t.
3	Theo Bos (NED)	Rabobank	s.t.
4	Daniele Bennati (ITA)	RadioShack–Nissan	s.t.
5	Alexander Porsev (RUS)	Team Katusha	s.t.
6	Jacopo Guarnieri (ITA)	Astana	s.t.
7	Heinrich Haussler (AUS)	Garmin–Sharp	s.t.
8	Alexander Kristoff (NOR)	Team Katusha	s.t.
9	Mathew Hayman (AUS)	Team Sky	s.t.
10	Lucas Sebastián Haedo (ARG)	Saxo Bank–Tinkoff Bank	s.t.

General Classification after Stage 4

	Rider	Team	Time
1	Michał Kwiatkowski (POL)	Omega Pharma–Quick-Step	18h 07' 33"
2	Moreno Moser (ITA)	Liquigas–Cannondale	+ 2"
3	Fabian Wegmann (GER)	Garmin–Sharp	+ 8"
4	Lars Boom (NED)	Rabobank	+ 8"
5	Linus Gerdemann (GER)	RadioShack–Nissan	+ 11"
6	Manuele Mori (ITA)	Lampre–ISD	+ 12"
7	Rinaldo Nocentini (ITA)	Ag2r–La Mondiale	+ 12"
8	Alexandr Kolobnev (RUS)	Team Katusha	+ 12"
9	Mathias Frank (SUI)	BMC Racing Team	+ 12"
10	Michał Gołaś (POL)	Omega Pharma–Quick-Step	+ 12"

=== Stage 5 ===
14 July 2012 — Rabka-Zdrój to Zakopane, 163.1 km (101.3 mi)

With six categorised climbs during the stage – one of which, the Wierch Olczański, came in the early running of the stage before three passes of a climb into Zakopane 3.2 km (2.0 mi) before the finish, as well as two climbs of the Głodówka – the stage was not originally suited towards the sprinters. A five-rider breakaway was formed in the early kilometres of the stage, consisting of Team Katusha's Mikhail Ignatiev, FDJ–BigMat rider Mickaël Delage, Bert De Backer of Argos–Shimano, Rafael Andriato (Farnese Vini–Selle Italia) and Davide Mucelli representing Utensilnord–Named. They managed to establish a maximum advantage of around four minutes on the peloton, which was led by Omega Pharma–Quick-Step, who were protecting the overall leader of the race, Michał Kwiatkowski.

As the leaders approached Zakopane for the first time, Ignatiev saw fit to attack off the front of the lead quintet and went away solo from the group. Delage later launched his own move, but remained a couple of minutes behind his former breakaway companion. However, he did not make much headway from the chasing peloton, who closed down a minute's gap before the second and final intermediate sprint of the day, coming with 34.7 km (21.6 mi) remaining in the town of Cyrhla. After Ignatiev had pedalled through for the three bonus seconds on offer for first, Liquigas–Cannondale's Moreno Moser, trailing Kwiatkowski by two seconds in the general classification overnight, made a bold move for the bonus time at the line. He did gain the two seconds for second place, but Kwiatkowski countered his move to take the one second for third, maintaining his overall lead by one second.

Ignatiev remained off the front until halfway around the final circuit, when he was caught by Movistar Team's David López García, but both riders were eventually brought back to the peloton. Four riders made a counter-move immediately after that, and managed to gather up a 25-second advantage into the final 10 km (6.2 mi) of the stage. RadioShack–Nissan's Jan Bakelants broke the group up with a solo attack, which sent Maciej Bodnar (Liquigas–Cannondale) back to the peloton, as he could not stay with the group. Bakelants was caught prior to reaching the final summit of the stage, with 3.2 km (2.0 mi) to go, which ultimately led for the sprint finish to be undertaken. Farnese Vini–Selle Italia were first to play their hand along with Rabobank's Michael Matthews, but both moves were far too early for any effect at the line. Bodnar's teammate Elia Viviani was behind, but was beaten to the sprint by the points leader Ben Swift (Team Sky), who took his second win of the race, and extended his lead in the classification.

Stage 5 Result

	Rider	Team	Time
1	Ben Swift (GBR)	Team Sky	4h 01' 22"
2	Elia Viviani (ITA)	Liquigas–Cannondale	s.t.
3	Pim Ligthart (NED)	Vacansoleil–DCM	s.t.
4	Giovanni Visconti (ITA)	Movistar Team	s.t.
5	Michael Matthews (AUS)	Rabobank	s.t.
6	Michał Kwiatkowski (POL)	Omega Pharma–Quick-Step	s.t.
7	Pierpaolo De Negri (ITA)	Farnese Vini–Selle Italia	s.t.
8	Jack Bauer (NZL)	Garmin–Sharp	s.t.
9	Sergio Henao (COL)	Team Sky	s.t.
10	Jure Kocjan (SLO)	Team Type 1–Sanofi	s.t.

General Classification after Stage 5

	Rider	Team	Time
1	Michał Kwiatkowski (POL)	Omega Pharma–Quick-Step	22h 08' 54"
2	Moreno Moser (ITA)	Liquigas–Cannondale	+ 1"
3	Lars Boom (NED)	Rabobank	+ 9"
4	Fabian Wegmann (GER)	Garmin–Sharp	+ 9"
5	Linus Gerdemann (GER)	RadioShack–Nissan	+ 12"
6	Manuele Mori (ITA)	Lampre–ISD	+ 13"
7	Rinaldo Nocentini (ITA)	Ag2r–La Mondiale	+ 13"
8	Alexandr Kolobnev (RUS)	Team Katusha	+ 13"
9	Michał Gołaś (POL)	Omega Pharma–Quick-Step	+ 13"
10	Mathias Frank (SUI)	BMC Racing Team	+ 13"

=== Stage 6 ===
15 July 2012 — Terma Bukowina Tatrzańska to Bukowina Tatrzańska, 191.8 km (119.2 mi)

The queen stage of the Tour de Pologne, the penultimate stage of the race consisted of a lap of 38.2 km (23.7 mi), followed by four laps of a 38.4 km (23.9 mi)-long circuit around Bukowina Tatrzańska with two first-category climbs on each lap; around 12 km (7.5 mi) into each lap, there was an ascent in the village of Ząb, with a maximum gradient of 11.4%, and a much steeper climb in Gliczarów Górny, with a maximum gradient of 21.5%. On the fourth lap, there was also an intermediate sprint point at Wierch Olczański, but as a whole, the stage remained below 1,000 m (3,300 ft) above sea level. Mountains classification leader Daniel Teklehaymanot (Orica–GreenEDGE) took maximum points at the day's opening climb prior to the breakaway being formed, extending his lead in the classification.

Thereafter, a five-rider breakaway was initiated around halfway around the opening circuit of the stage; the move consisted of Rabobank's Tom-Jelte Slagter, Astana rider Roman Kreuziger, Ian Stannard of Team Sky, Tomasz Marczyński (Vacansoleil–DCM) and Bartosz Huzarski, riding for the representative Team Poland BGŻ. The quintet were able to establish an advantage of around five minutes midway through the stage, but their advantage was not a stage-winning gap, as attacks from the peloton meant that they were surpassed on the final lap. Stannard's teammate Sergio Henao counter-attacked immediately after, where he was chased by Lampre–ISD's Przemysław Niemiec and Euskaltel–Euskadi rider Jon Izagirre. Stannard attacked once again, before Henao took a second chance of his own, attacking off the front of the peloton. Henao resisted capture until 50 m (160 ft) to go, where a quick-finishing Moreno Moser (Liquigas–Cannondale) surpassed him for his second stage win at the race. With Henao finishing second ahead of Omega Pharma–Quick-Step's Michał Kwiatkowski, Moser took the overall lead by five seconds, thanks to time bonuses.

Stage 6 Result

	Rider	Team	Time
1	Moreno Moser (ITA)	Liquigas–Cannondale	5h 16' 32"
2	Sergio Henao (COL)	Team Sky	s.t.
3	Michał Kwiatkowski (POL)	Omega Pharma–Quick-Step	s.t.
4	Greg Van Avermaet (BEL)	BMC Racing Team	+ 3"
5	Przemysław Niemiec (POL)	Lampre–ISD	+ 3"
6	Alexandr Kolobnev (RUS)	Team Katusha	+ 3"
7	Rinaldo Nocentini (ITA)	Ag2r–La Mondiale	+ 7"
8	Linus Gerdemann (GER)	RadioShack–Nissan	+ 7"
9	Jon Izagirre (ESP)	Euskaltel–Euskadi	+ 7"
10	Tiago Machado (POR)	RadioShack–Nissan	+ 7"

General Classification after Stage 6

	Rider	Team	Time
1	Moreno Moser (ITA)	Liquigas–Cannondale	27h 25' 17"
2	Michał Kwiatkowski (POL)	Omega Pharma–Quick-Step	+ 5"
3	Sergio Henao (COL)	Team Sky	+ 16"
4	Alexandr Kolobnev (RUS)	Team Katusha	+ 25"
5	Linus Gerdemann (GER)	RadioShack–Nissan	+ 28"
6	Rinaldo Nocentini (ITA)	Ag2r–La Mondiale	+ 29"
7	Tiago Machado (POR)	RadioShack–Nissan	+ 29"
8	Jon Izagirre (ESP)	Euskaltel–Euskadi	+ 29"
9	Alexandre Geniez (FRA)	Argos–Shimano	+ 29"
10	Rigoberto Urán (COL)	Team Sky	+ 29"

=== Stage 7 ===
16 July 2012 — Kraków to Kraków, 131.4 km (81.6 mi)

As was the case in the 2011 edition of the race, the final general classification battle was to come down to a final circuit race around Kraków. After a 15.8 km (9.8 mi) opening to the stage, the riders contested two 5 km (3.1 mi) loops around the town of Wieliczka; there was a further 19 km (11.8 mi) of racing before the riders entered the finishing circuit of 12.4 km (7.7 mi), to be completed on seven occasions. Each circuit had an intermediate sprint point on one of the laps, while there was only one categorised climb during the Wieliczka loop, 500 m (1,600 ft) before the end of the second lap. In the early kilometres, twelve riders representing twelve teams established the day's breakaway, including the winner of the third stage, Zdeněk Štybar of Omega Pharma–Quick-Step. The group managed to establish an advantage of around three minutes, but the peloton – being led by the Liquigas–Cannondale team, protecting the race leader Moreno Moser – were being attentive in light of the close margins in the general classification.

Bonus seconds on offer at the intermediate sprint points, but the breakaway took all the available points during the circuits, meaning that Moser could only be beaten at the stage finish. Saxo Bank–Tinkoff Bank's Jarosław Marycz and Team Sky rider Juan Antonio Flecha looked to break the lead group apart on the final lap, before Marycz attacked solo, but the group were eventually brought back by the peloton with 3 km (1.9 mi) remaining. It was at this point that a torrential downpour hit the race, and made the sprint for the line treacherous. Argos–Shimano moved forward in the peloton for their sprinter John Degenkolb, and Degenkolb managed to hold off the advances of Team Sky duo Mathew Hayman and Ben Swift to take the victory, his sixth of the season. Moser finished in the pack to secure the general classification by five seconds ahead of Štybar's teammate Michał Kwiatkowski.

Stage 7 Result

	Rider	Team	Time
1	John Degenkolb (GER)	Argos–Shimano	2h 50' 32"
2	Mathew Hayman (AUS)	Team Sky	s.t.
3	Ben Swift (GBR)	Team Sky	s.t.
4	Jacopo Guarnieri (ITA)	Astana	s.t.
5	Tosh Van der Sande (BEL)	Lotto–Belisol	s.t.
6	Theo Bos (NED)	Rabobank	s.t.
7	Aidis Kruopis (LTU)	Orica–GreenEDGE	s.t.
8	Filippo Fortin (ITA)	Team Type 1–Sanofi	s.t.
9	Lucas Sebastián Haedo (ARG)	Saxo Bank–Tinkoff Bank	s.t.
10	Manuel Belletti (ITA)	Ag2r–La Mondiale	s.t.

Final General Classification

	Rider	Team	Time
1	Moreno Moser (ITA)	Liquigas–Cannondale	30h 15' 49"
2	Michał Kwiatkowski (POL)	Omega Pharma–Quick-Step	+ 5"
3	Sergio Henao (COL)	Team Sky	+ 16"
4	Alexandr Kolobnev (RUS)	Team Katusha	+ 25"
5	Linus Gerdemann (GER)	RadioShack–Nissan	+ 28"
6	Rinaldo Nocentini (ITA)	Ag2r–La Mondiale	+ 29"
7	Jon Izagirre (ESP)	Euskaltel–Euskadi	+ 29"
8	Tiago Machado (POR)	RadioShack–Nissan	+ 29"
9	Alexandre Geniez (FRA)	Argos–Shimano	+ 29"
10	Rigoberto Urán (COL)	Team Sky	+ 29"

== Classification leadership table ==
In the 2012 Tour de Pologne, four different jerseys were awarded. For the general classification, calculated by adding each cyclist's finishing times on each stage, and allowing time bonuses in intermediate sprints and at the finish in mass-start stages, the leader received a yellow jersey. This classification was considered the most important of the 2012 Tour de Pologne, and the winner of the classification is the winner of the race.

There was also a mountains classification, the leadership of which was marked by a fuchsia jersey, representing the Tauron Group, the sponsors of the classification. In the mountains classification, points were won by reaching the top of a climb before other cyclists, with more points available for the higher-categorised climbs, which were split into three distinctive categories. Double points were awarded for the final climb of the race, on the penultimate stage. The third jersey represented the points classification, marked by a white-and-red jersey. In the points classification, cyclists got points for finishing in the top 20 in a stage. For all stages, the win earned 20 points, second place earned 19 points, third 18, and one point fewer per place down to a single point for 20th.

The fourth jersey represented the sprints classification, marked by a red jersey. In the sprints classification, cyclists received points for finishing in the top 3 at intermediate sprint points during each stage, with the exception of the individual time trial stages. There was also a classification for teams, in which the times of the best three cyclists per team on each stage were added together; the leading team at the end of the race was the team with the lowest total time.

Stage	Winner	General Classification	Mountains Classification	Points Classification	Intermediate Sprints Classification	Team Classification
1	Moreno Moser	Moreno Moser	Daniel Teklehaymanot	Moreno Moser	Sylvain Georges	Team Sky
2	Ben Swift	Moreno Moser	Daniel Teklehaymanot	Fabian Wegmann	Łukasz Bodnar	Team Sky
3	Zdeněk Štybar	Moreno Moser	Daniel Teklehaymanot	Moreno Moser	Łukasz Bodnar	Team Sky
4	Aidis Kruopis	Michał Kwiatkowski	Daniel Teklehaymanot	Ben Swift	Adrian Kurek	Team Sky
5	Ben Swift	Michał Kwiatkowski	Daniel Teklehaymanot	Ben Swift	Adrian Kurek	Team Sky
6	Moreno Moser	Moreno Moser	Tomasz Marczyński	Michał Kwiatkowski	Adrian Kurek	Team Sky
7	John Degenkolb	Moreno Moser	Tomasz Marczyński	Ben Swift	Adrian Kurek	Team Sky
Final		Moreno Moser	Tomasz Marczyński	Ben Swift	Adrian Kurek	Team Sky

Notes

- In stages 2 and 4, Michał Kwiatkowski, who was second in the points classification, wore the white jersey, because Moreno Moser (in first place) wore the yellow jersey as leader of the general classification during that stage.
