= 2016 Trofeo Laigueglia =

Race details
- Dates: February 14, 2016
- Stages: 1
- Distance: 192.5 km (119.6 mi)
- Winning time: 5h 00' 55"

Results
	Winner	Andrea Fedi (ITA)	(Southeast–Venezuela)
	Second	Sonny Colbrelli (ITA)	(Bardiani–CSF)
	Third	Grega Bole (SLO)	(Nippo–Vini Fantini)

The 2016 Trofeo Laigueglia was a one-day road cycling race that took place on 14 February 2016 in and around Laigueglia. It was the 53rd edition of the Trofeo Laigueglia and was rated as a 1.HC event as part of the 2016 UCI Europe Tour. The champion of the 2015 Trofeo Laigueglia, Davide Cimolai, was not selected as part of the Lampre–Merida team.

The race was won by Andrea Fedi (Southeast–Venezuela). He broke away with a small group in the closing kilometres, then attacked on the final climbs. He held off a small chasing group to take a solo win, with Sonny Colbrelli (Bardiani–CSF) second and Grega Bole (Nippo–Vini Fantini) third. It was the first professional victory of Fedi's career.

== Teams ==
Eighteen teams were invited to take part in the race. Three of these were UCI WorldTeams; seven were UCI Professional Continental teams; seven were UCI Continental teams; the final team was an Italian national team.

UCI WorldTeams

- Lampre–Merida
- AG2R La Mondiale
- FDJ

UCI Professional Continental teams

- Bardiani–CSF
- Androni Giocattoli–Sidermec
- Nippo–Vini Fantini
- Gazprom–RusVelo
- Team Novo Nordisk
- Delko–Marseille Provence KTM
- Southeast–Venezuela

UCI Continental teams

- Team Roth
- GM Europa Ovini
- Norda–MG.K Vis Vega
- D'Amico–Bottecchia
- Amore & Vita–Selle SMP
- Unieuro–Wilier
- Christina Jewelry Pro Cycling

National teams

- Italy

== Result ==
Result (1–10)
Rank	Rider	Team	Time
1	Andrea Fedi (ITA)	Southeast–Venezuela	5h 00' 55"
2	Sonny Colbrelli (ITA)	Bardiani–CSF	+ 2"
3	Grega Bole (SLO)	Nippo–Vini Fantini	+ 2"
4	Fabio Felline (ITA)	Italy	+ 2"
5	Francesco Gavazzi (ITA)	Androni Giocattoli–Sidermec	+ 2"
6	Diego Ulissi (ITA)	Lampre–Merida	+ 2"
7	Arthur Vichot (FRA)	FDJ	+ 2"
8	Matteo Busato (ITA)	Southeast–Venezuela	+ 2"
9	Matteo Montaguti (ITA)	AG2R La Mondiale	+ 2"
10	Pierre Latour (FRA)	AG2R La Mondiale	+ 8"
