= Francesco Gavazzi =

Italian cyclist (born 1984)

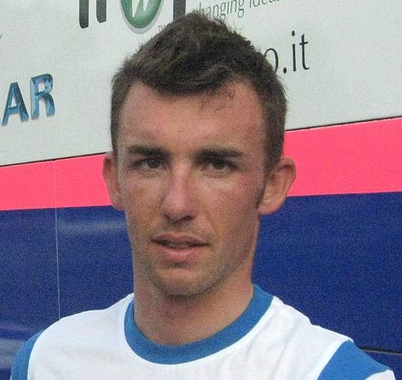
- Gavazzi at the 2009 Tour de Pologne

Personal information
- Full name: Francesco Gavazzi
- Nickname: Gava
- Born: 1 August 1984 (age 42) Morbegno, Italy
- Height: 1.72 m (5 ft 8 in)
- Weight: 62 kg (137 lb)

Cycling career
- Sport: Cycling
- Discipline: Road
- Role: Rider
- Rider type: Sprinter

Professional teams
- 2007–2011: Lampre–Fondital
- 2012–2014: Astana
- 2015: Southeast Pro Cycling
- 2016–2020: Androni Giocattoli–Sidermec
- 2021–2023: Eolo–Kometa

Major wins
- Grand Tours Vuelta a España 1 individual stage (2011) Other Trittico Lombardo (2010)

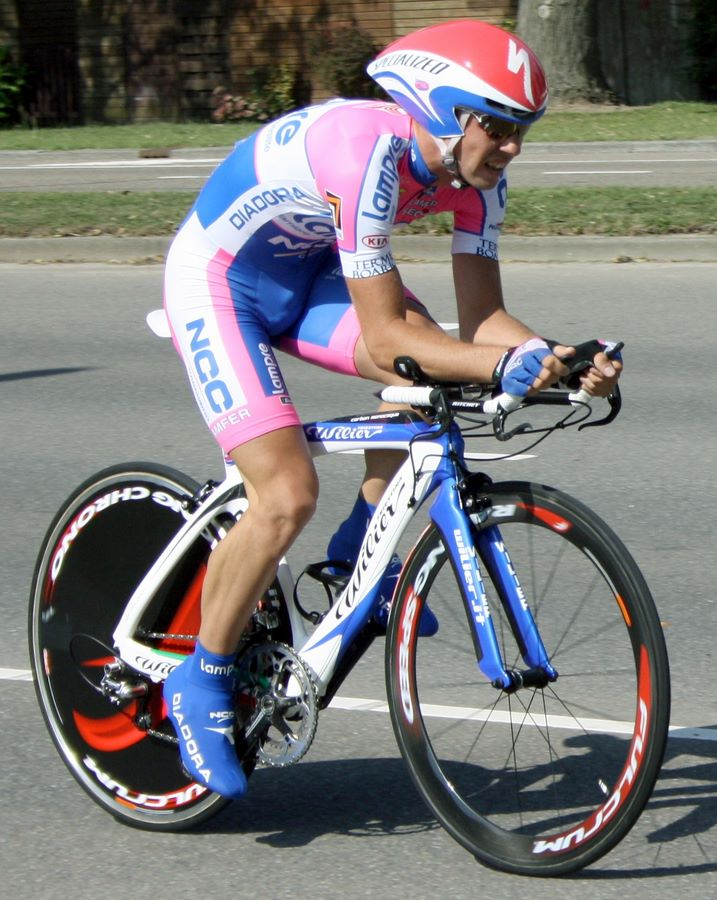
Gavazzi at the 2009 Eneco Tour

Francesco Gavazzi (born 1 August 1984) is an Italian former professional road bicycle racer, who competed as a professional from 2007 to 2023.

== Career ==
Gavazzi was born in Morbegno. In 2012, Gavazzi participated in the Tour of Beijing and won its queen stage leading to the Great Wall of China. To add to the difficulty of the day, the air quality was deemed as "severely polluted" by the local authorities. Gavazzi closed down an attack by Team Sky's Edvald Boasson Hagen and grabbed the victory. His consistent placings in the other stages netted him the second spot in the overall classification behind Tony Martin (Omega Pharma–Quick-Step). However the win in Beijing was Gavazzi's sole victory during three years at Astana, and in November 2014 it was announced that had signed a one-year deal with Southeast Pro Cycling for the 2015 season.

== Major results ==
2004
10th Trofeo Alcide Degasperi
2005
6th Trofeo Banca Popolare di Vicenza
2006
1st Road race, National Under-23 Road Championships
1st Overall Giro della Toscana
1st Trofeo Unidelta
1st Giro del Canavese
2nd GP Folignano
3rd Road race, UEC European Under-23 Road Championships
4th Road race, UCI Under-23 Road World Championships
5th Overall Girobio

1st Stage 4

5th Gran Premio Palio del Recioto
5th Trofeo Alcide Degasperi
6th Coppa della Pace
7th Trofeo Banca Popolare di Vicenza
2007
3rd Japan Cup
2008
5th Overall Tour de Pologne
5th Japan Cup
7th Gran Premio Nobili Rubinetterie
7th Memorial Marco Pantani
9th Memorial Cimurri
2009
1st Rund um die Nürnberger Altstadt
2nd Gran Premio Industria e Commercio di Prato
3rd Giro della Romagna
3rd Giro del Piemonte
4th Road race, National Road Championships
5th Giro di Toscana
6th Paris–Tours
10th Overall Tour de Pologne
10th Overall Eneco Tour
2010
1st Coppa Ugo Agostoni
1st Stage 1 Giro di Sardegna
1st Stage 3 Tour of the Basque Country
2nd Trofeo Laigueglia
6th Classica Sarda
8th Giro del Friuli
8th GP Ouest–France
9th Tre Valli Varesine
9th Giro della Romagna
9th Grand Prix Cycliste de Montréal
10th Overall Tirreno–Adriatico
2011
Volta a Portugal

1st Stages 6 & 10

1st Stage 18 Vuelta a España
1st Stage 5 Tour of the Basque Country
4th Classica Sarda
4th Gran Premio Nobili Rubinetterie
6th Overall Giro della Provincia di Reggio Calabria
8th Gran Premio della Costa Etruschi
2012
2nd Overall Tour of Beijing

1st Stage 3

5th Trofeo Laigueglia
5th Druivenkoers Overijse
7th Overall Tour Méditerranéen
2013
6th Overall Tour of Belgium
2014
3rd Trofeo Serra de Tramuntana
5th Trofeo Muro–Port d'Alcúdia
8th Grand Prix of Aargau Canton
10th Gran Premio Città di Camaiore
2015
2nd Trofeo Laigueglia
2nd Gran Premio di Lugano
4th Overall Tour of Hainan
10th Tre Valli Varesine
2016
1st Memorial Marco Pantani
1st Stage 2 Volta a Portugal
2nd Overall Sibiu Cycling Tour
2nd Gran Premio della Costa Etruschi
2nd Giro dell'Appennino
3rd Tre Valli Varesine
3rd Coppa Ugo Agostoni
5th Trofeo Laigueglia
5th GP Industria & Artigianato di Larciano
7th Overall Tour du Haut Var
8th Overall Tour du Limousin
8th Coppa Sabatini
9th Overall Tour La Provence
10th Trofeo Matteotti
10th Gran Premio Bruno Beghelli
2017
3rd Overall Tour du Limousin
3rd Gran Premio della Costa Etruschi
3rd Classic Sud-Ardèche
3rd Coppa Ugo Agostoni
3rd Coppa Sabatini
6th La Drôme Classic
6th Trofeo Laigueglia
7th Overall Tour of Turkey
7th GP Industria & Artigianato di Larciano
7th Memorial Marco Pantani
2018
1st Stage 1 Vuelta a Burgos
2nd Grand Prix of Aargau Canton
3rd Memorial Marco Pantani
4th Giro dell'Appennino
5th Overall Tour du Limousin
5th Trofeo Laigueglia
6th Coppa Sabatini
9th GP Industria & Artigianato di Larciano
10th Coppa Ugo Agostoni
2019
1st Stage 4 Tour du Limousin
4th Trofeo Laigueglia
7th Memorial Marco Pantani
9th Giro dell'Appennino

=== Grand Tour general classification results timeline ===
Grand Tour	2008	2009	2010	2011	2012	2013	2014	2015	2016	2017	2018	2019	2020	2021	2022	2023
Giro d'Italia	84	69	—	—	—	—	—	58	—	—	53	58	—	29	67	67
Tour de France	—	—	105	—	—	84	—	—	—	—	—	—	—	—	—	
Vuelta a España	—	—	—	58	—	—	—	—	—	—	—	—	—	—	—	

Legend
—	Did not compete
DNF	Did not finish
