= Simone Velasco =

Italian bicycle racer

- Velasco in 2026

Personal information
- Born: 2 December 1995 (age 30) Bologna, Italy
- Height: 1.7 m (5 ft 7 in)
- Weight: 59 kg (130 lb)

Cycling career
- Sport: Cycling
- Current team: XDS Astana Team
- Discipline: Road
- Role: Rider

Amateur team
- 2014–2015: Zalf–Euromobil–Désirée–Fior

Professional teams
- 2016–2017: Bardiani–CSF
- 2018–2019: Wilier Triestina–Selle Italia
- 2020–2021: Gazprom–RusVelo
- 2022–: Astana Qazaqstan Team

Major wins
- One-day races and Classics National Road Race Championships (2023) Trofeo Laigueglia (2019)

Simone Velasco (born 2 December 1995 in Bologna) is an Italian cyclist, who currently rides for UCI WorldTeam XDS Astana Team.

== Major results ==
=== Gravel ===
7th UCI World Championships

=== Road ===
2013
1st Trofeo Città di Loano
1st GP dell'Arno
2nd Trofeo Dorigo Porte
5th Overall Giro della Lunigiana
2014
2nd Trofeo Edil C
2015
1st Coppa della Pace
1st Ruota d'Oro
2nd Gran Premio di Poggiana
2nd GP Capodarco
4th Overall Giro della Regione Friuli Venezia Giulia
8th Trofeo Città di San Vendemiano
2017
9th Trofeo Matteotti
2018
5th Trofeo Matteotti
7th Overall Tour of Hainan
10th Gran Piemonte
2019 (2 pro wins)
1st Trofeo Laigueglia
1st Stage 3 Settimana Internazionale di Coppi e Bartali
3rd Coppa Sabatini
8th Gran Premio di Lugano
10th Giro dell'Appennino
10th Memorial Marco Pantani
2020
4th Trofeo Matteotti
7th Memorial Marco Pantani
2021 (1)
2nd Tour du Jura
4th Giro dell'Appennino
4th Coppa Ugo Agostoni
6th Overall Tour du Limousin

1st Stage 3

6th Overall Giro di Sicilia
6th Gran Premio di Lugano
9th Overall Czech Cycling Tour
9th Giro del Veneto
2022
7th Coppa Sabatini
2023 (2)
National Championships

1st Road race
4th Time trial

1st Stage 3 Volta a la Comunitat Valenciana
2nd Trofeo Matteotti
3rd Circuito de Getxo
5th Overall Vuelta a Castilla y León
5th Grand Prix Cycliste de Montréal
10th Memorial Marco Pantani
2024
2nd Giro dell'Appennino
3rd Figueira Champions Classic
5th GP Industria & Artigianato di Larciano
8th Trofeo Laigueglia
2025
3rd Coppa Agostoni
4th Liège–Bastogne–Liège
5th Overall Settimana Internazionale di Coppi e Bartali
7th Trofeo Calvià
8th Overall Tour of the Basque Country
8th GP Miguel Induráin
9th GP Industria & Artigianato di Larciano
2026
6th Trofeo Matteotti
8th Coppa Agostoni
10th Giro del Veneto

==== Grand Tour general classification results timeline ====
Grand Tour	2022	2023	2024	2025
Giro d'Italia	—	26	32	—
Tour de France	31	—	—	
Vuelta a España	—	—	—	

Legend
—	Did not compete
DNF	Did not finish
