= Matteo Busato =

Italian cyclist

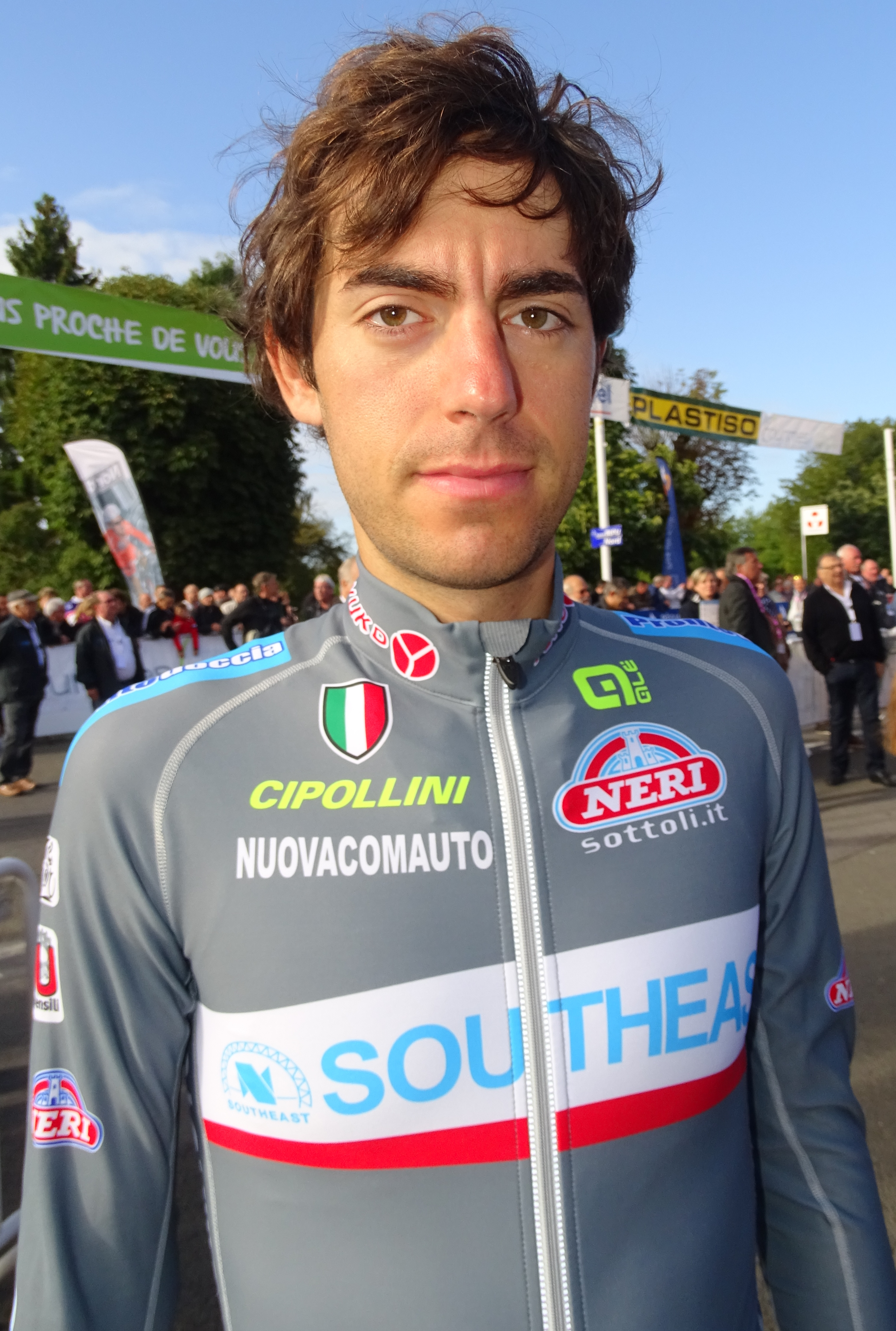
- Busato in 2015

Personal information
- Born: 20 December 1987 (age 38) Veneto, Italy
- Height: 1.79 m (5 ft 10 in)
- Weight: 67 kg (148 lb)

Cycling career
- Sport: Cycling
- Discipline: Road
- Role: Rider
- Rider type: One day races

Amateur teams
- 2007–2009: Fausto Coppi Gazzera
- 2010–2011: Zalf Désirée Fior
- 2013: U.C. Trevigiani–Dynamon–Bottoli

Professional teams
- 2012: Team Idea
- 2014: MG Kvis–Trevigiani
- 2015–2018: Southeast Pro Cycling
- 2019: Androni Giocattoli–Sidermec
- 2020: Vini Zabù–KTM

Matteo Busato (born 20 December 1987) is an Italian racing cyclist, who most recently rode for UCI ProTeam Vini Zabù–Brado–KTM. He rode at the 2014 UCI Road World Championships.

== Major results ==
2008
10th ZLM Tour
2009
7th Trofeo Zsšdi
9th Coppa della Pace
9th Giro del Medio Brenta
10th Overall Girobio
2010
2nd Trofeo Edil C
3rd Overall Giro della Regione Friuli Venezia Giulia
6th Coppa della Pace
6th Trofeo Gianfranco Bianchin
9th Ruota d'Oro
2011
1st Overall Giro della Regione Friuli Venezia Giulia
8th Trofeo Alcide Degasperi
9th Overall Girobio
2012
1st Giro del Medio Brenta
3rd Trofeo Edil C
3rd Gran Premio Industrie del Marmo
7th Trofeo Alcide Degasperi
2013
1st GP Capodarco
2014
1st Overall Kreiz Breizh Elites
5th Overall Sibiu Cycling Tour
5th Overall Giro della Regione Friuli Venezia Giulia
8th Circuito de Getxo
10th Tour de Berne
10th GP Industria & Artigianato di Larciano
2015
6th Overall Tour of Qinghai Lake
2016
2nd Memorial Marco Pantani
5th Giro dell'Appennino
7th Overall Settimana Internazionale di Coppi e Bartali
7th Gran Premio della Costa Etruschi
8th Trofeo Laigueglia
9th Coppa Ugo Agostoni
2017
8th Giro dell'Appennino
2018
3rd Overall Tour de Korea
3rd Trofeo Laigueglia
2019
3rd Overall Tour de la Mirabelle
9th La Drôme Classic

=== Grand Tour general classification results timeline ===
| Grand Tour | 2015 | 2016 | 2017 |
|---|---|---|---|
| Giro d'Italia | 106 | 57 | 84 |
| Tour de France | — | — | — |
| Vuelta a España | — | — | — |

Legend
| — | Did not compete |
| DNF | Did not finish |
