= 2014 GP Ouest-France =

2014 UCI World Tour, race 24 of 29

Race details
- Dates: 31 August 2014
- Stages: 1
- Distance: 229.1 km (142.4 mi)
- Winning time: 5h 38' 26"

Results
	Winner	Sylvain Chavanel (FRA)	(IAM Cycling)
	Second	Andrea Fedi (ITA)	(Neri Sottoli)
	Third	Arthur Vichot (FRA)	(FDJ.fr)

The 2014 GP Ouest-France was the 78th edition of the GP Ouest-France, a single-day cycling race. It was held on 31 August 2014, over a distance of 229.1 km (142.4 mi), starting and finishing in Plouay, France. It was the twenty-fourth race of the 2014 UCI World Tour season.

The race was won in the sprint by Sylvain Chavanel ahead of Andrea Fedi and Arthur Vichot, who completed the podium.

== Teams ==
As the GP Ouest–France was a UCI World Tour event, all 18 UCI ProTeams were invited automatically and obligated to send a squad. Six UCI Professional Continental teams also competed in the race, and as such, forming the event's 24-team peloton.

The 24 teams that competed in the race were:

- Ag2r–La Mondiale
- Astana
- Bardiani–CSF
- Belkin Pro Cycling
- BMC Racing Team
- Bretagne–Séché Environnement
- Cannondale
- Cofidis
- Team Europcar
- FDJ.fr
- Garmin–Sharp
- Giant–Shimano
- IAM Cycling
- Team Katusha
- Lampre–Merida
- Lotto–Belisol
- Movistar Team
- Neri Sottoli
- Omega Pharma–Quick-Step
- Orica–GreenEDGE
- Team Sky
- Tinkoff–Saxo
- Trek Factory Racing
- Wanty–Groupe Gobert

== Results ==
	Cyclist	Team	Time	UCI World Tour Points
1	Sylvain Chavanel (FRA)	IAM Cycling	5h 38' 26"	—N/a (Note: As Chavanel rides for IAM Cycling, which is not a World Tour team, he was ineligible to score points towards the UCI World Tour standings.)
2	Andrea Fedi (ITA)	Neri Sottoli	+ 0"	—N/a (Note: As Fedi rides for Neri Sottoli, which is not a World Tour team, he was ineligible to score points towards the UCI World Tour standings.)
3	Arthur Vichot (FRA)	FDJ.fr	+ 0"	50
4	Cyril Gautier (FRA)	Team Europcar	+ 0"	40
5	Julian Alaphilippe (FRA)	Omega Pharma–Quick-Step	+ 0"	30
6	Tim Wellens (BEL)	Lotto–Belisol	+ 0"	22
7	Ben Hermans (BEL)	BMC Racing Team	+ 0"	14
8	Alexander Kristoff (NOR)	Team Katusha	+ 2"	10
9	Giacomo Nizzolo (ITA)	Trek Factory Racing	+ 2"	6
10	Jürgen Roelandts (BEL)	Lotto–Belisol	+ 2"	2
