= 2019 Trofeo Laigueglia =

2019 UCI Europe Tour

Race details
- Dates: 17 February 2019
- Stages: 1
- Distance: 203.7 km (126.6 mi)
- Winning time: 5h 10' 21"

Results
	Winner	Simone Velasco (ITA)	(Neri Sottoli–Selle Italia–KTM)
	Second	Nicola Bagioli (ITA)	(Nippo–Vini Fantini–Faizanè)
	Third	Matteo Sobrero (ITA)	(Italy)

The 2019 Trofeo Laigueglia was a one-day road cycling race that took place on 17 February 2019 in and around Laigueglia. It was the 56th edition of the Trofeo Laigueglia and was rated as a 1.HC event as part of the 2019 UCI Europe Tour.

The race was won by Simone Velasco (Neri Sottoli–Selle Italia–KTM).

== Teams ==
Twenty teams of up to seven riders started the race:

UCI WorldTeams

- AG2R La Mondiale
- Groupama–FDJ

UCI Professional Continental Teams

- Androni Giocattoli–Sidermec
- Arkéa–Samsic
- Bardiani–CSF
- Gazprom–RusVelo
- Israel Cycling Academy
- Neri Sottoli–Selle Italia–KTM
- Nippo–Vini Fantini–Faizanè
- Riwal Readynez

UCI Continental Teams

- Amore & Vita–Prodir
- Beltrami Petroli Firenze–Hoppla
- Biesse–Carrera
- Cycling Team Friuli
- D'Amico–UM Tools
- Giotti Victoria–Palomar
- Iseo Rime Carnovali
- Sangemini–Trevigiani–Mg.K Vis
- Team Colpack

National Teams

- Italy

== Result ==
Result
Rank	Rider	Team	Time
1	Simone Velasco (ITA)	Neri Sottoli–Selle Italia–KTM	5h 10' 21"
2	Nicola Bagioli (ITA)	Nippo–Vini Fantini–Faizanè	+ 42"
3	Matteo Sobrero (ITA)	Italy	+ 42"
4	Francesco Gavazzi (ITA)	Androni Giocattoli–Sidermec	+ 42"
5	Nans Peters (FRA)	AG2R La Mondiale	+ 42"
6	Giulio Ciccone (ITA)	Italy	+ 42"
7	Kilian Frankiny (SUI)	Groupama–FDJ	+ 42"
8	Ildar Arslanov (RUS)	Gazprom–RusVelo	+ 42"
9	François Bidard (FRA)	AG2R La Mondiale	+ 42"
10	Davide Cimolai (ITA)	Israel Cycling Academy	+ 1' 18"
