= Andrea Fedi =

Italian cyclist

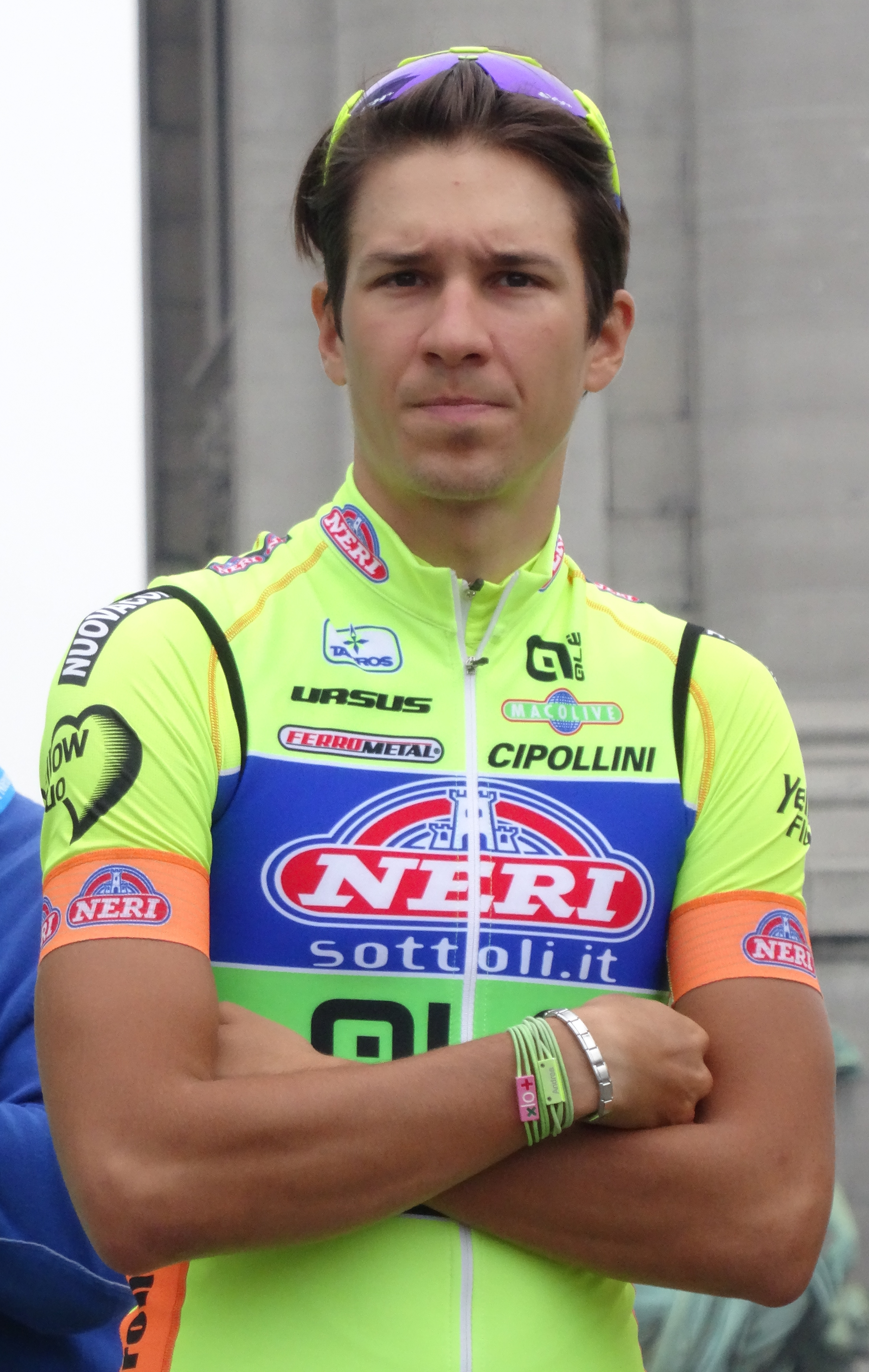
- Fedi in 2014

Personal information
- Full name: Andrea Fedi
- Born: 29 May 1991 (age 35) Prato, Italy

Cycling career
- Sport: Cycling
- Current team: Retired
- Discipline: Road
- Role: Rider

Amateur teams
- 2010–2011: Hoppla–Magis–Mavo Infissi
- 2012: Simaf Carrier Wega Truck Italia Valdarno

Professional teams
- 2013: Ceramica Flaminia–Fondriest
- 2014–2017: Yellow Fluo

Major wins
- One-day races and Classics Trofeo Laigueglia (2016)

Andrea Fedi (born 29 May 1991) is an Italian former racing cyclist, who rode professionally between 2013 and 2017 for the Ceramica Flaminia–Fondriest and Wilier Triestina–Selle Italia teams.

== Major results ==
2009
3rd Road race, National Junior Road Championships
2011
1st Trofeo Nesti e Nelli
1st Coppa 29 Martiri di Figline di Prato
2nd Trofeo Frasconi Fosco
3rd Road race, National Under-23 Road Championships
3rd La Popolarissima
5th GP Industria del Cuoio e delle Pelli
2012
1st Trofeo Tosco-Umbro
1st Coppa Città di San Daniele
2nd Coppa Fiera Mercatale
2nd Gran Premio della Liberazione
2nd Coppa 29 Martiri di Figline di Prato
3rd Memorial Angelo Fumagalli
3rd Ruota d'Oro
4th Giro del Belvedere
6th Trofeo Gianfranco Bianchin
2013
1st Stage 3 Okolo Slovenska
2nd Trofeo Città di Castelfidardo
5th GP Industria & Artigianato di Larciano
9th Grand Prix Südkärnten
10th Raiffeisen Grand Prix
2014
2nd GP Ouest–France
5th Coppa Ugo Agostoni
6th Dwars door Drenthe
8th GP Industria & Artigianato di Larciano
2015
2nd Giro dell'Emilia
5th Coppa Sabatini
7th Brussels Cycling Classic
9th Gran Piemonte
2016
1st Trofeo Laigueglia
2nd GP Industria & Artigianato di Larciano
4th Gran Premio della Costa Etruschi
7th Coppa Ugo Agostoni
