= 2018 Trofeo Laigueglia =

2018 UCI Europe Tour

Race details
- Dates: 11 February 2018
- Stages: 1
- Distance: 203.7 km (126.6 mi)
- Winning time: 5h 10' 50"

Results
	Winner	Moreno Moser (Italy)	(Italy (national team))
	Second	Paolo Totò (Italy)	(Sangemini–MG.K Vis Vega)
	Third	Matteo Busato (Italy)	(Wilier Triestina–Selle Italia)

The 2018 Trofeo Laigueglia was a one-day road cycling race that took place on 11 February 2018 in and around Laigueglia, Italy. It was the 55th edition of the Trofeo Laigueglia and was rated as a 1.HC event as part of the 2018 UCI Europe Tour.

The race was won by Moreno Moser, riding for an Italian national team select, accelerating 100 metres from the summit of the climb through the hilltop village of Colla Micheri to open a decisive gap. Second place went to Paolo Totò for the Sangemini–MG.K Vis Vega team, ahead of Wilier Triestina–Selle Italia's Matteo Busato.

== Teams ==
Twenty-two teams were invited to take part in the race. These included one UCI WorldTeam, thirteen UCI Professional Continental teams, seven UCI Continental teams and an Italian national team.

UCI WorldTeams

- AG2R La Mondiale

UCI Professional Continental Teams

- Aqua Blue Sport
- Androni Giocattoli–Sidermec
- Bardiani–CSF
- CCC–Sprandi–Polkowice
- Delko–Marseille Provence KTM
- Gazprom–RusVelo
- Israel Cycling Academy
- Nippo–Vini Fantini–Europa Ovini
- Fortuneo–Samsic
- Vérandas Willems–Crelan
- WB Aqua Protect Veranclassic
- Wanty–Groupe Gobert
- Wilier Triestina–Selle Italia

UCI Continental Teams

- Amore & Vita–Prodir
- D'Amico Utensilnord
- Biesse–Carrera Gavardo
- Sangemini–MG.K Vis Vega
- MsTina–Focus
- Team Vorarlberg Santic
- Team Waoo

National team

- Italy

== Result ==
Result
Rank	Rider	Team	Time
1	Moreno Moser (ITA)	Italy (national team)	5h 10' 50"
2	Paolo Totò (ITA)	Sangemini–MG.K Vis Vega	+ 43"
3	Matteo Busato (ITA)	Wilier Triestina–Selle Italia	+ 43"
4	Nicola Bagioli (ITA)	Nippo–Vini Fantini–Europa Ovini	+ 43"
5	Francesco Gavazzi (ITA)	Androni Giocattoli–Sidermec	+ 43"
6	Kasper Asgreen (DEN)	Team Waoo	+ 43"
7	Romain Combaud (FRA)	Delko–Marseille Provence KTM	+ 43"
8	Roland Thalmann (SUI)	Team Vorarlberg Santic	+ 43"
9	Ben Hermans (BEL)	Israel Cycling Academy	+ 43"
10	Fausto Masnada (ITA)	Androni Giocattoli–Sidermec	+ 48"
