= Grega Bole =

Slovenian road bicycle racer

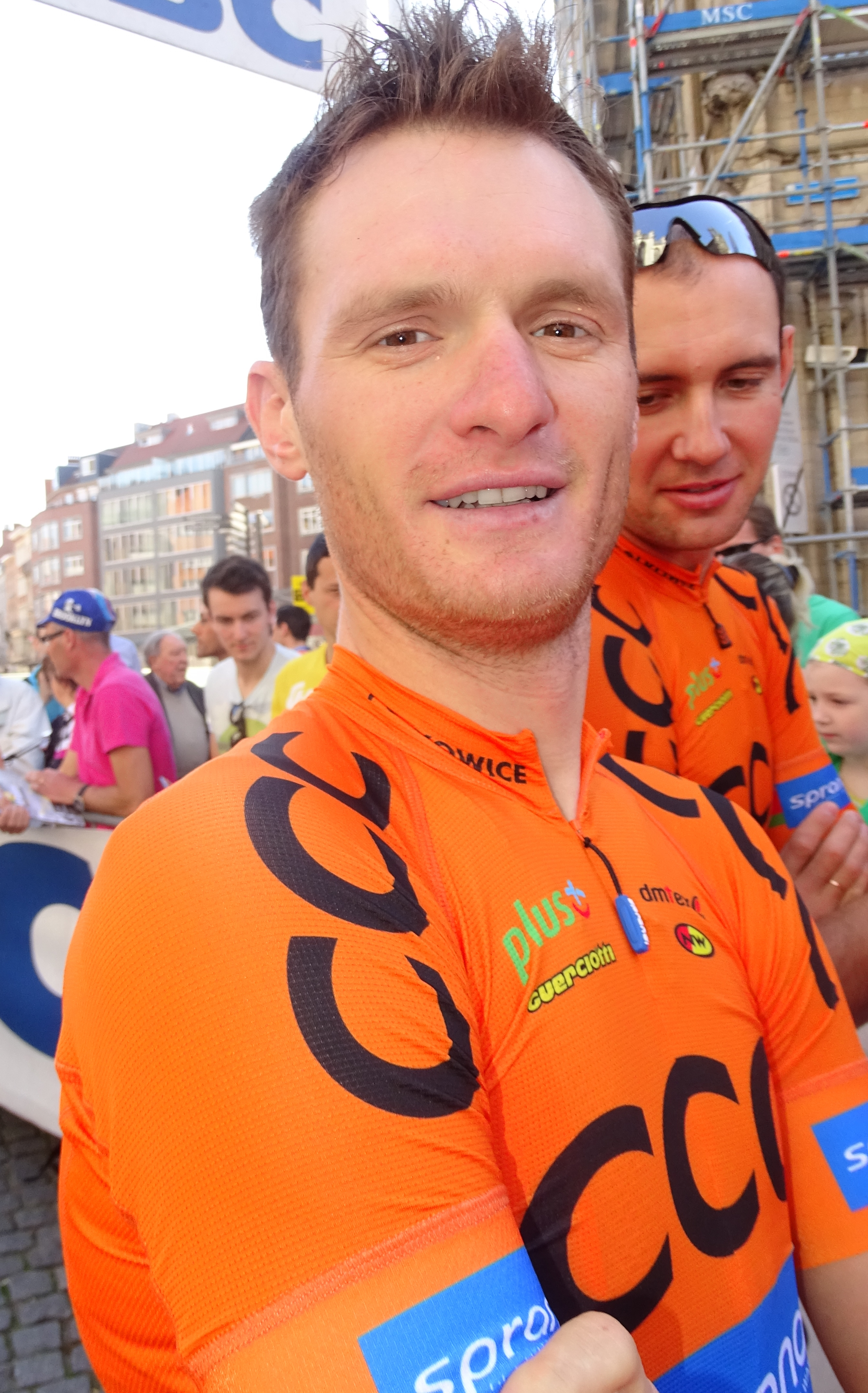
- Grega Bole at the 2015 Brabantse Pijl.

Personal information
- Full name: Grega Bole
- Born: 13 August 1985 (age 41): Jesenice, SR Slovenia, Yugoslavia; (now Slovenia)
- Height: 1.77 m (5 ft 9 1/2 in)
- Weight: 69 kg (152 lb)

Cycling career
- Sport: Cycling
- Discipline: Road
- Role: Rider

Amateur teams
- 2005–2007: Sava
- 2021–: Shabab Al Ahli Cycling Team

Professional teams
- 2008: Adria Mobil
- 2009: Amica Chips–Knauf
- 2010–2012: Lampre–Farnese Vini
- 2013: Vacansoleil–DCM
- 2014: Vini Fantini–Nippo
- 2015: CCC–Sprandi–Polkowice
- 2016: Nippo–Vini Fantini
- 2017–2020: Bahrain–Merida

Major wins
- One-day races and Classics National Road Race Championships (2011) GP Ouest–France (2011)

Grega Bole (born 13 August 1985 in Jesenice, Yugoslavia) is a Slovenian professional road bicycle racer, who most recently rode for UCI WorldTeam Bahrain–McLaren. His biggest victory is the 2011 GP Ouest–France, where he launched a solo attack with 2 kilometres (1.2 mi) to go. He held on as the field was closing in rapidly, with only Simon Gerrans who was second on the day being awarded the same time as Bole. In 2015, Bole was the victor of the first stage of the inaugural Tour of Croatia after negotiating a series of bends where two crashes occurred.

== Major results ==
2003
1st Overall Tour of Croatia Juniors

1st Stages 2 & 3

7th Road race, UCI Junior Road World Championships
2005
2nd Trofeo Banca Popolare di Vicenza
10th Overall Okolo Slovenska
2006
National Under-23 Road Championships

1st Road race
3rd Time trial

5th Overall Istrian Spring Trophy
5th Overall Giro delle Regioni
5th GP Kranj
8th Gran Premio della Liberazione
9th Overall The Paths of King Nikola

1st Stage 1

9th Overall Okolo Slovenska

1st Stage 2

2007
1st Liège–Bastogne–Liège Espoirs
Giro del Friuli-Venezia Giulia

1st Points classification
1st Stage 1

Giro delle Regioni

1st Points classification
1st Stage 2

2nd Overall Istrian Spring Trophy

1st Stage 1

2nd Trofeo Banca Popolare di Vicenza
2nd Poreč Trophy
10th Time trial, UEC European Under-23 Road Championships
2008 (1 pro win)
1st GP Kranj
2nd Overall Giro della Provincia di Grosseto
7th Overall Tour of Slovenia
7th Giro d'Oro
2009 (3)
1st Gran Premio Nobili Rubinetterie
1st Stage 3a Vuelta a Asturias
2nd Overall Tour of Hainan

1st Stage 7

2nd Giro del Friuli
3rd Ronde van Drenthe
3rd Prague–Karlovy Vary–Prague
5th GP Kranj
6th Overall Giro di Sardegna
8th Overall Giro della Provincia di Grosseto
9th Vuelta a La Rioja
2010 (3)
1st Stage 1 Critérium du Dauphiné
2nd Overall Tour de Pologne
9th Overall Tour of Slovenia

1st Stages 1 & 2

2011 (2)
1st Road race, National Road Championships
1st GP Ouest–France
6th Giro del Friuli
9th Vattenfall Cyclassics
2013 (1)
1st Stage 2 Tour de l'Ain
3rd Roma Maxima
2014 (4)
Tour of Qinghai Lake

1st Stages 6 & 10 (Note: Bole was promoted one position retroactively, after Ilya Davidenok's results were disqualified following his backdated two-year ban after testing positive for anabolic steroids.)

Tour de Korea

1st Sprints classification
1st Stage 1

1st Stage 1 Szlakiem Grodów Piastowskich
2nd Overall Circuit des Ardennes

1st Points classification
1st Stage 3

2nd Overall Tour of Japan

1st Points classification

2nd Giro dell'Appennino
2nd Coppa Ugo Agostoni
2nd Memorial Marco Pantani
3rd Japan Cup
2015 (1)
4th GP Ouest–France
5th Gran Premio Nobili Rubinetterie
5th Memorial Marco Pantani
7th Overall Dubai Tour
7th Trofeo Serra de Tramuntana
8th Clásica de Almería
10th Overall Tour of Croatia

1st Stage 1

2016 (2)
1st Overall Tour de Korea
1st Gran Premio della Costa Etruschi
3rd Trofeo Laigueglia
5th Coppa Ugo Agostoni
2017
2nd Road race, National Road Championships
2018 (2)
1st Mountains classification, Tour of Turkey
5th Overall Tour of Japan

1st Points classification
1st Stages 3 & 7

6th Eschborn–Frankfurt
2019
10th Eschborn–Frankfurt
2022
1st Overall Tour of Sharjah

1st Points classification
1st Stage 3

=== Grand Tour general classification results timeline ===
Grand Tour	2010	2011	2012	2013	2014	2015	2016	2017	2018	2019	2020
Giro d'Italia	—	—	—	DNF	—	61	135	—	—	110	—
Tour de France	125	127	DNF	—	—	—	—	143	—	—	—
Vuelta a España	97	—	—	97	—	—	—	—	—	—	DNF

Legend
—	Did not compete
DNF	Did not finish
