= Fabio Felline =

Italian road bicycle racer

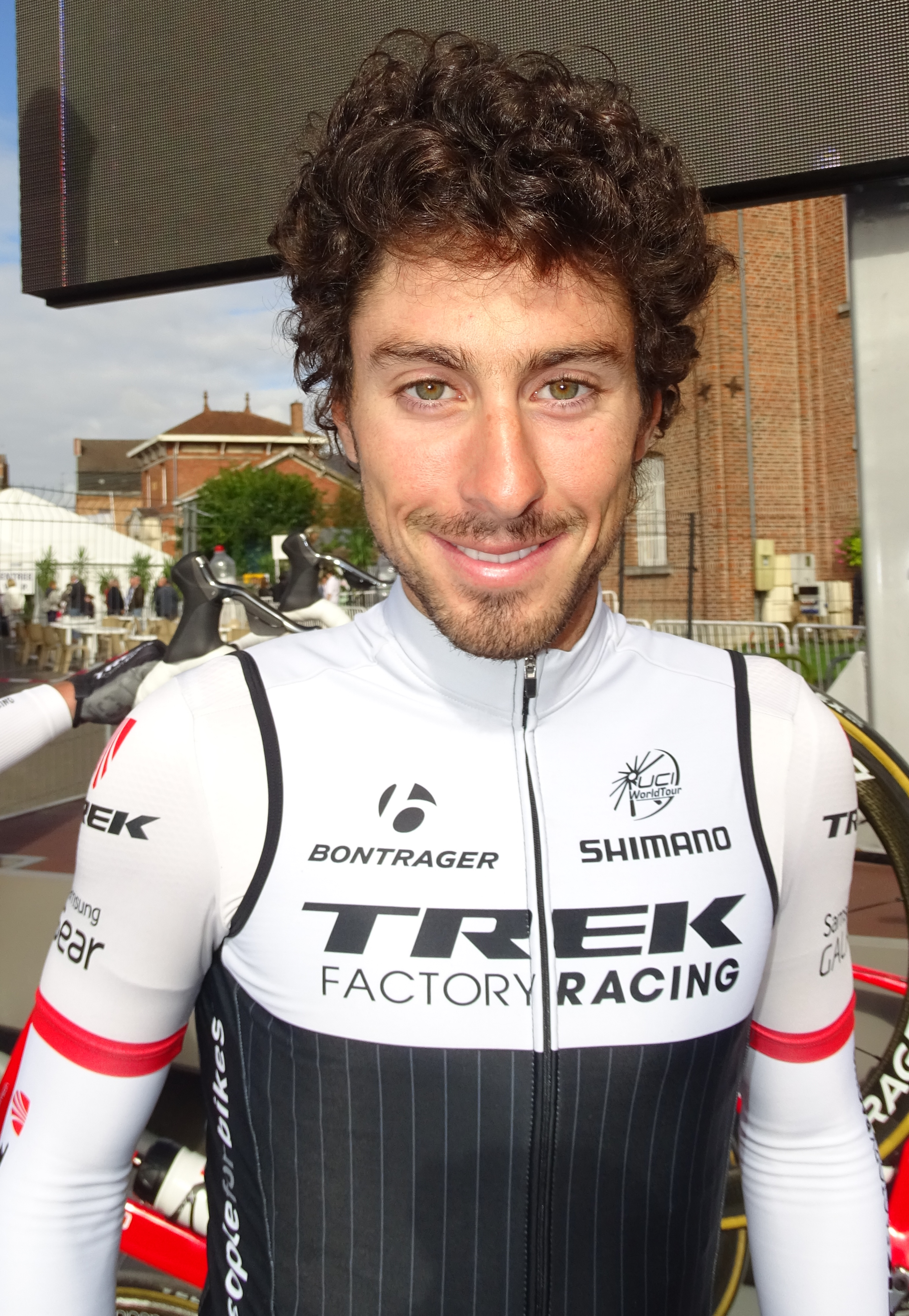
- Felline at the 2015 Grand Prix de Fourmies

Personal information
- Full name: Fabio Felline
- Born: 29 March 1990 (age 36) Turin, Italy
- Height: 1.75 m (5 ft 9 in)
- Weight: 65 kg (143 lb)

Cycling career
- Sport: Cycling
- Current team: Retired
- Discipline: Road
- Role: Rider
- Rider type: All-rounder; Classics specialist

Amateur team
- 2009: De Nardi Daigo Bergamasca

Professional teams
- 2010–2011: Footon–Servetto–Fuji
- 2012–2013: Androni Giocattoli–Venezuela
- 2014–2019: Trek Factory Racing
- 2020–2023: Astana
- 2024: Lidl–Trek

Major wins
- Grand Tours Vuelta a España Points classification (2016) One-Day Races and Classics Memorial Marco Pantani (2012, 2020) GP de Fourmies (2015) Trofeo Laigueglia (2017)

Fabio Felline (born 29 March 1990) is an Italian former road bicycle racer, who competed as a professional from 2010 to 2024.

== Career ==
Felline was born in Turin. In 2010, Felline took the start of his first Tour de France for Footon–Servetto–Fuji. He was the youngest competitor in that year's Tour. In 2012, Felline won a semi-classic in Italy, the Giro dell'Appennino. He got the best of the sprint of a group of 20 riders who survived several climbs disseminated on the parcours.

After two seasons with Androni Giocattoli–Venezuela, Felline left the team at the end of the 2013 season, to join Trek Factory Racing. At the end of March 2015, Felline won his first race with his new team, a short individual time trial at the Critérium International. In April, he won the second stage of the Tour of the Basque Country in a mass sprint ahead of Michael Matthews after a hilly day.

== Major results ==
2007
6th Overall Giro della Lunigiana
2008
3rd Time trial, National Junior Road Championships
7th Road race, UCI Juniors World Championships
2009
5th Giro del Belvedere
5th Giro del Medio Brenta
6th Trofeo Gianfranco Bianchin
7th Trofeo Banca Popolare di Vicenza
2010
1st Overall Circuit de Lorraine

1st Points classification
1st Young rider classification
1st Stages 2 & 3

5th Classica Sarda
10th E3 Prijs Vlaanderen
2011
1st Stage 2a Brixia Tour
6th Vuelta a La Rioja
7th Memorial Marco Pantani
9th Gran Premio Nobili Rubinetterie
2012
1st Giro dell'Appennino
1st Memorial Marco Pantani
2nd Gran Premio Bruno Beghelli
4th Gran Premio Industria e Commercio di Prato
9th Gran Premio di Lugano
2013
1st Stage 1a Settimana Internazionale di Coppi e Bartali
1st Stage 2 Tour of Slovenia
6th Gran Premio Nobili Rubinetterie
6th Circuito de Getxo
7th Memorial Marco Pantani
2014
6th Gran Premio Città di Camaiore
6th Gran Premio Nobili Rubinetterie
10th Overall Circuit de la Sarthe
2015
1st Grand Prix de Fourmies
1st Stage 2 Tour of the Basque Country
2nd La Drôme Classic
3rd Overall Critérium International

1st Points classification
1st Stage 2 (ITT)

3rd Classic Sud-Ardèche
4th Vuelta a Murcia
5th Overall Eneco Tour
5th Tre Valli Varesine
5th Trofeo Laigueglia
7th Classica Corsica
7th Brabantse Pijl
8th Strade Bianche
2016
1st Points classification Vuelta a España
2nd Overall Tour de Pologne
4th Trofeo Laigueglia
2017
1st Trofeo Laigueglia
2nd Time trial, National Road Championships
4th Overall Tour de Romandie

1st Prologue

4th Omloop Het Nieuwsblad
2018
3rd Time trial, National Road Championships
5th Overall Presidential Tour of Turkey
2019
9th Overall Étoile de Bessèges
2020
1st Memorial Marco Pantani
2021
9th Overall Okolo Slovenska

=== Grand Tour general classification results timeline ===
Grand Tour	2010	2011	2012	2013	2014	2015	2016	2017	2018	2019	2020	2021	2022	2023
Giro d'Italia	—	—	50	43	96	32	—	—	—	—	25	DNF	41	—
Tour de France	DNF	—	—	—	—	—	—	DNF	—	65	—	—	DNF	—
Vuelta a España	—	—	—	—	105	—	25	—	61	—	—	—	—	76

Legend
—	Did not compete
DNF	Did not finish
IP	Race in Progress
