= 2015 Trofeo Laigueglia =

2015 UCI Europe Tour
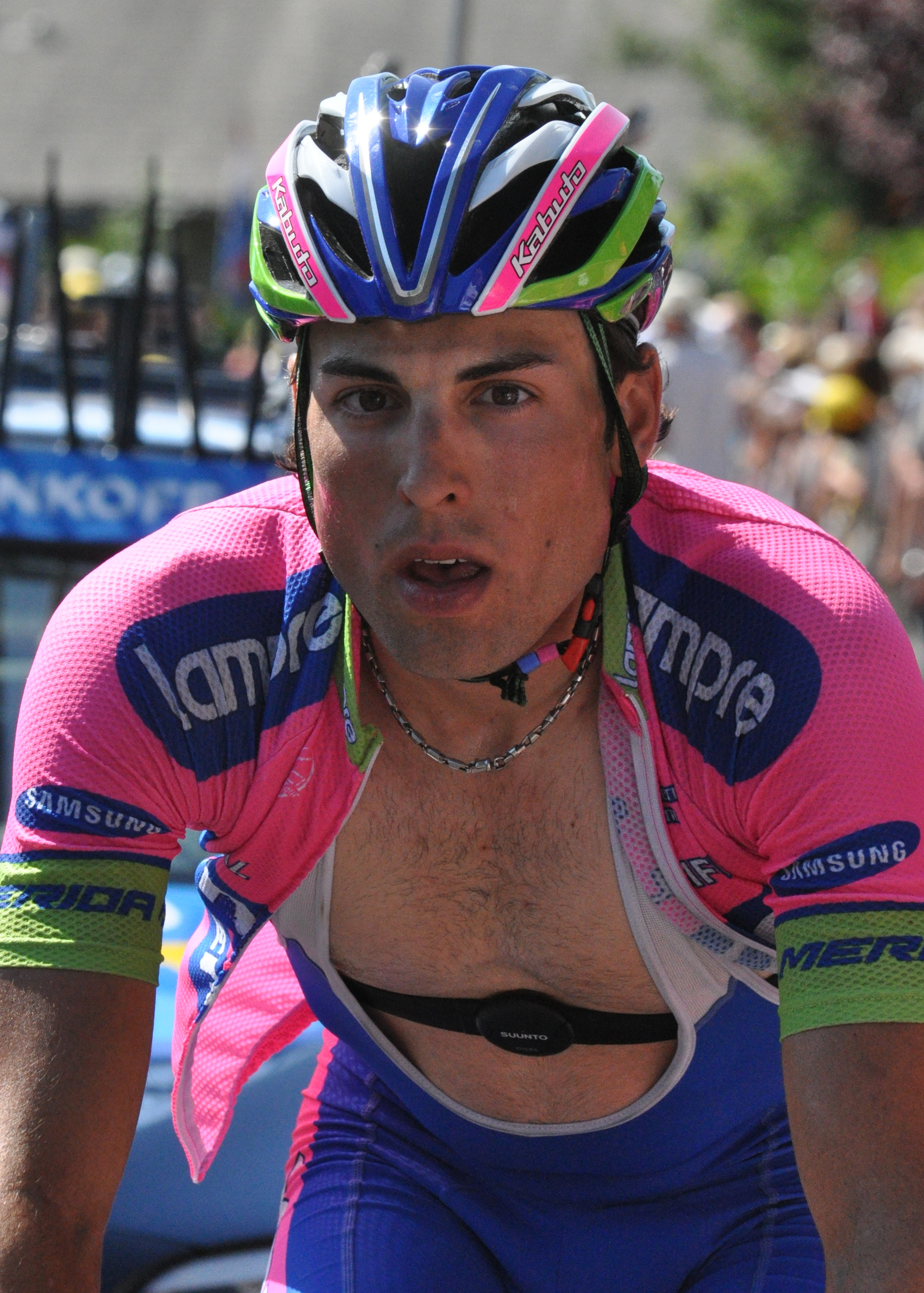
- Davide Cimolai, winner of the 2015 Trofeo Laigueglia

Race details
- Dates: 19 February 2015
- Stages: 1
- Distance: 191.8 km (119.2 mi)
- Winning time: 4h 53' 47"

Results
	Winner	Davide Cimolai (ITA)	(Lampre–Merida)
	Second	Francesco Gavazzi (ITA)	(Southeast Pro Cycling)
	Third	Alexey Tsatevich (RUS)	(Team Katusha)

The 2015 Trofeo Laigueglia was the 52nd edition of the Trofeo Laigueglia road cycling race. For the first time, the race was ranked as a 1.HC race by the UCI. It was part of the 2015 UCI Europe Tour and was held on 19 February 2015.

The 2014 champion was José Serpa (Lampre–Merida), but he was not selected to defend his title. Philippe Gilbert (BMC Racing Team) had intended to start the race, but a stomach illness caused his withdrawal. Favourites for victory in the race included Moreno Moser and Dan Martin (both Cannondale–Garmin), Oscar Gatto (Androni Giocattoli), Damiano Cunego (Nippo–Vini Fantini) and Fabio Felline (Italy).

The race was hilly throughout, with two difficult climbs in the final 10 kilometres (6 miles), including the difficult climb of Colla Micheri.

The race was won by Davide Cimolai (Lampre–Merida), from a 24-man sprint. This was the third year in a row that a Lampre cyclist had won the race, following Serpa in 2014 and Filippo Pozzato in 2013. It was Cimolai's first ever professional victory.

== Teams ==
20 teams were selected to take part, including five UCI WorldTeams.

- Lampre–Merida
- BMC Racing Team
- Cannondale–Garmin
- Team Katusha
- AG2R La Mondiale
- Androni Giocattoli
- Bardiani–CSF
- Bretagne–Séché Environnement
- Cult Energy Pro Cycling
- Colombia
- Italy (national team)
- Team Novo Nordisk
- Nippo–Vini Fantini
- Southeast Pro Cycling
- Team Europcar
- Team Idea 2010 ASD
- MG.K Vis–Vega
- Unieuro–Wilier
- GM Cycling Team
- D'Amico–Bottecchia

== Race summary ==
The field stayed together for the first 30 kilometres (19 miles), but a breakaway formed on the first climb of the day. Jonathan Paredes (Colombia), Nicola Gaffurini (MG.K Vis–Vega), Adriano Brogi (D'Amico–Bottecchia) and Jérôme Cousin (Team Europcar) built a lead that extended to approximately seven minutes. The breakaway was controlled by Lampre–Merida and the gap began to fall. Lampre–Merida were assisted by Cannondale–Garmin and Team Katusha. With 50 kilometres (31 miles) remaining, pressure from Cannondale–Garmin on one of the race's steep climbs split the peloton; the main group was reduced to 80 riders. Cousin held out alone at the head of the race, but was caught on the climb.

On the run in to the finish, Ilnur Zakarin (Team Katusha) attacked alone on the climb of Colla Micheri, but failed to establish a gap. He tried again on the final climb, Capo Mele, and was joined by Simone Stortoni (Androni Giocattoli) and Linus Gerdemann (Cult Energy Pro Cycling). Lampre–Merida, however, had several riders in the main group and were able to catch the breakaway and set up the sprint for Davide Cimolai. Aided in particular by Przemysław Niemiec, Cimolai won the race in a sprint ahead of Francesco Gavazzi (Southeast Pro Cycling) and Alexey Tsatevich (Team Katusha).

== Result ==
Result
Rank	Rider	Team	Time
1	Davide Cimolai (ITA)	Lampre–Merida	4h 53' 47"
2	Francesco Gavazzi (ITA)	Southeast Pro Cycling	+ 0"
3	Alexey Tsatevich (RUS)	Team Katusha	+ 0"
4	Matteo Montaguti (ITA)	AG2R La Mondiale	+ 0"
5	Fabio Felline (ITA)	Italy (national team)	+ 0"
6	Angelo Tulik (FRA)	Team Europcar	+ 0"
7	Brent Bookwalter (USA)	BMC Racing Team	+ 0"
8	Rasmus Guldhammer (DEN)	Cult Energy Pro Cycling	+ 0"
9	Simone Petilli (ITA)	Unieuro–Wilier	+ 0"
10	Javier Mejías (ESP)	Team Novo Nordisk	+ 0"
