= 2017 Trofeo Laigueglia =

2017 UCI Europe Tour

Race details
- Dates: 12 February 2017
- Stages: 1
- Distance: 192.5 km (119.6 mi)
- Winning time: 4h 54' 01"

Results
	Winner	Fabio Felline (Italy)	(Italy (national team))
	Second	Romain Hardy (France)	(Fortuneo–Vital Concept)
	Third	Mauro Finetto (Italy)	(Delko–Marseille Provence KTM)

The 2017 Trofeo Laigueglia was a one-day road cycling race that took place on 12 February 2017 in and around Laigueglia, Italy. It was the 54rd edition of the Trofeo Laigueglia and was rated as a 1.HC event as part of the 2017 UCI Europe Tour.

The race was won by Fabio Felline, riding for an Italian national team select, attacking the peloton with around 15 kilometres (9.3 miles) remaining, and soloing away to victory by 25 seconds from his closest competitor. Second place went to Romain Hardy for the Fortuneo–Vital Concept team, ahead of Delko–Marseille Provence KTM's Mauro Finetto.

== Teams ==
Twenty-three teams were invited to take part in the race. These included four UCI WorldTeams, twelve UCI Professional Continental teams, six UCI Continental teams and an Italian national team.

UCI WorldTeams

- AG2R La Mondiale
- Astana
- FDJ
- UAE Abu Dhabi

UCI Professional Continental Teams

- Aqua Blue Sport
- Bardiani–CSF
- Delko–Marseille Provence KTM
- Direct Énergie
- Gazprom–RusVelo
- Israel Cycling Academy
- Nippo–Vini Fantini
- Team Novo Nordisk
- WB Veranclassic Aqua Protect
- Wilier Triestina–Selle Italia
- Androni Giocattoli–Sidermec
- Fortuneo–Vital Concept

UCI Continental Teams

- Amore & Vita–Selle SMP
- D'Amico Utensilnord
- GM Europa Ovini
- Sangemini–MG.K Vis
- Tirol Cycling Team
- Unieuro Trevigiani–Hemus 1896

National teams

- Italy

== Result ==
Result
Rank	Rider	Team	Time
1	Fabio Felline (ITA)	Italy (national team)	4h 54' 01"
2	Romain Hardy (FRA)	Fortuneo–Vital Concept	+ 25"
3	Mauro Finetto (ITA)	Delko–Marseille Provence KTM	+ 25"
4	Matteo Trentin (ITA)	Italy (national team)	+ 25"
5	Cyril Gautier (FRA)	AG2R La Mondiale	+ 25"
6	Francesco Gavazzi (ITA)	Androni Giocattoli–Sidermec	+ 25"
7	Arthur Vichot (FRA)	FDJ	+ 25"
8	Matej Mohorič (SLO)	UAE Abu Dhabi	+ 25"
9	Mattia Cattaneo (ITA)	Androni Giocattoli–Sidermec	+ 25"
10	Romain Combaud (FRA)	Delko–Marseille Provence KTM	+ 29"
