= 2016 Gran Premio della Costa Etruschi =

Race details
- Dates: February 7, 2016
- Stages: 1
- Distance: 190.6 km (118.4 mi)
- Winning time: 4h 40' 36"

Results
	Winner	Grega Bole (SVN)	(Nippo)
	Second	Francesco Gavazzi (ITA)	(Androni)
	Third	Diego Ulissi (ITA)	(Lampre–M.)

The 2016 Gran Premio della Costa Etruschi cycling race took place on February 7, 2016, and was won by Nippo's Grega Bole. It was the 21st edition of the Gran Premio della Costa Etruschi race.

== General classification ==
Pos.	Cyclist	Squadra	Tempo
1	(Slovenia) Grega Bole	Nippo	4h40'36"
2	(Italy) Francesco Gavazzi	Androni	s.t.
3	(Italy) Diego Ulissi	Lampre–M.	s.t.
4	(Italy) Andrea Fedi	Southeast	s.t.
5	(Italy) Giulio Ciccone	Bardiani–CSF	s.t.
6	(Russia) Igor Boev	Gazprom-R.	s.t.
7	(Italy) Matteo Busato	Southeast	s.t.
8	(Italy) Edoardo Zardini	Bardiani–CSF	s.t.
9	(Germany) Stefan Schumacher	Christina J.	s.t.
10	(Austria) Stephan Rabitsch	Felbermayr	s.t.
