= Gran Premio della Costa Etruschi =

Italian one-day road cycling race

Gran Premio Costa degli Etruschi
Race details
- Date: Early February
- Region: Tuscany, Italy
- English name: Grand Prix of the Etruscan Coast
- Local name: GP Costa degli Etruschi (in Italian)
- Discipline: Road
- Competition: UCI Europe Tour
- Type: One-day
- Organiser: GS Emilia

History
- First edition: 1996
- Editions: 22 (as of 2017)
- First winner: Fabrizio Guidi (ITA)
- Most wins: Alessandro Petacchi (ITA) (6 wins)
- Most recent: Diego Ulissi (ITA)

The Gran Premio Costa degli Etruschi is a one-day professional cycling race between the towns of San Vincenzo and Donoratico on the Tuscany coast in Italy. The 193-kilometre-long race takes place at the beginning of February and has now taken over from the Trofeo Laigueglia as the opening event of the Italian professional cycling season. It is ranked 1.1 on the UCI Europe Tour. The race has been dominated by Italians since its inception in 1996, with riders from that nation winning on 17 occasions, with an all-Italian 1-2-3 happening 14 times out of the 21 editions of the race.

== History ==
The Gran Premio Costa Etruschi is a relatively new race by European cycling standards, coming into being in 1996. For the first six years of its existence, it only carried the grading of a national event and was not included on the UCI calendar, nor did it carry any ranking points. It was not until 2002 that it was included on the UCI calendar with a ranking of 1.3. Despite its lack of official status in its early days, the race always drew a top-class field composed of mostly Italian teams and continues to do so. The race came of age in 1998 when 25,000 people saw Tuscan sprinting ace Mario Cipollini win the race, the first of his two victories (he also won in 2000). Ukrainian rider Yuriy Metlushenko has also taken two victories in the event (in 2002 and 2004); however, the record for the most victories in the race stands with Alessandro Petacchi, who posted five victories in the six editions of the race between 2005 and 2010. His third victory in 2007 was his first pro victory in nine months after breaking his kneecap in the Giro d’Italia in May 2006.

The 2013 edition was originally cancelled due to financial problems; however, on 12 March 2013, during the presentation of the Settimana Internazionale Coppi e Bartali, the mayor of Castagneto Carducci announced that the Gran Premio Costa degli Etruschi would be raced on 21 September, as a preparation race for the 2013 UCI Road World Championships in Florence.

== The course ==
The race was originally over a distance of 153 kilometres, but this has increased over the years to its present length of around 190 km. The course is relatively level and definitely favours the sprinters. The first 30 kilometres are perfectly flat as the race leaves San Vincenzo and goes north along the coast to the town of Cecina. Here it swings inland and takes in two ascents of the modest 275 metre climb of the Guardistallo (the highest point of the course) after 39 and 79 kilometres. The second part of the race consists of two laps of a 24.3 kilometre circuit followed by five laps of a 10.15 kilometre circuit. Both these circuits are comparatively flat and are based around the finishing town of Donoratico, where the race finishes on the Via Aurelia.

== Past results ==
Year	Country	Rider	Team
1996	Italy	Fabrizio Guidi	Scrigno–Blue Storm
1997	Italy	Biagio Conte	Scrigno–Gaerne
1998	Italy	Mario Cipollini	Saeco–Cannondale
1999	Italy	Endrio Leoni	Liquigas
2000	Italy	Mario Cipollini	Saeco–Valli & Valli
2001	Italy	Fabio Sacchi	Saeco
2002	Ukraine	Yuri Metlushenko	Landbouwkrediet–Colnago
2003	Estonia	Jaan Kirsipuu	AG2R Prévoyance
2004	Ukraine	Yuri Metlushenko	Landbouwkrediet–Colnago
2005	Italy	Alessandro Petacchi	Fassa Bortolo
2006	Italy	Alessandro Petacchi	Team Milram
2007	Italy	Alessandro Petacchi	Team Milram
2008	Italy	Alessandro Petacchi	Team Milram
2009	Italy	Alessandro Petacchi	LPR Brakes–Farnese Vini
2010	Italy	Alessandro Petacchi	Lampre–Farnese Vini
2011	Italy	Elia Viviani	Liquigas–Cannondale
2012	Italy	Elia Viviani	Liquigas–Cannondale
2013	Italy	Michele Scarponi	Lampre–Merida
2014	Italy	Simone Ponzi	Yellow Fluo
2015	Italy	Manuel Belletti	Southeast Pro Cycling
2016	Slovenia	Grega Bole	Nippo–Vini Fantini
2017	Italy	Diego Ulissi	UAE Abu Dhabi

=== Winners by Nationality ===
# of Victories	Country
18	Italy
2	Ukraine
1	Estonia, Slovenia
