= Moreno Moser =

Italian cyclist

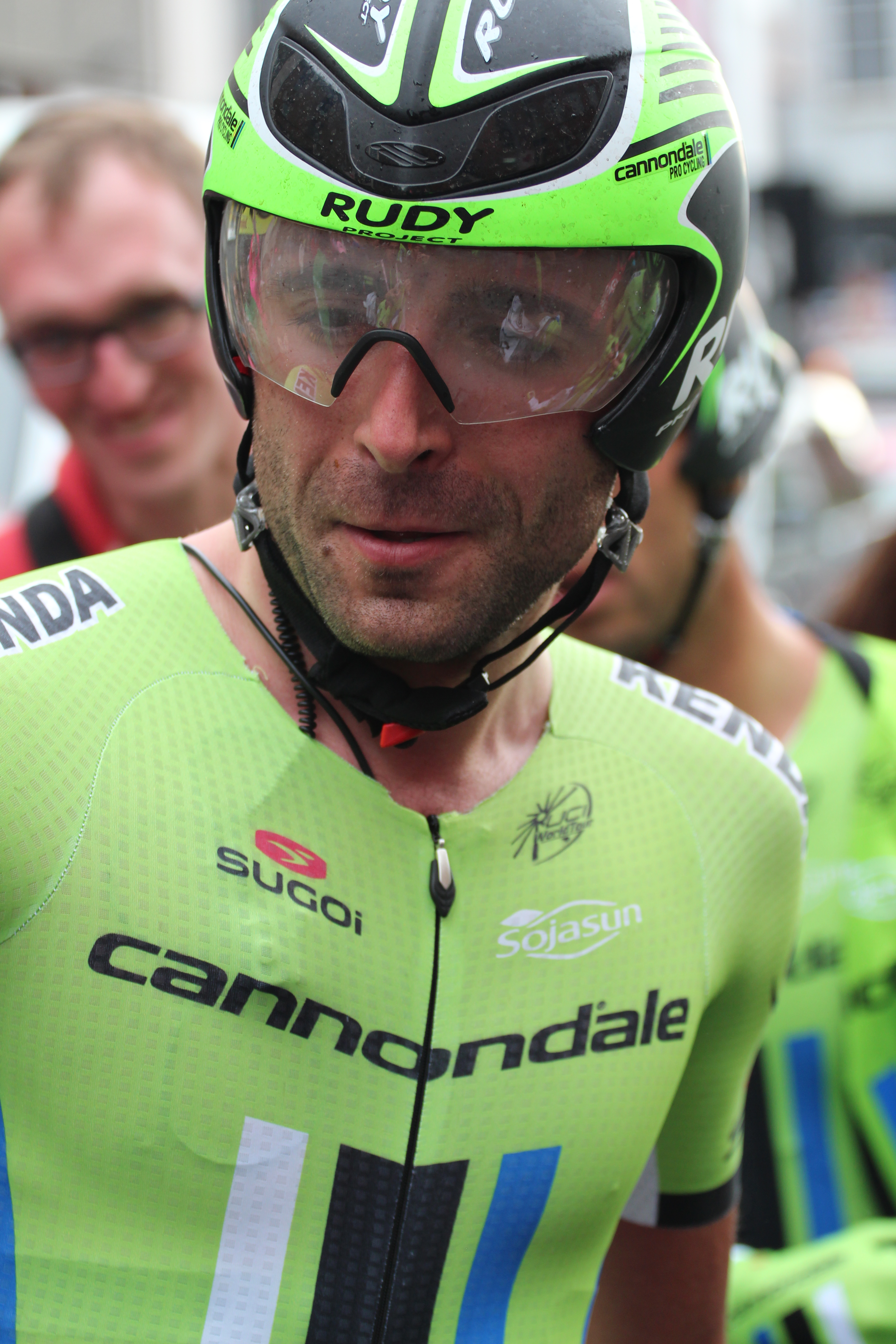
- Moser at the 2014 Giro d'Italia

Personal information
- Full name: Moreno Moser
- Born: 25 December 1990 (age 35) Trento, Italy
- Height: 1.77 m (5 ft 10 in)
- Weight: 64 kg (141 lb; 10.1 st)

Cycling career
- Sport: Cycling
- Discipline: Road
- Role: Rider
- Rider type: All-rounder

Amateur teams
- 2007–2008: U.S. Montecorona
- 2009–2011: Arvedi Lucchini Unidelta
- 2011: →Liquigas–Cannondale (stagiaire)

Professional teams
- 2012–2014: Liquigas–Cannondale
- 2015–2016: Cannondale–Garmin
- 2017–2018: Astana
- 2019: Nippo–Vini Fantini–Faizanè

Major wins
- Stage races Tour de Pologne (2012) One-day races and Classics Eschborn-Frankfurt City Loop (2012) Trofeo Laigueglia (2012, 2018) Strade Bianche (2013)

Moreno Moser (born 25 December 1990) is an Italian former professional road racing cyclist, who rode professionally between 2012 and 2019 for the Cannondale, Cannondale–Drapac, Astana and the Nippo–Vini Fantini–Faizanè teams.

Born in Trento, Moser comes from a family of professional cyclists; his uncles Francesco and Aldo both finished in the top five overall placings of Grand Tour events, with Francesco winning the Giro d'Italia in 1984, and another uncle, Enzo, also wore the leader's jersey in the Giro. His father Diego, brothers Leonardo and Matteo and cousin Ignazio also competed professionally. He was named in the start list for the 2015 Vuelta a España.

== Career ==
=== Early career ===
Having competed for U.S. Montecorona as a junior and Arvedi Lucchini Unidelta as an amateur, Moser joined professional team Liquigas–Cannondale in the second half of 2011 as a stagiaire. Moser remained with Liquigas–Cannondale after his stint as a stagiaire, having signed a two-year professional deal from 2012.

=== 2012 season ===
Moser achieved his first professional victory in February 2012, at the Trofeo Laigueglia, after making a solo bid for victory in the closing stages. He repeated that feat at May's Eschborn-Frankfurt City Loop, attacking out of a four-man lead group within the race's final kilometre.

Moser won his first UCI World Tour race at the Tour de Pologne in July. During the race's first stage, Moser launched a late attack in the closing kilometre, in Jelenia Góra; he managed to hold off the rest of the field for the stage win. He held the race lead until the fourth stage, when Omega Pharma–Quick-Step's Michał Kwiatkowski took the lead through bonus seconds gained at intermediate sprint points. On the penultimate stage, Moser took his second stage victory after passing Team Sky rider Sergio Henao in the closing metres, after he had gone off the front with an attack. Moser stayed out of trouble on the final stage, and won the race overall by five seconds, ahead of Kwiatkowski.

In the Grand Prix Cycliste de Montréal, Moser came close to victory as he was part of a group of four escapees that held a very small advantage over the lead group as they crossed the last kilometer mark. Team Katusha's Alexandr Kolobnev produced an acceleration, but was passed by Moser and Lars Petter Nordhaug (Team Sky), the latter grabbing the victory. Moser held on to second place, two seconds in arrears of the victor, while some members of the chasing group crossed the line only two seconds behind Moser.

=== 2013 season ===
In February, Moser helped his team-mate Peter Sagan win the Gran Premio Città di Camaiore by pulling the leading group and nullifying attacks such as one from their former team-mate Vincenzo Nibali, now riding for the Astana team. The following weekend, Moser then took victory at Strade Bianche in Siena, accelerating away from the peloton with around 17 km (11 mi) remaining in pursuit of a four-rider breakaway. He caught up to them and accelerated away from them on the final climb, a steep 16% gradient ramp inside the final kilometre; he led home a Cannondale one-two, as Sagan was able to finish in second place.

== Major results ==
2008
1st Stage 2 Giro della Lunigiana
2010
2nd Coppa Placci
2011
1st Giro del Medio Brenta
1st Trofeo Gianfranco Bianchin
2nd Trofeo Alcide Degasperi
3rd GP Capodarco
5th Overall Girobio

1st Stages 1 & 8

5th Gran Premio Palio del Recioto
2012
1st Overall Tour de Pologne

1st Stages 1 & 6

1st Trofeo Laigueglia
1st Eschborn-Frankfurt City Loop
2nd Grand Prix Cycliste de Montréal
2nd Trofeo Melinda
3rd Road race, National Road Championships
5th Giro di Toscana
7th Overall Settimana Internazionale di Coppi e Bartali
2013
1st Strade Bianche
2nd Eschborn-Frankfurt City Loop
7th Clásica de San Sebastián
2014
8th Japan Cup
2015
1st Stage 8 Tour of Austria
2nd Time trial, National Road Championships
7th Cadel Evans Great Ocean Road Race
10th Time trial, UCI Road World Championships
2016
3rd Time trial, UEC European Road Championships
3rd Time trial, National Road Championships
3rd GP Miguel Induráin
2018
1st Trofeo Laigueglia

=== Grand Tour general classification results timeline ===
Grand Tour	2013	2014	2015	2016
Giro d'Italia	—	120	—	41
Tour de France	94	—	—	—
Vuelta a España	—	—	72	72

Legend
—	Did not compete
DNF	Did not finish
