= Trofeo Laigueglia =

Italian one-day road cycling race

Race details
- Date: Mid-February
- Region: Liguria, Italy
- English name: Trophy of Laigueglia
- Local name: Trofeo Laigueglia (in Italian)
- Discipline: Road
- Competition: UCI ProSeries
- Type: Single-day
- Web site: www.trofeolaigueglia.it

History
- First edition: 1964
- Editions: 62 (as of 2025)
- First winner: Guido Neri (ITA)
- Most wins: Filippo Pozzato (ITA) (3 wins)
- Most recent: Santiago Buitrago (COL)

The Trofeo Laigueglia is an early season road bicycle race held annually in Liguria, Italy. It is held about ten days after the opening to the Italian season, the Gran Premio della Costa Etruschi. From 2005 to 2014, the race was organised as a 1.1 event on the UCI Europe Tour. In 2015, it was held as a 1.HC event. In 2020, the race joined the UCI ProSeries.

== Winners ==
Year	Country	Rider	Team
1964	Italy	Guido Neri	Molteni
1965	Italy	Marino Vigna	Ignis-Moschettieri Ignis
1966	Italy	Antonio Bailetti	Bianchi–Mobylette
1967	Italy	Franco Bitossi	Filotex
1968	Italy	Michele Dancelli	Pepsi–Cola
1969	Italy	Claudio Michelotto	Max Meyer
1970	Italy	Michele Dancelli	Molteni
1971	Italy	Italo Zilioli	Ferretti
1972	Italy	Wilmo Francioni	Ferretti
1973	Belgium	Eddy Merckx	Molteni
1974	Belgium	Eddy Merckx	Molteni
1975	Italy	Gianbattista Baronchelli	Scic
1976	Italy	Franco Bitossi	Zonca–Santini
1977	Belgium	Freddy Maertens	Flandria–Velda–Latina Assicurazioni
1978	Norway	Knut Knudsen	Bianchi-Faema
1979	Italy	Pierino Gavazzi	Zonca–Santini
1980	Belgium	Roger De Vlaeminck	Boule d'Or
1981	Italy	Giuseppe Saronni	Gis Gelati-Campagnolo
1982	Netherlands	Theo De Rooij	Capri Sonne
1983	Italy	Claudio Torelli	Sammontana
1984	Italy	Giuseppe Petito	Alfa Lum
1985	United States	Ron Kiefel	7 Eleven
1986	Italy	Mauro Longo	Malvor-Bottecchia
1987	Switzerland	Gilbert Glaus	Z-Peugeot
1988	Italy	Paolo Cimini	Fanini-Seven Up
1989	Italy	Pierino Gavazzi	Polli–Mobiexport
1990	Denmark	Rolf Sørensen	Ariostea
1991	Switzerland	Pascal Richard	Helvetia–La Suisse
1992	Belgium	Sammie Moreels	Lotto–Mavic–MBK
1993	United States	Lance Armstrong	Motorola
1994	Denmark	Rolf Sørensen	GB–MG Maglificio
1995	Belgium	Johan Museeuw	Mapei–GB–Latexco
1996	Belgium	Frank Vandenbroucke	Mapei–GB
1997	Italy	Michele Bartoli	MG Maglificio–Technogym
1998	France	Pascal Chanteur	Casino–Ag2r
1999	Italy	Paolo Savoldelli	Saeco–Cannondale
2000	Italy	Daniele Nardello	Mapei–Quick-Step
2001	Italy	Mirko Celestino	Saeco
2002	Italy	Danilo Di Luca	Saeco–Longoni Sport
2003	Italy	Filippo Pozzato	Fassa Bortolo
2004	Italy	Filippo Pozzato	Fassa Bortolo
2005	Luxembourg	Kim Kirchen	Fassa Bortolo
2006	Italy	Alessandro Ballan	Lampre–Fondital
2007	Russia	Mikhail Ignatiev	Tinkoff Credit Systems
2008	Italy	Luca Paolini	Acqua & Sapone–Caffè Mokambo
2009	Italy	Francesco Ginanni	Diquigiovanni–Androni
2010	Italy	Francesco Ginanni	Androni Giocattoli
2011	Italy	Daniele Pietropolli	Lampre–ISD
2012	Italy	Moreno Moser	Liquigas–Cannondale
2013	Italy	Filippo Pozzato	Lampre–Merida
2014	Colombia	José Serpa	Lampre–Merida
2015	Italy	Davide Cimolai	Lampre–Merida
2016	Italy	Andrea Fedi	Southeast–Venezuela
2017	Italy	Fabio Felline	Italy (national team)
2018	Italy	Moreno Moser	Italy (national team)
2019	Italy	Simone Velasco	Neri Sottoli–Selle Italia–KTM
2020	Italy	Giulio Ciccone	Italy (national team)
2021	Netherlands	Bauke Mollema	Trek–Segafredo
2022	Slovenia	Jan Polanc	UAE Team Emirates
2023	France	Nans Peters	AG2R Citroën Team
2024	France	Lenny Martinez	Groupama–FDJ
2025	Spain	Juan Ayuso	UAE Team Emirates XRG
2026	Colombia	Santiago Buitrago	Team Bahrain Victorious

=== Wins per country ===
Wins	Country
38	Italy
7	Belgium
3	France
2	Colombia; Denmark; Netherlands; Switzerland; United States
1	Luxembourg; Norway; Russia; Slovenia; Spain
