= Davide Cimolai =

Italian road racing cyclist

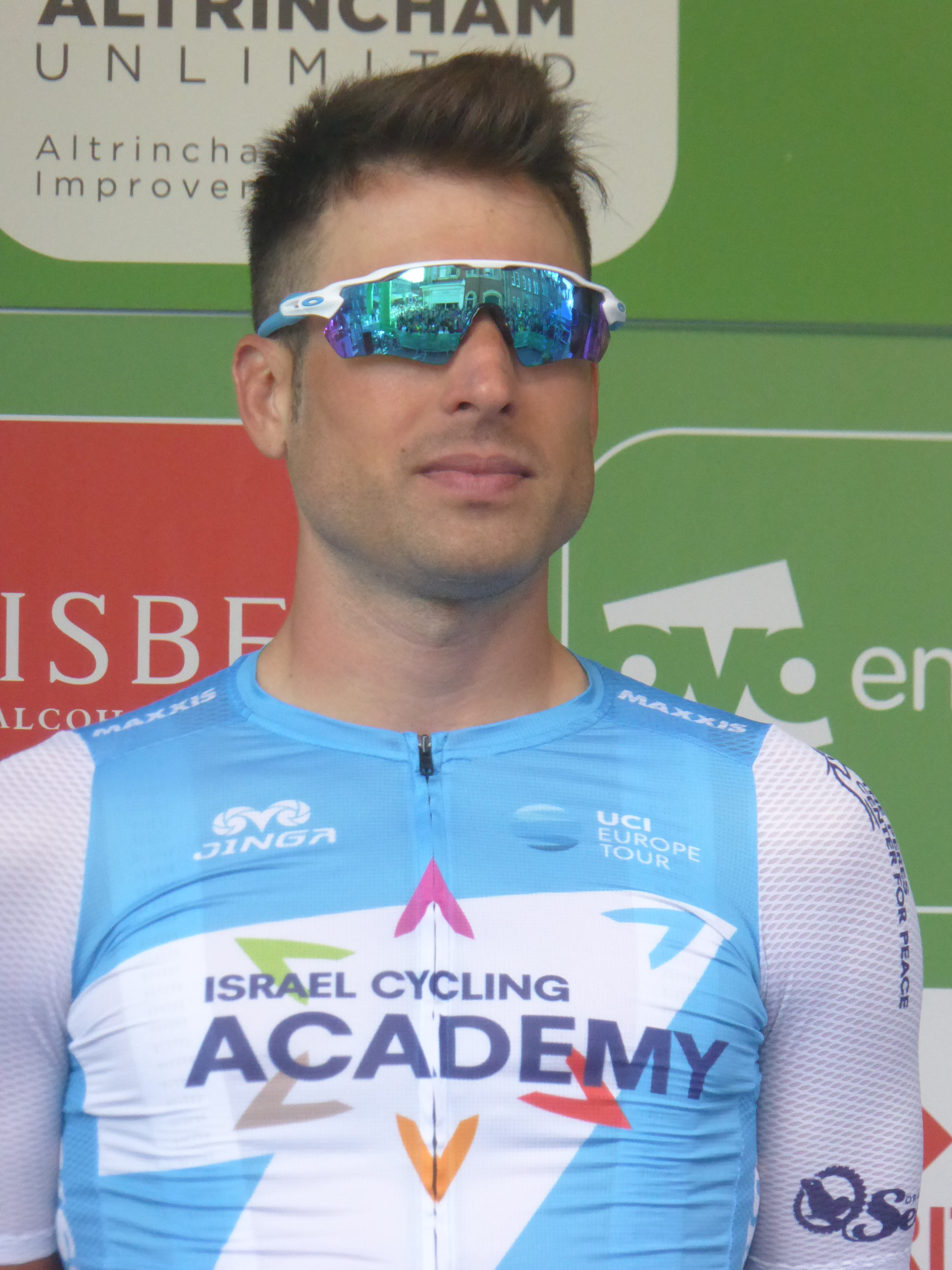
- Cimolai at the 2019 Tour of Britain

Personal information
- Full name: Davide Cimolai
- Nickname: Cimo
- Born: 13 August 1989 (age 37) Pordenone, Italy
- Height: 1.82 m (6 ft 0 in)
- Weight: 70 kg (150 lb)

Cycling career
- Sport: Cycling
- Disciplines: Road; Track
- Role: Rider
- Rider type: Sprinter; Lead-out man

Amateur team
- 2008–2009: Marchiol–Liquigas–Site

Professional teams
- 2010–2011: Liquigas–Doimo
- 2012–2016: Lampre–ISD
- 2017–2018: FDJ
- 2019–2021: Israel Cycling Academy
- 2022–2023: Cofidis
- 2024–2025: Movistar Team

Major wins
- One-day races and Classics Trofeo Laigueglia (2015)
Medal record
Representing Italy
Men's track cycling
UEC European Under-23 Championships
Gold medal – first place	2011 Anadia	Scratch
Silver medal – second place	2011 Anadia	Madison
Bronze medal – third place	2008 Pruszków	Team pursuit

Davide Cimolai (born 13 August 1989) is an Italian former professional road and track bicycle racer, who rode professionally between 2010 and 2025 for six different professional teams.

During his career, Cimolai took a total of nine victories, including the general classification and two stages at the 2019 Vuelta a Castilla y León, two stage victories at the Volta a Catalunya in 2016 and 2017, and a stage win at the 2015 Paris–Nice. He also operated as a lead-out rider for sprinters such as André Greipel, Bryan Coquard and Fernando Gaviria.

== Career ==
Born in Pordenone, Cimolai turned professional for the 2010 season, competing for the Liquigas–Doimo team until the end of 2011, recording a best individual finish of second place on a stage of the 2011 Tour of Turkey. During the 2011 season, Cimolai also won two medals at the UEC European Under-23 Track Championships: a gold medal in the scratch, and a silver medal in the madison with teammate Elia Viviani.

=== Lampre–ISD (2012–2016) ===
Cimolai joined the Lampre–ISD squad for the 2012 season. Cimolai made his Grand Tour début at that year's Vuelta a España, where he was the Lampre–ISD team's main sprinter in a climber-stacked squad; he finished inside the top ten of a stage for the first time, when he placed seventh on the second stage. He took his first podium finish with the team at the 2013 Trofeo Platja de Muro, held as part of the Vuelta a Mallorca one-day races, being outsprinted by Leigh Howard and Maarten Wynants. Towards the end of the season, Cimolai recorded top-five finishes at the Brussels Cycling Classic (fifth) and the Grand Prix de Fourmies (fourth). He recorded one top-ten finish in 2014, finishing seventh at the Vattenfall Cyclassics, but he was part of Sacha Modolo's sprint train, when Modolo won two stages at the Three Days of De Panne in the spring.

Cimolai's first two professional wins came in 2015. He won the Trofeo Laigueglia one-day race in February, winning a group sprint of some twenty-five riders in Laigueglia. A month later, Cimolai took his first victory at UCI World Tour level when he won the fifth stage of Paris–Nice, denying a late solo attack from Thomas De Gendt with a sprint win in Rasteau. He finished as part of the front group the following week at Milan–San Remo, in eighth place – recording his best finish at a cycling monument. Cimolai's first win of the 2016 season – and the first win for Lampre–Merida – came during the penultimate stage of March's Volta a Catalunya, winning a bunch sprint into Vilanova i la Geltrú. He later recorded a second victory, when he won the second stage of the Tour of Japan in Kyoto.

=== FDJ (2017–2018) ===
After five years with Lampre–Merida, Cimolai joined FDJ for the 2017 season to form part of the sprint train for the team's main sprinter, Arnaud Démare. Cimolai made his first start with the team at Étoile de Bessèges, where he helped Démare win two stages at the race. Cimolai's first win with the team came at the Volta a Catalunya, where he won the opening stage of the race in Calella, prevailing in the bunch sprint ahead of Nacer Bouhanni. He ceded the race lead after the following day's team time trial, as FDJ finished more than one-and-a-half minutes behind the Movistar Team. At the Tour de France, Cimolai was the final lead-out man for Démare in the sprint, as Démare won the fourth stage into Vittel. The following year, Cimolai's best result – fifth place – came in the road race of the UEC European Road Championships in Glasgow; he was one of two Italian riders that were part of a lead group that formed in the closing stages of the race, and he successfully led out Matteo Trentin in the final sprint for the gold medal.

=== Israel Cycling Academy (2019–2021) ===
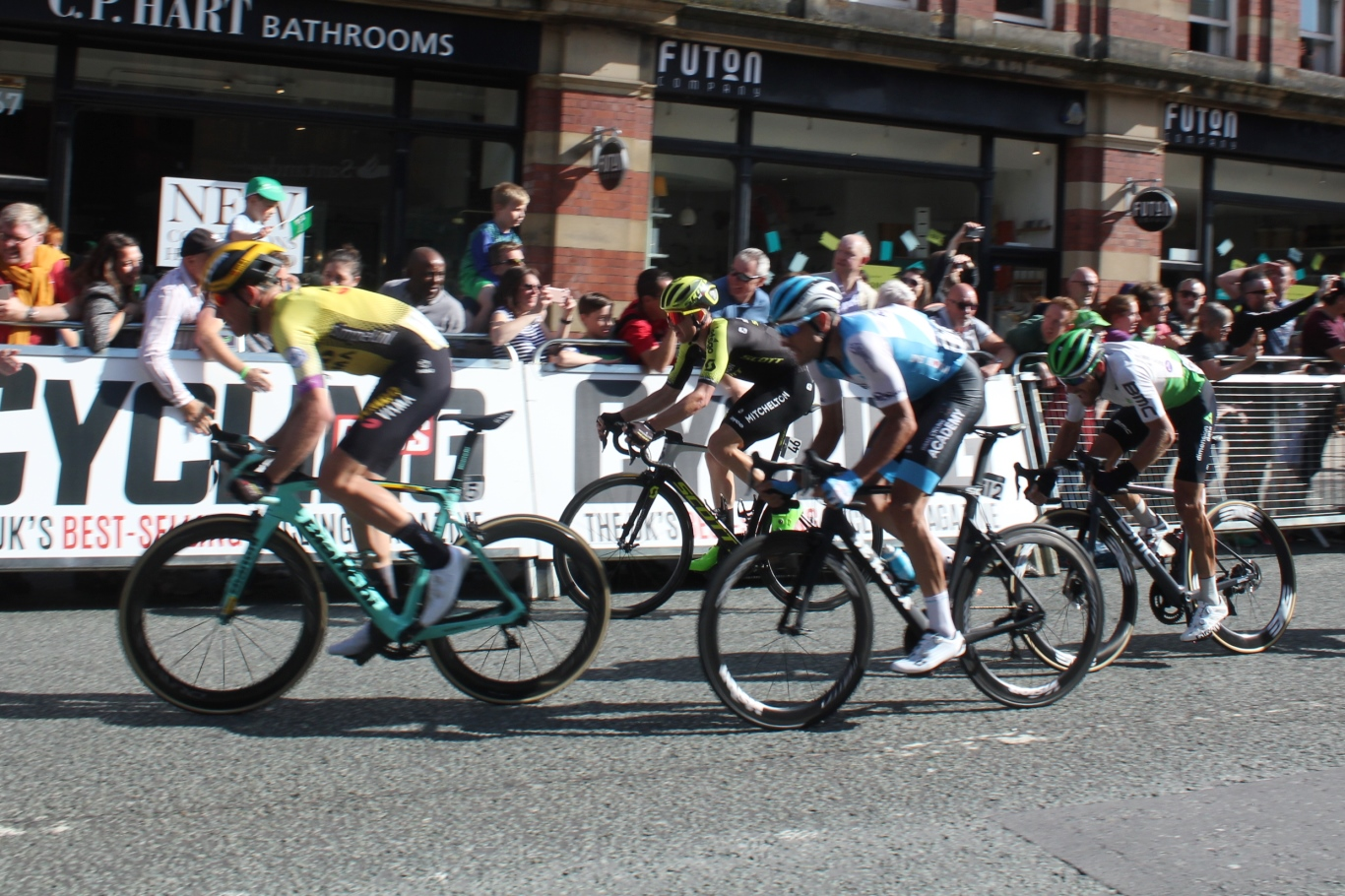
Cimolai (second from right) during the sprint on the final stage of the 2019 Tour of Britain in Manchester

Cimolai joined UCI Professional Continental team Israel Cycling Academy for the 2019 season, as part of their sprint setup. He came close to his first win with the team at March's Tirreno–Adriatico, when he finished second to Julian Alaphilippe on a slightly uphill finish in Jesi. The following month, Cimolai ultimately took his first wins with the team at the Vuelta a Castilla y León; he won each of the first two stages of the race – the first of which after Carlos Barbero was relegated – and finished eighth on the final stage, as he won the general classification ahead of teammate Guillaume Boivin. After a fourth-place finish at the Eschborn–Frankfurt one-day race, Cimolai made his début at the Giro d'Italia, but his best stage result was fifth place. He then won the fourth stage of the Tour de Wallonie into Verviers in July, before recording eight top-five sprint finish results across the Tour Poitou-Charentes en Nouvelle-Aquitaine (two) and the Tour of Britain (on six out of the eight stages). He formed part of the Italian team that contested the road race at the UCI Road World Championships in Yorkshire, but failed to finish.

Cimolai's 2020 season resulted in no top-three placings; he rode the Giro d'Italia for the second year in a row, finishing fifth on the sixth stage into Matera, while he formed part of the breakaway group on the penultimate stage. At the 2021 Giro d'Italia, Cimolai finished second to Peter Sagan in the points classification, but failed to win any stages – his best results were a pair of second places on stages three (behind Taco van der Hoorn) and seven (behind Caleb Ewan). He also rode the Vuelta a España, but abandoned the race during the eighth stage.

=== Cofidis and Movistar Team (2022–2025) ===
Cimolai joined Cofidis for the 2022 season, having signed a two-year contract with the team. Over those two seasons, he failed to record any top-three results – often being used as a lead-out rider for the team's main sprinter Bryan Coquard – and his highest one-day placing was a ninth-place finish at the 2023 Paris–Bourges, just behind Coquard. As a result, Cofidis elected not to renew his contract, and as a consequence, Cimolai was close to retiring from the sport.

He ultimately joined the Movistar Team for the 2024 season on an initial one-year contract, signing as a lead-out rider for Fernando Gaviria. Before linking up with Gaviria, Cimolai took two high placings in early-season Spanish races with fourth at the Clàssica Comunitat Valenciana 1969 and sixth at the Trofeo Ses Salines–Felanitx. He finished third on the final stage of Tirreno–Adriatico in March, before placing second to Caleb Ewan at July's Vuelta a Castilla y León. Cimolai remained with the team into 2025, as he signed a one-year contract extension in October 2024. Both Cimolai and Gaviria were winless in 2025, with Cimolai encountering health problems, resulting in hospitalisation and the near-amputation of his arm; he ultimately retired at the end of the season.

== Personal life ==
In 2018, Cimolai married his partner Greta Rover after five years together; however, the couple separated the following year. With partner Alessia, Cimolai is the father of two daughters. He operates a cycling coaching and bike fitting studio in Cordignano, which he set up following his retirement.

In 2021, Cimolai disclosed that he had an eating disorder during the early part of his professional career, and that he had "threw away two to three years of my career".

== Major results ==
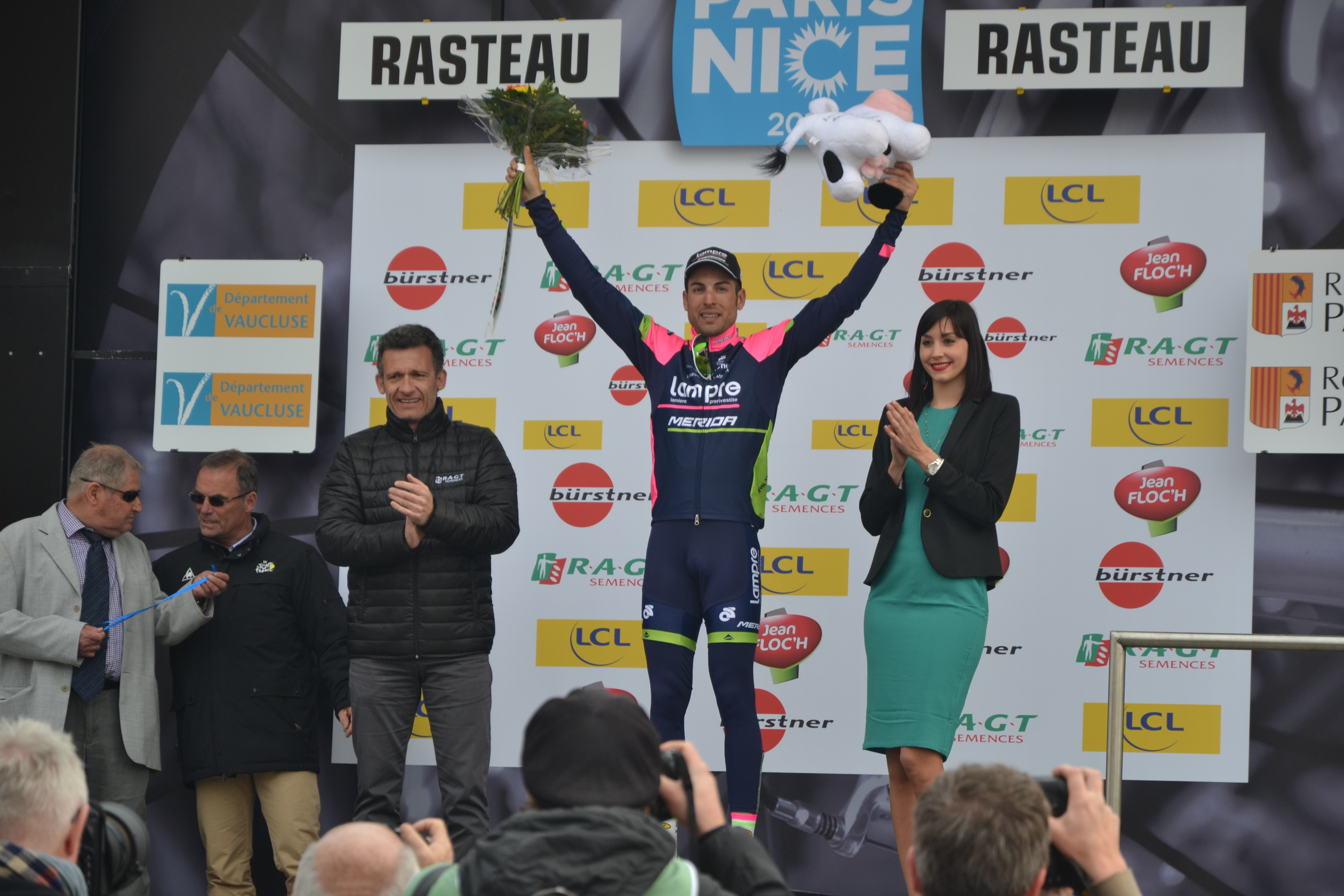
Cimolai took his first victory at UCI World Tour level, when he won the fifth stage of the 2015 Paris–Nice

2005
2nd Time trial, National Novice Road Championships
2006
National Junior Track Championships

2nd Madison (with Davide Calligaro)
3rd Individual pursuit
3rd Team pursuit

2007
1st Giro Ciclistico della Bassa Friulana
1st Gran Premio Ormesani
1st Medaglia d'oro Sportivi Castione
1st Giro della Romagna
1st GP R.E.M. Crema
1st Giro Delle Conche
1st Trofeo Orogildo
National Junior Track Championships

2nd Individual pursuit
2nd Points race
2nd Team sprint

2008
National Track Championships

1st Omnium
1st Team pursuit
3rd Individual pursuit

1st Piccolo Giro d'Emilia
1st Tre Giorni Citta di Pordenone
2nd UIV CUP Fiorenzuola
3rd Team pursuit, UEC European Under-23 Track Championships
2009
National Track Championships

1st Scratch
1st Team pursuit
2nd Points race
3rd Individual pursuit
3rd Omnium

1st Coppa San Geo
1st Trofeo Franco Balestra
1st Trofeo Banca Popolare di Vicenza
2nd Trofeo Marco Rusconi
2nd Medaglia d'Oro Fiera di Sommacampagna
3rd Medaglia d'Oro Frare De Nardi
3rd Memorial Danilo Furlan
3rd La Popolarissima
4th Giro Nazionale del Valdarno
5th Circuito Internazionale di Caneva
5th GP De Nardi
7th Trofeo Edil C
2010
National Track Championships

1st Points race
3rd Team pursuit

1st Stage 1b (TTT) Settimana Internazionale di Coppi e Bartali
4th Circuito de Getxo
9th GP Industria & Artigianato di Larciano
2011
UEC European Under-23 Track Championships

1st Scratch
2nd Madison (with Elia Viviani)

National Track Championships

1st Scratch
1st Madison (with Elia Viviani)
2nd Team pursuit

6th GP Kranj
2012
9th Overall Giro della Provincia di Reggio Calabria
2013
3rd Trofeo Platja de Muro
4th Grand Prix de Fourmies
5th Brussels Cycling Classic
2014
7th Vattenfall Cyclassics
2015
1st Trofeo Laigueglia
1st Stage 5 Paris–Nice
8th Milan–San Remo
2016
1st Stage 6 Volta a Catalunya
1st Stage 2 Tour of Japan
2017
1st Stage 1 Volta a Catalunya
5th La Roue Tourangelle
2018
5th Road race, UEC European Road Championships
6th Paris–Camembert
2019
1st Overall Vuelta a Castilla y León

1st Points classification
1st Stages 1 & 2

1st Stage 3 Tour de Wallonie
4th Eschborn–Frankfurt
6th Coppa Sabatini
10th Trofeo Laigueglia
2023
9th Paris–Bourges
2024
2nd Vuelta a Castilla y León
4th Clàssica Comunitat Valenciana 1969
6th Trofeo Ses Salines–Felanitx

=== Grand Tour general classification results timeline ===
Grand Tour	2012	2013	2014	2015	2016	2017	2018	2019	2020	2021	2022	2023	2024
Giro d'Italia	—	—	—	—	—	—	—	130	118	127	135	DNF	134
Tour de France	—	137	163	155	168	152	—	—	—	—	—	—	—
Vuelta a España	163	—	—	—	—	—	—	—	—	DNF	—	146	—

Legend
—	Did not compete
DNF	Did not finish
