= Orlinek (ski jumping hill) =

Coordinates: 50°46′05″N 15°44′35″E

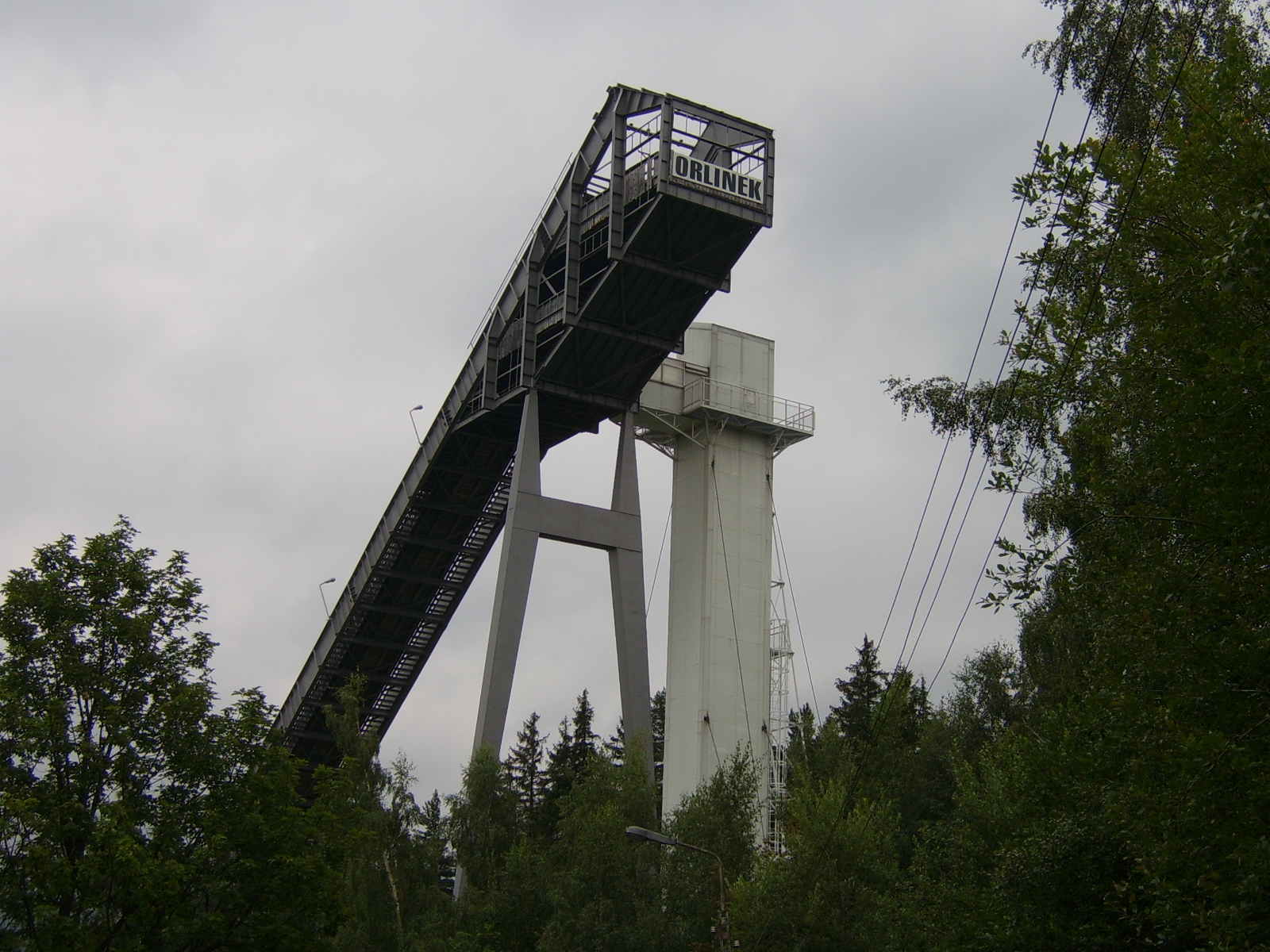
- Location: Karpacz; Poland
- Opened: 1978

Size
- K–point: K-85
- Hill size: HS 94
- Hill record: 94.5 m (310 ft) (Poland) Adam Małysz (29 January 2004)

Orlinek is a ski jumping hill in Karpacz, Poland.

== History ==
The first ski jumping hill in Karpacz, then known as Krummhübel, was opened in 1912 during the German Empire era. A record jump of 45.5 metres (149 ft) was set in 1938 by Karl-Heinz Breiter. During the World War II, the ski jump was abandoned and destroyed. After the war, Karpacz was placed under Polish administration, and a second ski jump was built under the leadership of Stanisław Marusarz. However, this ski jumping hill named Orlinek, collapsed during a storm in 1962. A replacement was built in 1978 and underwent modernization in 2000. The current record for the jump stands at 94.5 metres (310 ft), set by Adam Małysz.
