= Memorial Marco Pantani =

Italian one-day road cycling race

Race details
- Date: September
- Region: Emilia-Romagna, Italy
- Local name: Memorial Marco Pantani
- Discipline: Road
- Competition: UCI Europe Tour
- Type: Single-day
- Organiser: Gruppo Sportivo Emilia
- Web site: www.gsemilia.it

History
- First edition: 2004
- Editions: 22 (as of 2026)
- First winner: Damiano Cunego (ITA)
- Most wins: Fabio Felline (ITA); Sonny Colbrelli (ITA); Alexey Lutsenko (KAZ); (2 wins)
- Most recent: Ion Izagirre (ESP)

The Memorial Marco Pantani is a professional road bicycle race held annually in Emilia-Romagna, Italy.

== History ==
The race has been organized since 2004 and serves as a memory of Marco Pantani. The race starts in Cesenatico, Pantani's hometown, and follows a route towards his birthplace, Cesena. In 2007 the race was organised as a 1.1 event on the UCI Europe Tour. In 2013, the race was merged with the Giro della Romagna, a race in the same region.

After Gilberto Simoni won the 2005 edition of the race, he paid tribute to Pantani's memory by saying:

This race, paying our respects at the cemetery, the visit to Pantani's parents, have made me reflect a lot. Marco and I were never friends, we were rivals. 15 years ago we duelled as amateurs, and when we turned pro, he obtained important results and I did not. I can say that I was jealous and perhaps it was because of this that we never became friends. To be here and to win this race has a great importance for me. I want to remember Marco in a proper manner. Today, I won for him.

== Winners ==
Year	Country	Rider	Team
2004	Italy	Damiano Cunego	Saeco
2005	Italy	Gilberto Simoni	Lampre–Caffita
2006	Italy	Daniele Bennati	Lampre–Fondital
2007	Italy	Franco Pellizotti	Liquigas
2008	Italy	Enrico Rossi	NGC Medical-OTC Industria Porte
2009	Italy	Roberto Ferrari	LPR Brakes–Farnese Vini
2010	Italy	Elia Viviani	Liquigas–Doimo
2011	Italy	Fabio Taborre	Acqua & Sapone
2012	Italy	Fabio Felline	Androni Giocattoli–Venezuela
2013	Italy	Sacha Modolo	Bardiani Valvole–CSF Inox
2014	Italy	Sonny Colbrelli	Bardiani–CSF
2015	Italy	Diego Ulissi	Italian national team
2016	Italy	Francesco Gavazzi	Androni Giocattoli–Sidermec
2017	Italy	Marco Zamparella	Amore & Vita–Selle SMP
2018	Italy	Davide Ballerini	Androni Giocattoli–Sidermec
2019	Kazakhstan	Alexey Lutsenko	Astana
2020	Italy	Fabio Felline	Astana
2021	Italy	Sonny Colbrelli	Team Bahrain Victorious
2022	No race		
2023	Kazakhstan	Alexey Lutsenko	Astana Qazaqstan Team
2024	Switzerland	Marc Hirschi	UAE Team Emirates
2025	Australia	Michael Storer	Tudor Pro Cycling Team
2026	Spain	Ion Izagirre	Cofidis
