= 2013 Cannondale season =

2013 Cannondale season
Manager	Roberto Amadio
One-day victories	6
Stage race overall victories	1
Stage race stage victories	24
Previous season • Next season

The 2013 season for Cannondale began in January with the Tour Down Under. As a UCI ProTeam, they were automatically invited and obligated to send a squad to every event in the UCI World Tour.

== Team roster ==
As of 3 November 2013.

Rider	Date of birth
Stefano Agostini (Note: Agostini was sacked by the team in August 2013, after recording an adverse analytical finding for clostebol in an out-of-competition test.) (ITA)	3 January 1989 (aged 23)
Ivan Basso (ITA)	26 November 1977 (aged 35)
Maciej Bodnar (POL)	7 March 1985 (aged 27)
Guillaume Boivin (CAN)	25 September 1989 (aged 23)
Federico Canuti (ITA)	30 August 1985 (aged 27)
Damiano Caruso (ITA)	12 October 1987 (aged 25)
Mauro Da Dalto (ITA)	8 April 1981 (aged 31)
Tiziano Dall'Antonia (ITA)	26 July 1983 (aged 29)
Alessandro De Marchi (ITA)	19 May 1986 (aged 26)
Lucas Sebastián Haedo (ARG)	18 April 1983 (aged 29)
Ted King (USA)	31 January 1983 (aged 29)
Michel Koch (GER)	15 October 1991 (aged 21)
Kristijan Koren (SLO)	25 November 1986 (aged 26)
Matthias Krizek (AUT)	29 September 1988 (aged 24)
Paolo Longo Borghini (ITA)	10 December 1980 (aged 32)

Rider	Date of birth
Alan Marangoni (ITA)	16 July 1984 (aged 28)
Nicolò Martinello (Note: Martinello joined the team on 1 August as a stagiaire, from Union Raiffeisen Radteam Tirol.) (ITA)	1 November 1989 (aged 23)
Nariyuki Masuda (JPN)	23 October 1983 (aged 29)
Moreno Moser (ITA)	25 December 1990 (aged 22)
Maciej Paterski (POL)	12 September 1986 (aged 26)
Daniele Ratto (ITA)	5 October 1989 (aged 23)
Fabio Sabatini (ITA)	18 February 1985 (aged 27)
Juraj Sagan (SVK)	23 December 1988 (aged 24)
Peter Sagan (SVK)	26 January 1990 (aged 22)
Cristiano Salerno (ITA)	18 February 1985 (aged 27)
Cayetano Sarmiento (COL)	28 March 1987 (aged 25)
Brian Vandborg (DEN)	4 December 1981 (aged 31)
Davide Villella (Note: Villella joined the team on 1 August as a stagiaire, from Team Colpack.) (ITA)	27 June 1991 (aged 21)
Elia Viviani (ITA)	7 February 1989 (aged 23)
Cameron Wurf (AUS)	3 August 1983 (aged 29)

Riders who joined the team for the 2013 season

Rider	2012 team
Guillaume Boivin	SpiderTech–C10
Alessandro De Marchi	Androni Giocattoli–Venezuela
Lucas Sebastián Haedo	Saxo Bank–Tinkoff Bank
Michel Koch	LKT Team Brandenburg
Matthias Krizek	neo-pro (stagiaire, Liquigas–Cannondale)
Nariyuki Masuda	Utsunomiya Blitzen
Brian Vandborg	SpiderTech–C10
Cameron Wurf	Champion System

Riders who left the team during or after the 2012 season

Rider	2013 team
Valerio Agnoli	Astana
Eros Capecchi	Movistar Team
Timmy Duggan	Saxo–Tinkoff
Dominik Nerz	BMC Racing Team
Vincenzo Nibali	Astana
Daniel Oss	BMC Racing Team
Sylwester Szmyd	Movistar Team
Alessandro Vanotti	Astana

== Season victories ==
Date	Race	Competition	Rider	Country	Location
12 February	Tour of Oman, Stage 2	UCI Asia Tour	Peter Sagan (SVK)	Oman	Al Bustan
13 February	Tour of Oman, Stage 3	UCI Asia Tour	Peter Sagan (SVK)	Oman	Wadi Dayqah Dam
28 February	Gran Premio Città di Camaiore	UCI Europe Tour	Peter Sagan (SVK)	Italy	Camaiore
2 March	Strade Bianche	UCI Europe Tour	Moreno Moser (ITA)	Italy	Siena
8 March	Tirreno–Adriatico, Stage 3	UCI World Tour	Peter Sagan (SVK)	Italy	Narni Scalo
11 March	Tirreno–Adriatico, Stage 6	UCI World Tour	Peter Sagan (SVK)	Italy	Porto Sant'Elpidio
24 March	Volta a Catalunya, Mountains classification	UCI World Tour	Cristiano Salerno (ITA)	Spain	
24 March	Gent–Wevelgem	UCI World Tour	Peter Sagan (SVK)	Belgium	Wevelgem
24 March	Settimana Internazionale di Coppi e Bartali, Stage 5	UCI Europe Tour	Damiano Caruso (ITA)	Italy	Fiorano Modenese
26 March	Three Days of De Panne, Stage 1	UCI Europe Tour	Peter Sagan (SVK)	Belgium	Zottegem
10 April	Brabantse Pijl	UCI Europe Tour	Peter Sagan (SVK)	Belgium	Overijse
14 May	Tour of California, Stage 3	UCI America Tour	Peter Sagan (SVK)	United States	Santa Clarita
19 May	Tour of California, Stage 8	UCI America Tour	Peter Sagan (SVK)	United States	Santa Rosa
19 May	Tour of California, Sprints classification	UCI America Tour	Peter Sagan (SVK)	United States	
26 May	Giro d'Italia, Fair Play classification	UCI World Tour	(Note: The riders on the squad were Damiano Caruso, Tiziano Dall'Antonia, Paolo Longo Borghini, Alan Marangoni, Fabio Sabatini, Cristiano Salerno, Cayetano Sarmiento, Elia Viviani and Cameron Wurf)	Italy	
3 June	Critérium du Dauphiné, Stage 2	UCI World Tour	Elia Viviani (ITA)	France	Oyonnax
9 June	Critérium du Dauphiné, Stage 8	UCI World Tour	Alessandro De Marchi (ITA)	France	Risoul
10 June	Tour de Suisse, Stage 3	UCI World Tour	Peter Sagan (SVK)	Switzerland	Meiringen
15 June	Tour de Suisse, Stage 8	UCI World Tour	Peter Sagan (SVK)	Switzerland	Bad Ragaz
16 June	Tour de Suisse, Points classification	UCI World Tour	Peter Sagan (SVK)	Switzerland	
5 July	Tour de France, Stage 7	UCI World Tour	Peter Sagan (SVK)	France	Albi
21 July	Tour de France, Points classification	UCI World Tour	Peter Sagan (SVK)	France	
3 August	Tour of Elk Grove, Stage 2	UCI America Tour	Elia Viviani (ITA)	United States	Elk Grove
4 August	Tour of Elk Grove, Stage 3	UCI America Tour	Elia Viviani (ITA)	United States	Elk Grove
4 August	Tour of Elk Grove, Overall	UCI America Tour	Elia Viviani (ITA)	United States	
19 August	USA Pro Cycling Challenge, Stage 1	UCI America Tour	Peter Sagan (SVK)	United States	Aspen
21 August	USA Pro Cycling Challenge, Stage 3	UCI America Tour	Peter Sagan (SVK)	United States	Steamboat Springs
23 August	Dutch Food Valley Classic	UCI Europe Tour	Elia Viviani (ITA)	Netherlands	Veenendaal
24 August	USA Pro Cycling Challenge, Stage 6	UCI America Tour	Peter Sagan (SVK)	United States	Fort Collins
25 August	USA Pro Cycling Challenge, Stage 7	UCI America Tour	Peter Sagan (SVK)	United States	Denver
25 August	USA Pro Cycling Challenge, Sprints classification	UCI America Tour	Peter Sagan (SVK)	United States	
3 September	Tour of Alberta, Prologue	UCI America Tour	Peter Sagan (SVK)	Canada	Edmonton
4 September	Tour of Alberta, Stage 1	UCI America Tour	Peter Sagan (SVK)	Canada	Camrose
7 September	Vuelta a España, Stage 14	UCI World Tour	Daniele Ratto (ITA)	Andorra	Andorra–Collada de la Gallina
8 September	Tour of Alberta, Stage 5	UCI America Tour	Peter Sagan (SVK)	Canada	Calgary
8 September	Tour of Alberta, Sprints classification	UCI America Tour	Peter Sagan (SVK)	Canada	
15 September	Tour of Britain, Stage 1	UCI Europe Tour	Elia Viviani (ITA)	Great Britain	Drumlanrig Castle
15 September	Grand Prix Cycliste de Montréal	UCI World Tour	Peter Sagan (SVK)	Canada	Montreal
15 October	Tour of Beijing, Mountains classification	UCI World Tour	Damiano Caruso (ITA)	China	
