= 2012 Liquigas–Cannondale season =

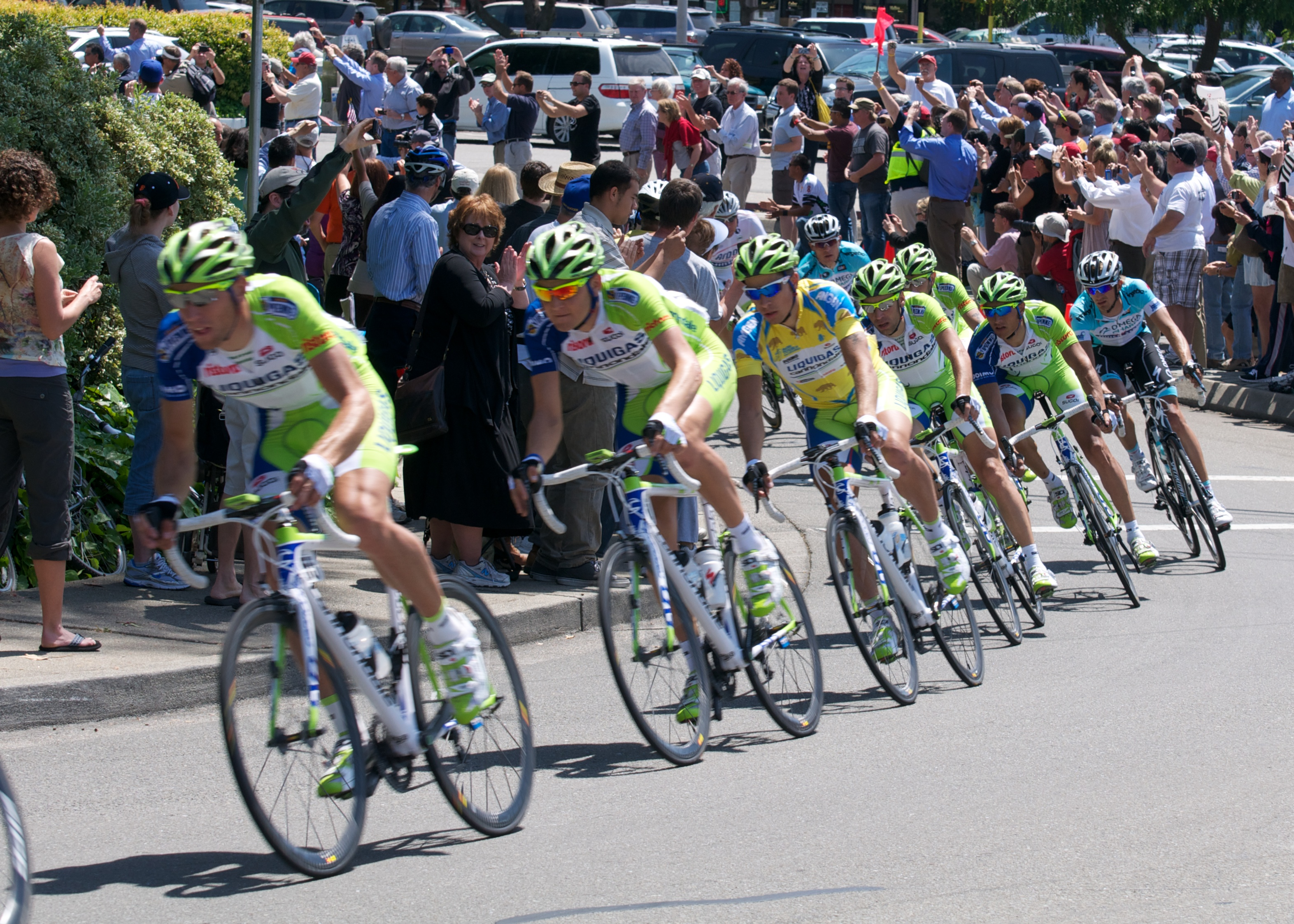
2012 Liquigas–Cannondale season

2012 Liquigas–Cannondale season
Manager	Roberto Amadio
One-day victories	5
Stage race overall victories	4
Stage race stage victories	26
Previous season • Next season

The 2012 season for Liquigas–Cannondale began in January with the Tour Down Under. As a UCI ProTeam, they were automatically invited and obligated to send a squad to every event in the UCI World Tour.

== Team roster ==
Ages as of 1 January 2012.

Rider	Date of birth
Valerio Agnoli (ITA)	6 January 1985 (aged 26)
Stefano Agostini (ITA)	3 January 1989 (aged 22)
Daniele Aldegheri (Note: Aldegheri joined the team on 1 August, as a stagiaire, from U.C. Trevigiani–Dynamon–Bottoli.) (ITA)	5 February 1990 (aged 21)
Ivan Basso (ITA)	26 November 1977 (aged 34)
Marco Benfatto (Note: Benfatto joined the team on 1 August, as a stagiaire, from Team Idea.) (ITA)	6 January 1988 (aged 23)
Maciej Bodnar (POL)	7 March 1985 (aged 26)
Federico Canuti (ITA)	30 August 1985 (aged 26)
Eros Capecchi (ITA)	13 June 1986 (aged 25)
Damiano Caruso (ITA)	12 October 1987 (aged 24)
Mauro Da Dalto (ITA)	8 April 1981 (aged 30)
Tiziano Dall'Antonia (ITA)	26 July 1983 (aged 28)
Timothy Duggan (USA)	14 November 1982 (aged 29)
Ted King (USA)	31 January 1983 (aged 28)
Kristjan Koren (SLO)	25 November 1986 (aged 25)
Matthias Krizek (Note: Krizek joined the team on 1 August, as a stagiaire, from Team Marchiol-Emisfero-Site.) (AUT)	29 September 1988 (aged 23)

Rider	Date of birth
Paolo Longo Borghini (ITA)	10 December 1980 (aged 31)
Alan Marangoni (ITA)	16 July 1984 (aged 27)
Moreno Moser (ITA)	25 December 1990 (aged 21)
Dominik Nerz (GER)	25 August 1989 (aged 22)
Vincenzo Nibali (ITA)	14 November 1984 (aged 27)
Daniel Oss (ITA)	13 January 1987 (aged 24)
Maciej Paterski (POL)	12 September 1986 (aged 25)
Daniele Ratto (ITA)	5 October 1989 (aged 22)
Fabio Sabatini (ITA)	18 February 1985 (aged 26)
Juraj Sagan (SVK)	23 December 1988 (aged 23)
Peter Sagan (SVK)	26 January 1990 (aged 21)
Cristiano Salerno (ITA)	18 February 1985 (aged 26)
Cayetano Sarmiento (COL)	28 March 1987 (aged 24)
Sylwester Szmyd (POL)	2 March 1978 (aged 33)
Alessandro Vanotti (ITA)	16 September 1980 (aged 31)
Elia Viviani (ITA)	7 February 1989 (aged 22)

Riders who joined the team for the 2012 season

Rider	2011 team
Stefano Agostini	stagiaire (Liquigas–Cannondale)
Federico Canuti	Colnago–CSF Inox
Moreno Moser	stagiaire (Liquigas–Cannondale)
Daniele Ratto	Geox–TMC
Cayetano Sarmiento	Acqua & Sapone

Riders who left the team during or after the 2011 season

Rider	2012 team
Jacopo Guarnieri	Astana
Francesco Bellotti	None
Davide Cimolai	Lampre–ISD
Mauro Finetto	None
Simone Ponzi	Astana
Cameron Wurf	Champion System

== Season victories ==
Date	Race	Competition	Rider	Country	Location
28 January	Tour de San Luis, Stage 6	UCI America Tour	Elia Viviani (ITA)	Argentina	Quines
4 February	Gran Premio della Costa Etruschi	UCI Europe Tour	Elia Viviani (ITA)	Italy	Donoratico
11 February	Giro della Provincia di Reggio Calabria, Stage 1	UCI Europe Tour	Elia Viviani (ITA)	Italy	Chiaravalle Centrale
12 February	Giro della Provincia di Reggio Calabria, Stage 2	UCI Europe Tour	Elia Viviani (ITA)	Italy	Reggio Calabria
12 February	Giro della Provincia di Reggio Calabria, Overall	UCI Europe Tour	Elia Viviani (ITA)	Italy	
12 February	Giro della Provincia di Reggio Calabria, Young rider classification	UCI Europe Tour	Elia Viviani (ITA)	Italy	
15 February	Tour of Oman, Stage 2	UCI Asia Tour	Peter Sagan (SVK)	Oman	Wadi Dhaiqah
18 February	Tour of Oman, Stage 5	UCI Asia Tour	Vincenzo Nibali (ITA)	Oman	Jabal al Akhdar
18 February	Trofeo Laigueglia	UCI Europe Tour	Moreno Moser (ITA)	Italy	Laigueglia
19 February	Tour of Oman, Points classification	UCI Asia Tour	Peter Sagan (SVK)	Oman	
26 February	Gran Premio di Lugano	UCI Europe Tour	Eros Capecchi (ITA)	Switzerland	Lugano
10 March	Tirreno–Adriatico, Stage 4	UCI World Tour	Peter Sagan (SVK)	Italy	Chieti
11 March	Tirreno–Adriatico, Stage 5	UCI World Tour	Vincenzo Nibali (ITA)	Italy	Prati di Tivo
13 March	Tirreno–Adriatico, Overall	UCI World Tour	Vincenzo Nibali (ITA)	Italy	
13 March	Tirreno–Adriatico, Points classification	UCI World Tour	Vincenzo Nibali (ITA)	Italy	
21 March	Settimana internazionale di Coppi e Bartali, Stage 2a	UCI Europe Tour	Elia Viviani (ITA)	Italy	Gatteo
27 March	Three Days of De Panne, Stage 1	UCI Europe Tour	Peter Sagan (SVK)	Belgium	Oudenaarde
1 May	Eschborn-Frankfurt City Loop	UCI Europe Tour	Moreno Moser (ITA)	Germany	Frankfurt
13 May	Tour of California, Stage 1	UCI America Tour	Peter Sagan (SVK)	United States	Santa Rosa
14 May	Tour of California, Stage 2	UCI America Tour	Peter Sagan (SVK)	United States	Santa Cruz County
15 May	Tour of California, Stage 3	UCI America Tour	Peter Sagan (SVK)	United States	Livermore
16 May	Tour of California, Stage 4	UCI America Tour	Peter Sagan (SVK)	United States	Clovis
20 May	Tour of California, Stage 8	UCI America Tour	Peter Sagan (SVK)	United States	Los Angeles
20 May	Tour of California, Sprints classification	UCI America Tour	Peter Sagan (SVK)	United States	
9 June	Tour de Suisse, Stage 1	UCI World Tour	Peter Sagan (SVK)	Switzerland	Lugano
10 June	Critérium du Dauphiné, Mountains classification	UCI World Tour	Cayetano Sarmiento (COL)	France	
11 June	Tour de Suisse, Stage 3	UCI World Tour	Peter Sagan (SVK)	Switzerland	Aarberg
12 June	Tour de Suisse, Stage 4	UCI World Tour	Peter Sagan (SVK)	Switzerland	Trimbach-Olten
14 June	Tour de Suisse, Stage 6	UCI World Tour	Peter Sagan (SVK)	Switzerland	Bischofszell
17 June	Tour de Suisse, Points classification	UCI World Tour	Peter Sagan (SVK)	Switzerland	
17 June	Tour of Slovenia, Stage 4	UCI Europe Tour	Kristijan Koren (SLO)	Slovenia	Ljubljana
17 June	Tour of Slovenia, Points classification	UCI Europe Tour	Kristijan Koren (SLO)	Slovenia	
17 June	Tour of Slovenia, Teams classification	UCI Europe Tour	(Note: The riders on the squad were Valerio Agnoli, Maciej Bodnar, Damiano Caruso, Kristijan Koren, Alan Marangoni, Dominik Nerz, Daniele Ratto and Juraj Sagan)	Slovenia	
1 July	Tour de France, Stage 1	UCI World Tour	Peter Sagan (SVK)	Belgium	Seraing
3 July	Tour de France, Stage 3	UCI World Tour	Peter Sagan (SVK)	France	Boulogne-sur-Mer
6 July	Tour de France, Stage 6	UCI World Tour	Peter Sagan (SVK)	France	Metz
10 July	Tour de Pologne, Stage 1	UCI World Tour	Moreno Moser (ITA)	Poland	Jelenia Góra
15 July	Tour de Pologne, Stage 6	UCI World Tour	Moreno Moser (ITA)	Poland	Bukowina Tatrzańska
16 July	Tour de Pologne, Overall	UCI World Tour	Moreno Moser (ITA)	Poland	
22 July	Tour de France, Points classification	UCI World Tour	Peter Sagan (SVK)	France	
6 September	Giro di Padania, Stage 4	UCI Europe Tour	Vincenzo Nibali (ITA)	Italy	Passo della Bocchetta
7 September	Giro di Padania, Overall	UCI Europe Tour	Vincenzo Nibali (ITA)	Italy	
7 September	Giro di Padania, Points classification	UCI Europe Tour	Vincenzo Nibali (ITA)	Italy	
7 September	Giro di Padania, Mountains classification	UCI Europe Tour	Vincenzo Nibali (ITA)	Italy	
9 October	Tour of Beijing, Stage 1	UCI World Tour	Elia Viviani (ITA)	China	Bird's Nest
13 October	Tour of Beijing, Teams classification	UCI World Tour	(Note: The riders on the squad were Moreno Moser, Eros Capecchi, Mauro Da Dalto, Tiziano Dall'Antonia, Maciej Paterski, Daniele Ratto, Cristiano Salerno and Elia Viviani)	China	
21 October	Japan Cup	UCI Asia Tour	Ivan Basso (ITA)	Japan	Utsunomiya
