= 2011 Liquigas–Cannondale season =

2011 Liquigas–Cannondale season
| Manager | Roberto Amadio |
| One-day victories | 7 |
| Stage race overall victories | 3 |
| Stage race stage victories | 21 |
Previous season • Next season

The 2011 season for Liquigas–Cannondale began in January with the Tour de San Luis and ended in October at the Japan Cup. As a UCI ProTeam, they were automatically invited and obligated to send a squad to every event in the UCI World Tour.

The team had 30 victories in 2011, second-most among top teams behind only HTC–Highroad. The team's most prolific winners were Peter Sagan and Elia Viviani, who accounted for 22 of them. The team failed to relive their great successes of 2010 in the Grand Tours – Ivan Basso, though the reigning Giro d'Italia champion, declined to defend that crown and focused instead on the Tour de France. Vincenzo Nibali was instead the leader for the Giro, and again for the Vuelta a España, where he did return to defend his championship. The team took two stage wins each in the Giro and Vuelta, but did not mount a serious threat for the overall crown in any of the three. Elsewhere, the team's principal successes were in single-day races, especially those in their home country Italy, winning seven such races.

== Team roster ==
Ages as of January 1, 2011.

| Rider | Date of birth |
|---|---|
| Valerio Agnoli (ITA) | January 6, 1985 (aged 25) |
| Stefano Agostini (Note: Rider joined the team on August 1 as a stagiaire.) (ITA) | January 3, 1989 (aged 21) |
| Ivan Basso (ITA) | November 26, 1977 (aged 33) |
| Francesco Bellotti (ITA) | August 6, 1979 (aged 31) |
| Maciej Bodnar (POL) | March 7, 1985 (aged 25) |
| Eros Capecchi (ITA) | June 13, 1986 (aged 24) |
| Damiano Caruso (ITA) | October 12, 1987 (aged 23) |
| Davide Cimolai (ITA) | August 13, 1989 (aged 21) |
| Mauro Da Dalto (ITA) | April 8, 1981 (aged 29) |
| Tiziano Dall'Antonia (ITA) | July 26, 1983 (aged 27) |
| Timothy Duggan (USA) | November 14, 1982 (aged 28) |
| Mauro Finetto (ITA) | June 16, 1979 (aged 31) |
| Jacopo Guarnieri (ITA) | August 14, 1987 (aged 23) |
| Ted King (USA) | January 31, 1983 (aged 27) |
| Kristjan Koren (SLO) | November 25, 1986 (aged 24) |
| Paolo Longo Borghini (ITA) | December 10, 1980 (aged 30) |

| Rider | Date of birth |
|---|---|
| Alan Marangoni (ITA) | July 16, 1984 (aged 26) |
| Moreno Moser (ITA) | December 25, 1990 (aged 20) |
| Dominik Nerz (GER) | August 25, 1989 (aged 21) |
| Vincenzo Nibali (ITA) | November 14, 1984 (aged 26) |
| Daniel Oss (ITA) | January 13, 1987 (aged 23) |
| Maciej Paterski (POL) | September 12, 1986 (aged 24) |
| Simone Ponzi (ITA) | January 17, 1987 (aged 23) |
| Fabio Sabatini (ITA) | February 18, 1985 (aged 25) |
| Juraj Sagan (SVK) | December 23, 1988 (aged 22) |
| Peter Sagan (SVK) | January 26, 1990 (aged 20) |
| Cristiano Salerno (ITA) | February 18, 1985 (aged 25) |
| Sylwester Szmyd (POL) | March 2, 1978 (aged 32) |
| Alessandro Vanotti (ITA) | September 16, 1980 (aged 30) |
| Elia Viviani (ITA) | February 7, 1989 (aged 21) |
| Cameron Wurf (AUS) | August 3, 1983 (aged 27) |

Riders who joined the team for the 2011 season

| Rider | 2010 team |
|---|---|
| Eros Capecchi | Footon–Servetto–Fuji |
| Paolo Longo Borghini | ISD–NERI |
| Damiano Caruso | De Rosa–Stac Plastic |
| Mauro Da Dalto | Lampre–Farnese |
| Timothy Duggan | Garmin–Transitions |
| Ted King | Cervélo TestTeam |
| Alan Marangoni | Colnago–CSF Inox |
| Dominik Nerz | Team Milram |
| Simone Ponzi | Lampre–Farnese |
| Cristiano Salerno | De Rosa–Stac Plastic |
| Cameron Wurf | Androni Giocattoli |

Riders who left the team during or after the 2010 season

| Rider | 2011 team |
|---|---|
| Daniele Bennati | Leopard Trek |
| Francesco Chicchi | Quick-Step |
| Robert Kišerlovski | Astana |
| Roman Kreuziger | Astana |
| Aleksandr Kuschynski | Team Katusha |
| Franco Pellizotti | Suspended |
| Manuel Quinziato | BMC Racing Team |
| Ivan Santaromita | BMC Racing Team |
| Brian Vandborg | Saxo Bank–SunGard |
| Frederik Willems | Omega Pharma–Lotto |
| Oliver Zaugg | Leopard Trek |

== One-day races ==
Before the spring season and the races known as classics, Viviani won the first single-day race of the season held in Italy, the Gran Premio della Costa Etruschi. The finish was a field sprint, and Viviani came in first after a leadout from Peter Sagan, who held on for fourth. The race was noteworthy as well for the absence of six-time reigning champion Alessandro Petacchi from the team's Italian rivals Lampre–ISD. Viviani also won the first Tour de Mumbai race, and nearly won the second, finishing just centimeters behind Team RadioShack's Robert Hunter.

=== Spring classics ===
Basso won the Gran Premio di Lugano in late February. After Caruso launched an attack that effectively softened the field, Basso's winning move came as his teammate was caught. He drew Geox–TMC's Fabio Duarte with him, and defeated him in the sprint 16 seconds ahead of the front of the remaining field. The team came to the first monument race of the season, Milan–San Remo, without a real field sprinter, despite that race's tendency to end in a sprint. When a crash occurred on the Le Manie climb 90 km (56 mi) from the finish line, effectively splitting the race into two groups, Nibali and BMC Racing Team captain Alessandro Ballan struck a deal wherein both squads would send men to the front of the leading group. This was both to keep the group out ahead of the second so that sprinters left behind like Óscar Freire, Mark Cavendish, and Tyler Farrar would not be able to contest the win, but also to potentially get rid of the few sprinters that had made the split, namely Tom Boonen, Alessandro Petacchi, and Heinrich Haussler. The tactic was successful; BMC Racing Team and Liquigas-Cannondale, along with Omega Pharma–Lotto and FDJ, effectively drove the leading group such that their advantage never fell below one minute. Nibali tried to attack for victory on the Poggio, knowing that even among the small group that was left he was not likely to have the best finishing sprint. Seven riders followed his acceleration, and all seven eventually passed him, leaving Nibali eighth on the day. After Peter Sagan had shown strong form at Gent–Wevelgem, the squad was touted as fielding contenders at the second monument race, the Tour of Flanders. The squad failed to be at all competitive, however; only Koren and Oss finished the race, with six others, including Sagan, abandoning before the conclusion. Their best-placed rider being 95th was criticized as a major disappointment. Nibali rode Liège–Bastogne–Liège as his final tune-up prior to the Giro d'Italia. While race winner Philippe Gilbert and the Schleck brothers, who rounded out the podium with the Belgian, slipped away on the Côte de Roche aux Faucons and were not caught, Nibali instigated the chase group that formed on the Côte de Saint-Nicolas. He finished eighth. Afterward, he said he was satisfied with his performance, since he had not gone into the red to follow Gilbert and the Schlecks and put in a good ride on the last climb. He was, however, spent from his effort on the Côte de Saint-Nicolas and could not sprint for fourth place.

The team also sent squads to the Montepaschi Strade Bianche, the GP Miguel Indurain, Paris–Roubaix, the Amstel Gold Race, La Flèche Wallonne and the Giro di Toscana, but placed no higher than 11th in any of these races.

=== Fall races ===
The team also sent squads to the Clásica de San Sebastián, Tre Valli Varesine, Trofeo Melinda, GP Ouest-France, the Grand Prix Cycliste de Montréal, the Memorial Marco Pantani, the Gran Premio Bruno Beghelli and the Amstel Curaçao Race, but placed no higher than 11th in any of these races.

== Stage races ==
The team won two minor classifications at the Giro della Provincia di Reggio Calabria in January, Oss the youth classification and the squad the teams classification. In February, Peter Sagan was dominant at the Giro di Sardegna, winning three stages with three different sorts of rides. He took stage 1 from a 25-strong group sprint after a proper leadout by Capecchi and Oss, finishing a full bike length ahead of Alessandro Ballan in second. While he lost his race lead after stage 2 when he finished two seconds behind an attacking Damiano Cunego and José Serpa, Sagan reclaimed it with a similar move in stage 3. With an uphill sprint finish shaping up, Sagan attacked and drew Cunego and Serpa with him, the three of them finishing two seconds clear of the best of the scattered groups that finished behind them. The fourth stage was flat and seemed suited for a full field sprint, but Sagan slipped away in the final kilometer to finish a second ahead of the fast-charging sprinters at the head of the peloton, for his third win. He ceded a little time back to Cunego and Serpa in the hilly stage 5, but still won the race overall by three seconds over Serpa and seven over Cunego; also winning the points classification in the process. While Basso had hoped for overall success at Tirreno–Adriatico, he failed to be a major factor at any point, and finished fourth overall. Nibali was fifth, and the squad won the teams classification. Guarnieri won the early afternoon short road race on the last day of the Three Days of De Panne. Sagan took a stage win at the Tour of California for the second year in a row. The young Slovakian was best of a 45-rider group that finished together at the head of the four-climb stage. He also won the sprints classification for the second year in a row, thanks to high placings on other stages in addition to his win. On the whole, however, his climbing legs were not as good as they had been in 2010, since he finished the race in 35th place over 20 minutes down in the overall. He was also just fourth-best in the youth classification.

The team also won lesser classifications at the Tour de Suisse, the Tour of Slovenia, the Tour de Pologne, the USA Pro Cycling Challenge, and the Giro di Padania. The team also sent squads to the Tour Down Under, the Tour de San Luis, Paris–Nice, the Settimana internazionale di Coppi e Bartali, Volta a Catalunya, the Tour of the Basque Country, the Giro del Trentino, the Tour of Turkey, the Tour de Romandie, the Tour de Luxembourg, the Critérium du Dauphiné, the Eneco Tour and the Tour of Utah, but did not achieve a stage win, classification win, or podium finish in any of them.

== Grand Tours ==
=== Giro d'Italia ===
Reigning Giro champion Basso will not defend his title, preferring to focus on the Tour de France. He had for a time considered riding the Giro in a supporting role to Nibali, who will ride as the squad's captain. Team management decided that in the interests of respecting the race, they would not have Basso ride but be unable (due to saving himself for the Tour) to give full effort in the Giro's most difficult stages.

== Season victories ==
| Date | Race | Competition | Rider | Country | Location |
|---|---|---|---|---|---|
| January 30 | Giro della Provincia di Reggio Calabria, Young rider classification | UCI Europe Tour | Daniel Oss (ITA) | Italy | |
| January 30 | Giro della Provincia di Reggio Calabria, Teams classification | UCI Europe Tour | (Note: The riders on the squad were Maciej Bodnar, Damiano Caruso, Tiziano Dall'Antonia, Mauro Da Dalto, Ted King, Paolo Longo Borghini, Daniel Oss, and Maciej Paterski) | Italy | |
| February 5 | Gran Premio della Costa Etruschi | UCI Europe Tour | Elia Viviani (ITA) | Italy | Donoratico |
| February 11 | Tour de Mumbai I | UCI Asia Tour | Elia Viviani (ITA) | India | Mumbai |
| February 22 | Giro di Sardegna, Stage 1 | UCI Europe Tour | Peter Sagan (SVK) | Italy | Porto Cervo |
| February 24 | Giro di Sardegna, Stage 3 | UCI Europe Tour | Peter Sagan (SVK) | Italy | Lanusei |
| February 25 | Giro di Sardegna, Stage 4 | UCI Europe Tour | Peter Sagan (SVK) | Italy | Oristano |
| February 26 | Giro di Sardegna, Overall | UCI Europe Tour | Peter Sagan (SVK) | Italy | |
| February 26 | Giro di Sardegna, Points classification | UCI Europe Tour | Peter Sagan (SVK) | Italy | |
| February 27 | Gran Premio di Lugano | UCI Europe Tour | Ivan Basso (ITA) | Switzerland | Lugano |
| March 15 | Tirreno–Adriatico, Teams classification | UCI World Tour | (Note: The riders on the squad were Ivan Basso, Vincenzo Nibali, Maciej Bodnar, Damiano Caruso, Tiziano Dall'Antonia, Jacopo Guarnieri, Alan Marangoni, and Daniel Oss) | Italy | |
| March 31 | Three Days of De Panne, Stage 3a | UCI Europe Tour | Jacopo Guarnieri (ITA) | Belgium | De Panne |
| May 19 | Tour of California, Stage 5 | UCI America Tour | Peter Sagan (SVK) | United States | Paso Robles |
| May 22 | Tour of California, Sprints classification | UCI America Tour | Peter Sagan (SVK) | United States | |
| May 24 | Giro d'Italia, Stage 16 | UCI World Tour | Vincenzo Nibali (ITA) | Italy | Nevegal |
| May 26 | Giro d'Italia, Stage 18 | UCI World Tour | Eros Capecchi (ITA) | Italy | San Pellegrino Terme |
| May 29 | Giro d'Italia, Fair Play Teams classification | UCI World Tour | (Note: Six-way tie with Androni Giocattoli, HTC–Highroad, Quick-Step, BMC Racing Team, and Colnago–CSF Inox) | Italy | |
| June 13 | Tour de Suisse, Stage 3 | UCI World Tour | Peter Sagan (SVK) | Switzerland | Grindelwald |
| June 17 | Tour of Slovenia, Stage 1 | UCI Europe Tour | Elia Viviani (ITA) | Slovenia | Nova Gorica |
| June 18 | Tour de Suisse, Stage 8 | UCI World Tour | Peter Sagan (SVK) | Switzerland | Schaffhausen |
| June 19 | Tour of Slovenia, Points classification | UCI Europe Tour | Kristjan Koren (SLO) | Slovenia | |
| June 19 | Tour de Suisse, Points classification | UCI World Tour | Peter Sagan (SVK) | Switzerland | |
| July 2 | GP Kranj | UCI Europe Tour | Simone Ponzi (ITA) | Slovenia | Kranj |
| July 15 | Coppa Città di Stresa | UCI Europe Tour | Elia Viviani (ITA) | Italy | Stresa |
| July 16 | Coppa Papà Carlo | UCI Europe Tour | Simone Ponzi (ITA) | Italy | Stresa |
| August 3 | Tour de Pologne, Stage 4 | UCI World Tour | Peter Sagan (SVK) | Poland | Cieszyn |
| August 4 | Tour de Pologne, Stage 5 | UCI World Tour | Peter Sagan (SVK) | Poland | Zakopane |
| August 6 | Tour de Pologne, Overall | UCI World Tour | Peter Sagan (SVK) | Poland | |
| August 6 | Tour de Pologne, Points classification | UCI World Tour | Peter Sagan (SVK) | Poland | |
| August 25 | Vuelta a España, Stage 6 | UCI World Tour | Peter Sagan (SVK) | Spain | Córdoba |
| August 26 | USA Pro Cycling Challenge, Stage 4 | UCI America Tour | Elia Viviani (ITA) | United States | Steamboat Springs |
| August 27 | USA Pro Cycling Challenge, Stage 5 | UCI America Tour | Elia Viviani (ITA) | United States | Breckenridge |
| August 28 | USA Pro Cycling Challenge, Stage 6 | UCI America Tour | Daniel Oss (ITA) | United States | Denver |
| August 28 | USA Pro Cycling Challenge, Points classification | UCI America Tour | Elia Viviani (ITA) | United States | |
| September 1 | Vuelta a España, Stage 12 | UCI World Tour | Peter Sagan (SVK) | Spain | Pontevedra |
| September 7 | Giro di Padania, Stage 2 | UCI Europe Tour | Elia Viviani (ITA) | Italy | Vigevano |
| September 9 | Giro di Padania, Stage 4 | UCI Europe Tour | Ivan Basso (ITA) | Italy | San Valentino di Brentonico |
| September 10 | Giro di Padania, Overall | UCI Europe Tour | Ivan Basso (ITA) | Italy | |
| September 10 | Giro di Padania, Points classification | UCI Europe Tour | Elia Viviani (ITA) | Italy | |
| September 10 | Giro di Padania, Sprint classification | UCI Europe Tour | Elia Viviani (ITA) | Italy | |
| September 11 | Vuelta a España, Stage 21 | UCI World Tour | Peter Sagan (SVK) | Spain | Madrid |
| September 18 | Gran Premio Industria e Commercio di Prato | UCI Europe Tour | Peter Sagan (SVK) | Italy | Prato |
| October 8 | Tour of Beijing, Stage 4 | UCI World Tour | Elia Viviani (ITA) | China | Shunyi |
