= 2014 Cannondale season =

Cannondale
- 2014 season
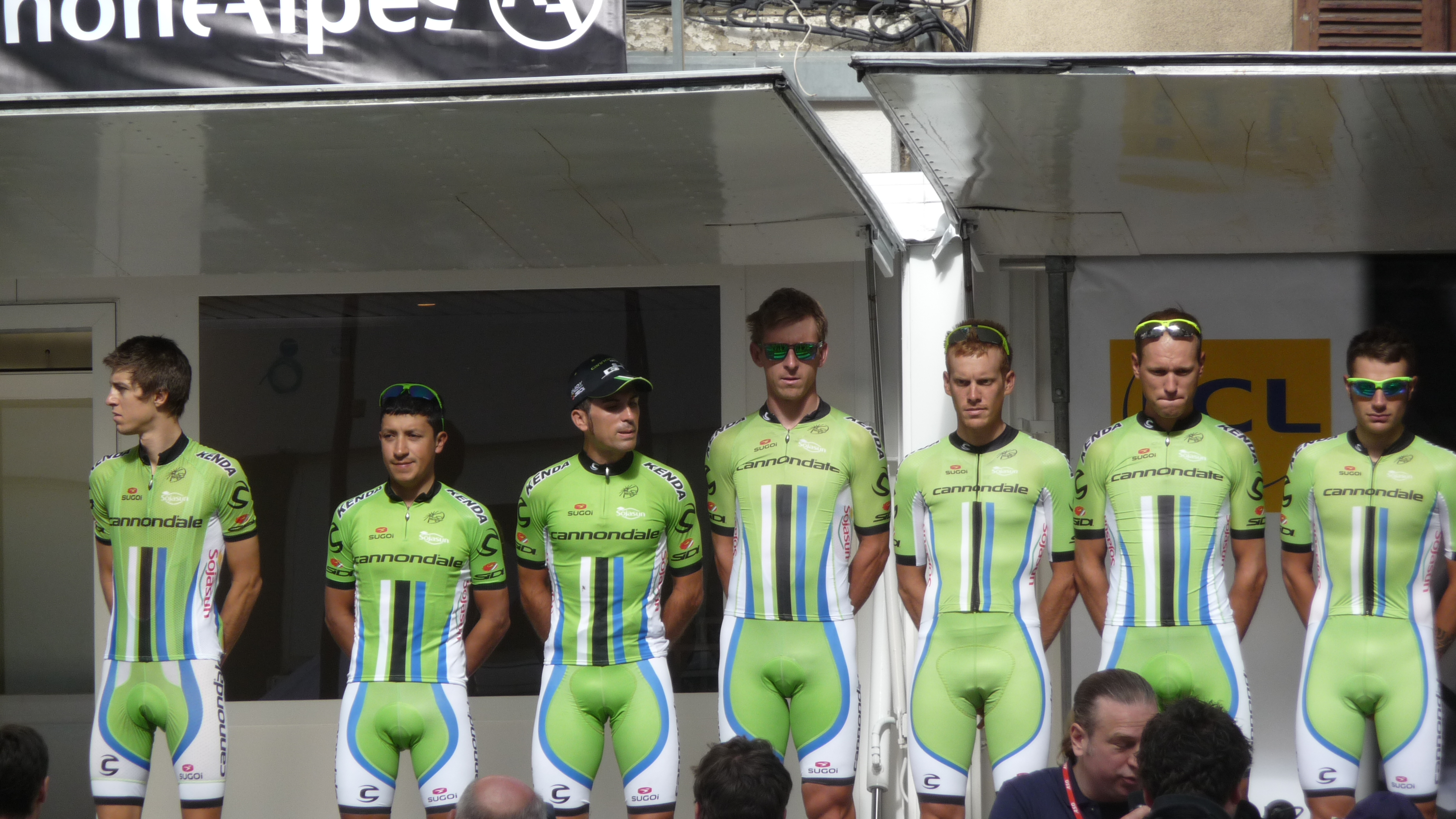
- The team at the 2014 Critérium du Dauphiné
- UCI code: CAN
- Status: UCI ProTeam
- World Tour Rank: 17th (456 points)
- Manager: Roberto Amadio
- Main sponsor(s): Cannondale
- Bicycles: Cannondale
- Groupset: SRAM

Season victories
- One-day races: 2
- Stage race overall: -
- Stage race stages: 14
- National Championships: 1
- Most wins: Peter Sagan (6 wins)
- Best ranked rider: Peter Sagan (15th)

The 2014 season for Cannondale began in January with the Tour de San Luis. As a UCI ProTeam, Cannondale were automatically invited and obligated to send a squad to every event in the UCI World Tour.

== Team roster ==
As of 1 January 2014.

Rider	Date of birth
Ivan Basso (ITA)	26 November 1977 (aged 36)
George Bennett (NZL)	7 April 1990 (aged 23)
Alberto Bettiol (ITA)	29 October 1993 (aged 20)
Maciej Bodnar (POL)	7 March 1985 (aged 28)
Guillaume Boivin (CAN)	25 September 1989 (aged 24)
Damiano Caruso (ITA)	12 October 1987 (aged 26)
Alessandro De Marchi (ITA)	19 May 1986 (aged 27)
Davide Formolo (ITA)	24 October 1992 (aged 21)
Oscar Gatto (ITA)	1 January 1985 (aged 29)
Ted King (USA)	31 January 1983 (aged 30)
Michel Koch (GER)	15 October 1991 (aged 22)
Kristijan Koren (SLO)	25 November 1986 (aged 27)
Matthias Krizek (AUT)	29 September 1988 (aged 25)
Paolo Longo Borghini (ITA)	10 December 1980 (aged 33)

Rider	Date of birth
Alan Marangoni (ITA)	16 July 1984 (aged 29)
Marco Marcato (ITA)	11 February 1984 (aged 29)
Jean-Marc Marino (FRA)	15 August 1983 (aged 30)
Matej Mohorič (SLO)	19 October 1994 (aged 19)
Moreno Moser (ITA)	25 December 1990 (aged 23)
Daniele Ratto (ITA)	5 October 1989 (aged 24)
Fabio Sabatini (ITA)	18 February 1985 (aged 28)
Juraj Sagan (SVK)	23 December 1988 (aged 25)
Peter Sagan (SVK)	26 January 1990 (aged 23)
Cristiano Salerno (ITA)	18 February 1985 (aged 28)
Cayetano Sarmiento (COL)	28 March 1987 (aged 26)
Davide Villella (ITA)	27 June 1991 (aged 22)
Elia Viviani (ITA)	7 February 1989 (aged 24)
Cameron Wurf (AUS)	3 August 1983 (aged 30)

Riders who joined the team for the 2014 season

Rider	2013 team
George Bennett	RadioShack–Leopard
Alberto Bettiol	neo-pro (Mastromarco-Chianti Sensi)
Davide Formolo	neo-pro (Petroli Firenze-Wega)
Oscar Gatto	Vini Fantini–Selle Italia
Marco Marcato	Vacansoleil–DCM
Jean-Marc Marino	Sojasun
Matej Mohorič	Sava
Davide Villella	neo-pro (Team Colpack)

Riders who left the team during or after the 2013 season

Rider	2013 team
Stefano Agostini	Provisionally suspended
Federico Canuti	
Mauro Da Dalto	
Tiziano Dall'Antonia	
Lucas Sebastián Haedo	Skydive Dubai Pro Cycling
Nariyuki Masuda	Utsunomiya Blitzen
Maciej Paterski	CCC–Polsat–Polkowice
Brian Vandborg	Retired

== Season victories ==
Date	Race	Competition	Rider	Country	Location
21 February	Tour of Oman, Stage 4	UCI Asia Tour	Peter Sagan (SVK)	Oman	Ministry of Housing
14 March	Tirreno–Adriatico, Stage 3	UCI World Tour	Peter Sagan (SVK)	Italy	Arezzo
18 March	Tirreno–Adriatico, Points classification	UCI World Tour	Peter Sagan (SVK)	Italy	
28 March	E3 Harelbeke	UCI World Tour	Peter Sagan (SVK)	Belgium	Harelbeke
29 March	Settimana Internazionale di Coppi e Bartali, Stage 3	UCI Europe Tour	Elia Viviani (ITA)	Italy	Crevalcore
30 March	Volta a Catalunya, Sprints classification	UCI World Tour	Michel Koch (GER)	Spain	
30 March	Volta a Catalunya, Special sprints classification	UCI World Tour	Michel Koch (GER)	Spain	
1 April	Three Days of De Panne, Stage 1	UCI Europe Tour	Peter Sagan (SVK)	Belgium	Zottegem
3 April	Three Days of De Panne, Stage 3b	UCI Europe Tour	Maciej Bodnar (POL)	Belgium	De Panne
12 April	Tour of the Basque Country, Mountains classification	UCI World Tour	Davide Villella (ITA)	Spain	
1 May	Tour of Turkey, Stage 5	UCI Europe Tour	Elia Viviani (ITA)	Turkey	Turgutreis
3 May	Tour of Turkey, Stage 7	UCI Europe Tour	Elia Viviani (ITA)	Turkey	İzmir
17 May	Tour of California, Stage 7	UCI America Tour	Peter Sagan (SVK)	United States	Pasadena
18 May	Tour of California, Sprints classification	UCI America Tour	Peter Sagan (SVK)	United States	
1 June	Tour des Fjords, Teams classification	UCI Europe Tour	(Note: The riders on the squad were Alberto Bettiol, Alessandro De Marchi, Davide Formolo, Matthias Krizek, Marco Marcato and Jean-Marc Marino)	Norway	
1 June	Giro d'Italia, Premio Fair Play classification	UCI World Tour	(Note: The riders on the squad were Ivan Basso, Oscar Gatto, Michel Koch, Paolo Longo Borghini, Alan Marangoni, Moreno Moser, Daniele Ratto, Davide Villella and Elia Viviani)	Italy	
15 June	Critérium du Dauphiné, Mountains classification	UCI World Tour	Alessandro De Marchi (ITA)	France	
16 June	Tour de Suisse, Stage 3	UCI World Tour	Peter Sagan (SVK)	Switzerland	Heiden
22 June	Tour of Slovenia, Stage 4	UCI Europe Tour	Elia Viviani (ITA)	Slovenia	Novo Mesto
22 June	Tour de Suisse, Points classification	UCI World Tour	Peter Sagan (SVK)	Switzerland	
7 July	Tour of Austria, Stage 2	UCI Europe Tour	Oscar Gatto (ITA)	Austria	Bad Ischl
9 July	Tour of Austria, Stage 4	UCI Europe Tour	Oscar Gatto (ITA)	Austria	Matrei in Osttirol
27 July	Tour de France, Points classification	UCI World Tour	Peter Sagan (SVK)	France	
27 July	Tour de France, Super-combativity award	UCI World Tour	Alessandro De Marchi (ITA)	France	
9 August	Tour de Pologne, Most active rider classification	UCI World Tour	Matthias Krizek (AUT)	Poland	
17 August	Arctic Race of Norway, Young rider classification	UCI Europe Tour	Davide Villella (ITA)	Norway	
21 August	USA Pro Cycling Challenge, Stage 4	UCI America Tour	Elia Viviani (ITA)	United States	Colorado Springs
29 August	Vuelta a España, Stage 7	UCI World Tour	Alessandro De Marchi (ITA)	Spain	Alcaudete
16 September	Coppa Bernocchi	UCI Europe Tour	Elia Viviani (ITA)	Italy	Legnano
