= 2010 Liquigas–Doimo season =

2010 Liquigas–Doimo season
Manager	Roberto Amadio
One-day victories	9
Stage race overall victories	6
Stage race stage victories	23
Previous season • Next season

The 2010 season for Liquigas–Doimo began in January with the Tour de San Luis and ended in October at the Giro di Lombardia. As a UCI ProTour team, they were automatically invited and obliged to send a squad to every event in the ProTour.

The team won two of the season's three Grand Tours, the Giro d'Italia, with Ivan Basso and the Vuelta a España with Vincenzo Nibali. Franco Pellizotti was expected to ride both of the season's first two Grand Tours, but he was sidelined by the team after the UCI identified him as having irregular blood values as part of their biological passport program, values possibly indicative of doping. Pellizotti fought the charges, proclaiming his innocence, and was later cleared to return to racing. However, delays in his case meant that almost all of his 2010 season was wiped out.

== 2010 roster ==
Ages as of January 1, 2010.

Rider	Date of birth
Valerio Agnoli (ITA)	January 6, 1985 (aged 24)
Ivan Basso (ITA)	November 26, 1977 (aged 32)
Francesco Bellotti (ITA)	August 6, 1979 (aged 30)
Daniele Bennati (ITA)	September 24, 1980 (aged 29)
Maciej Bodnar (POL)	March 7, 1985 (aged 24)
Francesco Chicchi (ITA)	November 27, 1980 (aged 29)
Davide Cimolai (ITA)	August 13, 1989 (aged 20)
Tiziano Dall'Antonia (ITA)	July 26, 1983 (aged 26)
Mauro Finetto (ITA)	May 10, 1985 (aged 24)
Jacopo Guarnieri (ITA)	August 14, 1987 (aged 22)
Robert Kišerlovski (CRO)	August 9, 1986 (aged 23)
Kristjan Koren (SLO)	November 25, 1986 (aged 23)
Roman Kreuziger (CZE)	May 6, 1986 (aged 23)
Aleksandr Kuschynski (BLR)	October 27, 1979 (aged 30)

Rider	Date of birth
Vincenzo Nibali (ITA)	November 14, 1984 (aged 25)
Daniel Oss (ITA)	January 13, 1987 (aged 22)
Maciej Paterski (POL)	September 12, 1986 (aged 23)
Franco Pellizotti (ITA)	January 15, 1978 (aged 31)
Manuel Quinziato (ITA)	October 30, 1979 (aged 30)
Fabio Sabatini (ITA)	February 18, 1985 (aged 24)
Juraj Sagan (Note: Juraj Sagan joined the team on April 23) (SVK)	December 23, 1988 (aged 21)
Peter Sagan (SVK)	January 26, 1990 (aged 19)
Ivan Santaromita (ITA)	April 30, 1984 (aged 25)
Sylwester Szmyd (POL)	March 2, 1978 (aged 31)
Brian Vandborg (DEN)	April 30, 1982 (aged 27)
Alessandro Vanotti (ITA)	September 16, 1980 (aged 29)
Elia Viviani (ITA)	February 7, 1989 (aged 20)
Frederik Willems (BEL)	September 8, 1979 (aged 30)
Oliver Zaugg (SUI)	May 9, 1981 (aged 28)

Riders who joined the team for the 2010 season

Rider	2009 team
Francesco Bellotti	Barloworld
Davide Cimolai	neo-pro
Tiziano Dall'Antonia	CSF Group–Navigare
Mauro Finetto	CSF Group–Navigare
Robert Kišerlovski	Fuji–Servetto
Kristjan Koren	Perutnina Petuj
Maciej Paterski	neo-pro
Juraj Sagan	Dukla Merida Trenčín
Peter Sagan	Dukla Merida Trenčín
Elia Viviani	neo-pro

Riders who left the team during or after the 2009 season

Rider	2010 team
Kjell Carlström	Team Sky
Claudio Corioni	Free agent
Murilo Fischer	Garmin–Transitions
Enrico Franzoi	Powerplus BKCP
Vladimir Miholjević	Acqua & Sapone
Andrea Noè	Ceramica Flaminia
Gorazd Štangelj	Astana

== Stage races ==
The team sent a squad to the Tour de San Luis in mid-January, coming away with two stage wins. Chicchi won the mass sprint finish to the first stage, and Nibali followed with an individual time trial win in stage 4. The win put Nibali in the race leader's orange jersey, which he would retain through the conclusion of the event. The team was successful in stage hunting in Asia in February, with Chicchi winning two stages in the Tour of Qatar and Bennati one in the Tour of Oman. Later in February, Kreuziger won the most difficult stage of the Giro di Sardegna en route to the overall victory. The Giro di Sardegna was mostly composed of flat stages; the top three finishers in the hilly second stage (Kreuziger, Chris Horner, and Thomas Voeckler) finished in that same order in the final overall standings, showing how little the standings changed on the other days.

== Grand Tours ==
=== Giro d'Italia ===
Liquigas-Doimo entered the Giro with Basso a strong favorite for overall victory. Pellizotti was supposed to ride the Giro as a co-captain, but he was forcibly sidelined as a result of his announced irregular blood values as part of the UCI's biological passport program. Nibali, who had been planning to captain the squad sent to the partially concurrent Tour of California, took his place in the Giro.

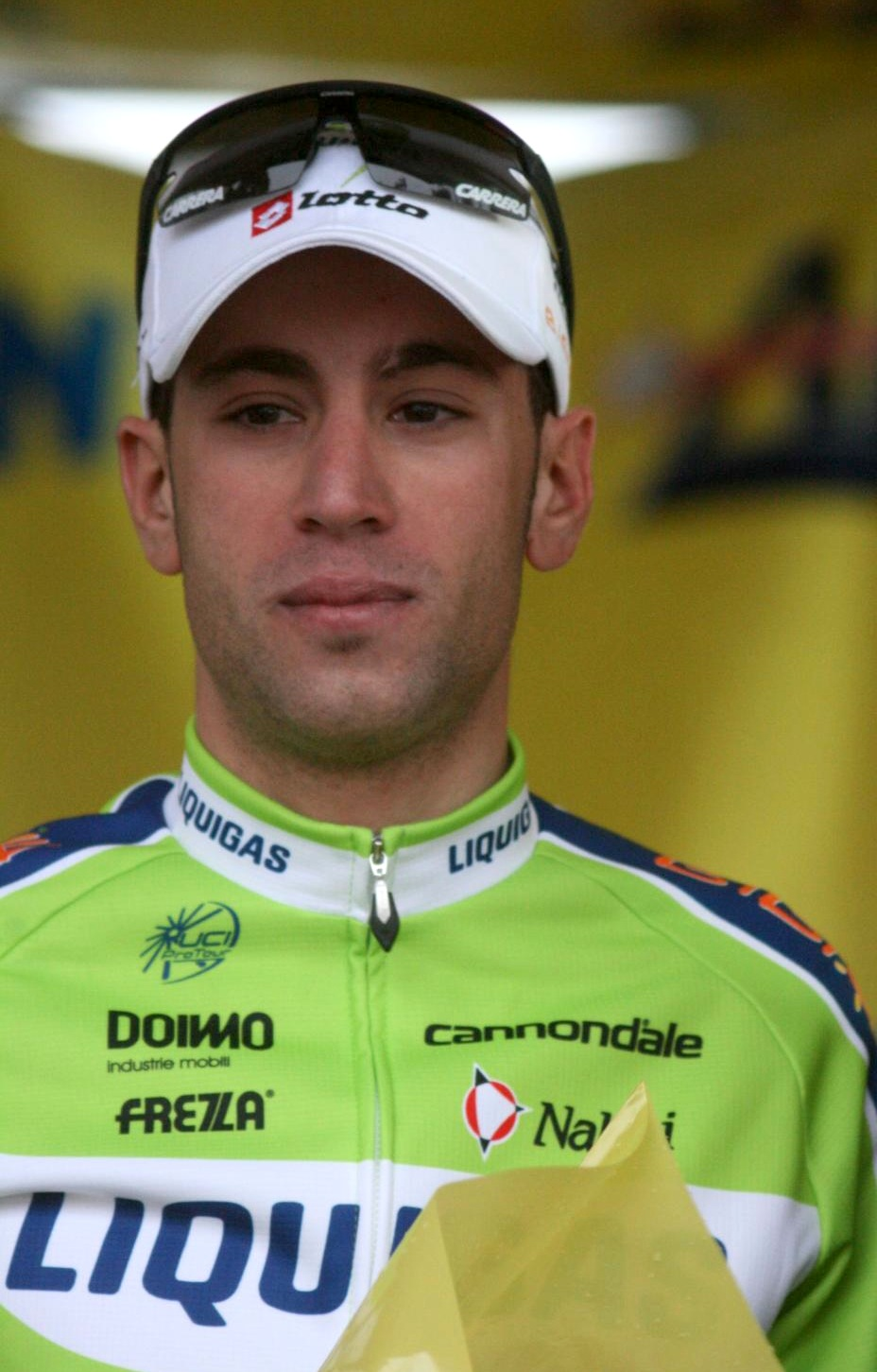
Vincenzo Nibali did not originally plan to ride the Giro, but he finished the race in third overall.

Sabatini was the best sprinter the team sent to the Giro, and he contested the Giro's first road race stage with the leading sprinters, taking third in the bunch finish. The next day, in another depleted bunch finish, Nibali was eighth. He had made the finishing selection both days, and was fourth in the overall classification prior to the transfer to Italy, five seconds back of race leader Alexander Vinokourov in the standings. In the stage 4 team time trial, the squad took a convincing victory, finishing the 32.5 km (20.2 mi) course with six riders together (the seventh, Bodnar, had fallen off the pace only in the final kilometer) in 36'37". Only two other squads finished in under 37 minutes. Vinokourov's Astana team was 38 seconds off the pace. Garmin–Transitions and Team Saxo Bank, who had also had riders ahead of Nibali in the classification prior to the stage, also finished well back on the day, meaning Nibali took the pink jersey.

Nibali stayed out of trouble and retained the jersey over the next two days, but was bound for difficulties in stage 7. This was a long stage, incorporating unpaved roads near the finish, and happened to be run on a day with very heavy rainfall. Nibali crashed on the first section of unpaved road, and needed a bike change. Vinokourov seized the opportunity to take off, and he finished, along with Cadel Evans and Damiano Cunego, sufficiently ahead of Nibali to re-take the pink jersey. Basso also crashed during this stage; the day's results took them from first and second overall down to fifth (Nibali) and eighth (Basso). The favorites finished together over the next three days. Attrition from other riders moved Nibali and Basso up to third and fourth overall, but their time gaps to Vinokourov were unchanged. In stage 11, a 50-rider group broke away from the peloton. This group contained several noteworthy riders, such as youth classification leader (and eventual winner) Richie Porte and squad leaders Carlos Sastre and Bradley Wiggins. Liquigas did have Dall'Antonia, Kišerlovski, and Agnoli in the break, but Basso and Nibali were notably left behind and ceded 13 minutes to this group. This moved them both, along with fellow overall favorites like Evans, Cunego, and Michele Scarponi, out of the top ten with more than ten minutes in deficit to new race leader Porte. Kišerlovski and Agnoli both moved into the top ten, though, at third and fifth, respectively. Liquigas-Doimo, Astana, Acqua & Sapone, and BMC Racing Team had all been mounting a chase of this breakaway group for a time, a chase which brought their advantage from 20 minutes down to 13. The teamwork abruptly stopped when Liquigas-Doimo stopped sending riders to the front of the peloton. The teams blamed each other for the peloton's failure on the day, and there was speculation that Liquigas-Doimo, fielding strong favorites for overall victory, had given away the Giro after the day's result. Basso later admitted that they had made a potentially grave mistake giving this group as much time as they had.

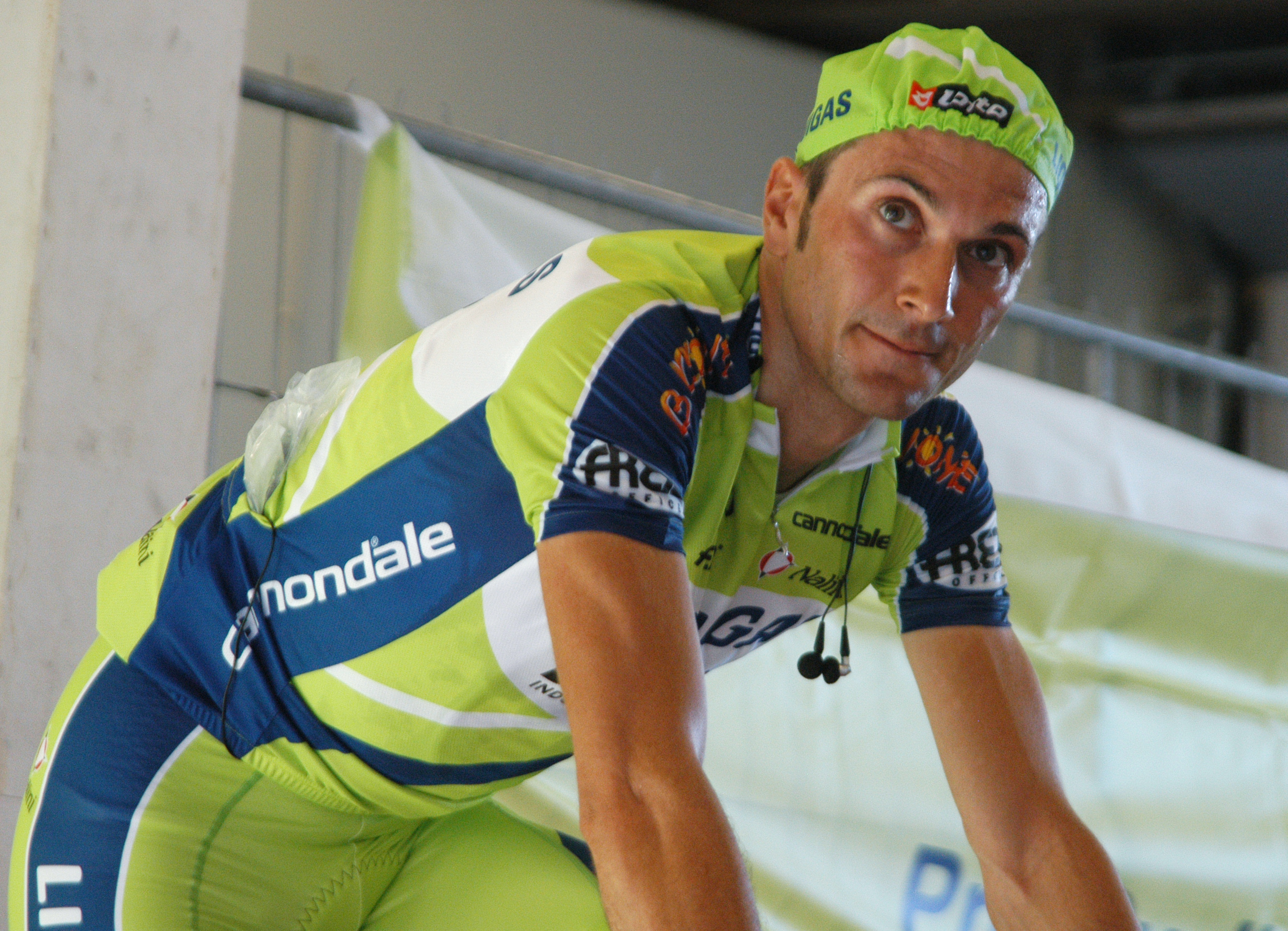
Ivan Basso won the Giro for the second time in his career.

Stage 12 had the makings of a fairly straightforward sprint stage, but in the last kilometers of the stage, a 10-rider group consisting largely of Giro favorites split off the peloton and finished ahead of them. Nibali and Basso both made this selection, safely finishing sixth and tenth respectively on the day. The squad went to work in stage 14, which went over Monte Grappa. Using rider after rider, until each bonked and fell off the pace, the squad set a pace on the climb that eventually whittled the leading group down to just Nibali, Basso, Evans, and Scarponi. Nibali took the most aggressive descent down the Grappa and soloed to victory 23 seconds ahead of the other three, and 2'25" ahead of the peloton. This result put Nibali back in the top ten overall. Using much the same strategy in the Monte Zoncolan climb the next day, Basso was the last rider left out front as the stage neared its finish. He put in attack after attack to try to shed Evans in the stage's final kilometers, at last succeeding to take the win 1'19" ahead of the Australian. This result moved Basso from 11th all the way to third in the overall standings, while Nibali also moved up, to seventh. Both squad leaders turned in solid rides in the uphill time trial to Plan de Corones in stage 16, each moving up a place in the general classification. Stage 18 was the last mass finish in the Giro, and the squad took two of the top ten places in the sprint, with Dall'Antonia coming in third and Sabatini ninth.

The Giro's last two road race stages were very climbing-intensive. The first of them finished at Aprica, where Basso had previously won when he won his first Giro championship in 2006. Much like they had on the Grappa and the Zoncolan, the squad used up its support riders one at a time to set a selective pace. Nibali, Basso, and Scarponi were the last three riders together at the front of the race, topping the Passo del Mortirolo several minutes ahead of race leader David Arroyo and other riders. Basso rode a conservative descent on the Aprica, with the other two needing to wait for him several times. Arroyo rode a very aggressive descent, catching four riders between him and the leading Italian trio. They coalesced into a five-man chase group before the Aprica climb. Basso, Nibali, and Scarponi held only half a minute's advantage on the Arroyo group when the climb began. Basso and Nibali both took long, strenuous turns on the front of their group, and their time gap over the Arroyo group grew large enough for Basso to become the prospective race leader. Scarponi did very little work on the climb, and as such was the freshest at the finish and easily took the stage win. Nibali allowed Basso second place in order to maximize his time bonus. Arroyo's group did not cross the finish line until over three minutes had passed, giving Basso the race leadership and putting Nibali in third overall. The squad, by this point the only squad still fully intact, controlled the race effectively on the Giro's final road race stage. Basso, Scarponi, and Evans rode the stage-concluding Passo del Tonale ahead of the other Giro elite, including Nibali. Scarponi's 18-second gap over Nibali put him one second from taking the third step on the podium from Nibali, but Nibali was a much stronger time trialist, securing his position in the stage 21 time trial in Verona. Basso had over a minute in advantage to Arroyo at this point, so the time trial had a celebratory feel to it for him. He finished the stage in 15th place, but easily won the Giro with this performance, gleefully meeting his family inside the Arena di Verona before taking the final pink jersey. The squad was dominant, winning both the Trofeo Fast Team and Trofeo Super Team classifications. They also won the Fair Play award, avoiding penalty points for minor technical infringements, and were the only squad to have all nine riders complete the race.

=== Tour de France ===
Giro champion Basso, along with Kreuziger, led the team's squad for the Tour de France. Basso hoped to pull a Giro/Tour double, which would have been the first since Marco Pantani in 1998, but was happy simply to return to the race for the first time since finishing second overall in the 2005 edition. Kreuziger was to be his lieutenant, and several experienced domestiques rounded the squad.

There were numerous crashes in the Tour's first two road race stages. Basso crashed in stage 1, and Kreuziger was one of dozens of riders to crash on the Col du Stockeu in Spa in stage 2. At this point, Kreuziger was 17th and Basso 53rd. They both lost further time on the cobblestones in stage 3. In a more typical flat stage in stage 4, Oss took eighth in the bunch finish. Basso and Kreuziger both finished with the group of overall race favorites in stage 8, the Tour's first major mountain stage. While they lost ten seconds to Andy Schleck and Samuel Sánchez, the result moved Basso up 14 places in the general classification, going from 27th to 13th, and Kreuziger from 12th up to 7th. Basso finished a minute ahead of Kreuziger in stage 9, moving up to 10th overall while Kreuziger slipped to 11th.

Following stages won by sprinters and breakaways, the otherwise flat stage 12 ended with a short, steep climb to Mende, opening up the possibility for changes to the overall standings. Kreuziger and Basso both lost time in this stage, with Kreuziger ceding 15 seconds to stage winner Joaquim Rodríguez and to Alberto Contador, while Basso lost 31. They switched places in the overall standings as a result, with Basso falling to 11th and Kreuziger moving up to 10th. In the high mountain stage 14, Basso was just 21st at the finish, but due to attrition of other riders, he again moved back into 10th place overall with this result. Kreuziger was 28th, and fell to 12th overall. Both leaders rode poorly in stage 15, on the Port de Balès. Kreuziger was 19th on the day, losing a little over a minute to the race's elite. Basso was 32nd, nearly three minutes off the pace. Vandborg, however, was tenth on this stage after having been part of the morning breakaway. Two stages later, in the summit stage finish at the Col du Tourmalet, Kreuziger again returned to the top ten overall, taking tenth on the day. He finished in that position upon the Tour's conclusion. Basso, for his part, had come down with bronchitis upon the Tour's entry to the Pyrenees, ceding time in each of the mountain stages in the final week. Antibiotics given him by race doctors also weakened his form. His most dramatic time loss came in stage 16 to Pau, when he was 35 minutes back of stage winner Pierrick Fédrigo, finishing with the last group on the road. He nonetheless finished the race, coming in 32nd, just under an hour back of Tour champion Contador. The squad was ninth in the teams classification.

== Season victories ==
Date	Race	Competition	Rider	Country	Location
January 18	Tour de San Luis, Stage 1	UCI America Tour	Francesco Chicchi (ITA)	Argentina	Villa Mercedes
January 21	Tour de San Luis, Stage 4	UCI America Tour	Vincenzo Nibali (ITA)	Argentina	San Luis
January 24	Tour de San Luis, Overall	UCI America Tour	Vincenzo Nibali (ITA)	Argentina	
February 2	Giro della Provincia di Reggio Calabria, Youth classification	UCI Europe Tour	Daniel Oss (ITA)	Italy	
February 10	Tour of Qatar, Stage 4	UCI Asia Tour	Francesco Chicchi (ITA)	Qatar	Al Khor
February 12	Tour of Qatar, Stage 6	UCI Asia Tour	Francesco Chicchi (ITA)	Qatar	Doha
February 15	Tour of Oman, Stage 2	UCI Asia Tour	Daniele Bennati (ITA)	Oman	Samail
February 24	Giro di Sardegna, Stage 2	UCI Europe Tour	Roman Kreuziger (CZE)	Italy	Nuoro
February 27	Giro di Sardegna, Overall	UCI Europe Tour	Roman Kreuziger (CZE)	Italy	
March 10	Paris–Nice, Stage 3	UCI World Ranking	Peter Sagan (SVK)	France	Aurillac
March 12	Paris–Nice, Stage 5	UCI World Ranking	Peter Sagan (SVK)	France	Aix-en-Provence
March 12	Tirreno–Adriatico, Stage 3	UCI World Ranking	Daniele Bennati (ITA)	Italy	Monsummano Terme
March 14	Paris–Nice, Points classification	UCI World Ranking	Peter Sagan (SVK)	France	
March 14	Paris–Nice, Youth classification	UCI World Ranking	Roman Kreuziger (CZE)	France	
March 23	Settimana Internazionale di Coppi e Bartali, Stage 1A	UCI Europe Tour	Francesco Chicchi (ITA)	Italy	Riccione
March 23	Settimana Internazionale di Coppi e Bartali, Stage 1B	UCI Europe Tour	Team time trial (Note: The riders on the squad were Francesco Chicchi, Davide Cimolai, Mauro Finetto, Oliver Zaugg, Tiziano Dall'Antonia, Alessandro Vanotti, Ivan Santaromita, and Maciej Bodnar)	Italy	Riccione
March 23	Settimana Internazionale di Coppi e Bartali, Overall	UCI Europe Tour	Ivan Santaromita (ITA)	Italy	
April 17	Presidential Cycling Tour of Turkey, Stage 7	UCI Europe Tour	Elia Viviani (ITA)	Turkey	Antalya
April 25	Giro dell'Appennino	UCI Europe Tour	Robert Kišerlovski (CRO)	Italy	Pontedecimo
April 28	Tour de Romandie, Stage 1	UCI ProTour	Peter Sagan (SVK)	Switzerland	Fleurier
May 12	Giro d'Italia, Stage 4	UCI World Ranking	Team time trial (Note: The riders on the squad were Ivan Basso, Vincenzo Nibali, Valerio Agnoli, Maciej Bodnar, Tiziano Dall'Antonia, Robert Kišerlovski, Fabio Sabatini, Sylwester Szmyd and Alessandro Vanotti)	Italy	Cuneo
May 19	Tour of California, Stage 4	UCI America Tour	Francesco Chicchi (ITA)	United States	Modesto
May 20	Tour of California, Stage 5	UCI America Tour	Peter Sagan (SVK)	United States	Bakersfield
May 21	Tour of California, Stage 6	UCI America Tour	Peter Sagan (SVK)	United States	Big Bear Lake
May 22	Giro d'Italia, Stage 14	UCI World Ranking	Vincenzo Nibali (ITA)	Italy	Asolo (Monte Grappa)
May 23	Giro d'Italia, Stage 15	UCI World Ranking	Ivan Basso (ITA)	Italy	Monte Zoncolan
May 23	Tour of California, Sprints classification	UCI America Tour	Peter Sagan (SVK)	United States	
May 23	Tour of California, Youth classification	UCI America Tour	Peter Sagan (SVK)	United States	
May 30	Giro d'Italia, Overall	UCI World Ranking	Ivan Basso (ITA)	Italy	
May 30	Giro d'Italia, Trofeo Fast Team classification	UCI World Ranking		Italy	
May 30	Giro d'Italia, Trofeo Super Team classification	UCI World Ranking		Italy	
May 30	Giro d'Italia, Fair Play classification	UCI World Ranking		Italy	
June 19	Tour of Slovenia, Stage 3	UCI Europe Tour	Vincenzo Nibali (ITA)	Slovenia	Krvavec
June 20	Tour of Slovenia, Stage 4	UCI Europe Tour	Francesco Chicchi (ITA)	Slovenia	Novo Mesto
June 20	Tour of Slovenia, Overall	UCI Europe Tour	Vincenzo Nibali (ITA)	Slovenia	
August 1	Tour de Pologne, Stage 1	UCI ProTour	Jacopo Guarnieri (ITA)	Poland	Warsaw
August 5	Gran Premio Industria e Commercio Artigianato Carnaghese	UCI Europe Tour	Ivan Basso (ITA)	Italy	Carnago
August 5	Gran Premio Città di Camaiore	UCI Europe Tour	Kristjan Koren (SLO)	Italy	Camaiore
August 8	Vuelta a Burgos, Teams classification	UCI Europe Tour	(Note: The riders on the squad were Valerio Agnoli, Oliver Zaugg, Davide Cimolai, Mauro Finetto, Robert Kišerlovski, Vincenzo Nibali, Ivan Santaromita, and Frederik Willems)	Spain	
August 21	Trofeo Melinda	UCI Europe Tour	Vincenzo Nibali (ITA)	Italy	Trentino-Alto Adige/Südtirol
August 28	Giro del Veneto	UCI Europe Tour	Daniel Oss (ITA)	Italy	Castelfranco Veneto
September 18	Gran Premio Città di Modena	UCI Europe Tour	Francesco Chicchi (ITA)	Italy	Modena
September 19	Vuelta a España, Overall	UCI World Ranking	Vincenzo Nibali (ITA)	Spain	
September 19	Vuelta a España, Combination classification	UCI World Ranking	Vincenzo Nibali (ITA)	Spain	
September 25	Memorial Marco Pantani	UCI Europe Tour	Elia Viviani (ITA)	Italy	Cesenatico
September 26	Giro della Toscana	UCI Europe Tour	Daniele Bennati (ITA)	Italy	Arezzo
October 1	Circuit Franco-Belge, Stage 2	UCI Europe Tour	Jacopo Guarnieri (ITA)	Belgium	Poperinge
October 3	Circuit Franco-Belge, Teams classification	UCI Europe Tour	(Note: The riders on the squad were Francesco Chicchi, Davide Cimolai, Tiziano Dall'antonia, Jacopo Guarnieri, Fabio Sabatini, Juraj Sagan, Elia Viviani, and Maciej Paterski)	Belgium	
October 5	Memorial Frank Vandenbroucke	UCI Europe Tour	Elia Viviani (ITA)	Belgium	Binche
