= Real Cycling Team =

Cycling team

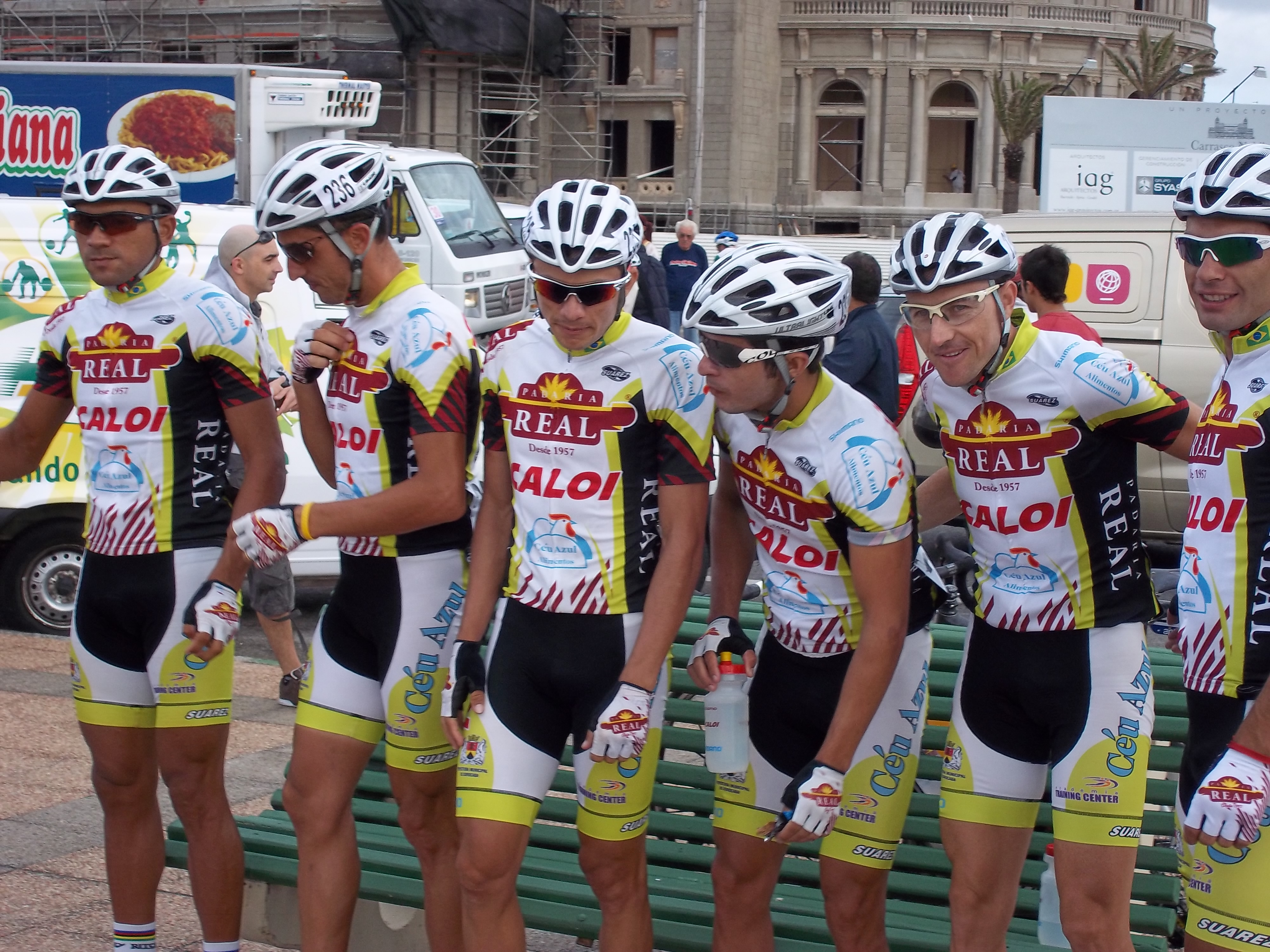

Team information
- UCI code: RCT
- Registered: Brazil
- Founded: 2005
- Disbanded: 2012
- Discipline: Road
- Status: Amateur (2005–2011); UCI Continental (2012)

Key personnel
- General manager: José Souza
- Team manager: Karina Pettinatti

Team name history
- 2005–2011 2012: Pada Real; Real Cycling Team

The Real Cycling Team was a Brazilian UCI Continental cycling team that existed from 2005 until 2012. The team was amateur status from 2005 to 2011 and UCI Continental in 2012. The team won the team ranking of the 2011-12 UCI America Tour.
