= 2012 Tour of Oman =

Race details
- Dates: 14–19 February
- Stages: 6
- Distance: 875 km (544 mi)
- Winning time: 21h 32' 02"

Results
Jersey awarded to the overall winner	Winner	Peter Velits (Slovakia)	(Omega Pharma–Quick-Step)
	Second	Vincenzo Nibali (Italy)	(Liquigas–Cannondale)
	Third	Tony Gallopin (France)	(RadioShack–Nissan)
Jersey awarded to the points classification winner	Points	Peter Sagan (Slovakia)	(Liquigas–Cannondale)
Jersey awarded to the young rider classification winner	Young rider	Tony Gallopin (France)	(RadioShack–Nissan)
	Team	RadioShack–Nissan	

The 2012 Tour of Oman was the third edition of the Tour of Oman cycling stage race. It was rated as a 2.1 event on the UCI Asia Tour, and was held from 14 to 19 February 2012, in Oman.

The race was won by Slovakia's Peter Velits, of the Omega Pharma–Quick-Step team, taking the race lead on the penultimate day and holding it to the finish. Velits' winning margin over runner-up Vincenzo Nibali (Liquigas–Cannondale) – winner of the race's queen stage to Jabal al Akhdar – was just one second, after Nibali tried to gain bonus seconds at one of the final day's intermediate sprints but could not gain time. The final place on the podium went to RadioShack–Nissan's Tony Gallopin, sixteen seconds behind Nibali and 17 seconds down on Velits. In the race's other classifications, Peter Sagan of Liquigas–Cannondale won the points classification on the final stage, Gallopin won the white jersey for the youth classification with his third place overall in the general classification, BMC Racing Team's Klaas Lodewyck won the combative classification for the race's intermediate sprints, and RadioShack–Nissan finished at the head of the teams classification.

== Teams ==
Sixteen teams competed in the 2012 Tour of Oman. These included eleven UCI ProTour teams, three UCI Professional Continental teams, and two Continental teams. The teams participating in the race were:

- BMC Racing Team
- Bridgestone–Anchor
- Champion System
- Farnese Vini–Selle Italia
- FDJ–BigMat
- Garmin–Barracuda
- RTS Racing Team
- GreenEDGE
- Team Katusha
- Liquigas–Cannondale
- Lotto–Belisol
- Omega Pharma–Quick-Step
- Rabobank
- RadioShack–Nissan
- Project 1t4i
- Team Sky

== Stages ==
=== Stage 1 ===
14 February 2012 – Al Alam Palace to Wadi Al Huwqayn, 159 km (98.8 mi)

Stage 1 Result

	Rider	Team	Time
1	André Greipel (GER)	Lotto–Belisol	3h 26' 09"
2	Denis Galimzyanov (RUS)	Team Katusha	s.t.
3	Tyler Farrar (USA)	Garmin–Barracuda	s.t.
4	Marcel Kittel (GER)	Project 1t4i	s.t.
5	Peter Sagan (SVK)	Liquigas–Cannondale	s.t.
6	Nacer Bouhanni (FRA)	FDJ–BigMat	s.t.
7	Daniel Oss (ITA)	Liquigas–Cannondale	s.t.
8	Andrea Guardini (ITA)	Farnese Vini–Selle Italia	s.t.
9	Tony Gallopin (FRA)	RadioShack–Nissan	s.t.
10	Matthew Goss (AUS)	GreenEDGE	s.t.

General Classification after Stage 1

	Cyclist	Team	Time
1	André Greipel (GER)	Lotto–Belisol	3h 25' 59"
2	Denis Galimzyanov (RUS)	Team Katusha	+ 4"
3	Tyler Farrar (USA)	Garmin–Barracuda	+ 6"
4	Alexandre Lemair (FRA)	Bridgestone–Anchor	+ 8"
5	Mikhail Ignatiev (RUS)	Team Katusha	+ 9"
6	Marcel Kittel (GER)	Project 1t4i	+ 10"
7	Peter Sagan (SVK)	Liquigas–Cannondale	+ 10"
8	Nacer Bouhanni (FRA)	FDJ–BigMat	+ 10"
9	Daniel Oss (ITA)	Liquigas–Cannondale	+ 10"
10	Andrea Guardini (ITA)	Farnese Vini–Selle Italia	+ 10"

=== Stage 2 ===
15 February 2012 – Sur to Wadi Dhaiqah, 140.5 km (87.3 mi)

Stage 2 Result

	Rider	Team	Time
1	Peter Sagan (SVK)	Liquigas–Cannondale	3h 10' 44"
2	Baden Cooke (AUS)	GreenEDGE	s.t.
3	Tom-Jelte Slagter (NED)	Rabobank	s.t.
4	Tony Gallopin (FRA)	RadioShack–Nissan	s.t.
5	Ramūnas Navardauskas (LTU)	Garmin–Barracuda	s.t.
6	Nacer Bouhanni (FRA)	FDJ–BigMat	s.t.
7	Christopher Sutton (AUS)	Team Sky	s.t.
8	Jakob Fuglsang (DEN)	RadioShack–Nissan	s.t.
9	Fabian Cancellara (SUI)	RadioShack–Nissan	+ 4"
10	André Greipel (GER)	Lotto–Belisol	+ 4"

General Classification after Stage 2

	Cyclist	Team	Time
1	Peter Sagan (SVK)	Liquigas–Cannondale	6h 36' 43"
2	André Greipel (GER)	Lotto–Belisol	+ 4"
3	Baden Cooke (AUS)	GreenEDGE	+ 7"
4	Tom-Jelte Slagter (NED)	Rabobank	+ 9"
5	Nacer Bouhanni (FRA)	FDJ–BigMat	+ 10"
6	Tony Gallopin (FRA)	RadioShack–Nissan	+ 10"
7	Christopher Sutton (AUS)	Team Sky	+ 10"
8	Jakob Fuglsang (DEN)	RadioShack–Nissan	+ 13"
9	Ramūnas Navardauskas (LTU)	Garmin–Barracuda	+ 13"
10	Fabian Cancellara (SUI)	RadioShack–Nissan	+ 17"

=== Stage 3 ===
16 February 2012 – Al Awabi to BankMuscat, 144.5 km (89.8 mi)

Stage 3 Result

	Rider	Team	Time
1	Marcel Kittel (GER)	Project 1t4i	3h 23' 00"
2	André Greipel (GER)	Lotto–Belisol	s.t.
3	Nacer Bouhanni (FRA)	FDJ–BigMat	s.t.
4	Tyler Farrar (USA)	Garmin–Barracuda	s.t.
5	Peter Sagan (SVK)	Liquigas–Cannondale	s.t.
6	Tom Boonen (BEL)	Omega Pharma–Quick-Step	s.t.
7	Andrea Guardini (ITA)	Farnese Vini–Selle Italia	s.t.
8	Mark Cavendish (GBR)	Team Sky	s.t.
9	Graeme Brown (AUS)	Rabobank	s.t.
10	Ramūnas Navardauskas (LTU)	Garmin–Barracuda	s.t.

General Classification after Stage 3

	Cyclist	Team	Time
1	André Greipel (GER)	Lotto–Belisol	9h 59' 41"
2	Peter Sagan (SVK)	Liquigas–Cannondale	+ 2"
3	Nacer Bouhanni (FRA)	FDJ–BigMat	+ 8"
4	Baden Cooke (AUS)	GreenEDGE	+ 9"
5	Tom-Jelte Slagter (NED)	Rabobank	+ 11"
6	Tony Gallopin (FRA)	RadioShack–Nissan	+ 12"
7	Christopher Sutton (AUS)	Team Sky	+ 12"
8	Jakob Fuglsang (DEN)	RadioShack–Nissan	+ 15"
9	Ramūnas Navardauskas (LTU)	Garmin–Barracuda	+ 15"
10	Fabian Cancellara (SUI)	RadioShack–Nissan	+ 19"

=== Stage 4 ===
17 February 2012 – Bidbid to Al Wadi al Kabir, 142.5 km (88.5 mi)

Stage 4 Result

	Rider	Team	Time
1	André Greipel (GER)	Lotto–Belisol	3h 37' 02"
2	Peter Sagan (SVK)	Liquigas–Cannondale	s.t.
3	Tony Gallopin (FRA)	RadioShack–Nissan	s.t.
4	Nacer Bouhanni (FRA)	FDJ–BigMat	s.t.
5	Christopher Sutton (AUS)	Team Sky	s.t.
6	Martin Kohler (SUI)	BMC Racing Team	s.t.
7	Pierpaolo De Negri (ITA)	Farnese Vini–Selle Italia	s.t.
8	Sylvain Chavanel (FRA)	Omega Pharma–Quick-Step	s.t.
9	Ramūnas Navardauskas (LTU)	Garmin–Barracuda	s.t.
10	Baden Cooke (AUS)	GreenEDGE	s.t.

General Classification after Stage 4

	Cyclist	Team	Time
1	André Greipel (GER)	Lotto–Belisol	13h 36' 33"
2	Peter Sagan (SVK)	Liquigas–Cannondale	+ 6"
3	Nacer Bouhanni (FRA)	FDJ–BigMat	+ 18"
4	Tony Gallopin (FRA)	RadioShack–Nissan	+ 18"
5	Baden Cooke (AUS)	GreenEDGE	+ 19"
6	Tom-Jelte Slagter (NED)	Rabobank	+ 21"
7	Christopher Sutton (AUS)	Team Sky	+ 22"
8	Jakob Fuglsang (DEN)	RadioShack–Nissan	+ 25"
9	Ramūnas Navardauskas (LTU)	Garmin–Barracuda	+ 25"
10	Fabian Cancellara (SUI)	RadioShack–Nissan	+ 29"

=== Stage 5 ===
18 February 2012 – Royal Opera House Muscat to Jabal al Akhdar, 158 km (98.2 mi)

Stage 5 Result

	Rider	Team	Time
1	Vincenzo Nibali (ITA)	Liquigas–Cannondale	4h 43' 47"
2	Peter Velits (SVK)	Omega Pharma–Quick-Step	+ 10"
3	Sandy Casar (FRA)	FDJ–BigMat	+ 25"
4	Arnold Jeannesson (FRA)	FDJ–BigMat	+ 30"
5	Tony Gallopin (FRA)	RadioShack–Nissan	+ 37"
6	Tom-Jelte Slagter (NED)	Rabobank	+ 47"
7	Joaquim Rodríguez (ESP)	Team Katusha	+ 55"
8	Thomas Lebas (FRA)	Bridgestone–Anchor	+ 57"
9	Fabian Cancellara (SUI)	RadioShack–Nissan	+ 1' 01"
10	Ramūnas Navardauskas (LTU)	Garmin–Barracuda	+ 1' 02"

General Classification after Stage 5

	Cyclist	Team	Time
1	Peter Velits (SVK)	Omega Pharma–Quick-Step	18h 20' 58"
2	Vincenzo Nibali (ITA)	Liquigas–Cannondale	+ 1"
3	Tony Gallopin (FRA)	RadioShack–Nissan	+ 17"
4	Sandy Casar (FRA)	FDJ–BigMat	+ 21"
5	Arnold Jeannesson (FRA)	FDJ–BigMat	+ 30"
6	Tom-Jelte Slagter (NED)	Rabobank	+ 30"
7	Joaquim Rodríguez (ESP)	Team Katusha	+ 47"
8	Ramūnas Navardauskas (LTU)	Garmin–Barracuda	+ 49"
9	Thomas Lebas (FRA)	Bridgestone–Anchor	+ 50"
10	Fabian Cancellara (SUI)	RadioShack–Nissan	+ 52"

=== Stage 6 ===
19 February 2012 – Al Khawd to Matrah Corniche, 130.5 km (81.1 mi)

Stage 6 Result

	Rider	Team	Time
1	Marcel Kittel (GER)	Project 1t4i	3h 11' 04"
2	Peter Sagan (SVK)	Liquigas–Cannondale	s.t.
3	Tyler Farrar (USA)	Garmin–Barracuda	s.t.
4	Denis Galimzyanov (RUS)	Team Katusha	s.t.
5	Nacer Bouhanni (FRA)	FDJ–BigMat	s.t.
6	Daniel Oss (ITA)	Liquigas–Cannondale	s.t.
7	Alexander Kristoff (NOR)	Team Katusha	s.t.
8	Tom Boonen (BEL)	Omega Pharma–Quick-Step	s.t.
9	Andrea Guardini (ITA)	Farnese Vini–Selle Italia	s.t.
10	Vladimir Gusev (RUS)	Team Katusha	s.t.

Final General Classification

	Cyclist	Team	Time
1	Peter Velits (SVK)	Omega Pharma–Quick-Step	21h 32' 02"
2	Vincenzo Nibali (ITA)	Liquigas–Cannondale	+ 1"
3	Tony Gallopin (FRA)	RadioShack–Nissan	+ 17"
4	Sandy Casar (FRA)	FDJ–BigMat	+ 21"
5	Arnold Jeannesson (FRA)	FDJ–BigMat	+ 30"
6	Tom-Jelte Slagter (NED)	Rabobank	+ 30"
7	Joaquim Rodríguez (ESP)	Team Katusha	+ 47"
8	Ramūnas Navardauskas (LTU)	Garmin–Barracuda	+ 49"
9	Thomas Lebas (FRA)	Bridgestone–Anchor	+ 50"
10	Fabian Cancellara (SUI)	RadioShack–Nissan	+ 52"

== Classification leadership ==
Stage	Winner	General Classification	Points Classification	Young Rider Classification	Combative Cyclist Classification	Teams Classification
1	André Greipel	André Greipel	André Greipel	Denis Galimzyanov	Alexandre Lemair	Liquigas–Cannondale
2	Peter Sagan	Peter Sagan	Peter Sagan	Peter Sagan	Klaas Lodewyck	RadioShack–Nissan
3	Marcel Kittel	André Greipel	André Greipel	Peter Sagan	Alexandre Lemair	RadioShack–Nissan
4	André Greipel	André Greipel	André Greipel	Peter Sagan	Klaas Lodewyck	RadioShack–Nissan
5	Vincenzo Nibali	Peter Velits	André Greipel	Tony Gallopin	Klaas Lodewyck	RadioShack–Nissan
6	Marcel Kittel	Peter Velits	Peter Sagan	Tony Gallopin	Klaas Lodewyck	RadioShack–Nissan
Final		Peter Velits	Peter Sagan	Tony Gallopin	Klaas Lodewyck	RadioShack–Nissan
