= Klaas Lodewyck =

Belgian cyclist

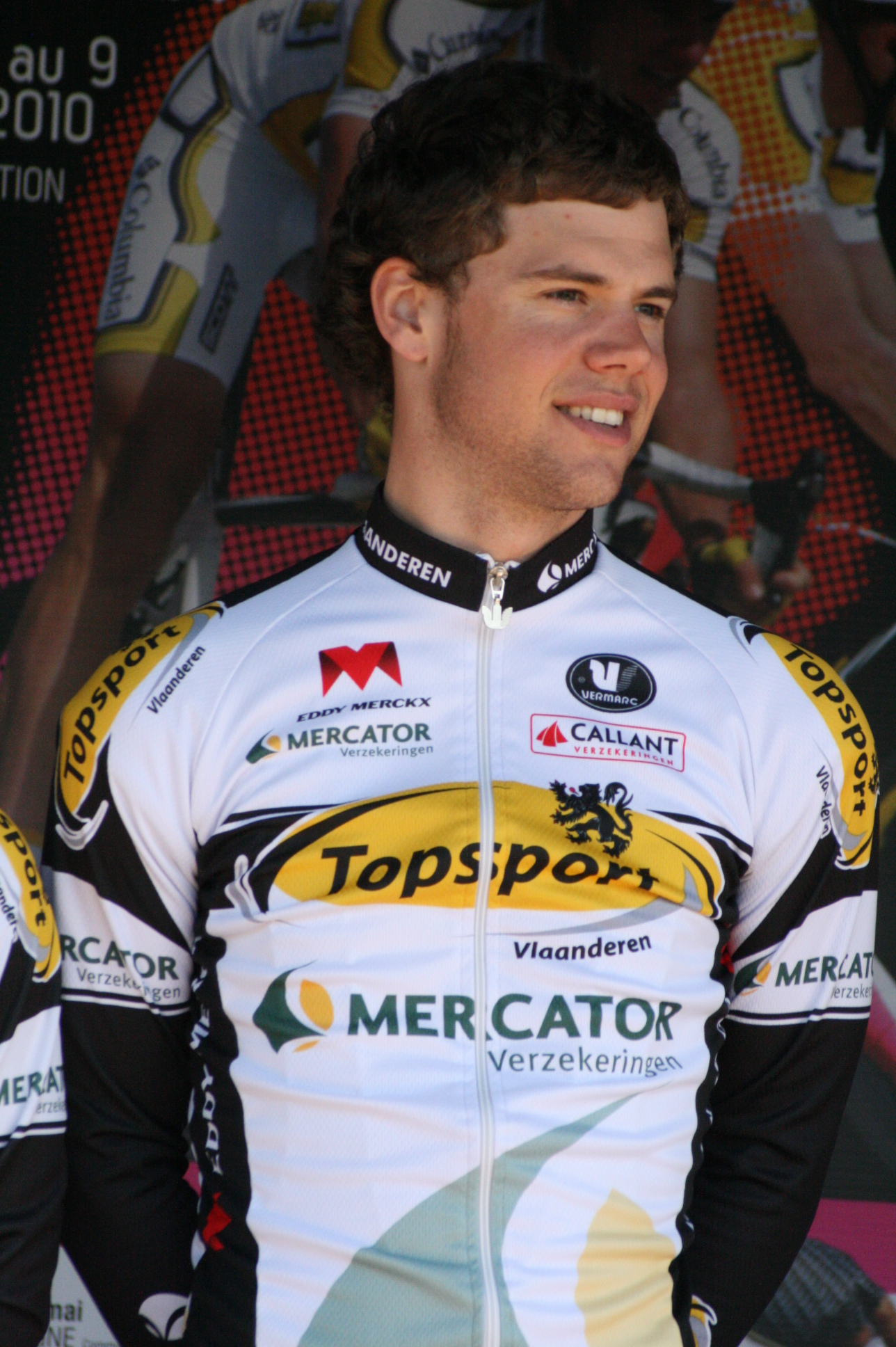
- Lodewyck at the 2010 Four Days of Dunkirk

Personal information
- Full name: Klaas Lodewyck
- Born: 24 March 1988 (age 38) Roeselare, Belgium
- Height: 1.81 m (5 ft 11 1/2 in)
- Weight: 70 kg (154 lb)

Cycling career
- Sport: Cycling
- Current team: Soudal–Quick-Step
- Discipline: Road
- Role: Rider (retired); Directeur sportif

Amateur team
- 2008: Rabobank Continental Team

Professional teams
- 2009–2010: Topsport Vlaanderen–Mercator
- 2011: Omega Pharma–Lotto
- 2012–2015: BMC Racing Team

Managerial teams
- 2016–2018: BMC Racing Team
- 2019–: Deceuninck–Quick-Step

Klaas Lodewyck (born 24 March 1988) is a Belgian former professional road cyclist, who rode professionally between 2009 and 2015 for the Topsport Vlaanderen–Mercator, Omega Pharma–Lotto and BMC Racing Team squads. He now works as a directeur sportif for UCI WorldTeam Soudal–Quick-Step.

== Major results ==
2005
2nd Paris–Roubaix Juniors
2006
9th Paris–Roubaix Juniors
2007
1st Stage 2 Ronde de l'Oise
2nd Road race, National Under-23 Road Championships
10th Grand Prix de Waregem
2008
3rd Omloop van het Waasland
2009
9th Châteauroux Classic
9th Grand Prix de Fourmies
10th Omloop van het Waasland
2010
3rd Cholet-Pays de Loire
4th Omloop van het Waasland
4th Paris–Tours
5th Nokere Koerse
5th Profronde van Fryslan
8th Antwerpse Havenpijl
2011
4th Trofeo Cala Millor
5th Trofeo Mallorca
8th Trofeo Magaluf
10th Overall Driedaagse van West-Vlaanderen
2012
1st Combativity classification Tour of Oman
9th Halle–Ingooigem
2014
5th Handzame Classic
7th Nokere Koerse
2015
6th Handzame Classic

=== Grand Tour general classification results timeline ===
Grand Tour	2011	2012	2013
Giro d'Italia	146	—	DNF
Tour de France	—	—	—
Vuelta a España	—	116	120

Legend
—	Did not compete
DNF	Did not finish
