= 2011–12 UCI America Tour =

- Eighth edition of the UCI America Tour

Details
- Dates: 2 October 2011–15 September 2012
- Location: North America and South America
- Races: 29

Champions
- Individual champion: Rory Sutherland (AUS) (UnitedHealthcare)
- Teams' champion: Real Cycling Team
- Nations' champion: Colombia

The 2011–12 UCI America Tour was the eighth season for the UCI America Tour. The season began on 2 October 2011 with the Tobago Cycling Classic and ended on 15 September 2012 with the Univest Grand Prix.

The points leader, based on the cumulative results of previous races, wears the UCI America Tour cycling jersey. Miguel Ubeto from Venezuela was the defending champion of the 2010–11 UCI America Tour. Rory Sutherland from Australia was crowned as the 2011–12 UCI America Tour champion.

Throughout the season, points are awarded to the top finishers of stages within stage races and the final general classification standings of each of the stages races and one-day events. The quality and complexity of a race also determines how many points are awarded to the top finishers, the higher the UCI rating of a race, the more points are awarded.

The UCI ratings from highest to lowest are as follows:

- Multi-day events: 2.HC, 2.1 and 2.2
- One-day events: 1.HC, 1.1 and 1.2

== Events ==
=== 2011 ===
Date	Race name	Location	UCI Rating	Winner	Team
2 October	Tobago Cycling Classic	Trinidad and Tobago	1.2	Riccardo Zoidl (AUT)	RC Arbö-Gourmetfein Wels
16–23 October	Volta de São Paulo	Brazil	2.2	José Eriberto Rodrigues (BRA)	Padaria Real-Caloi
6–13 November	Vuelta a Bolivia	Bolivia	2.2	Juan Cotumba (BOL)	Pio Rico
22–27 November	Vuelta a Chiapas	Mexico	2.2	Iván Casas (COL)	Boyacá Orgullo de America
16–28 December	Vuelta a Costa Rica	Costa Rica	2.2	José Adrián Bonilla (CRC)	Citi Economy Blue

=== 2012 ===
Date	Race name	Location	UCI Rating	Winner	Team
5–15 January	Vuelta de Chile	Chile	2.2	Patricio Almonacid (CHI)	Clos de Pirque-Trek
8 January	Copa América de Ciclismo	Brazil	1.2	Francisco Chamorro (ARG)	Real Cycling Team
13–22 January	Vuelta al Táchira	Venezuela	2.2	Jimmi Briceño (VEN)	Lotería del Táchira
23–29 January	Tour de San Luis	Argentina	2.1	Levi Leipheimer (USA)	Omega Pharma–Quick-Step
20–27 February	Vuelta a la Independencia Nacional	Dominican Republic	2.2	Nelson Sánchez (DOM)	La Vega-Com.Nal.Ener
21–26 February	Rutas de América	Uruguay	2.2	Jorge Soto (URU)	Club Porongos
9 March	Pan American Cycling Championships – Time Trial	Argentina	CC	Matías Médici (ARG)	Argentina (national team)
11 March	Pan American Cycling Championships – Road Race	Argentina	CC	Maximiliano Richeze (ARG)	Argentina (national team)
18–25 March	Vuelta Mexico	Mexico	2.2	Óscar Sevilla (ESP)	Empacadora San Marcos
30 March–8 April	Vuelta al Uruguay	Uruguay	2.2	Magno Nazaret (BRA)	Funvic–Pindamonhangaba
15 April	Tour of the Battenkill	United States	1.2	Francisco Mancebo (ESP)	CompetitiveCyclist.com
2–6 May	Tour of the Gila	United States	2.2	Rory Sutherland (AUS)	UnitedHealthcare
13–20 May	Tour of California	United States	2.HC	Robert Gesink (NED)	Rabobank
13–20 May	Vuelta a Guatemala	Guatemala	2.2	Ramiro Rincón (COL)	EPM–UNE
31 May–3 June	Coupe des Nations Ville Saguenay	Canada	2.Ncup	Arman Kamyshev (KAZ)	Kazakhstan (national team)
3 June	TD Bank International Championship	United States	1.HC	Alexander Serebryakov (RUS)	Team Type 1–Sanofi
12–17 June	Tour de Beauce	Canada	2.2	Rory Sutherland (AUS)	UnitedHealthcare
12–24 June	Vuelta a Colombia	Colombia	2.2	Félix Cárdenas (COL)	GW–Shimano
6–15 July	Vuelta a Venezuela	Venezuela	2.2	Miguel Ubeto (VEN)	Androni Giocattoli–Venezuela
3–5 August	Tour of Elk Grove	United States	2.1	François Parisien (CAN)	SpiderTech–C10
7–12 August	Tour of Utah	United States	2.1	Johann Tschopp (SUI)	BMC Racing Team
20–26 August	USA Pro Cycling Challenge	United States	2.HC	Christian Vande Velde (USA)	Garmin–Sharp
29 August–2 September	Tour do Rio	Brazil	2.2	Kleber Silva (BRA)	Real Cycling Team
15 September	Univest Grand Prix	United States	1.2	Patrick Bevin (NZL)	Bissell

== Final standings ==
=== Individual classification ===
Rank	Name	Team	Points
1	Rory Sutherland (AUS)	UnitedHealthcare	184.8
2	Maximiliano Richeze (ARG)	Team Nippo	166
3	Miguel Ubeto (VEN)	Androni Giocattoli–Venezuela	150
4	Félix Cárdenas (COL)		148
5	Edgardo Simón (ARG)	Real Cycling Team	121
6	Alexander Serebryakov (RUS)	Team Type 1–Sanofi	119
7	François Parisien (CAN)	SpiderTech–C10	99
8	Magno Nazaret (BRA)	Funvic–Pindamonhangaba	96
9	Otávio Bulgarelli (BRA)	Funvic–Pindamonhangaba	96
10	Bruno Langlois (CAN)		96

=== Team classification ===
Rank	Team	Points
1	Real Cycling Team	404
2	Funvic–Pindamonhangaba	404
3	UnitedHealthcare	352.2
4	Optum–Kelly Benefit Strategies	302
5	Team Nippo	299
6	Team Type 1–Sanofi	281
7	Androni Giocattoli–Venezuela	281
8	EPM–UNE	245
9	SpiderTech–C10	242
10	Gobernación de Antioquia-Indeportes Antioquia	193

=== Nation classification ===
Rank	Nation	Points
1	Colombia	1571.2
2	United States	1103.8
3	Argentina	964
4	Canada	928
5	Brazil	816
6	Venezuela	789.8
7	Costa Rica	310
8	Chile	279
9	Uruguay	254
10	Netherlands Antilles	220

=== Nation under-23 classification ===
Rank	Nation under-23	Points
1	Colombia	422
2	United States	389.4
3	Venezuela	142
4	Costa Rica	130
5	Canada	103
6	Dominican Republic	84
7	Argentina	77
8	Netherlands Antilles	72
9	Chile	69
10	Suriname	67
