= Wadi Dayqah =

Watercourse in Oman

Coordinates: 23°04′57″N 58°50′56″E

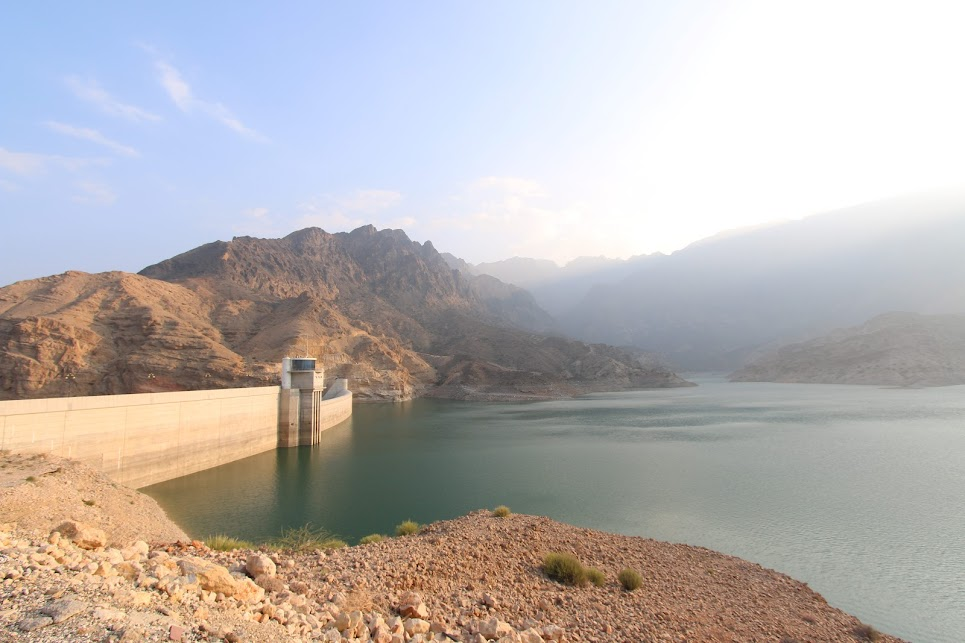
Dayqah Dam

Wadi Dhaiqah is a wadi, or dry river bed, in a canyon approximately 90 km (56 mi) east of the Bait Hattat (Wadi Adei) roundabout in Muscat, Oman.

As many as 120 other wadis lead to this valley, which contains a natural park extending from Wilayat Dima W'attayyeen in the Sharqiyah region to the Wilayat of Qurayyat in the Governorate of Muscat. Wadi Dhaiqah contains the fruit farms of Al Mazarea, and has been the focus of Omani government plans for a major irrigation project. The water is stored with a dam called Wadi Dhaiqah dam which is located along the Qurayyat - Sur highways road.

== Wadi Dayqah Dam ==
The dam was opened in 2012 by Sayeed Fatik Bin Fahar Al Saeed, Secretary-General at the Ministry of Heritage and Culture. While preserving the ancient falaj irrigation system, the dam effectively regulates the water surges cascading down the hillside. The lake, stretching eight kilometers, has the capacity to store 100 million cubic meters of rainwater. The lake’s circumference is about 28km. Comprising two components, the main dam reaches a height of 75 meters (246 feet), accompanied by a secondary dam standing at 48.5 meters (149 feet). The main dam features a water drainage tower.
