= Mauro Da Dalto =

Italian cyclist

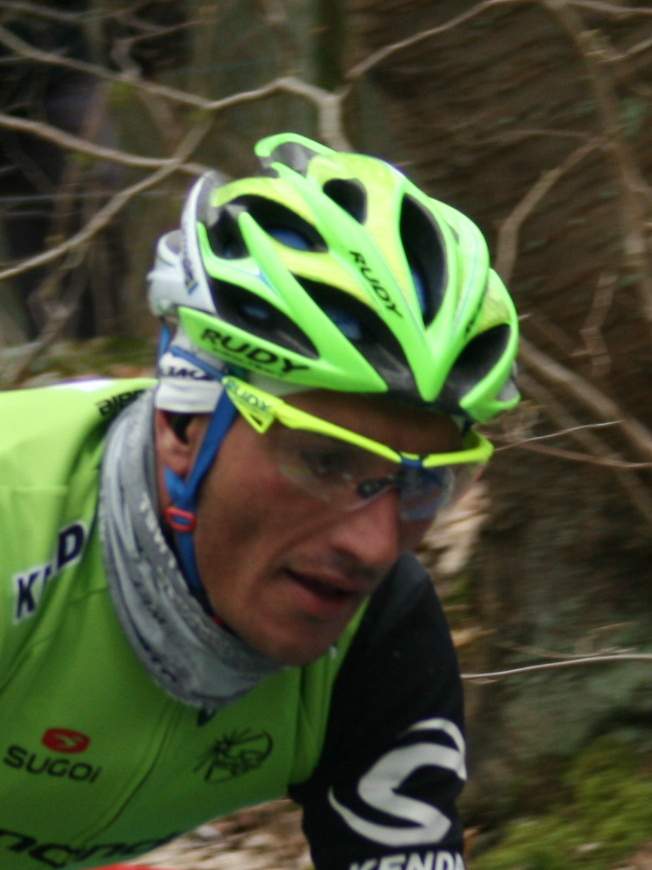
- Da Dalto at the 2013 Gent–Wevelgem

Personal information
- Full name: Mauro Da Dalto
- Born: 8 April 1981 (age 45) Conegliano, Italy
- Height: 1.81 m (5 ft 11 in)
- Weight: 72 kg (159 lb)

Cycling career
- Sport: Cycling
- Discipline: Road
- Role: Rider

Professional teams
- 2005–2008: Liquigas–Bianchi
- 2009–2010: Lampre–NGC
- 2011–2013: Liquigas–Cannondale

Mauro Da Dalto (born 8 April 1981) is an Italian professional road bicycle racer, who last rode for UCI ProTeam Cannondale. Born in Conegliano, Da Dalto started in the Marchiol-Ima-Famila team, the semi-professional branch of the Liquigas-team for neo-professionals. At the end of 2005, Da Dalto signed a contract at Liquigas–Bianchi. He has also ridden for Lampre–NGC.

== Career achievements ==
=== Major results ===
Da Dalto has won one stage in his career, before he started as a full professional.

2004
1st Stage 4 Giro delle Valli Cuneesi nelle Alpi del Mare
2005
1st Coppa Caduti di Reda

=== Grand Tour general classification results timeline ===
Grand Tour	2007	2008	2009	2010	2011	2012	2013
Giro d'Italia	—	—	120	—	—	—	—
Tour de France	—	—	—	123	—	—	—
Vuelta a España	101	—	—	—	147	130	—

Legend
—	Did not compete
DNF	Did not finish
