= Paolo Longo Borghini =

Italian cyclist

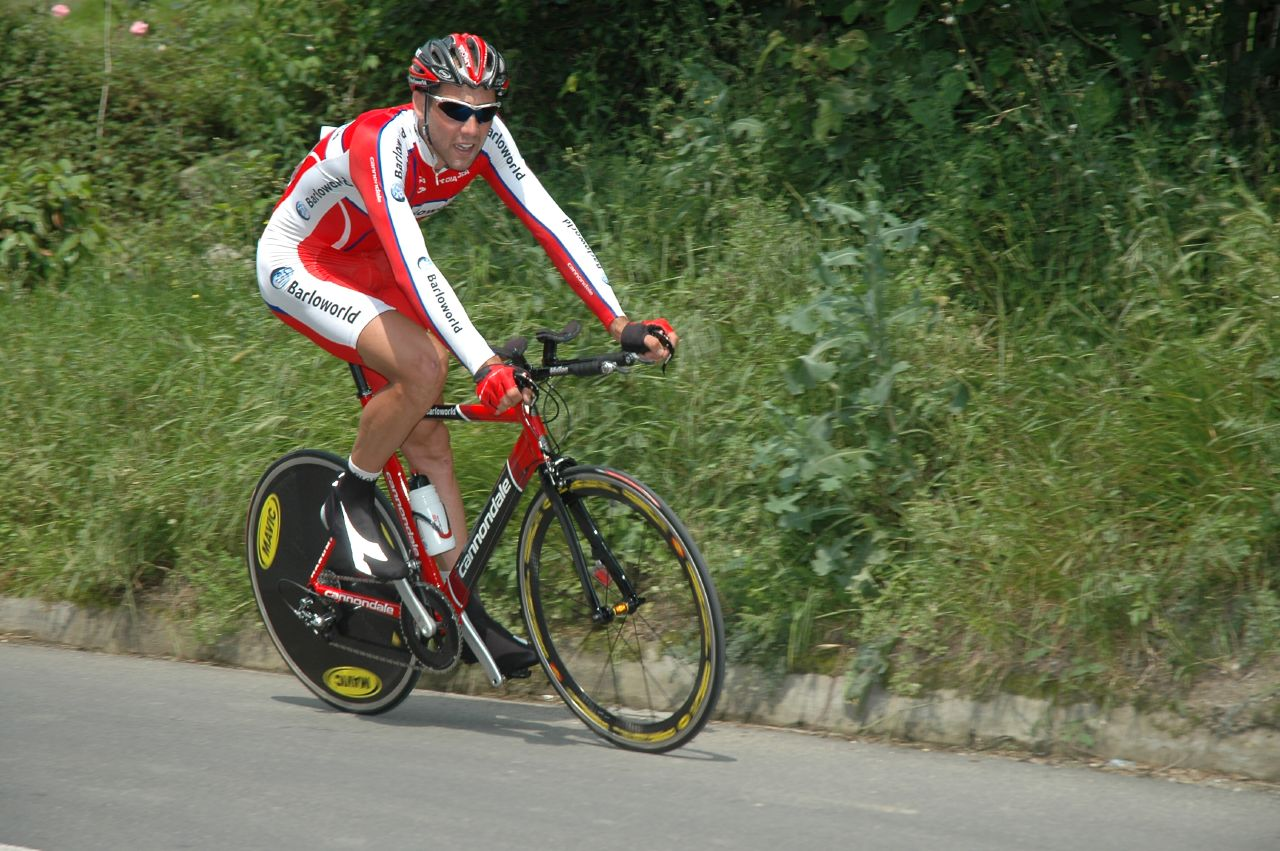
- Longo Borghini at the 2007 Euskal Bizikleta

Personal information
- Full name: Paolo Longo Borghini
- Nickname: Caterpillar
- Born: 10 December 1980 (age 45) Asiago, Italy
- Height: 1.87 m (6 ft 1 1/2 in)
- Weight: 76 kg (168 lb)

Cycling career
- Sport: Cycling
- Discipline: Road
- Role: Rider

Professional teams
- 2004: Vini Caldirola–Nobili Rubinetterie
- 2005: Barloworld
- 2006: Ceramica Flaminia–Bossini Docce
- 2007–2009: Barloworld
- 2010: ISD–NERI
- 2011–2014: Liquigas–Cannondale

Major wins
- Gran Premio Nobili Rubinetterie (2006)

Paolo Longo Borghini (born 10 December 1980 in Asiago) is an Italian former professional road bicycle racer.

Longo Borghini is the son of three-time cross-country skiing Olympian Guidina Dal Sasso. His younger sister Elisa Longo Borghini is also a racing cyclist.

== Major results ==
2001
3rd Trophée des Alpes de la Mer
2002
3rd Trofeo Alcide Degasperi
2003
7th Trofeo Gianfranco Bianchin
2006
1st Gran Premio Nobili Rubinetterie
7th Giro del Veneto
2007
8th Overall Tour Down Under
9th GP Industria & Artigianato di Larciano
2008
5th Grand Prix de Denain

=== Grand Tour general classification results timeline ===
Grand Tour	2007	2008	2009	2010	2011	2012	2013	2014
Giro d'Italia	—	—	111	—	—	108	67	99
Tour de France	123	DNF	—	—	125	—	—	—
Vuelta a España	—	—	—	—	—	—	89	101

Legend
—	Did not compete
DNF	Did not finish
