= Stefano Agostini (cyclist) =

Italian cyclist (born 1989)

Personal information
- Full name: Stefano Agostini
- Born: 3 January 1989 (age 37) Udine, Italy
- Height: 1.72 m (5 ft 7 1/2 in)
- Weight: 62 kg (137 lb)

Cycling career
- Sport: Cycling
- Current team: Provisionally suspended
- Discipline: Road
- Role: Rider

Professional teams
- 2011: Zalf Désirée Fior
- 2011: →Liquigas–Cannondale (stagiaire)
- 2012–2013: Liquigas–Cannondale

Stefano Agostini (born 3 January 1989) is a professional road cyclist, who last rode for Cannondale.

== Biography ==
He joined the team in 2011 as a stagiaire before signing on as a neo-pro for the 2012 season.

On 20 September 2013 the UCI announced that Agostini was provisionally suspended for an adverse analytical finding for 0.7 nanogram per millilitre clostebol in an out-of-competition test taken on 21 August 2013. He said his positive test was due to use of a topical cream to treat a rash, in what the Italian called was "an act of carelessness, in good faith, and I’m paying dearly for it". Agostini said he would not seek analysis of his B sample. He confirmed that he had been fired by the Cannondale team. He was given a 15-month suspension for doping, ending 20 November 2014.

== Achievements ==
2006
1st Stage 2 Tre Ciclistica Bresciana
2007
1st Stage 2 Tre Ciclistica Bresciana
2009
5th Trofeo Gianfranco Bianchin
2010
1st San Vendemiano
1st National U23 Road Race Champion
2011
5th Giro del Belvedere
6th Trofeo Alcide De Gasperi
3rd Overall Girobio

1st Mountains classification
1st Stages 4 & 7

8th GP di Poggiana
