= Cristiano Salerno =

Italian cyclist

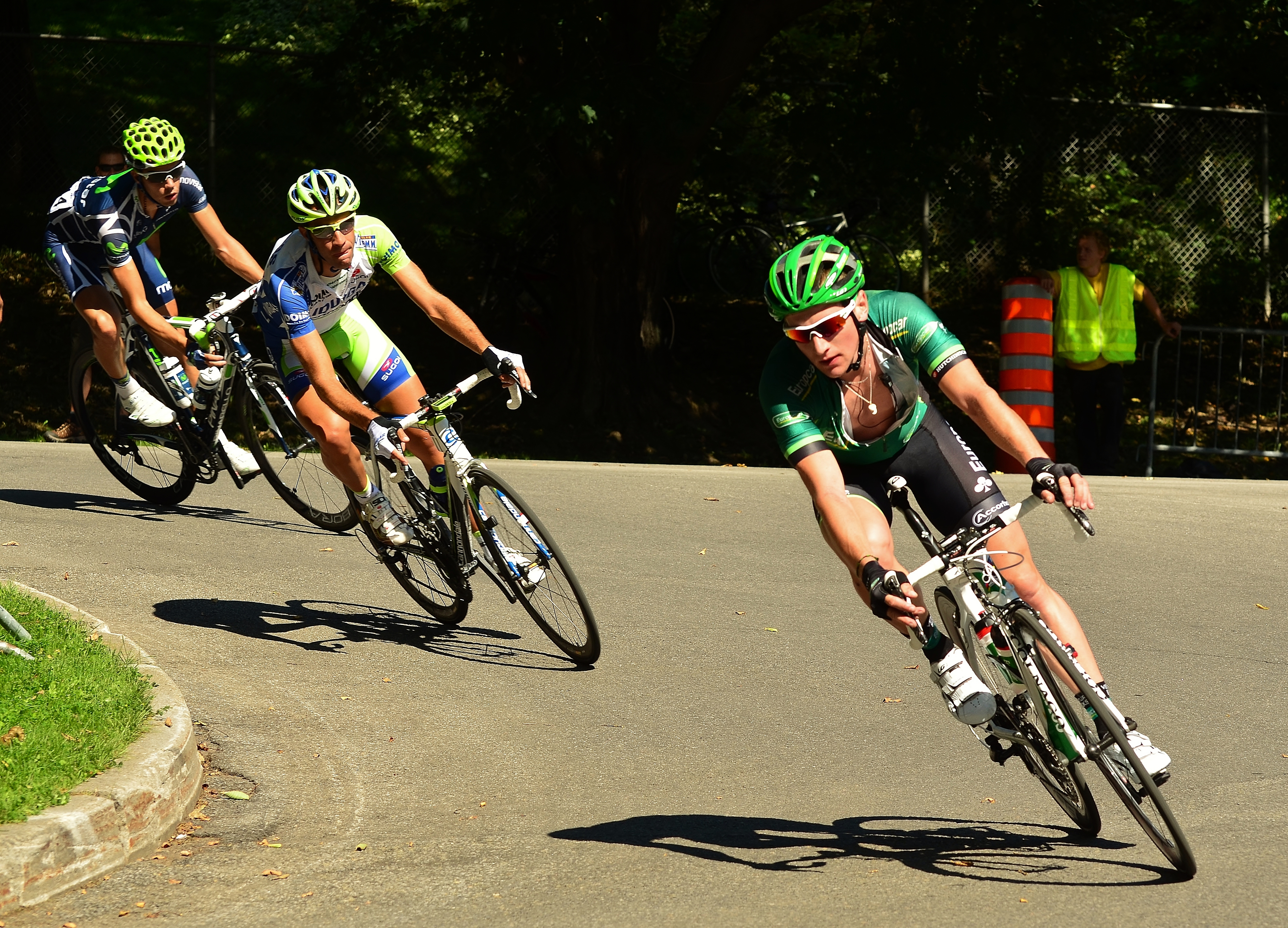
- Salerno (middle) at the 2011 Grand Prix Cycliste de Québec

Personal information
- Full name: Cristiano Salerno
- Born: 18 February 1985 (age 41) Imperia, Italy
- Height: 1.81 m (5 ft 11 in)
- Weight: 63 kg (139 lb)

Cycling career
- Sport: Cycling
- Current team: Retired
- Discipline: Road
- Role: Rider
- Rider type: Climber

Professional teams
- 2006–2007: Tenax–Salmilano
- 2008–2009: LPR Brakes–Ballan
- 2010: De Rosa–Stac Plastic
- 2011–2014: Liquigas–Cannondale
- 2015: Bora–Argon 18

Cristiano Salerno (born 18 February 1985) is an Italian former professional road cyclist, who rode professionally between 2006 and 2015.

== Major results ==
2004
6th Overall Giro della Valle d'Aosta
2005
3rd Overall Giro della Valle d'Aosta
5th Piccolo Giro di Lombardia
6th Gran Premio San Giuseppe
9th Gran Premio Palio del Recioto
2006
7th Overall Regio-Tour
2009
7th Tre Valli Varesine
10th Trofeo Melinda
2010
1st Overall Tour of Japan

1st Stages 2 & 5

5th Overall Tour of Turkey
7th Overall Giro della Provincia di Reggio Calabria
9th Overall Giro di Sardegna
2011
9th Japan Cup
2013
1st Mountains classification Volta a Catalunya
2015
1st Stage 1 (TTT) Giro del Trentino

=== Grand Tour general classification results timeline ===
Grand Tour	2011	2012	2013
Giro d'Italia	56	105	86
Tour de France	—	—	—
Vuelta a España	—	49	—

Legend
—	Did not compete
DNF	Did not finish
