= Fabio Sabatini =

Road bicycle racer

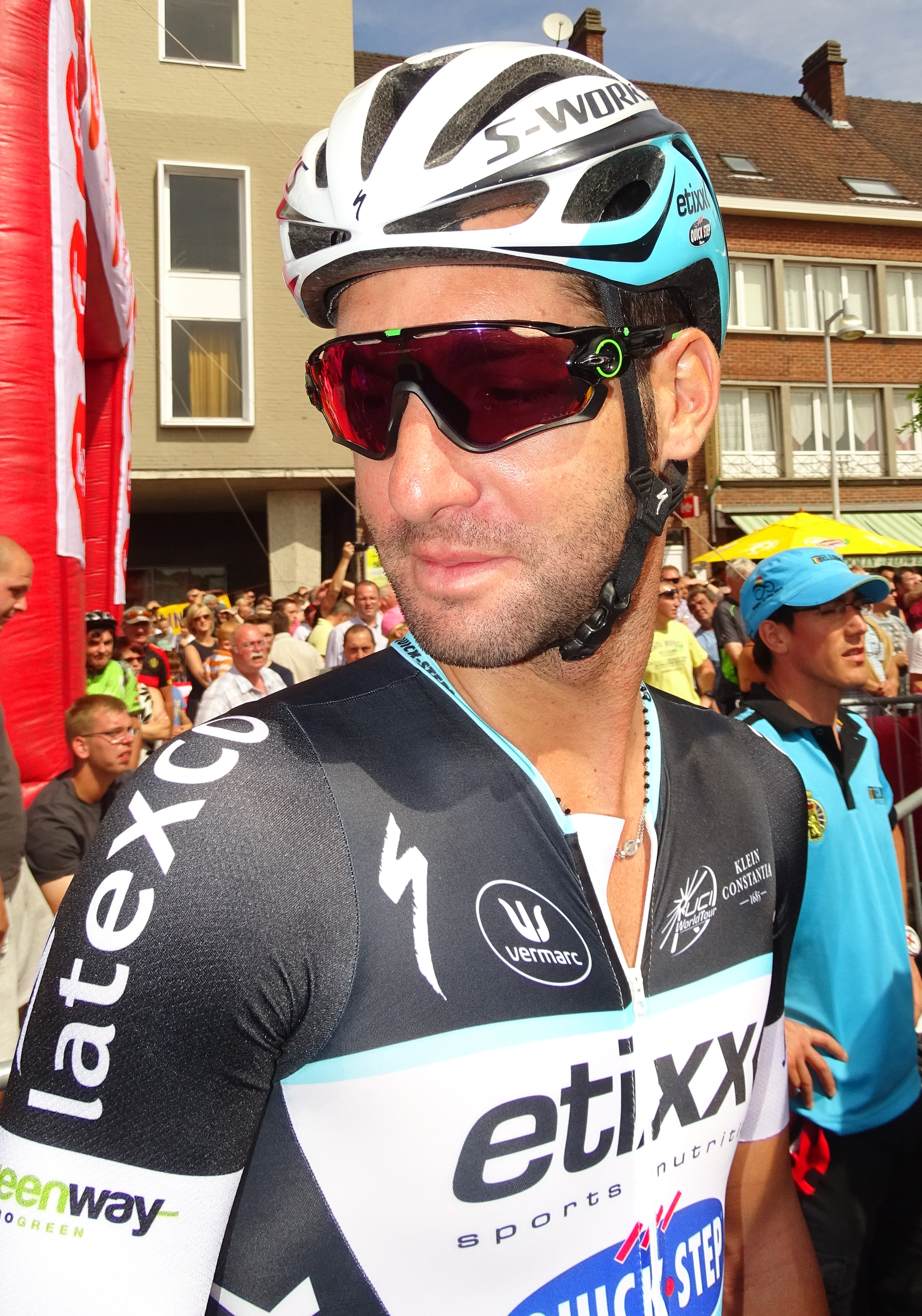
- Sabatini at the 2015 Grand Prix Pino Cerami

Personal information
- Full name: Fabio Sabatini
- Born: 18 February 1985 (age 41) Pescia, Italy
- Height: 1.87 m (6 ft 2 in)
- Weight: 74 kg (163 lb; 11.7 st)

Cycling career
- Sport: Cycling
- Discipline: Road
- Role: Rider
- Rider type: Sprinter; Lead-out man

Professional teams
- 2006–2008: Team Milram
- 2009–2014: Liquigas
- 2015–2019: Etixx–Quick-Step
- 2020–2021: Cofidis

Fabio Sabatini (born 18 February 1985 in Pescia) is an Italian former professional road bicycle racer, who last rode for UCI WorldTeam Cofidis. He was a lead-out man for Elia Viviani and followed him from Deceuninck–Quick-Step to Cofidis. Sabatini retired from competition at the end of the 2021 season.

== Major results ==
2003
1st Time trial, National Junior Road Championships
2004
5th Coppa Città di Asti Under-23
2005
1st Coppa Città di Asti Under-23
3rd Gran Premio della Liberazione
2006
6th Delta Profronde
8th Ronde van Drenthe
2007
10th Firenze–Pistoia
2008
7th Firenze–Pistoia
2009
8th Vattenfall Cyclassics
2010
2nd Classica Sarda
3rd Gran Premio della Costa Etruschi
2013
4th RideLondon–Surrey Classic
2016
1st Stage 1 (TTT) Tour de San Luis
8th Overall Giro di Toscana

=== Grand Tour general classification results timeline ===
Grand Tour	2007	2008	2009	2010	2011	2012	2013	2014	2015	2016	2017	2018	2019	2020	2021
Giro d'Italia	DNF	DNF	—	101	103	79	93	—	110	DNF	—	129	92	—	133
Tour de France	—	—	146	—	166	—	117	118	—	150	154	—	—	—	—
/ Vuelta a España	131	102	115	—	—	—	—	—	—	—	—	152	—	—	—

Legend
—	Did not compete
DNF	Did not finish
