= Tiziano Dall'Antonia =

Italian cyclist

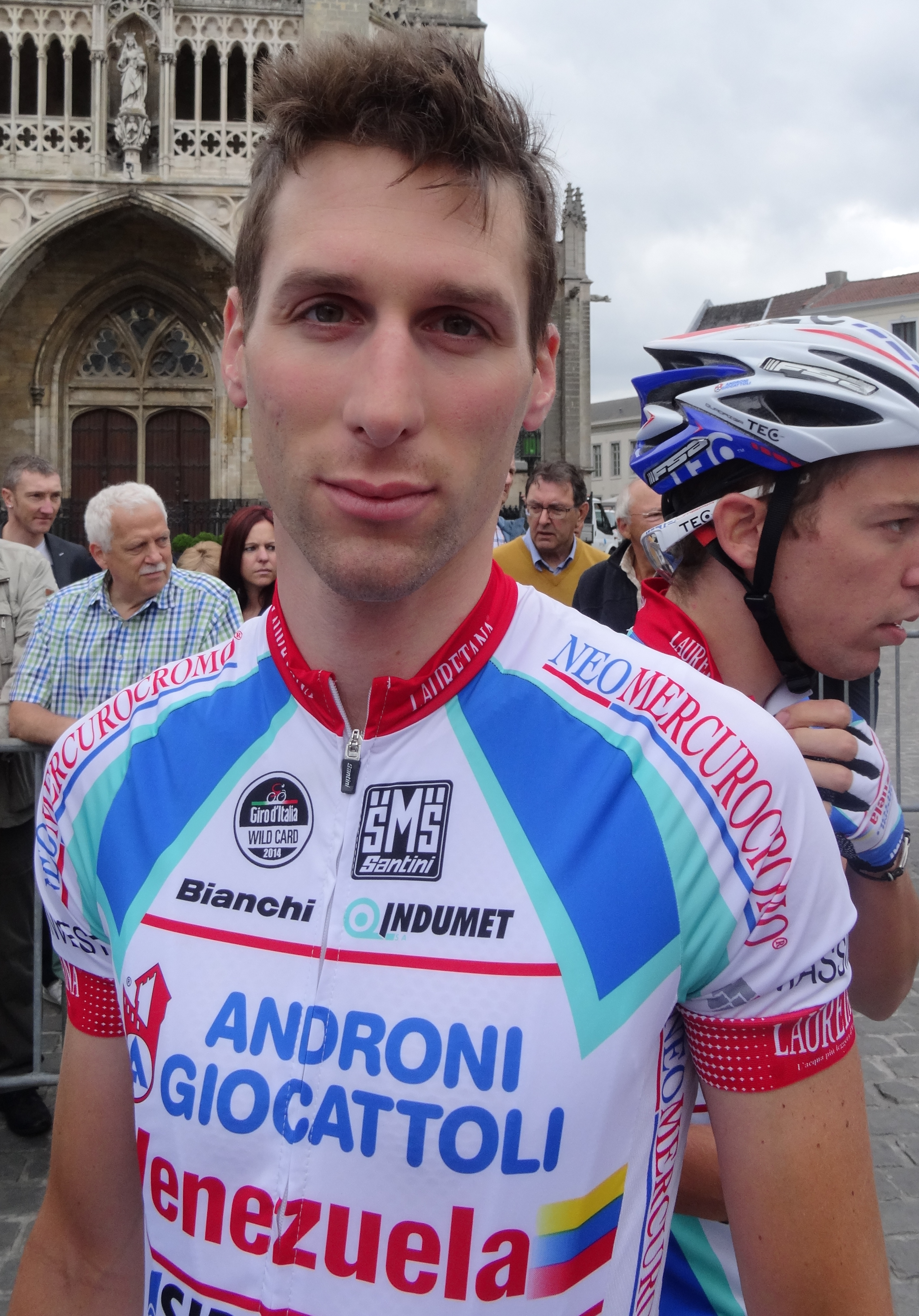
- Dall'Antonia at the 2014 Ronde van Limburg.

Personal information
- Full name: Tiziano Dall'Antonia
- Born: 26 July 1983 (age 43) Vittorio Veneto, Italy
- Height: 1.84 m (6 ft 1/2 in)
- Weight: 70 kg (154 lb)

Cycling career
- Sport: Cycling
- Discipline: Road
- Role: Rider
- Rider type: Time trialist

Professional teams
- 2006–2009: Ceramica Panaria–Navigare
- 2010–2013: Liquigas–Doimo
- 2014–: Androni Giocattoli–Venezuela

Tiziano Dall'Antonia (born 26 July 1983 in Vittorio Veneto) is an Italian professional road bicycle racer, who rides for UCI Professional Continental GW Erco SportFitness.

== Career achievements ==
=== Major results ===
2005
2nd Overall Tour de Berlin
2nd Coppa Citta di Asti
3rd Overall Triptyque des Barrages
4th Individual Road Race Mediterranean Games
6th Trofeo Zsšdi
2006
10th Doha GP
2007
3rd Overall Tour de Luxembourg

1st Young rider classification

7th Grand Prix de Rennes
10th Overall Niedersachsen-Rundfahrt
10th Gran Premio della Costa Etruschi
2008
3rd Overall Circuit de la Sarthe
10th Trofeo Laigueglia
2010
1st Stage 4 (TTT) Giro d'Italia
1st Stage 1b (TTT) Settimana internazionale di Coppi e Bartali
3rd Gran Premio Nobili Rubinetterie
7th Giro del Friuli
2011
9th Tour de Mumbai II

=== Grand Tour general classification results timeline ===
Grand Tour	2008	2009	2010	2011	2012	2013	2014	2015	2016
Giro d'Italia	98	—	91	138	—	113	—	DNF	—
Tour de France	—	—	—	—	—	—	—	—	—
Vuelta a España	—	—	—	—	140	111	—	—	—

Legend
—	Did not compete
DNF	Did not finish
