= Roberto Amadio =

Italian cyclist and sports manager

Personal information
- Full name: Roberto Amadio
- Born: 10 July 1963 (age 63) Portogruaro, Italy

Cycling career
- Sport: Cycling
- Current team: Liquigas
- Role: Rider (retired); Team manager

Professional teams
- 1985: Santini – Krups
- 1986–1987: Supermercati Brianzoli
- 1988–1989: Chateau d'Ax

Managerial teams
- 1992–1994: Jolly Modular
- 1995–1997: Aki
- 1998–1999: Vini Caldirola
- 2000–2001: Liquigas
- 2002: Cage Maglierie
- 2004: Vini Caldirola–Nobili Rubinetterie
- 2005–: Liquigas–Bianchi

Major wins
- 1985: Team pursuit

Roberto Amadio (born 10 July 1963, in Portogruaro, Italy) is an Italian sports manager and former road and track cyclist. Professional from 1985 to 1989, he was the world champion in the team pursuit in 1985. He also competed in the team pursuit event at the 1984 Summer Olympics. Since 2005 he is team manager and director of the team Liquigas.
