= 2022 UCI Europe Tour =

Seventeenth season of the UCI Europe Tour

- Eighteenth edition of the UCI Europe Tour

Details
- Dates: 23 January – 16 October 2022
- Location: Europe

The 2022 UCI Europe Tour was the eighteenth season of the UCI Europe Tour. The 2022 season began on 23 January 2022 with the Clàssica Comunitat Valenciana 1969, and concluded on 16 October 2022 with the Chrono des Nations and the Veneto Classic.

Throughout the season, points are awarded to the top finishers of stages within stage races and the final general classification standings of each of the stages races and one-day events. The quality and complexity of a race also determines how many points are awarded to the top finishers, the higher the UCI rating of a race, the more points are awarded.

The UCI ratings from highest to lowest are as follows:

- Multi-day events: 2.Pro, 2.1 and 2.2
- One-day events: 1.Pro, 1.1, 1.2, and Criterium Pro (CRTP)

On 1 March 2022, the UCI cancelled all events that would have taken place in Russia and Belarus, due to the Russian invasion of Ukraine; the only event impacted by this was the Five Rings of Moscow, originally scheduled for 8–12 June.

== Events ==
=== January ===
Date	Race name	Location	UCI Rating	Winner	Team	Ref.
23 January	Clàssica Comunitat Valenciana 1969	Spain	1.2	Giovanni Lonardi (ITA)	Eolo–Kometa	
26 January	Trofeo Calvià	Spain	1.1	Brandon McNulty (USA)	UAE Team Emirates	
27 January	Trofeo Alcúdia – Port d'Alcúdia	Spain	1.1	Biniam Girmay (ERI)	Intermarché–Wanty–Gobert Matériaux	
28 January	Trofeo Serra de Tramuntana	Spain	1.1	Tim Wellens (BEL)	Lotto–Soudal	
29 January	Trofeo Pollença – Port d'Andratx	Spain	1.1	Alejandro Valverde (ESP)	Movistar Team	
30 January	Grand Prix La Marseillaise	France	1.1	Amaury Capiot (BEL)	Arkéa–Samsic	
30 January	Grand Prix Megasaray	Turkey	1.2	Tord Gudmestad (NOR)	Uno-X Pro Cycling Team	
30 January	Trofeo Playa de Palma	Spain	1.1	Arnaud De Lie (BEL)	Lotto–Soudal	

=== February ===
Date	Race name	Location	UCI Rating	Winner	Team	Ref.
2–6 February	Étoile de Bessèges	France	2.1	Benjamin Thomas (FRA)	Cofidis	
5 February	Grand Prix Alanya	Turkey	1.2	Alessio Martinelli (ITA)	Bardiani–CSF–Faizanè	
10–13 February	Tour of Antalya	Turkey	2.1	Jacob Hindsgaul Madsen (DEN)	Uno-X Pro Cycling Team	
12 February	Vuelta a Murcia	Spain	1.1	Alessandro Covi (ITA)	UAE Team Emirates	
14 February	Clásica Jaén	Spain	1.1	Alexey Lutsenko (KAZ)	Astana Qazaqstan Team	
18–20 February	Tour des Alpes-Maritimes et du Var	France	2.1	Nairo Quintana (COL)	Arkéa–Samsic	
19 February	Grand Prix Velo Alanya	Turkey	1.2	Igor Chzhan (KAZ)	Almaty Cycling Team	
20 February	Grand Prix Justiniano Hotels	Turkey	1.2	Yauheni Karaliok (BLR)	Minsk Cycling Club	
24–27 February	O Gran Camiño	Spain	2.1	Alejandro Valverde (ESP)	Movistar Team	

=== March ===
Date	Race name	Location	UCI Rating	Winner	Team	Ref.
1 March	Le Samyn	Belgium	1.1	Matteo Trentin (ITA)	UAE Team Emirates	
2 March	Umag Trophy	Croatia	1.2	Daniel Auer (AUT)	WSA KTM Graz p/b Leomo	
5 March	Ster van Zwolle	Netherlands	1.2	Cancelled		
5 March	Grand Prix Gazipaşa	Turkey	1.2	Onur Balkan (TUR)	Sakarya BB Pro Team	
6 March	Grand Prix de la Ville de Lillers	France	1.2	Milan Menten (BEL)	Bingoal Pauwels Sauces WB	
6 March	Grand Prix Mediterrennean	Turkey	1.2	Anatoliy Budyak (UKR)	Terengganu Polygon Cycling Team	
6 March	Bloeizone Elfsteden Fryslan	Netherlands	1.2	Elmar Reinders (NED)	Riwal Cycling Team	
6 March	Grote Prijs Jean-Pierre Monseré	Belgium	1.1	Arnaud De Lie (BEL)	Lotto–Soudal	
6 March	Poreč Trophy	Croatia	1.2	Dušan Rajović (SRB)	Team Corratec	
10–13 March	Istrian Spring Trophy	Croatia	2.2	Matthew Riccitello (USA)	Hagens Berman Axeon	
12–13 March	South Aegean Tour	Greece	2.2	Matteo Dal-Cin (CAN)	Toronto Hustle	
13 March	Ronde van Drenthe	Netherlands	1.1	Dries Van Gestel (BEL)	Team TotalEnergies	
13 March	Dorpenomloop Rucphen	Netherlands	1.2	Maikel Zijlaard (NED)	VolkerWessels Cycling Team	
13 March	Clássica da Arrábida	Portugal	1.2	Orluis Aular (VEN)	Caja Rural–Seguros RGA	
16–20 March	Volta ao Alentejo	Portugal	2.2	Orluis Aular (VEN)	Caja Rural–Seguros RGA	
16–20 March	Olympia's Tour	Netherlands	2.2	Maikel Zijlaard (NED)	VolkerWessels Cycling Team	
18 March	Youngster Coast Challenge	Belgium	1.2U	Jensen Plowright (AUS)	Équipe Continentale Groupama–FDJ	
19 March	GP Manavgat	Turkey	1.2	Mamyr Stash (Note: As of 1 March 2022, the UCI announced that cyclists from Russia and Belarus would no longer compete under the name or flag of those respective countries due to the Russian invasion of Ukraine.)	Cycling Sport Club OLYMP	
19 March	Classic Loire Atlantique	France	1.1	Anthony Perez (FRA)	Cofidis	
20 March	Cholet-Pays de la Loire	France	1.1	Marc Sarreau (FRA)	AG2R Citroën Team	
20 March	International Rhodes Grand Prix	Greece	1.2	André Drege (NOR)	Team Coop	
20 March	Per sempre Alfredo	Italy	1.1	Marc Hirschi (SUI)	UAE Team Emirates	
20 March	Popolarissima	Italy	1.2	Nicolás David Gómez (COL)	Team Colpack–Ballan	
20 March	Grand Prix Gündoğmuş	Turkey	1.2	Anatoliy Budyak (UKR)	Terengganu Polygon Cycling Team	
20 March	GP Slovenian Istria	Slovenia	1.2	Daniel Auer (AUT)	WSA KTM Graz p/b Leomo	
20 March	Grand Prix Criquielion	Belgium	1.2	Pier-André Côté (CAN)	Human Powered Health	
21–27 March	Tour de Normandie	France	2.2	Mathis Le Berre (FRA)	Côtes d'Armor-Marie Morin-U	
22–26 March	Settimana Internazionale di Coppi e Bartali	Italy	2.1	Eddie Dunbar (IRL)	INEOS Grenadiers	
24 March	GP Vipava Valley & Crossborder Goriška	Slovenia	1.2	Fran Miholjević (CRO)	Cycling Team Friuli ASD	
24–27 March	International Tour of Rhodes	Greece	2.2	Louis Bendixen (DEN)	Team Coop	
27 March	GP Adria Mobil	Slovenia	1.2	Maciej Paterski (POL)	Voster ATS Team	
27 March	La Roue Tourangelle	France	1.1	Nacer Bouhanni (FRA)	Arkéa–Samsic	
27 March	Trofeo Città di San Vendemiano	Italy	1.2U	Federico Guzzo (ITA)	Zalf Euromobil Fior	
31 March – 3 April	Le Triptyque des Monts et Châteaux	Belgium	2.2U	Enzo Paleni (FRA)	Équipe Continentale Groupama–FDJ	

=== April ===
Date	Race name	Location	UCI Rating	Winner	Team	Ref.
1 April	Route Adélie de Vitré	France	1.1	Axel Zingle (FRA)	Cofidis	
2 April	Volta Limburg Classic	Netherlands	1.1	Arnaud De Lie (BEL)	Lotto–Soudal	
3 April	Trofeo Piva	Italy	1.2U	Martin Marcellusi (ITA)	Bardiani–CSF–Faizanè	
5–8 April	Circuit de la Sarthe	France	2.1	Olav Kooij (NED)	Team Jumbo–Visma	
6–9 April	Circuit des Ardennes	France	2.2	Lucas Eriksson (SWE)	Riwal Cycling Team	
12 April	Paris–Camembert	France	1.1	Anthony Delaplace (FRA)	Arkéa–Samsic	
12–15 April	Giro di Sicilia	Italy	2.1	Damiano Caruso (ITA)	Italy (national team)	
13–17 April	Tour du Loir-et-Cher	France	2.2	Michael Kukrle (CZE)	Elkov–Kasper	
14–17 April	Belgrade–Banja Luka	Bosnia and Herzegovina	2.1	Jakub Kaczmarek (POL)	HRE Mazowsze Serce Polski	
15 April	Classic Grand Besançon Doubs	France	1.1	Jesús Herrada (ESP)	Cofidis	
16 April	Tour du Jura	France	1.1	Ben O'Connor (AUS)	AG2R Citroën Team	
16 April	Arno Wallaard Memorial	Netherlands	1.2	Elmar Reinders (NED)	Riwal Cycling Team	
16 April	Liège–Bastogne–Liège Espoirs	Belgium	1.2U	Romain Grégoire (FRA)	Équipe Continentale Groupama–FDJ	
18 April	Giro del Belvedere	Italy	1.2U	Romain Grégoire (FRA)	Équipe Continentale Groupama–FDJ	
19 April	Gran Premio Palio del Recioto	Italy	1.2U	Romain Grégoire (FRA)	Équipe Continentale Groupama–FDJ	
24 April	Rutland–Melton CiCLE Classic	United Kingdom	1.2	Finn Crockett (GBR)	Ribble Weldtite	
25 April	Gran Premio della Liberazione	Italy	1.2	Henri Uhlig (GER)	Germany (national team)	
25 April – 1 May	Tour de Bretagne	France	2.2	Johan Le Bon (FRA)	Dinan Sport Cycling	
27 April – 1 May	International Tour of Hellas	Greece	2.1	Aaron Gate (NZL)	Bolton Equities Black Spoke Pro Cycling	
29 April	Grand Prix Nasielsk-Serock	Poland	1.2	Marceli Bogusławski (POL)	HRE Mazowsze Serce Polski	
29 April – 1 May	Vuelta Asturias	Spain	2.1	Iván Sosa (COL)	Movistar Team	
29 April – 3 May	Carpathian Couriers Race	Poland	2.2U	Fran Miholjević (CRO)	Cycling Team Friuli ASD	
30 April	PWZ Zuidenveld Tour	Netherlands	1.2	Coen Vermeltfoort (NED)	VolkerWessels Cycling Team	
30 April	Grand Prix Wyszków	Poland	1.2	Itamar Einhorn (ISR)	Israel (national team)	

=== May ===
Date	Race name	Location	UCI Rating	Winner	Team	Ref.
1 May	Circuito del Porto-Trofeo Arvedi	Italy	1.2	Davide Persico (ITA)	Team Colpack–Ballan	
7 May	Sundvolden GP	Norway	1.2	Martin Tjøtta (NOR)	Ringerike SK	
7 May	Ronde van Overijssel	Netherlands	1.2	Coen Vermeltfoort (NED)	VolkerWessels Cycling Team	
8 May	Flèche Ardennaise	Belgium	1.2	Romain Grégoire (FRA)	Équipe Continentale Groupama–FDJ	
8 May	Ringerike GP	Norway	1.2	Sakarias Løland (NOR)	Uno-X Dare Development Team	
8 May	Gran Premio Industrie del Marmo	Italy	1.2U	Alessio Martinelli (ITA)	Bardiani–CSF–Faizanè	
11–15 May	Tour de Hongrie	Hungary	2.1	Eddie Dunbar (IRL)	INEOS Grenadiers	
12–15 May	Tour de Lviv Region	Ukraine	2.2	Cancelled due to the 2022 Russian invasion of Ukraine		
21 May	Grand Prix Herning	Denmark	1.2	Andreas Stokbro (DEN)	Denmark (national team)	
21 May	Veenendaal–Veenendaal Classic	Netherlands	1.1	Dylan Groenewegen (NED)	Team BikeExchange–Jayco	
21 May	Tour du Finistère	France	1.1	Julien Simon (FRA)	Team TotalEnergies	
22 May	Rund um Köln	Germany	1.1	Nils Politt (GER)	Bora–Hansgrohe	
22 May	Fyen Rundt	Denmark	1.2	Mads Pedersen (DEN)	Denmark (national team)	
22 May	Boucles de l'Aulne	France	1.1	Idar Andersen (NOR)	Uno-X Pro Cycling Team	
22 May	GP Gorenjska	Slovenia	1.2	Patryk Stosz (POL)	Voster ATS Team	
22 May	Antwerp Port Epic	Belgium	1.1	Florian Vermeersch (BEL)	Lotto–Soudal	
25–29 May	Flèche du Sud	Luxembourg	2.2	Thibau Nys (BEL)	Baloise–Trek Lions	
25–29 May	Alpes Isère Tour	France	2.2	Yannis Voisard (SUI)	Tudor Pro Cycling Team	
26 May	Circuit de Wallonie	Belgium	1.1	Andrea Pasqualon (ITA)	Intermarché–Wanty–Gobert Matériaux	
26–28 May	Tour of Estonia	Estonia	2.1	Evaldas Šiškevičius (LTU)	Lithuania (national team)	
26–29 May	Tour de la Mirabelle	France	2.2	Robert Scott (GBR)	WiV SunGod	
28 May	Kyiv Cup	Ukraine	1.2	Cancelled due to the 2022 Russian invasion of Ukraine		
28 May	Strade Bianche di Romagna	Italy	1.2U	Darren Rafferty (IRL)	Hagens Berman Axeon	
29 May	Kyiv Green Race	Ukraine	1.2	Cancelled due to the 2022 Russian invasion of Ukraine		
29 May	Coppa della Pace	Italy	1.2U	Federico Guzzo (ITA)	Zalf Euromobil Fior	
29 May	Grote Prijs Marcel Kint	Belgium	1.1	Arnaud de Lie (BEL)	Lotto–Soudal	
30 May	Kyiv Speed – Challenge	Ukraine	1.2	Cancelled due to the 2022 Russian invasion of Ukraine		
31 May	Mercan'Tour Classic	France	1.1	Jakob Fuglsang (DEN)	Israel–Premier Tech	
31 May – 4 June	Tour of Albania	Albania	2.2	Ylber Sefa (ALB)	Albania (national team)	

=== June ===
Date	Race name	Location	UCI Rating	Winner	Team	Ref.
2 June	Trofeo Alcide Degasperi	Italy	1.2	Pierre-Pascal Keup (GER)	Team Lotto–Kern Haus	
2 June	Giro dell'Appennino	Italy	1.1	Louis Meintjes (ZAF)	Intermarché–Wanty–Gobert Matériaux	
2–5 June	Ronde de l'Oise	France	2.2	James Fouché (NZL)	Bolton Equities Black Spoke Pro Cycling	
3–5 June	Tour of Małopolska	Poland	2.2	Jonas Rapp (GER)	Hrinkow Advarics	
4 June	Heistse Pijl	Belgium	1.1	Arnaud de Lie (BEL)	Lotto–Soudal	
4–8 June	Adriatica Ionica Race	Italy	2.1	Filippo Zana (ITA)	Bardiani–CSF–Faizanè	
5 June	Memorial Van Coningsloo	Belgium	1.2	Cameron Scott (AUS)	ARA Pro Racing Sunshine Coast	
5 June	Trofeo Città di Meldola	Italy	1.2	Luca Van Boven (BEL)	Lotto–Soudal U23	
6 June	Ronde van Limburg	Belgium	1.1	Arnaud de Lie (BEL)	Lotto–Soudal	
6 June	Paris–Troyes	France	1.2	Robert Scott (GBR)	WiV SunGod	
8 June	Trofeo Città di Riolo Terme	Italy	1.2	Vincent Van Hemelen (BEL)	Lotto–Soudal U23	
9–12 June	Oberösterreich Rundfahrt	Austria	2.2	Rainer Kepplinger (AUT)	Hrinkow Advarics	
10 June	Grand Prix of Aargau Canton	Switzerland	1.1	Marc Hirschi (SUI)	UAE Team Emirates	
10–12 June	Tour d'Eure-et-Loir	France	2.2	Samuel Leroux (FRA)	Go Sport–Roubaix–Lille Métropole	
11–18 June	Giro d'Italia Giovani Under 23	Italy	2.2U	Leo Hayter (GBR)	Hagens Berman Axeon	
12 June	Elfstedenronde	Belgium	1.1	Fabio Jakobsen (NED)	Quick-Step Alpha Vinyl Team	
14 June	Mont Ventoux Dénivelé Challenge	France	1.1	Ruben Guerreiro (POR)	EF Education–EasyPost	
16–19 June	Route d'Occitanie	France	2.1	Michael Woods (CAN)	Israel–Premier Tech	
17–19 June	Tour du Pays de Montbéliard	France	2.2	Michael Kukrle (CZE)	Elkov–Kasper	
19 June	Midden–Brabant Poort Omloop	Netherlands	1.2	Mārtiņš Pluto (LVA)	Abloc CT	
29 June – 2 July	Course de Solidarność et des Champions Olympiques	Poland	2.2	Timo Kielich (BEL)	Alpecin–Fenix Development Team	
30 June – 3 July	Troféu Joaquim Agostinho	Portugal	2.2	Frederico Figueiredo (POR)	Glassdrive–Q8–Anicolor	

=== July ===
Date	Race name	Location	UCI Rating	Winner	Team	Ref.
2–5 July	Sibiu Cycling Tour	Romania	2.1	Giovanni Aleotti (ITA)	Bora–Hansgrohe	
3 July	Giro del Medio Brenta	Italy	1.2	Thomas Pesenti (ITA)	Beltrami TSA–Tre Colli	
5 July	Trofeo Città di Brescia	Italy	1.2	Riccardo Verza (ITA)	Zalf Euromobil Fior	
9 July	Visegrad 4 Bicycle Race-GP Czech Republic	Czech Republic	1.2	Adam Ťoupalík (CZE)	Elkov–Kasper	
10 July	2 Districtenpijl-Ekeren-Deurne	Belgium	1.2	Coen Vermeltfoort (NED)	VolkerWessels Cycling Team	
10 July	Visegrad 4 Bicycle Race-GP Poland	Poland	1.2	Marceli Bogusławski (POL)	HRE Mazowsze Serce Polski	
10 July	Grand Prix de la ville de Nogent-sur-Oise	France	1.2	Alexander Richardson (GBR)	Saint Piran	
13–17 July	Giro della Valle d'Aosta	Italy	2.2U	Lenny Martinez (FRA)	Équipe Continentale Groupama–FDJ	
16–17 July	Gemenc GP	Hungary	2.2	Luke Mudgway (NZL)	Bolton Equities Black Spoke Pro Cycling	
23 July	Grand Prix Erciyes	Turkey	1.2	Jeroen Meijers (NED)	Terengganu Polygon Cycling Team	
23 July	Visegrad 4 Bicycle Race-Kerékpárverseny	Hungary	1.2	Adam Ťoupalík (CZE)	Elkov–Kasper	
24 July	Grand Prix Kayseri	Turkey	1.2	Anatoliy Budyak (UKR)	Terengganu Polygon Cycling Team	
24 July	GP Kranj	Slovenia	1.2	Andrea Peron (ITA)	Team Novo Nordisk	
24 July	Visegrad 4 Bicycle Race-GP Slovakia	Slovakia	1.2	Thomas Pesenti (ITA)	Beltrami TSA–Tre Colli	
24 July	Grand Prix de la ville de Pérenchies	France	1.2	Laurence Pithie (NZL)	Équipe Continentale Groupama–FDJ	
25 July	Prueba Villafranca de Ordizia	Spain	1.1	Simon Yates (GBR)	Team BikeExchange–Jayco	
26 July	Memoriał Andrzeja Trochanowskiego	Poland	1.2	Tobias Nolde (GER)	P&S Benotti	
27–28 July	Vuelta a Castilla y León	Spain	2.1	Simon Yates (GBR)	Team BikeExchange–Jayco	
27–30 July	Dookoła Mazowsza	Poland	2.2	Marceli Bogusławski (POL)	HRE Mazowsze Serce Polski	
27–31 July	Tour d'Alsace	France	2.2	Finlay Pickering (GBR)	Équipe Continentale Groupama–FDJ	
29 July – 1 August	Kreiz Breizh Elites	France	2.2	Lucas Eriksson (SWE)	Riwal Cycling Team	
31 July	Puchar Ministra Obrony Narodowej	Poland	1.2	Jesper Rasch (NED)	Abloc CT	
31 July	Circuito de Getxo	Spain	1.1	Juan Ayuso (ESP)	UAE Team Emirates	
31 July	Grand Prix Yahyalı	Turkey	1.2	Oleksandr Prevar (UKR)	Spor Toto Cycling Team	

=== August ===
Date	Race name	Location	UCI Rating	Winner	Team	Ref.
4–7 August	Czech Cycling Tour	Czech Republic	2.1	Lorenzo Rota (ITA)	Intermarché–Wanty–Gobert Matériaux	
4–15 August	Volta a Portugal	Portugal	2.1	Mauricio Moreira (URU)	Glassdrive–Q8–Anicolor	
5–14 August	Tour de Guadeloupe	France	2.2	Stefan Bennett (FRA)	EuroCyclingTrips Pro Cycling	
6 August	Scandinavian Race Uppsala	Sweden	1.2	Rasmus Bøgh Wallin (DEN)	Restaurant Suri–Carl Ras	
6 August	La Maurienne	France	1.2	Matthew Dinham (AUS)	Team BridgeLane	
7 August	Grote Prijs Jef Scherens	Belgium	1.1	Victor Campenaerts (BEL)	Lotto–Soudal	
9–11 August	Tour de l'Ain	France	2.1	Guillaume Martin (FRA)	Cofidis	
9–13 August	Tour of Szeklerland	Romania	2.2	Szymon Rekita (POL)	Voster ATS Team	
13 August	Memoriał Henryka Łasaka	Poland	1.2	Tomasz Budziński (POL)	HRE Mazowsze Serce Polski	
14 August	Polynormande	France	1.1	Franck Bonnamour (FRA)	B&B Hotels–KTM	
14 August	Memoriał Jana Magiery	Poland	1.2	Michael Boroš (CZE)	Elkov–Kasper	
14 August	Gran Premio di Poggiana	Italy	1.2U	Nicolò Buratti (ITA)	Cycling Team Friuli ASD	
16 August	GP Capodarco	Italy	1.2U	Nicolò Buratti (ITA)	Cycling Team Friuli ASD	
18 August	Grand Prix Tomarza	Turkey	1.2	Yacine Hamza (ALG)	Algeria (national team)	
16–19 August	Tour du Limousin	France	2.1	Alex Aranburu (ESP)	Movistar Team	
18–21 August	Baltic Chain Tour	Estonia	2.2	Rait Ärm (EST)	Estonia (national team)	
19 August	Grand Prix Kapuzbaşı	Turkey	1.2	Mykhaylo Kononenko (UKR)	Sakarya BB Pro Team	
21 August	Schaal Sels	Belgium	1.1	Arnaud De Lie (BEL)	Lotto–Soudal	
21 August	Grand Prix Develi	Turkey	1.2	Sainbayaryn Jambaljamts (MGL)	Terengganu Polygon Cycling Team	
21 August	Grand Prix Cappadocia	Turkey	1.2	Anton Kuzmin (KAZ)	Almaty Cycling Team	
23 August	Egmont Cycling Race	Belgium	1.1	Arnaud De Lie (BEL)	Lotto–Soudal	
23–26 August	Tour Poitou-Charentes en Nouvelle-Aquitaine	France	2.1	Stefan Küng (SUI)	Groupama–FDJ	
24 August	Druivenkoers Overijse	Belgium	1.1	Matis Louvel (FRA)	Arkéa–Samsic	
25–28 August	Tour of Sakarya	Turkey	2.2	Mykhaylo Kononenko (UKR)	Sakarya BB Pro Team	
27 August–1 September	Tour of Bulgaria	Bulgaria	2.2	Kyrylo Tsarenko (UKR)	Gallina Ecotek Lucchini	
28 August	Ronde van de Achterhoek	Netherlands	1.2	Coen Vermeltfoort (NED)	VolkerWessels Cycling Team	

=== September ===
Date	Race name	Location	UCI Rating	Winner	Team	Ref.
1–3 September	Flanders Tomorrow Tour	Belgium	2.2U	Lars Boven (NED)	Jumbo–Visma Development Team	
1–4 September	Giro della Regione Friuli Venezia Giulia	Italy	2.2	Emiel Verstrynge (BEL)	Alpecin–Fenix Development Team	
3 September	Lillehammer GP	Norway	1.2	Magnus Bak Klaris (DEN)	Restaurant Suri–Carl Ras	
3–4 September	In the Steps of Romans	Bulgaria	2.2	Maciej Paterski (POL)	Voster ATS Team	
4 September	Gylne Gutuer	Norway	1.2	André Drege (NOR)	Team Coop	
4 September	Tour du Doubs	France	1.1	Valentin Madouas (FRA)	Groupama–FDJ	
6–11 September	Turul Romaniei	Romania	2.1	Mark Stewart (GBR)	Bolton Equities Black Spoke Pro Cycling	
8–11 September	Okolo Jižních Čech	Czech Republic	2.2	Rasmus Bøgh Wallin (DEN)	Restaurant Suri–Carl Ras	
11 September	Grand Prix de la Somme	France	1.2	Rait Ärm (EST)	Équipe Continentale Groupama–FDJ	
13–17 September	Okolo Slovenska	Slovakia	2.1	Josef Černý (CZE)	Quick-Step Alpha Vinyl Team	
14 September	Giro di Toscana	Italy	1.1	Marc Hirschi (SUI)	UAE Team Emirates	
14–17 September	Tour de Serbie	Serbia	2.2	Dawit Yemane (ERI)	Bike Aid	
16 September	Kampioenschap van Vlaanderen	Belgium	1.1	Fabio Jakobsen (NED)	Quick-Step Alpha Vinyl Team	
17 September	Memorial Marco Pantani	Italy	1.1	Cancelled due to the bad weather in the Italian region Emilia-Romagna		
17 September	Grote Prijs Rik Van Looy	Belgium	1.2	Coen Vermeltfoort (NED)	VolkerWessels Cycling Team	
18 September	Gooikse Pijl	Belgium	1.1	Gerben Thijssen (BEL)	Intermarché–Wanty–Gobert Matériaux	
18 September	Grand Prix d'Isbergues	France	1.1	Arnaud Démare (FRA)	Groupama–FDJ	
21 September	Omloop van het Houtland	Belgium	1.1	Jasper Philipsen (BEL)	Alpecin–Premier Tech	
25 September	Paris–Chauny	France	1.1	Simone Consonni (ITA)	Cofidis	
27 September	Ruota d'Oro	Italy	1.2U	Jordan Labrosse (FRA)	AG2R Citroën U23 Team	
27 September–2 October	CRO Race	Croatia	2.1	Matej Mohorič (SVN)	Team Bahrain Victorious	
28 September–2 October	Ronde de l'Isard	France	2.2U	Johannes Staune-Mittet (NOR)	Jumbo–Visma Development Team	
29 September	Coppa Ugo Agostoni	Italy	1.1	Sjoerd Bax (NED)	Alpecin–Premier Tech	

=== October ===
Date	Race name	Location	UCI Rating	Winner	Team	Ref.
2 October	Piccolo Giro di Lombardia	Italy	1.2U	Alec Segaert (BEL)	Lotto–Soudal U23	
2 October	Tour de Vendée	France	1.1	Bryan Coquard (FRA)	Cofidis	
2 October	Famenne Ardenne Classic	Belgium	1.1	Axel Zingle (FRA)	Cofidis	
4 October	Binche–Chimay–Binche	Belgium	1.1	Christophe Laporte (FRA)	Team Jumbo–Visma	
6 October	Paris–Bourges	France	1.1	Jasper Philipsen (BEL)	Alpecin–Premier Tech	
9 October	Memorial Rik Van Steenbergen	Belgium	1.1	Tim Merlier (BEL)	Alpecin–Premier Tech	
9 October	Paris–Tours Espoirs	France	1.2U	Per Strand Hagenes (NOR)	Jumbo–Visma Development Team	
12 October	Giro del Veneto	Italy	1.1	Matteo Trentin (ITA)	UAE Team Emirates	
16 October	Chrono des Nations	France	1.1	Stefan Küng (SUI)	Groupama–FDJ	
16 October	Chrono des Nations Espoirs	France	1.2U	Alec Segaert (BEL)	Belgium (national team)	
16 October	Veneto Classic	Italy	1.1	Marc Hirschi (SUI)	UAE Team Emirates	
