= 2025 Team Bahrain Victorious season =

Team Bahrain Victorious
- 2025 season
- UCI code: TBM
- Status: UCI WorldTeam
- Manager: Milan Eržen (SVN)
- Based: Bahrain
- Bicycles: Merida
- Groupset: Shimano

Season victories
- Stage race overall: 1
- Stage race stages: 6
- Most wins: Santiago Buitrago (COL); Lenny Martinez (FRA) (3 wins each)

The 2025 season for the Team Bahrain Victorious team is the team's 9th season in existence, all of which have been as a UCI WorldTeam.

== Team roster ==
All ages are as of 1 January 2025, the first day of the 2025 season.

As of 5 January 2025.

Rider	Date of birth
Nikias Arndt (GER)	18 November 1991 (aged 33)
Phil Bauhaus (GER)	8 July 1994 (aged 30)
Pello Bilbao (ESP)	25 February 1990 (aged 34)
Alberto Bruttomesso (ITA)	30 October 2003 (aged 21)
Santiago Buitrago (COL)	26 September 1999 (aged 25)
Nicolò Buratti (ITA)	7 July 2001 (aged 23)
Damiano Caruso (ITA)	12 October 1987 (aged 37)
Roman Ermakov (RUS)	6 October 2004 (aged 20)
Žak Eržen (SLO)	19 October 2005 (aged 19)
Afonso Eulálio (POR)	30 September 2001 (aged 23)
Matevž Govekar (SLO)	17 April 2000 (aged 24)
Kamil Gradek (POL)	17 September 1990 (aged 34)
Jack Haig (AUS)	6 September 1993 (aged 31)
Rainer Kepplinger (AUT)	19 August 1997 (aged 27)
Lenny Martinez (FRA)	11 July 2003 (aged 21)

Rider	Date of birth
Fran Miholjević (CRO)	2 August 2002 (aged 22)
Matej Mohorič (SLO)	19 October 1994 (aged 30)
Mathijs Paasschens (NED)	18 March 1996 (aged 28)
Andrea Pasqualon (ITA)	2 January 1988 (aged 36)
Finlay Pickering (GBR)	27 January 2003 (aged 21)
Daniel Skerl (ITA)	21 March 2003 (aged 21)
Robert Stannard (AUS)	16 September 1998 (aged 26)
Oliver Stockwell (GBR)	7 June 2002 (aged 22)
Antonio Tiberi (ITA)	24 June 2001 (aged 23)
Torstein Træen (NOR)	16 July 1995 (aged 29)
Sergio Tu (TPE)	24 February 1997 (aged 27)
Max van der Meulen (NED)	13 January 2004 (aged 20)
Vlad Van Mechelen (BEL)	2 June 2004 (aged 20)
Fred Wright (GBR)	13 June 1999 (aged 25)
Edoardo Zambanini (ITA)	21 April 2001 (aged 23)

== Season victories ==
Date	Race	Competition	Rider	Country	Location	Ref.
6 February	Volta a la Comunitat Valenciana, stage 2	UCI ProSeries	Santiago Buitrago (COL)	Spain	Benifato	
8 February	Volta a la Comunitat Valenciana, stage 4	UCI ProSeries	Santiago Buitrago (COL)	Spain	Morella	
9 February	Volta a la Comunitat Valenciana, overall	UCI ProSeries	Santiago Buitrago (COL)	Spain		
13 March	Paris–Nice, stage 5	UCI World Tour	Lenny Martinez (FRA)	France	La Côte-Saint-André	
3 May	Tour de Romandie, stage 4	UCI World Tour	Lenny Martinez (FRA)	Switzerland	Thyon	
15 June	Critérium du Dauphiné, stage 8	UCI World Tour	Lenny Martinez (FRA)	France	Plateau de Mont-Cenis	
8 August	Vuelta a Burgos, stage 4	UCI ProSeries	Damiano Caruso (ITA)	Spain	Regumiel de la Sierra	
