= 2023 Okolo Slovenska =

2023 UCI Europe Tour

Race details
- Dates: 13 – 17 September 2023
- Stages: 5
- Distance: 727.7 km (452.2 mi)
- Winning time: 18h 28' 30"

Results
Jersey awarded to the overall winner	Winner	Rémi Cavagna (FRA)	(Soudal–Quick-Step)
	Second	Stefan Küng (SUI)	(Groupama–FDJ)
	Third	Milan Vader (NED)	(Team Jumbo–Visma)
Jersey awarded to the points classification winner	Points	Tim Merlier (BEL)	(Soudal–Quick-Step)
Jersey awarded to the mountains classification winner	Mountains	Milan Vader (NED)	(Team Jumbo–Visma)
Jersey awarded to the youth classification winner	Youth	Colby Simmons (USA)	(Team Jumbo–Visma)
	Team	(Belgium) Soudal–Quick-Step	

The 2023 Okolo Slovenska (transl. Tour of Slovakia) is the 67th edition of the Okolo Slovenska road cycling stage race. It is being held between 13 and 17 September 2022, as a category 2.1 event on the 2023 UCI Europe Tour.

== Teams ==
Four of the eighteen UCI WorldTeams, six UCI ProTeams, eleven UCI Continental teams (of which two are native Slovak teams) make up the twenty-one participating teams in the race.

UCI WorldTeams

- Astana Qazaqstan Team
- Groupama–FDJ
- Soudal–Quick-Step
- Team Jumbo–Visma

UCI ProTeams

- Caja Rural–Seguros RGA
- Eolo–Kometa
- Equipo Kern Pharma
- Green Project–Bardiani–CSF–Faizanè
- Human Powered Health
- Team Corratec–Selle Italia

UCI Continental Teams

- Adria Mobil
- ATT Investments
- Cycling Team Friuli ASD
- Dukla Banská Bystrica
- Elkov–Kasper
- Epronex - Hungary Cycling Team
- HRE Mazowsze Serce Polski
- Hrinkow Advarics
- RRK Group–Pierre Baguette–Benzinol
- VolkerWessels Cycling Team
- Voster ATS Team

== Route ==
Stage characteristics and winners
Stage	Date	Route	Distance	Type	Winner
1	13 September	Košice to Košice	172.7 km (107.3 mi)	Hilly stage	Rémi Cavagna (FRA)
2	14 September	Prešov to Poprad	143.9 km (89.4 mi)	Hilly stage	Tim Merlier (BEL)
3	15 September	Ružomberok to Martin	171.6 km (106.6 mi)	Hilly stage	Andrea Bagioli (ITA)
4	16 September	Prievidza to Nitra	149 km (93 mi)	Hilly stage	Tim Merlier (BEL)
5	17 September	Hlohovec to Púchov	183.5 km (114.0 mi)	Flat stage	Kasper Asgreen (DEN)
Total			727.7 km (452.2 mi)		

== Stages ==
=== Stage 1 ===
13 September 2023 — Košice to Košice, 172.7 km (107.3 mi)

Stage 1 Result
Rank	Rider	Team	Time
1	Rémi Cavagna (FRA)	Soudal–Quick-Step	3h 43' 27"
2	Mulu Hailemichael (ETH)	Caja Rural–Seguros RGA	+ 1' 45"
3	Kasper Asgreen (DEN)	Soudal–Quick-Step	+ 2' 09"
4	Milan Vader (NED)	Team Jumbo–Visma	+ 2' 09"
5	Stefan Küng (SUI)	Groupama–FDJ	+ 2' 09"
6	Bart Lemmen (NED)	Human Powered Health	+ 2' 11"
7	Bruno Armirail (FRA)	Groupama–FDJ	+ 2' 45"
8	Urko Berrade (ESP)	Equipo Kern Pharma	+ 2' 55"
9	Antoine Debons (SUI)	Team Corratec–Selle Italia	+ 3' 01"
10	Davide Bais (ITA)	Eolo–Kometa	+ 3' 01"

General classification after Stage 1
Rank	Rider	Team	Time
1	Rémi Cavagna (FRA)	Soudal–Quick-Step	3h 43' 11"
2	Mulu Hailemichael (ETH)	Caja Rural–Seguros RGA	+ 1' 55"
3	Kasper Asgreen (DEN)	Soudal–Quick-Step	+ 2' 16"
4	Milan Vader (NED)	Team Jumbo–Visma	+ 2' 22"
5	Stefan Küng (SUI)	Groupama–FDJ	+ 2' 23"
6	Bart Lemmen (NED)	Human Powered Health	+ 2' 25"
7	Bruno Armirail (FRA)	Groupama–FDJ	+ 3' 01"
8	Urko Berrade (ESP)	Equipo Kern Pharma	+ 3' 11"
9	Antoine Debons (SUI)	Team Corratec–Selle Italia	+ 3' 17"
10	Davide Bais (ITA)	Eolo–Kometa	+ 3' 17"

=== Stage 2 ===
14 September 2023 — Prešov to Poprad, 143.9 km (89.4 mi)

Stage 2 Result
Rank	Rider	Team	Time
1	Tim Merlier (BEL)	Soudal–Quick-Step	3h 25' 53"
2	Cees Bol (NED)	Astana Qazaqstan Team	+ 0"
3	Colby Simmons (USA)	Team Jumbo–Visma	+ 0"
4	Alberto Bruttomesso (ITA)	Cycling Team Friuli ASD	+ 0"
5	Daniel Skerl (ITA)	Cycling Team Friuli ASD	+ 0"
6	Iúri Leitão (POR)	Caja Rural–Seguros RGA	+ 0"
7	Lukáš Kubiš (SVK)	Dukla Banská Bystrica	+ 0"
8	Charles-Étienne Chrétien (CAN)	Human Powered Health	+ 0"
9	Stanisław Aniołkowski (POL)	Human Powered Health	+ 0"
10	Luca Colnaghi (ITA)	Green Project–Bardiani–CSF–Faizanè	+ 0"

General classification after Stage 2
Rank	Rider	Team	Time
1	Rémi Cavagna (FRA)	Soudal–Quick-Step	7h 09' 04"
2	Mulu Hailemichael (ETH)	Caja Rural–Seguros RGA	+ 1' 55"
3	Kasper Asgreen (DEN)	Soudal–Quick-Step	+ 2' 16"
4	Milan Vader (NED)	Team Jumbo–Visma	+ 2' 22"
5	Stefan Küng (SUI)	Groupama–FDJ	+ 2' 23"
6	Bart Lemmen (NED)	Human Powered Health	+ 2' 25"
7	Bruno Armirail (FRA)	Groupama–FDJ	+ 3' 01"
8	Urko Berrade (ESP)	Equipo Kern Pharma	+ 3' 11"
9	Jakub Otruba (CZE)	ATT Investments	+ 3' 11"
10	Koen Bouwman (NED)	Team Jumbo–Visma	+ 3' 20"

=== Stage 3 ===
15 September 2023 — Ružomberok to Martin, 171.6 km (106.6 mi)

Stage 3 Result
Rank	Rider	Team	Time
1	Andrea Bagioli (ITA)	Soudal–Quick-Step	3h 54' 24"
2	Michele Gazzoli (ITA)	Astana Qazaqstan Team	+ 0"
3	Stefan Küng (SUI)	Groupama–FDJ	+ 0"
4	Rémi Cavagna (FRA)	Soudal–Quick-Step	+ 0"
5	Lukáš Kubiš (SVK)	Dukla Banská Bystrica	+ 0"
6	Pau Miquel (ESP)	Equipo Kern Pharma	+ 0"
7	Koen Bouwman (NED)	Team Jumbo–Visma	+ 0"
8	Bart Lemmen (NED)	Human Powered Health	+ 0"
9	Urko Berrade (ESP)	Equipo Kern Pharma	+ 0"
10	Gijs Leemreize (NED)	Team Jumbo–Visma	+ 0"

General classification after Stage 3
Rank	Rider	Team	Time
1	Rémi Cavagna (FRA)	Soudal–Quick-Step	11h 03' 27"
2	Stefan Küng (SUI)	Groupama–FDJ	+ 2' 20"
3	Mulu Hailemichael (ETH)	Caja Rural–Seguros RGA	+ 2' 21"
4	Milan Vader (NED)	Team Jumbo–Visma	+ 2' 23"
5	Bart Lemmen (NED)	Human Powered Health	+ 2' 26"
6	Kasper Asgreen (DEN)	Soudal–Quick-Step	+ 2' 42"
7	Urko Berrade (ESP)	Equipo Kern Pharma	+ 3' 12"
8	Koen Bouwman (NED)	Team Jumbo–Visma	+ 3' 21"
9	Bruno Armirail (FRA)	Groupama–FDJ	+ 3' 27"
10	Jakub Otruba (CZE)	ATT Investments	+ 3' 37"

=== Stage 4 ===
16 September 2023 — Prievidza to Nitra, 149 km (93 mi)

Stage 4 Result
Rank	Rider	Team	Time
1	Tim Merlier (BEL)	Soudal–Quick-Step	3h 21' 26"
2	Cees Bol (NED)	Astana Qazaqstan Team	+ 0"
3	Luca Colnaghi (ITA)	Green Project–Bardiani–CSF–Faizanè	+ 0"
4	Mirco Maestri (ITA)	Eolo–Kometa	+ 0"
5	Daniel Skerl (ITA)	Cycling Team Friuli ASD	+ 0"
6	Colby Simmons (USA)	Team Jumbo–Visma	+ 0"
7	Iúri Leitão (POR)	Caja Rural–Seguros RGA	+ 0"
8	Stanisław Aniołkowski (POL)	Human Powered Health	+ 0"
9	Patryk Stosz (POL)	Voster ATS Team	+ 0"
10	Dominik Neuman (CZE)	Elkov–Kasper	+ 0"

General classification after Stage 4
Rank	Rider	Team	Time
1	Rémi Cavagna (FRA)	Soudal–Quick-Step	14h 24' 53"
2	Stefan Küng (SUI)	Groupama–FDJ	+ 2' 16"
3	Milan Vader (NED)	Team Jumbo–Visma	+ 2' 20"
4	Mulu Hailemichael (ETH)	Caja Rural–Seguros RGA	+ 2' 20"
5	Bart Lemmen (NED)	Human Powered Health	+ 2' 29"
6	Kasper Asgreen (DEN)	Soudal–Quick-Step	+ 2' 42"
7	Urko Berrade (ESP)	Equipo Kern Pharma	+ 3' 15"
8	Koen Bouwman (NED)	Team Jumbo–Visma	+ 3' 24"
9	Bruno Armirail (FRA)	Groupama–FDJ	+ 3' 27"
10	Jakub Otruba (CZE)	ATT Investments	+ 3' 37"

=== Stage 5 ===
17 September 2023 — Hlohovec to Púchov, 183.5 km (114.0 mi)

Stage 5 Result
Rank	Rider	Team	Time
1	Kasper Asgreen (DEN)	Soudal–Quick-Step	4h 03' 35"
2	Bert Van Lerberghe (BEL)	Soudal–Quick-Step	+ 2"
3	Tim Merlier (BEL)	Soudal–Quick-Step	+ 2"
4	Iúri Leitão (POR)	Caja Rural–Seguros RGA	+ 2"
5	Mirco Maestri (ITA)	Eolo–Kometa	+ 2"
6	Luca Colnaghi (ITA)	Green Project–Bardiani–CSF–Faizanè	+ 2"
7	Colby Simmons (USA)	Team Jumbo–Visma	+ 2"
8	Stanisław Aniołkowski (POL)	Human Powered Health	+ 2"
9	Alberto Bruttomesso (ITA)	Cycling Team Friuli ASD	+ 2"
10	Cees Bol (NED)	Astana Qazaqstan Team	+ 2"

General classification after Stage 5
Rank	Rider	Team	Time
1	Rémi Cavagna (FRA)	Soudal–Quick-Step	18h 28' 30"
2	Stefan Küng (SUI)	Groupama–FDJ	+ 2' 16"
3	Milan Vader (NED)	Team Jumbo–Visma	+ 2' 20"
4	Mulu Hailemichael (ETH)	Caja Rural–Seguros RGA	+ 2' 20"
5	Bart Lemmen (NED)	Human Powered Health	+ 2' 29"
6	Kasper Asgreen (DEN)	Soudal–Quick-Step	+ 2' 30"
7	Urko Berrade (ESP)	Equipo Kern Pharma	+ 3' 15"
8	Koen Bouwman (NED)	Team Jumbo–Visma	+ 3' 24"
9	Bruno Armirail (FRA)	Groupama–FDJ	+ 3' 27"
10	Jakub Otruba (CZE)	ATT Investments	+ 3' 37"

== Classification leadership table ==
Classification leadership by stage
Stage	Winner	General classification	Points classification	Mountains classification	Young rider classification	Team classification
1	Rémi Cavagna	Rémi Cavagna	Rémi Cavagna	Milan Vader	Colby Simmons	Soudal–Quick-Step
2	Tim Merlier	Rémi Cavagna	Rémi Cavagna	Milan Vader	Colby Simmons	Soudal–Quick-Step
3	Andrea Bagioli	Rémi Cavagna	Rémi Cavagna	Milan Vader	Colby Simmons	Soudal–Quick-Step
4	Tim Merlier	Rémi Cavagna	Rémi Cavagna	Milan Vader	Colby Simmons	Soudal–Quick-Step
5	Kasper Asgreen	Rémi Cavagna	Tim Merlier	Milan Vader	Colby Simmons	Soudal–Quick-Step
Final		Rémi Cavagna	Tim Merlier	Milan Vader	Colby Simmons	Soudal–Quick-Step

== Classification standings ==
Legend
Denotes the winner of the general classification	Denotes the winner of the mountains classification
Denotes the winner of the points classification	Denotes the winner of the young rider classification

=== General classification ===
Final general classification (1–10)
Rank	Rider	Team	Time
1	Rémi Cavagna (FRA)	Soudal–Quick-Step	18h 28' 30"
2	Stefan Küng (SUI)	Groupama–FDJ	+ 2' 16"
3	Milan Vader (NED)	Team Jumbo–Visma	+ 2' 20"
4	Mulu Hailemichael (ETH)	Caja Rural–Seguros RGA	+ 2' 20"
5	Bart Lemmen (NED)	Human Powered Health	+ 2' 29"
6	Kasper Asgreen (DEN)	Soudal–Quick-Step	+ 2' 30"
7	Urko Berrade (ESP)	Equipo Kern Pharma	+ 3' 15"
8	Koen Bouwman (NED)	Team Jumbo–Visma	+ 3' 24"
9	Bruno Armirail (FRA)	Groupama–FDJ	+ 3' 27"
10	Jakub Otruba (CZE)	ATT Investments	+ 3' 37"

=== Points classification ===
Final points classification (1–10)
Rank	Rider	Team	Points
1	Tim Merlier (BEL)	Soudal–Quick-Step	52
2	Rémi Cavagna (FRA)	Soudal–Quick-Step	44
3	Kasper Asgreen (DEN)	Soudal–Quick-Step	42
4	Stefan Küng (SUI)	Groupama–FDJ	35
5	Cees Bol (NED)	Astana Qazaqstan Team	31
6	Milan Vader (NED)	Team Jumbo–Visma	29
7	Colby Simmons (USA)	Team Jumbo–Visma	24
8	Andrea Bagioli (ITA)	Soudal–Quick-Step	20
9	Iúri Leitão (POR)	Caja Rural–Seguros RGA	20
10	Luca Colnaghi (ITA)	Green Project–Bardiani–CSF–Faizanè	19

=== Mountains classification ===
Final mountains classification (1–10)
Rank	Rider	Team	Points
1	Milan Vader (NED)	Team Jumbo–Visma	36
2	Matěj Zahálka (CZE)	Elkov–Kasper	20
3	Andrea Pietrobon (ITA)	Eolo–Kometa	18
4	Jiří Petruš (CZE)	ATT Investments	14
5	Koen Bouwman (NED)	Team Jumbo–Visma	12
6	Daniel Turek (CZE)	ATT Investments	9
7	Charlie Quarterman (GBR)	Team Corratec–Selle Italia	7
8	Mirco Maestri (ITA)	Eolo–Kometa	6
9	Sebastian Schönberger (AUT)	Human Powered Health	6
10	Rémi Cavagna (FRA)	Soudal–Quick-Step	6

=== Young rider classification ===
Final young rider classification (1–10)
Rank	Rider	Team	Time
1	Colby Simmons (USA)	Team Jumbo–Visma	18h 34' 22"
2	Javier Serrano (ESP)	Eolo–Kometa	+ 5"
3	Loe van Belle (NED)	Team Jumbo–Visma	+ 22"
4	Brieuc Rolland (FRA)	Groupama–FDJ	+ 51"
5	Daniel Vysočan (CZE)	RRK Group–Pierre Baguette–Benzinol	+ 51"
6	Alberto Bruttomesso (ITA)	Cycling Team Friuli ASD	+ 2' 11"
7	Samuel Tuka (SVK)	Dukla Banská Bystrica	+ 2' 57"
8	Oliver Stockwell (GBR)	Cycling Team Friuli ASD	+ 2' 57"
9	Alessio Martinelli (ITA)	Green Project–Bardiani–CSF–Faizanè	+ 2' 57"
10	Tomáš Obdržálek (CZE)	Elkov–Kasper	+ 3' 14"

=== Team classification ===
FInal team classification (1–10)
Rank	Team	Time
1	(Belgium) Soudal–Quick-Step	55h 34' 08"
2	(Netherlands) Team Jumbo–Visma	+ 2' 50"
3	(France) Groupama–FDJ	+ 3' 12"
4	(Spain) Caja Rural–Seguros RGA	+ 5' 43"
5	(United States) Human Powered Health	+ 5' 47"
6	(Spain) Equipo Kern Pharma	+ 6' 09"
7	(Italy) Eolo–Kometa	+ 6' 57"
8	(Czech Republic) ATT Investments	+ 6' 57"
9	(Italy) Team Corratec–Selle Italia	+ 8' 19"
10	(Italy) Green Project–Bardiani–CSF–Faizanè	+ 8' 47"
