= 2018 GP Izola =

- 2018 UCI Europe Tour

Race details
- Dates: 25 February 2018
- Stages: 1
- Distance: 106.5 km (66.18 mi)
- Winning time: 2h 35' 43"

Results
	Winner	Dušan Rajović (SRB)	(Adria Mobil)
	Second	Daniel Auer (AUT)	(WSA–Pushbikers)
	Third	Matthew Gibson (GBR)	(JLT–Condor)

The 2018 Grand Prix Izola was the 5th edition of the GP Izola road cycling one day race. It was part of UCI Europe Tour in category 1.2. Due to extreme weather conditions, the race was shortened form 157km to 106.5km.

== Teams ==
Twenty-five teams were invited to take part in the race. These included one UCI Professional Continental team and twenty-four UCI Continental teams.

UCI Professional Continental Teams

- Wilier Triestina–Selle Italia

UCI Continental teams

- Tirol Cycling Team
- Adria Mobil
- Ljubljana Gusto Xaurum
- My Bike–Stevens
- Elkov–Author
- ONE Pro Cycling
- Trevigiani Phonix–Hemus 1896
- Hrinkow Advarics Cycleang
- Sangemini–MG.K Vis Vega
- Team Vorarlberg Santic
- Biesse–Carrera Gavardo
- Kőbánya Cycling Team
- WSA–Pushbikers
- Meridiana–Kamen
- MsTina–Focus
- JLT–Condor
- Cycling Team Friuli
- Meblo Jogi Pro-Concrete
- KK Bled
- Global Cycling Team
- IAM Excelsior
- KK Kranj
- Veloclub Ratisbona
- Cycling Team Graz ARBÖ

== Result ==
Result
Rank	Rider	Team	Time
1	Dušan Rajović (SRB)	Adria Mobil	2h 35' 43"
2	Daniel Auer (AUT)	WSA–Pushbikers	+ 0"
3	Matthew Gibson (GBR)	JLT–Condor	+ 0"
4	Emīls Liepiņš (LAT)	ONE Pro Cycling	+ 0"
5	Jannik Steimle (GER)	Team Vorarlberg Santic	+ 0"
6	Nicolás Tivani (ARG)	Trevigiani Phonix–Hemus 1896	+ 0"
7	Rok Korošec (SLO)	My Bike–Stevens	+ 0"
8	Matteo Draperi (ITA)	Sangemini–MG.K Vis Vega	+ 0"
9	Paolo Totò (ITA)	Sangemini–MG.K Vis Vega	+ 0"
10	Alex Turrin (ITA)	Wilier Triestina–Selle Italia	+ 0"
