= Tilen Finkšt =

Slovenian cyclist

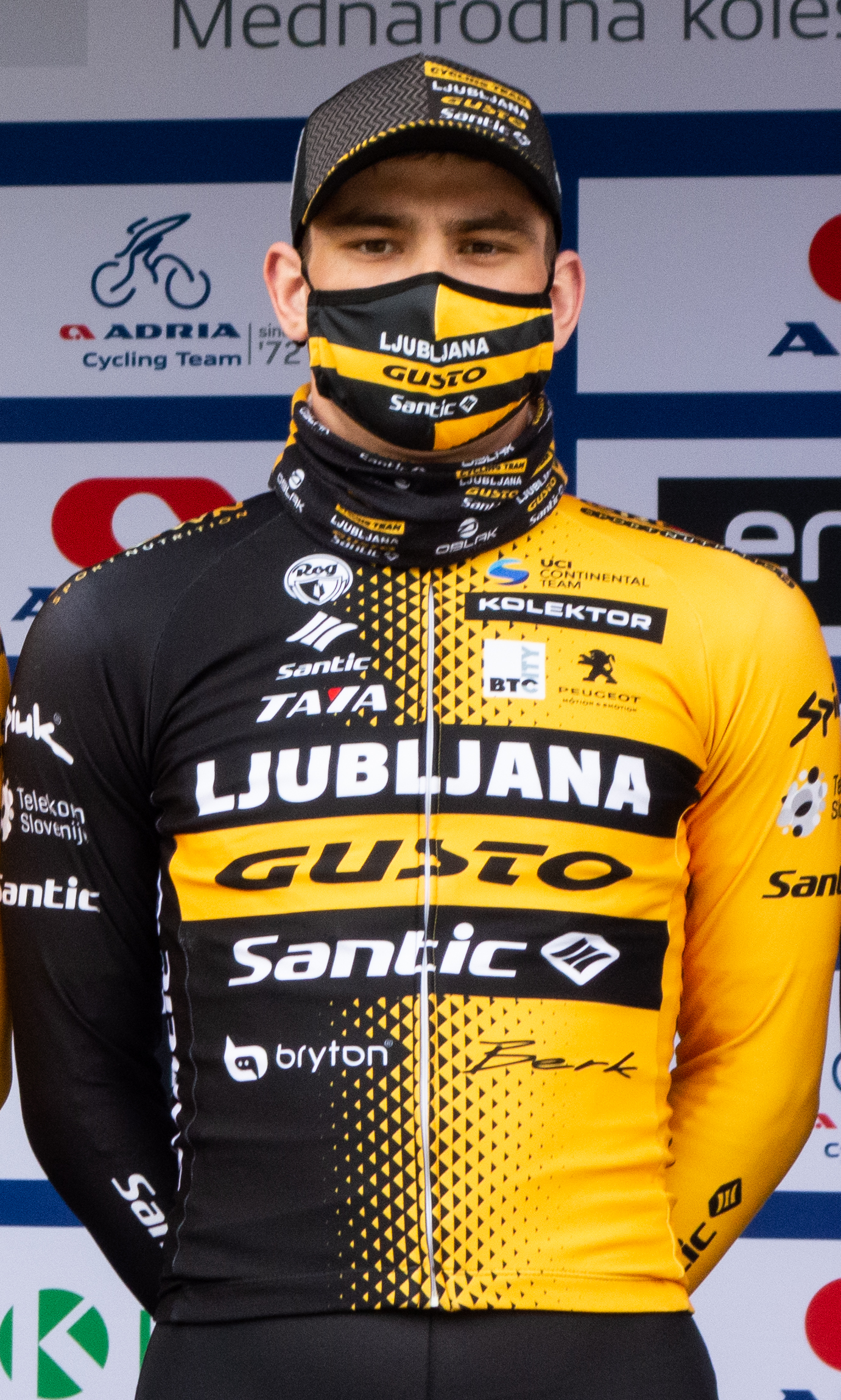
- Finkšt at the 2021 GP Adria Mobil

Personal information
- Born: 6 July 1997 (age 29)
- Height: 1.76 m (5 ft 9 in)
- Weight: 70 kg (154 lb)

Cycling career
- Sport: Cycling
- Current team: Solution Tech NIPPO Rali
- Disciplines: Road; Track
- Role: Rider

Professional teams
- 2016–2021: Radenska–Ljubljana
- 2022–2025: Adria Mobil
- 2026–: Solution Tech NIPPO Rali

Tilen Finkšt (born 6 July 1997) is a Slovenian professional road racing cyclist, who currently rides for UCI ProTeam Solution Tech NIPPO Rali. He also competes in track cycling, having rode in four events at the 2020 UEC European Track Championships.

== Major results ==
2015
1st Road race, National Junior Road Championships
2019
3rd Croatia–Slovenia
2020
2nd Coppa Città di San Daniele
3rd Poreč Trophy
2021
National Track Championships

1st Team sprint
2nd Team pursuit

3rd Poreč Trophy
4th Puchar Ministra Obrony Narodowej
4th Overall Tour de Serbie
10th GP Slovenian Istria
2022
1st Team pursuit, National Track Championships
2nd GP Gorenjska
3rd GP Kranj
4th Road race, Mediterranean Games
4th Poreč Trophy
7th Overall Belgrade Banjaluka
9th GP Slovenian Istria
2023
1st GP Adria Mobil
1st Stage 3 Istrian Spring Trophy
1st Prologue Tour of Bulgaria
3rd GP Goriška & Vipava Valley
5th Overall In the footsteps of the Romans
5th Poreč Trophy
5th GP Slovenian Istria
8th Overall Gemenc Grand Prix
2024
1st Overall Grand Prix Cycliste de Gemenc

1st Points classification
1st Stage 2

1st Visegrad 4 Kerekparverseny
3rd GP Goriška & Vipava Valley
4th GP Brda-Collio
7th Umag Trophy
8th GP Slovenian Istria
