= Alessandro Borgo =

Italian cyclist

Personal information
- Born: 6 February 2005 (age 21) Conegliano, Italy
- Height: 1.83 m (6 ft 0 in)

Cycling career
- Sport: Cycling
- Current team: Team Bahrain Victorious
- Discipline: Road
- Role: Rider

Amateur team
- 2022–2023: Team Work Service Speedy Bike

Professional teams
- 2024–2025: CTF Victorious
- 2026–: Team Bahrain Victorious

Alessandro Borgo (born 6 February 2005) is an Italian cyclist, who currently rides for UCI WorldTeam Team Bahrain Victorious.

== Major results ==
2022
1st Vittorio Veneto-San Boldo
3rd Gran Premio dell'Arno
3rd Gran Premio Neri Sottoli
4th Trofeo Guido Dorigo
10th Overall Giro della Lunigiana
2023
1st Team time trial, National Junior Road Championships
1st Trofeo Fans Club Daniele Bennati
1st Trofeo Autodemolizioni Mignolli Giordano
1st Gran Premio Mocaiana
1st Memorial Ivo Masola
1st Trofeo dell'Uva (ITT)
1st Stage 1 (TTT) Eroica Juniores – Nations' Cup
8th Giro di Primavera
2024
1st Coppa Collecchio
3rd Giro del Medio Brenta
3rd Coppa Città di San Daniele
5th Gent–Wevelgem Beloften
6th Youngster Coast Challenge
8th Gran Premio Industrie del Marmo
9th GP Kranj
10th Giro del Belvedere
2025
1st Road race, National Under-23 Road Championships
1st Gent–Wevelgem Beloften
4th Popolarissima
8th Giro del Belvedere
10th Overall Tour de Bretagne
2026 (1 pro win)
1st Grand Prix Criquielion
3rd Bretagne Classic
9th Gooikse Pijl
