= Alessandro Pessot =

Italian racing cyclist

Personal information
- Born: 1 July 1995 (age 31) Udine, Italy

Cycling career
- Sport: Cycling
- Discipline: Road
- Role: Rider

Amateur teams
- 2015: Selle Italia–Cieffe–Ursus
- 2016–2018: Cycling Team Friuli

Professional team
- 2019–2020: Bardiani–CSF

Alessandro Pessot (born 1 July 1995) is an Italian cyclist, who most recently rode for UCI ProTeam Bardiani–CSF–Faizanè.

== Major results ==
2017
1st Overall Carpathian Couriers Race

1st Stage 1

4th Törökbálint GP – Memorial Imre Riczu
6th Trofeo Città di San Vendemiano
8th Ruota d'Oro
2018
2nd GP Kranj
9th GP Adria Mobil
