= Nicola Venchiarutti =

Italian cyclist (born 1998)

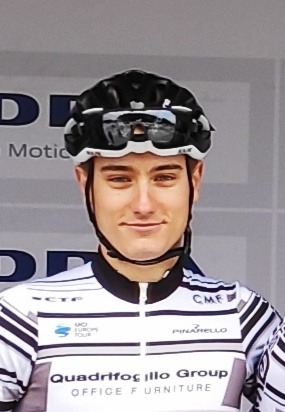
- Venchiarutti in 2019

Personal information
- Born: 7 October 1998 (age 28) Tolmezzo, Friuli, Italy

Cycling career
- Sport: Cycling
- Current team: Retired
- Discipline: Road
- Role: Rider
- Rider type: Sprinter

Amateur team
- 2017–2019: Cycling Team Friuli

Professional teams
- 2020–2021: Androni Giocattoli–Sidermec
- 2022–2023: Work Service–Vitalcare–Vega

Nicola Venchiarutti (born 7 October 1998) is an Italian former cyclist, who competed as a professional from 2020 to 2023.

== Major results ==
2018
2nd GP Adria Mobil
4th Croatia–Slovenia
2019
1st La Popolarissima
1st Ruota d'Oro
1st Stage 8 Girobio
2022
3rd GP Adria Mobil

=== Grand Tour general classification results timeline ===
Grand Tour	2021
Giro d'Italia	132
Tour de France	—
Vuelta a España	—

Legend
—	Did not compete
DNF	Did not finish
