= Marko Kump =

Slovenian cyclist

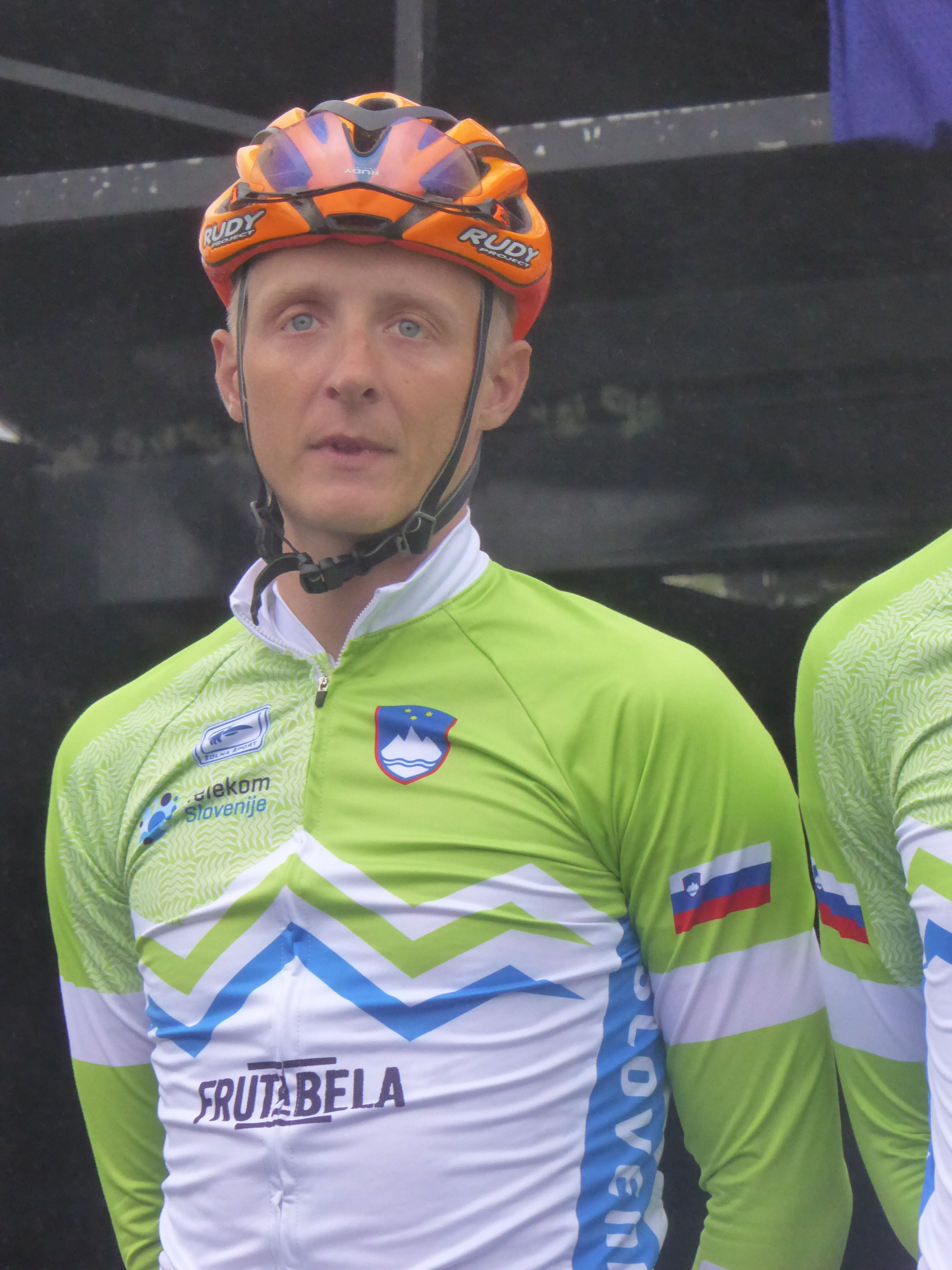
- Kump at the 2018 European Road Cycling Championships

Personal information
- Full name: Marko Kump
- Born: 9 September 1988 (age 38): Novo Mesto, SR Slovenia, SFR Yugoslavia; (now Slovenia)
- Height: 1.80 m (5 ft 11 in)
- Weight: 68 kg (150 lb; 10.7 st)

Cycling career
- Sport: Cycling
- Current team: Kolesarski Klub Novo Mesto
- Disciplines: Road; Track
- Role: Rider (retired); Directeur sportif

Professional teams
- 2007–2010: Adria Mobil
- 2011: Geox–TMC
- 2012: Adria Mobil
- 2013–2014: Saxo–Tinkoff
- 2015: Adria Mobil
- 2016–2017: Lampre–Merida
- 2018: CCC–Sprandi–Polkowice
- 2019–2020: Adria Mobil

Managerial team
- 2021–: Adria Mobil

Marko Kump (born 9 September 1988) is a Slovenian former professional cyclist, who rode professionally between 2007 and 2020 for the Geox–TMC, Tinkoff–Saxo, UAE Team Emirates and CCC–Sprandi–Polkowice teams, as well as four separate spells with the Adria Mobil team. During his career, Kump took seventeen professional victories, seven of which were stage victories at the Tour of Qinghai Lake in 2015 and 2016.

He now works a directeur sportif for the Kolesarski Klub Novo Mesto team, a UCI Continental team.

== Career ==
In 2011, he signed a one-year contract with Adria Mobil for the 2012 season. Kump left Adria Mobil at the end of 2012, and joined Saxo–Tinkoff for the 2013 campaign. He returned to Adria Mobil for the 2015 season.

== Major results ==
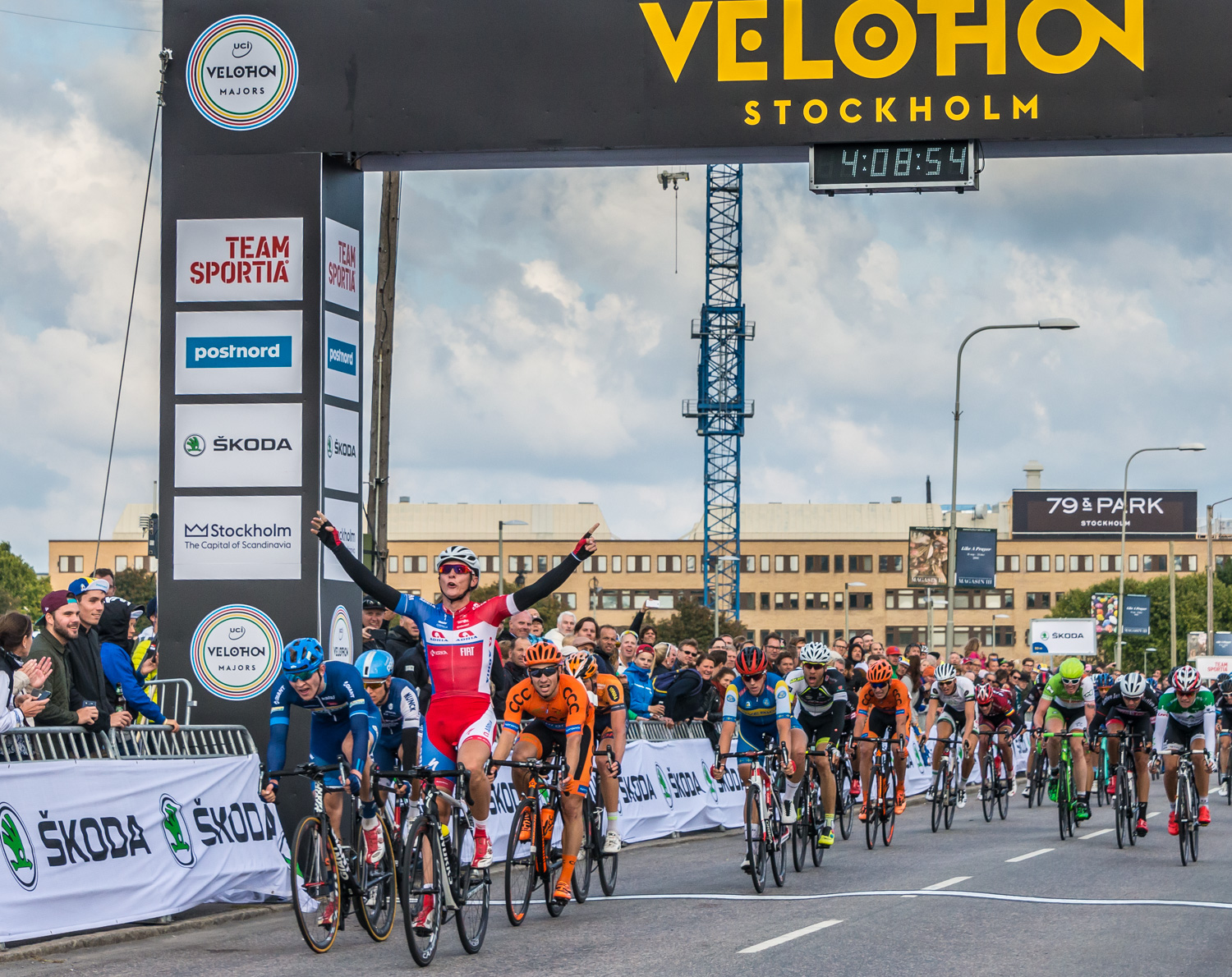
Kump winning the Velothon Stockholm in 2015.

2005
2nd Road race, National Junior Road Championships
2006
6th Road race, UCI Junior World Championships
2007
1st Poreč Trophy
2008
3rd Poreč Trophy
2009
1st Stage 4 Tour of Slovenia
1st Stage 3 Tour de l'Avenir
2nd Road race, Mediterranean Games
2nd Prague–Karlovy Vary–Prague
4th Overall Coupe des nations Ville Saguenay

1st Stage 1

4th Trofeo Zsšdi
5th Gran Premio della Costa Etruschi
6th Road race, UCI Under-23 Road World Championships
6th GP Kranj
6th ZLM Tour
9th Overall Istrian Spring Trophy

1st Stage 1

2010
1st Trofeo Zsšdi
1st Ronde van Vlaanderen Beloften
1st Stage 4 Settimana Internazionale di Coppi e Bartali
2nd Road race, National Under-23 Road Championships
3rd Zagreb–Ljubljana
9th Giro del Friuli
2012
1st Banja Luka–Beograd I
1st Grand Prix Südkärnten
1st Central European Tour Budapest GP
1st Ljubljana–Zagreb
1st Stage 1 Szlakiem Grodów Piastowskich
2nd Road race, National Road Championships
2nd Banja Luka–Beograd II
2nd Trofeo Matteotti
3rd Overall Istrian Spring Trophy

1st Stage 1

4th Trofeo Zsšdi
5th Overall Course de Solidarność et des Champions Olympiques
6th ProRace Berlin
8th Giro di Toscana
2013
9th Overall World Ports Classic
2015
1st Overall Tour of Małopolska

1st Stages 1 & 2

1st Trofej Umag
1st Poreč Trophy
1st GP Adria Mobil
1st Banja Luka–Beograd I
1st Croatia–Slovenia
1st Velothon Stockholm
Tour of Qinghai Lake

1st Points classification
1st Stages 1, 2, 6, 9 & 12

Tour d'Azerbaïdjan

1st Points classification
1st Stage 1

1st Stage 2 Tour of Croatia
1st Stage 3 Istrian Spring Trophy
1st Stage 4 Tour of Slovenia
4th GP Laguna
4th GP Izola
7th Gran Premio Industria e Commercio di Prato
9th Banja Luka–Beograd II
2016
Tour of Qinghai Lake

1st Stages 9 & 10

2017
2nd GP Izola
2nd Brussels Cycling Classic
8th EuroEyes Cyclassics
2018
6th Clásica de Almería
2019
1st GP Slovenian Istria
1st GP Adria Mobil
1st GP Kranj
1st Croatia–Slovenia
Tour of Bihor

1st Points classification
1st Stage 1

1st Stage 4 Belgrade–Banja Luka
1st Stage 1 CRO Race
3rd Road race, National Road Championships
5th Trofej Umag
2020
2nd Trofej Umag
4th GP Kranj
