= Velothon Stockholm =

Annual cycling race in Sweden

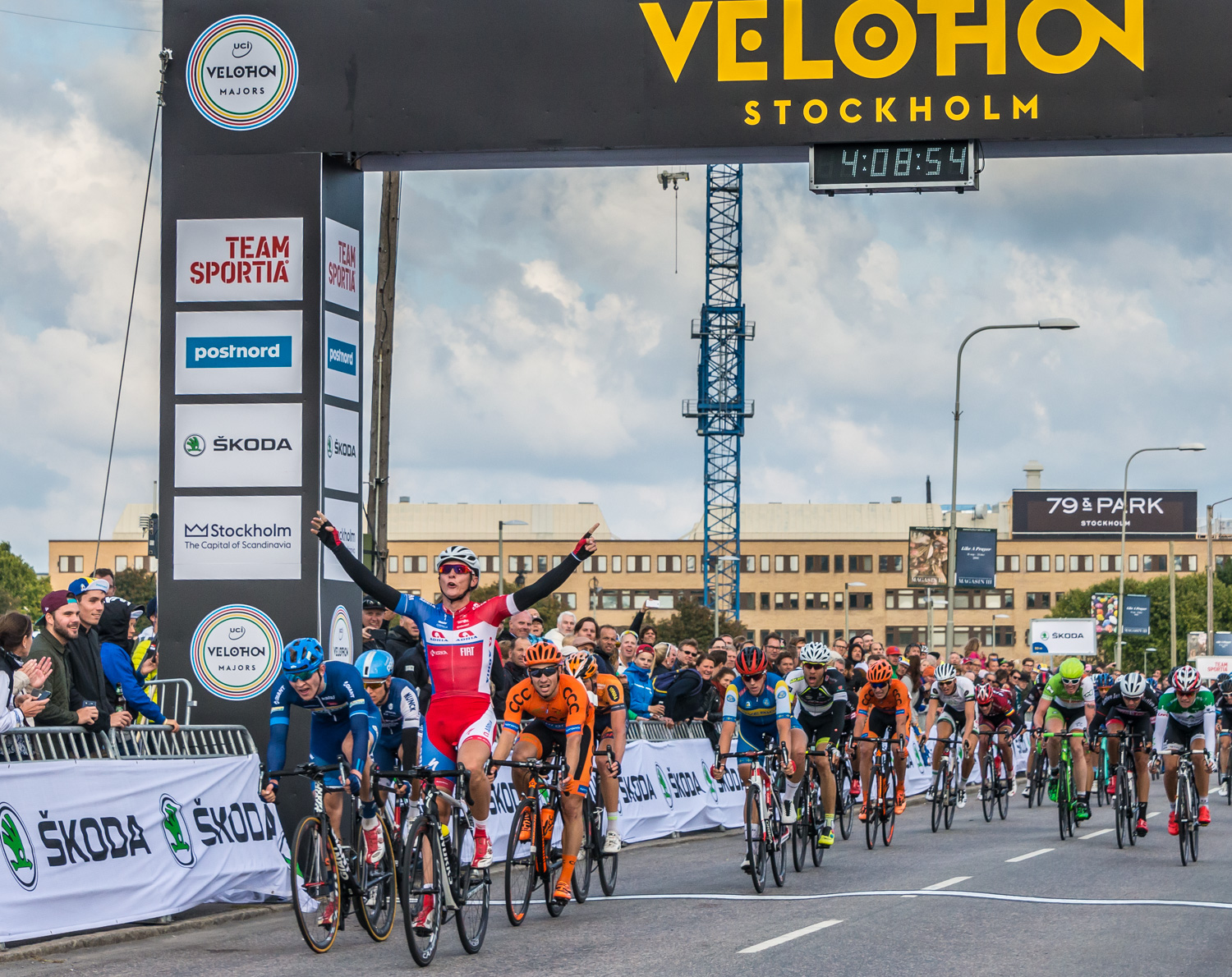
- Velothon Stockholm

Race details
- Discipline: Road
- Competition: UCI Europe Tour 1.1
- Type: One day race
- Organiser: Lagardère Unlimited
- Web site: www.velothon-stockholm.se

History
- First edition: 2015
- Editions: 3
- First winner: Marko Kump (SLO)
- Most wins: No repeat winners
- Most recent: Hannes Forsby (SWE)

Velothon Stockholm is a cycling race held annually in Sweden. It is part of UCI Europe Tour in category 1.1. It is part of the UCI Velothon Majors series of races organised by Lagardère Unlimited, which also includes Velothon Berlin, Velothon Wales and Velothon Vienna. These events are characterised by mass-participation sportives before an elite race along a lengthened route.

After the 2017 race, the organizer, Lagardere, announced that the race was closed down because: “The demand among recreational and competitive cyclists has been too low, resulting in low participation rates.”

== Winners ==
Year	Country	Rider	Team
2015	Slovenia	Marko Kump	Adria Mobil
2016	Sweden	Jimmy Karlsson	
2017	Sweden	Hannes Forsby	
