= Nicolò Buratti =

Italian cyclist

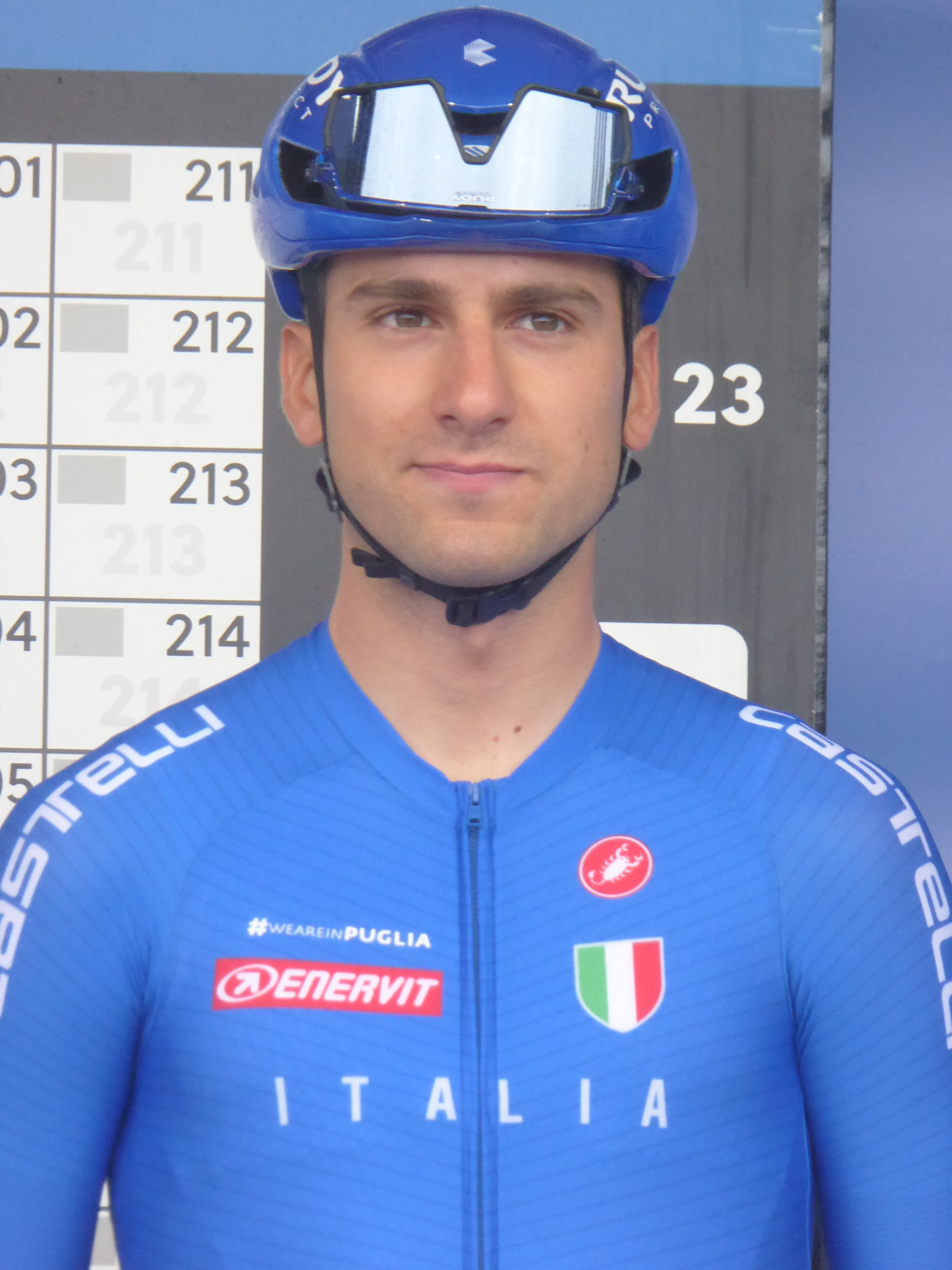
- Buratti in 2023

Personal information
- Born: 7 July 2001 (age 25) Udine, Italy

Cycling career
- Sport: Cycling
- Current team: MBH Bank CSB Telecom Fort
- Discipline: Road
- Role: Rider

Amateur teams
- 2014–2017: Pedale Manzanese
- 2018–2019: Danieli 1914
- 2020: Pedale Scaligero

Professional teams
- 2021–2023: Cycling Team Friuli ASD
- 2023–2025: Team Bahrain Victorious
- 2026–: MBH Bank CSB Telecom Fort

Nicolò Buratti (born 7 July 2001) is an Italian cyclist, who currently rides for UCI ProTeam MBH Bank CSB Telecom Fort. Buratti joined UCI WorldTeam Team Bahrain Victorious in April 2023, having been prior due to join for the 2024 season.

== Major results ==
2022
1st GP Capodarco
1st Gran Premio Sportivi di Poggiana
2nd Overall Giro della Regione Friuli Venezia Giulia

1st Points classification
1st Stages 1 (TTT) & 4

3rd GP Slovenian Istria
7th Road race, UEC European Under-23 Road Championships
8th Overall Carpathian Couriers Race

1st Prologue

8th Trofeo Città di Brescia
2023
2nd Gent–Wevelgem / Kattekoers-Ieper
2026
1st GP Slovenian Istria
7th Hong Kong Cyclothon

=== Grand Tour general classification results timeline ===
Grand Tour	2025
Giro d'Italia	—
Tour de France	—
Vuelta a España	117

Legend
—	Did not compete
DNF	Did not finish
