= Seth Dunwoody =

Northern Irish cyclist

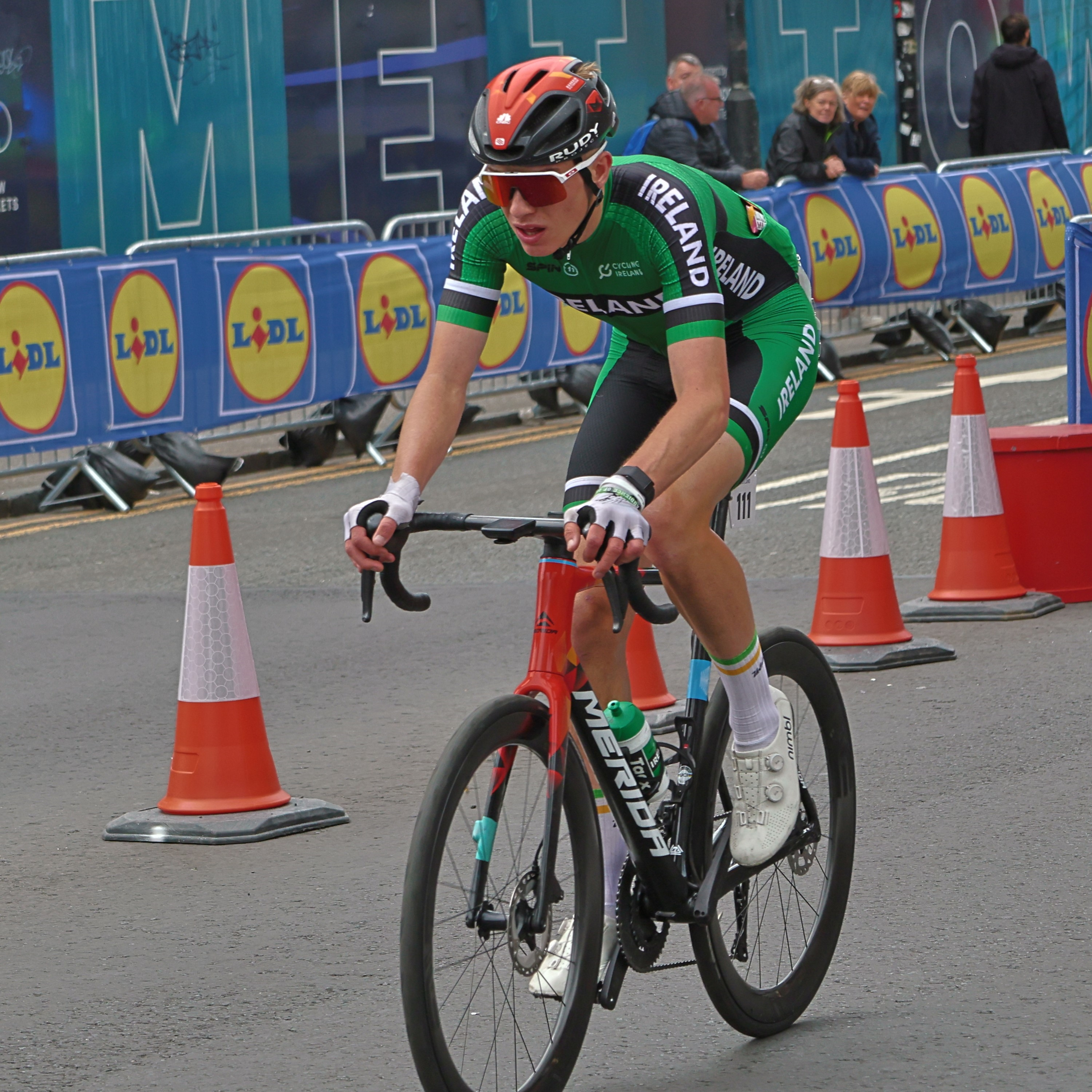
- Dunwoody at the 2023 UCI Road World Championships

Personal information
- Born: 26 May 2006 (age 20)
- Height: 1.92 m (6 ft 4 in)

Cycling career
- Sport: Cycling
- Current team: Bahrain Victorious Development Team
- Discipline: Road
- Role: Rider

Amateur teams
- 2022: Orchard CC
- 2023–2024: Cannibal–Victorious U19 Development Team

Professional team
- 2025–: Bahrain Victorious Development Team

Major wins
- One-day races and Classics National Road Race Championships (2026)
Medal record
Men's track cycling
Representing Ireland
European U23 Championships
Gold medal – first place	2026 Cottbus	Points Race

Seth Dunwoody (born 26 May 2006) is a professional road racing cyclist from Northern Ireland who rides for UCI Continental team Bahrain Victorious Development Team.

== Early life ==
He is from Hamiltonsbawn in Northern Ireland. He attended The Royal School, Armagh. He followed his father Glenn into an interest in cycle racing.

== Career ==
In 2022, he rode for the Orchard Cycling Club. He was also chosen to compete in the 2022 European Youth Summer Olympic Festival in Slovakia as part of the Ireland cycling team.

In 2023 and 2024, he rode for the Cannibal B Victorious U19 Development Team. In April 2023, he won a stage and the overall in Penn Ar Bed – Pays d’Iroise in France. In June 2023, he won the National Junior Road Race title in County Tyrone. In September 2023, he placed ninth in the 6 km stage 2 time trial in the Keizer der Juniores in Wulpen. In 2024, he finished second in Kuurne-Kuurne Juniors in Belgium and won the Ulster junior and senior titles. In September 2024, he finished fifth in the junior time trial at the 2024 UCI Road World Championships.

In October 2024, he placed first in the junior category of the Chrono des Nations. In January 2025, he signed for the Bahrain Victorious development team.

In June 2026, Dunwoody won the Irish National Cycling Championships.

== Major results ==
=== Road ===
Dunwoody leader of Mountains classification at 2025 Tour of Romania

2023
1st Road race, National Junior Championships
1st Overall Penn Ar Bed-Pays d’Iroise

1st Young rider classification
1st Stages 1 & 3

1st Noel Teggart Memorial
1st Travers Engineering Annaclone GP
5th Chrono des Nations Juniors
7th Overall Guido Reybrouck Classic

1st Young rider classification

2024
1st Chrono des Nations Juniors
1st E3 Saxo Classic Juniors
1st Travers Engineering Annaclone GP
1st Alan Towell Memorial
1st Stage 2b Course de la Paix Juniors
2nd Overall Nation's Cup Hungary

1st Stage 2b (ITT)

2nd Time trial, National Junior Championships
2nd Trofee van Vlaanderen
2nd Kuurne–Brussels–Kuurne Juniors
2nd Fokker Slag om Woensdrecht
5th Time trial, UCI World Junior Championships
5th Overall Guido Reybrouck Classic
7th Overall Trophée Centre Morbihan
2025
Tour of Romania

1st Points classification
1st Mountains classification
1st Stage 3

1st Stage 4 Giro Next Gen
1st Stage 5 Circuit des Ardennes
2nd Time trial, National Under-23 Championships
5th Road race, National Championships
2026 (1 pro win)
National Championships

1st Road race
3rd Time trial

2nd Paris–Roubaix Espoirs
2nd Gent–Wevelgem Beloften
8th Tour des 100 Communes

=== Track ===
2026
1st Points race, UEC European Under-23 Championships
