= Alberto Bruttomesso =

Italian cyclist

Personal information
- Born: 30 October 2003 (age 22) Valdagno, Italy
- Height: 1.79 m (5 ft 10 in)

Cycling career
- Sport: Cycling
- Current team: Team Bahrain Victorious
- Discipline: Road
- Role: Rider

Amateur team
- 2020–2021: Borgo Molino Rinascita Ormelle

Professional teams
- 2022: Zalf Euromobil Fior
- 2023: Cycling Team Friuli ASD
- 2024–: Team Bahrain Victorious

Alberto Bruttomesso (born 30 October 2003) is an Italian cyclist, who currently rides for UCI WorldTeam Team Bahrain Victorious.

Bruttomesso joined UCI WorldTeam Team Bahrain Victorious in 2024 after spending a year at Cycling Team Friuli ASD.

== Major results ==
2021
1st Stage 2a Giro Della Lunigiana
4th Gran Premio Eccellenze Valli del Soligo (TTT)
2022
1st Stage 1 Giro d'Italia Giovani Under 23
6th Gran Premio della Liberazione
7th Gran Premio di Poggiana
2023
1st Gran Premio Misano 100
Carpathian Couriers Race

1st Stage 1 (TTT)
1st Stage 4

2nd Memorial Polese
2nd Coppa San Geo
2nd GP Slovenian Istria
2026
10th Clàssica Comunitat Valenciana 1969
