= 2022 Mont Ventoux Dénivelé Challenge =

2022 UCI Europe Tour

Race details
- Dates: 14 June 2022
- Stages: 1
- Distance: 154 km (95.69 mi)
- Winning time: 4h 32' 35"

Results
	Winner	Ruben Guerreiro (POR)	(EF Education–EasyPost)
	Second	Esteban Chaves (COL)	(EF Education–EasyPost)
	Third	Michael Storer (AUS)	(Groupama–FDJ)

The 2022 Mont Ventoux Dénivelé Challenge was the fourth edition of the Mont Ventoux Dénivelé Challenge road cycling one-day race, which was a category 1.1 event on the 2022 UCI Europe Tour.

== Teams ==
Six UCI WorldTeams, seven UCI ProTeams, and five UCI Continental teams made up the eighteen teams that participated in the race.

UCI WorldTeams

- AG2R Citroën Team
- Astana Qazaqstan Team
- Cofidis
- Groupama–FDJ
- Movistar Team
- Trek–Segafredo

UCI ProTeams

- Arkéa–Samsic
- Burgos BH
- B&B Hotels–KTM
- Caja Rural–Seguros RGA
- Equipo Kern Pharma
- Team TotalEnergies
- Uno-X Pro Cycling Team

UCI Continental Teams

- Electro Hiper Europa–Caldas
- Go Sport–Roubaix–Lille Métropole
- Nice Métropole Côte d'Azur
- St. Michel–Auber93
- Team UC Nantes Atlantique

== Result ==
Results
Rank	Rider	Team	Time
1	Ruben Guerreiro (POR)	EF Education–EasyPost	4h 32' 35"
2	Esteban Chaves (COL)	EF Education–EasyPost	+ 53"
3	Michael Storer (AUS)	Groupama–FDJ	+ 1' 28"
4	Tobias Halland Johannessen (NOR)	Uno-X Pro Cycling Team	+ 2' 00"
5	Guillaume Martin (FRA)	Cofidis	+ 2' 15"
6	Cristián Rodríguez (FRA)	Team TotalEnergies	+ 2' 28"
7	Carlos Verona (ESP)	Movistar Team	+ 2' 30"
8	Andrey Zeits (KAZ)	Astana Qazaqstan Team	+ 2' 55"
9	Roger Adrià (ESP)	Equipo Kern Pharma	+ 3' 08"
10	Attila Valter (HUN)	Groupama–FDJ	+ 3' 14"
