= Žak Eržen =

Slovenian cyclist (born 2005)

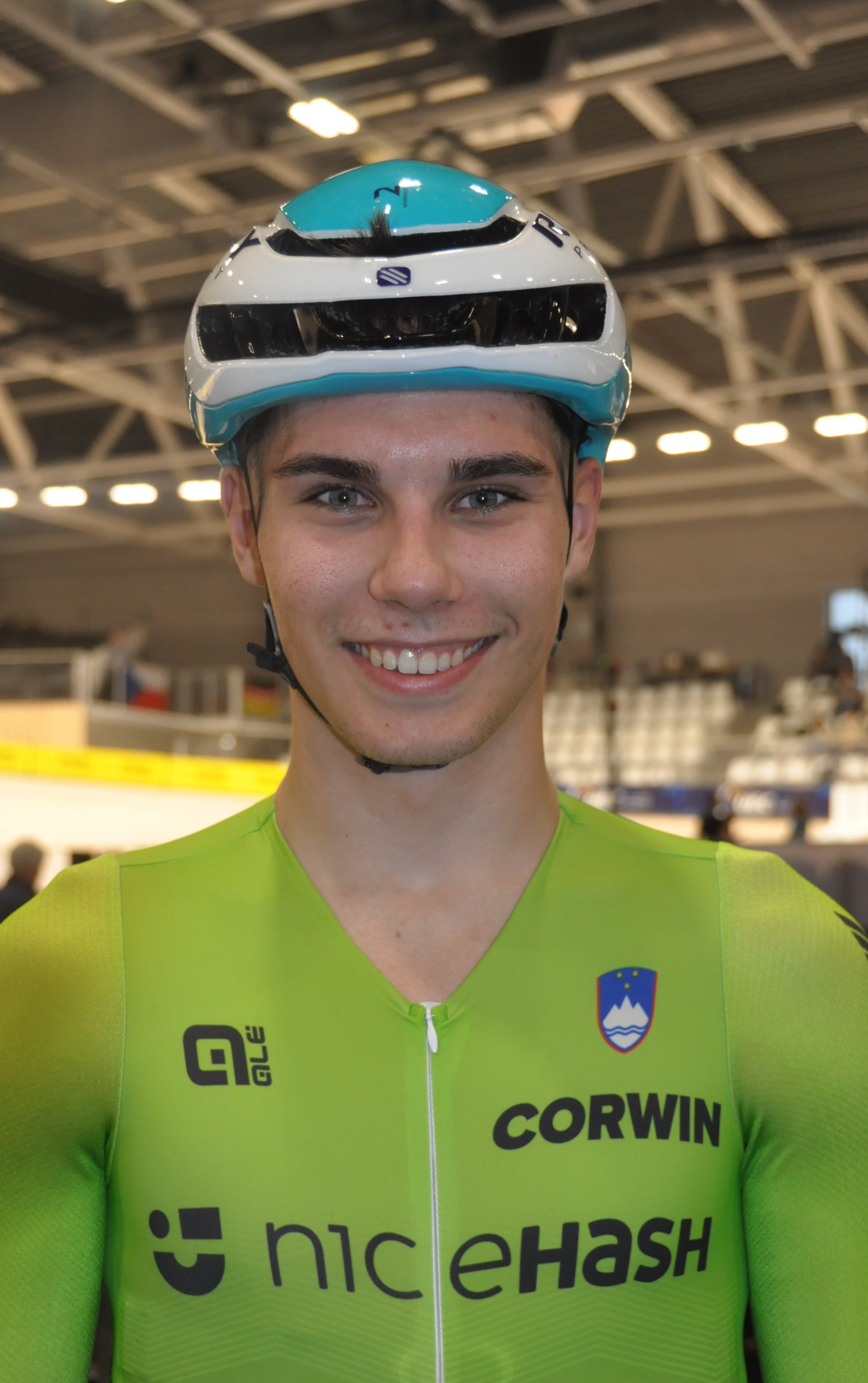
- Eržen in 2025

Personal information
- Born: 19 October 2005 (age 20)

Cycling career
- Sport: Cycling
- Current team: Team Bahrain Victorious
- Disciplines: Road; Track
- Role: Rider

Amateur team
- 2022–2023: Adria Mobil Juniores

Professional teams
- 2024: CTF Victorious
- 2025–: Team Bahrain Victorious
Medal record
Representing Slovenia
Men's road bicycle racing
European Championships
Bronze medal – third place	2023 Drenthe	Junior road race

Žak Eržen (born 19 October 2005) is a Slovenian cyclist, who currently rides for UCI WorldTeam Team Bahrain Victorious. His father Milan is the General Manager of the UCI WorldTeam Team Bahrain Victorious.

== Major results ==
=== Road ===
2022
5th Nokere Koerse Juniors
6th Gran Premio Eccellenze Valli del Soligo
9th Road race, UEC European Junior Championships
2023
National Junior Road Championships

1st Criterium
4th Road race

2nd Kuurne–Brussels–Kuurne Juniors
2nd Coppa Montes
3rd Road race, UEC European Junior Championships
3rd Overall International Alpe Adria Tour

1st Stage 3 (ITT)

3rd Nokere Koerse Juniors
5th Gran Premio Eccellenze Valli del Soligo
8th Trofeo Guido Dorigo
9th Road race, UCI World Junior Championships
9th Gran Premio Sportivi di Loria
2024
1st GP Adria Mobil
2nd GP Misano 100 Open Games
2nd Circuito di Cesa
6th GP Slovenian Istria
8th Trofeo Alessandro Bolis
9th GP De Nardi Castello Roganzuolo
2025
1st GP Adria Mobil
1st Circuito del Porto
2026
5th Scheldeprijs

=== Track ===
2022
UCI World Junior Championships

1st Elimination
3rd Scratch

3rd Elimination, UEC European Junior Championships
2023
2nd Omnium, UCI World Junior Championships
2nd Elimination, UEC European Junior Championships
