= Bahrain Victorious Development Team =

Italian cycling team

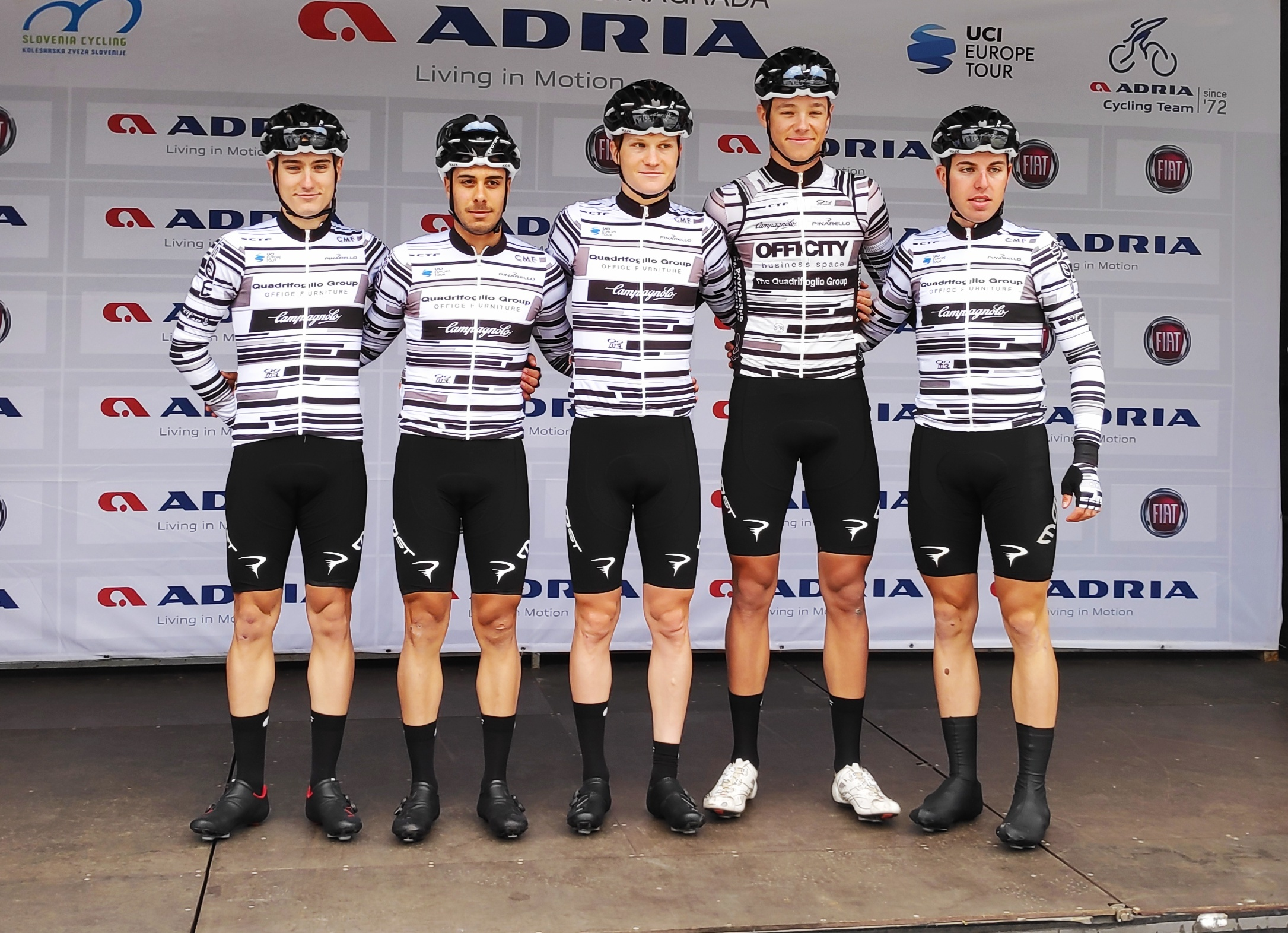

Team information
- UCI code: BVD
- Registered: Italy
- Founded: 2005
- Discipline: Road
- Status: Amateur (2005–2018); UCI Continental (2019–present)
- Website: Team home page

Key personnel
- General manager: Roberto Bressan
- Team managers: Renzo Boscolo; Fabio Baronti; Andrea Fusaz; Alessio Mattiussi

Team name history
- 2013–2019 2020–2023 2024 2025–: Cycling Team Friuli; Cycling Team Friuli ASD; CTF Victorious; Bahrain Victorious Development Team

The Bahrain Victorious Development Team (UCI code: BVD) is an Italian cycling team founded in 2005, that has been registered as a UCI Continental team since 2019. The team also owns a UCI professional team track Licence which allows it to participate to World Cup races. Since 2023, the team has acted as the development program for UCI WorldTeam Team Bahrain Victorious.

== Team roster ==
As of 22 June 2025.

| Rider | Date of birth |
|---|---|
| Elia Andreaus (ITA) | 14 April 2006 (age 20) |
| Marco Andreaus (ITA) | 25 September 2003 (age 22) |
| Santiago Basso (ITA) | 26 May 2006 (age 20) |
| Alessandro Borgo (ITA) | 6 February 2005 (age 21) |
| Kasper Borremans (FIN) | 21 August 2006 (age 20) |
| Thomas Capra (ITA) | 3 February 2005 (age 21) |
| Leonardo Consolidani (ITA) | 6 May 2006 (age 20) |
| Seth Dunwoody (IRL) | 26 May 2006 (age 20) |

| Rider | Date of birth |
|---|---|
| Nolan Huysmans (BEL) | 7 January 2006 (age 20) |
| Ahmed Madan (BHR) | 25 August 2000 (age 26) |
| Lorenzo Mottes (ITA) | 15 September 2005 (age 20) |
| Ahmed Naser (BHR) | 14 November 2000 (age 25) |
| Bryan Olivo (ITA) | 4 January 2003 (age 23) |
| Jakob Omrzel (SLO) | 21 March 2006 (age 20) |
| Yoshiki Terada (JPN) | 23 January 2002 (age 24) |

== Major results ==
2017
1st Overall Carpathian Couriers Race, Alessandro Pessot

Stage 1, Alessandro Pessot

Prologue Giro della Valle d'Aosta, Matteo Fabbro
2019
Popolarissima, Nicola Venchiarutti
Trofeo Edil C, Giovanni Aleotti
Stage 8 Giro Ciclistico d'Italia, Nicola Venchiarutti
Ruota d'Oro, Nicola Venchiarutti
2020
Italy National U23 Time Trial Championships, Jonathan Milan
Stage 5 Giro Ciclistico d'Italia, Jonathan Milan
Italy National U23 Road Race Championships, Giovanni Aleotti
2022
GP Vipava Valley & Crossborder Goriška, Fran Miholjević
Stage 3 Giro di Sicilia, Fran Miholjević
1st Overall Carpathian Couriers Race, Fran Miholjević

1st Points classification
1st Young rider classification
Prologue, Nicolò Buratti
Stage 1, Fran Miholjević

Croatia National Time Trial Championships, Fran Miholjević
Gran Premio di Poggiana, Nicolò Buratti
GP Capodarco, Nicolò Buratti
Stage 4 Giro della Regione Friuli Venezia Giulia, Nicolò Buratti
2023
Stage 1 Carpathian Couriers Race (TTT) (Note: The riders in the squad were Marco Andreaus, Giovanni Bortoluzzi, Davide De Cassan, Alberto Bruttomesso and Bryan Olivo.)
Stage 4 Carpathian Couriers Race, Alberto Bruttomesso
GP Gorenjska, Davide De Cassan
Italy National U23 Time Trial Championships, Bryan Olivo
Stage 2 Tour Alsace, Daniel Skerl
Prologue Tour of Szeklerland, Marco Andreaus
Stage 1 Tour of Szeklerland, Daniel Skerl
2024
Bahrain National Time Trial Championships, Ahmed Naser
Bahrain National Road Race Championships, Ahmed Naser
Popolarissima, Daniel Skerl
GP Adria Mobil, Žak Eržen
Stage 2 Ronde de l'Isard, Max van der Meulen
Stage 2 Ronde de l'Oise, Daniel Skerl
GP Kranj, Roman Ermakov
Ruota d'Oro, Roman Ermakov
2025
GP Adria Mobil, Žak Eržen
Gent–Wevelgem U23, Alessandro Borgo
Stage 5 Circuit des Ardennes, Seth Dunwoody
Circuito del Porto, Žak Eržen
Stage 4 Giro Next Gen, Seth Dunwoody

== National champions ==
2020
Italy U23 Time Trial, Jonathan Milan
Italy U23 Road Race, Giovanni Aleotti
2021
Croatia U23 Time Trial, Fran Miholjević
2022
Croatia Time Trial, Fran Miholjević
2023
Italy U23 Time Trial, Bryan Olivo
2024
Bahrain Time Trial, Ahmed Naser
Bahrain Road Race, Ahmed Naser
