= Daniel Skerl =

Italian cyclist

Personal information
- Born: 21 March 2003 (age 23) Trieste, Italy
- Height: 1.77 m (5 ft 10 in)

Cycling career
- Sport: Cycling
- Current team: Team Bahrain Victorious
- Discipline: Road
- Role: Rider

Amateur team
- 2021: UC Pordenone

Professional teams
- 2022–2024: CTF Victorious
- 2024: Team Bahrain Victorious (stagiaire)
- 2025–: Team Bahrain Victorious

Daniel Skerl (born 21 March 2003) is an Italian cyclist, who currently rides for UCI WorldTeam Team Bahrain Victorious.

== Major results ==
2023
1st Stage 1 Tour of Szeklerland
1st Stage 2 Tour Alsace
6th GP Slovenian Istria
2024
1st La Popolarissima
1st G.P. Misano 100 Open Games
2nd Overall Ronde de l'Oise

1st Young rider classification
1st Stage 2

4th Circuito del Porto
