= Giovanni Roman =

Polish politician

member of Sejm 2005-2007
- In office 25 September 2005 – 2007

Personal details
- Born: 4 May 1961 (age 64)
- Party: Law and Justice

Giovanni Adam Roman (born 4 May 1961 in Świdnica) is a Polish politician. He was elected to the Sejm on 25 September 2005, getting 4373 votes in 2 Wałbrzych district as a candidate from the Law and Justice list.

== See also ==
- Members of Polish Sejm 2005-2007
