= La Popolarissima =

Race details
- Date: March
- Region: Veneto
- Discipline: Road race
- Competition: UCI Europe Tour
- Type: Single day race

History
- First edition: 1919
- Editions: 109 (as of 2026)
- First winner: Antonio Dalle Fusine (ITA)
- Most wins: Aimone Altissimo (ITA); Ottavio Gabrielli (ITA); Giovanni Brotto (ITA); Annibale Brasola (ITA); Nereo Bazzan (ITA); Pietro Poloni (ITA); Elia Viviani (ITA) (2 wins)
- Most recent: Davide Persico (ITA)

La Popolarissima is a one-day cycling race held annually in Veneto, Italy. It is part of UCI Europe Tour in category 1.2.

== Winners ==
Year	Winner	Second	Third
1919 (I)	(Italy) Antonio Dalle Fusine		
1919 (II)	(Italy) Giovanni Cimetta		
1920 (I)	(Italy) Annibale Biasato		
1920 (II)	(Italy) Attilio Longhetto		
1921 (I)	(Italy) Adriano Zanaga		
1921 (II)	(Italy) Angelo Testa		
1922	(Italy) Gaetano Morbioli		
1923 (I)	(Italy) Valentino Faccin		
1923 (II)	(Italy) Livio Cattel		
1924	(Italy) Sante Camporese		
1925	(Italy) Augusto Dal Cin		
1926	(Italy) Mario Lusiani		
1927	(Italy) Aldo Canazza		
1928	(Italy) Pietro Torres		
1929	(Italy) Aimone Altissimo		
1930	(Italy) Aimone Altissimo		
1931	(Italy) Umberto Censi		
1932	(Italy) Gino Zanardo		
1933	(Italy) Giovanni Roman		
1934	(Italy) Fausto Marion		
1935	(Italy) Ottavio Gabrielli		
1936	(Italy) Ottavio Gabrielli		
1937	(Italy) Giovanni Zandona		
1938	(Italy) Giovanni Brotto		
1939	(Italy) Giovanni Brotto		
1940	(Italy) Oreste Sperandio		
1941	(Italy) Silvio Furlan		
1942	(Italy) Giovanni Pinarello		
1943	(Italy) Giovanni Bonso		
1944	No race		
1945	(Italy) Annibale Brasola		
1946	(Italy) Annibale Brasola		
1947	(Italy) Domenico De Zan		
1948	(Italy) Rinaldo Beschi		
1949	(Italy) Gino Galeazzi		
1950	(Italy) Alberto Gardo		
1951	(Italy) Lino Florean		
1952	(Italy) Lino Rossato		
1953	(Italy) Antonio Uliana		
1954	(Italy) Tenaro Codato		
1955	(Italy) Giuseppe Vanzella		
1956	No race		
1957	(Italy) Pietro Zoppas		
1958	(Italy) Dino Liviero		
1959	(Italy) Giovanni Tessarolo		
1960	(Italy) Mino Bariviera		
1961	(Italy) Rino Rossetto		
1962	(Italy) Enzo Pretolani		
1963	(Italy) Edoardo Gregori		
1964	(Italy) Luigino Friso		
1965	(Italy) Mario da Dalt		
1966	(Italy) Marino Basso		
1967	(Italy) Gianpietro Talpo		
1968	(Italy) Pietro Poloni		
1969	(Italy) Nereo Bazzan		
1970	(Italy) Nereo Bazzan		
1971	(Italy) Luigi Mazzucco		
1972	(Italy) Gianni Sartori		
1973	(Italy) Antonio Dal Bo		
1974	(Italy) Pietro Poloni		
1975	(Italy) Luciano Guidolin		
1976	(Italy) Aldo Borgato		
1977	(Italy) Adriano Brunello		
1978	(Italy) Pierangelo Bincoletto		
1979	(Italy) Giovanni Biason		
1980	(Italy) Graziano Poli		
1981	(Italy) Franco Simionati		
1982	(Italy) Giancarlo Bada		
1983	(Italy) Silvio Martinello		
1984	(Italy) Fabio Parise		
1985	(Italy) Federico Ghiotto		
1986	(Italy) Ivan Parolin		
1987	(Italy) Giovanni Strazzer		
1988	(Italy) Fabio Baldato		
1989	(Italy) Orlando Sartori		
1990	(Italy) Stefano Checchin		
1991	(Italy) Desiderio Voltarel		
1992	(Italy) Nicola Minali		
1993	(Italy) Paolo Voltolini		
1994	(Italy) Filippo Meloni		
1995	(Italy) Franco Maragno		
1996	(Italy) Gabriele Balducci		
1997	(Italy) Luca Cei		
1998	(Mexico) Miguel Ángel Meza		
1999	(Italy) Michele Sartor		
2000	(Italy) Angelo Furlan		
2001	(Ukraine) Ruslan Pidgornyy		
2002	(Italy) Francesco Chicchi		
2003	(Brazil) Murilo Fischer		
2004	(Italy) Gianluca Geremia		
2005	(Italy) Luca D'Osvaldi	(Italy) Davide Beccaro	(Lithuania) Drasutis Stundzia
2006	(Italy) Roberto Ferrari	(Italy) Oscar Gatto	(Italy) Andrea Grendene
2007	(Argentina) Mauro Abel Richeze	(Italy) Andrea Pinos	(Italy) Jacopo Guarnieri
2008	(Italy) Jacopo Guarnieri	(Italy) Andrea Piechele	(Italy) Sacha Modolo
2009	(Italy) Elia Viviani	(Italy) Andrea Menapace	(Italy) Davide Cimolai
2010	(Italy) Elia Viviani	(Italy) Giacomo Nizzolo	(Italy) Davide Gomirato
2011	(Belarus) Siarhei Papok	(Ukraine) Oleksandr Polivoda	(Italy) Andrea Fedi
2012	(Italy) Marco Benfatto	(Italy) Alberto Cecchin	(Italy) Davide Gomirato
2013	(Italy) Nicola Ruffoni	(Italy) Federico Zurlo	(Italy) Stefano Perego
2014	(Italy) Nicolas Marini	(Italy) Liam Bertazzo	(Italy) Mattia De Mori
2015	(Italy) Rino Gasparrini	(Italy) Marco Maronese	(Albania) Xhuliano Kamberaj
2016	(Italy) Riccardo Minali	(Italy) Rino Gasparrini	(Italy) Matteo Malucelli
2017	(Italy) Filippo Calderaro	(Italy) Damiano Cima	(Italy) Leonardo Bonifazio
2018	(Italy) Giovanni Lonardi	(Italy) Filippo Fortin	(Italy) Nicolas Dalla Valle
2019	(Italy) Nicola Venchiarutti	(Italy) Cristian Rocchetta	(Italy) Samuele Zambelli
2020–2021	No race		
2022	(Colombia) Nicolás David Gómez	(Italy) Francesco Della Lunga	(Italy) Matteo Baseggio
2023	(Italy) Davide Persico	(Italy) Francesco Della Lunga	(Italy) Giosuè Epis
2024	(Italy) Daniel Skerl	(Italy) Simon Buda	(Mexico) Carlos Alfonso Garcia
2025	Ivan Smirnov	(Italy) Matteo Baseggio	Lev Gonov
2026	(Italy) Davide Persico	(Italy) Thomas Capra	(Spain) Manuel Peñalver
