= Daniel Auer =

Austrian cyclist (born 1994)

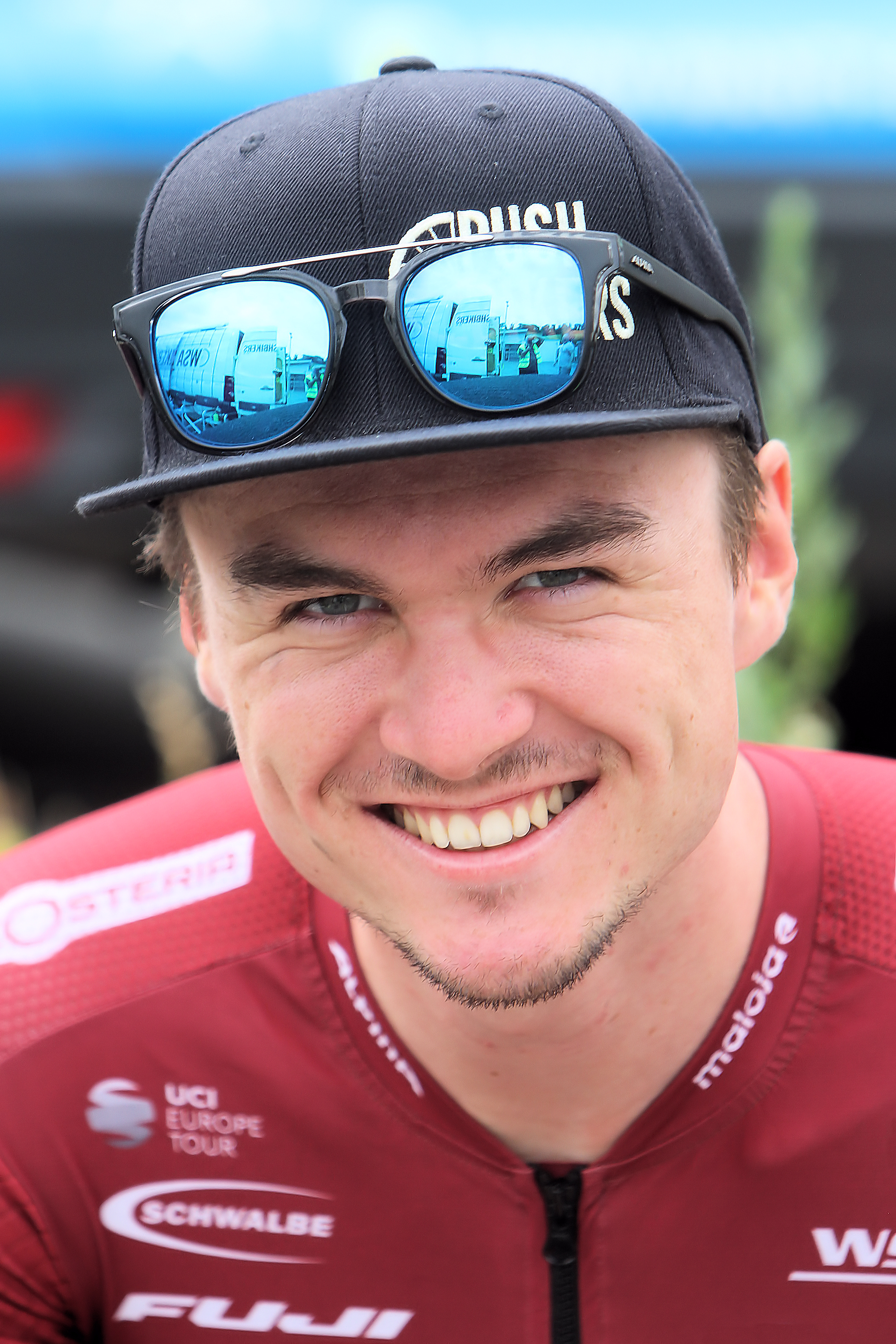
- Auer in 2019

Personal information
- Full name: Daniel Auer
- Born: 26 October 1994 (age 31) Graz, Austria
- Height: 1.83 m (6 ft 0 in)
- Weight: 71 kg (157 lb)

Cycling career
- Sport: Cycling
- Current team: Retired
- Discipline: Road
- Role: Rider

Professional teams
- 2013–2015: WSA
- 2016–2017: Team Felbermayr–Simplon Wels
- 2018–2023: WSA–Pushbikers
Medal record
Representing Austria
Men's road bicycle racing
European Games
Bronze medal – third place	2019 Minsk	Road race

Daniel Auer (born 26 October 1994) is an Austrian former cyclist, who competed as a professional from 2013 to 2023.

== Major results ==
2016
1st Stage 1 Peace Race U23
3rd Poreč Trophy
4th GP Laguna
2017
1st Stage 1 Le Triptyque des Monts et Châteaux
2018
1st GP Kranj
2nd GP Izola
7th Umag Trophy
2019
3rd Road race, European Games
2021
1st Mountains classification Belgrade–Banja Luka

1st Stage 3

1st Stage 3 Giro del Friuli-Venezia Giulia
2nd Overall Tour of Szeklerland

1st Stage 4

8th Poreč Trophy
2022
1st Umag Trophy
1st GP Slovenian Istria
