= Carpathian Couriers Race =

Polish multi-day road cycling race

Race details
- Date: April/May
- Region: Europe
- Discipline: Road race
- Competition: UCI Europe Tour
- Type: Stage race
- Web site: carpathianrace.eu

History
- First edition: 2010
- Editions: 14 (as of 2023)
- First winner: Adrian Honkisz (POL)
- Most wins: Filip Maciejuk (POL) (2 wins)
- Most recent: Gal Glivar (SLO)

The Carpathian Couriers Race is a professional cycling race held annually in Poland, the Czech Republic, Slovakia and Hungary. It is part of the UCI Europe Tour in category 2.2U, meaning it is reserved for under-23 riders. The race was known as Carpathia Couriers Path until 2012. The race was shortened to one day for the 2020 edition.

== Winners ==
Year	Country	Rider	Team
2010	Poland	Adrian Honkisz	CCC–Polsat–Polkowice
2011	Poland	Paweł Bernas	GKS Cartusia Kartuzy
2012	Netherlands	Maurits Lammertink	Cycling Team Jo Piels
2013	Netherlands	Stefan Poutsma	Cycling Team Jo Piels
2014	Austria	Gregor Mühlberger	Tirol Cycling Team
2015	Netherlands	Tim Ariesen	Cyclingteam Jo Piels
2016	New Zealand	Hamish Schreurs	Klein Constantia
2017	Italy	Alessandro Pessot	Cycling Team Friuli
2018	Poland	Filip Maciejuk	Leopard Pro Cycling
2019	Netherlands	Marijn van den Berg	Metec–TKH
2020	Netherlands	Jordan Habets	WP Groot Amsterdam
2021	Poland	Filip Maciejuk	Poland
2022	Croatia	Fran Miholjević	Cycling Team Friuli ASD
2023	Slovenia	Gal Glivar	Adria Mobil
