= Velika Nagrada Novega Mesta =

Slovenian one-day road cycling race

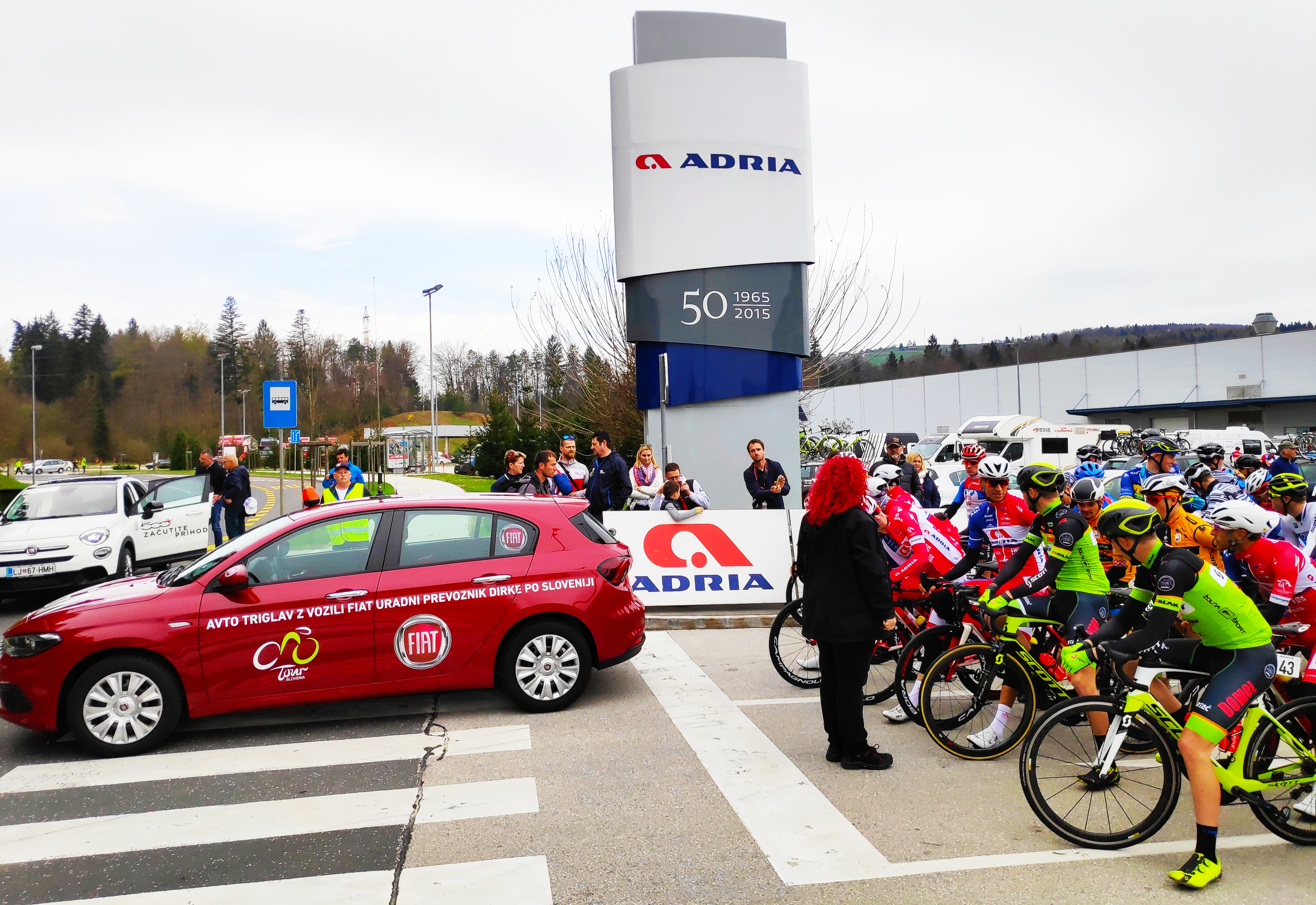
- 2019 GP Adria Mobil

Race details
- Date: Late-March; Early-April
- Discipline: Road
- Competition: UCI Europe Tour 1.2
- Type: One-day race
- Organiser: Adria Mobil (cycling team)
- Race director: Bogdan Fink

History
- First edition: 2015
- Editions: 11 (as of 2026)
- First winner: Marko Kump (SLO)
- Most wins: Filippo Fortin (ITA); Marko Kump (SLO); Žak Eržen (SLO) (2 wins)
- Most recent: Tommaso Nencini (ITA)

Velika Nagrada Novega Mesta is an annual single-day road cycling race in Slovenia. Since 2015, the race is organized as a 1.2 event on the UCI Europe Tour. Until 2024, the race was known as GP Adria Mobil, before being renamed to I feel Slovenia VN Adria Mobil in 2025 and Velika Nagrada Novega Mesta in 2026.

== Winners ==
Year	Country	Rider	Team
2015	Slovenia	Marko Kump	Adria Mobil
2016	Italy	Filippo Fortin	GM Europa Ovini
2017	Italy	Antonino Parrinello	GM Europa Ovini
2018	Italy	Filippo Fortin	Team Felbermayr–Simplon Wels
2019	Slovenia	Marko Kump	Adria Mobil
2020	No race due to coronavirus pandemic		
2021	Netherlands	Marijn van den Berg	Équipe Continentale Groupama–FDJ
2022	Poland	Maciej Paterski	Voster ATS Team
2023	Slovenia	Tilen Finkšt	Adria Mobil
2024	Slovenia	Žak Eržen	CTF Victorious
2025	Slovenia	Žak Eržen	Bahrain Victorious Development Team
2026	Italy	Tommaso Nencini	Solution Tech NIPPO Rali
