= Team Bahrain Victorious =

Cycling team founded in 2017

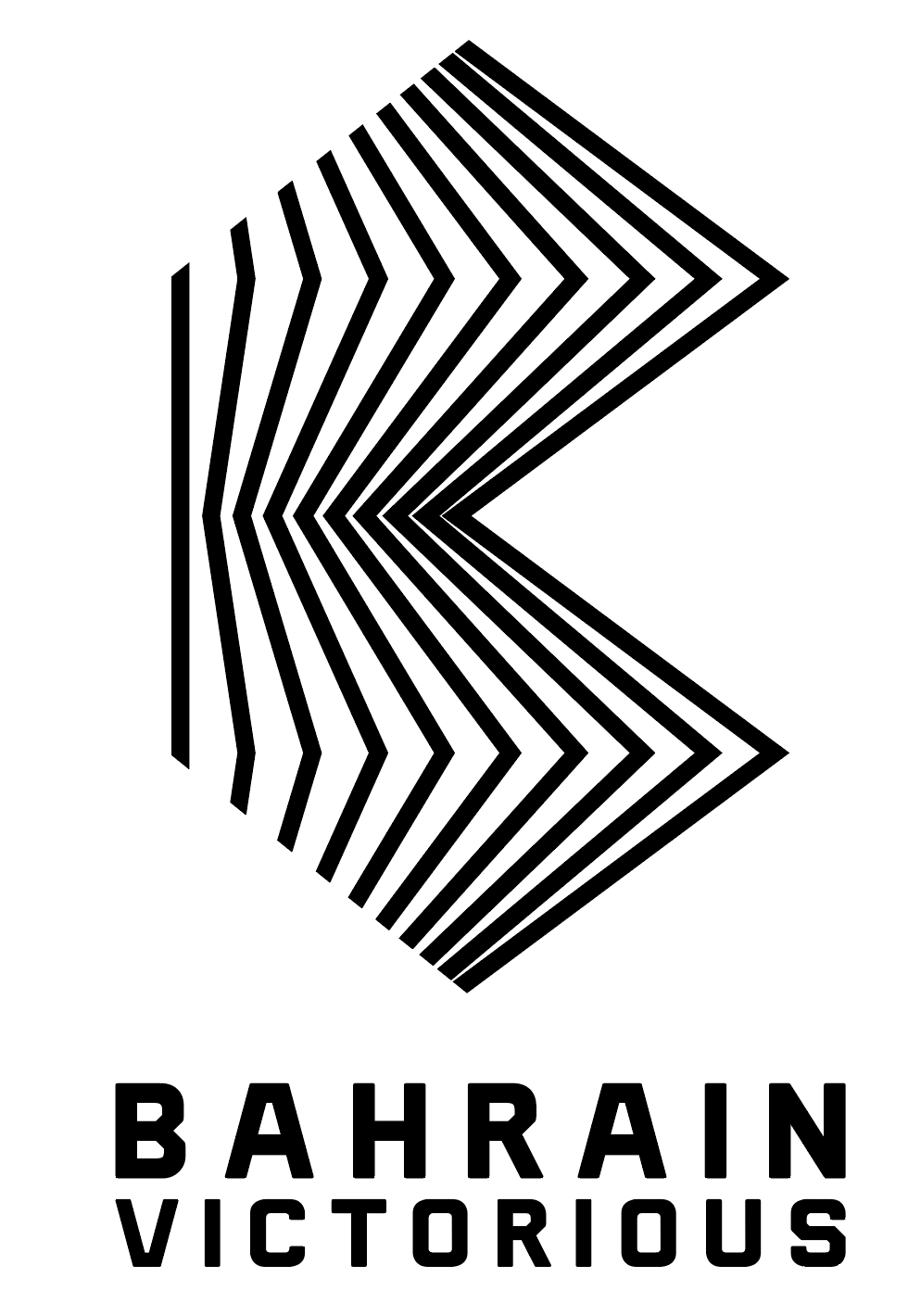

Team information
- UCI code: TBV
- Registered: Bahrain
- Founded: 2017
- Discipline: Road
- Status: UCI WorldTeam
- Bicycles: Bianchi
- Components: Shimano
- Website: Team home page

Key personnel
- General manager: Milan Eržen
- Team managers: Rod Ellingworth; Vladimir Miholjević

Team name history
2017–2019	Bahrain–Merida
2020	Bahrain–McLaren
2021–	Team Bahrain Victorious

Team Bahrain Victorious (UCI team code: TBV) is a UCI WorldTeam cycling team from Bahrain which was founded in 2017. Its title sponsor is the government of Bahrain.

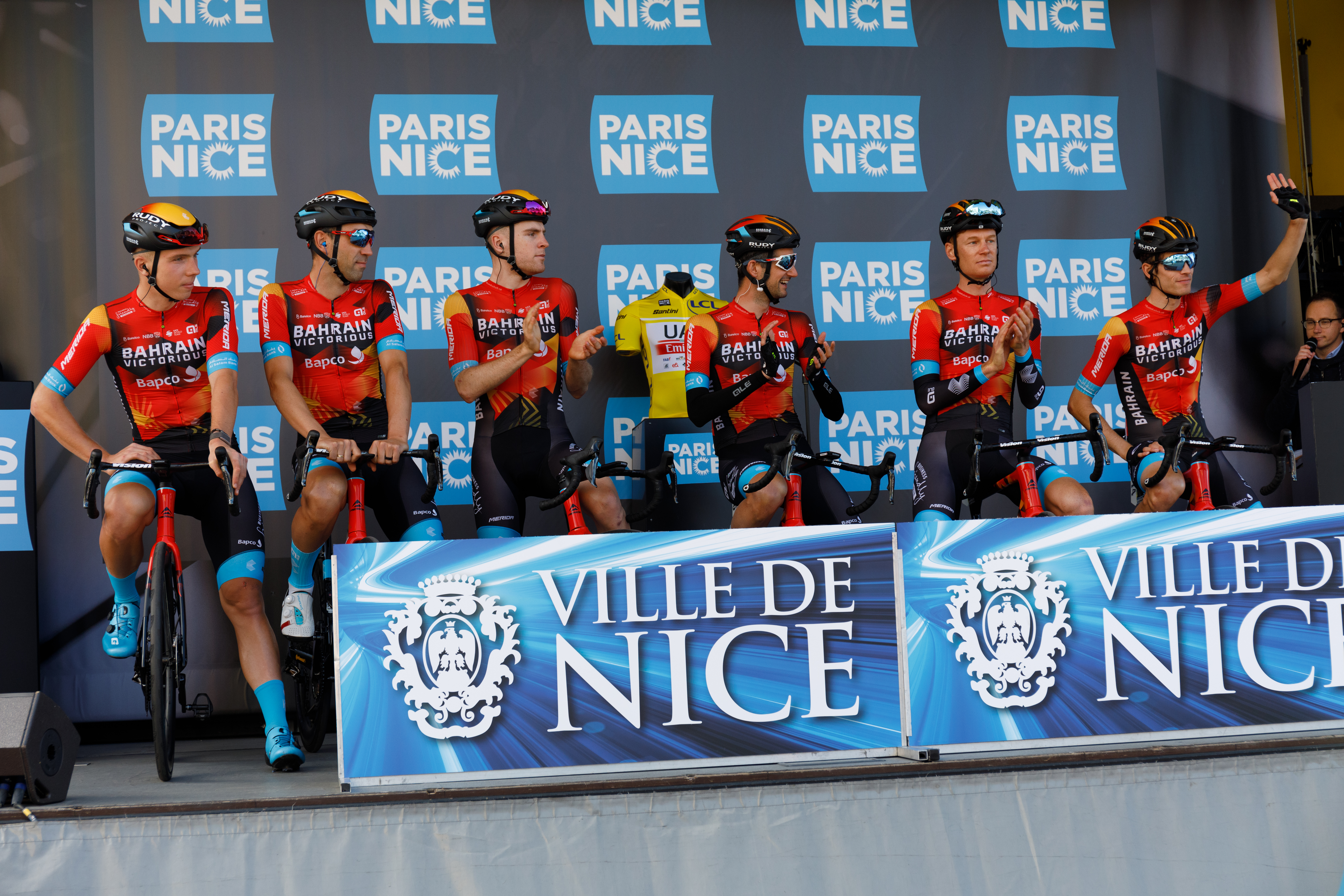
The team at the 2023 Paris–Nice

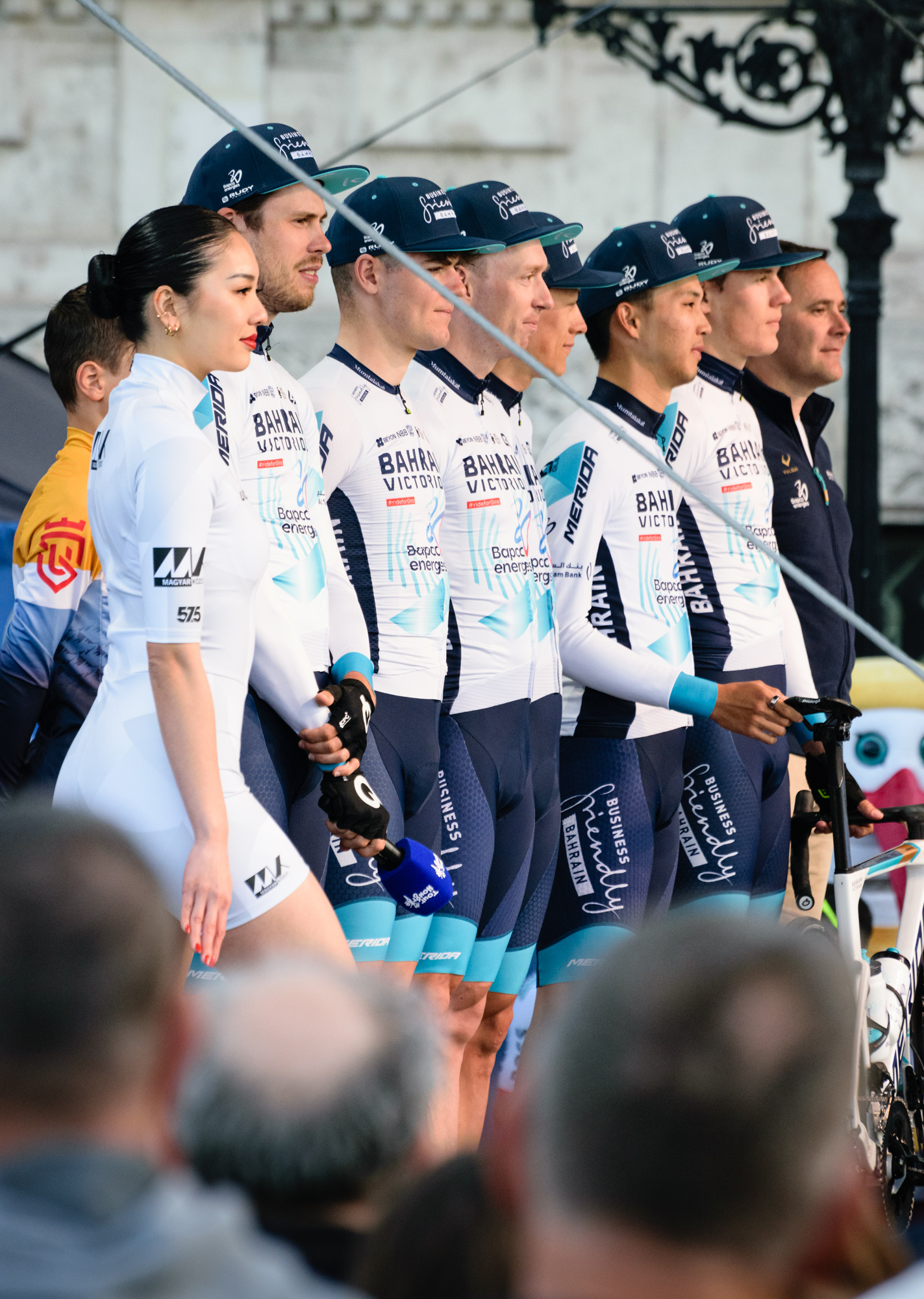
The team at the 2025 Tour de Hongrie

== History ==
The idea for a Bahrain pro cycling team was started in August 2016 by Sheikh Nasser bin Hamad Al Khalifa. The team is financed by the government of Bahrain to promote the country worldwide.

== Death of Gino Mäder ==
During the fifth stage of the Tour de Suisse on 15 June 2023, Swiss rider Gino Mäder fell in a turn when descending from the stage's highest point at Albula Pass. Mäder, 26, was found to be unconscious and submerged in water. He was resuscitated and airlifted to a hospital in Chur. Mäder died from his injuries a day later. Bahrain Victorious, along with two other teams, withdrew from the Tour on the next stage of competitive racing on 17 June 2023.

== Team roster ==
As of 25 February 2026.

Rider	Date of birth
Nikias Arndt (GER)	18 November 1991 (age 34)
Phil Bauhaus (GER)	8 July 1994 (age 32)
Pello Bilbao (ESP)	25 February 1990 (age 36)
Alessandro Borgo (ITA)	6 February 2005 (age 21)
Alberto Bruttomesso (ITA)	30 October 2003 (age 22)
Santiago Buitrago (COL)	26 September 1999 (age 27)
Damiano Caruso (ITA)	12 October 1987 (age 39)
Roman Ermakov (RUS)	6 October 2004 (age 22)
Žak Eržen (SLO)	19 October 2005 (age 21)
Afonso Eulálio (POR)	30 September 2001 (age 25)
Matevž Govekar (SLO)	17 April 2000 (age 26)
Kamil Gradek (POL)	17 September 1990 (age 36)
Rainer Kepplinger (AUT)	19 August 1997 (age 29)
Lenny Martinez (FRA)	11 July 2003 (age 23)

Rider	Date of birth
Fran Miholjević (CRO)	2 August 2002 (age 24)
Pau Miquel (ESP)	20 August 2000 (age 26)
Matej Mohorič (SLO)	19 October 1994 (age 32)
Jakob Omrzel (SLO)	21 March 2006 (age 20)
Mathijs Paasschens (NED)	18 March 1996 (age 30)
Alec Segaert (BEL)	16 January 2003 (age 23)
Daniel Skerl (ITA)	21 March 2003 (age 23)
Robert Stannard (AUS)	16 September 1998 (age 28)
Oliver Stockwell (GBR)	7 June 2002 (age 24)
Antonio Tiberi (ITA)	24 June 2001 (age 25)
Attila Valter (HUN)	12 June 1998 (age 28)
Max van der Meulen (NED)	13 January 2004 (age 22)
Vlad Van Mechelen (BEL)	2 June 2004 (age 22)
Edoardo Zambanini (ITA)	21 April 2001 (age 25)

== Doping ==
On 5 September 2018, the UCI announced that an out-of-competition test had resulted in an adverse analytical finding of erythropoietin in a sample collected 31 July 2018. Kanstantsin Sivtsov was provisionally suspended pending the result of any B sample test.

Following Stage 17 of the 2021 Tour de France, French police raided the team's hotel and bus on the suspicion of doping. The Police confirmed they conducted the raids and have the riders' training files in their possession, and "A preliminary enquiry has been opened to see if there has been, or not, acquisition, transport or possession of banned substances".

On 27 June 2022, four days before the first stage of the 2022 Tour de France, Europol raided residences of several Team Bahrain Victorious staff and riders in several countries including Slovenia, Poland, and Spain. The team stated that the raids were directly linked to the hotel searches that took place at the previous year’s Tour, while Matej Mohorič and Jan Tratnik denied that their properties had been searched.

== World, National and continental champions ==
2017
Ethiopia Time Trial, Tsgabu Grmay
2018
Spain Road Race, Gorka Izagirre
Slovenia Road Race, Matej Mohorič
2019
Taiwan Time Trial, Chun Kai Feng
Ukrainian Time Trial, Mark Padun
Slovenia Road Race, Domen Novak
2020
Spain Time Trial, Pello Bilbao
2021
Slovenia Time Trial, Jan Tratnik
Italy Road Race, Sonny Colbrelli
Slovenia Road Race, Matej Mohorič
European Road Race, Sonny Colbrelli
Taiwan Road Race, Chun Kai Feng
2022
Bahrain Road Race, Ahmed Madan
Slovenia Time Trial, Jan Tratnik
Japan Road Race, Yukiya Arashiro
Asia U23 Time Trial Ahmed Madan
2023
Croatia Time Trial, Fran Miholjević
British Road Race, Fred Wright
Serbia Road Race, Dušan Rajović
UCI World Gravel Championships, Matej Mohorič
Taiwan Time Trial, Sergio Tu
2024
Slovenia Time Trial, Matej Mohorič
