= GP Slovenian Istria =

Slovenian one-day road cycling race

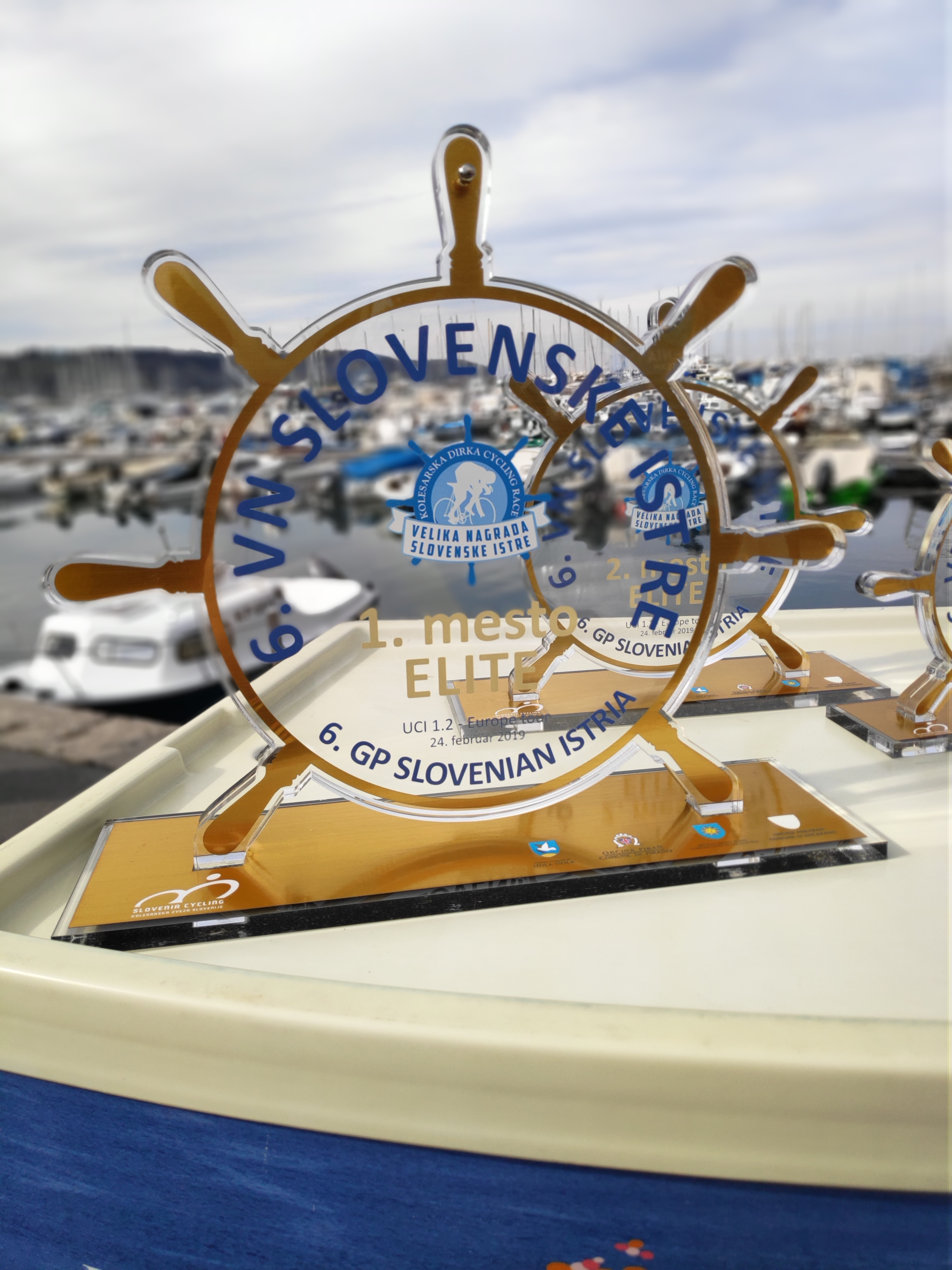

Race details
- Date: March
- Region: Slovenia
- Discipline: Road
- Type: One day race
- Web site: www.gp-slovenianistria.si

History
- First edition: 2014
- Editions: 12 (as of 2026)
- First winner: Christian Delle Stelle (ITA)
- Most wins: No repeat winners
- Most recent: Nicolò Buratti (ITA)

GP Slovenian Istria (formerly known as GP Izola) is a men's one-day cycle race that takes place in Slovenia and is rated by the UCI as 1.2 and forms part of the UCI Europe Tour.

== Winners ==
Year	Country	Rider	Team
2014	Italy	Christian Delle Stelle	Team Idea
2015	Austria	Gregor Mühlberger	Team Felbermayr–Simplon Wels
2016	Slovenia	Jure Golčer	Adria Mobil
2017	Italy	Filippo Fortin	Tirol Cycling Team
2018	Serbia	Dušan Rajović	Adria Mobil
2019	Slovenia	Marko Kump	Adria Mobil
2020	No race due to the COVID-19 pandemic		
2021	Italy	Mirco Maestri	Bardiani–CSF–Faizanè
2022	Austria	Daniel Auer	WSA KTM Graz p/b Leomo
2023	Poland	Bartłomiej Proć	Santic–Wibatech
2024	Poland	Marcin Budziński	Mazowsze Serce Polski
2025	Belgium	Michiel Coppens	BEAT CC p/b Saxo
2026	Italy	Nicolò Buratti	MBH Bank CSB Telecom Fort

== Winners per nation ==
Country	Victories
Italy	4
Slovenia	2
Austria	2
Poland	2
Serbia	1
Belgium	1
