= 2023 Presidential Tour of Turkey =

Cycling race

2023 UCI Europe Tour

Race details
- Dates: 8 – 15 October 2023
- Stages: 8
- Distance: 1,235.1 km (767.5 mi)
- Winning time: 30h 10' 14"

Results
Jersey awarded to the overall winner	Winner	Alexey Lutsenko (KAZ)	(Astana Qazaqstan Team)
	Second	Ben Zwiehoff (GER)	(Bora–Hansgrohe)
	Third	Harold Tejada (COL)	(Astana Qazaqstan Team)
Jersey awarded to the points classification winner	Points	Jasper Philipsen (BEL)	(Alpecin–Deceuninck)
Jersey awarded to the mountains classification winner	Mountains	Jay Vine (AUS)	(UAE Team Emirates)
Jersey awarded to the sprints classification winner	Sprints	Mauro Verwilt (BEL)	(Tarteletto–Isorex)
	Team	(Germany) Bora–Hansgrohe	

The 2023 Presidential Tour of Turkey was a road cycling stage race that was held between 8th and 15 October 2023 in Turkey. It was the 58th edition of the Presidential Tour of Turkey.

== Teams ==
Four UCI WorldTeams, seven UCI ProTeams, twelve UCI Continental teams, and one national team made up the 24 teams that participate in the race.

UCI WorldTeams

- Alpecin–Deceuninck
- Astana Qazaqstan Team
- Bora–Hansgrohe
- UAE Team Emirates

UCI ProTeams

- Bingoal WB
- Burgos BH
- Eolo–Kometa
- Green Project–Bardiani–CSF–Faizanè
- Q36.5 Pro Cycling Team
- Team Corratec–Selle Italia
- Team Novo Nordisk

UCI Continental Teams

- ABLOC CT
- Bike Aid
- Beykoz Belediyesi Spor Kulübü
- Global 6 Cycling
- Konya Büyükşehir Belediyespor
- P&S Benotti
- Shimano Racing
- Sofer–Savini Due–OMZ
- Spor Toto Cycling Team
- Tarteletto–Isorex
- Team Medellín–EPM
- Voster ATS Team

National Teams

- Netherlands

== Route ==
The 2023 edition includes eight stages covering 1,235.1 kilometres (767.5 mi) over eight days.

Stage characteristics and winners
Stage	Date	Course	Distance	Type	Stage winner
1	8 October	Alanya to Antalya	135 km (84 mi)	Flat stage	Jasper Philipsen (BEL)
2	9 October	Kemer to Kalkan	166.5 km (103.5 mi)	Medium-mountain stage	Jasper Philipsen (BEL)
3	10 October	Fethiye to Babadağ	104.1 km (64.7 mi)	Mountain stage	Alexey Lutsenko (KAZ)
4	11 October	Fethiye to Marmaris	165.3 km (102.7 mi)	Hilly stage	Jasper Philipsen (BEL)
5	12 October	Marmaris to Bodrum	180.6 km (112.2 mi)	Mountain stage	Nico Denz (GER)
6	13 October	Bodrum to Selçuk	193.3 km (120.1 mi)	Medium-mountain stage	Victor Langellotti (MON)
7	14 October	Selçuk to İzmir	159.8 km (99.3 mi)	Mountain stage	Jay Vine (AUS)
8	15 October	Istanbul to Istanbul (Sultanahmet)	130.5 km (81.1 mi)	Hilly stage	Jasper Philipsen (BEL)
Total			1,235.1 km (767.5 mi)		

== Stages ==
=== Stage 1 ===
8 October 2023 — Alanya to Antalya, 135 km (84 mi)

Stage 1 Result
Rank	Rider	Team	Time
1	Jasper Philipsen (BEL)	Alpecin–Deceuninck	2h 44' 31"
2	Gleb Syritsa	Astana Qazaqstan Team	+ 0"
3	Timothy Dupont (BEL)	Tarteletto–Isorex	+ 0"
4	Luca Colnaghi (ITA)	Green Project–Bardiani–CSF–Faizanè	+ 0"
5	Matteo Malucelli (ITA)	Bingoal WB	+ 0"
6	Matthew Walls (GBR)	Bora–Hansgrohe	+ 0"
7	Alexander Salby (DEN)	Bingoal WB	+ 0"
8	Giacomo Ballabio (ITA)	Global 6 Cycling	+ 0"
9	Matteo Moschetti (ITA)	Q36.5 Pro Cycling Team	+ 0"
10	Léo Bouvier (FRA)	Bike Aid	+ 0"

General classification after Stage 1
Rank	Rider	Team	Time
1	Jasper Philipsen (BEL)	Alpecin–Deceuninck	2h 44' 21"
2	Gleb Syritsa	Astana Qazaqstan Team	+ 4"
3	Timothy Dupont (BEL)	Tarteletto–Isorex	+ 6"
4	Tobias Nolde (GER)	P&S Benotti	+ 7"
5	Mateusz Konstański (POL)	Voster ATS Team	+ 8"
6	Róbigzon Oyola (COL)	Team Medellín–EPM	+ 9"
7	Luca Colnaghi (ITA)	Green Project–Bardiani–CSF–Faizanè	+ 10"
8	Matteo Malucelli (ITA)	Bingoal WB	+ 10"
9	Matthew Walls (GBR)	Bora–Hansgrohe	+ 10"
10	Alexander Salby (DEN)	Bingoal WB	+ 10"

=== Stage 2 ===
9 October 2023 — Kemer to Kalkan, 166.5 km (103.5 mi)

Stage 2 Result
Rank	Rider	Team	Time
1	Jasper Philipsen (BEL)	Alpecin–Deceuninck	4h 13' 54"
2	Cees Bol (NED)	Astana Qazaqstan Team	+ 0"
3	Luca Colnaghi (ITA)	Green Project–Bardiani–CSF–Faizanè	+ 1"
4	Antonio Angulo (ESP)	Burgos BH	+ 1"
5	Clément Alleno (FRA)	Burgos BH	+ 1"
6	Matteo Malucelli (ITA)	Bingoal WB	+ 1"
7	Attilio Viviani (ITA)	Team Corratec–Selle Italia	+ 1"
8	Matteo Moschetti (ITA)	Q36.5 Pro Cycling Team	+ 1"
9	Giovanni Lonardi (ITA)	Eolo–Kometa	+ 1"
10	Andrea Peron (ITA)	Team Novo Nordisk	+ 1"

General classification after Stage 2
Rank	Rider	Team	Time
1	Jasper Philipsen (BEL)	Alpecin–Deceuninck	6h 58' 05"
2	Cees Bol (NED)	Astana Qazaqstan Team	+ 14"
3	Luca Colnaghi (ITA)	Green Project–Bardiani–CSF–Faizanè	+ 17"
4	Timothy Dupont (BEL)	Tarteletto–Isorex	+ 20"
5	Matteo Malucelli (ITA)	Bingoal WB	+ 21"
6	Clément Alleno (FRA)	Burgos BH	+ 21"
7	Matteo Moschetti (ITA)	Q36.5 Pro Cycling Team	+ 21"
8	Attilio Viviani (ITA)	Team Corratec–Selle Italia	+ 21"
9	Antonio Angulo (ESP)	Burgos BH	+ 21"
10	Giovanni Lonardi (ITA)	Eolo–Kometa	+ 21"

=== Stage 3 ===
10 October 2023 — Fethiye to Babadağ, 104.1 km (64.7 mi)

Stage 3 Result
Rank	Rider	Team	Time
1	Alexey Lutsenko (KAZ)	Astana Qazaqstan Team	3h 34' 17"
2	Ben Zwiehoff (GER)	Bora–Hansgrohe	+ 12"
3	Harold Tejada (COL)	Astana Qazaqstan Team	+ 27"
4	Florian Lipowitz (GER)	Bora–Hansgrohe	+ 48"
5	Matteo Badilatti (SUI)	Q36.5 Pro Cycling Team	+ 55"
6	Giulio Pellizzari (ITA)	Green Project–Bardiani–CSF–Faizanè	+ 1' 24"
7	Ander Okamika (ESP)	Burgos BH	+ 3' 00"
8	Alexis Guérin (FRA)	Bingoal WB	+ 3' 28"
9	Xandro Meurisse (BEL)	Alpecin–Deceuninck	+ 3' 41"
10	Domen Novak (SLO)	UAE Team Emirates	+ 3' 44"

General classification after Stage 3
Rank	Rider	Team	Time
1	Alexey Lutsenko (KAZ)	Astana Qazaqstan Team	10h 32' 36"
2	Ben Zwiehoff (GER)	Bora–Hansgrohe	+ 16"
3	Harold Tejada (COL)	Astana Qazaqstan Team	+ 33"
4	Florian Lipowitz (GER)	Bora–Hansgrohe	+ 58"
5	Matteo Badilatti (SUI)	Q36.5 Pro Cycling Team	+ 1' 05"
6	Giulio Pellizzari (ITA)	Green Project–Bardiani–CSF–Faizanè	+ 1' 34"
7	Ander Okamika (ESP)	Burgos BH	+ 3' 10"
8	Alexis Guérin (FRA)	Bingoal WB	+ 3' 38"
9	Anton Palzer (GER)	Bora–Hansgrohe	+ 4' 14"
10	Xandro Meurisse (BEL)	Alpecin–Deceuninck	+ 4' 36"

=== Stage 4 ===
11 October 2023 — Fethiye to Marmaris, 165.3 km (102.7 mi)

Stage 4 Result
Rank	Rider	Team	Time
1	Jasper Philipsen (BEL)	Alpecin–Deceuninck	3h 50' 17"
2	Timothy Dupont (BEL)	Tarteletto–Isorex	+ 0"
3	Giovanni Lonardi (ITA)	Eolo–Kometa	+ 0"
4	Cees Bol (NED)	Astana Qazaqstan Team	+ 0"
5	Álvaro Hodeg (COL)	UAE Team Emirates	+ 0"
6	Attilio Viviani (ITA)	Team Corratec–Selle Italia	+ 0"
7	Luca Colnaghi (ITA)	Green Project–Bardiani–CSF–Faizanè	+ 0"
8	Matyáš Kopecký (CZE)	Team Novo Nordisk	+ 0"
9	Kenneth Van Rooy (BEL)	Bingoal WB	+ 0"
10	Giacomo Ballabio (ITA)	Global 6 Cycling	+ 0"

General classification after Stage 4
Rank	Rider	Team	Time
1	Alexey Lutsenko (KAZ)	Astana Qazaqstan Team	14h 22' 53"
2	Ben Zwiehoff (GER)	Bora–Hansgrohe	+ 16"
3	Harold Tejada (COL)	Astana Qazaqstan Team	+ 33"
4	Florian Lipowitz (GER)	Bora–Hansgrohe	+ 58"
5	Matteo Badilatti (SUI)	Q36.5 Pro Cycling Team	+ 1' 05"
6	Giulio Pellizzari (ITA)	Green Project–Bardiani–CSF–Faizanè	+ 1' 34"
7	Ander Okamika (ESP)	Burgos BH	+ 3' 10"
8	Alexis Guérin (FRA)	Bingoal WB	+ 3' 38"
9	Anton Palzer (GER)	Bora–Hansgrohe	+ 4' 14"
10	Xandro Meurisse (BEL)	Alpecin–Deceuninck	+ 4' 36"

=== Stage 5 ===
12 October 2023 — Marmaris to Bodrum, 180.6 km (112.2 mi)

Stage 5 Result
Rank	Rider	Team	Time
1	Nico Denz (GER)	Bora–Hansgrohe	4h 26' 27"
2	Matthew Walls (GBR)	Bora–Hansgrohe	+ 0"
3	Cees Bol (NED)	Astana Qazaqstan Team	+ 0"
4	Matteo Malucelli (ITA)	Bingoal WB	+ 0"
5	Giovanni Lonardi (ITA)	Eolo–Kometa	+ 0"
6	Luca Colnaghi (ITA)	Green Project–Bardiani–CSF–Faizanè	+ 0"
7	Ryan Gibbons (RSA)	UAE Team Emirates	+ 0"
8	Alexander Konychev (ITA)	Team Corratec–Selle Italia	+ 0"
9	Fabio Christen (SUI)	Q36.5 Pro Cycling Team	+ 0"
10	Timothy Dupont (BEL)	Tarteletto–Isorex	+ 0"

General classification after Stage 5
Rank	Rider	Team	Time
1	Alexey Lutsenko (KAZ)	Astana Qazaqstan Team	18h 49' 20"
2	Ben Zwiehoff (GER)	Bora–Hansgrohe	+ 16"
3	Harold Tejada (COL)	Astana Qazaqstan Team	+ 33"
4	Florian Lipowitz (GER)	Bora–Hansgrohe	+ 58"
5	Matteo Badilatti (SUI)	Q36.5 Pro Cycling Team	+ 1' 05"
6	Giulio Pellizzari (ITA)	Green Project–Bardiani–CSF–Faizanè	+ 1' 34"
7	Ander Okamika (ESP)	Burgos BH	+ 3' 10"
8	Alexis Guérin (FRA)	Bingoal WB	+ 3' 38"
9	Anton Palzer (GER)	Bora–Hansgrohe	+ 4' 14"
10	Xandro Meurisse (BEL)	Alpecin–Deceuninck	+ 4' 36"

=== Stage 6 ===
13 October 2023 — Bodrum to Selçuk, 193.3 km (120.1 mi)

Stage 6 Result
Rank	Rider	Team	Time
1	Victor Langellotti (MON)	Burgos BH	4h 46' 34"
2	Alexey Lutsenko (KAZ)	Astana Qazaqstan Team	+ 0"
3	Giulio Pellizzari (ITA)	Green Project–Bardiani–CSF–Faizanè	+ 1"
4	Ben Zwiehoff (GER)	Bora–Hansgrohe	+ 4"
5	Alexis Guérin (FRA)	Bingoal WB	+ 8"
6	Harold Tejada (COL)	Astana Qazaqstan Team	+ 12"
7	Domen Novak (SLO)	UAE Team Emirates	+ 18"
8	Aldemar Reyes (COL)	Team Medellín–EPM	+ 20"
9	Matteo Badilatti (SUI)	Q36.5 Pro Cycling Team	+ 20"
10	Florian Lipowitz (GER)	Bora–Hansgrohe	+ 20"

General classification after Stage 6
Rank	Rider	Team	Time
1	Alexey Lutsenko (KAZ)	Astana Qazaqstan Team	23h 35' 48"
2	Ben Zwiehoff (GER)	Bora–Hansgrohe	+ 26"
3	Harold Tejada (COL)	Astana Qazaqstan Team	+ 51"
4	Florian Lipowitz (GER)	Bora–Hansgrohe	+ 1' 24"
5	Matteo Badilatti (SUI)	Q36.5 Pro Cycling Team	+ 1' 31"
6	Giulio Pellizzari (ITA)	Green Project–Bardiani–CSF–Faizanè	+ 1' 37"
7	Ander Okamika (ESP)	Burgos BH	+ 3' 41"
8	Alexis Guérin (FRA)	Bingoal WB	+ 3' 52"
9	Xandro Meurisse (BEL)	Alpecin–Deceuninck	+ 5' 02"
10	Anton Palzer (GER)	Bora–Hansgrohe	+ 5' 16"

=== Stage 7 ===
14 October 2023 — Selçuk to İzmir, 159.8 km (99.3 mi)

Stage 7 Result
Rank	Rider	Team	Time
1	Jay Vine (AUS)	UAE Team Emirates	3h 36' 51"
2	Jasper Philipsen (BEL)	Alpecin–Deceuninck	+ 7"
3	Cees Bol (NED)	Astana Qazaqstan Team	+ 7"
4	Timothy Dupont (BEL)	Tarteletto–Isorex	+ 7"
5	Giovanni Lonardi (ITA)	Eolo–Kometa	+ 7"
6	Kenneth Van Rooy (BEL)	Bingoal WB	+ 7"
7	Andrea Peron (ITA)	Team Novo Nordisk	+ 7"
8	Attilio Viviani (ITA)	Team Corratec–Selle Italia	+ 7"
9	Mirco Maestri (ITA)	Eolo–Kometa	+ 7"
10	Clément Alleno (FRA)	Burgos BH	+ 7"

General classification after Stage 7
Rank	Rider	Team	Time
1	Alexey Lutsenko (KAZ)	Astana Qazaqstan Team	27h 12' 46"
2	Ben Zwiehoff (GER)	Bora–Hansgrohe	+ 26"
3	Harold Tejada (COL)	Astana Qazaqstan Team	+ 51"
4	Florian Lipowitz (GER)	Bora–Hansgrohe	+ 1' 24"
5	Matteo Badilatti (SUI)	Q36.5 Pro Cycling Team	+ 1' 31"
6	Giulio Pellizzari (ITA)	Green Project–Bardiani–CSF–Faizanè	+ 1' 37"
7	Ander Okamika (ESP)	Burgos BH	+ 3' 41"
8	Alexis Guérin (FRA)	Bingoal WB	+ 3' 52"
9	Xandro Meurisse (BEL)	Alpecin–Deceuninck	+ 5' 02"
10	Anton Palzer (GER)	Bora–Hansgrohe	+ 5' 16"

=== Stage 8 ===
15 October 2023 — Istanbul to Istanbul (Sultanahmet), 130.5 km (81.1 mi)

Stage 8 Result
Rank	Rider	Team	Time
1	Jasper Philipsen (BEL)	Alpecin–Deceuninck	2h 57' 28"
2	Cees Bol (NED)	Astana Qazaqstan Team	+ 0"
3	Giovanni Lonardi (ITA)	Eolo–Kometa	+ 0"
4	Matteo Malucelli (ITA)	Bingoal WB	+ 0"
5	Nico Denz (GER)	Bora–Hansgrohe	+ 0"
6	Álvaro Hodeg (COL)	UAE Team Emirates	+ 0"
7	Alexey Lutsenko (KAZ)	Astana Qazaqstan Team	+ 0"
8	Timothy Dupont (BEL)	Tarteletto–Isorex	+ 0"
9	Luca Colnaghi (ITA)	Green Project–Bardiani–CSF–Faizanè	+ 0"
10	Nikiforos Arvanitou (GRE)	Sofer–Savini Due–OMZ	+ 0"

General classification after Stage 8
Rank	Rider	Team	Time
1	Alexey Lutsenko (KAZ)	Astana Qazaqstan Team	30h 10' 14"
2	Ben Zwiehoff (GER)	Bora–Hansgrohe	+ 26"
3	Harold Tejada (COL)	Astana Qazaqstan Team	+ 51"
4	Florian Lipowitz (GER)	Bora–Hansgrohe	+ 1' 24"
5	Matteo Badilatti (SUI)	Q36.5 Pro Cycling Team	+ 1' 31"
6	Giulio Pellizzari (ITA)	Green Project–Bardiani–CSF–Faizanè	+ 1' 37"
7	Ander Okamika (ESP)	Burgos BH	+ 3' 41"
8	Alexis Guérin (FRA)	Bingoal WB	+ 3' 52"
9	Xandro Meurisse (BEL)	Alpecin–Deceuninck	+ 5' 02"
10	Anton Palzer (GER)	Bora–Hansgrohe	+ 5' 16"

== Classification leadership table ==
Classification leadership by stage
Stage	Winner	General classification	Points classification	Mountains classification	Turkish Beauties Sprints classification	Team classification
1	Jasper Philipsen	Jasper Philipsen	Jasper Philipsen	Tobias Nolde	Bram Dissel	Bingoal WB
2	Jasper Philipsen	Jasper Philipsen	Jasper Philipsen	Lennert Teugels	Wesley Mol	Burgos BH
3	Alexey Lutsenko	Alexey Lutsenko	Jasper Philipsen	Alexey Lutsenko	Róbigzon Oyola	Bora–Hansgrohe
4	Jasper Philipsen	Alexey Lutsenko	Jasper Philipsen	Alexey Lutsenko	Róbigzon Oyola	Bora–Hansgrohe
5	Nico Denz	Alexey Lutsenko	Luca Colnaghi	Alexey Lutsenko	Dawit Yemane	Bora–Hansgrohe
6	Victor Langellotti	Alexey Lutsenko	Luca Colnaghi	Alexey Lutsenko	Róbigzon Oyola	Bora–Hansgrohe
7	Jay Vine	Alexey Lutsenko	Jasper Philipsen	Jay Vine	Róbigzon Oyola	Bora–Hansgrohe
8	Jasper Philipsen	Alexey Lutsenko	Jasper Philipsen	Jay Vine	Mauro Verwilt	Bora–Hansgrohe
Final		Alexey Lutsenko	Jasper Philipsen	Jay Vine	Mauro Verwilt	Bora–Hansgrohe

== Classification standings ==
Legend
General classification	Denotes the leader of the general classification	Mountain classification	Denotes the leader of the mountains classification
Points classification	Denotes the leader of the points classification	Turkish Beauties Sprints classification	Denotes the leader of the Turkish Beauties Sprints classification

=== General classification ===
Final general classification (1–10)
Rank	Rider	Team	Time
1	Alexey Lutsenko (KAZ)	Astana Qazaqstan Team	30h 10' 14"
2	Ben Zwiehoff (GER)	Bora–Hansgrohe	+ 26"
3	Harold Tejada (COL)	Astana Qazaqstan Team	+ 51"
4	Florian Lipowitz (GER)	Bora–Hansgrohe	+ 1' 24"
5	Matteo Badilatti (SUI)	Q36.5 Pro Cycling Team	+ 1' 31"
6	Giulio Pellizzari (ITA)	Green Project–Bardiani–CSF–Faizanè	+ 1' 37"
7	Ander Okamika (ESP)	Burgos BH	+ 3' 41"
8	Alexis Guérin (FRA)	Bingoal WB	+ 3' 52"
9	Xandro Meurisse (BEL)	Alpecin–Deceuninck	+ 5' 02"
10	Anton Palzer (GER)	Bora–Hansgrohe	+ 5' 16"

=== Points classification ===
Final points classification (1–10)
Rank	Rider	Team	Points
1	Jasper Philipsen (BEL)	Alpecin–Deceuninck	77
2	Cees Bol (NED)	Astana Qazaqstan Team	71
3	Giovanni Lonardi (ITA)	Eolo–Kometa	55
4	Luca Colnaghi (ITA)	Green Project–Bardiani–CSF–Faizanè	55
5	Timothy Dupont (BEL)	Tarteletto–Isorex	53
6	Alexey Lutsenko (KAZ)	Astana Qazaqstan Team	47
7	Matteo Malucelli (ITA)	Bingoal WB	45
8	Matthew Walls (GBR)	Bora–Hansgrohe	34
9	Attilio Viviani (ITA)	Team Corratec–Selle Italia	32
10	Nico Denz (GER)	Bora–Hansgrohe	27

=== Mountains classification ===
Final mountains classification (1–10)
Rank	Rider	Team	Points
1	Jay Vine (AUS)	UAE Team Emirates	29
2	Alexey Lutsenko (KAZ)	Astana Qazaqstan Team	23
3	Róbigzon Oyola (COL)	Team Medellín–EPM	16
4	Ben Zwiehoff (GER)	Bora–Hansgrohe	16
5	Victor Langellotti (MON)	Burgos BH	10
6	Dawit Yemane (ERI)	Bike Aid	10
7	Harold Tejada (COL)	Astana Qazaqstan Team	9
8	Giulio Pellizzari (ITA)	Green Project–Bardiani–CSF–Faizanè	7
9	Alessio Martinelli (ITA)	Green Project–Bardiani–CSF–Faizanè	7
10	Oliver Mattheis (GER)	Bike Aid	7

=== Turkish Beauties Sprints classification ===
Turkish Beauties Sprints classification after stage 8 (1–10)
Rank	Rider	Team	Points
1	Mauro Verwilt (BEL)	Tarteletto–Isorex	10
2	Róbigzon Oyola (COL)	Team Medellín–EPM	8
3	Nico Denz (GER)	Bora–Hansgrohe	8
4	Tobias Nolde (GER)	P&S Benotti	6
5	Dawit Yemane (ERI)	Bike Aid	5
6	Wesley Mol (NED)	Bike Aid	5
7	Feritcan Şamlı (TUR)	Spor Toto Cycling Team	5
8	Bram Dissel (NED)	Netherlands	5
9	Lennert Teugels (BEL)	Bingoal WB	3
10	Gianni Marchand (BEL)	Tarteletto–Isorex	3

=== Team classification ===
Final team classification (1–10)
Rank	Team	Time
1	(Germany) Bora–Hansgrohe	90h 37' 54"
2	(Italy) Green Project–Bardiani–CSF–Faizanè	+ 14' 15"
3	(Spain) Burgos BH	+ 15' 02"
4	(Switzerland) Q36.5 Pro Cycling Team	+ 15' 16"
5	(Italy) Eolo–Kometa	+ 19' 36"
6	(Kazakhstan) Astana Qazaqstan Team	+ 35' 11"
7	(Belgium) Bingoal WB	+ 39' 39"
8	(Colombia) Team Medellín–EPM	+ 55' 25"
9	(United Arab Emirates) UAE Team Emirates	+ 1h 01' 27"
10	(Germany) Bike Aid	+ 1h 01' 30"
