= 2021 Trek–Segafredo (men's team) season =

Trek–Segafredo
- 2021 season
- UCI code: TFS
- Status: UCI WorldTeam
- World Tour Rank: 12th
- Manager: Luca Guercilena (ITA)
- Main sponsor(s): Trek Bicycle Corporation; Massimo Zanetti Beverage Group
- Based: United States
- Bicycles: Trek
- Groupset: Sram

Season victories
- One-day races: 5
- Stage race overall: 3
- Stage race stages: 8
- National Championships: 4
- Most wins: Bauke Mollema (NED); Mads Pedersen (DEN); (4 each)
- Best ranked rider: Jasper Stuyven (BEL) (17th)
- Jersey

The 2021 Trek–Segafredo season was the team's 11th season overall, of which all of them have been at UCI WorldTeam level, and the 6th season under the current name.

== Team roster ==
As of August 1, 2021.

Rider	Date of birth
Filippo Baroncini (Note: Baroncini, Hellemose, and Hoole joined as stagiaires on August 1 from Team Colpack–Ballan, VC Mendrisio, and SEG Racing Academy, respectively.) (ITA)	26 August 2000 (aged 20)
Julien Bernard (FRA)	17 March 1992 (aged 28)
Gianluca Brambilla (ITA)	22 August 1987 (aged 33)
Giulio Ciccone (ITA)	20 December 1994 (aged 26)
Nicola Conci (ITA)	5 January 1997 (aged 23)
Koen de Kort (NED)	8 September 1982 (aged 38)
Niklas Eg (DEN)	6 January 1995 (aged 25)
Jakob Egholm (DEN)	27 April 1998 (aged 22)
Kenny Elissonde (FRA)	21 July 1991 (aged 29)
Amanuel Ghebreigzabhier (ERI)	17 August 1994 (aged 26)
Asbjørn Hellemose (DEN)	15 January 1999 (aged 21)
Daan Hoole (NED)	22 February 1999 (aged 21)
Alexander Kamp (DEN)	14 December 1993 (aged 27)
Alex Kirsch (LUX)	12 June 1992 (aged 28)
Emīls Liepiņš (LAT)	29 October 1992 (aged 28)
Juan Pedro López (ESP)	31 July 1997 (aged 23)

Rider	Date of birth
Bauke Mollema (NED)	26 November 1986 (aged 34)
Jacopo Mosca (ITA)	29 August 1993 (aged 27)
Matteo Moschetti (ITA)	14 August 1996 (aged 24)
Ryan Mullen (IRL)	7 August 1994 (aged 26)
Antonio Nibali (ITA)	23 September 1992 (aged 28)
Vincenzo Nibali (ITA)	14 November 1984 (aged 36)
Mads Pedersen (DEN)	18 December 1995 (aged 25)
Charlie Quarterman (GBR)	6 September 1998 (aged 22)
Kiel Reijnen (USA)	1 June 1986 (aged 34)
Michel Ries (LUX)	11 March 1998 (aged 22)
Quinn Simmons (USA)	8 May 2001 (aged 19)
Mattias Skjelmose Jensen (DEN)	26 September 2000 (aged 20)
Toms Skujiņš (LAT)	15 June 1991 (aged 29)
Jasper Stuyven (BEL)	17 April 1992 (aged 28)
Edward Theuns (BEL)	30 April 1991 (aged 29)
Antonio Tiberi (ITA)	24 June 2001 (aged 19)

Riders who joined the team for the 2021 season

Rider	2020 team
Jakob Egholm	neo-pro (Hagens Berman Axeon)
Amanuel Ghebreigzabhier	NTT Pro Cycling
Mattias Skjelmose Jensen	neo-pro (Leopard Pro Cycling)
Antonio Tiberi	neo-pro (Team Colpack–Ballan)

Riders who left the team during or after the 2020 season

Rider	2021 team
Will Clarke	Retired
Richie Porte	INEOS Grenadiers
Pieter Weening	Retired

== Season victories ==
Date	Race	Competition	Rider	Country	Location	Ref.
February 19	Tour des Alpes-Maritimes et du Var, Stage 1	UCI Europe Tour	Bauke Mollema (NED)	France	Gourdon	
February 21	Tour des Alpes-Maritimes et du Var, Stage 3	UCI Europe Tour	Gianluca Brambilla (ITA)	France	Blausasc	
February 21	Tour des Alpes-Maritimes et du Var, Overall	UCI Europe Tour	Gianluca Brambilla (ITA)	France		
February 21	Tour des Alpes-Maritimes et du Var, Points classification	UCI Europe Tour	Bauke Mollema (NED)	France		
February 28	Kuurne–Brussels–Kuurne	UCI Europe Tour; UCI ProSeries	Mads Pedersen (DEN)	Belgium	Kuurne	
March 3	Trofeo Laigueglia	UCI Europe Tour; UCI ProSeries	Bauke Mollema (NED)	Italy	Laigueglia	
March 20	Milan–San Remo	UCI World Tour	Jasper Stuyven (BEL)	Italy	Sanremo	
March 21	Per sempre Alfredo	UCI Europe Tour	Matteo Moschetti (ITA)	Italy	Sesto Fiorentino	
May 16	Tour de Hongrie, Stage 5	UCI Europe Tour	Edward Theuns (BEL)	Hungary	Budapest	
July 10	Tour de France, Stage 14	UCI World Tour	Bauke Mollema (NED)	France	Quillan	
July 22	Tour de Wallonie, Stage 3	UCI Europe Tour; UCI ProSeries	Quinn Simmons (USA)	Belgium	Érezée	
July 23	Criterium d'Après Tour de Dijon	UCI Europe Tour	Julien Bernard (FRA)	France	Dijon	
July 24	Tour de Wallonie, Overall	UCI Europe Tour; UCI ProSeries	Quinn Simmons (USA)	Belgium		
July 24	Tour de Wallonie, Young rider classification	UCI Europe Tour; UCI ProSeries	Quinn Simmons (USA)	Belgium		
July 24	Tour de Wallonie, Team classification	UCI Europe Tour; UCI ProSeries	(Note: The riders in the squad were Gianluca Brambilla, Jakob Egholm, Alex Kirsch, Juan Pedro López, Antonio Nibali, Kiel Reijnen, and Quinn Simmons.)	Belgium		
August 11	Danmark Rundt, Stage 2	UCI Europe Tour; UCI ProSeries	Mads Pedersen (DEN)	Denmark	Sønderborg	
August 14	Danmark Rundt, Points classification	UCI Europe Tour; UCI ProSeries	Mads Pedersen (DEN)	Denmark		
August 14	Danmark Rundt, Team classification	UCI Europe Tour; UCI ProSeries	(Note: The riders in the squad were Julien Bernard, Jakob Egholm, Alexander Kamp, Matteo Moschetti, Mads Pedersen, Michel Ries, and Mattias Skjelmose Jensen.)	Denmark		
August 21	Tour of Norway, Stage 3	UCI Europe Tour; UCI ProSeries	Mads Pedersen (DEN)	Norway	Jørpeland	
August 22	Tour of Norway, Young rider classification	UCI Europe Tour; UCI ProSeries	Mattias Skjelmose Jensen (DEN)	Norway		
October 1	Giro di Sicilia, Stage 4	UCI Europe Tour	Vincenzo Nibali (ITA)	Italy	Mascali	
October 1	Giro di Sicilia, Overall	UCI Europe Tour	Vincenzo Nibali (ITA)	Italy		
October 1	Giro di Sicilia, Team classification	UCI Europe Tour	(Note: The riders in the squad were Niklas Eg, Asbjorn Hellemose, Jacopo Mosca, Matteo Moschetti, Antonio Nibali, Vincenzo Nibali, and Mattias Skjelmose Jensen.)	Italy		

== National, Continental, and World Champions ==
Date	Discipline	Jersey	Rider	Country	Location	Ref.
June 16	Latvian National Time Trial Championships		Toms Skujiņš (LAT)	Latvia	Riga	
June 20	Latvian National Road Race Championships		Toms Skujiņš (LAT)	Estonia (Note: The Estonian, Latvian, and Lithuanian national road race championships were held together as one event, the Baltic Road Championships. The best placed rider from each country was deemed their respective country's national champion.)	Valga	
September 30	Irish National Time Trial Championships		Ryan Mullen (IRL)	Ireland	County Wicklow	
October 3	Irish National Road Race Championships		Ryan Mullen (IRL)	Ireland	County Wicklow	
