= 2022 Giro di Sicilia =

2022 UCI Europe Tour

Race details
- Dates: 12 – 15 April 2022
- Stages: 4
- Distance: 662 km (411 mi)
- Winning time: 17h 03' 09"

Results
Jersey awarded to the overall winner	Winner	Damiano Caruso (ITA)	(Italy)
	Second	Jefferson Alexander Cepeda (ECU)	(Drone Hopper–Androni Giocattoli)
	Third	Louis Meintjes (RSA)	(Intermarché–Wanty–Gobert Matériaux)
Jersey awarded to the points classification winner	Points	Damiano Caruso (ITA)	(Italy)
Jersey awarded to the mountains classification winner	Mountains	Stefano Gandin (ITA)	(Team Corratec)
Jersey awarded to the youth classification winner	Youth	Jefferson Alexander Cepeda (ECU)	(Drone Hopper–Androni Giocattoli)
	Team	Astana Qazaqstan Team	

The 2022 Giro di Sicilia (known as Il Giro di Sicilia EOLO for sponsorship reasons) was the 26th edition of the Giro di Sicilia road cycling stage race and the third edition since its revival in 2019.

== Teams ==
Three of the 19 UCI WorldTeams, four UCI ProTeams, eleven UCI Continental teams and one national team made up the 19 teams that participated in the race. Trek–Segafredo, EF Education–Nippo Development Team, Zalf Euromobil Fior and Bardiani–CSF–Faizanè, with six riders each, were the only teams to not enter a full squad of seven riders. 129 riders started the race, of which 91 finished.

UCI WorldTeams

- Astana Qazaqstan Team
- Intermarché–Wanty–Gobert Matériaux
- Trek–Segafredo

UCI ProTeams

- Bardiani–CSF–Faizanè
- Drone Hopper–Androni Giocattoli
- Eolo–Kometa
- Human Powered Health

UCI Continental Teams

- Biesse–Carrera
- Colombia Tierra de Atletas–GW Shimano
- Cycling Team Friuli ASD
- D'Amico–UM Tools
- EF Education–Nippo Development Team
- Giotti Victoria–Savini Due
- MG.K Vis Colors for Peace VPM
- Team Corratec
- Team Qhubeka
- Work Service–Vitalcare–Vega
- Zalf Euromobil Fior

National Team

- Italy

== Route ==
Stage characteristics and winners
Stage	Date	Route	Distance	Type	Winner
1	12 April	Milazzo to Bagheria	199 km (124 mi)	Flat stage	Matteo Malucelli (ITA)
2	13 April	Palma di Montechiaro to Caltanissetta	152 km (94 mi)	Hilly stage	Damiano Caruso (ITA)
3	14 April	Realmonte to Piazza Armerina	171 km (106 mi)	Hilly stage	Fran Miholjević (CRO)
4	15 April	Ragalna to Mount Etna	140 km (87 mi)	Mountain stage	Damiano Caruso (ITA)
Total			712 km (442 mi)		

== Stages ==
=== Stage 1 ===
12 April 2022— Milazzo to Bagheria, 199 km (124 mi)

Stage 1 Result
Rank	Rider	Team	Time
1	Matteo Malucelli (ITA)	Italy	4h 21' 36"
2	Matteo Moschetti (ITA)	Trek–Segafredo	+ 0"
3	Filippo Fiorelli (ITA)	Bardiani–CSF–Faizanè	+ 0"
4	Alessandro Fedeli (ITA)	Italy	+ 0"
5	Damiano Caruso (ITA)	Italy	+ 0"
6	David Martín (ESP)	Eolo–Kometa	+ 0"
7	Gerben Thijssen (BEL)	Intermarché–Wanty–Gobert Matériaux	+ 0"
8	Pier-André Coté (CAN)	Human Powered Health	+ 0"
9	Carloalberto Giordani (ITA)	Biesse–Carrera	+ 0"
10	Nicola Venchiarutti (ITA)	Work Service–Vitalcare–Vega	+ 0"

General classification after Stage 1
Rank	Rider	Team	Time
1	Matteo Malucelli (ITA)	Italy	4h 21' 36"
2	Matteo Moschetti (ITA)	Trek–Segafredo	+ 0"
3	Filippo Fiorelli (ITA)	Bardiani–CSF–Faizanè	+ 0"
4	Alejandro Ropero (ESP)	Eolo–Kometa	+ 0"
5	Michael Belleri (ITA)	Biesse–Carrera	+ 0"
6	Alessandro Fedeli (ITA)	Italy	+ 0"
7	Damiano Caruso (ITA)	Italy	+ 0"
8	David Martín (ESP)	Eolo–Kometa	+ 0"
9	Gerben Thijssen (BEL)	Intermarché–Wanty–Gobert Matériaux	+ 0"
10	Pier-André Coté (CAN)	Human Powered Health	+ 0"

=== Stage 2 ===
13 April 2022 — Palma di Montechiaro to Caltanissetta, 152 km (94 mi)

Stage 2 Result
Rank	Rider	Team	Time
1	Damiano Caruso (ITA)	Italy	3h 45' 18"
2	Vincenzo Nibali (ITA)	Astana Qazaqstan Team	+ 0"
3	Domenico Pozzovivo (ITA)	Intermarché–Wanty–Gobert Matériaux	+ 0"
4	Kenny Elissonde (FRA)	Trek–Segafredo	+ 0"
5	Alessandro Fedeli (ITA)	Italy'	+ 3"
6	Vincenzo Albanese (ITA)	Eolo–Kometa	+ 3"
7	Nicola Conci (ITA)	Italy	+ 3"
8	Filippo Fiorelli (ITA)	Bardiani–CSF–Faizanè	+ 3"
9	Jefferson Alexander Cepeda (ECU)	Drone Hopper–Androni Giocattoli	+ 3"
10	Edgar Andrés Pinzon (COL)	Colombia Tierra de Atletas–GW Shimano	+ 3"

General classification after Stage 2
Rank	Rider	Team	Time
1	Damiano Caruso (ITA)	Italy	8h 06' 54"
2	Vincenzo Nibali (ITA)	Astana Qazaqstan Team	+ 5"
3	Domenico Pozzovivo (ITA)	Intermarché–Wanty–Gobert Matériaux	+ 6"
4	Filippo Fiorelli (ITA)	Bardiani–CSF–Faizanè	+ 9"
5	Kenny Elissonde (FRA)	Trek–Segafredo	+ 10"
6	Alessandro Fedeli (ITA)	Italy	+ 13"
7	Nicola Conci (ITA)	Italy	+ 13"
8	Jefferson Alexander Cepeda (ECU)	Drone Hopper–Androni Giocattoli	+ 13"
9	Edgar Andrés Pinzon (COL)	Colombia Tierra de Atletas–GW Shimano	+ 13"
10	Vincenzo Albanese (ITA)	Eolo–Kometa	+ 13"

=== Stage 3 ===
14 April 2022 — Realmonte to Piazza Armerina, 171 km (106 mi)

Stage 3 Result
Rank	Rider	Team	Time
1	Fran Miholjević (CRO)	Cycling Team Friuli ASD	4h 54' 07"
2	Pier-André Coté (CAN)	Human Powered Health	+ 41"
3	Filippo Fiorelli (ITA)	Bardiani–CSF–Faizanè	+ 41"
4	Nicola Venchiarutti (ITA)	Work Service–Vitalcare–Vega	+ 41"
5	Vincenzo Albanese (ITA)	Eolo–Kometa	+ 41"
6	Vincenzo Nibali (ITA)	Astana Qazaqstan Team	+ 41"
7	Jacopo Mosca (ITA)	Trek–Segafredo	+ 41"
8	Valerio Conti (ITA)	Astana Qazaqstan Team	+ 41"
9	Georg Zimmermann (GER)	Intermarché–Wanty–Gobert Matériaux	+ 41"
10	Alessandro Fedeli (ITA)	Italy	+ 41"

General classification after Stage 3
Rank	Rider	Team	Time
1	Fran Miholjević (CRO)	Cycling Team Friuli ASD	13h 01' 14"
2	Damiano Caruso (ITA)	Italy	+18"
3	Vincenzo Nibali (ITA)	Astana Qazaqstan Team	+ 22"
4	Filippo Fiorelli (ITA)	Bardiani–CSF–Faizanè	+ 23"
5	Domenico Pozzovivo (ITA)	Intermarché–Wanty–Gobert Matériaux	+ 24"
6	Kenny Elissonde (FRA)	Trek–Segafredo	+ 28"
7	Alessandro Fedeli (ITA)	Italy	+ 31"
8	Nicola Conci (ITA)	Italy	+ 31"
9	Jefferson Alexander Cepeda (ECU)	Drone Hopper–Androni Giocattoli	+ 31"
10	Edgar Andrés Pinzon (COL)	Colombia Tierra de Atletas–GW Shimano	+ 31"

=== Stage 4 ===
15 April 2022 — Ragalna to Mount Etna, 140 km (87 mi)

Stage 4 Result
Rank	Rider	Team	Time
1	Damiano Caruso (ITA)	Italy	4h 01' 47"
2	Louis Meintjes (RSA)	Intermarché–Wanty–Gobert Matériaux	+ 5"
3	Jefferson Alexander Cepeda (ECU)	Drone Hopper–Androni Giocattoli	+ 10"
4	Vincenzo Nibali (ITA)	Astana Qazaqstan Team	+ 17"
5	Diego Rosa (ITA)	Eolo–Kometa	+ 50"
6	Kenny Elissonde (FRA)	Trek–Segafredo	+ 57"
7	Nicola Conci (ITA)	Italy	+ 2' 06"
8	Vincenzo Albanese (ITA)	Eolo–Kometa	+ 2' 18"
9	Antonio Nibali (ITA)	Astana Qazaqstan Team	+ 2' 20"
10	Luca Rastelli (ITA)	Bardiani–CSF–Faizanè	+ 2' 22"

General classification after Stage 4
Rank	Rider	Team	Time
1	Damiano Caruso (ITA)	Italy	17h 03' 09"
2	Jefferson Alexander Cepeda (ECU)	Drone Hopper–Androni Giocattoli	+ 29"
3	Louis Meintjes (RSA)	Intermarché–Wanty–Gobert Matériaux	+ 29"
4	Vincenzo Nibali (ITA)	Astana Qazaqstan Team	+ 31"
5	Kenny Elissonde (FRA)	Trek–Segafredo	+ 1' 17"
6	Nicola Conci (ITA)	Italy	+ 2' 29"
7	Vincenzo Albanese (ITA)	Eolo–Kometa	+ 2' 41"
8	Edgar Andrés Pinzon (COL)	Colombia Tierra de Atletas–GW Shimano	+ 2' 45"
9	Andrey Zeits (KAZ)	Astana Qazaqstan Team	+ 2' 52"
10	Antonio Nibali (ITA)	Astana Qazaqstan Team	+ 2' 57"

== Classification leadership table ==
Classification leadership by stage
Stage	Winner	General classification	Points classification	Mountains classification	Young rider classification	Team classification
1	Matteo Malucelli	Matteo Malucelli	Matteo Malucelli	Stefano Gandin	Alejandro Ropero	Italy
2	Damiano Caruso	Damiano Caruso	Damiano Caruso	Stefano Gandin	Nicola Conci	Italy
3	Fran Miholjević	Fran Miholjević	Filippo Fiorelli	Stefano Gandin	Fran Miholjević	Italy
4	Damiano Caruso	Damiano Caruso	Damiano Caruso	Stefano Gandin	Jefferson Alexander Cepeda	Astana Qazaqstan Team
Final		Damiano Caruso	Damiano Caruso	Stefano Gandin	Jefferson Alexander Cepeda	Astana Qazaqstan Team

== Final classification standings ==
Legend
Denotes the leader of the general classification	Denotes the leader of the mountains classification
Denotes the leader of the points classification	Denotes the leader of the young rider classification

=== General classification ===
Final general classification (1–10)
Rank	Rider	Team	Time
1	Damiano Caruso (ITA)	Italy	17h 03' 09"
2	Jefferson Alexander Cepeda (ECU)	Drone Hopper–Androni Giocattoli	+ 29"
3	Louis Meintjes (RSA)	Intermarché–Wanty–Gobert Matériaux	+ 29"
4	Vincenzo Nibali (ITA)	Astana Qazaqstan Team	+ 31"
5	Kenny Elissonde (FRA)	Trek–Segafredo	+ 1' 17"
6	Nicola Conci (ITA)	Italy	+ 2' 29"
7	Vincenzo Albanese (ITA)	Eolo–Kometa	+ 2' 41"
8	Edgar Andrés Pinzon (COL)	Colombia Tierra de Atletas–GW Shimano	+ 2' 45"
9	Andrey Zeits (KAZ)	Astana Qazaqstan Team	+ 2' 52""
10	Antonio Nibali (ITA)	Astana Qazaqstan Team	+ 2' 57"

=== Points classification ===
Final points classification (1–10)
Rank	Rider	Team	Points
1	Damiano Caruso (ITA)	Italy	30
2	Filippo Fiorelli (ITA)	Bardiani–CSF–Faizanè	24
3	Vincenzo Nibali (ITA)	Astana Qazaqstan Team	22
4	Fran Miholjević (CRO)	Cycling Team Friuli ASD	15
5	Vincenzo Albanese (ITA)	Eolo–Kometa	14
6	Alessandro Fedeli (ITA)	Italy	14
7	Pier-André Coté (CAN)	Human Powered Health	13
8	Matteo Malucelli (ITA)	Italy	12
9	Kenny Elissonde (FRA)	Trek–Segafredo	12
10	Nicola Venchiarutti (ITA)	Work Service–Vitalcare–Vega	11

=== Mountains classification ===
Final mountains classification (1–10)
Rank	Rider	Team	Points
1	Stefano Gandin (ITA)	Team Corratec	34
2	Damiano Caruso (ITA)	Italy	25
3	Germán Darío Gómez (COL)	Colombia Tierra de Atletas–GW Shimano	23
4	Pier-André Coté (CAN)	Human Powered Health	20
5	Louis Meintjes (RSA)	Intermarché–Wanty–Gobert Matériaux	17
6	Rafael Pineda (COL)	Colombia Tierra de Atletas–GW Shimano	15
7	Nicola Venchiarutti (ITA)	Work Service–Vitalcare–Vega	14
8	Jefferson Alexander Cepeda (ECU)	Drone Hopper–Androni Giocattoli	12
9	Vincenzo Nibali (ITA)	Astana Qazaqstan Team	10
10	Matteo Zurlo (ITA)	Zalf Euromobil Fior	10

=== Young rider classification ===
Final young rider classification (1–10)
Rank	Rider	Team	Time
1	Jefferson Alexander Cepeda (ECU)	Drone Hopper–Androni Giocattoli	17h 03' 38"
2	Nicola Conci (ITA)	Italy	+ 2' 00"
3	Edgar Andrés Pinzon (COL)	Colombia Tierra de Atletas–GW Shimano	+ 2' 16"
4	Simone Raccani (ITA)	Zalf Euromobil Fior	+ 2' 34"
5	Luca Rastelli (ITA)	Bardiani–CSF–Faizanè	+ 3' 32"
6	Georg Zimmermann (GER)	Intermarché–Wanty–Gobert Matériaux	+ 4' 26"
7	Fran Miholjević (CRO)	Cycling Team Friuli ASD	+ 7' 09"
8	Christian Scaroni (ITA)	Italy	+ 8' 18"
9	Cristian David Rico (COL)	Colombia Tierra de Atletas–GW Shimano	+ 8' 42"
10	Germán Darío Gómez (COL)	Colombia Tierra de Atletas–GW Shimano	+ 8' 49"

=== Team classification ===
Final team classification (1–10)
Rank	Team	Time
1	Astana Qazaqstan Team	51h 15' 53"
2	Italy	+ 23"
3	Intermarché–Wanty–Gobert Matériaux	+ 3' 48"
4	Eolo–Kometa	+ 3' 57"
5	Drone Hopper–Androni Giocattoli	+ 6' 43"
6	Bardiani–CSF–Faizanè	+ 11' 46"
7	Colombia Tierra de Atletas–GW Shimano	+ 12' 05"
8	Cycling Team Friuli ASD	+ 28' 41"
9	Work Service–Vitalcare–Vega	+ 37' 42"
10	Zalf Euromobil Fior	+ 38' 17"
