= 2025 Tour of Magnificent Qinghai =

Chinese cycling race

2025 UCI ProSeries

Race details
- Dates: 6–13 July 2025
- Stages: 8
- Distance: 1,323.7 km (822.5 mi)
- Winning time: 30h 05' 13"

Results
Jersey awarded to the overall winner	Winner	Henok Mulubrhan (ERI)	(XDS Astana Team)
	Second	Guillermo Thomas Silva (URU)	(Caja Rural–Seguros RGA)
	Third	Harold Martín López (ECU)	(XDS Astana Team)
Jersey awarded to the points classification winner	Points	Henok Mulubrhan (ERI)	(XDS Astana Team)
Jersey awarded to the mountains classification winner	Mountains	Jon Agirre (ESP)	(Euskaltel–Euskadi)
	Team	(Kazakhstan) XDS Astana Team	

The 2025 Tour of Magnificent Qinghai was a road cycling stage race that took place between 6 and 13 July 2025 in China. The race was rated as a category 2.Pro event on the 2025 UCI ProSeries calendar, and was the 24th edition of the Tour of Magnificent Qinghai.

== Teams ==
One UCI WorldTeam, eight UCI ProTeams, and thirteen UCI Continental teams made up the 22 teams that participated in the race.

UCI WorldTeams

- XDS Astana Team

UCI ProTeams

- Burgos Burpellet BH
- Caja Rural–Seguros RGA
- Equipo Kern Pharma
- Euskaltel–Euskadi
- Team Polti VisitMalta
- Team Solution Tech–Vini Fantini
- Unibet Tietema Rockets
- VF Group–Bardiani–CSF–Faizanè

UCI Continental Teams

- Bodywrap LTwoo Cycling Team
- CCACHE x BODYWRAP
- Chengdu DYC Cycling Team
- China Anta–Mentech Cycling Team
- Factor Racing
- FNIX–SCOM–Hengxiang Cycling Team
- Huansheng–Vonoa–Taishan Sport Cycling Team
- Istanbul Büyükșehir Belediye Spor Türkiye
- Li-Ning Star
- Petrolike
- Quick Pro Team
- Tianyoude Hotel Cycling Team
- Terengganu Cycling Team

== Route ==
Stage characteristics and winners
Stage	Date	Course	Distance	Type	Stage winner
1	6 July	Xining to Xining	120.6 km (74.9 mi)	Flat stage	Manuel Peñalver (ESP)
2	7 July	Duoba to Huzhu	151.4 km (94.1 mi)	Intermediate stage	Guillermo Thomas Silva (URU)
3	8 July	Huzhu to Menyuan	219.5 km (136.4 mi)	Intermediate stage	Alexander Salby (DEN)
4	9 July	Menyuan to Qilian	172.5 km (107.2 mi)	Hilly stage	Martin Laas (EST)
5	10 July	Qilian to Gangcha	168.7 km (104.8 mi)	Intermediate stage	Carlos Alfonso García (MEX)
6	11 July	Gangcha to Gonghe	232.7 km (144.6 mi)	Hilly stage	Henok Mulubrhan (ERI)
7	12 July	Gonghe to Haiyan	137 km (85 mi)	Hilly stage	Petr Rikunov
8	13 July	Xihaizhen to Xihaizhen	121.3 km (75.4 mi)	Hilly stage	Alexander Salby (DEN)
Total			1,323.7 km (822.5 mi)		

== Stages ==
=== Stage 1 ===
6 July 2025 — Xining to Xining, 120.6 km (74.9 mi)

Stage 1 Result
Rank	Rider	Team	Time
1	Manuel Peñalver (ESP)	Team Polti VisitMalta	2h 31' 37"
2	Eduard-Michael Grosu (ROM)	Huansheng–Vonoa–Taishan Sport Cycling Team	+ 0"
3	Alexander Salby (DEN)	Li-Ning Star	+ 0"
4	Miguel Ángel Fernández (ESP)	Equipo Kern Pharma	+ 0"
5	Cristian David Pita (ECU)	Huansheng–Vonoa–Taishan Sport Cycling Team	+ 0"
6	Attilio Viviani (ITA)	Team Solution Tech–Vini Fantini	+ 0"
7	Francisco Joel Peñuela (VEN)	Caja Rural–Seguros RGA	+ 0"
8	José Antonio Prieto (MEX)	Petrolike	+ 0"
9	Cesar Macias (MEX)	Petrolike	+ 0"
10	Henok Mulubrhan (ERI)	XDS Astana Team	+ 0"

General classification after Stage 1
Rank	Rider	Team	Time
1	Manuel Peñalver (ESP)	Team Polti VisitMalta	2h 31' 27"
2	Nejc Komac (SLO)	Factor Racing	+ 3"
3	Eduard-Michael Grosu (ROM)	Huansheng–Vonoa–Taishan Sport Cycling Team	+ 4"
4	Timofei Ivanov	Chengdu DYC Cycling Team	+ 4"
5	Alexander Salby (DEN)	Li-Ning Star	+ 6"
6	Hasan Seyfollahifard (IRN)	Tianyoude Hotel Cycling Team	+ 7"
7	Vadim Pronskiy (KAZ)	Terengganu Cycling Team	+ 8"
8	Miguel Ángel Fernández (ESP)	Equipo Kern Pharma	+ 10"
9	Cristian David Pita (ECU)	Huansheng–Vonoa–Taishan Sport Cycling Team	+ 10"
10	Attilio Viviani (ITA)	Team Solution Tech–Vini Fantini	+ 10"

=== Stage 2 ===
7 July 2025 — Duoba to Huzhu, 151.4 km (94.1 mi)

Stage 2 Result
Rank	Rider	Team	Time
1	Guillermo Thomas Silva (URU)	Caja Rural–Seguros RGA	3h 36' 05"
2	Jonathan Klever Caicedo (ECU)	Petrolike	+ 0"
3	Henok Mulubrhan (ERI)	XDS Astana Team	+ 2"
4	Fernando Barceló (ESP)	Caja Rural–Seguros RGA	+ 2"
5	Javier Serrano (ESP)	Team Polti VisitMalta	+ 2"
6	Giovanni Carboni (ITA)	Unibet Tietema Rockets	+ 2"
7	Lucas De Rossi (FRA)	China Anta–Mentech Cycling Team	+ 2"
8	Antonio Jesús Soto (ESP)	Equipo Kern Pharma	+ 2"
9	Ludovico Crescioli (ITA)	Team Polti VisitMalta	+ 2"
10	Iván Cobo (ESP)	Equipo Kern Pharma	+ 2"

General classification after Stage 2
Rank	Rider	Team	Time
1	Guillermo Thomas Silva (URU)	Caja Rural–Seguros RGA	6h 07' 31"
2	Jonathan Klever Caicedo (ECU)	Petrolike	+ 5"
3	Henok Mulubrhan (ERI)	XDS Astana Team	+ 9"
4	Zeb Kyffin (GBR)	Unibet Tietema Rockets	+ 13"
5	Javier Serrano (ESP)	Team Polti VisitMalta	+ 13"
6	Henrique da Silva Avancini (BRA)	Factor Racing	+ 13"
7	Antonio Jesús Soto (ESP)	Equipo Kern Pharma	+ 13"
8	Giovanni Carboni (ITA)	Unibet Tietema Rockets	+ 13"
9	Ludovico Crescioli (ITA)	Team Polti VisitMalta	+ 13"
10	Clément Alleno (FRA)	Burgos Burpellet BH	+ 13"

=== Stage 3 ===
8 July 2025 — Huzhu to Menyuan, 219.5 km (136.4 mi)

Stage 3 Result
Rank	Rider	Team	Time
1	Alexander Salby (DEN)	Li-Ning Star	5h 31' 53"
2	Manuel Peñalver (ESP)	Team Polti VisitMalta	+ 0"
3	Cameron Scott (AUS)	CCACHE x BODYWRAP	+ 0"
4	Miguel Ángel Fernández (ESP)	Equipo Kern Pharma	+ 0"
5	Luca Colnaghi (ITA)	VF Group–Bardiani–CSF–Faizanè	+ 0"
6	Wang Kuicheng (CHN)	Bodywrap LTwoo Cycling Team	+ 0"
7	Guillermo Thomas Silva (URU)	Caja Rural–Seguros RGA	+ 0"
8	Luke Mudgway (NZL)	Li-Ning Star	+ 0"
9	Yevgeniy Gidich (KAZ)	China Anta–Mentech Cycling Team	+ 0"
10	Javier Serrano (ESP)	Team Polti VisitMalta	+ 0"

General classification after Stage 3
Rank	Rider	Team	Time
1	Guillermo Thomas Silva (URU)	Caja Rural–Seguros RGA	11h 39' 23"
2	Jonathan Klever Caicedo (ECU)	Petrolike	+ 6"
3	Henok Mulubrhan (ERI)	XDS Astana Team	+ 10"
4	Davide Baldaccini (ITA)	Team Solution Tech–Vini Fantini	+ 11"
5	Javier Serrano (ESP)	Team Polti VisitMalta	+ 14"
6	Henrique da Silva Avancini (BRA)	Factor Racing	+ 14"
7	Giovanni Carboni (ITA)	Unibet Tietema Rockets	+ 14"
8	Antonio Jesús Soto (ESP)	Equipo Kern Pharma	+ 14"
9	Clément Alleno (FRA)	Burgos Burpellet BH	+ 14"
10	Zeb Kyffin (GBR)	Unibet Tietema Rockets	+ 14"

=== Stage 4 ===
9 July 2025 — Menyuan to Qilian, 172.5 km (107.2 mi)

Stage 4 Result
Rank	Rider	Team	Time
1	Martin Laas (EST)	Quick Pro Team	3h 43' 18"
2	Alexander Salby (DEN)	Li-Ning Star	+ 0"
3	Enrico Zanoncello (ITA)	VF Group–Bardiani–CSF–Faizanè	+ 0"
4	Petr Rikunov	Chengdu DYC Cycling Team	+ 0"
5	Martijn Budding (NED)	Unibet Tietema Rockets	+ 0"
6	Cameron Scott (AUS)	CCACHE x BODYWRAP	+ 0"
7	Manuel Peñalver (ESP)	Team Polti VisitMalta	+ 0"
8	Attilio Viviani (ITA)	Team Solution Tech–Vini Fantini	+ 0"
9	Guillermo Thomas Silva (URU)	Caja Rural–Seguros RGA	+ 0"
10	Aaron Gate (NZL)	XDS Astana Team	+ 0"

General classification after Stage 4
Rank	Rider	Team	Time
1	Guillermo Thomas Silva (URU)	Caja Rural–Seguros RGA	15h 22' 41"
2	Jonathan Klever Caicedo (ECU)	Petrolike	+ 6"
3	Cedrik Bakke Christophersen (NOR)	Unibet Tietema Rockets	+ 9"
4	Henok Mulubrhan (ERI)	XDS Astana Team	+ 10"
5	Clément Alleno (FRA)	Burgos Burpellet BH	+ 11"
6	Davide Baldaccini (ITA)	Team Solution Tech–Vini Fantini	+ 11"
7	Diego Uriarte (ESP)	Equipo Kern Pharma	+ 12"
8	Javier Serrano (ESP)	Team Polti VisitMalta	+ 14"
9	Antonio Jesús Soto (ESP)	Equipo Kern Pharma	+ 14"
10	Henrique da Silva Avancini (BRA)	Factor Racing	+ 14"

=== Stage 5 ===
10 July 2025 — Qilian to Gangcha, 168.7 km (104.8 mi)

Stage 5 Result
Rank	Rider	Team	Time
1	Carlos Alfonso García (MEX)	Petrolike	4h 13' 06"
2	Henok Mulubrhan (ERI)	XDS Astana Team	+ 0"
3	Guillermo Thomas Silva (URU)	Caja Rural–Seguros RGA	+ 0"
4	Aaron Gate (NZL)	XDS Astana Team	+ 0"
5	Petr Rikunov	Chengdu DYC Cycling Team	+ 0"
6	Even Yemane (ERI)	Istanbul Büyükșehir Belediye Spor Türkiye	+ 0"
7	Rodrigo Álvarez (ESP)	Burgos Burpellet BH	+ 0"
8	Jambaljamts Sainbayar (MGL)	Burgos Burpellet BH	+ 0"
9	Antonio Jesús Soto (ESP)	Equipo Kern Pharma	+ 0"
10	Vadim Pronskiy (KAZ)	Terengganu Cycling Team	+ 0"

General classification after Stage 5
Rank	Rider	Team	Time
1	Guillermo Thomas Silva (URU)	Caja Rural–Seguros RGA	19h 35' 43"
2	Henok Mulubrhan (ERI)	XDS Astana Team	+ 8"
3	Jonathan Klever Caicedo (ECU)	Petrolike	+ 10"
4	Cedrik Bakke Christophersen (NOR)	Unibet Tietema Rockets	+ 13"
5	Clément Alleno (FRA)	Burgos Burpellet BH	+ 15"
6	Davide Baldaccini (ITA)	Team Solution Tech–Vini Fantini	+ 15"
7	Fernando Barceló (ESP)	Caja Rural–Seguros RGA	+ 16"
8	Diego Uriarte (ESP)	Equipo Kern Pharma	+ 16"
9	Harold Martín López (ECU)	XDS Astana Team	+ 17"
10	Javier Serrano (ESP)	Team Polti VisitMalta	+ 18"

=== Stage 6 ===
11 July 2025 — Gangcha to Gonghe, 232.7 km (144.6 mi)

Stage 6 Result
Rank	Rider	Team	Time
1	Henok Mulubrhan (ERI)	XDS Astana Team	4h 59' 56"
2	Guillermo Thomas Silva (URU)	Caja Rural–Seguros RGA	+ 0"
3	Harold Martín López (ECU)	XDS Astana Team	+ 0"
4	Jon Agirre (ESP)	Euskaltel–Euskadi	+ 0"
5	Edison Alejandro Callejas (COL)	Petrolike	+ 0"
6	Alex Tolio (ITA)	VF Group–Bardiani–CSF–Faizanè	+ 0"
7	Jokin Murguialday (ESP)	Euskaltel–Euskadi	+ 3"
8	Petr Rikunov	Chengdu DYC Cycling Team	+ 15"
9	Santiago Umba (COL)	XDS Astana Team	+ 15"
10	Clément Alleno (FRA)	Burgos Burpellet BH	+ 15"

General classification after Stage 6
Rank	Rider	Team	Time
1	Guillermo Thomas Silva (URU)	Caja Rural–Seguros RGA	24h 35' 33"
2	Henok Mulubrhan (ERI)	XDS Astana Team	+ 4"
3	Harold Martín López (ECU)	XDS Astana Team	+ 19"
4	Jon Agirre (ESP)	Euskaltel–Euskadi	+ 24"
5	Edison Alejandro Callejas (COL)	Petrolike	+ 24"
6	Alex Tolio (ITA)	VF Group–Bardiani–CSF–Faizanè	+ 24"
7	Jonathan Klever Caicedo (ECU)	Petrolike	+ 31"
8	Clément Alleno (FRA)	Burgos Burpellet BH	+ 36"
9	Antonio Jesús Soto (ESP)	Equipo Kern Pharma	+ 39"
10	Ludovico Crescioli (ITA)	Team Polti VisitMalta	+ 39"

=== Stage 7 ===
12 July 2025 — Gonghe to Haiyan, 137 km (85 mi)

Stage 7 Result
Rank	Rider	Team	Time
1	Petr Rikunov	Chengdu DYC Cycling Team	3h 04' 46"
2	Enrico Zanoncello (ITA)	VF Group–Bardiani–CSF–Faizanè	+ 0"
3	Henok Mulubrhan (ERI)	XDS Astana Team	+ 0"
4	Aaron Gate (NZL)	XDS Astana Team	+ 0"
5	Eduard-Michael Grosu (ROM)	Huansheng–Vonoa–Taishan Sport Cycling Team	+ 0"
6	Javier Serrano (ESP)	Team Polti VisitMalta	+ 0"
7	Guillermo Thomas Silva (URU)	Caja Rural–Seguros RGA	+ 0"
8	Miguel Ángel Fernández (ESP)	Equipo Kern Pharma	+ 0"
9	Vadim Pronskiy (KAZ)	Terengganu Cycling Team	+ 0"
10	Ludovico Crescioli (ITA)	Team Polti VisitMalta	+ 0"

General classification after Stage 7
Rank	Rider	Team	Time
1	Henok Mulubrhan (ERI)	XDS Astana Team	27h 40' 18"
2	Guillermo Thomas Silva (URU)	Caja Rural–Seguros RGA	+ 1"
3	Harold Martín López (ECU)	XDS Astana Team	+ 20"
4	Edison Alejandro Callejas (COL)	Petrolike	+ 23"
5	Jon Agirre (ESP)	Euskaltel–Euskadi	+ 25"
6	Alex Tolio (ITA)	VF Group–Bardiani–CSF–Faizanè	+ 25"
7	Jonathan Klever Caicedo (ECU)	Petrolike	+ 32"
8	Clément Alleno (FRA)	Burgos Burpellet BH	+ 34"
9	Antonio Jesús Soto (ESP)	Equipo Kern Pharma	+ 40"
10	Ludovico Crescioli (ITA)	Team Polti VisitMalta	+ 40"

=== Stage 8 ===
13 July 2025 — Menyuan to Menyuan, 121.3 km (75.4 mi)

Stage 8 Result
Rank	Rider	Team	Time
1	Alexander Salby (DEN)	Li-Ning Star	2h 24' 57"
2	Manuel Peñalver (ESP)	Team Polti VisitMalta	+ 0"
3	Aaron Gate (NZL)	XDS Astana Team	+ 0"
4	Petr Rikunov	Chengdu DYC Cycling Team	+ 0"
5	Henok Mulubrhan (ERI)	XDS Astana Team	+ 0"
6	Cristian David Pita (ECU)	Huansheng–Vonoa–Taishan Sport Cycling Team	+ 0"
7	Norman Vahtra (EST)	China Anta–Mentech Cycling Team	+ 0"
8	Cesar Macias (MEX)	Petrolike	+ 0"
9	Rodrigo Álvarez (ESP)	Burgos Burpellet BH	+ 0"
10	Henrique da Silva Avancini (BRA)	Factor Racing	+ 0"

General classification after Stage 8
Rank	Rider	Team	Time
1	Henok Mulubrhan (ERI)	XDS Astana Team	30h 05' 13"
2	Guillermo Thomas Silva (URU)	Caja Rural–Seguros RGA	+ 2"
3	Harold Martín López (ECU)	XDS Astana Team	+ 22"
4	Edison Alejandro Callejas (COL)	Petrolike	+ 25"
5	Jon Agirre (ESP)	Euskaltel–Euskadi	+ 27"
6	Alex Tolio (ITA)	VF Group–Bardiani–CSF–Faizanè	+ 27"
7	Jonathan Klever Caicedo (ECU)	Petrolike	+ 32"
8	Clément Alleno (FRA)	Burgos Burpellet BH	+ 36"
9	Ludovico Crescioli (ITA)	Team Polti VisitMalta	+ 39"
10	Antonio Jesús Soto (ESP)	Equipo Kern Pharma	+ 42"

== Classification leadership table ==
Classification leadership by stage
Stage	Winner	General classification	Points classification	Mountains classification	Team classification
1	Manuel Peñalver	Manuel Peñalver	Manuel Peñalver	Timofei Ivanov	Petrolike
2	Guillermo Thomas Silva	Guillermo Thomas Silva	Henok Mulubrhan	Simon Pellaud	Caja Rural–Seguros RGA
3	Alexander Salby	Guillermo Thomas Silva	Manuel Peñalver	Simon Pellaud	Caja Rural–Seguros RGA
4	Martin Laas	Guillermo Thomas Silva	Alexander Salby	Simon Pellaud	Caja Rural–Seguros RGA
5	Carlos Alfonso García	Guillermo Thomas Silva	Guillermo Thomas Silva	Simon Pellaud	Caja Rural–Seguros RGA
6	Henok Mulubrhan	Guillermo Thomas Silva	Guillermo Thomas Silva	Simon Pellaud	XDS Astana Team
7	Petr Rikunov	Henok Mulubrhan	Guillermo Thomas Silva	Jon Agirre	XDS Astana Team
8	Alexander Salby	Henok Mulubrhan	Henok Mulubrhan	Jon Agirre	XDS Astana Team
Final		Henok Mulubrhan	Henok Mulubrhan	Jon Agirre	XDS Astana Team

== Classification standings ==
Legend
Denotes the winner of the general classification
Denotes the winner of the points classification
Denotes the winner of the mountains classification

=== General classification ===
Final general classification (1–10)
Rank	Rider	Team	Time
1	Henok Mulubrhan (ERI)	XDS Astana Team	30h 05' 13"
2	Guillermo Thomas Silva (URU)	Caja Rural–Seguros RGA	+ 2"
3	Harold Martín López (ECU)	XDS Astana Team	+ 22"
4	Edison Alejandro Callejas (COL)	Petrolike	+ 25"
4	Jon Agirre (ESP)	Euskaltel–Euskadi	+ 27"
6	Alex Tolio (ITA)	VF Group–Bardiani–CSF–Faizanè	+ 27"
7	Jonathan Klever Caicedo (ECU)	Petrolike	+ 32"
8	Clément Alleno (FRA)	Burgos Burpellet BH	+ 36"
9	Ludovico Crescioli (ITA)	Team Polti VisitMalta	+ 39"
10	Antonio Jesús Soto (ESP)	Equipo Kern Pharma	+ 42"

=== Points classification ===
Final points classification (1–10)
Rank	Rider	Team	Points
1	Henok Mulubrhan (ERI)	XDS Astana Team	77
2	Guillermo Thomas Silva (URU)	Caja Rural–Seguros RGA	67
3	Alexander Salby (DEN)	Li-Ning Star	59
4	Petr Rikunov	Chengdu DYC Cycling Team	59
5	Manuel Peñalver (ESP)	Team Polti VisitMalta	53
6	Aaron Gate (NZL)	XDS Astana Team	43
7	Enrico Zanoncello (ITA)	VF Group–Bardiani–CSF–Faizanè	35
8	Miguel Ángel Fernández (ESP)	Equipo Kern Pharma	34
9	Eduard-Michael Grosu (ROM)	Huansheng–Vonoa–Taishan Sport Cycling Team	33
10	Javier Serrano (ESP)	Team Polti VisitMalta	29

=== Mountains classification ===
Final mountains classification (1–10)
Rank	Rider	Team	Points
1	Jon Agirre (ESP)	Euskaltel–Euskadi	33
2	Simon Pellaud (SUI)	Li-Ning Star	29
3	Henok Mulubrhan (ERI)	XDS Astana Team	14
4	Hasan Seyfollahifard (IRN)	Tianyoude Hotel Cycling Team	14
5	Luca Covili (ITA)	VF Group–Bardiani–CSF–Faizanè	10
6	Petros Mengs (ERI)	Istanbul Büyükșehir Belediye Spor Türkiye	9
7	Florian Samuel Kajamini (ITA)	XDS Astana Team	8
8	George Jackson (NZL)	Burgos Burpellet BH	8
9	Jonathan Klever Caicedo (ECU)	Petrolike	7
10	Giovanni Carboni (ITA)	Unibet Tietema Rockets	7

=== Team classification ===
Final team classification (1–10)
Rank	Team	Time
1	(Kazakhstan) XDS Astana Team	90h 17' 45"
2	(Spain) Equipo Kern Pharma	+ 29"
3	(Spain) Euskaltel–Euskadi	+ 32"
4	(Italy) VF Group–Bardiani–CSF–Faizanè	+ 2' 22"
5	(Spain) Caja Rural–Seguros RGA	+ 4' 10"
6	(Mexico) Petrolike	+ 4' 14"
7	(Spain) Burgos Burpellet BH	+ 7' 56"
8	(France) Unibet Tietema Rockets	+ 8' 19"
9	(China) Chengdu DYC Cycling Team	+ 9' 26"
10	(Malaysia) Terengganu Cycling Team	+ 12' 54"
