= 2021 Per sempre Alfredo =

2021 UCI Europe Tour

Race details
- Dates: 21 March 2021
- Stages: 1
- Distance: 161.91 km (100.6 mi)
- Winning time: 3h 48' 10"

Results
	Winner	Matteo Moschetti (ITA)	(Trek–Segafredo)
	Second	Mikel Aristi (ESP)	(Euskaltel–Euskadi)
	Third	Samuele Zambelli (ITA)	(Italy)

The 2021 Per sempre Alfredo was the 1st edition of the Per sempre Alfredo road cycling one day race, which was held on 21 March 2021, starting in the city of Florence and finishing in Alfredo Martini's home town of Sesto Fiorentino.

The race was won in a sprint by Matteo Moschetti (Trek–Segafredo) ahead of Mikel Aristi (Euskaltel–Euskadi) and Samuele Zambelli (Italy).

== Teams ==
Two UCI WorldTeams, seven UCI ProTeams, ten UCI Continental teams, and the Italian national team made up the twenty teams that participated in the race. All teams entered seven riders each, for a total of 140 riders, of which 113 finished.

UCI WorldTeams

- Team DSM
- Trek–Segafredo

UCI ProTeams

- Androni Giocattoli–Sidermec
- Bardiani–CSF–Faizanè
- Caja Rural–Seguros RGA
- Eolo–Kometa
- Euskaltel–Euskadi
- Gazprom–RusVelo
- Vini Zabù

UCI Continental Teams

- Amore & Vita
- Beltrami TSA–Tre Colli
- General Store–Fratelli Curia–Essegibi
- Giotti Victoria–Savini Due
- Global 6 Cycling
- MG.K vis VPM
- Team Colpack–Ballan
- Team Qhubeka
- Work Service–Marchiol–Vega
- Zalf Euromobil Fior

National Teams

- Italy

== Result ==
Result
Rank	Rider	Team	Time
1	Matteo Moschetti (ITA)	Trek–Segafredo	3h 48' 10"
2	Mikel Aristi (ESP)	Euskaltel–Euskadi	+ 0"
3	Samuele Zambelli (ITA)	Italy	+ 0"
4	Jon Aberasturi (ESP)	Caja Rural–Seguros RGA	+ 0"
5	Luca Colnaghi (ITA)	Italy	+ 0"
6	Giovanni Lonardi (ITA)	Bardiani–CSF–Faizanè	+ 0"
7	Stefano Gandin (ITA)	Zalf Euromobil Fior	+ 0"
8	Tommaso Nencini (ITA)	Italy	+ 0"
9	Natnael Tesfatsion (ERI)	Androni Giocattoli–Sidermec	+ 0"
10	Marius Mayrhofer (GER)	Team DSM	+ 0"
