= Nicola Conci =

Italian racing cyclist (born 1997)

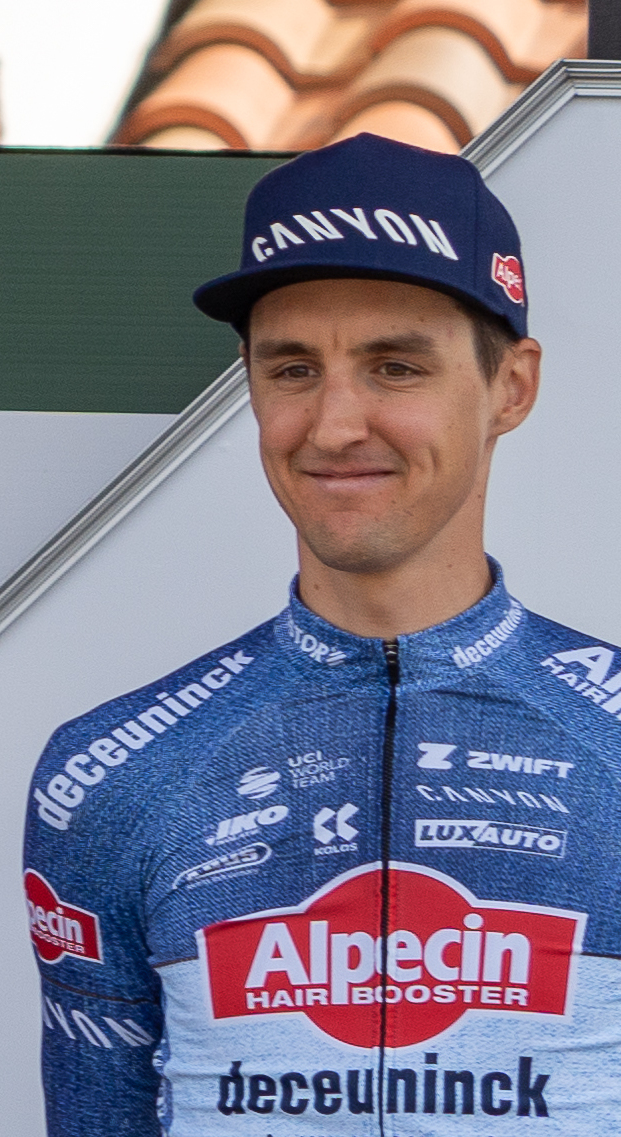
- Conci at the 2024 Tour of the Basque Country

Personal information
- Full name: Nicola Conci
- Born: 5 January 1997 (age 29) Trento, Italy
- Height: 1.84 m (6 ft 0 in)
- Weight: 68 kg (150 lb)

Cycling career
- Sport: Cycling
- Current team: XDS Astana Team
- Discipline: Road
- Role: Rider

Amateur team
- 2016–2017: Zalf–Euromobil–Désirée–Fior

Professional teams
- 2017: Trek–Segafredo (stagiaire)
- 2018–2021: Trek–Segafredo
- 2022: Gazprom–RusVelo
- 2022: Alpecin–Fenix Development Team
- 2023–2024: Alpecin–Deceuninck
- 2025–: XDS Astana Team

Nicola Conci (born 5 January 1997) is an Italian cyclist, who rides for UCI WorldTeam XDS Astana Team.

== Career ==
In August 2018, he was named in the startlist for the Vuelta a España. In May 2019, he was named in the startlist for the 2019 Giro d'Italia.

After Gazprom–RusVelo lost its UCI license and its riders lost their contracts on 1 March 2022, Conci was left without a job. On 16 May 2022 it was announced that Conci would ride for Alpecin–Fenix Development Team on a 1-year contract.

== Major results ==
2017
1st Gran Premio Sportivi di Poggiana
1st Trofeo Città di San Vendemiano
4th Trofeo Piva
6th Ruota d'Oro
6th Trofeo Edil C
7th Overall Giro Ciclistico d'Italia
8th G.P. Palio del Recioto
2019
5th Overall Adriatica Ionica Race
2020
5th Overall Settimana Internazionale di Coppi e Bartali
6th Coppa Sabatini
2022
3rd Overall Arctic Race of Norway
3rd Veneto Classic
6th Overall Tour of Slovenia
6th Overall Giro di Sicilia
7th Giro del Veneto
9th Per sempre Alfredo
10th Overall Settimana Internazionale di Coppi e Bartali
2023
9th Figueira Champions Classic
2026
4th Overall Giro d'Abruzzo
7th Coppa Agostoni

=== Grand Tour general classification results timeline ===
Grand Tour	2018	2019	2020	2021	2022	2023	2024
Giro d'Italia	—	63	52	—	—	DNF	23
Tour de France	—	—	—	—	—	—	—
Vuelta a España	DNF	—	—	—	—	—	—

Legend
—	Did not compete
DNF	Did not finish
