= Paolo Simion =

Italian cyclist

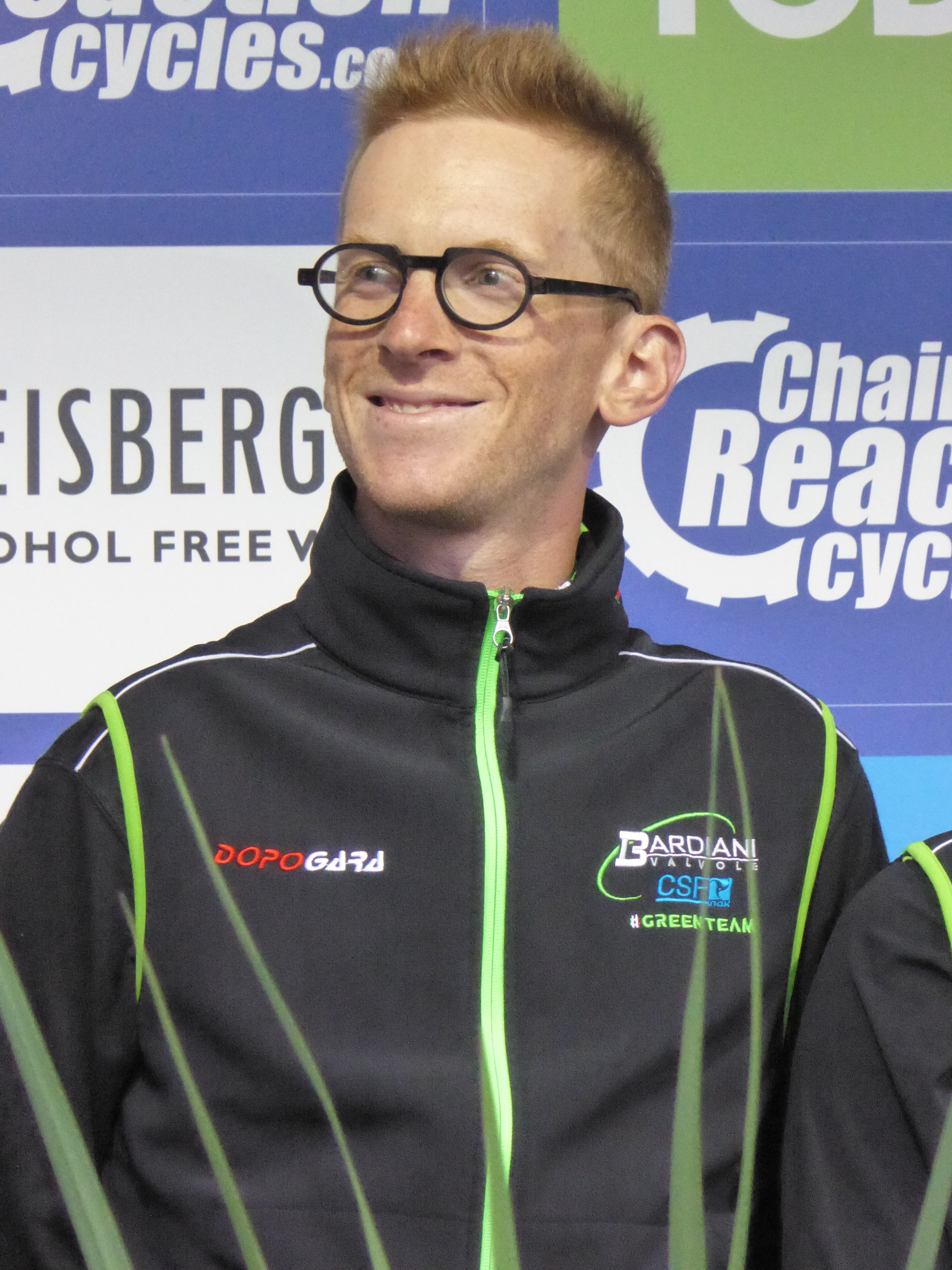
- Simion at the 2016 Tour of Britain.

Personal information
- Full name: Paolo Simion
- Born: 10 October 1992 (age 34) Castelfranco Veneto, Italy
- Height: 1.85 m (6 ft 1 in)
- Weight: 79 kg (174 lb)

Cycling career
- Sport: Cycling
- Current team: Retired
- Disciplines: Road; Track
- Role: Rider
- Rider type: Sprinter

Amateur teams
- 2011–2013: Zalf–Euromobil–Désirée–Fior
- 2014: G.S. Mastromarco–Chianti Sensi–Benedetti
- 2014: Bardiani–CSF (stagiaire)

Professional teams
- 2015–2019: Bardiani–CSF
- 2020: Tianyoude Hotel Cycling Team
- 2021: Giotti Victoria–Savini Due
Medal record
Men's track cycling
Representing Italy
European Championships
Bronze medal – third place	2012 Panevėžys	Team pursuit

Paolo Simion (born 10 October 1992) is an Italian former professional racing cyclist, who competed as a professional from 2015 to 2021. He rode in three editions of the Giro d'Italia.

== Major results ==
=== Road ===
2012
1st Circuito del Porto
2013
1st Circuito del Porto
1st Stage 5 Giro della Regione Friuli Venezia Giulia
2014
4th Gran Premio della Liberazione
10th Memorial Gianni Biz
10th Alta Padovana Tour
2016
3rd Coppa Bernocchi
6th London–Surrey Classic
2018
1st Stage 6 Tour of Croatia
3rd Coppa Bernocchi

==== Grand Tour general classification results timeline ====
Grand Tour	2016	2017	2018	2019
Giro d'Italia	131	—	145	140
Tour de France	—	—	—	—
Vuelta a España	—	—	—	—

Legend
—	Did not compete
DNF	Did not finish

=== Track ===
2009
National Junior Championships

1st Team pursuit
1st Team sprint

2010
UEC European Junior Championships

1st Omnium
2nd Team pursuit

National Junior Championships

1st Team pursuit
1st Scratch

2011
2nd Team pursuit, National Championships
2012
2012–13 UCI World Cup

1st Omnium, Cali

2nd Team pursuit, National Championships
3rd Team pursuit, European Track Championships
2013
National Championships

1st Team pursuit
2nd Madison
2nd Team sprint
3rd Individual pursuit
