= Stefano Gandin =

Italian cyclist

Personal information
- Born: 29 March 1996 (age 30) Vittorio Veneto, Italy
- Height: 1.85 m (6 ft 1 in)
- Weight: 69 kg (152 lb)

Cycling career
- Sport: Cycling
- Current team: Retired
- Discipline: Road
- Role: Rider

Amateur teams
- 2009–2012: Pedale Marense
- 2013: Marchiol–San Michele Vetri
- 2015: Industrial Forniture Moro–San Michele Vetri Trecieffe
- 2016: Marchiol–San Michele Vetri–Basso
- 2017: US Fausto Coppi–Gazzera–Videa
- 2018: Work Service Videa Coppi Gazzera
- 2019: Delio Gallina Colosio Eurofeed
- 2020: Zalf–Euromobil–Désirée–Fior

Professional teams
- 2021: Zalf Euromobil Fior
- 2022–2023: Team Corratec

Stefano Gandin (born 29 March 1996) is an Italian former racing cyclist, who competed as a professional from 2021 to 2023.

== Major results ==
2019
2nd V4 Special Series Debrecen–Ibrany
5th Overall Tour de Serbie
9th Visegrad 4 Kerekparverseny
10th Overall Tour du Maroc

1st Stage 4

2020
1st Giro delle Due Province
2021
7th Per sempre Alfredo
9th GP Adria Mobil
2022
1st Mountains classification, Giro di Sicilia
1st Stage 3b Sibiu Cycling Tour
1st Stages 1 & 8 Vuelta a Venezuela
9th Grand Prix Alanya
2023
Combativity award Stage 5 Giro d'Italia

=== Grand Tour general classification results timeline ===
Grand Tour	2023
Giro d'Italia	DNF
Tour de France	—
Vuelta a España	—

Legend
—	Did not compete
DNF	Did not finish
