= Circuito del Porto =

Italian one-day road cycling race

Race details
- Date: May
- Region: Lombardy
- Discipline: Road race
- Competition: UCI Europe Tour
- Type: Single day race
- Organiser: Club Ciclistico Cremonese 1891

History
- First edition: 1967
- Editions: 59 (as of 2026)
- First winner: Mauro Landini (ITA)
- Most wins: Alberto Destro (ITA); Paolo Simion (ITA); (2 wins)
- Most recent: Alessio Delle Vedove (ITA)

The Circuito del Porto-Trofeo Arvedi is a professional one day cycling race held annually in Italy. It is part of UCI Europe Tour in category 1.2.

== Winners ==
| Year | Country | Rider | Team |
|---|---|---|---|
| 1967 | Italy | Mauro Landini | Codifiume–Ferrara |
| 1968 | Italy | Valerio Valenti | Pedale Melzese–Milano |
| 1969 | Italy | Andrea Ciatti | C.C. Cremonese 1891 |
| 1970 | Italy | Pietro Algeri | G.S. Cima–Bergamo |
| 1971 | Italy | Gianfranco Foresti | Domus–Bergamo |
| 1972 | Italy | Valerio Lualdi | Lainatese–Milano |
| 1973 | Italy | Alessandro Cardelli | Monsummannese |
| 1974 | Italy | Giuseppe Colombo | S.C. Bettolino Lapa |
| 1975 | Italy | Roberto Ceruti | G.S. Itla |
| 1976 | Italy | Agostino Bertagnoli | G.S. Scalvini |
| 1977 | Italy | Mario Noris | S.C. Ciclo Lombardo Framesi |
| 1978 | Italy | Emanuele Seghezzi | G.S. Bonetti Trescore |
| 1979 | Italy | Maurizio Piovani | G.S. System Holz |
| 1980 | Italy | Silvestro Milani | S.S. Nuova Baggio |
| 1981 | Italy | Luigi Ferreri | G.S. Mecair–Milano |
| 1982 | Italy | Dario Montani | G.S. Isal Tessari |
| 1983 | Italy | Umberto Viganò | Supermercati Brianzoli |
| 1984 | Italy | Angelo Tosi | Bresciplast |
| 1985 | Italy | Ettore Badolato | G.S. Passerini |
| 1986 | Italy | Ercole Mores | G.S. Michelin FGM |
| 1987 | Italy | Alberto Destro | Coalca Cantagrillo–Pistoia |
| 1988 | Italy | Luigi Tessaro | Diadora Treviso |
| 1989 | Italy | Riccardo Tarlao | G.S. Fausto Coppi |
| 1990 | Italy | Angelo Tameni | Bubiline Silva |
| 1991 | Italy | Claudio Camin | Caneva–Pordenone |
| 1992 | Italy | Nicola Minali | MG Bois–Treviso |
| 1993 | Italy | Federico Colonna | G.S. Grassi–Filati Alessandra |
| 1994 | Italy | Michele Zamboni | Zalf–Euromobil–Fior |
| 1995 | Italy | Alberto Destro | G.S. Brunero Bongioanni |
| 1996 | Italy | Enrico Bonetti | SC Pagnoncelli |
| 1997 | Italy | Cristian Bianchini | SC Pagnoncelli |
| 1998 | Italy | Nicola Chesini | SC Pagnoncelli |
| 1999 | Italy | Alessandro Romio | G.S. Podenzano |
| 2000 | Brazil | Luciano Pagliarini | G.S.C. B.F. Cycling Team |
| 2001 | Italy | Juri Alvisi | Cycling Team Eternedile |
| 2002 | Italy | Stefano Bonini | San Pellegrino–Bottoli–Artoni |
| 2003 | Ukraine | Yuriy Ivanov | G.S. Luigi Maserati–Synclean |
| 2004 | Italy | Mattia Gavazzi | Team Cioli |
| 2005 | Argentina | Maximiliano Richeze | Parolin–Ramonda–Seca |
| 2006 | Italy | Manolo Zanella | Zalf–Désirée–Fior |
| 2007 | Italy | Jacopo Guarnieri | Marchiol–Ima–Famila–Liquigas–Site |
| 2008 | Italy | Michele Nodari | C.C. Cremonese Arvedi Unidelta Garda |
| 2009 | Italy | Filippo Baggio | Bottoli Nordelettrica Ramonda |
| 2010 | Italy | Marco Amicabile | Delio Gallina–S. Inox |
| 2011 | Italy | Cristian Rossi | Team Casati Named |
| 2012 | Italy | Paolo Simion | Zalf–Euromobil–Désirée–Fior |
| 2013 | Italy | Paolo Simion | Zalf–Euromobil–Désirée–Fior |
| 2014 | Italy | Jakub Mareczko | Viris Maserati |
| 2015 | Italy | Riccardo Minali | Team Colpack |
| 2016 | Italy | Marco Maronese | Zalf–Euromobil–Désirée–Fior |
| 2017 | Italy | Imerio Cima | Viris Maserati |
| 2018 | Italy | Giovanni Lonardi | Zalf–Euromobil–Désirée–Fior |
| 2019 | Italy | Luca Mozzato | Dimension Data for Qhubeka |
| 2020 | No race due to the COVID-19 pandemic in Italy | | |
| 2021 | Russia | Gleb Syritsa | Russia (national team) |
| 2022 | Italy | Davide Persico | Team Colpack–Ballan |
| 2023 | Italy | Mattia Pinazzi | Biesse–Carrera |
| 2024 | Italy | Jakub Mareczko | Team Corratec–Vini Fantini |
| 2025 | Slovenia | Žak Eržen | Bahrain Victorious Development Team |
| 2026 | Italy | Alessio Delle Vedove | XDS Astana Development Team |
