= Aurum bikes =

Spanish bicycle manufacturer

- Company type: Private
- Industry: Bicycles
- Founded: 2020
- Headquarters: Pinto, Spain
- Key people: Alberto Contador (founder), Ivan Basso (founder)
- Products: Bicycle and Related Components
- Website: https://aurumbikes.com/

Aurum bikes is a Spanish brand of high-end road bikes, founded by former cyclists and multiple Grand Tour winners Alberto Contador and Ivan Basso in 2020.

== Sponsorship ==
The Aurum Magma, equipped with full ENVE components and SRAM groupset, is the bike used by the Polti–Kometa UCI Pro Continental team.
