= Mikel Aristi =

Spanish cyclist (born 1993)

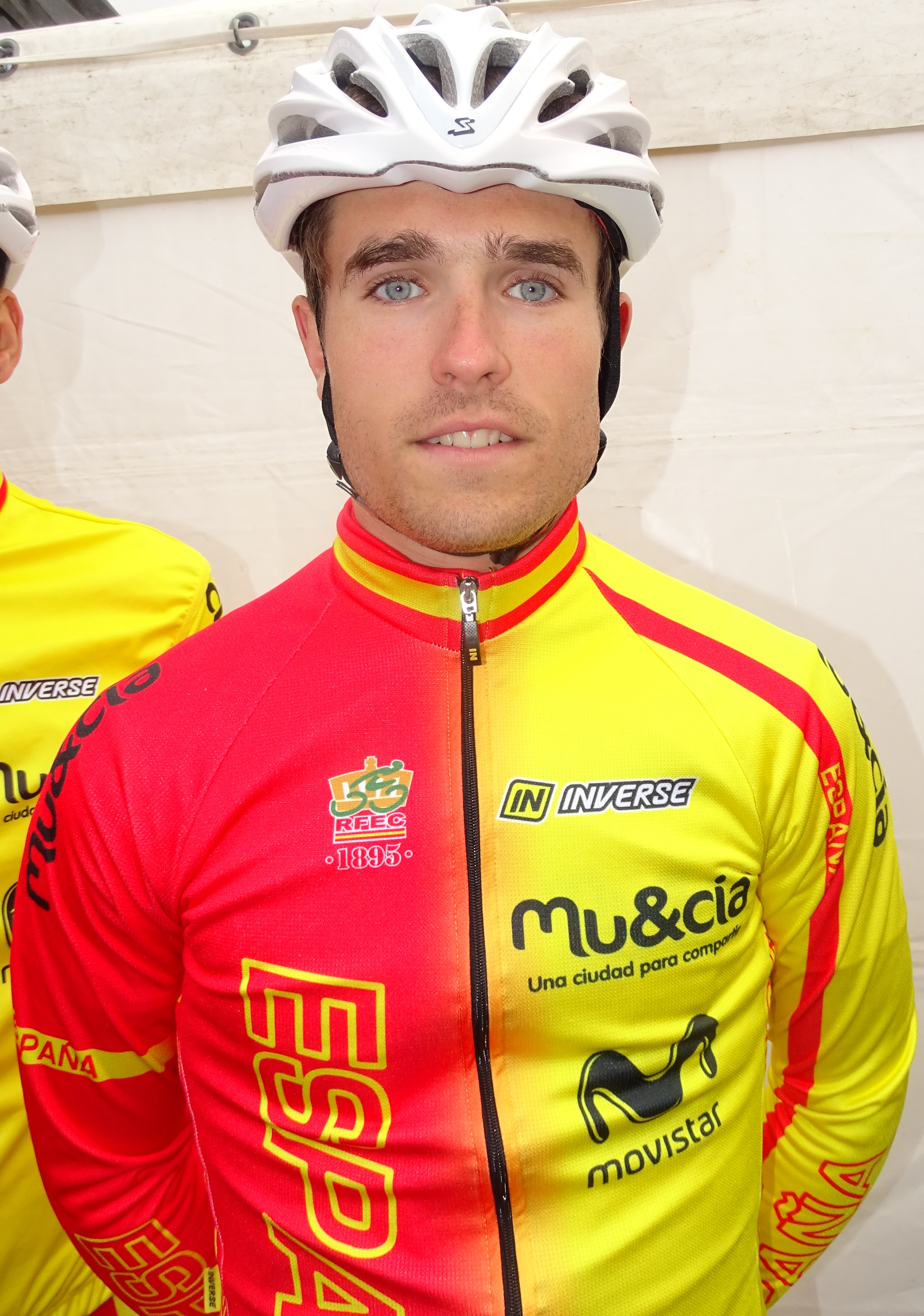
- Aristi in April 2015

Personal information
- Full name: Mikel Aristi Gardoki
- Born: 28 May 1993 (age 33) Bergara, Spain
- Height: 1.8 m (5 ft 11 in)
- Weight: 72 kg (159 lb)

Cycling career
- Sport: Cycling
- Current team: Retired
- Discipline: Road
- Role: Rider

Amateur teams
- 2012: Debabarrena
- 2015: Fundación Euskadi–EDP

Professional teams
- 2013–2014: Euskadi
- 2016–2017: Delko–Marseille Provence KTM
- 2018–2019: Euskadi–Murias
- 2020–2022: Fundación–Orbea

Mikel Aristi Gardoki (born 28 May 1993 in Bergara, Spain) is a Spanish former cyclist, who competed as a professional from 2013 to 2022.

== Major results ==
2014
1st Stage 1 (TTT) Tour de Gironde
2015
1st Vuelta a Toledo
1st Stage 2 Volta a Coruña
1st Stage 2 Vuelta a Cantabria
2017
1st Stage 1 La Tropicale Amissa Bongo
6th Gran Premio della Costa Etruschi
2018
7th Tro-Bro Léon
2019
1st Stage 2 Volta a Portugal
4th Overall Tour du Limousin

1st Stage 2

2021
2nd Clàssica Comunitat Valenciana 1969
2nd Per sempre Alfredo
