= Zalf Euromobil Fior =

Italian cycling team

Team information
- UCI code: ZEF
- Registered: Italy
- Founded: 1982
- Disbanded: 2024
- Discipline: Road
- Status: Amateur (1982–1995); Domestic (1996–2020); UCI Continental team (2021–2024)
- Bicycles: Pinarello
- Website: Team home page

Key personnel
- General manager: Egidio Fior
- Team managers: Filippo Rocchetti; Ilario Contessa; Mauro Busato; Gianni Faresin

Team name history
- 1982–1985; 1986; 1987–1988; 1989–2002; 2003–2011; 2012–2020; 2021–2024: Zalf–Fior; Glem Gas–Zalf–Fior; Zalf–Fior; Zalf–Euromobil–Fior; Zalf–Désirée–Fior; Zalf–Euromobil–Désirée–Fior; Zalf–Euromobil–Fior

Zalf–Euromobil–Fior was an Italian cycling team founded in 1982, that focused on developing under-23 riders. Many famous riders rode for the team, including Sacha Modolo, Enrico Battaglin, Ivan Basso and Oscar Gatto. In 2021, the team moved up to UCI Continental level for the first time. The team folded at the end of 2024, after 43 seasons.

== Team roster ==
As of 7 March 2021.

Rider	Date of birth
Gabriele Benedetti (ITA)	9 June 2000 (age 26)
Davide Cattelan (ITA)	6 November 2001 (age 24)
Edoardo Faresin (ITA)	11 March 1998 (age 28)
Stefano Gandin (ITA)	28 March 1996 (age 30)
Federico Guzzo (ITA)	31 August 2001 (age 25)
Giulio Masotto (ITA)	14 May 1999 (age 27)
Elia Menegale (ITA)	5 March 1999 (age 27)
Manlio Moro (ITA)	17 March 2002 (age 24)

Rider	Date of birth
Alessio Portello (ITA)	7 February 2002 (age 24)
Lorenzo Quartucci (ITA)	5 April 1999 (age 27)
Simone Raccani (ITA)	2 March 2001 (age 25)
Samuel Slomp (ITA)	24 September 2001 (age 24)
Alex Tolio (ITA)	30 March 2000 (age 26)
Riccardo Verza (ITA)	22 August 1997 (age 29)
Edoardo Zambanini (ITA)	21 April 2001 (age 25)
Matteo Zurlo (ITA)	1 August 1998 (age 28)

== Major results ==
2005
Giro del Canavese, Oscar Gatto
2006
GP Capodarco, Marco Bandiera
Giro del Casentino, Sacha Modolo
Coppa Città di Asti, Oscar Gatto
Giro del Belvedere, Fabrizio Galeazzi
Circuito del Porto, Manolo Zanella
2007
Giro delle Valli Aretine, Davide Malacarne
Gran Premio della Liberazione, Manuele Boaro
Trofeo Franco Balestra, Simone Ponzi
Trofeo Zsšdi, Simone Ponzi
2008
Gran Premio Palio del Recioto, Gianluca Brambilla
Trofeo Zsšdi, Manuele Boaro
2009
Overall Giro del Friuli-Venezia Giulia, Gianluca Brambilla
Memorial Davide Fardelli, Manuele Boaro
Trofeo Città di San Vendemiano, Alessandro Mazzi
Giro delle Valli Aretine, Enrico Battaglin
Gran Premio della Liberazione, Sacha Modolo
Giro del Belvedere, Sacha Modolo
2010
Trofeo Alcide Degasperi, Sonny Colbrelli
GP Capodarco, Enrico Battaglin
Trofeo Piva, Andrea Pasqualon
Giro del Casentino, Andrea Pasqualon
Gran Premio San Giuseppe, Enrico Battaglin
Trofeo Città di San Vendemiano, Stefano Agostini
2011
Overall Giro del Friuli-Venezia Giulia, Matteo Busato
Gran Premio San Giuseppe, Enrico Battaglin
Trofeo Zsšdi, Enrico Battaglin
Giro del Belvedere, Nicola Boem
2012
Circuito del Porto, Paolo Simion
2013
Ruota d'Oro, Andrea Toniatti
Trofeo Edil C, Andrea Zordan
Gran Premio di Poggiana, Andrea Zordan
Circuito del Porto, Paolo Simion
2014
Trofeo Città di San Vendemiano, Giacomo Berlato
Ruota d'Oro, Giacomo Berlato
Giro del Belvedere, Simone Andreetta
Stage 4 Giro del Friuli-Venezia Giulia, Simone Andreetta
Piccolo Giro di Lombardia, Gianni Moscon
2015
Coppa della Pace, Simone Velasco
Ruota d'Oro, Simone Velasco
Trofeo Città di San Vendemiano, Gianni Moscon
Giro del Belvedere, Andrea Vendrame
2016
Circuito del Porto, Marco Maronese
2017
La Popolarissima, Filippo Calderaro
Gran Premio di Poggiana, Nicola Conci
Trofeo Città di San Vendemiano, Nicola Conci
2018
La Popolarissima, Giovanni Lonardi
Circuito del Porto, Giovanni Lonardi
Trofeo Città di San Vendemiano, Alberto Dainese
Gran Premio Industrie del Marmo, Gregorio Ferri
2020
Giro Ciclistico d'Italia

1st Points classification, Luca Colnaghi
1st Young rider classification, Edoardo Zambanini
1st Stages 2 & 3, Luca Colnaghi

2022
Trofeo Città di San Vendemiano, Federico Guzzo

=== National Championships ===
2013
Romania road race, Andrei Nechita
Italy Under-23 road race, Andrea Zordan
2015
Italy Under-23 road race, Gianni Moscon
