= Clément Alleno =

French cyclist

Personal information
- Born: 8 October 2000 (age 26) Saint-Brieuc, France
- Height: 1.80 m (5 ft 11 in)
- Weight: 69 kg (152 lb)

Cycling career
- Sport: Cycling
- Current team: Burgos Burpellet BH
- Discipline: Road
- Role: Rider
- Rider type: Puncheur

Amateur teams
- 2017–2018: CC Uzelais
- 2019–2021: VC Pays de Loudéac
- 2022: Dinan Sport Cycling

Professional team
- 2023–: Burgos BH

Clément Alleno (born 8 October 2000) is a French cyclist, who currently rides for UCI ProTeam Burgos Burpellet BH.

Alleno turned professional in 2023 with Burgos BH, and won his first UCI level race in 2025 at the Tour of Mentougou. In 2026, he was selected to race the Vuelta a España.

== Major results ==
2022
6th Overall Tour de Bretagne
2023
8th Overall La Tropicale Amissa Bongo
8th Route Adélie de Vitré
2025
1st Overall Tour of Mentougou

1st Points classification
1st Stage 3

5th Prueba Villafranca de Ordizia
8th Overall Tour of Magnificent Qinghai
9th Overall Tour of Huangshan
2026
5th Overall Pune Grand Tour

1st Mountains classification

7th Overall Tour of Hainan
