= Giovanni Lonardi =

Italian cyclist

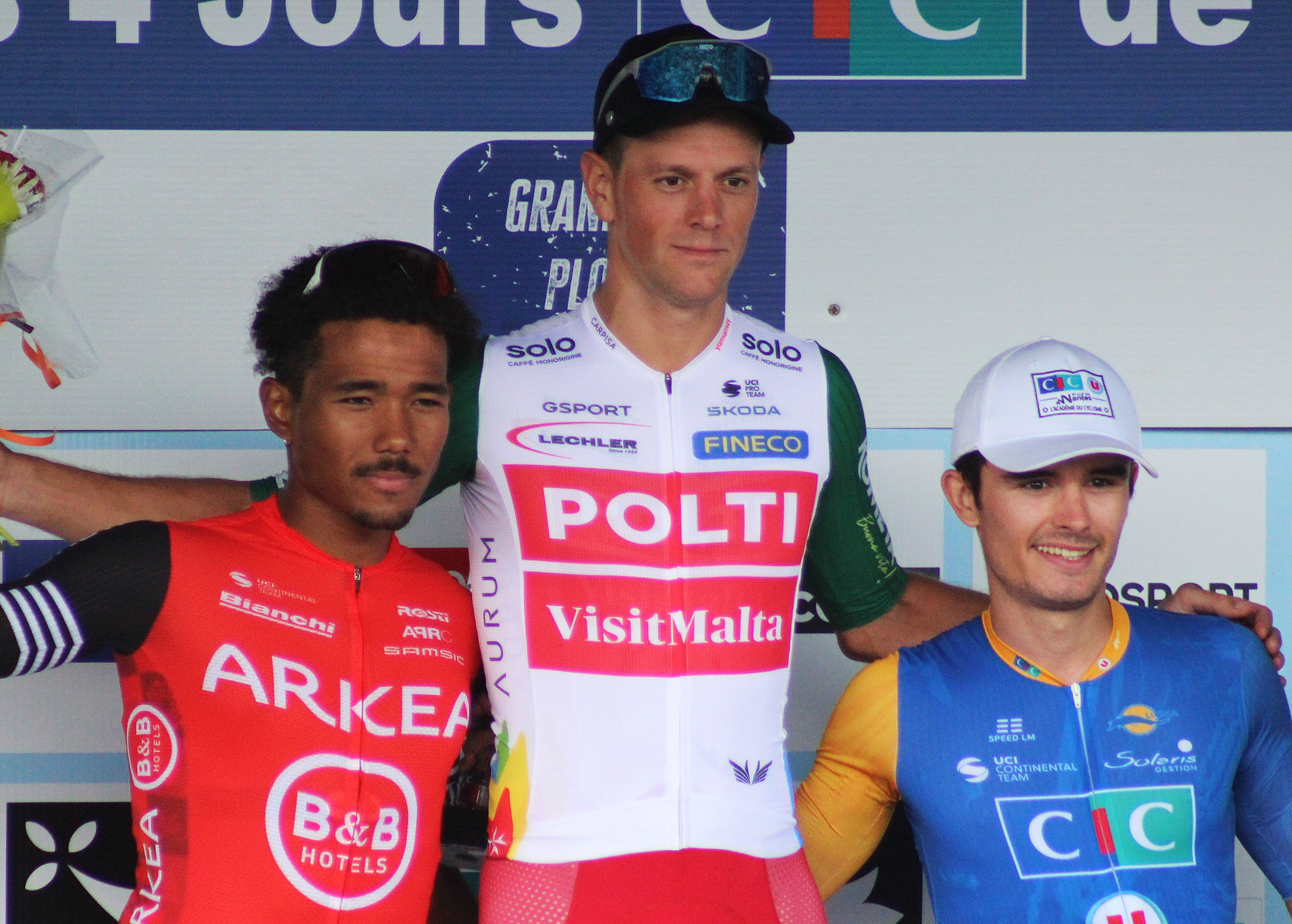
- Lonardi (center) in 2025

Personal information
- Born: 9 November 1996 (age 29) Verona, Italy
- Height: 1.80 m (5 ft 11 in)
- Weight: 70 kg (154 lb)

Cycling career
- Sport: Cycling
- Current team: Team Polti VisitMalta
- Discipline: Road
- Role: Rider
- Rider type: Sprinter

Amateur teams
- 2015–2017: General Store Bottoli Zardini
- 2018: Zalf–Euromobil–Désirée–Fior

Professional teams
- 2019: Nippo–Vini Fantini–Faizanè
- 2020–2021: Bardiani–CSF–Faizanè
- 2022–: Eolo–Kometa

Giovanni Lonardi (born 9 November 1996 in Verona) is an Italian cyclist, who currently rides for UCI ProTeam Team Polti VisitMalta. In May 2019, he was named in the startlist for the 2019 Giro d'Italia.

== Major results ==
2016
6th Circuito del Porto
2017
2nd Circuito del Porto
4th Popolarissima
6th Gran Premio della Liberazione
2018
1st Circuito del Porto
1st Popolarissima
1st Stage 1 Giro Ciclistico d'Italia
6th Trofeo Piva
9th ZLM Tour
2019 (2 pro wins)
Tour of Thailand

1st Points classification
1st Stage 1

1st Stage 5 Tour de Taiwan
2nd Tour of Antalya
2020 (1)
1st Stage 2 Tour of Antalya
2021
1st Stage 1 Tour of Bulgaria
3rd Circuito del Porto
6th Per sempre Alfredo
6th GP Slovenia
7th Trofeo Alcudia – Port d'Alcudia
2022
1st Clàssica Comunitat Valenciana 1969
2024 (1)
1st Points classification, Tour of Antalya
1st Stage 3 Tour of Turkey
2025 (1)
1st Grand Prix de Plouay (1.2)
1st Points classification, Tour of Turkey
3rd Coppa Bernocchi
3rd Tour de Vendée
4th Overall Tour of İstanbul

1st Stage 2

5th Clásica de Almería
6th Cholet Agglo Tour
7th Polynormande
2026 (1)
Arctic Race of Norway

1st Points classification
1st Stage 1

3rd Tour de Vendée
4th Route Adélie
5th Clàssica Comunitat Valenciana 1969
5th Trofeo Palma
6th Grand Prix de Fourmies

=== Grand Tour general classification results timeline ===
Grand Tour	2019	2020	2021	2022	2023	2024	2025	2026
Giro d'Italia	DNF	125	—	—	—	128	129	133
Tour de France	—	—	—	—	—	—	—	—
Vuelta a España	—	—	—	—	—	—	—	—
