= Antonio Nibali =

Italian cyclist (born 1992)

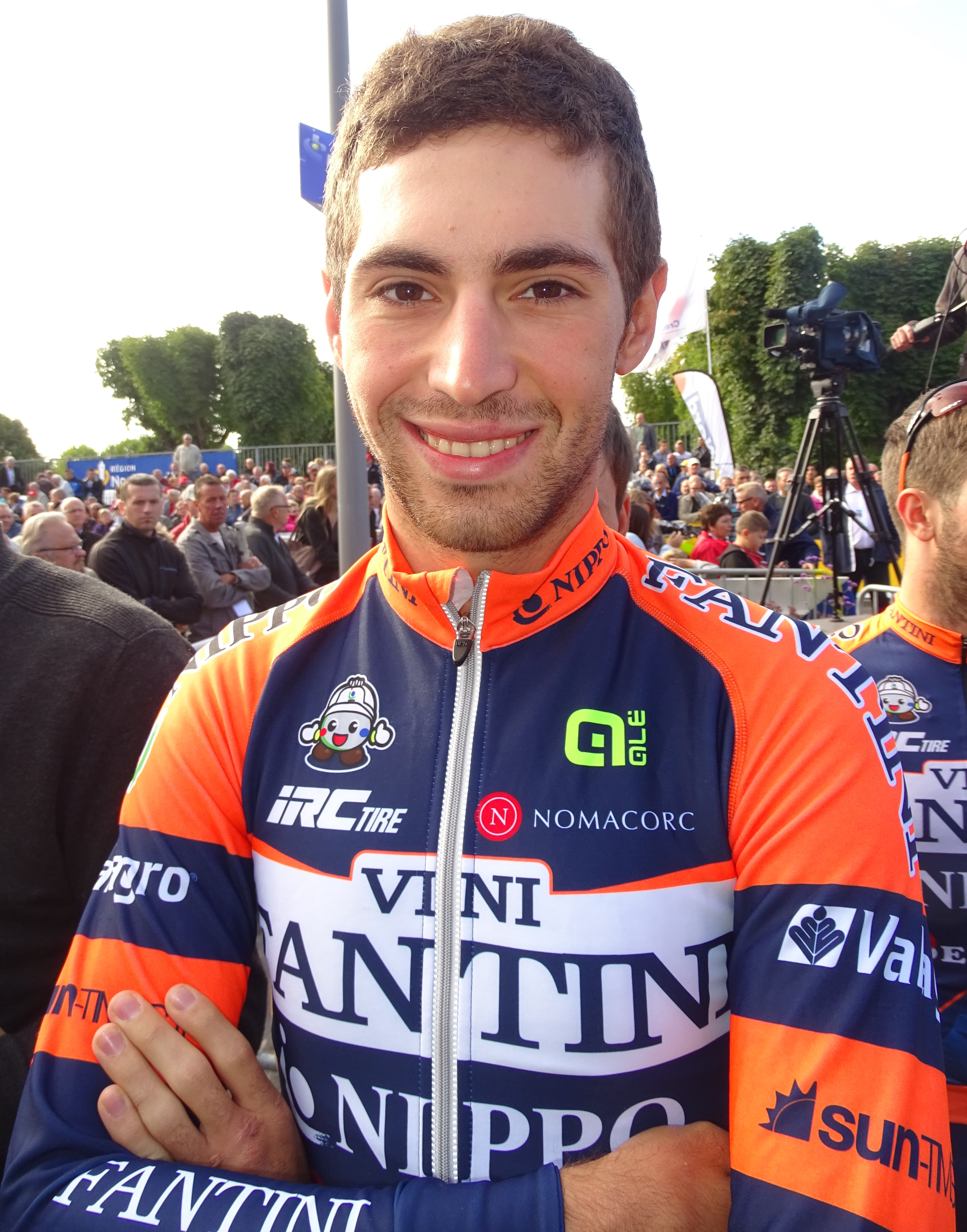
- Nibali at the 2015 Grand Prix de Fourmies

Personal information
- Nicknames: Baby shark, Il Pesciolino (The little fish)
- Born: 23 September 1992 (age 34) Messina, Italy
- Height: 1.80 m (5 ft 11 in)
- Weight: 65 kg (143 lb)

Cycling career
- Sport: Cycling
- Current team: XDS Astana Team
- Discipline: Road
- Role: Rider
- Rider type: Climbing specialist

Amateur team
- 2011–2013: Mastromarco Chianti Sensi Benedetti

Professional teams
- 2014: Marchiol-Emisfero
- 2015–2016: Nippo–Vini Fantini
- 2017–2019: Bahrain–Merida
- 2020–2021: Trek–Segafredo
- 2022–: Astana Qazaqstan Team

Antonio Nibali (born 23 September 1992) is an Italian professional racing cyclist, who currently rides for UCI WorldTeam XDS Astana Team.

He is the younger brother of fellow racing cyclist Vincenzo Nibali. He was named in the startlist for the 2017 Vuelta a España. In May 2018, he was named in the startlist for the 2018 Giro d'Italia. He also rode in the Giro d'Italia in 2019 and 2020; he placed 37th overall in the latter while riding in support of his brother. In August 2021, he was named to the start list for the Vuelta a España.

== Major results ==
2009
7th Trofeo Guido Dorigo
2010
9th Trofeo Città di Loano
10th Memorial Davide Fardelli
2013
3rd Overall Giro Ciclistico Pesca e Nettarina di Romagna Igp
2014
8th Trofeo Alcide Degasperi
2018
1st Stage 7 Tour of Austria
8th Gran Premio di Lugano
2022
10th Overall Giro di Sicilia
2023
2nd Overall Tour de Kyushu

=== Grand Tour general classification results timeline ===
Grand Tour	2017	2018	2019	2020	2021	2022
Giro d'Italia	—	100	76	37	—	
Tour de France	—	—	—	—	—	
Vuelta a España	102	—	—	—	108	

Legend
—	Did not compete
DNF	Did not finish
