= Andrea Zordan =

Italian cyclist (born 1992)

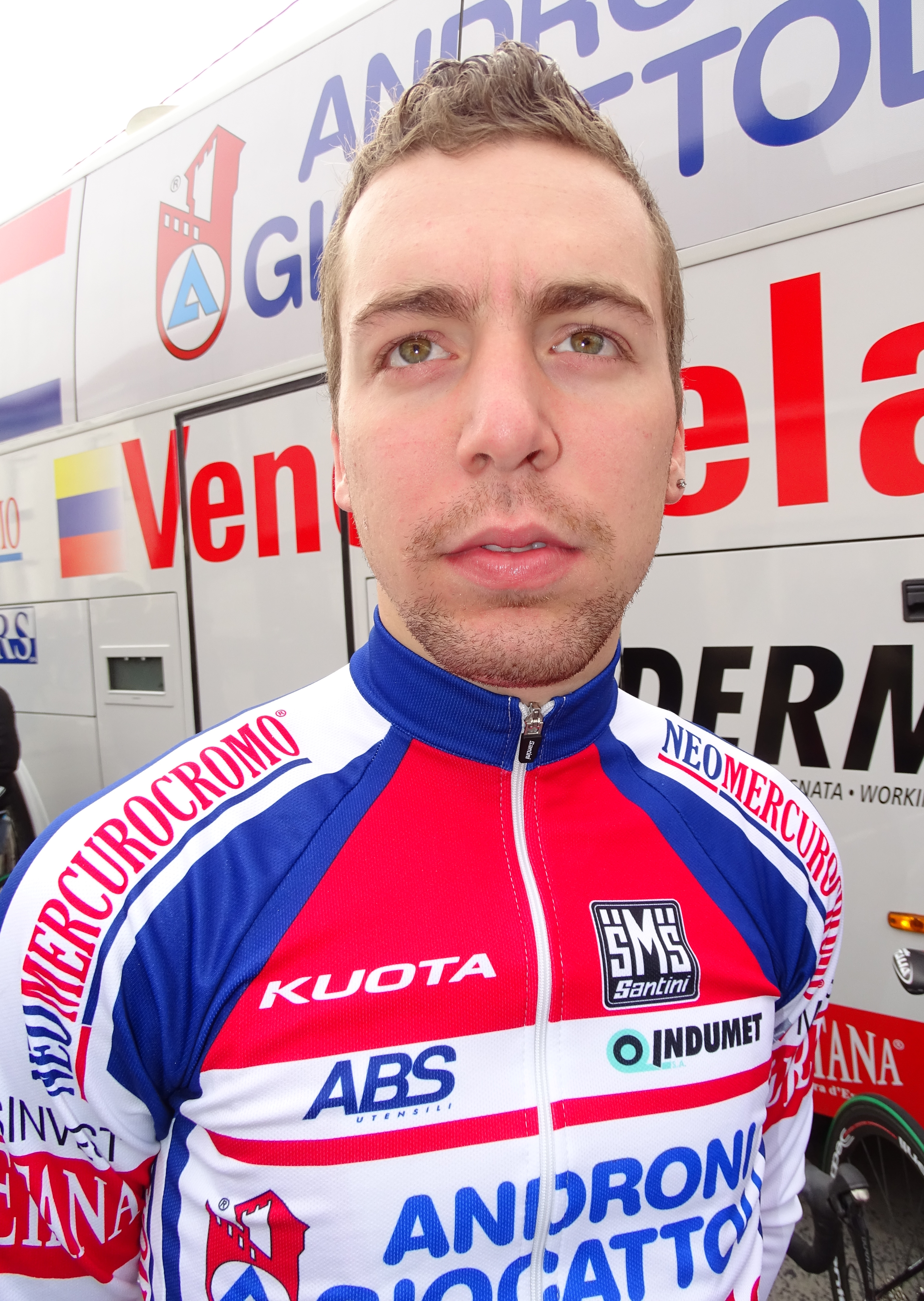
- Zordan in 2015

Personal information
- Full name: Andrea Zordan
- Born: 11 July 1992 (age 34) Venice, Italy

Cycling career
- Sport: Cycling
- Current team: Retired
- Discipline: Road
- Role: Rider

Amateur teams
- 2011–2012: U.C. Trevigiani–Dynamon–Bottoli
- 2013: Zalf Euromobil Désirée Fior

Professional teams
- 2013: Androni Giocattoli–Venezuela (stagiaire)
- 2014–2015: Androni Giocattoli–Venezuela
- 2016: Team Roth

Andrea Zordan (born 11 July 1992) is an Italian former racing cyclist, who competed for the Androni Giocattoli–Sidermec and Team Roth squads between 2014 and 2016.

== Major results ==
2013
1st Road race, National Under-23 Road Championships
1st Trofeo Edil C
1st Gran Premio di Poggiana
