= Per sempre Alfredo =

Race details
- Date: March
- Region: Toscana
- Discipline: Road
- Competition: UCI Europe Tour
- Type: One-day race
- Organiser: GS Emilia
- Web site: www.gsemilia.it

History
- First edition: 2021
- Editions: 3 (as of 2023)
- First winner: Matteo Moschetti (ITA)
- Most wins: No repeat winners
- Most recent: Felix Engelhardt (GER)

The Per sempre Alfredo is a one-day road cycling race held annually since 2021 in Toscana, Italy. It is on the UCI Europe Tour calendar as a 1.1 rated event. The race is named after Alfredo Martini and was first held a century after his birth.

== Winners ==
Year	Country	Rider	Team
2021	Italy	Matteo Moschetti	Trek–Segafredo
2022	Switzerland	Marc Hirschi	UAE Team Emirates
2023	Germany	Felix Engelhardt	Team Jayco–AlUla
