= Manuel Peñalver =

Spanish road racing cyclist

Personal information
- Full name: Manuel Peñalver Aniorte
- Born: 10 December 1998 (age 27) Torrevieja, Spain
- Height: 1.77 m (5 ft 10 in)
- Weight: 67 kg (148 lb)

Cycling career
- Sport: Cycling
- Current team: Team Polti VisitMalta
- Discipline: Road
- Role: Rider

Amateur team
- 2017: GSport–València Sports–Wolfbike

Professional teams
- 2018: Trevigiani Phonix–Hemus 1896
- 2019–2023: Burgos BH
- 2024–: Polti–Kometa

Manuel Peñalver Aniorte (born 10 December 1998 in Torrevieja) is a Spanish cyclist, who currently rides for UCI ProTeam Team Polti VisitMalta.

== Major results ==
2018
1st Stage 7 Tour of China I
2020
9th Trofeo Campos, Porreres, Felanitx, Ses Salines
2021
6th Grand Prix du Morbihan
9th Tour de Vendée
2023
8th Cholet-Pays de la Loire
2024
10th Vuelta a Castilla y León
2025
8th Clásica de Almería
2026
9th Clásica de Almería
9th Trofeo Palma
3rd La Popolarissima

=== Grand Tour general classification results timeline ===
Grand Tour	2022
Giro d'Italia	—
Tour de France	—
Vuelta a España	DNS

Legend
—	Did not compete
DNF	Did not finish
