= Luca Colnaghi =

Italian cyclist (born 1999)

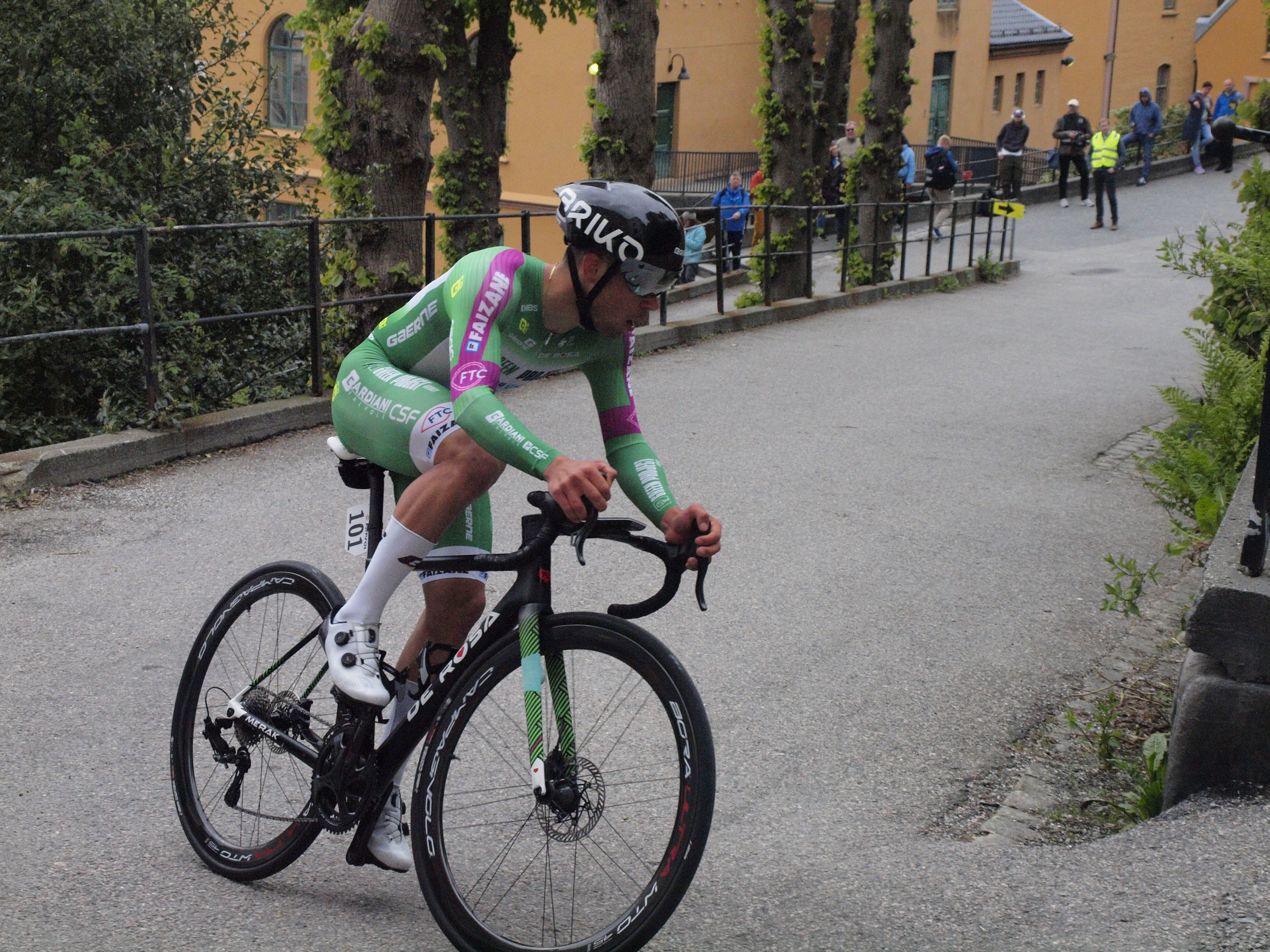
- Colnaghi at the 2023 Tour of Norway

Personal information
- Born: 14 January 1999 (age 27) Lecco, Italy

Cycling career
- Sport: Cycling
- Current team: Bardiani–CSF 7 Saber
- Discipline: Road
- Role: Rider

Amateur teams
- 2012–2015: Velo Club Sovico
- 2016–2017: Ciclistica Biringhello
- 2020: Zalf–Euromobil–Désirée–Fior
- 2021: UC Trevigiani–Campana Imballaggi
- 2021: Bardiani–CSF–Faizanè (stagiaire)

Professional teams
- 2018: Sangemini–MG.K Vis Vega
- 2019: Team Colpack–Ballan
- 2022–: Bardiani–CSF–Faizanè

Luca Colnaghi (born 14 January 1999) is an Italian racing cyclist, who currently rides for UCI ProTeam Bardiani–CSF 7 Saber.

== Major results ==
2016
2nd Road race, National Junior Road Championships
7th Trofeo comune di Vertova
2017
1st Trofeo Buffoni
3rd Gran Premio dell'Arno
4th Trofeo Emilio Paganessi
5th Montichiari–Roncone
9th Ronde van Vlaanderen Juniores
2018
5th Trofeo Città di Brescia
9th Gran Premio della Liberazione
2019
6th La Popolarissima
2020
Giro Ciclistico d'Italia

1st Points classification
1st Stages 2 & 3

3rd Road race, National Under-23 Road Championships
2021
2nd Trofeo Piva
4th Road race, National Under-23 Road Championships
5th Per sempre Alfredo
7th Road race, UCI Road World Under-23 Championships
2022
5th Trofeo Playa de Palma
2023
3rd GP Adria Mobil
6th Grand Prix Apollon Temple
2024
5th Trofeo Ses Salines-Felanitx
2025 (1 pro win)
1st Giro della Provincia di Reggio Calabria
