= Matteo Moschetti =

Italian bicycle racer

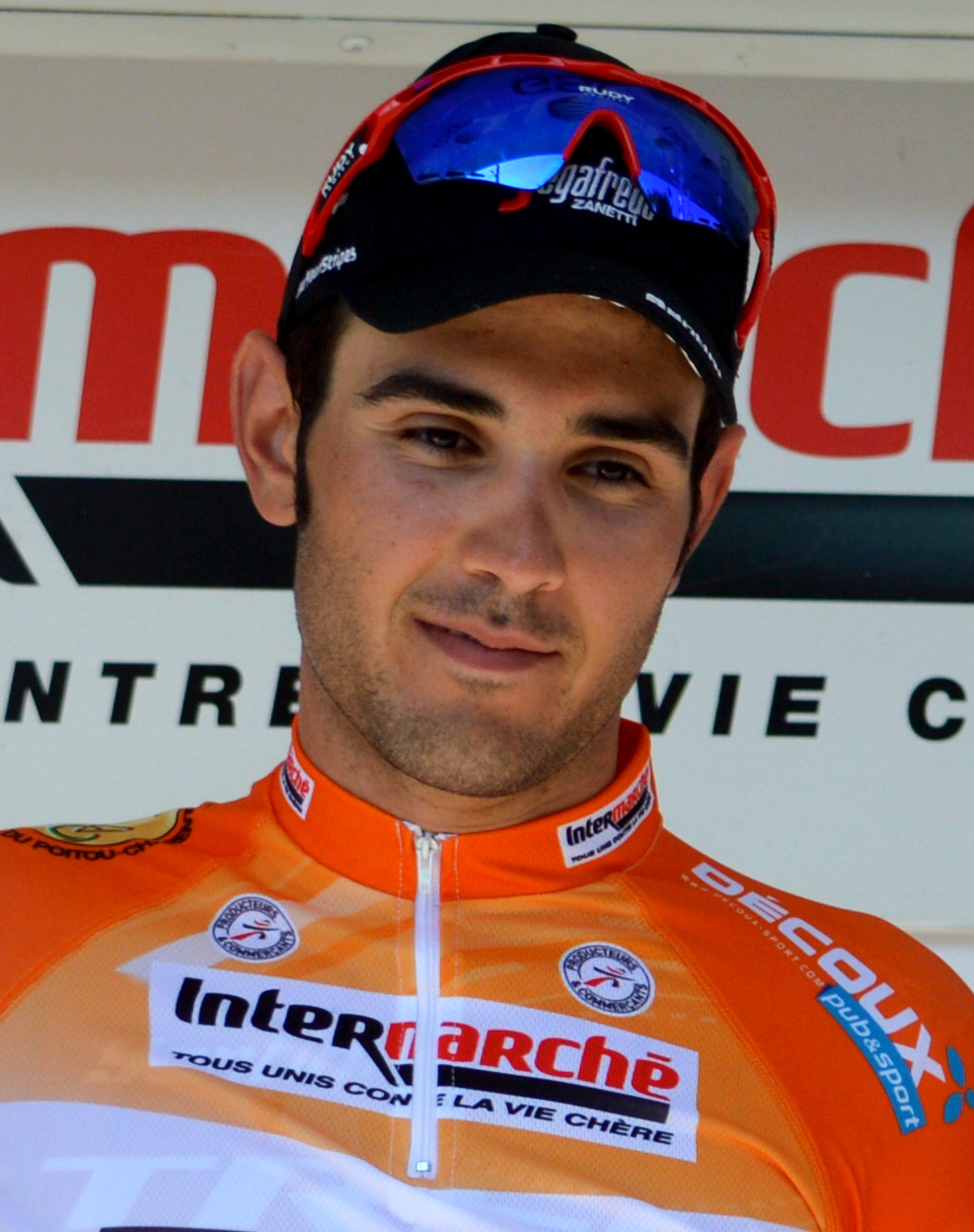

Personal information
- Full name: Matteo Moschetti
- Born: 14 August 1996 (age 30) Milan, Italy
- Height: 179 cm (5 ft 10 in)
- Weight: 73 kg (161 lb)

Cycling career
- Sport: Cycling
- Current team: Pinarello–Q36.5 Pro Cycling Team
- Discipline: Road
- Role: Rider
- Rider type: Sprinter

Amateur teams
- 2015–2017: Viris Maserati Sisal
- 2017: Trek–Segafredo (stagiaire)

Professional teams
- 2018: Polartec–Kometa
- 2018: Trek–Segafredo (stagiaire)
- 2019–2022: Trek–Segafredo
- 2023–: Q36.5 Pro Cycling Team

Major wins
- One-day races and Classics Clásica de Almería (2023)

Matteo Moschetti (born 14 August 1996) is an Italian cyclist, who currently rides for UCI ProTeam Pinarello–Q36.5 Pro Cycling Team.

== Career ==
=== Early years ===
As a junior, Moschetti raced on the road and track, winning the junior national team pursuit championships in 2014 with teammates Giovanni Pedretti, Imerio Cima and Giacomo Garavaglia. In 2017, Moschetti won his second national championship when he won the under-23 race at the Italian National Road Race Championships. At the end of the season, Moschetti rode as a stagiaire for Trek–Segafredo.

=== Polartec–Kometa (2018) ===
Moschetti joined UCI Continental team Polartec–Kometa for the 2018 season, and brought the team their first victory when he won stage 1 of the Tour of Antalya. His success continued, winning stage 4 of the same race, the International Rhodes Grand Prix a week later, and stage 2 of the International Tour of Rhodes. During the Tour de Normandie, a French stage race, Moschetti won stages 4 and 7, ultimately finishing second overall in the points classification. After his success in the Tour de Normandie, Moschetti signed a 2-year contract with UCI WorldTeam Trek–Segafredo, for the 2019 and 2020 season. As he did in 2017, Moschetti rode as a stagiaire with Trek–Segafredo at the end of the 2018 season.

=== Trek–Segafredo (2019–2022) ===
In May 2019, he was named in the startlist for the 2019 Giro d'Italia, his first Grand Tour, but failed to finish. In October 2020, he was named in the startlist for the 2020 Vuelta a España.

== Major results ==
2014
1st Team pursuit, National Track Championships
2017
1st Road race, National Under-23 Road Championships
2018 (2 pro wins)
1st ZLM Tour
1st International Rhodes Grand Prix
Tour of Antalya

1st Points classification
1st Stages 1 & 4

Tour de Normandie

1st Stages 4 & 7

1st Stage 2 Vuelta a Burgos
1st Stage 2 Tour de Hongrie
1st Stage 2 Tour of Rhodes
2019
4th Grand Prix de Denain
10th Scheldeprijs
2020 (2)
1st Trofeo Campos, Porreres, Felanitx, Ses Salines
1st Trofeo de Playa de Palma-Palma
2021 (1)
1st Per sempre Alfredo
4th Kampioenschap van Vlaanderen
2022 (2)
1st Stage 4 Volta a la Comunitat Valenciana
1st Stage 2 International Tour of Hellas
9th Trofeo Playa de Palma
2023 (2)
1st Clásica de Almería
1st Grand Prix d'Isbergues
3rd Grand Prix de Fourmies
5th Milano–Torino
5th Veenendaal–Veenendaal Classic
5th Kampioenschap van Vlaanderen
2024
2nd Clásica de Almería
4th Veenendaal–Veenendaal
5th Brussels Cycling Classic
6th Ronde van Limburg
8th Scheldeprijs
2025 (5)
1st Grand Prix Criquielion
International Tour of Hellas

1st Stages 1 & 5

1st Stage 2 Vuelta a Burgos
1st Stage 5 AlUla Tour
2nd Nokere Koerse
3rd Scheldeprijs
5th Ronde van Limburg
5th Grand Prix d'Isbergues
7th Münsterland Giro
2026 (1)
1st Veenendaal–Veenendaal
2nd Grand Prix d'Isbergues
3rd Famenne Ardenne Classic
3rd Hong Kong Cyclothon
4th Clásica de Almería
5th Grand Prix de Fourmies

=== Grand Tour general classification results timeline ===
Grand Tour	2019	2020	2021
Giro d'Italia	DNF	—	141
Tour de France	—	—	—
Vuelta a España	—	DNF	—
