= Team Polti VisitMalta =

Spanish cycling team

- The team in 2026

Team information
- UCI code: PTV
- Registered: Spain (2018–2020); Italy (2021–)
- Founded: 2018
- Discipline: Road
- Status: UCI Continental (2018–2020); UCI ProTeam (2021–)
- Bicycles: Aurum bikes
- Website: Team home page

Key personnel
- General manager: Ivan Basso; Alberto Contador; Fran Contador
- Team managers: Félix García Casas; Jesús Hernández; Sean Yates; Stefano Zanatta

Team name history
- 2018 2019 2020 2021–2023 2024 2025–: Polartec–Kometa (PLK); Kometa Cycling Team (KMT); Kometa Xstra Cycling Team (KTX); Eolo–Kometa (EOK); Polti–Kometa (PTK); Polti VisitMalta (PTV)

Team Polti VisitMalta is an Italian-registered, Spanish-based UCI ProTeam cycling team, that was founded in 2018. The team was promoted from the UCI Continental level in 2021.

Based in Pinto, Spain, and sponsored by the Fundación Contador headed by Alberto Contador, it was launched in 2018 as a UCI Continental youth formation supporting the Trek-Segafredo team. In 2021, under the patronage of the new sponsor Eolo SpA, it acquired the UCI ProTeam license, and this season it was invited for the first time to the Giro d'Italia.

The team rides Aurum Magma bikes equipped with full ENVE components and SRAM groupset.

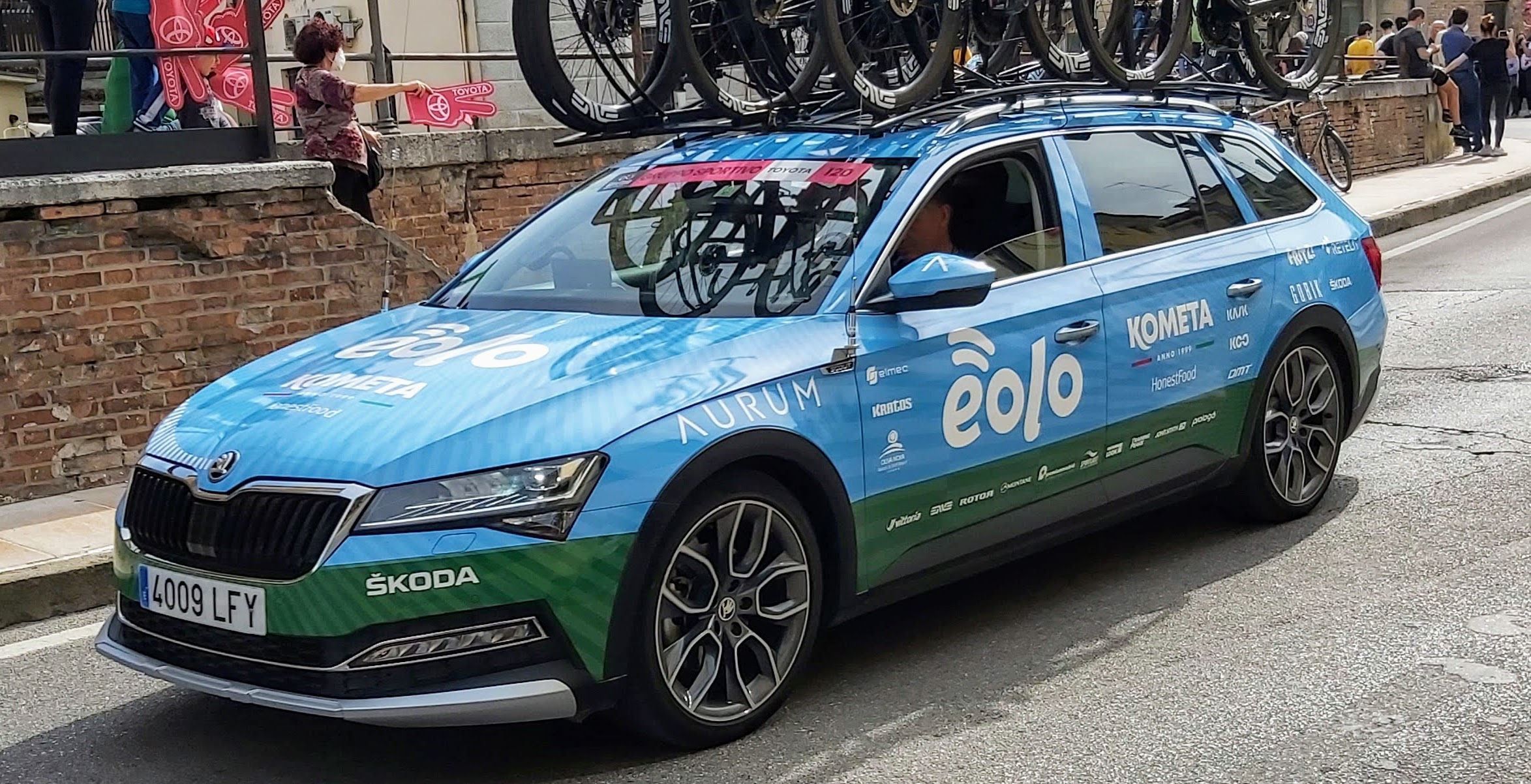
A team car

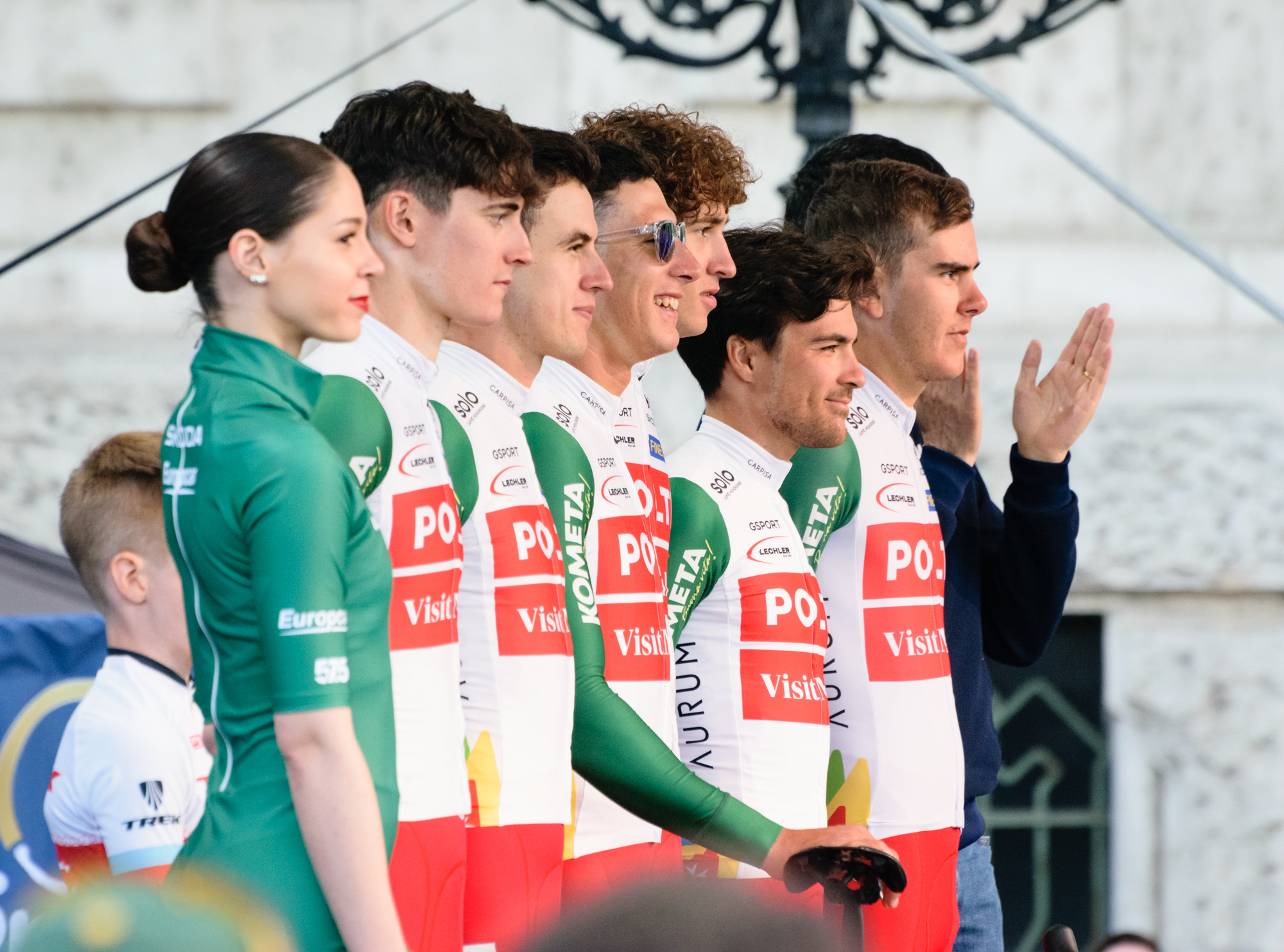
The team at the 2025 Tour de Hongrie

== Team roster ==
As of 11 January 2025.

Rider	Date of birth
Davide Bais (ITA)	2 April 1998 (age 28)
Mattia Bais (ITA)	19 October 1996 (age 29)
Aidan Buttigieg (MLT)	18 July 1997 (age 29)
Ludovico Crescioli (ITA)	20 October 2003 (age 22)
Davide De Cassan (ITA)	4 January 2002 (age 24)
Pablo García (ESP)	16 January 2001 (age 25)
Germán Darío Gómez (COL)	8 March 2001 (age 25)
Giovanni Lonardi (ITA)	9 November 1996 (age 29)
Mirco Maestri (ITA)	26 October 1991 (age 34)
Álex Martín (ESP)	25 January 2000 (age 26)

Rider	Date of birth
Francisco Muñoz (ESP)	24 June 2001 (age 25)
Manuel Peñalver (ESP)	10 December 1998 (age 27)
Andrea Pietrobon (ITA)	11 March 1999 (age 27)
Davide Piganzoli (ITA)	8 July 2002 (age 24)
Gabriele Raccagni (ITA)	5 February 2003 (age 23)
Javier Serrano (ESP)	17 April 2001 (age 25)
Diego Pablo Sevilla (ESP)	4 March 1996 (age 30)
Fernando Tercero (ESP)	28 December 2001 (age 24)
Alessandro Tonelli (ITA)	29 May 1992 (age 34)
Samuele Zoccarato (ITA)	8 January 1998 (age 28)

== Major wins ==
2018
Stages 1 & 4 Tour of Antalya, Matteo Moschetti
International Rhodes Grand Prix, Matteo Moschetti
Stage 2 International Tour of Rhodes, Matteo Moschetti
Stages 4 & 7 Tour de Normandie, Matteo Moschetti
Stage 1 Giro della Valle d'Aosta, Kevin Inkelaar
Stage 2 Vuelta a Burgos, Matteo Moschetti
Stage 2 Tour de Hongrie, Matteo Moschetti
2019
Stage 3 Giro della Valle d'Aosta, Michel Ries
Stage 4 Giro della Valle d'Aosta, Juan Pedro López
2020
Stage 1 Giro Ciclistico d'Italia, Alejandro Ropero
2021
Stage 14 Giro d'Italia, Lorenzo Fortunato
Overall Adriatica Ionica Race, Lorenzo Fortunato

Stage 2, Lorenzo Fortunato

Hungary Time Trial Championships, Erik Fetter
Stage 4 Tour du Limousin, Erik Fetter
2022
Clàssica Comunitat Valenciana 1969, Giovanni Lonardi
Hungary Time Trial Championships, Erik Fetter
Stage 4 Tour du Limousin, Vincenzo Albanese
2023
Overall Vuelta a Asturias, Lorenzo Fortunato

Stage 2, Lorenzo Fortunato

Stage 7 Giro d'Italia, Davide Bais
Stage 3a Tour Poitou-Charentes en Nouvelle-Aquitaine, Samuele Rivi
2024
Overall Tour of Antalya, Davide Piganzoli

Stage 3, Davide Piganzoli

Stage 3 Tour du Rwanda, Jhonatan Restrepo
Stage 3 Presidential Tour of Turkey, Giovanni Lonardi

== Supplementary statistics ==
Grand Tours by highest finishing position
Race	2021	2022	2023	2024
Giro d'Italia	16	15	21	13
Tour de France	—	—	—	—
Vuelta a España	—	—	—	—
Major week-long stage races by highest finishing position
Race	2021	2022	2023	2024
Tour Down Under	NH		—	—
Paris–Nice	—	—	—	—
Tirreno–Adriatico	83	18	26	18
Volta a Catalunya	—	—	—	—
Tour of the Basque Country	—	—	—	—
Tour de Romandie	—	—	—	—
Critérium du Dauphiné	—	—	—	—
Tour de Suisse	—	—	—	—
Tour de Pologne	—	—	—	—
Benelux Tour	—	NH	—	—
Monument races by highest finishing position
Monument	2021	2022	2023	2024
Milan–San Remo	—	11	58	44
Tour of Flanders	—	—	—	—
Paris–Roubaix	—	—	—	—
Liège–Bastogne–Liège	—	—	—	—
Il Lombardia	15	55	18	
Classics by highest finishing position
Classic	2021	2022	2023	2024
Omloop Het Nieuwsblad	—	—	—	—
Kuurne–Brussels–Kuurne	—	—	—	—
Strade Bianche	100	25	75	79
E3 Harelbeke	—	—	—	—
Gent–Wevelgem	—	—	—	—
Amstel Gold Race	—	—	—	—
La Flèche Wallonne	—	—	—	—
Clásica de San Sebastián	—	—	—	—

Legend
—	Did not compete
DNF	Did not finish
NH	Not held

== National champions ==
2021
Hungary Time Trial, Erik Fetter
2022
Hungary Time Trial, Erik Fetter
