= List of rosters for KRKA–Adria Mobil and its successors =

This is a list of rosters of the UCI Continental team, Adria Mobil, categorised by season.

== 2023 ==
As of 23 May 2023.

Rider	Date of birth
Đorđe Đurić (SER)	21 June 2000 (age 25)
Tilen Finkšt (SLO)	6 July 1997 (age 28)
Gal Glivar (SLO)	1 May 2002 (age 24)
Kristjan Hočevar (SLO)	3 May 1999 (age 27)
Aljaž Jarc (SLO)	9 April 1999 (age 27)

Rider	Date of birth
Dimitar Jovanoski (MKD)	6 October 2003 (age 22)
Martin Jurík (SLO)	2 October 2004 (age 21)
Kristijan Koren (SLO)	25 November 1986 (age 39)
Boštjan Murn (SLO)	15 January 2001 (age 25)
Aljaž Turk (SLO)	23 December 2004 (age 21)

== 2022 ==
As of 16 February 2022.

Rider	Date of birth
Nik Čemažar (SLO)	2 August 1999 (aged 22)
Aljaž Colnar (SLO)	16 February 2002 (aged 20)
Viktor Filutás (HUN)	28 September 1996 (aged 25)
Tilen Finkšt (SLO)	6 July 1997 (aged 24)
Gal Glivar (SLO)	1 May 2002 (aged 19)
Kristjan Hočevar (SLO)	3 May 1999 (aged 22)

Rider	Date of birth
Žiga Horvat (SLO)	13 September 1998 (aged 23)
Aljaž Jarc (SLO)	9 April 1999 (aged 22)
Kristijan Koren (SLO)	25 November 1986 (aged 35)
Boštjan Murn (SLO)	15 January 2001 (aged 21)
David Per (SLO)	13 February 1995 (aged 27)
Jaka Špoljar (SLO)	4 March 2003 (aged 18)

== 2021 ==
Ages as at 1 January 2021.

Rider	Date of birth
Aljaž Colnar (SLO)	16 February 2002 (aged 18)
Gal Glivar (SLO)	1 May 2002 (aged 18)
Kristjan Hočevar (SLO)	3 May 1999 (aged 21)
Žiga Horvat (SLO)	13 September 1998 (aged 22)
Aljaž Jarc (SLO)	9 April 1999 (aged 21)

Rider	Date of birth
Gašper Katrašnik (SLO)	20 June 1995 (aged 25)
Boštjan Murn (SLO)	15 January 2001 (aged 19)
Aljaž Omrzel (SLO)	31 December 2000 (aged 20)
David Per (SLO)	13 February 1995 (aged 25)
Žiga Piskule (SLO)	13 December 2002 (aged 18)

== 2020 ==
Ages as of 1 January 2020.

Rider	Date of birth
Janez Brajkovič (SLO)	18 December 1983 (aged 36)
Kristjan Hočevar (SLO)	3 May 1999 (aged 20)
Žiga Horvat (SLO)	13 September 1998 (aged 21)
Aljaž Jarc (SLO)	9 April 1999 (aged 20)
Gašper Katrašnik (SLO)	20 June 1995 (aged 24)
Marko Kump (SLO)	9 September 1988 (aged 31)

Rider	Date of birth
Boštjan Murn (SLO)	15 January 2001 (aged 18)
Aljaž Omrzel (SLO)	31 December 2000 (aged 19)
David Per (SLO)	13 February 1995 (aged 24)
Gorazd Per (SLO)	5 March 1997 (aged 22)
Radoslav Rogina (CRO)	3 March 1979 (aged 40)

== 2019 ==
Ages as of 1 January 2019.

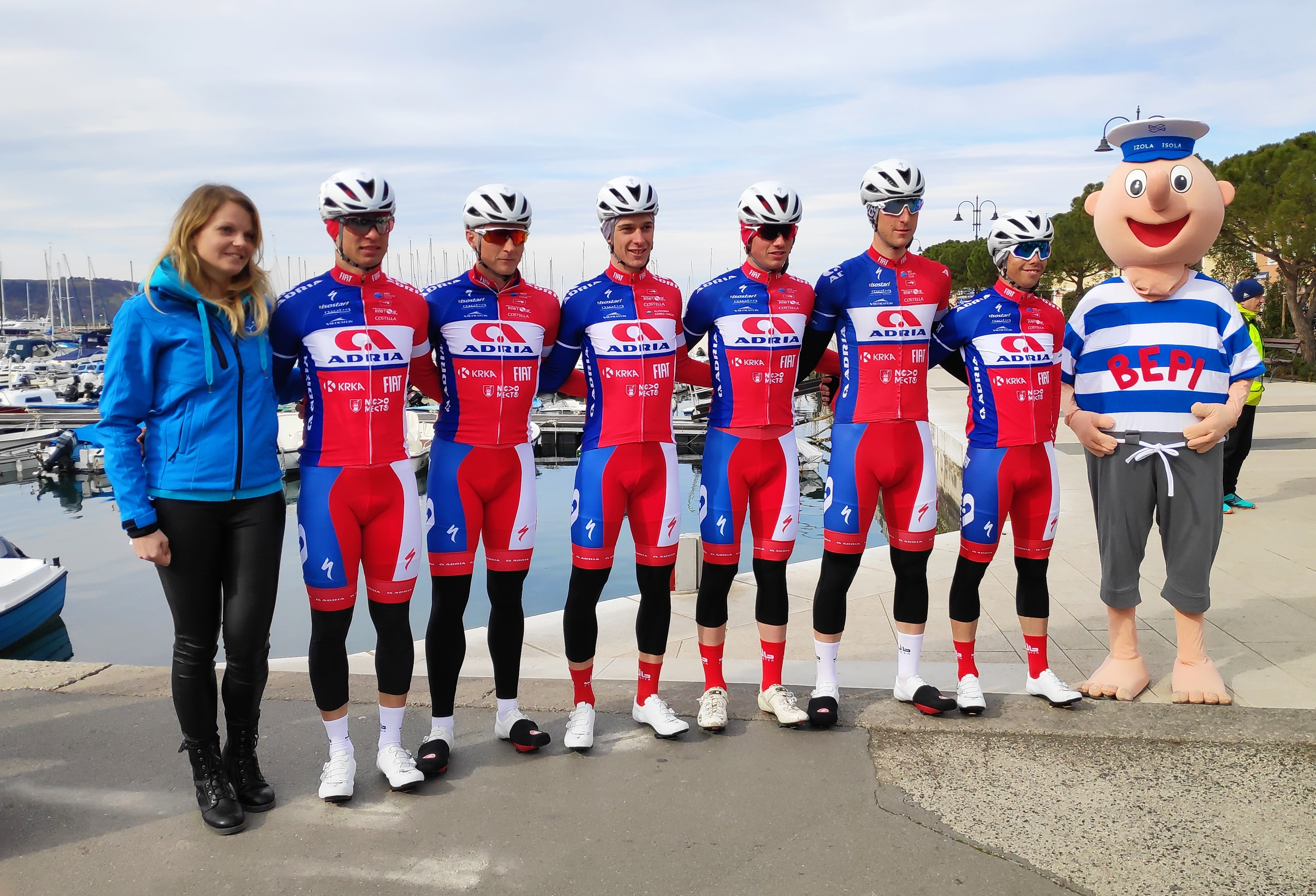
Part of 2019 roster (2019 GP Izola)

Rider	Date of birth
Jon Božič (SLO)	11 November 1996 (aged 22)
Janez Brajkovič (SLO)	18 December 1983 (aged 35)
Žiga Grošelj (SLO)	31 August 1993 (aged 25)
Žiga Horvat (SLO)	13 September 1998 (aged 20)
Aljaž Jarc (SLO)	9 April 1999 (aged 19)
Gašper Katrašnik (SLO)	20 June 1995 (aged 23)

Rider	Date of birth
Marko Kump (SLO)	9 September 1988 (aged 30)
Aljaž Omrzel (SLO)	31 December 2000 (aged 18)
David Per (SLO)	13 February 1995 (aged 23)
Gorazd Per (SLO)	5 March 1997 (aged 21)
Dušan Rajović (SRB)	19 November 1997 (aged 21)
Radoslav Rogina (CRO)	3 March 1979 (aged 39)

== 2018 ==
As of 1 September 2018.

Rider	Date of birth
Saad Alsaadi (BHN)	19 November 1998 (aged 19)
Jon Božič (SLO)	11 November 1996 (aged 21)
Janez Brajkovič (SLO)	18 December 1983 (aged 34)
Gregor Gazvoda (SLO)	15 October 1981 (aged 36)
Jure Golčer (SLO)	12 July 1977 (aged 40)
Žiga Grošelj (SLO)	31 August 1993 (aged 24)

Rider	Date of birth
Žiga Horvat (SLO)	13 September 1998 (aged 19)
Aljaz Jarc (SLO)	9 April 1999 (aged 18)
Gašper Katrašnik (SLO)	20 June 1995 (aged 22)
Gorazd Per (SLO)	5 March 1997 (aged 20)
Dušan Rajović (SRB)	19 November 1997 (aged 20)
Radoslav Rogina (CRO)	3 March 1979 (aged 38)
Josip Rumac (CRO)	26 October 1994 (aged 23)

== 2017 ==
Ages as at 1 January 2017.

Rider	Date of birth
Andrea Borso (ITA)	29 December 1994 (aged 22)
Jon Božič (SLO)	11 November 1996 (aged 20)
Gregor Gazvoda (SLO)	15 October 1981 (aged 35)
Jure Golčer (SLO)	12 July 1977 (aged 39)
Žiga Grošelj (SLO)	31 August 1993 (aged 23)

Rider	Date of birth
Žiga Horvat (SLO)	13 September 1998 (aged 18)
Gašper Katrašnik (SLO)	20 June 1995 (aged 21)
Gorazd Per (SLO)	5 March 1997 (aged 19)
Dušan Rajović (SRB)	19 November 1997 (aged 19)
Radoslav Rogina (CRO)	3 March 1979 (aged 37)

== 2016 ==
As of 29 February 2016.

Rider	Date of birth
Jon Božič (SLO)	11 November 1996 (aged 19)
Matej Drinovec (SLO)	16 August 1991 (aged 24)
Kristjan Fajt (SLO)	7 May 1982 (aged 33)
Jure Golčer (SLO)	7 December 1977 (aged 38)
Gašper Katrašnik (SLO)	20 June 1995 (aged 20)

Rider	Date of birth
Matej Mesojedec (SLO)	15 March 1997 (aged 18)
Domen Novak (SLO)	12 July 1995 (aged 20)
David Per (SLO)	13 February 1995 (aged 20)
Gorazd Per (SLO)	5 March 1997 (aged 18)
Radoslav Rogina (CRO)	3 March 1979 (aged 36)

== 2015 ==
Ages as at 1 January 2015.

Rider	Date of birth
Jon Božič (SLO)	11 November 1996 (aged 18)
Kristjan Fajt (SLO)	7 May 1982 (aged 32)
Marko Kump (SLO)	9 September 1988 (aged 26)
Domen Novak (SLO)	12 July 1995 (aged 19)
David Per (SLO)	13 February 1995 (aged 19)

Rider	Date of birth
Radoslav Rogina (CRO)	3 March 1979 (aged 35)
Primož Roglič (SLO)	29 October 1989 (aged 25)
Josip Rumac (CRO)	26 October 1994 (aged 20)
Klemen Štimulak (SLO)	20 July 1990 (aged 24)

== 2014 ==
Ages as at 1 January 2014.

Rider	Date of birth
Kristjan Fajt (SLO)	7 May 1982 (aged 31)
Pavel Gorenc (SLO)	15 July 1991 (aged 22)
Aljaž Hočevar (SLO)	20 August 1991 (aged 22)
Bruno Maltar (CRO)	6 October 1994 (aged 19)
Matej Mugerli (SLO)	17 June 1981 (aged 32)

Rider	Date of birth
Tomasz Nose (SLO)	21 April 1982 (aged 31)
Simon Pavlin (SLO)	15 May 1992 (aged 21)
Radoslav Rogina (CRO)	3 March 1979 (aged 34)
Primož Roglič (SLO)	29 October 1989 (aged 24)
Klemen Štimulak (SLO)	20 July 1990 (aged 23)

== 2013 ==
Ages as at 1 January 2013.

Rider	Date of birth
Kristjan Fajt (SLO)	7 May 1982 (aged 30)
Pavel Gorenc (SLO)	15 July 1991 (aged 21)
Aljaž Hočevar (SLO)	20 August 1991 (aged 21)
Bruno Maltar (CRO)	6 October 1994 (aged 18)
Matej Mugerli (SLO)	17 June 1981 (aged 31)

Rider	Date of birth
Tomasz Nose (SLO)	21 April 1982 (aged 30)
Simon Pavlin (SLO)	15 May 1992 (aged 20)
Radoslav Rogina (CRO)	3 March 1979 (aged 33)
Primož Roglič (SLO)	29 October 1989 (aged 23)
Klemen Štimulak (SLO)	20 July 1990 (aged 22)

== 2012 ==
Ages as at 1 January 2012.

Rider	Date of birth
Kristijan Đurasek (CRO)	26 July 1987 (aged 24)
Kristjan Fajt (SLO)	7 May 1982 (aged 29)
Matej Gnezda (SLO)	12 January 1979 (aged 32)
Pavel Gorenc (SLO)	15 July 1991 (aged 20)
Aljaž Hočevar (SLO)	20 August 1991 (aged 20)
Marko Kump (SLO)	9 September 1988 (aged 23)

Rider	Date of birth
Matej Mugerli (SLO)	17 June 1981 (aged 30)
Tomasz Nose (SLO)	21 April 1982 (aged 29)
Simon Pavlin (SLO)	15 May 1992 (aged 19)
Radoslav Rogina (CRO)	3 March 1979 (aged 32)
Primož Šegina (SLO)	11 January 1985 (aged 26)

== 2011 ==
Ages as at 1 January 2011.

Rider	Date of birth
Kristjan Fajt (SLO)	May 7, 1982 (aged 28)
Blaž Furdi (SLO)	May 27, 1988 (aged 22)
Matej Gnežda (SLO)	January 12, 1979 (aged 31)
Pavel Gorenc (SLO)	July 15, 1991 (aged 19)
Marco Haller (AUT)	April 1, 1991 (aged 19)
Aljaž Hočevar (SLO)	August 20, 1991 (aged 19)

Rider	Date of birth
Blaž Jarc (SLO)	July 17, 1988 (aged 22)
Mitja Mahorič (SLO)	May 12, 1976 (aged 34)
Tomaž Nose (SLO)	April 21, 1982 (aged 28)
Primož Šegina (SLO)	January 11, 1985 (aged 25)
Jure Žagar (SLO)	February 23, 1987 (aged 23)

== 2010 ==
Ages as at 1 January 2010.

Rider	Date of birth
Kristjan Fajt (SLO)	May 7, 1982 (aged 27)
Matej Gnezda (SLO)	January 12, 1979 (aged 30)
Pavel Gorenc (SLO)	July 15, 1991 (aged 18)
Aljaž Hočevar (SLO)	August 20, 1991 (aged 18)
Blaž Jarc (SLO)	July 17, 1988 (aged 21)
Marko Kump (SLO)	September 9, 1988 (aged 21)

Rider	Date of birth
Mitja Mahorič (SLO)	May 12, 1976 (aged 33)
Uroš Murn (SLO)	February 9, 1975 (aged 34)
Jani Musič (SLO)	January 12, 1991 (aged 18)
Tomaž Nose (SLO)	April 21, 1982 (aged 27)
Marino Palandri (ITA)	November 30, 1985 (aged 24)
Jure Žagar (SLO)	February 23, 1987 (aged 22)

== 2009 ==
Ages as at 1 January 2009.

Rider	Date of birth
Grega Bole (SLO)	13 August 1985 (aged 23)
Benjamin Cujnik (SLO)	24 April 1988 (aged 20)
Kristjan Fajt (SLO)	May 7, 1982 (aged 26)
Matej Gnezda (SLO)	January 12, 1979 (aged 29)
Blaž Jarc (SLO)	17 July 1988 (aged 20)
Marko Kump (SLO)	9 September 1988 (aged 20)

Rider	Date of birth
Uroš Murn (SLO)	9 February 1975 (aged 33)
Tomaž Nose (SLO)	21 April 1982 (aged 26)
Alessio Signego (ITA)	11 December 1983 (aged 25)
Miha Švab (SLO)	20 April 1984 (aged 24)
Robert Vrečer (SLO)	8 October 1980 (aged 28)
Jure Žagar (SLO)	27 February 1987 (aged 21)
Jure Zrimšek (SLO)	20 January 1982 (aged 26)

== 2008 ==
Ages as at 1 January 2008.

Rider	Date of birth
Grega Bole (SLO)	13 August 1985 (aged 22)
Benjamin Cujnik (SLO)	24 April 1988 (aged 19)
Rok Grlič (SLO)	13 February 1989 (aged 18)
Blaž Jarc (SLO)	17 July 1988 (aged 19)
Robert Kišerlovski (CRO)	9 August 1986 (aged 21)
Marko Kump (SLO)	9 September 1988 (aged 19)

Rider	Date of birth
Uroš Murn (SLO)	9 February 1975 (aged 32)
Tomaž Nose (SLO)	21 April 1982 (aged 25)
Jože Senekovič (SLO)	12 March 1986 (aged 21)
Miha Švab (SLO)	20 April 1984 (aged 23)
Jure Žagar (SLO)	27 February 1987 (aged 20)
Jure Zrimšek (SLO)	20 January 1982 (aged 25)

== 2007 ==
Ages as at 1 January 2007.

Rider	Date of birth
Benjamin Cujnik (SLO)	24 April 1988 (aged 18)
Blaž Furdi (SLO)	27 May 1988 (aged 18)
Blaž Jarc (SLO)	17 July 1988 (aged 18)
Robert Kišerlovski (CRO)	9 August 1986 (aged 20)
Marko Kump (SLO)	9 September 1988 (aged 18)
Tomaž Nose (SLO)	21 April 1982 (aged 24)

Rider	Date of birth
Joze Senekovič (SLO)	12 March 1986 (aged 20)
Simon Špilak (SLO)	23 June 1986 (aged 20)
Miha Švab (SLO)	20 April 1984 (aged 22)
Jure Žagar (SLO)	27 February 1987 (aged 19)
Tine Žagar (SLO)	27 August 1988 (aged 18)
Jure Zrimšek (SLO)	20 January 1982 (aged 24)

== 2006 ==
Ages as at 1 January 2006.

Rider	Date of birth
Sašo Barantin (SLO)	19 March 1986 (aged 19)
Bruno Bertolini (ITA)	10 June 1981 (aged 24)
Robert Kišerlovski (CRO)	9 August 1986 (aged 19)
Zoran Klemenčič (SLO)	28 April 1976 (aged 29)
Luka Kodra (SLO)	16 January 1986 (aged 19)
Tomaž Nose (SLO)	21 April 1982 (aged 23)
Jože Senekovič (SLO)	12 March 1986 (aged 19)

Rider	Date of birth
Miha Šolar (SLO)	15 March 1982 (aged 23)
Simon Špilak (SLO)	23 June 1986 (aged 19)
Miha Švab (SLO)	20 April 1984 (aged 21)
Jure Žagar (SLO)	27 February 1987 (aged 18)
Matej Zorko (SLO)	1 April 1982 (aged 23)
Simon Zupančič (SLO)	25 November 1986 (aged 19)

== 2005 ==
Ages as at 1 January 2005.

Rider	Date of birth
Sašo Barantin (SLO)	19 March 1986 (aged 18)
Janez Brajkovič (SLO)	18 December 1983 (aged 21)
Jure Bregar (SLO)	5 April 1985 (aged 19)
Robert Kišerlovski (CRO)	9 August 1986 (aged 18)
Bogdan Muška (SLO)	18 December 1986 (aged 18)
Vid Ogris (SLO)	3 January 1985 (aged 19)

Rider	Date of birth
Primož Šegina (SLO)	11 January 1985 (aged 19)
Simon Špilak (SLO)	23 June 1986 (aged 18)
Miha Švab (SLO)	20 April 1984 (aged 20)
Matej Zorko (SLO)	1 April 1982 (aged 22)
Simon Zupančič (SLO)	25 November 1986 (aged 18)
