= Croatian National Time Trial Championships =

Croatian road cycling championship

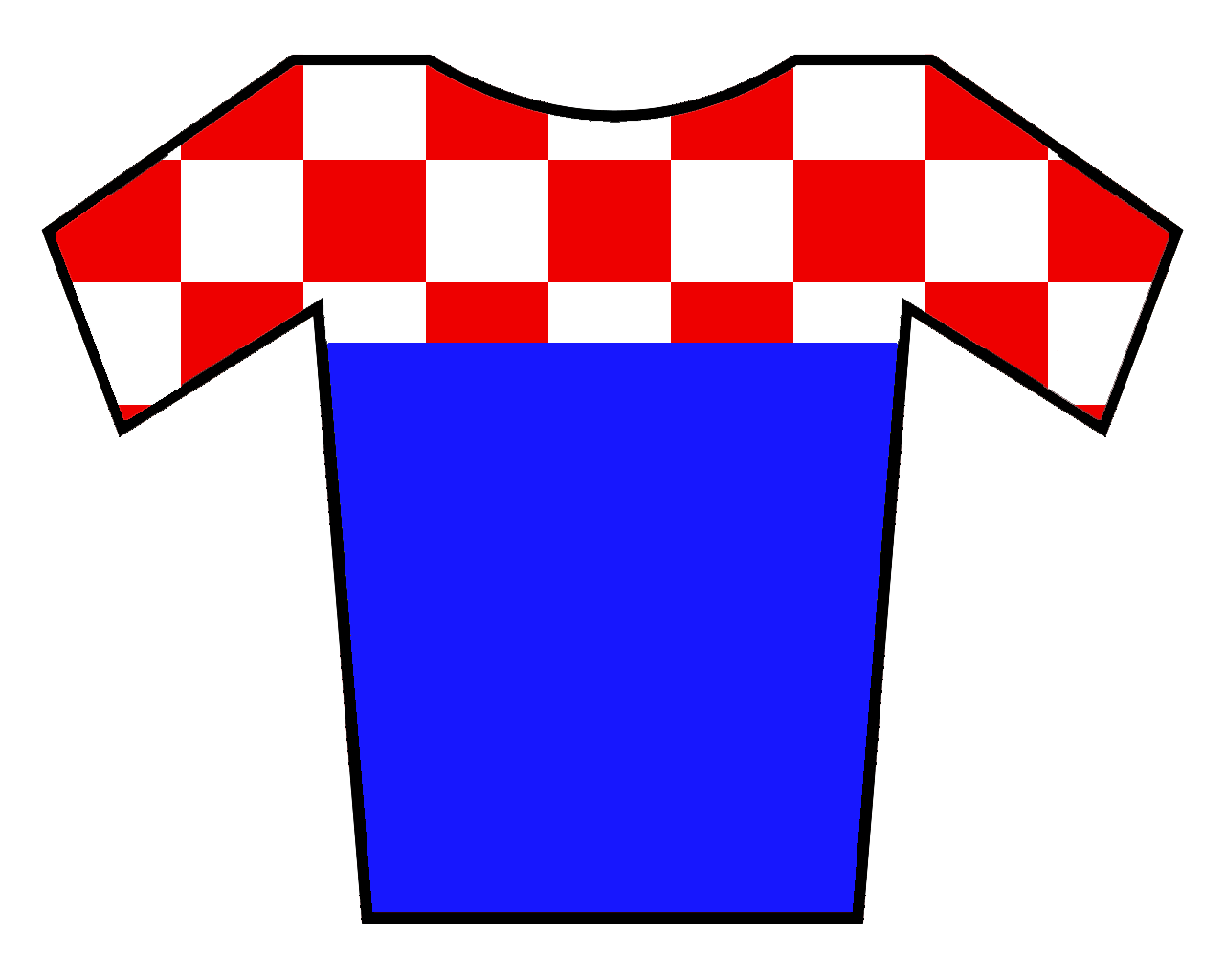
The champion's jersey

The Croatian National Time Trial Championships is a cycling race where the Croatian cyclists decide who will become the champion for the year to come.

== Men ==
=== Elite ===
Year	Gold	Silver	Bronze
1997	Luka Bakrac	Martin Cotar	Dino Zuban
1998	Luka Bakrac	Hrvoje Bosnjak	Dino Zuban
1999	Martin Cotar	Vladimir Miholjević	Hrvoje Bosnjak
2000	Martin Cotar	Vladimir Miholjević	Radoslav Rogina
2001	Martin Cotar	Vladimir Miholjević	David Demanuele
2002	Martin Cotar	Radoslav Rogina	Hrvoje Bosnjak
2003	Radoslav Rogina	Tomislav Dančulović	Massimo Demarin
2004	Matija Kvasina	Radoslav Rogina	David Demanuele
2005	Martin Cotar	Luka Kakrac	David Demanuele
2006	Matija Kvasina	David Demanuele	Bruno Radotić
2007	Matija Kvasina	Kristijan Đurasek	David Demanuele
2008	Matija Kvasina	Bruno Radotić	Martin Cotar
2009	Bruno Radotić	Luka Grubić	David Demanuele
2010	Matija Kvasina	Bruno Radotić	Bojan Rafaj
2011	Kristijan Đurasek	Matija Kvasina	Bruno Radotić
2012	Vladimir Miholjević	Kristijan Đurasek	Matija Kvasina
2013	Matija Kvasina	Massimo Demarin	Tomislav Petrovic
2014	Bruno Maltar	Josip Rumac	Emanuel Kišerlovski
2015	Matija Kvasina	Bruno Maltar	Bojan Gunjević
2016	Matija Kvasina	Mijo Bebić	Tomislav Mijatović
2017 (Note: The race was initially won by Matija Kvasina, but this result was later expunged following his positive doping test at the 2017 Flèche du Sud.)	Bruno Radotić	Bojan Gunjević	Tomislav Mijatović
2018	Josip Rumac	Bojan Gunjević	Mijo Bebić
2019	Josip Rumac	Bojan Gunjević	Tomislav Mijatović
2020	Josip Rumac	Eugen Popović	Mijo Bebić
2021	Toni Stojanov	Lorenzo Marenzi	Josip Bugarija
2022	Fran Miholjević	Viktor Potočki	Antonio Barać
2023	Fran Miholjević	Antonio Barać	Ivan Marojevic
2024	Nicolas Gojkovic	Ian Peran	Tomislav Mijatović

=== U23 ===
Year	Gold	Silver	Bronze
2015	Bruno Maltar	Pavel Potocki	—N/a
2016	Bruno Maltar	Josip Rumac	Toni Stojanov
2017	David Jabuka	Antonio Barać	Filip Kvasina
2018	David Jabuka	Antonio Barać	Viktor Potočki
2019	Viktor Potočki	Filip Kvasina	Dario Dovranić
2020	Viktor Potočki	Filip Kvasina	Carlo Jurišević
2021	Fran Miholjević	Carlo Jurišević	Viktor Potočki
2022	Fran Miholjević	Carlo Jurišević	—N/a

== Women ==
Year	Gold	Silver	Bronze
2007	Ivana Ruszkowski	Jelena Gracin	Kristina Skevin
2008	Viena Balen	Maja Marukic	Marina Boduljak
2009	Mia Radotić	Maja Marukic	Marina Boduljak
2010	Jelena Gracin	Wanda Svrakic	Antonela Ferenčić
2011	Mia Radotić	Daria Pletikapa	Jelena Gracin
2012	Mia Radotić	Antonela Ferenčić	Mira Mocan
2013	Mia Radotić	Wanda Svrakic	Diana Vrdoljak
2014	Mia Radotić	Wanda Svrakic	Diana Vrdoljak
2015	Mia Radotić	Diana Vrdoljak	Antonela Ferenčić
2016	Mia Radotić	Diana Vrdoljak	Nataša Šustić
2017	Mia Radotić	Nataša Šustić	—N/a
2018	Mia Radotić	Maja Perinović	Maja Bonačić
2019	Mia Radotić	Maja Perinović	Maja Bonačić
2020	Mia Radotić	Maja Perinović	Mateja Posavec
2021	Mia Radotić	Maja Marukic	Alessandra Musa
2022	Mia Radotić	Andrea Heged	Gloria Musa
2023	Mia Radotić	Andrea Heged	Pernjak Zlatica
2024	Majda Horvat	Mia Radotić	Kristina Koter

== See also ==
- Croatian National Road Race Championships
- National road cycling championships
