= Matija Kvasina =

Croatian cyclist

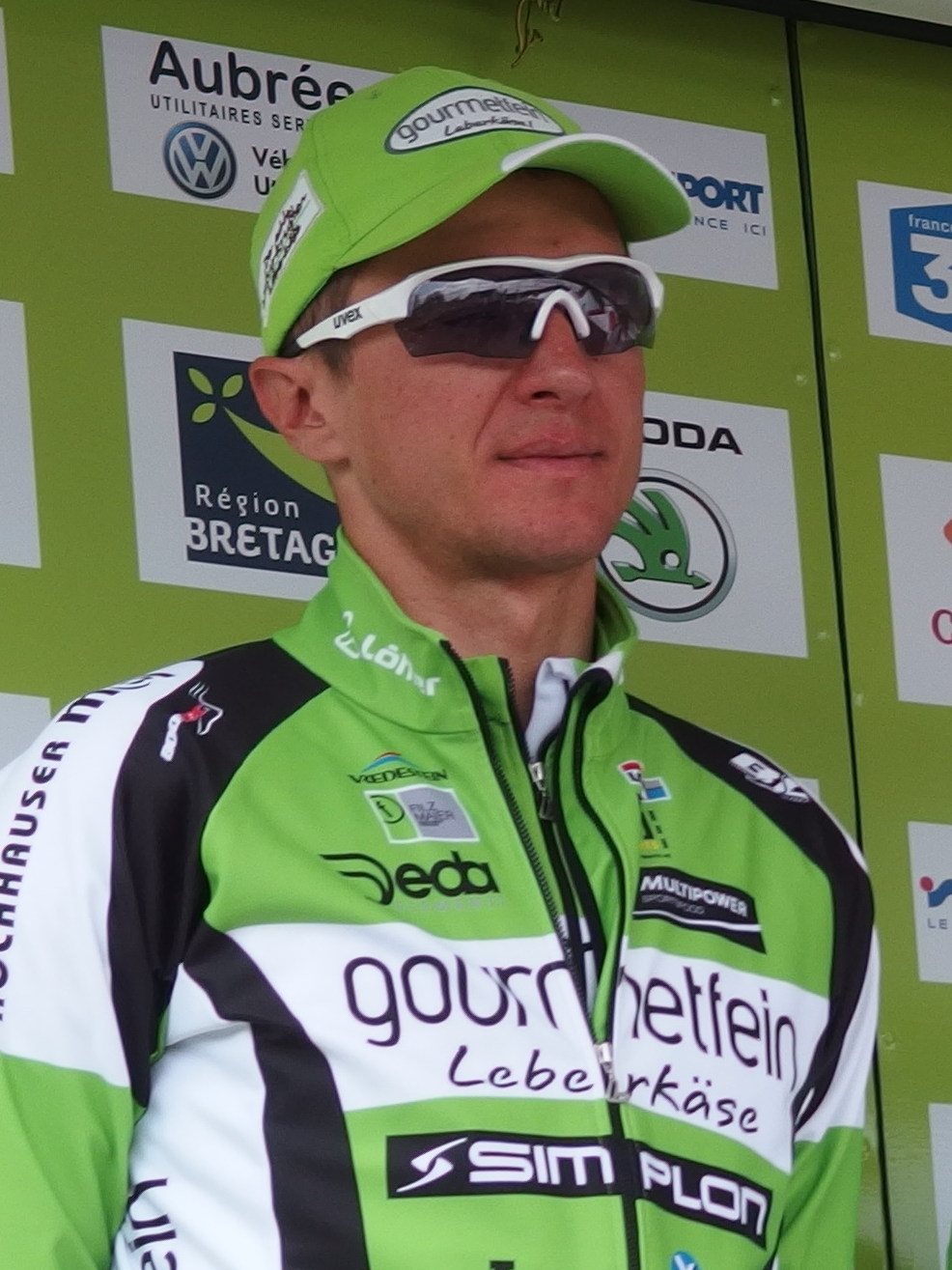
- Kvasina in 2014

Personal information
- Full name: Matija Kvasina
- Born: 4 December 1981 (age 44) Nova Gradiška, SFR Yugoslavia (now Croatia)
- Height: 180 cm (5 ft 11 in)
- Weight: 72 kg (159 lb)

Cycling career
- Sport: Cycling
- Discipline: Road
- Role: Rider

Professional teams
- 2004–2008: Perutnina Ptuj
- 2009: Amica Chips–Knauf
- 2009: Loborika
- 2010: Zheroquadro–Radenska
- 2010–2012: Loborika
- 2012: Tuşnad Cycling Team
- 2013–2015: Gourmetfein–Simplon
- 2016: Synergy Baku
- 2017: Team Felbermayr–Simplon Wels

Major wins
- Stage races Rhône-Alpes Isère Tour (2014) Tour of Croatia (2016) Single-day races and Classics National Time Trial Championships (2004, 2006–2008, 2013, 2015–2016) National Road Race Championships (2005)

Matija Kvasina (born 4 December 1981) is a Croatian racing cyclist, who most recently rode for UCI Continental team Team Felbermayr–Simplon Wels. He finished 56th in the road race and 38th in the road time trial at the 2008 Summer Olympics in Beijing. In 2017, Kvasina was given a four-year doping suspension after a positive drugs test at that year's Flèche du Sud.

== Career ==
Born in Nova Gradiška, Kvasina was named by Synergy Baku as part of their squad for the 2016 season.

In 2016, he won the overall title at the Tour of Croatia.

== Doping ==
Kvasina tested positive for an experimental drug known as Molidustat (BAY-85-3934), during two tests taken during the 2017 Flèche du Sud - a race in which he won. Molidustat represents a class of drugs that act on the same physiological pathways and enzyme cascades as those which are activated during altitude training. Oxygen deprivation has the effect of stimulating the body's production of erythropoietin (EPO) - Molidustat imitates this. Kvasina was subsequently kicked out of the 2017 Tour of Austria.

In oxygen poor environments the human body manufactures a protein called hypoxia-inducible factor (HIF), which initiates and drives the processes which allow the body to adapt to those low-oxygen conditions. Typically this involves increasing the concentrations of naturally made EPO, mobilising iron and an increase in the rate of red blood cell production. Under normal oxygen environmental conditions, HIF is kept in check (its actions are inhibited) by an enzyme called prolyl hydroxylase (PH). Moldustat stops PH from blocking HIF, thus, increasing both the concentrations of EPO and red blood cells in the body, imitating altitude training.

== Major results ==
2002
4th Trofeo Alcide Degasperi
10th Overall GP Kranj
2003
6th Overall Jadranska Magistrala
7th GP Istria 3
8th Trofeo Alcide Degasperi
2004
1st Time trial, National Road Championships
6th Overall Tour of Slovenia
7th Overall Tour de l'Avenir
2005
1st Road race, National Road Championships
1st Overall Tour de Serbie

1st Stage 2

4th Tour de Berne
6th Giro del Belvedere
8th Overall Tour de l'Avenir
8th Poreč Trophy
10th Overall Tour of Slovenia
2006
1st Time trial, National Road Championships
2nd Overall Vuelta a Cuba

1st Stage 11a (ITT)

3rd Overall Rhône-Alpes Isère Tour
4th Overall Tour de Serbie
4th GP Triberg-Schwarzwald
5th Overall Tour of Slovenia
6th Overall Tour de l'Avenir
9th Overall Regio-Tour
10th Overall Circuit des Ardennes
2007
National Road Championships

1st Time trial
3rd Road race

1st Stage 2 Course de la Solidarité Olympique
2nd GP Triberg-Schwarzwald
3rd Overall Tour de Serbie
3rd Giro del Belvedere
6th Overall Tour of Slovenia
6th Rund um die Hainleite
10th Sparkassen Giro Bochum
2008
1st Time trial, National Road Championships
1st Overall Tour de Serbie
2nd Trofeo Zsšdi
2nd Ljubljana–Zagreb
8th Overall Tour of Slovenia
10th Overall Istrian Spring Trophy
2009
2nd Giro Valli Aretine
3rd Overall Grand Prix Cycliste de Gemenc
6th Overall Tour of Slovenia
2010
4th Trofeo Internazionale Bastianelli
9th Giro del Veneto
10th Overall Course de la Solidarité Olympique
2011
1st Banja Luka–Belgrade II
1st Central European Tour Miskolc GP
National Road Championships

2nd Time trial
3rd Road race

6th Overall Tour of Bulgaria
6th Trofeo Avis
8th Overall Tour of Slovenia
2012
1st Overall Tour of Romania

1st Stage 5

2nd Overall Sibiu Cycling Tour
3rd Time trial, National Road Championships
4th Overall Tour of Szeklerland

1st Mountains classification
1st Stages 3 & 4 (ITT)

4th Central European Tour Miskolc GP
5th Overall Tour de Serbie
8th Overall Istrian Spring Trophy
2013
1st Time trial, National Road Championships
2nd Overall Sibiu Cycling Tour
3rd Overall Okolo Jižních Čech

1st Stage 3

4th Raiffeisen Grand Prix
8th Overall Giro della Regione Friuli Venezia Giulia
9th Overall Istrian Spring Trophy

1st Mountains classification

10th Overall Tour of Austria
2014
1st Overall Rhône-Alpes Isère Tour
1st Mountains classification Circuit des Ardennes
2nd Trofej Umag
3rd Road race, National Road Championships
3rd Overall Okolo Slovenska
5th Overall Tour de Bretagne
6th Tour de Berne
2015
National Road Championships

1st Time trial
3rd Road race

3rd Overall Settimana Internazionale di Coppi e Bartali
9th Overall Rhône-Alpes Isère Tour
9th Overall Czech Cycling Tour
2016
1st Time trial, National Road Championships
1st Overall Tour of Croatia
3rd Overall Tour de Serbie
8th Overall Tour d'Azerbaïdjan
9th Poreč Trophy
2017
~~National Road Championships~~

~~1st Time trial~~
~~2nd Road race~~

~~1st Overall Flèche du Sud~~
7th Overall Rhône-Alpes Isère Tour

1st Mountains classification
