= Bruno Radotić =

Croatian bicycle racer

Personal information
- Full name: Bruno Radotić
- Born: 28 June 1983 (age 43) Zagreb, Croatia

Cycling career
- Sport: Cycling
- Current team: BK Roda
- Disciplines: Road; Cyclo-cross
- Role: Rider
- Rider type: Time-trialist

Amateur team
- 2018–: BK Roda

Professional team
- 2010–2012: Meridiana–Kamen

Bruno Radotić (born 28 June 1983 in Zagreb) is a Croatian cyclist. He is the brother of Mia Radotić.

== Major results ==
2006
3rd Time trial, National Road Championships
2008
2nd Time trial, National Road Championships
2009
1st Time trial, National Road Championships
2010
2nd Time trial, National Road Championships
2011
3rd Time trial, National Road Championships
2017
National Road Championships

2nd Time trial
3rd Road race
