= Hrvoje Miholjević =

Croatian cyclist

Personal information
- Born: 8 June 1979 (age 47) Zagreb, Croatia

Cycling career
- Sport: Cycling
- Current team: Retired
- Discipline: Road
- Role: Rider

Professional teams
- 2005–2006: Perutnina Ptuj
- 2009–2012: Loborika

Hrvoje Miholjević (born 8 June 1979) is a Croatian former cyclist.

== Palmares ==
2001
1st National Road Race Championships
2nd GP Kranj
2nd Tour de Serbie
3rd Tour of Croatia
2002
1st Poreč Trophy 5
2003
2nd National Road Race Championships
2004
2nd Giro del Friuli Venezia Giulia
2005
2nd Paths of King Nikola
2nd Tour de Serbie
3rd Istrian Spring Trophy
3rd National Road Race Championships
2006
1st National Road Race Championships
3rd GP Triberg-Schwarzwald
2007
1st Coppa San Geo
1st GP Capodarco
2nd Giro del Belvedere
3rd Istrian Spring Trophy
2008
1st Giro del Friuli Venezia Giulia

1st Stage 4

2nd Piccolo Giro di Lombardia
5th Ljubljana-Zagreb
8th The Paths of King Nikola
2009
2nd Ljubljana-Zagreb
3rd Poreč Trophy
6th The Paths of King Nikola
8th Praha-Karlovy Vary-Praha
10th Istrian Spring Trophy
2010
1st GP Betonexpressz 2000
4th GP Kranj
7th Gran Premio Folignano
9th Trofeo Zsšdi
2011
3rd Gran Premio Folignano
5th Banja Luka-Belgrade II
9th National Road Race Championships
