= Massimo Demarin =

Croatian bicycle racer

Personal information
- Full name: Massimo Demarin
- Born: 25 August 1979 (age 47): Pula, SR Croatia, Yugoslavia; (now Croatia)

Cycling career
- Sport: Cycling
- Current team: Retired
- Discipline: Road
- Role: Rider, Climber

Amateur teams
- 1999: Kamen Pazin
- 2000: KRKA Telekom U23
- 2001: Perutnina Ptuj
- 2002: HiT Casino Nova Gorica

Professional teams
- 2003–2006: Perutnina Ptuj
- 2007–2008: Sava
- 2009–2012: Loborika
- 2013–2014: Meridiana–Kamen

Massimo Demarin (born 25 August 1979 in Pula) is a Croatian former professional cyclist.

== Major results ==
1999
1st Stage 5, Tour of Croatia
2002
1st Road race, National Road Championships
1st Stage 2 Jadranska Magistrala

4th Overall Tour of Slovenia

2003
National Road Championships

3rd Road race
3rd Time trial

4th Overall Tour of Slovenia

2004
1st Overall The Paths of King Nikola

1st Stage 2

3rd Road race, National Road Championships
2006
2nd Road race, National Road Championships
2013
2nd Time trial, National Road Championships
