= Vladimir Miholjević =

Croatian cyclist

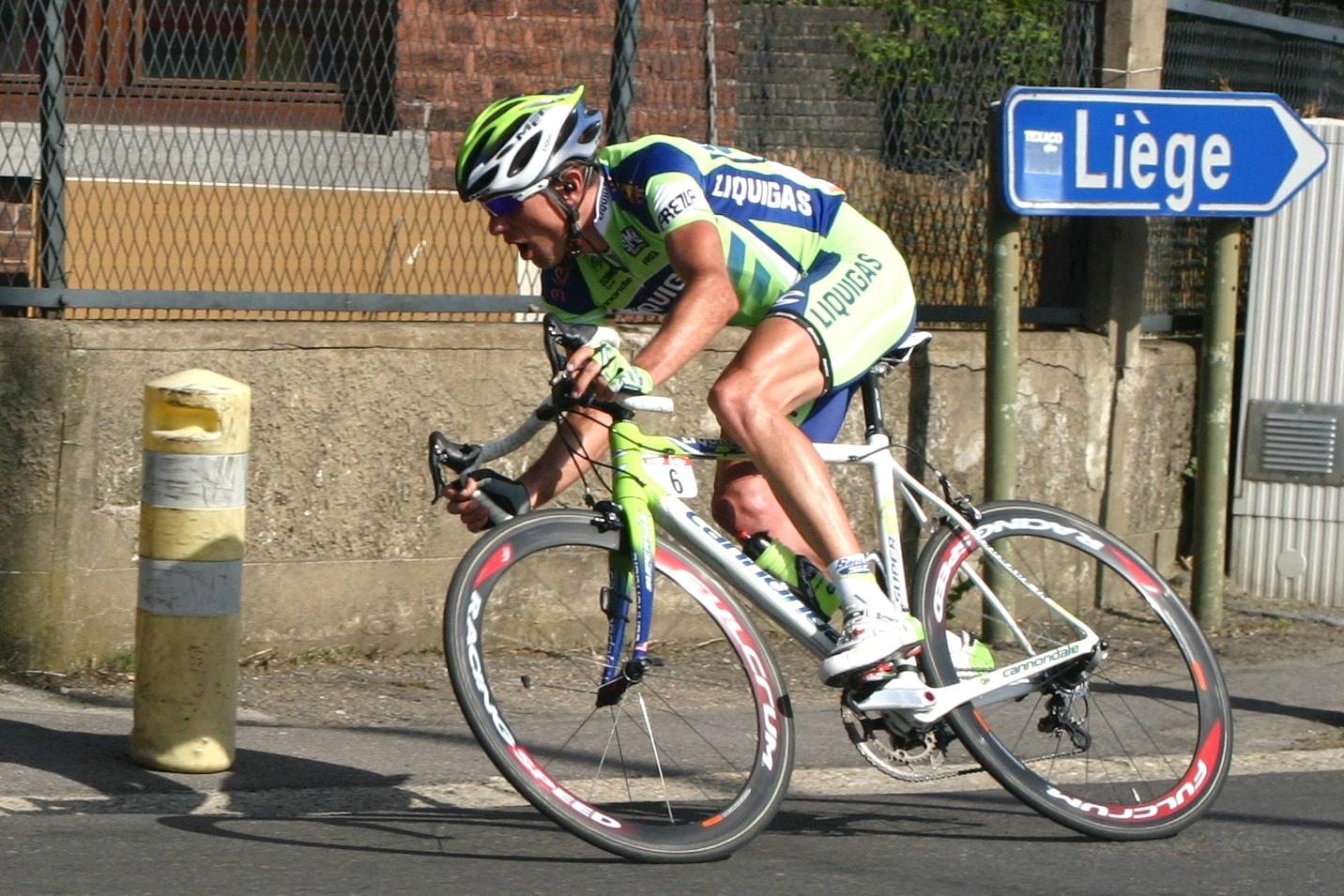

Personal information
- Born: 18 January 1974 (age 52) Zagreb, Croatia
- Height: 1.78 m (5 ft 10 in)
- Weight: 75 kg (165 lb)

Cycling career
- Sport: Cycling
- Current team: Retired
- Discipline: Road
- Role: Rider

Professional teams
- 1997–2001: KRKA–Telekom Slovenije
- 2002–2004: Alessio
- 2005–2009: Liquigas–Bianchi
- 2010–2012: Acqua & Sapone

Major wins
- Grand Tours Giro d'Italia 1 TTT stage (2007) One-day races and Classics National Road Race Championships (1998, 2000, 2012) National Time Trial Championships (2012)

Vladimir Miholjević (born 18 January 1974) is a Croatian former professional road bicycle racer. He turned pro in 1997. As of 2016, he, Robert Kišerlovski and Kristijan Đurasek are only three Croats who has completed the Tour de France. He competed at the 2008 Summer Olympics.

== Major results ==
1998
1st Road race, National Road Championships
1st Overall Tour of Croatia

1st Stages 3 & 5

8th Overall Volta a Portugal
1999
2nd Time trial, National Road Championships
2000
National Road Championships

1st Road race
2nd Time trial

1st Overall Jadranska Magistrala

1st Stage 2

1st Tour du Doubs
2nd Overall Tour de Slovénie
7th Overall UNIQA Classic
2001
1st Poreč Trophy
National Road Championships

2nd Time trial
3rd Road race

3rd Overall Tour de Slovénie
8th Vlaamse Havenpijl
9th Overall Niedersachsen-Rundfahrt
9th Veenendaal–Veenendaal
2002
1st Mountains classification Paris–Nice
2003
7th Overall Settimana Internazionale Coppi e Bartali
2004
3rd Gran Premio di Lugano
4th Overall Giro della Provincia di Lucca
2005
5th Gran Premio di Lugano
7th Giro dell'Emilia
10th Züri-Metzgete
2007
1st Stage 1 (TTT) Giro d'Italia
2008
2nd Road race, National Road Championships
2010
8th Overall Giro del Trentino
2011
9th Overall Giro del Trentino
10th Overall Giro di Sardegna
2012
National Road Championships

1st Road race
1st Time trial

=== Grand Tour general classification results timeline ===
Grand Tour	2002	2003	2004	2005	2006	2007	2008	2009	2010	2011
Giro d'Italia	35	39	24	31	DNF	65	21	53	25	31
Tour de France	—	50	—	—	—	—	—	—	—	—
Vuelta a España	24	—	78	—	—	—	—	—	—	—

Legend
—	Did not compete
DNF	Did not finish

== Private life ==
His son Fran is also a professional racing cyclist.
