= Croatian National Road Race Championships =

Cycling race

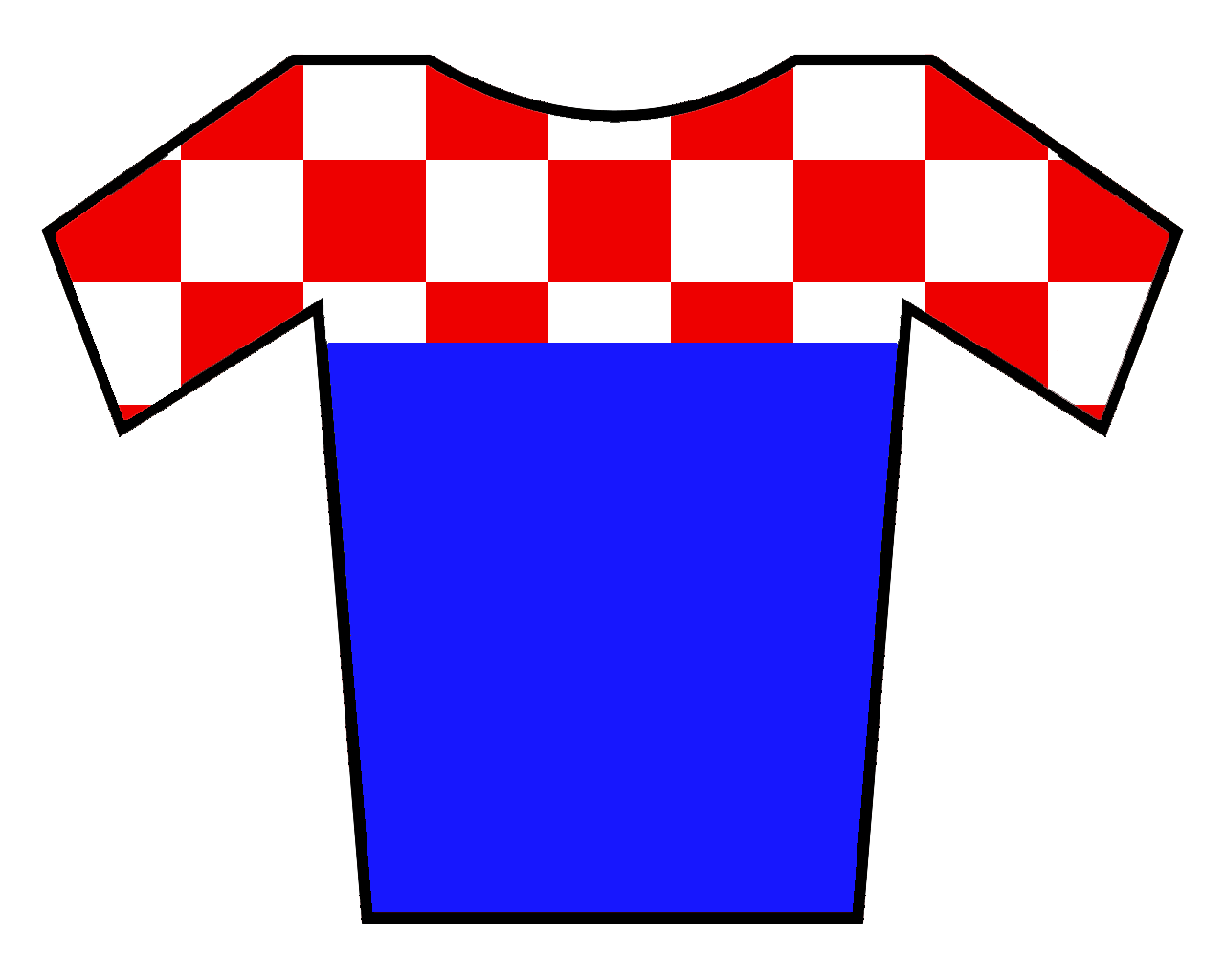
The champion's jersey

The Croatian National Road Race Championships is a cycling race where the Croatian cyclists decide who will become the champion for the year to come.

== Men ==
=== Elite ===
Year	Gold	Silver	Bronze
1992	Zvonimir Belščak	Neven Kovačić	Mario Valpotić
1993	Robert Pečnjak	Eduard Kišerlovski	Neven Kovačić
1994	Damir Kovačić	Neven Kovačić	Robert Pečnjak
1995	Neven Kovačić	Vladimir Miholjević	?
1996	Martin Čotar	Žak Fonović	Robert Pečnjak
1997	Srđan Luštica	Žak Fonović	Eduard Kišerlovski
1998	Vladimir Miholjević	Martin Čotar	Šime Pocrnja
1999	Martin Čotar	Radoslav Rogina	Hrvoje Miholjević
2000	Vladimir Miholjević	Massimo Demarin	Hrvoje Miholjević
2001	Hrvoje Miholjević	Radoslav Rogina	Vladimir Miholjević
2002	Massimo Demarin	Martin Cotar	Radoslav Rogina
2003	Radoslav Rogina	Hrvoje Miholjević	Massimo Demarin
2004	Tomislav Dančulović	Radoslav Rogina	Massimo Demarin
2005	Matija Kvasina	Radoslav Rogina	Hrvoje Miholjević
2006	Hrvoje Miholjević	Massimo Demarin	David Demanuele
2007	Tomislav Dančulović	Radoslav Rogina	Matija Kvasina
2008	Tomislav Dančulović	Vladimir Miholjević	Kristijan Đurasek
2009	Kristijan Đurasek	Radoslav Rogina	Emanuel Kišerlovski
2010	Radoslav Rogina	Darko Blazevic	Luka Grubić
2011	Kristijan Đurasek	Tomislav Dančulović	Matija Kvasina
2012	Vladimir Miholjević	Kristijan Đurasek	Robert Kišerlovski
2013	Robert Kišerlovski	Radoslav Rogina	Emanuel Kišerlovski
2014	Radoslav Rogina	Emanuel Kišerlovski	Matija Kvasina
2015	Emanuel Kišerlovski	Josip Rumac	Matija Kvasina
2016	Radoslav Rogina	Josip Rumac	Emanuel Kišerlovski
2017	Josip Rumac	Bruno Radotić (Note: Matija Kvasina initially finished second, but was disqualified from this result following his positive test for molidustat at the 2017 Flèche du Sud.)	Emanuel Kišerlovski
2018	Viktor Potočki	Mateo Bratić	Lorenzo Marenzi
2019	Josip Rumac	Radoslav Rogina	Viktor Potočki
2020	Josip Rumac	Viktor Potočki	Antonio Barać
2021	Viktor Potočki	Fran Miholjević	Filip Kvasina
2022	Carlo Jurišević	Antonio Barać	Ivan Bratić
2023	Viktor Potočki	Antonio Barać	Anthony Bilic
2024	Viktor Potočki	Nicolas Gojkovic	Jan Tisaj

=== U23 ===
Year	Gold	Silver	Bronze
2015	Josip Rumac	Bruno Maltar	Mateo Franković
2016	Josip Rumac	Mateo Franković	—
2017	David Jabuka	Filip Kvasina	Fran Majoli
2018	Viktor Potočki	Mateo Bratić	Lorenzo Marenzi
2019	Viktor Potočki	Matija Meštrić	Anthony Bilić
2020	Viktor Potočki	Filip Kvasina	Carlo Jurišević
2021	Viktor Potočki	Fran Miholjević	Matija Lojen
2022	Carlo Jurišević	Fran Miholjević	—

== Women ==
Year	Gold	Silver	Bronze
2007	Viena Balen	Ivana Ruszkowski	Leopoldina Beljan
2008	Viena Balen	Marina Boduljak	Ivana Ruszkowski
2009	Marina Boduljak	Mia Radotić	Jelena Gracin
2010	Marina Boduljak	Mia Radotić	Wanda Svrakic
2011	Mia Radotić	Maja Marukic	Jelena Gracin
2012	Mia Radotić	Antonela Ferenčić	Mira Mocan
2013	Antonela Ferenčić	Mia Radotić	Wanda Svrakic
2014	Mia Radotić	Antonela Ferenčić	Wanda Svrakic
2015	Mia Radotić	Antonela Ferenčić	Diana Vrdoljak
2016	Mia Radotić	Antonela Ferenčić	Andrea Husajina
2017	Mia Radotić	Gloria Musa	Alessandra Musa
2018	Mia Radotić	Alessandra Musa	Gloria Musa
2019	Maja Perinović	Mia Radotić	Maja Bonacic
2020	Maja Perinović	Mia Radotić	Natalija Bakula
2021	Maja Perinović	Mia Radotić	Maja Marukić
2022	Matea Deliu	Mia Radotić	Andrea Heged
2023	Majda Horvat	Andrea Heged	Mia Radotić
2024	Majda Horvat	Maja Bonacic	Andrea Heged

== See also ==
- Croatian National Time Trial Championships
- National road cycling championships
