= Josip Rumac =

Croatian cyclist (born 1994)

Personal information
- Born: 26 October 1994 (age 31) Rijeka, Croatia
- Height: 1.82 m (6 ft 0 in)
- Weight: 69 kg (152 lb)

Cycling career
- Sport: Cycling
- Discipline: Road
- Role: Rider

Amateur team
- 2012: World Cycling Centre

Professional teams
- → 2013: Etixx–IHNed (stagiaire)
- 2014: Etixx
- 2015: Adria Mobil
- 2016–2018: Synergy Baku
- 2018: Meridiana–Kamen
- 2018: Adria Mobil
- 2019–2021: Androni Giocattoli–Sidermec
- 2022: Meridiana–Kamen

Major wins
- Single-day races and Classics National Road Race Championships (2017, 2019, 2020) National Time Trial Championships (2018–2020)

Josip Rumac (born 26 October 1994) is a Croatian cyclist, who most recently rode for UCI Continental team Meridiana–Kamen. In October 2020, he was named in the startlist for the 2020 Giro d'Italia.

== Major results ==
2011
National Junior Road Championships

1st Road race
1st Time trial

2012
2nd GP dell'Arno
3rd Road race, UCI Junior Road World Championships
3rd Giro del Mendrisiotto
9th Overall Grand Prix Rüebliland
2013
3rd Time trial, National Road Championships
9th Time trial, Mediterranean Games
2014
2nd Time trial, National Road Championships
2015
1st Road race, National Under-23 Road Championships
2nd Road race, National Road Championships
7th Trofej Umag
9th Road race, UEC European Under-23 Road Championships
2016
2nd Road race, National Road Championships
2nd Time trial, National Under-23 Road Championships
3rd Giro del Belvedere
5th Trofej Umag
10th GP Izola
2017
1st Road Race, National Road Championships
5th Trofeo Alcide Degasperi
6th GP Izola
9th Poreč Trophy
10th Overall Tour du Maroc

1st Mountains classification

2018
1st Time trial, National Road Championships
9th Trofej Umag
2019
National Road Championships

1st Road race
1st Time trial

2020
National Road Championships

1st Road race
1st Time trial

=== Grand Tour general classification results timeline ===
| Grand Tour | 2020 |
|---|---|
| Giro d'Italia | 99 |
| Tour de France | — |
| Vuelta a España | — |

Legend
| — | Did not compete |
| DNF | Did not finish |
