= Tomislav Dančulović =

Croatian cyclist

Personal information
- Born: 15 June 1980 (age 46) Rijeka, Croatia

Cycling career
- Sport: Cycling
- Discipline: Road
- Role: Rider

Professional teams
- 2003–2006: Perutnina Ptuj
- 2009–2012: Loborika

Tomislav Dančulović (born 15 June 1980) is a Croatian cyclist.

== Palmares ==
2003
2nd National Trime Trial Championships
2004
1st National Road Race Championships
3rd Overall Paths of King Nikola
3rd GP Triberg-Schwarzwald
2006
1st Overall Rhône-Alpes Isère Tour
2007
1st National Road Race Championships
1st Gran Premio Città di Felino
1st Gara Ciclistica Montappone
2008
1st National Road Race Championships
2009
1st Trofeo Zsšdi
2011
1st Raiffeisen Grand Prix
2nd Overall Okolo Slovenska
2nd National Road Race Championships
