= Viena =

Viena may refer to:

== Places ==
- The Spanish and Portuguese name for Vienna, the capital of Austria
- White Karelia, known as Viena or Vienan Karjala in Finnish, a historical region in Europe
  - Viena expedition, 1918
  - Viena Karelian dialect

== People ==
- Enzo Viena, Argentine actor
- Viena Balen, Croatian cyclist
- Viena Tinao, Australian rugby league footballer

== Other ==
- La Viena FC, Egyptian football club

== See also ==
- Viena and the Fantomes, 2020 American film
