= GW Erco Shimano =

Italian cycling team

GW–Shimano–Sidermec

Team information
- UCI code: GES
- Registered: Italy (1996–2022); Colombia (2023–)
- Founded: 1996
- Discipline: Road
- Status: UCI ProTeam (1996–2022); UCI Continental (2023–)
- Bicycles: Bottecchia
- Website: Team home page

Key personnel
- General manager: Gianni Savio

Team name history
- 1996 1997–1998 1999 2000 2001 2002–2005 2006 2007 2008–2009 2010–2011 2012–2014 2015 2016–2017 2017 2018–2021 2022 2023 2024–: Gaseosas Glacial–Selle Italia; Kross–Selle Italia; Selle Italia; Aguardiente Néctar–Selle Italia; Selle Italia–Pacific; Colombia–Selle Italia; Selle Italia–Serramenti Diquigiovanni; Serramenti PVC Diquigiovanni–Selle Italia; Serramenti PVC Diquigiovanni–Androni Giocattoli; Androni Giocattoli; Androni Giocattoli–Venezuela; Androni–Sidermec; Androni Giocattoli–Sidermec; Androni–Sidermec–Bottecchia; Androni Giocattoli–Sidermec; Drone Hopper–Androni Giocattoli; GW–Shimano–Sidermec; GW Erco Shimano
GW Erco Shimano jersey
Jersey

GW Erco Shimano (UCI team code: GES) is a Colombian-registered UCI Continental cycling team that participates in road bicycle racing events on the UCI Continental Circuits. Prior to 2023, the team was based in Italy and held UCI ProTeam status. Gianni Savio manages the team, with assistance from directeurs sportifs Giovanni Ellena, Antonio Castano, Didier Paindaveine and Marco Bellini.

In 2022, with the arrival of a new sponsor — Drone Hopper (an aeronautical engineering company based in Spain) — the team has received a new name Drone Hopper–Androni Giocattoli.

== Doping ==
On 5 June 2014 Patrick Facchini gave an adverse analytical finding for Tuaminoheptane and was consequently banned for 10 months.

On 30 June 2015 Davide Appollonio gave an adverse analytical finding for EPO and was provisionally suspended. On 27 July 2015 Fabio Taborre gave a positive test result for the banned blood-booster FG-4592 in an out-of-competition control on 16 June. The team were automatically suspended by the UCI under new rules. FG-4592 (Roxadustat) is in phase 3 clinical trials and has not yet been commercialised. The drug was developed jointly by FibroGen and AstraZeneca. Unlike EPO, which directly stimulates the production of red blood cells, FG-4592 is taken orally, and stimulates natural production of EPO in a manner similar to altitude training. This class of compounds has been outlawed by WADA. The UCI subsequently suspended the team for 30 days.

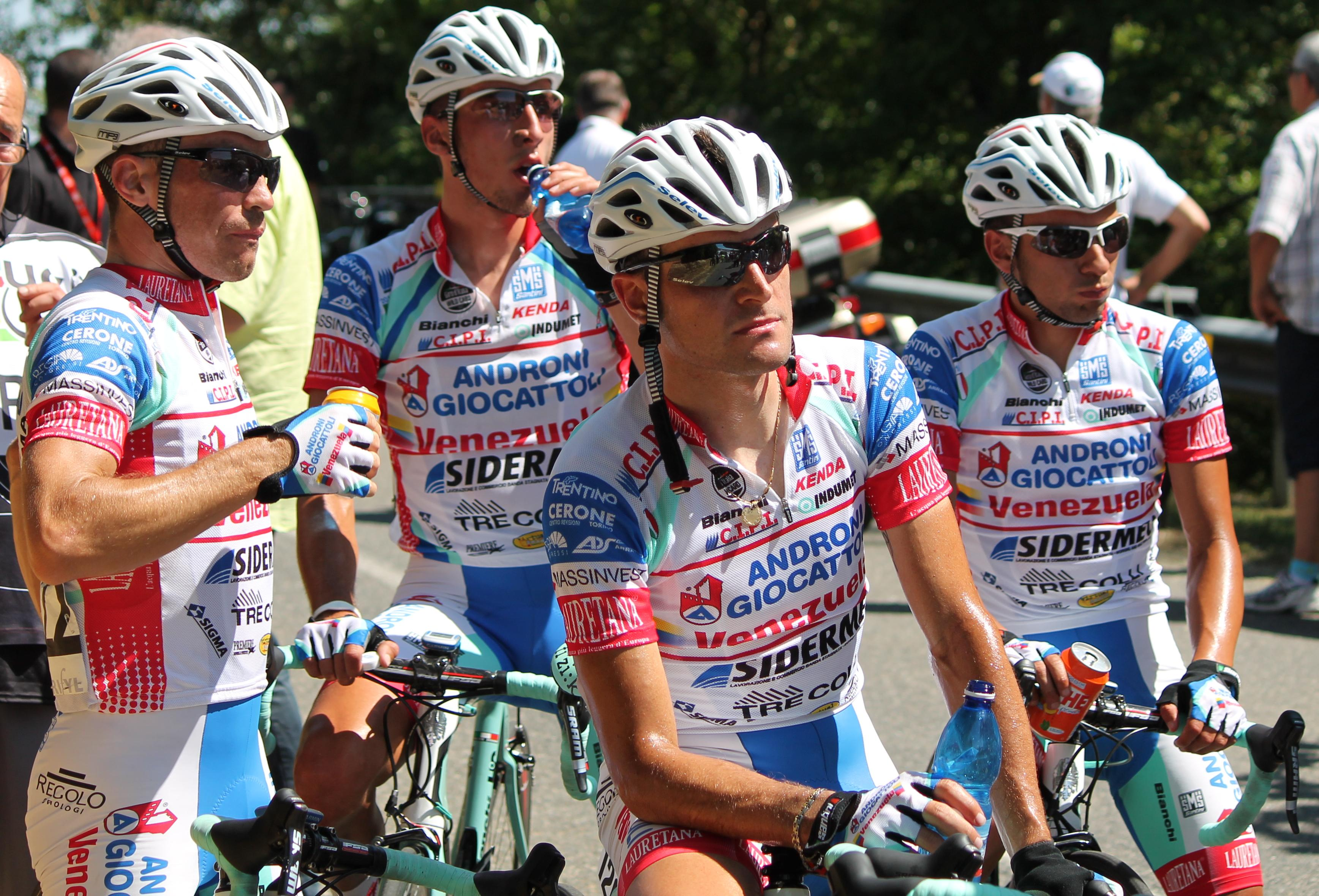
Riders at the 2012 Route du Sud

== Team roster ==
As of 7 February 2024.

Rider	Date of birth
Daniel Arroyave (COL)	19 June 2000 (age 26)
Lukas Blanco (COL)	29 July 2002 (age 24)
Adrián Bustamante (COL)	10 June 1998 (age 28)
William Colorado (COL)	24 June 2004 (age 22)
Oscar Garzon (COL)	22 June 2003 (age 23)
Fabian Lopez (COL)	17 September 1996 (age 30)
Juan Carlos López (COL)	25 March 2001 (age 25)
Andrés Mancipe (COL)	10 July 2002 (age 24)

Rider	Date of birth
Alejandro Osorio (COL)	28 May 1998 (age 28)
Frank Osorio (COL)	28 August 1987 (age 39)
Diego Pescador (COL)	21 December 2004 (age 21)
Juan Sebastian Pinilla (COL)	8 December 2004 (age 21)
Edgar Pinzón (COL)	25 May 2001 (age 25)
Brandon Rojas (COL)	2 July 2002 (age 24)
Jeferson Ruiz (COL)	6 July 2002 (age 24)
Cristian Velez (COL)	16 February 2005 (age 21)

== National champions ==
2000
Colombia Time Trial, Israel Ochoa
2001
Australia Time Trial, Kristjan Snorrasson
2002
Colombia Road Race, Jhon García
2005
Colombia Time Trial, Iván Parra
2009
Switzerland Time Trial, Rubens Bertogliati
2010
Switzerland Time Trial, Rubens Bertogliati
2012
Italy Road Race, Franco Pellizotti
Venezuela Road Race, Miguel Ubeto
Venezuela Time Trial, Tomás Gil
2014
Venezuela U23 Time Trial, Yonder Godoy
2015
Venezuela Time Trial, Yonder Godoy
Romania Time Trial, Serghei Țvetcov
Romania Road Race, Serghei Țvetcov
2019
Croatia Time Trial, Josip Rumac
Croatia Road Race, Josip Rumac
2020
Croatia Time Trial, Josip Rumac
Croatia Road Race, Josip Rumac
2021
Ecuador Road Race, Jefferson Alexander Cepeda
Ukraine Road Race, Andrii Ponomar
2023
U23 Colombia Time Trial, Germán Darío Gómez
2024
U23 Colombia Road Race, Brandon Rojas
Colombia Road Race, Alejandro Osorio
