= Emanuel Kišerlovski =

Croatian cyclist (born 1984)

Personal information
- Full name: Emanuel Kišerlovski
- Born: 3 August 1984 (age 42) Čačak, Yugoslavia (now Serbia)

Cycling career
- Sport: Cycling
- Disciplines: Road; Cyclo-cross
- Role: Rider

Professional teams
- 2009–2012: Loborika
- 2013–2021: Meridiana–Kamen

Major wins
- One-day races and Classics National Road Race Championships (2015)

Emanuel Kišerlovski (born 3 August 1984) is a Croatian racing cyclist, who most recently rode for UCI Continental team Meridiana–Kamen. He rode at the 2014 UCI Road World Championships, and is the brother of fellow racing cyclist Robert Kišerlovski.

== Major results ==
2006
3rd Time trial, National Road Championships
2008
6th Overall The Paths of King Nikola
8th Raiffeisen Grand Prix
2009
3rd Road race, National Road Championships
8th Zagreb–Ljubljana
10th Tour of Vojvodina I
2011
4th Central European Tour Miskolc GP
2012
7th Overall Sibiu Cycling Tour
2013
3rd Road race, National Road Championships
2014
National Road Championships

2nd Road race
3rd Time trial

2015
1st Road race, National Road Championships
7th Overall Tour of Croatia
2016
3rd Road race, National Road Championships
2017
3rd Road race, National Road Championships
2018
4th Road race, National Road Championships
