= Mariano Giallorenzo =

Italian cyclist

Personal information
- Born: 7 August 1982 (age 44) Rovereto, Italy

Cycling career
- Sport: Cycling
- Current team: Kamen Pazin
- Discipline: Road
- Role: Rider (retired); Team manager; Directeur sportif

Professional teams
- 2005–2006: Colombia–Selle Italia
- 2007–2008: Miche
- 2009: Meridiana–Kalev Chocolate
- 2010–2012: Meridiana–Kamen
- 2014: Meridiana–Kamen

Managerial team
- 2015–: Meridiana–Kamen

Mariano Giallorenzo (born 7 August 1982) is an Italian former road cyclist, who competed as a professional from 2005 to 2014. Since 2015, he has worked as a directeur sportif for UCI Continental team Kamen Pazin.

== Major results ==
2004
1st Overall Tour du Sénégal
1st Targa Libero Ferrario
1st Medaglia d'Oro Nino Ronco
