= Cotar =

Cotar ( Čotar) is a South Slavic language surname. Notable people with the surname include:

- Anamarija Čotar, a member of Slovenian musical group Perpetuum Jazzile
- Cédric Cotar, French American football player
- Joana Cotar (born 1973), German politician
- Martin Cotar (born 1977), Croatian cyclist
