= Bruno Maltar =

Croatian cyclist

Personal information
- Born: 6 October 1994 (age 32) Valpovo, Croatia

Cycling career
- Sport: Cycling
- Current team: Retired
- Discipline: Road
- Role: Rider

Professional teams
- 2013–2014: Adria Mobil
- 2015: Meridiana–Kamen
- 2016: Radenska–Ljubljana
- 2017–2018: Meridiana–Kamen

Bruno Maltar (born 6 October 1994) is a Croatian former racing cyclist. He rode at the UCI Road World Championships in 2013 and 2014.

== Major results ==
2011
2nd Time trial, National Junior Road Championships
2013
2nd Time trial, National Road Championships
2014
1st Time trial, National Road Championships
2015
National Road Championships

1st Under-23 time trial
2nd Time trial
2nd Under-23 road race

2016
1st Time trial, National Under-23 Road Championships
2018
3rd Overall Tour of Albania
