= Antonio Barać =

Croatian cyclist (born 1997)

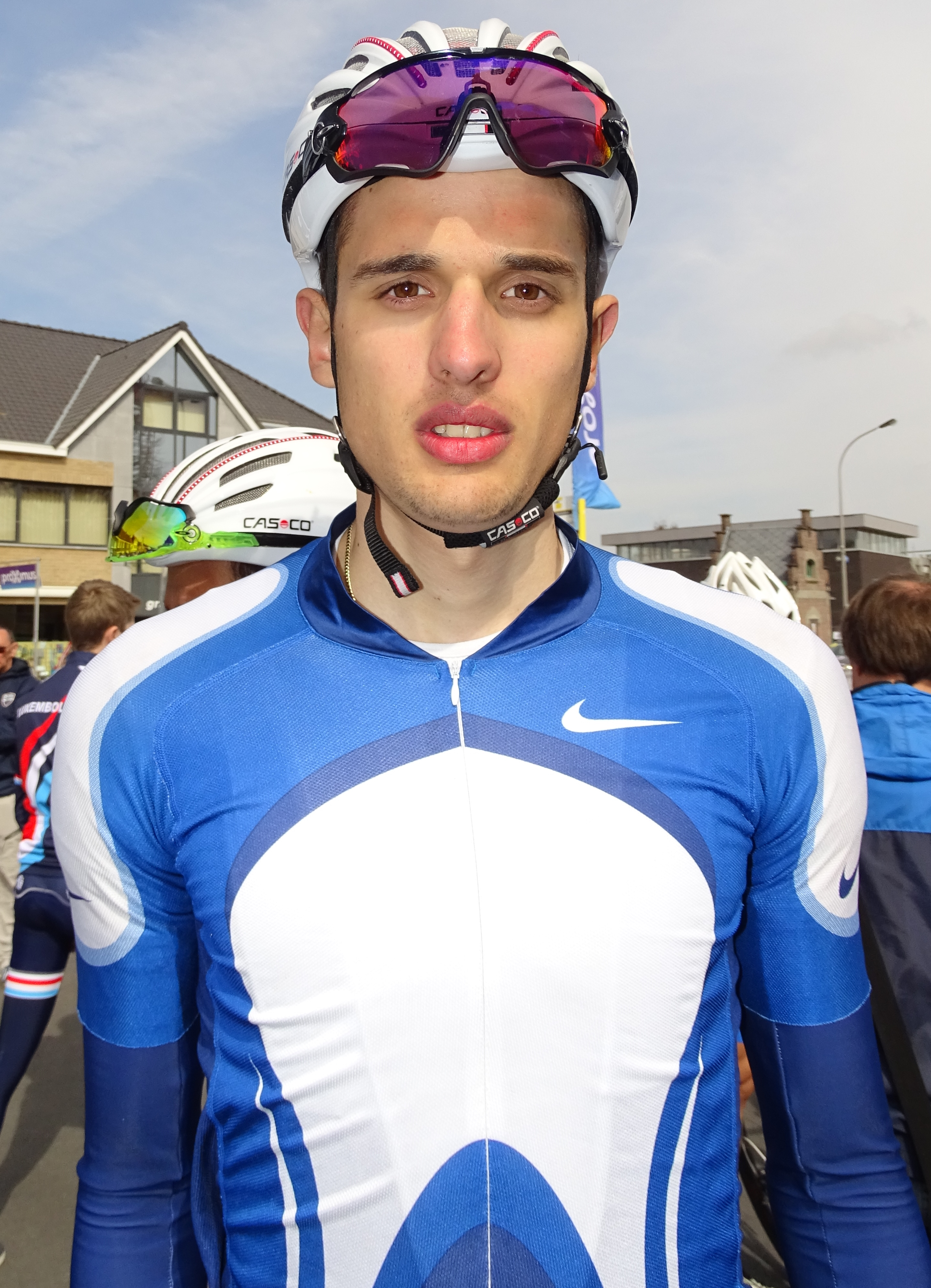
- Barać in 2016

Personal information
- Full name: Antonio Barać
- Born: 19 January 1997 (age 29) Livno, Bosnia and Herzegovina
- Height: 1.90 m (6 ft 3 in)
- Weight: 73 kg (161 lb)

Cycling career
- Sport: Cycling
- Discipline: Road
- Role: Rider

Amateur teams
- 2015–2018: World Cycling Centre
- 2017: CCN Metalac

Professional teams
- 2019–2022: Meridiana–Kamen
- 2023: Team Corratec

Antonio Barać (born 19 January 1997) is a Croatian professional racing cyclist, who most recently rode for UCI ProTeam Team Corratec–Selle Italia. He rode in the men's road race at the 2019 UCI Road World Championships in Yorkshire, England.

== Major results ==
2017
2nd Time trial, National Under-23 Road Championships
5th Overall Tour de Serbia
5th Belgrade Banjaluka II
2018
2nd Time trial, National Under-23 Road Championships
2019
6th Overall Tour of Albania
8th Croatia–Slovenia
2020
3rd Road race, National Road Championships
2022
National Road Championships

2nd Road race
3rd Time trial

4th Overall Tour of Albania
10th Overall Tour de Serbie
2023
National Road Championships

2nd Road race
2nd Time trial

4th Cupa Max Ausnit
