= Kristijan Đurasek =

Croatian road bicycle racer

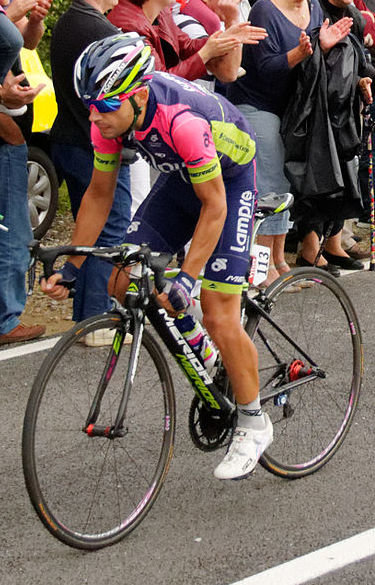
- Đurasek at the 2014 Tour de France

Personal information
- Full name: Kristijan Đurasek
- Born: 26 July 1987 (age 39) Varaždin, SR Croatia, Yugoslavia
- Height: 1.70 m (5 ft 7 in)
- Weight: 56 kg (123 lb; 8 st 11 lb)

Cycling career
- Sport: Cycling
- Discipline: Road
- Role: Rider
- Rider type: Climber

Professional teams
- 2006–2008: Perutnina Ptuj
- 2009–2011: Loborika
- 2012: Adria Mobil
- 2013–2019: Lampre–Merida

Major wins
- Stage races Tour of Turkey (2015) Single-day races and Classics National Road Race Championships (2011) National Time Trial Championships (2011) Tre Valli Varesine (2013)

Kristijan Đurasek (born 26 July 1987) is a Croatian professional road bicycle racer, who most recently rode for UCI WorldTeam UAE Team Emirates. He has been competing since 2005, and has represented Croatia at two Summer Olympic Games, in 2012 and 2016.

In November 2019 he was banned for four years, backdated to May of that year, due to the Operation Aderlass investigation into blood doping.

== Professional career ==
=== Perutnina Ptuj (2006–2008) ===
Đurasek started racing for Slovenian continental team Perutnina Ptuj in 2006, but his professional career only started in 2008. At the time he did not have much success in international races. He competed for Perutnina Ptuj for three years during which he won five medals at the Croatian road cycling championships.

=== Loborika (2009–2011) ===
Đurasek signed a contract with Croatian continental team Loborika at the beginning of 2009. In 2011, he won his first UCI Europe Tour race at the GP Folignano. Two days later he repeated his success by winning the Trofeo Internazionale Bastianelli. During those years he won three more medals at the Croatian road cycling championships including both national titles at the 2011 championships.

=== Adria Mobil (2012) ===
In 2012, Đurasek competed for continental team Adria Mobil. His most notable results were third place in the GP Industria & Artigianato di Larciano, seventh place in the Giro dell'Appennino and third place in the Passo della Bocchetta stage in the Giro di Padania. He competed at the 2012 Summer Olympics as a late replacement for Robert Kišerlovski, who was injured on the 14th stage of the Tour de France. He finished 68th in the road race, 40 seconds behind the race winner Alexander Vinokourov.

=== Lampre–Mérida (2013–2019) ===
At the end of the 2012 season, Đurasek signed a contract with Lampre–Merida for the 2013 season. As a result, he became the third Croatian cyclist ever to ride for a UCI ProTeam. His first UCI World Tour race was Paris–Nice, where he finished 80th overall. His first victory was in the Tre Valli Varesine on 23 August 2013. At the end of the 2013 season Đurasek competed at the World Championships in men's road race, but he failed to complete the race. He finished 7th overall at the 2014 Tour of Turkey, 45 seconds behind the race winner Adam Yates.

In 2015, Đurasek awarded himself the leader's jersey of the Tour of Turkey on the sixth stage featuring a hilltop finish, taking the lead from Davide Rebellin. He went on to win the race in the general classification, scoring a historic result for Croatian cycling. In the Tour de Suisse, he won the second stage by attacking a leading group of eight other riders, putting four seconds into them. He was named in the start list for the 2015 Vuelta a España.

In 2016, Đurasek competed at his second Summer Olympics. At the Games held in Rio de Janeiro, Brazil, Đurasek finished 18th, more than 3 minutes behind the race winner Greg Van Avermaet. As of 2016, 18th place is the best ever Croatian Olympic result across all cycling events. During that year he also took part at the Tour de France and Vuelta a España.

At the start of the 2017 season, Đurasek logged a stage win at the Tour of Croatia, where he outsprinted Vincenzo Nibali at the Biokovo mountain finish.

== Major results ==
2007
2nd Time trial, National Road Championships
2008
National Road Championships

1st Under-23 time trial
3rd Road race

4th Overall Tour de Serbie
2009
2nd Tour of Vojvodina II
6th GP Capodarco
7th Trofeo Internazionale Bastianelli
10th Overall Tour de Serbie
2010
2nd Trofeo Internazionale Bastianelli
2nd Tour of Vojvodina II
3rd Overall Oberösterreich Rundfahrt
5th Overall Giro del Friuli-Venezia Giulia
8th Trofeo Gianfranco Bianchin
10th Banja Luka–Belgrade I
2011
National Road Championships

1st Road race
1st Time trial

1st GP Folignano
1st Trofeo Internazionale Bastianelli
3rd Overall Okolo Slovenska
4th Memoriał Henryka Łasaka
2012
National Road Championships

2nd Road race
2nd Time trial

3rd GP Industria & Artigianato di Larciano
4th Overall Istrian Spring Trophy
7th Giro dell'Appennino
8th Banja Luka–Belgrade II
9th Overall Giro di Padania
2013
1st Tre Valli Varesine
2014
7th Overall Tour of Turkey
7th Tre Valli Varesine
2015
1st Overall Tour of Turkey
1st Stage 2 Tour de Suisse

Voided results from 4 October 2016 to 15 May 2019.

~~2017~~
~~1st Stage 2 Tour of Croatia~~
~~2018~~
~~9th Overall Tour of California~~

=== Grand Tour general classification results timeline ===
Grand Tour	2013	2014	2015	2016	2017	2018
Giro d'Italia	68	—	—	—	—	—
Tour de France	—	46	76	51	~~50~~	~~40~~
Vuelta a España	—	—	63	67	—	—

Legend
—	Did not compete
DNF	Did not finish
~~No.~~	Voided result
