= Vedad Karić =

Bosnian cyclist

Personal information
- Full name: Vedad Karić
- Born: 6 March 1988 (age 38) Derventa, Bosnia and Herzegovina, Yugoslavia
- Height: 1.82 m (6 ft 0 in)
- Weight: 78 kg (172 lb)

Cycling career
- Sport: Cycling
- Current team: Kamen Pazin
- Disciplines: Road; Mountain biking
- Role: Rider

Amateur teams
- 2020: Rotacija Spin Zenica
- 2023–: Kamen Team

Professional team
- 2021–2022: Meridiana–Kamen

Major wins
- One day races & Classics National Road Race Championships (2021, 2022) National Time Trial Championships (2017–2019, 2021–2023)

Vedad Karić (born 6 March 1988) is a Bosnian mountain biker and road cyclist, who currently rides for Croatian club team Kamen Pazin.

== Major results ==
2008
2nd Putevima Vukovog kraja
2012
1st Memorijal Svi Tuzlanski biciklisti
2015
4th Road race, National Road Championships
2016
4th 25 Maj
2017
National Road Championships

1st Time trial
2nd Road race

2018
National Road Championships

1st Time trial
1st Hill climb
3rd Road race

1st Overall Premijer Liga

1st Hercegovina Classic

1st Memorijal Svi Tuzlanski biciklisti
3rd 25 Maj
2019
National Road Championships

1st Time trial
1st Hill climb
2nd Road race

1st Overall Premijer Liga
1st Memorijal Svi Tuzlanski biciklisti
2nd 25 Maj
2020
1st Hill climb, National Road Championships
National Mountain bike Championships

1st Olympic cross-country (XCO)
1st Cross-country eliminator (XCE)
1st Marathon (XCM)

1st Memorijal Svi Tuzlanski biciklisti
1st 25 Maj
2021
National Road Championships

1st Road race
1st Time trial

4th Adriatic Race
2022
National Road Championships

1st Road race
1st Time trial
1st Hill climb

2023
1st Time trial, National Road Championships
2024
2nd Overall Tour of Albania
