= Fran Miholjević =

Croatian cyclist

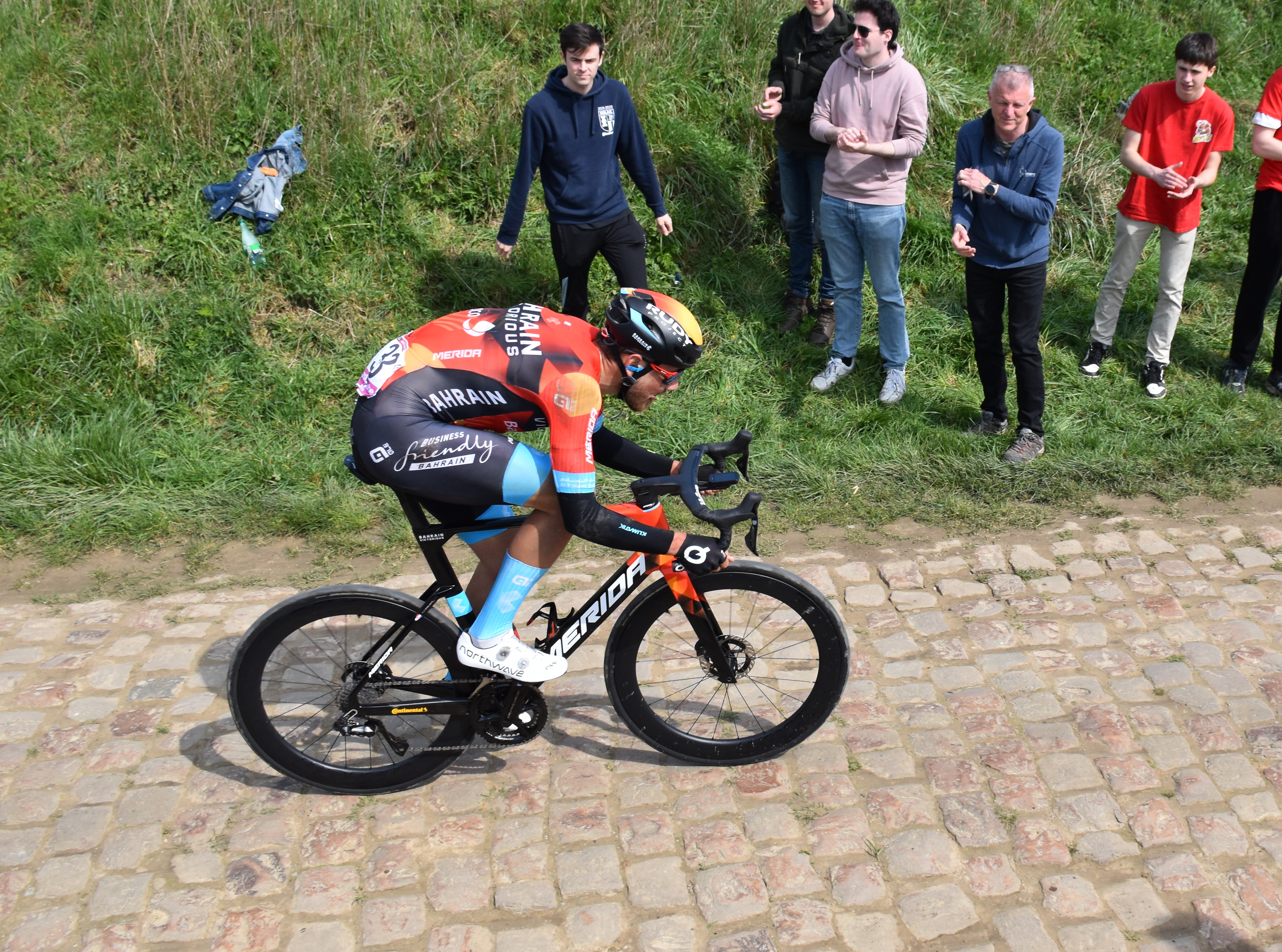
- Paris-Roubaix 2023 - Secteur pavé de Quiévy à Saint-Python - N° 33 Miholjevic.

Personal information
- Born: 2 August 2002 (age 24) Rijeka, Croatia
- Weight: 70 kg (154 lb)

Cycling career
- Sport: Cycling
- Current team: Team Bahrain Victorious
- Discipline: Road
- Role: Rider

Professional teams
- 2021–2022: Cycling Team Friuli ASD
- 2022: Team Bahrain Victorious (stagiaire)
- 2023–: Team Bahrain Victorious
Medal record
Representing Croatia
Men's road bicycle racing
European Championships
Silver medal – second place	2022 Anadia	Under-23 time trial

Fran Miholjević (born 2 August 2002) is a Croatian cyclist, who currently rides for UCI WorldTeam Team Bahrain Victorious.

== Major results ==
2019
National Junior Road Championships

1st Time trial
2nd Road race

1st Overall Belgrade Trophy Milan Panić

1st Young rider classification
1st Stage 1b

6th Gran Premio Eccellenze Valli del Soligo
9th Trofeo Guido Dorigo
2020
National Junior Road Championships

1st Road race
1st Time trial

4th Time trial, UEC European Junior Road Championships
2021
1st Time trial, National Under-23 Road Championships
2nd Road race, National Road Championships
3rd Overall Carpathian Couriers Race

1st Young rider classification
1st Prologue

4th GP Capodarco
2022
1st Time trial, National Road Championships
1st Overall Carpathian Couriers Race

1st Points classification
1st Young rider classification
1st Stage 1

1st GP Vipava Valley & Crossborder Goriška
1st Stage 3 Giro di Sicilia
1st Stage 1 Giro della Friuli Venezia Giulia
2nd Time trial, UEC European Under-23 Road Championships
2nd Trofeo Città di San Vendemiano
2023
1st Time trial, National Road Championships

=== Grand Tour general classification results timeline ===
Grand Tour	2024
Giro d'Italia	—
Tour de France	—
Vuelta a España	87

Legend
—	Did not compete
DNF	Did not finish

== Private life ==
His father Vladimir was also a professional racing cyclist.
