= Viktor Potočki =

Croatian cyclist (born 1999)

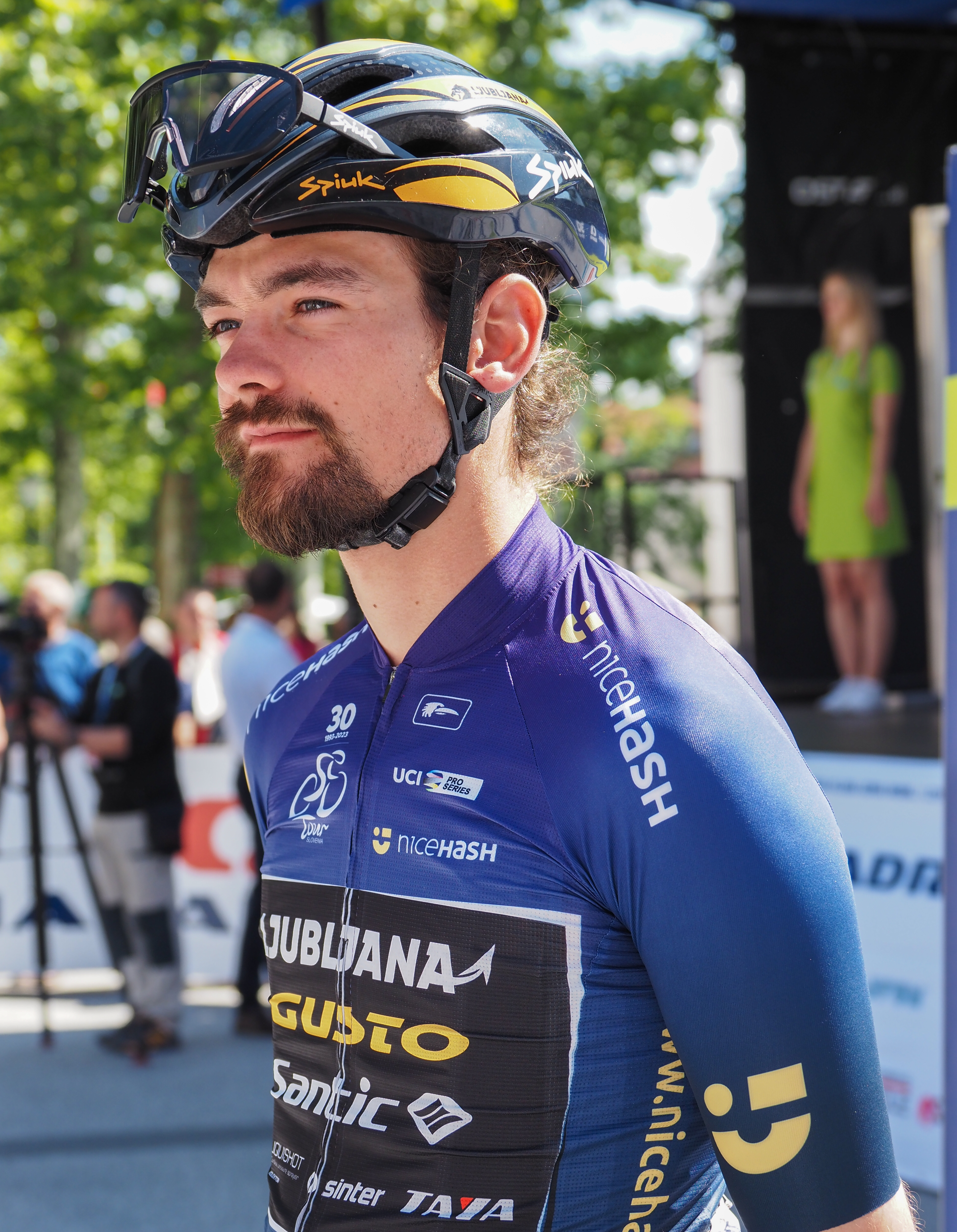
- Potočki on 2023 Tour of Slovenia

Personal information
- Full name: Viktor Potočki
- Born: 27 March 1999 (age 27) Donja Stubica, Croatia
- Height: 1.76 m (5 ft 9 in)
- Weight: 67 kg (148 lb)

Cycling career
- Sport: Cycling
- Current team: Pogi Team Gusto Ljubljana
- Discipline: Road
- Role: Rider

Amateur team
- 2017: Centre Mondial du Cyclisme

Professional team
- 2018–: Ljubljana Gusto Xaurum

Major wins
- One-day races and Classics National Road Race Championships (2018, 2021, 2023, 2024)

Viktor Potočki (born 27 March 1999) is a Croatian professional road racing cyclist, who currently rides for UCI Continental team Pogi Team Gusto Ljubljana.

In 2018, Potočki won the Croatian National Road Race Championships.

== Major results ==
2016
National Junior Road Championships

1st Road race
3rd Time trial

7th Overall Belgrade Trophy Milan Panić
2017
National Junior Road Championships

1st Road race
1st Time trial

5th Overall Belgrade Trophy Milan Panić
2018
1st Road Race, National Road Championships
3rd Time trial, National Under–23 Road Championships
6th Overall Tour de Serbie

1st Young rider classification

2019
1st Time trial, National Under–23 Road Championships
3rd Road Race, National Road Championships
6th GP Sencur
8th GP Kranj
2020
National Track Championships

1st Kilo
1st Individual Pursuit

1st Time trial, National Under–23 Road Championships
1st National Cyclo–cross Championships
2nd Road Race, National Road Championships
2021
1st Road Race, National Road Championships
2nd Giro del Belvedere
2nd Kerekparverseny
3rd Time trial, National Under–23 Road Championships
5th GP Capodarco
2022
National Road Championships

2nd Time trial
5th Road race

3rd Poreč Trophy
4th Overall Tour de Serbie

1st Points classification
1st Stage 2

4th GP Adria Mobil
6th GP Poland, Visegrad 4 Bicycle Race
7th GP Slovenian Istria
8th GP Kranj
2023
1st Road Race, National Road Championships
4th GP Adria Mobil
6th Overall Belgrade Banjaluka
8th GP Slovenian Istria
10th Poreč Trophy
2024
1st Road Race, National Road Championships
