= Antonela Ferenčić =

Croatian cyclist

Personal information
- Born: 23 April 1994 (age 32) Pazin, Croatia

Cycling career
- Sport: Cycling
- Discipline: Road
- Role: Rider

Antonela Ferenčić (born 23 April 1994) is a Croatian racing cyclist. The winner of the 2013 Croatian National Road Race Championships, Ferenčić competed in the women's road race at the UCI Road World Championships in 2013, and 2014.
