= Gašper Katrašnik =

Slovenian cyclist

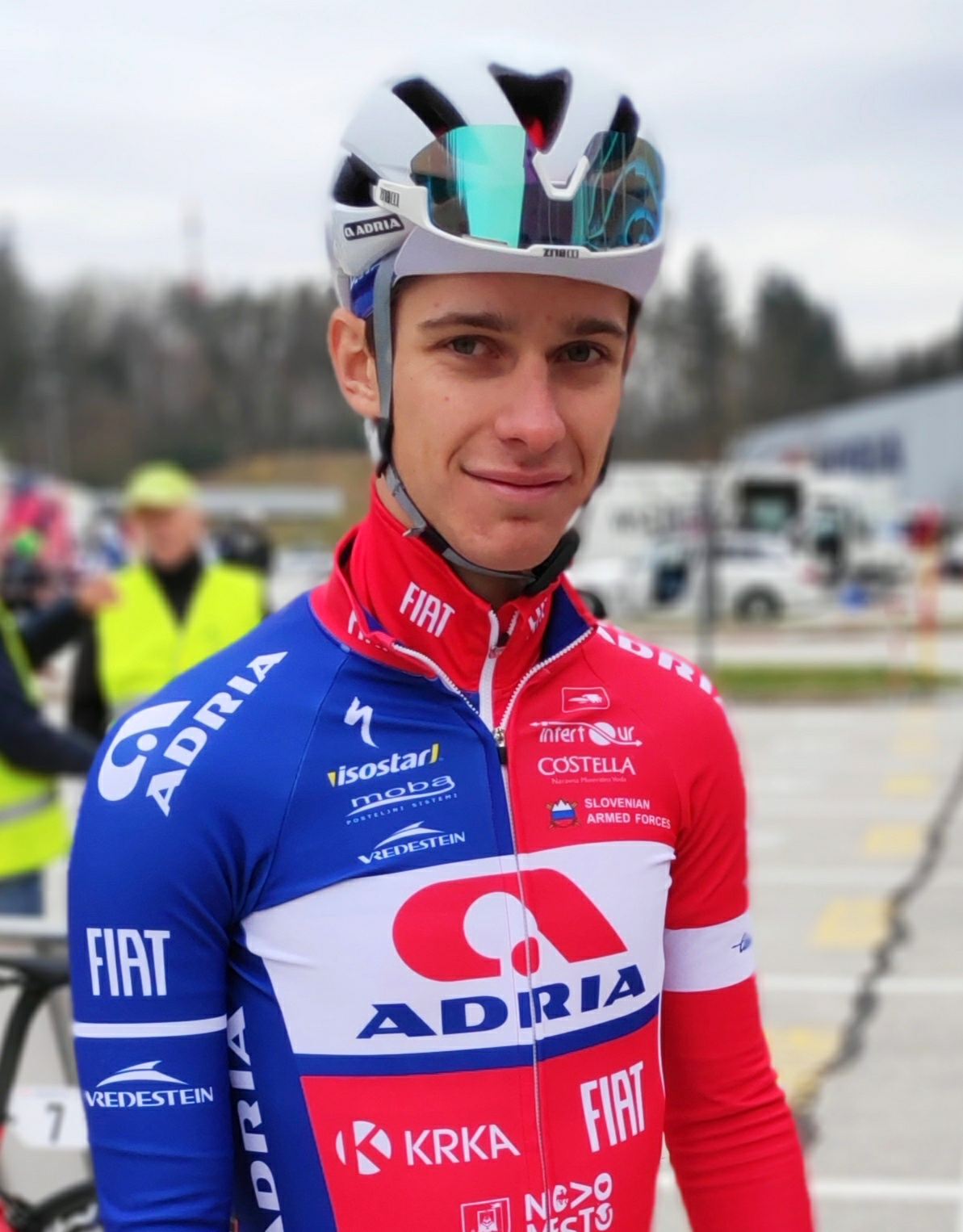
- Katrašnik at the 2019 GP Adria Mobil

Personal information
- Full name: Gašper Katrašnik
- Born: 20 June 1995 (age 31) Kranj, Slovenia
- Height: 1.81 m (5 ft 11 in)
- Weight: 69 kg (152 lb)

Cycling career
- Sport: Cycling
- Current team: Retired
- Discipline: Road
- Role: Rider

Amateur team
- 2014–2015: KK Sava Kranj

Professional team
- 2016–2021: Adria Mobil

Gašper Katrašnik (born 20 June 1995) is a Slovenian former racing cyclist, who competed as a professional from 2016 to 2021 for UCI Continental team Adria Mobil.

== Major results ==
2012
1st Road race, National Junior Road Championships
5th Road race, UEC European Junior Road Championships
2015
1st Grand Prix Sarajevo
7th Road race, UEC European Under-23 Road Championships
8th GP Izola
2016
9th GP Kranj
10th GP Adria Mobil
2017
5th Belgrade–Banja Luka I
7th Overall Tour of Małopolska
7th Belgrade–Banja Luka II
8th GP Izola
10th Gran Premio della Liberazione
2018
1st Overall Belgrade–Banja Luka

1st Stages 1 & 2

1st Stage 4 Szlakiem Grodów Piastowskich
5th Poreč Trophy
2019
2nd Road race, National Road Championships
9th Poreč Trophy
2020
2nd Poreč Trophy
