= Aljaž Hočevar =

Slovenian cyclist

Personal information
- Born: 20 August 1991 (age 35)

Cycling career
- Sport: Cycling
- Current team: Retired
- Discipline: Road
- Role: Rider

Professional team
- 2010–2014: Adria Mobil

Aljaž Hočevar (born 20 August 1991) is a Slovenian former cyclist, who rode professionally between 2010 and 2014 for the Adria Mobil team.

== Major results ==
2011
3rd Tour of Vojvodina II
2013
1st Trofej Umag
2nd Central European Tour Budapest GP
5th Banja Luka Belgrade I
2014
2nd Central European Tour Budapest GP
6th Trofej Umag
