= Mia Radotić =

Croatian cyclist

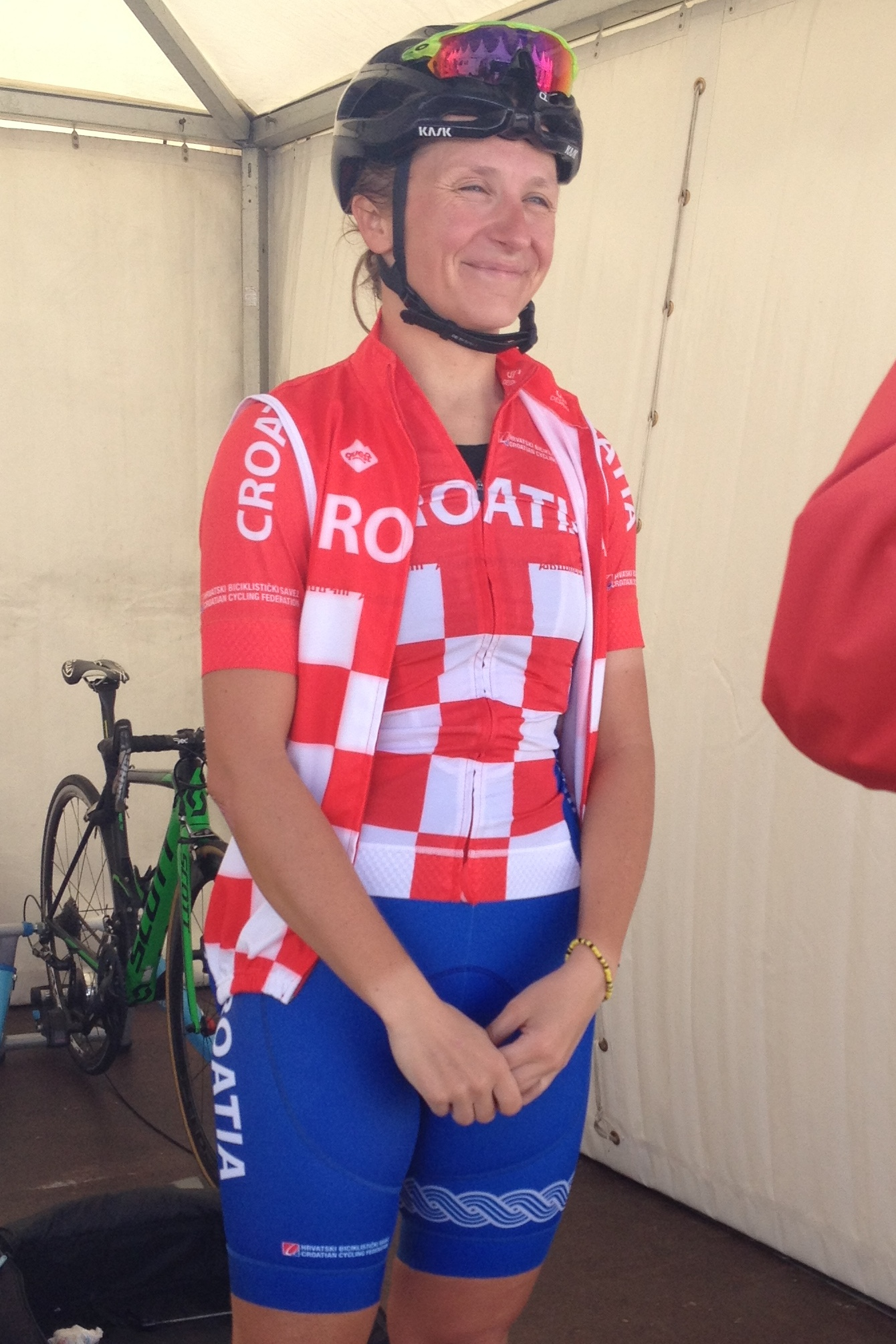
- Radotić at the 2019 European Road Championships

Personal information
- Full name: Mia Radotić
- Born: 2 December 1984 (age 41): Međimurje County, SFR Yugoslavia; (now Croatia)

Cycling career
- Sport: Cycling
- Disciplines: Road; Cyclo-cross
- Role: Rider

Professional teams
- 2014–2019: BTC City Ljubljana
- 2020: Cogeas–Mettler–Look

Major wins
- Single-day races and Classics National Road Race Championships (2011–2012, 2014–2018) National Time Trial Championships (2009, 2011–2022) National Cyclo-cross Championships (2012, 2014, 2019)

Mia Radotić (born 2 December 1984) is a Croatian racing cyclist, who most recently rode for UCI Women's Continental Team Cogeas–Mettler–Look. She has competed at the UCI Road World Championships on seven occasions between 2011 and 2019, competing in the road race, time trial, and team time trial events.

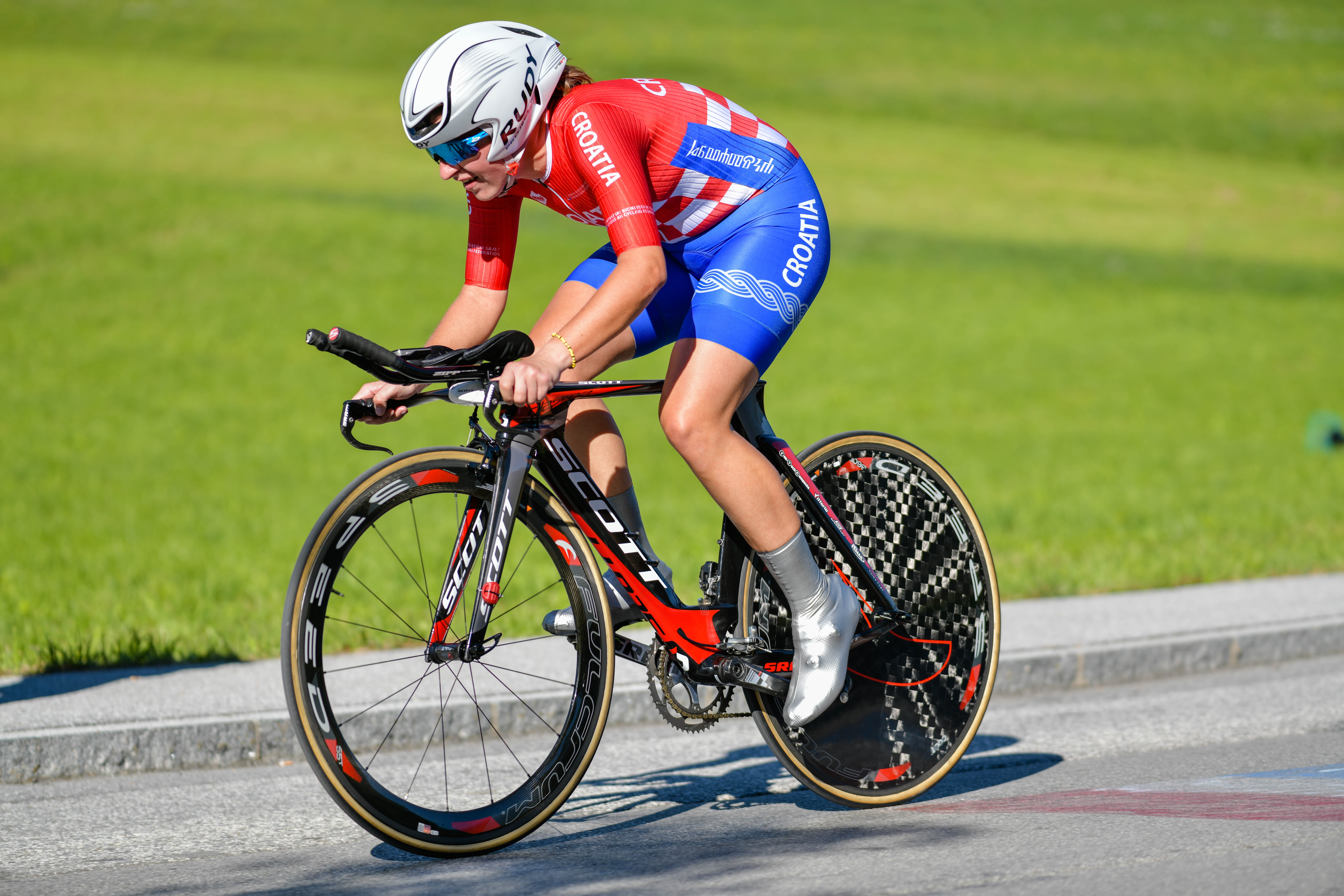
Radotić on 2018 UCI Road World Championships, Innsbruck

== Major results ==
2009
National Road Championships

1st Time trial
2nd Road race

2010
2nd Road race, National Road Championships
2011
National Road Championships

1st Road race
1st Time trial

2nd National Cyclo-cross Championships
2012
National Road Championships

1st Road race
1st Time trial

1st National Cyclo-cross Championships
2013
National Road Championships

1st Time trial
2nd Road race

2nd National Cyclo-cross Championships
2014
National Road Championships

1st Road race
1st Time trial

1st National Cyclo-cross Championships
9th Grand Prix de Dottignies
2015
National Road Championships

1st Road race
1st Time trial

8th Novilon Eurocup
2016
National Road Championships

1st Road race
1st Time trial

7th SwissEver GP Cham-Hagendorn
8th Ronde van Gelderland
9th Grand Prix de Dottignies
2017
National Road Championships

1st Road race
1st Time trial

5th Tour of Guangxi
8th Pajot Hills Classic
2018
National Road Championships

1st Road race
1st Time trial

10th Ljubljana–Domžale–Ljubljana TT
2019
National Road Championships

1st Time trial
2nd Road race

1st National Cyclo-cross Championships
2020
National Road Championships

1st Time trial
2nd Road race

2021
National Road Championships

1st Time trial
2nd Road race

2022
National Road Championships

1st Time trial
2nd Road race
