= Martin Cotar =

Croatian cyclist

Martin Čotar
Personal information
- Born: 10 July 1977 (age 49) Pazin, Croatia

Cycling career
- Sport: Cycling
- Discipline: Road
- Role: Rider

Amateur teams
- 1998–1999: Sava Kranj
- 2002: Sava Kranj
- 2005–2006: Puris-Kamen
- 2008: BK Kalorija

Professional team
- 2000–2001: Post Swiss Team

Martin Čotar (born 10 July 1977 in Pazin) is a Croatian cyclist. He is a five-time national time trial champion and two time national road race champion. His sporting career began with Sava Kranj.

== Major results ==
1996
1st National Road Race Championships
1997
2nd National Time Trial Championships
1998
2nd National Road Race Championships
1999
1st World Military Time Trial Championships
1st U23 European Time Trial Championships
1st National Road Race Championships
1st National Time Trial Championships
2000
1st National Time Trial Championships
2001
1st National Time Trial Championships
9th Overall Bayern Rundfahrt
2002
1st National Time Trial Championships
2nd National Road Race Championships
3rd Overall The Paths of King Nikola

1st Stage 1

2005
1st National Time Trial Championships
2008
3rd National Time Trial Championships
