= Marina Boduljak =

Croatian cyclist

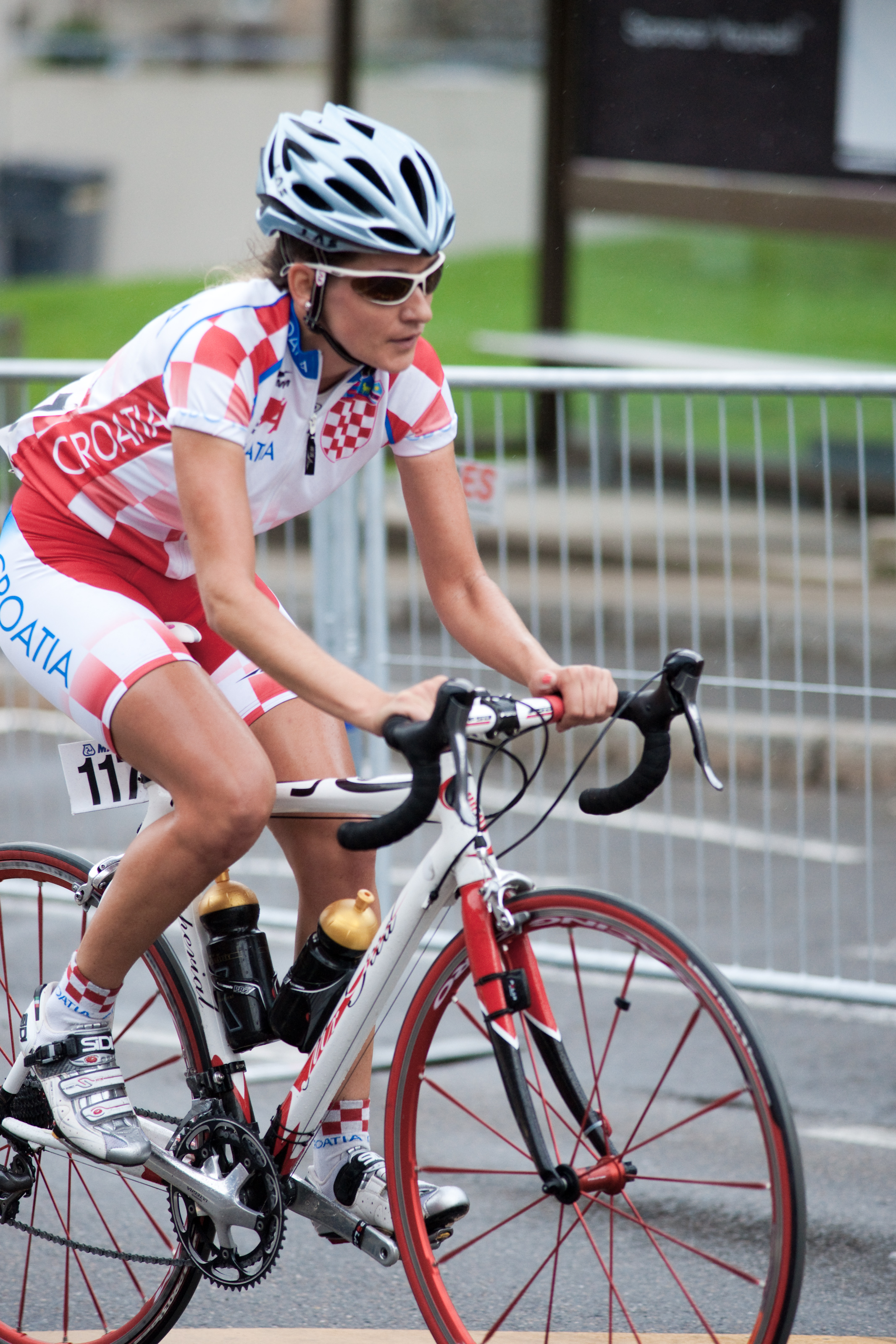
- Boduljak at the 2009 UCI Road World Championships

Personal information
- Born: Croatia

Cycling career
- Sport: Cycling
- Discipline: Road cycling

Marina Boduljak is a road cyclist from Croatia. She represented her nation at the 2009 UCI Road World Championships.
