= Maja Marukic =

Croatian cyclist

Personal information
- Born: Croatia

Cycling career
- Sport: Cycling
- Discipline: Road cycling

Maja Marukic is a road cyclist from Croatia. She represented her nation at the 2009 UCI Road World Championships, 2010 UCI Road World Championships and 2011 UCI Road World Championships.
