= Robert Kišerlovski =

Croatian cyclist

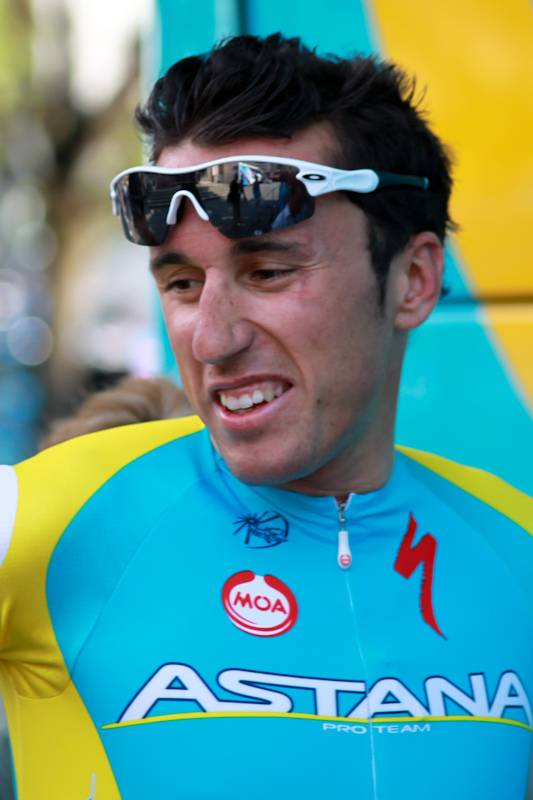
- Kiserlovski in the Tour de Romandie 2011

Personal information
- Full name: Robert Kišerlovski
- Born: 9 August 1986 (age 40) Čačak, SR Serbia SFR Yugoslavia
- Height: 1.79 m (5 ft 10 1/2 in)
- Weight: 65 kg (143 lb)

Cycling career
- Sport: Cycling
- Current team: Retired
- Discipline: Road
- Role: Rider
- Rider type: Climbing specialist

Professional teams
- 2005–2008: KRKA–Adria Mobil
- 2009: Amica Chips–Knauf
- 2009: Fuji–Servetto
- 2010: Liquigas–Doimo
- 2011–2012: Astana
- 2013–2014: RadioShack–Leopard
- 2015–2016: Tinkoff–Saxo
- 2017–2018: Team Katusha–Alpecin

Major wins
- One-Day Races and Classics National Road Race Championship (2013)

Robert Kišerlovski (born 9 August 1986) is a Croatian former professional road bicycle racer, who competed professionally between 2005 and 2018 for the Adria Mobil, Amica Chips–Knauf, Fuji–Servetto, Liquigas–Doimo, Astana, Trek Factory Racing, Tinkoff and Team Katusha–Alpecin squads.

== Career ==
At the 2011 Paris–Nice, Kišerlovski crashed on a slippery downhill and slid underneath a parked truck, being caught underneath it for several minutes and needing eight stitches.

On Stage 14 of the 2012 Tour de France Kišerlovski came off the worst when the road was sabotaged with tacks. Kišerlovski crashed, breaking his collarbone, and was left having to abandon the race. The injury forced him to miss the Summer Olympics in London.

Kišerlovski left Astana at the end of the 2012 season, and joined RadioShack–Leopard on a two-year contract from the 2013 season onwards. In September 2014 it was announced that he would be joining Tinkoff–Saxo at the start of 2015 on a two-year contract with a view to riding as a domestique for riders such as Alberto Contador.

He is the brother of fellow racing cyclist Emanuel Kišerlovski.

== Major results ==
2005
8th Overall Tour of Slovenia
2006
2nd GP Kranj
4th Overall Tour of Slovenia
2007
1st Gran Premio Palio del Recioto
2008
3rd Overall Tour of Slovenia
5th Overall Istrian Spring Trophy
6th Trofeo Zsšdi
8th Overall Settimana Ciclistica Lombarda
2009
4th Overall Settimana internazionale di Coppi e Bartali
10th Gran Premio Nobili Rubinetterie
2010
1st Giro dell'Appennino
10th Overall Giro d'Italia

1st Stage 4 (TTT)

2011
6th Overall Giro del Trentino
7th Overall Giro di Sardegna
7th Classica Sarda
2012
3rd Road race, National Road Championships
5th La Flèche Wallonne
7th Overall Volta a Catalunya
9th Overall Paris–Nice
9th Grand Prix of Aargau Canton
2013
1st Road race, National Road Championships
2014
7th Overall Tirreno–Adriatico
10th Overall Volta a Catalunya
10th Overall Giro d'Italia
2018
4th Overall Tour de Yorkshire

=== Grand Tour general classification results timeline ===
Grand Tour	2009	2010	2011	2012	2013	2014	2015	2016	2017	2018
Giro d'Italia	—	10	42	—	14	10	—	—	31	—
Tour de France	—	—	—	DNF	—	—	—	58	31	DNF
Vuelta a España	DNF	—	18	—	17	—	—	DNF	—	—

Legend
—	Did not compete
DNF	Did not finish
