= Umag Classic =

Croatian one-day road cycling race

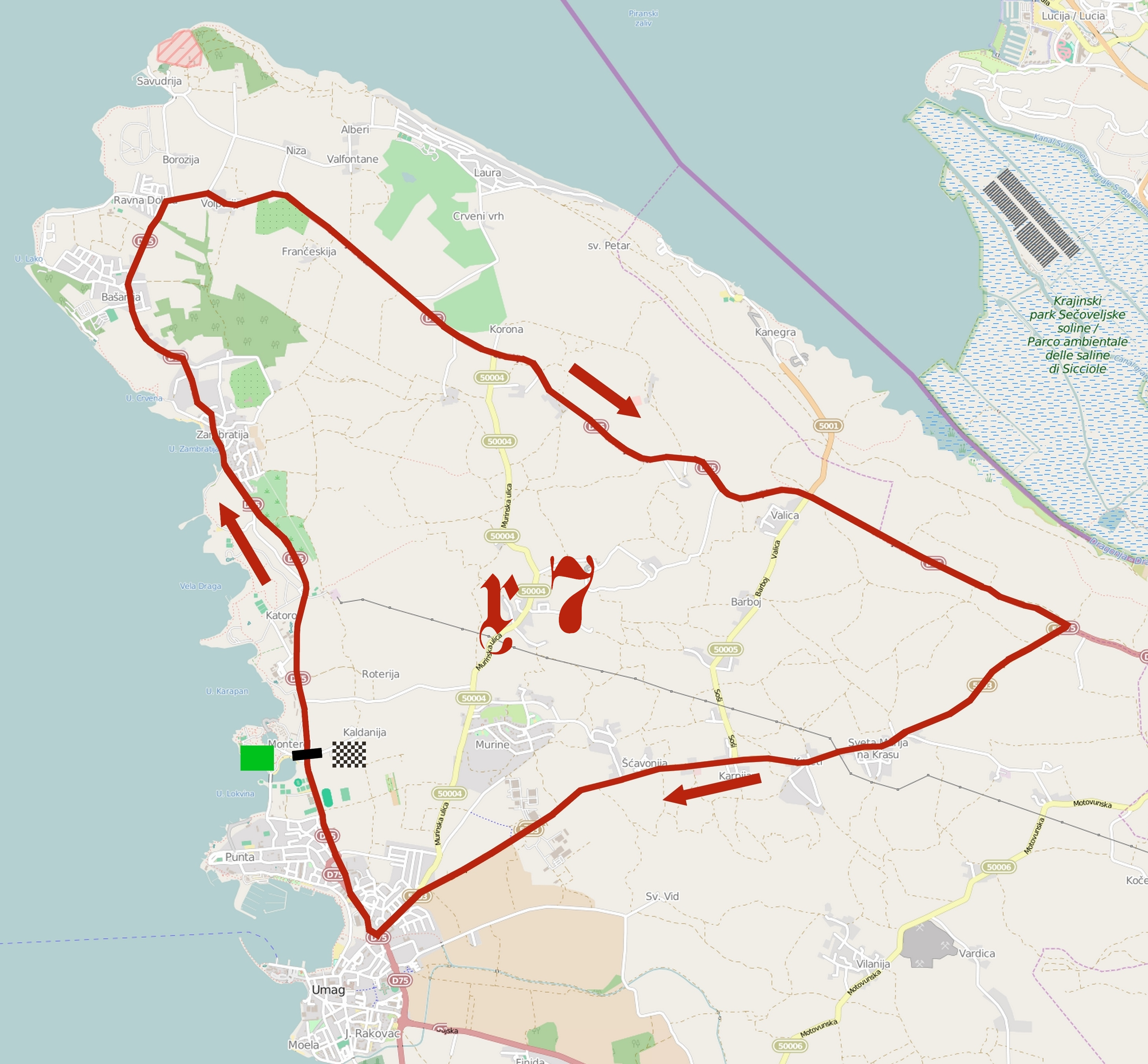

Race details
- Date: Early March
- Region: Croatia
- Discipline: Road
- Type: One day race

History
- First edition: 2013
- Editions: 14 (as of 2026)
- First winner: Aljaž Hočevar (SLO)
- Most wins: No repeat winners
- Most recent: Adam Bradáč (CZE); Dušan Rajović (SRB)

The Umag Classic (formerly known as the Umag Trophy or Trofej Umag) is a men's one-day cycle race, which takes place in Croatia. It is rated by the UCI as category 1.2 event, forming part of the UCI Europe Tour.

== Overall winners ==
Year	Country	Rider	Team
2013	Slovenia	Aljaž Hočevar	Adria Mobil
2014	Slovenia	Matej Mugerli	Adria Mobil
2015	Slovenia	Marko Kump	Adria Mobil
2016	Germany	Jonas Bokeloh	Klein Constantia
2017	Slovenia	Rok Korošec	Amplatz–BMC
2018	Norway	Krister Hagen	Team Coop
2019	Czech Republic	Alois Kaňkovský	Elkov–Author
2020	Netherlands	Olav Kooij	Jumbo–Visma Development Team
2021	Italy	Jakub Mareczko	Vini Zabù
2022	Austria	Daniel Auer	WSA KTM Graz p/b Leomo
2023	Czech Republic	Adam Ťoupalík	Elkov–Kasper
2024	Great Britain	Matthew Brennan	Visma–Lease a Bike Development
2025	Slovakia	Matthias Schwarzbacher	UAE Team Emirates Gen Z
2026	Czech Republic	Adam Bradáč	Factor Racing
2026	Serbia	Dušan Rajović	Team Solution Tech–Vini Fantini
