= Viena Balen =

Croatian cyclist (born 1986)

Personal information
- Born: 18 August 1986 (age 40) Opatija, SR Croatia, SFR Yugoslavia

Cycling career
- Sport: Cycling
- Discipline: Road cycling

Viena Balen (born 18 August 1986) is a road cyclist from Croatia. She represented her nation at the 2007 and 2009 UCI Road World Championships.
