= Trofeo Zsšdi =

Annual road bicycle race in Italy and Slovenia

Race details
- Date: Early-March
- Region: Italy/Slovenia
- English name: Zsšdi Trophy
- Discipline: Road race
- Competition: UCI Europe Tour
- Type: Single-day

History
- First edition: 1977
- Editions: 36 (as of 2012)
- First winner: (Italy) Atos Santarosa
- Most wins: 2 wins: (Italy) Mauro Longo (Italy) Fabio Baldato (Italy) Biagio Conte
- Most recent: (Italy) Patrick Facchini

Trofeo Zsšdi-Unione dei Circoli Sportivi Sloveni in Italia is a road bicycle race held annually in Friuli-Venezia Giulia, Italy. The trophy is contested around Trieste, near the frontier between Italy and Slovenia. Since 2005, it is classified as a 1.2 event on the UCI Europe Tour.

== Winners ==
Year	Country	Rider	Team
1977	Italy	Atos Santarosa	SC Bottecchia
1978	Italy	Pierluigi Sala	La Nuova Baggio-San Siro
1979	Yugoslavia	Ivica Čolig	BK Metalliacommerce
1980	Italy	Francesco Caneva	GS Monti Guerciotti
1981	Italy	Mauro Longo	GS La Tiesse Spinazzè
1982	Italy	Mauro Longo	GS La Tiesse Spinazzè
1983	Yugoslavia	Bruno Bulič	BK Siporex
1984	Italy	Gabriele Ragusa	GS Edy Marino Mainetti
1985	Italy	Federico Ghiotto	GS Fior Glem Gas
1986	Italy	Maurizio Fondriest	GS Glem Gas Cucine Zalf Fior
1987	Italy	Fausto Boreggio	GS Bonlube Q8
1988	Italy	Flavio Milan	SC Caneva Rekord Mobili
1989	Italy	Fabio Baldato	MG Boys-Diadora
1990	Italy	Fabio Baldato	MG Boys-Diadora
1991	Italy	Biagio Conte	MG Boys-Vighini Doni
1992	Italy	Fabio Casartelli	CS Domus 87
1993	Italy	Biagio Conte	GS Prodet
1994	Italy	Sergio Previtali	GS Record Cucine Caneva
1995	Italy	Luca Prada	MG Boys-Vighini Doni
1996	Italy	Giuliano Figueras	Zalf Reomobili Fior Rex
1997	Italy	Simone Simonetti	GS Vini Caldirola
1998	Italy	Flavio Zandarin	UC Trevigiani
1999	Italy	Maurizio Bachini	Gaverina
2000	Czech Republic	Pavel Zerzan	Mg Boys
2001	No race		
2002	Italy	Daniele Pietropolli	Zalf Euromobili
2003	Italy	Alessandro Ballan	Faresin Modal
2004	Italy	Elia Rigotto	Team Parolin VC Bassano
2005	Italy	Maurizio Biondo	GS Promosport
2006	Italy	Marco Bandiera	Zalf Desirée
2007	Italy	Simone Ponzi	Zalf Desirée Fior
2008	Italy	Manuele Boaro	Zalf Desirée Fior
2009	Croatia	Tomislav Dančulović	Loborika
2010	Slovenia	Marko Kump	Adria Mobil
2011	Italy	Enrico Battaglin	Zalf Desirée Fior
2012	Italy	Patrick Facchini	Casati MI Impianti
