= Kamen Pazin =

Croatian cycling team

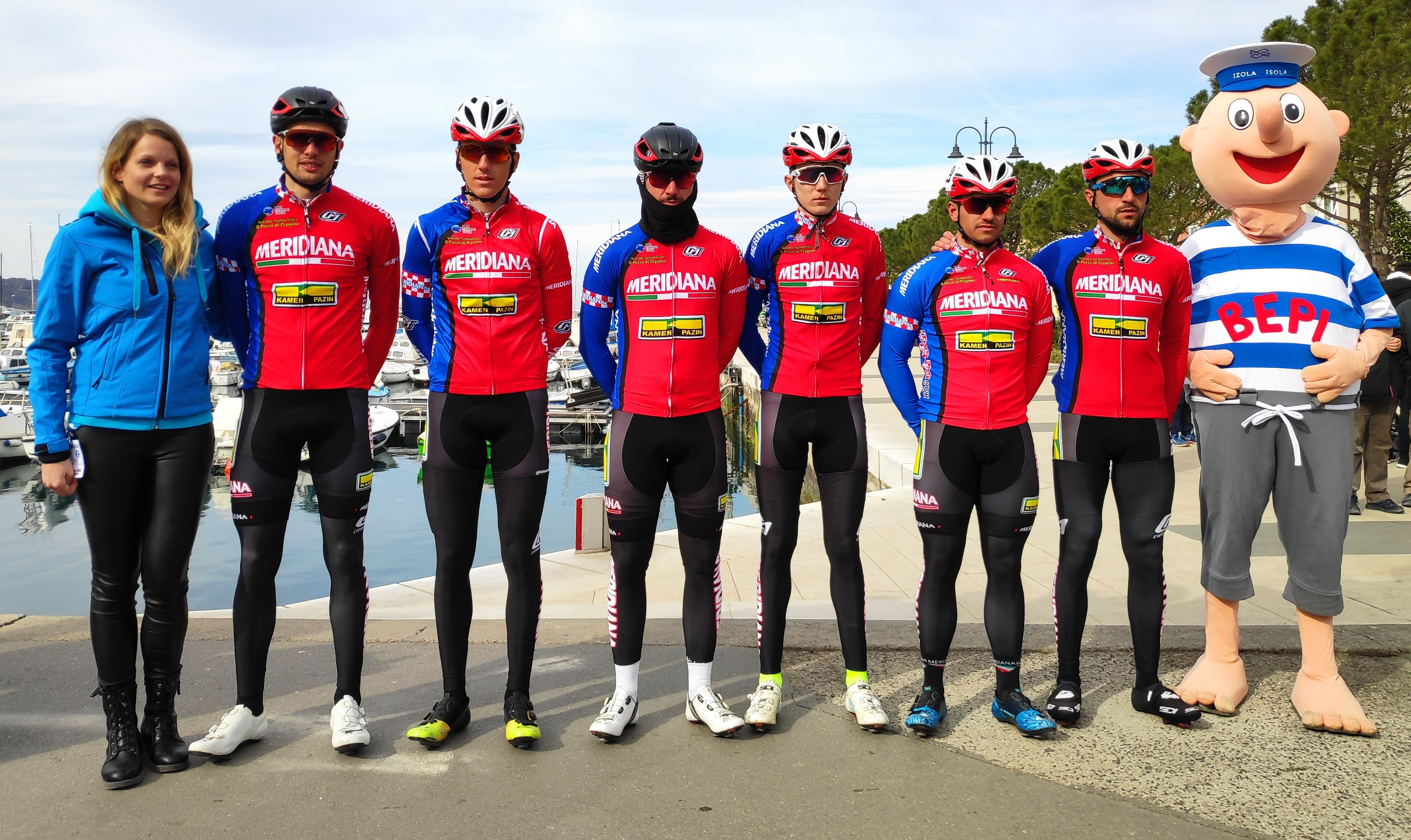

Team information
- UCI code: MKT
- Registered: Italy (2009); Croatia (2010– )
- Founded: 2009
- Discipline: Road
- Status: UCI Continental (2009–2022); Club (2023–)

Key personnel
- General manager: Ivica Gržinić
- Team managers: Antonio Giallorenzo; Mariano Giallorenzo; Vinko Polončič

Team name history
- 2009 2010 2011–2022 2023 2024–: Meridiana–Kalev Chocolate Team; Team Meridiana–Kamen; Meridiana–Kamen; Kamen Team; Kamen Pazin

Kamen Pazin is a Croatian road cycling team founded in 2009. The team competed as a UCI Continental team until 2023, when it stepped down to club level.

== Team roster ==
As of 23 February 2022.

Rider	Date of birth
Antonio Barać (CRO)	19 January 1997 (age 29)
Matija Beđić (CRO)	13 November 1995 (age 30)
Matteo Bertrand (ITA)	16 February 1994 (age 32)
Gregor Černe (SLO)	20 May 1998 (age 28)
Jovan Divnić (SRB)	25 April 2002 (age 24)
Vedad Karić (BIH)	6 March 1988 (age 38)

Rider	Date of birth
Stevan Klisurić (SRB)	8 June 1989 (age 37)
Filip Kvasina (CRO)	29 October 1998 (age 27)
Lorenzo Marenzi (CRO)	8 October 1998 (age 27)
Matteo Rabottini (ITA)	14 August 1987 (age 39)
Marko Vujević (CRO)	26 February 1999 (age 27)

== Major wins ==
2012
Stages 2 & 5 International Tour of Hellas, Enrico Rossi
Stage 4 International Tour of Hellas, Roberto Cesaro
Overall Okolo Slovenska

Stages 1 & 4, Enrico Rossi
Stage 2, Davide Rebellin

Stage 2 Tour de Serbie, Enrico Rossi
Stage 1 Giro di Padania, Enrico Rossi
Overall Tour du Gévaudan Languedoc - Roussillon, Davide Rebellin

Stage 2, Davide Rebellin

2013
Stage 2 Istrian Spring Trophy, Patrik Sinkewitz
Overall Settimana Ciclistica Lombarda, Patrik Sinkewitz

Stages 1 & 2, Patrik Sinkewitz

== National champions ==
2015
Croatia Road Race Emanuel Kišerlovski
2021
Bosnia and Herzegovina Time Trial Vedad Karic
Bosnia and Herzegovina Road Race Vedad Karic
