= Loborika Favorit Team =

Team information
- UCI code: LOB
- Registered: Croatia
- Founded: 2009
- Disbanded: 2012
- Discipline: Road
- Status: UCI Continental
- Bicycles: Carnielli

Key personnel
- General manager: Luciano Valčić
- Team manager: Dean Vitasović

Team name history
- 2009–2010 2011–2012: Loborika; Loborika Favorit Team

Loborika Favorit Team was a Croatian UCI Continental cycling team that existed from 2009 until 2012.
