= List of rosters for Gaseosas Glacial–Selle Italia and its successors =

This is list of rosters for the UCI Pro-Continental team GW Erco SportFitness by season.

== 2022 ==
As of 5 February 2022.

Rider	Date of birth
Juan Diego Alba (COL)	11 September 1997 (age 28)
Mattia Bais (ITA)	19 October 1996 (age 29)
Gabriele Benedetti (ITA)	9 June 2000 (age 25)
Alessandro Bisolti (ITA)	7 March 1985 (age 41)
Jefferson Alexander Cepeda (ECU)	16 June 1998 (age 27)
Luca Chirico (ITA)	16 July 1992 (age 33)
Eduard-Michael Grosu (ROM)	4 September 1992 (age 33)
Trym Westgaard Holther (NOR)	9 July 2003 (age 22)
Umberto Marengo (ITA)	21 July 1992 (age 33)
Leonardo Marchiori (ITA)	13 June 1998 (age 27)
Didier Merchán (COL)	26 July 1999 (age 26)
Daniel Muñoz (COL)	21 November 1996 (age 29)

Rider	Date of birth
Andrii Ponomar (UKR)	5 September 2002 (age 23)
Simone Ravanelli (ITA)	4 July 1995 (age 30)
Jhonatan Restrepo (COL)	28 November 1994 (age 31)
Brandon Alejandro Rojas (COL)	2 July 2002 (age 23)
Eduardo Sepúlveda (ARG)	13 June 1991 (age 34)
Filippo Tagliani (ITA)	14 August 1995 (age 30)
Natnael Tesfatsion (ERI)	23 May 1999 (age 26)
Santiago Umba (COL)	20 November 2002 (age 23)
Martí Vigo del Arco (ESP)	22 December 1997 (age 28)
Edoardo Zardini (ITA)	2 November 1989 (age 36)
Ricardo Alejandro Zurita (ESP)	10 November 2001 (age 24)

== 2021 ==
As of 7 January 2021.

Rider	Date of birth
Mattia Bais (ITA)	19 October 1996 (age 29)
Alessandro Bisolti (ITA)	7 March 1985 (age 41)
Jefferson Alexander Cepeda (ECU)	16 June 1998 (age 27)
Luca Chirico (ITA)	16 July 1992 (age 33)
Žiga Jerman (SLO)	26 June 1998 (age 27)
Matteo Malucelli (ITA)	20 October 1993 (age 32)
Leonardo Marchiori (ITA)	13 June 1998 (age 27)
Daniel Muñoz (COL)	21 November 1996 (age 29)
János Pelikán (HUN)	19 April 1995 (age 30)
Simon Pellaud (SUI)	6 November 1992 (age 33)
Andrii Ponomar (UKR)	5 September 2002 (age 23)

Rider	Date of birth
Simone Ravanelli (ITA)	4 July 1995 (age 30)
Jhonatan Restrepo (COL)	28 November 1994 (age 31)
Josip Rumac (CRO)	26 October 1994 (age 31)
Eduardo Sepúlveda (ARG)	13 June 1991 (age 34)
Filippo Tagliani (ITA)	14 August 1995 (age 30)
Natnael Tesfatsion (ERI)	23 May 1999 (age 26)
Santiago Umba (COL)	20 November 2002 (age 23)
Nicola Venchiarutti (ITA)	7 October 1998 (age 27)
Mattia Viel (ITA)	22 April 1995 (age 30)
Martí Vigo del Arco (ESP)	22 December 1997 (age 28)

== 2020 ==
As of 13 August 2020.

Rider	Date of birth
Nicola Bagioli (ITA)	19 February 1995 (age 31)
Mattia Bais (ITA)	19 October 1996 (age 29)
Manuel Belletti (ITA)	14 October 1985 (age 40)
Alessandro Bisolti (ITA)	7 March 1985 (age 41)
Jefferson Cepeda (ECU)	16 June 1998 (age 27)
Luca Chirico (ITA)	16 July 1992 (age 33)
Miguel Flórez (COL)	21 February 1996 (age 30)
Mattia Frapporti (ITA)	2 July 1994 (age 31)
Davide Gabburo (ITA)	1 April 1993 (age 33)
Francesco Gavazzi (ITA)	1 August 1984 (age 41)

Rider	Date of birth
Daniel Muñoz (COL)	21 November 1996 (age 29)
Luca Pacioni (ITA)	13 August 1993 (age 32)
János Pelikán (HUN)	19 April 1995 (age 30)
Simon Pellaud (SUI)	6 November 1992 (age 33)
Simone Ravanelli (ITA)	4 July 1995 (age 30)
Jhonatan Restrepo (COL)	28 November 1994 (age 31)
Kevin Rivera (CRC)	28 June 1998 (age 27)
Josip Rumac (CRO)	26 October 1994 (age 31)
Nicola Venchiarutti (ITA)	7 October 1998 (age 27)
Mattia Viel (ITA)	22 April 1995 (age 30)

== 2019 ==
As of 24 January 2019.

Rider	Date of birth
Manuel Belletti (ITA)	14 October 1985 (age 40)
Marco Benfatto (ITA)	6 January 1988 (age 38)
Alessandro Bisolti (ITA)	7 March 1985 (age 41)
Matteo Busato (ITA)	20 December 1987 (age 38)
Julián Cardona (COL)	19 January 1997 (age 29)
Mattia Cattaneo (ITA)	25 October 1990 (age 35)
Leonardo Fedrigo (ITA)	21 July 1996 (age 29)
Miguel Flórez (COL)	21 February 1996 (age 30)
Marco Frapporti (ITA)	30 March 1985 (age 41)
Mattia Frapporti (ITA)	2 July 1994 (age 31)

Rider	Date of birth
Francesco Gavazzi (ITA)	1 August 1984 (age 41)
Fausto Masnada (ITA)	6 November 1993 (age 32)
Matteo Montaguti (ITA)	6 January 1984 (age 42)
Daniel Muñoz (COL)	21 November 1996 (age 29)
Matteo Pelucchi (ITA)	21 January 1989 (age 37)
Kevin Rivera (CRC)	28 June 1998 (age 27)
Josip Rumac (CRO)	26 October 1994 (age 31)
Matteo Spreafico (ITA)	15 February 1993 (age 33)
Andrea Vendrame (ITA)	20 July 1994 (age 31)
Mattia Viel (ITA)	22 April 1995 (age 30)

== 2018 ==
As of 5 January 2018.

Rider	Date of birth
Davide Ballerini (ITA)	21 September 1994 (age 31)
Manuel Belletti (ITA)	14 October 1985 (age 40)
Marco Benfatto (ITA)	6 January 1988 (age 38)
Alessandro Bisolti (ITA)	7 March 1985 (age 41)
Raffaello Bonusi (ITA)	31 January 1992 (age 34)
Mattia Cattaneo (ITA)	25 October 1990 (age 35)
Luca Chirico (ITA)	16 July 1992 (age 33)
Marco Frapporti (ITA)	30 March 1985 (age 41)
Mattia Frapporti (ITA)	2 July 1994 (age 31)

Rider	Date of birth
Francesco Gavazzi (ITA)	1 August 1984 (age 41)
Matteo Malucelli (ITA)	20 October 1993 (age 32)
Fausto Masnada (ITA)	6 November 1993 (age 32)
Kevin Rivera (CRC)	28 June 1998 (age 27)
Iván Sosa (COL)	31 October 1997 (age 28)
Matteo Spreafico (ITA)	15 February 1993 (age 33)
Rodolfo Torres (COL)	21 March 1987 (age 39)
Andrea Vendrame (ITA)	20 July 1994 (age 31)

== 2017 ==
Rider	Date of birth
Davide Ballerini (ITA)	21 September 1994 (age 31)
Marco Benfatto (ITA)	6 January 1988 (age 38)
Egan Bernal (COL)	13 January 1997 (age 29)
Raffaello Bonusi (ITA)	31 January 1992 (age 34)
Mattia Cattaneo (ITA)	25 October 1990 (age 35)
Marco Frapporti (ITA)	30 March 1985 (age 41)
Mattia Frapporti (ITA)	2 July 1994 (age 31)
Francesco Gavazzi (ITA)	1 August 1984 (age 41)
Matteo Malucelli (ITA)	20 October 1993 (age 32)

Rider	Date of birth
Fausto Masnada (ITA)	6 November 1993 (age 32)
Luca Pacioni (ITA)	13 August 1993 (age 32)
Andrea Palini (ITA)	16 June 1989 (age 36)
Kevin Rivera (CRC)	28 June 1998 (age 27)
Iván Sosa (COL)	31 October 1997 (age 28)
Matteo Spreafico (ITA)	15 February 1993 (age 33)
Alessio Taliani (ITA)	11 October 1990 (age 35)
Rodolfo Torres (COL)	21 March 1987 (age 39)
Andrea Vendrame (ITA)	30 July 1994 (age 31)

== 2016 ==
Roster in 2016, age as of 1 January 2016:

Rider	Date of birth
Marco Bandiera (ITA)	12 June 1984 (aged 31)
Marco Benfatto (ITA)	6 January 1988 (aged 27)
Egan Bernal (COL)	13 January 1997 (aged 18)
Raffaello Bonusi (ITA)	31 January 1992 (aged 23)
Giorgio Cecchinel (ITA)	24 June 1989 (aged 26)
Francesco Chicchi (ITA)	27 November 1980 (aged 35)
Tiziano Dall'Antonia (ITA)	26 July 1983 (aged 32)
Mattia De Marchi (ITA)	3 June 1991 (aged 24)
Marco Frapporti (ITA)	30 March 1985 (aged 30)
Rino Gasparrini (ITA)	8 April 1992 (aged 23)

Rider	Date of birth
Francesco Gavazzi (ITA)	1 August 1984 (aged 31)
Alberto Nardin (ITA)	30 April 1990 (aged 25)
Luca Pacioni (ITA)	13 August 1993 (aged 22)
Franco Pellizotti (ITA)	15 January 1978 (aged 37)
Daniele Ratto (ITA)	5 October 1989 (aged 26)
Mirko Selvaggi (ITA)	11 February 1985 (aged 30)
Alessio Taliani (ITA)	11 October 1990 (aged 25)
Rodolfo Torres (COL)	21 March 1987 (aged 28)
Serghei Țvetcov (ROM)	29 December 1988 (aged 27)
Davide Viganò (ITA)	12 June 1984 (aged 31)

== 2015 ==
Rider	Date of birth
Davide Appollonio (ITA)	2 June 1989 (age 36)
Marco Bandiera (ITA)	12 June 1984 (age 41)
Marco Benfatto (ITA)	6 January 1988 (age 38)
Tiziano Dall'Antonia (ITA)	26 July 1983 (age 42)
John Kronborg Ebsen (DEN)	15 November 1988 (age 37)
Marco Frapporti (ITA)	30 March 1985 (age 41)
Carlos Gálviz (VEN)	27 October 1989 (age 36)
Oscar Gatto (ITA)	1 January 1985 (age 41)
Yonder Godoy (VEN)	19 April 1993 (age 32)
Carlos Gimenez (VEN)	7 May 1995 (age 30)

Rider	Date of birth
Alberto Nardin (ITA)	30 April 1990 (age 35)
Franco Pellizotti (ITA)	15 January 1978 (age 48)
Jackson Rodríguez (VEN)	25 February 1985 (age 41)
Emanuele Sella (ITA)	9 January 1981 (age 45)
Simone Stortoni (ITA)	7 July 1985 (age 40)
Fabio Taborre (ITA)	5 June 1985 (age 40)
Alessio Taliani (ITA)	11 October 1990 (age 35)
Serghei Țvetcov (ROU)	29 December 1988 (age 37)
Gianfranco Zilioli (ITA)	5 March 1990 (age 36)
Andrea Zordan (ITA)	11 July 1992 (age 33)

== 2014 ==
As of 1 April 2014.

Rider	Date of birth
Marco Bandiera (ITA)	12 June 1984 (age 41)
Manuel Belletti (ITA)	14 October 1985 (age 40)
Omar Bertazzo (ITA)	7 January 1989 (age 37)
Matteo Di Serafino (ITA)	27 August 1986 (age 39)
Patrick Facchini (ITA)	28 January 1988 (age 38)
Marco Frapporti (ITA)	30 March 1985 (age 41)
Yonder Godoy (VEN)	19 April 1993 (age 32)
Johnny Hoogerland (NED)	13 May 1983 (age 42)
Carlos José Ochoa (VEN)	14 December 1980 (age 45)
Antonino Parrinello (ITA)	2 October 1988 (age 37)

Rider	Date of birth
Franco Pellizotti (ITA)	15 January 1978 (age 48)
Jackson Rodríguez (VEN)	25 February 1985 (age 41)
Diego Rosa (ITA)	27 March 1989 (age 37)
Emanuele Sella (ITA)	9 January 1981 (age 45)
Alessio Taliani (ITA)	11 October 1990 (age 35)
Nicola Testi (ITA)	29 April 1990 (age 35)
Kenny van Hummel (NED)	30 September 1982 (age 43)
Gianfranco Zilioli (ITA)	5 March 1990 (age 36)
Andrea Zordan (ITA)	11 July 1992 (age 33)

== 2013 ==
As of 1 January 2013.

Rider	Date of birth
Omar Bertazzo (ITA)	7 January 1989 (age 37)
Riccardo Chiarini (ITA)	20 February 1984 (age 42)
Matteo Di Serafino (ITA)	27 August 1986 (age 39)
Giairo Ermeti (ITA)	7 April 1981 (age 45)
Patrick Facchini (ITA)	28 January 1988 (age 38)
Fabio Felline (ITA)	29 March 1990 (age 36)
Marco Frapporti (ITA)	30 March 1985 (age 41)
Mattia Gavazzi (ITA)	14 June 1983 (age 42)
Tomás Gil (VEN)	23 May 1977 (age 48)

Rider	Date of birth
Alessandro Malaguti (ITA)	22 September 1987 (age 38)
Carlos José Ochoa (VEN)	14 December 1980 (age 45)
Antonino Parrinello (ITA)	2 October 1988 (age 37)
Franco Pellizotti (ITA)	15 January 1978 (age 48)
Francesco Reda (ITA)	19 November 1982 (age 43)
Jackson Rodríguez (VEN)	25 February 1985 (age 41)
Diego Rosa (ITA)	27 March 1989 (age 37)
Miguel Ángel Rubiano (COL)	3 October 1984 (age 41)
Emanuele Sella (ITA)	9 January 1981 (age 45)

== 2012 ==
As of 8 May 2012.

Rider	Date of birth
Omar Bertazzo (ITA)	7 January 1989 (age 37)
Riccardo Chiarini (ITA)	20 February 1984 (age 42)
Alessandro De Marchi (ITA)	19 May 1986 (age 39)
Giairo Ermeti (ITA)	7 April 1981 (age 45)
Fabio Felline (ITA)	29 March 1990 (age 36)
Roberto Ferrari (ITA)	9 March 1983 (age 43)
Tomás Gil (VEN)	23 May 1977 (age 48)
Salvatore Mancuso (ITA)	5 February 1986 (age 40)
Jonathan Monsalve (VEN)	28 June 1989 (age 36)
Francisco Moreno (ESP)	10 April 1989 (age 37)

Rider	Date of birth
Carlos José Ochoa (VEN)	14 December 1980 (age 45)
Antonino Parrinello (ITA)	2 October 1988 (age 37)
Franco Pellizotti (ITA)	15 January 1978 (age 48)
Jackson Rodríguez (VEN)	25 February 1985 (age 41)
Miguel Ángel Rubiano (COL)	3 October 1984 (age 41)
José Rujano (VEN)	18 February 1982 (age 44)
Antonio Santoro (ITA)	9 October 1989 (age 36)
Emanuele Sella (ITA)	9 January 1981 (age 45)
José Serpa (COL)	17 April 1979 (age 46)
Miguel Ubeto (VEN)	2 September 1976 (age 49)

== 2011 ==
As of January 1, 2011.

Rider	Date of birth
Luca Barla (ITA)	September 29, 1987 (age 38)
Omar Bertazzo (ITA)	January 7, 1989 (age 37)
Alessandro Bertolini (ITA)	July 27, 1971 (age 54)
Riccardo Chiarini (ITA)	February 20, 1984 (age 42)
Crescenzo D'Amore (ITA)	April 2, 1979 (age 47)
Giairo Ermeti (ITA)	April 7, 1981 (age 45)
Roberto Ferrari (ITA)	March 9, 1983 (age 43)
Francesco Ginanni (ITA)	October 6, 1985 (age 40)
Alessandro De Marchi (ITA)	May 19, 1986 (age 39)

Rider	Date of birth
Jonathan Monsalve (VEN)	June 28, 1989 (age 36)
Carlos José Ochoa (VEN)	December 14, 1980 (age 45)
Jackson Rodríguez (VEN)	February 25, 1985 (age 41)
José Rujano (VEN)	February 18, 1982 (age 44)
Antonio Santoro (ITA)	October 9, 1989 (age 36)
Emanuele Sella (ITA)	January 9, 1981 (age 45)
José Serpa (COL)	April 17, 1979 (age 46)
Luca Solari (ITA)	October 2, 1979 (age 46)
Ángel Vicioso (ESP)	April 13, 1977 (age 49)

== 2010 ==
As of January 1, 2010.

Rider	Date of birth
Leonardo Bertagnolli (ITA)	January 8, 1978 (age 48)
Rubens Bertogliati (SUI)	May 9, 1979 (age 46)
Alessandro Bertolini (ITA)	July 27, 1971 (age 54)
Thomas Bertolini (ITA)	July 10, 1988 (age 37)
Francesco Ginanni (ITA)	October 6, 1985 (age 40)
~~Massimo Giunti~~ (ITA)	July 29, 1974 (age 51)
Alberto Loddo (ITA)	January 5, 1979 (age 47)
Damiano Margutti (ITA)	March 7, 1986 (age 40)
Luis Maté (ESP)	March 23, 1984 (age 42)

Rider	Date of birth
Carlos José Ochoa (VEN)	December 14, 1980 (age 45)
Fabrice Piemontesi (ITA)	August 16, 1983 (age 42)
Jackson Rodríguez (VEN)	February 25, 1985 (age 41)
Michele Scarponi (ITA)	September 25, 1979 (age 46)
José Serpa (COL)	April 17, 1979 (age 46)
Luca Solari (ITA)	October 2, 1979 (age 46)
Fabio Taborre (ITA)	June 5, 1985 (age 40)
Cameron Wurf (AUS)	August 3, 1983 (age 42)

== 2009 ==
As of March 4, 2009.

Rider	Date of birth
Manuel Belletti (ITA)	October 14, 1985 (age 40)
Alessandro Bertolini (ITA)	July 27, 1971 (age 54)
Denis Bertolini (ITA)	December 13, 1977 (age 48)
Thomas Bertolini (ITA)	July 10, 1988 (age 37)
Francesco De Bonis (ITA)	April 14, 1982 (age 43)
Roberto Cobo (ESP)	November 3, 1982 (age 43)
Emiliano Donadello (ITA)	April 19, 1983 (age 42)
Francesco Ginanni (ITA)	October 6, 1985 (age 40)
Raffaele Illiano (ITA)	February 11, 1977 (age 49)
Alberto Loddo (ITA)	January 5, 1979 (age 47)

Rider	Date of birth
Leonardo Moser (ITA)	September 25, 1984 (age 41)
Carlos José Ochoa (VEN)	December 14, 1980 (age 45)
Richard Ochoa (VEN)	February 14, 1984 (age 42)
Davide Rebellin (ITA)	August 9, 1971 (age 54)
Jackson Rodríguez (VEN)	February 25, 1985 (age 41)
Nazareno Rossi (SUI)	April 3, 1985 (age 41)
José Serpa (COL)	April 17, 1979 (age 46)
Fabio Taborre (ITA)	June 5, 1985 (age 40)
Michele Scarponi (ITA)	September 25, 1979 (age 46)
Gilberto Simoni (ITA)	August 25, 1971 (age 54)
Luca Solari (ITA)	October 2, 1979 (age 46)

== 2008 ==
As of February 12, 2008.

Rider	Date of birth
Santo Anzà (ITA)	November 17, 1980 (age 45)
Niklas Axelsson (SWE)	May 15, 1972 (age 53)
Manuel Belletti (ITA)	October 14, 1985 (age 40)
Alessandro Bertolini (ITA)	July 27, 1971 (age 54)
Denis Bertolini (ITA)	December 13, 1977 (age 48)
Roberto Cobo (ESP)	November 3, 1982 (age 43)
Emiliano Donadello (ITA)	April 19, 1983 (age 42)
Francesco Ginanni (ITA)	October 6, 1985 (age 40)
Danilo Hondo (GER)	January 4, 1974 (age 52)
Raffaele Illiano (ITA)	February 11, 1977 (age 49)

Rider	Date of birth
Ruslan Ivanov (MDA)	December 18, 1973 (age 52)
Gabriele Missaglia (ITA)	July 24, 1970 (age 55)
Leonardo Moser (ITA)	September 25, 1984 (age 41)
Daniele Nardello (ITA)	August 2, 1972 (age 53)
Carlos José Ochoa (VEN)	December 14, 1980 (age 45)
Richard Ochoa (VEN)	February 14, 1984 (age 42)
Jackson Rodríguez (VEN)	February 25, 1985 (age 41)
Nazareno Rossi (SUI)	April 3, 1985 (age 41)
Jose Rodolfo Serpa Perez (COL)	April 17, 1979 (age 46)
Gilberto Simoni (ITA)	August 25, 1971 (age 54)

== 2006 ==
Name	Birthdate	Nationality
Domenico Agosta	03.04.1983	Italy
Santo Anzà	17.11.1980	Italy
Niklas Axelsson	15.05.1972	Sweden
Sergio Barbero	17.01.1969	Italy
Wladimir Belli	25.07.1970	Italy
Alessandro Bertolini	27.07.1971	Italy
Armando Camelo	06.01.1981	Italy
Angelo Furlan	21.06.1977	Italy
Mariano Giallorenzo	07.08.1982	Italy
Alexander Giraldo	26.03.1977	Colombia
Fredy González	18.06.1975	Colombia
Raffaele Illiano	11.02.1977	Italy
Alberto Loddo	05.01.1979	Italy
Huberlino Mesa Estepa	12.06.1971	Colombia
Gabriele Missaglia	24.07.1970	Italy
Diego Nosotti	26.07.1982	Italy
Nilton Alexis Ortiz Ortiz	31.10.1983	Colombia
Freddy Paredes	21.09.1974	Colombia
Walter Pedraza	27.11.1981	Colombia
Andrei Sartassov	10.11.1975	Russia
Philippe Schnyder	17.03.1978	Switzerland
José Serpa	17.04.1979	Colombia
Edgardo Simón	16.12.1974	Argentina
Rolando Trujillo Caballero	16.07.1978	Colombia
