= 2021 Androni Giocattoli–Sidermec season =

Androni Giocattoli–Sidermec
- 2021 season
- UCI code: ANS
- Status: UCI ProTeam
- Manager: Gianni Savio (ITA)
- Based: Italy
- Bicycles: Bottecchia
- Groupset: Shimano

Season victories
- Stage race overall: 1
- Stage race stages: 9
- National Championships: 2
- Most wins: Jefferson Alexander Cepeda (ECU) (5)
- Best ranked rider: Jhonatan Restrepo (COL) (182nd)

The 2021 season for Androni Giocattoli–Sidermec was the 26th season in the team's existence and the fourth under the current name. The team has been a UCI ProTeam since 2005.

== Team roster ==
As of 11 April 2021.

Rider	Date of birth
Mattia Bais (ITA)	19 October 1996 (aged 24)
Alessandro Bisolti (ITA)	7 March 1985 (aged 35)
Jefferson Alexander Cepeda (ECU)	16 June 1998 (aged 22)
Luca Chirico (ITA)	16 July 1992 (aged 28)
Žiga Jerman (SLO)	26 June 1998 (aged 22)
Matteo Malucelli (ITA)	20 October 1993 (aged 27)
Leonardo Marchiori (ITA)	13 June 1998 (aged 22)
Daniel Muñoz (COL)	21 November 1996 (aged 24)
János Pelikán (HUN)	19 April 1995 (aged 25)
Simon Pellaud (SUI)	6 November 1992 (aged 28)
Andrii Ponomar (UKR)	5 September 2002 (aged 18)

Rider	Date of birth
Simone Ravanelli (ITA)	4 July 1995 (aged 25)
Jhonatan Restrepo (COL)	28 November 1994 (aged 26)
Josip Rumac (CRO)	26 October 1994 (aged 26)
Eduardo Sepúlveda (ARG)	13 June 1991 (aged 29)
Filippo Tagliani (ITA)	14 August 1995 (aged 25)
Natnael Tesfatsion (ERI)	23 May 1999 (aged 21)
Santiago Umba (COL)	20 November 2002 (aged 18)
Nicola Venchiarutti (ITA)	7 October 1998 (aged 22)
Mattia Viel (ITA)	22 April 1995 (aged 25)
Martí Vigo del Arco (ESP)	22 December 1997 (aged 23)

Riders who joined the team for the 2021 season

Rider	2020 team
Žiga Jerman	neo-pro (Équipe Continentale Groupama–FDJ)
Matteo Malucelli	Caja Rural–Seguros RGA
Leonardo Marchiori	neo-pro (NTT Continental Cycling Team)
Andrii Ponomar	neo-pro (Team Franco Ballerini Due C)
Eduardo Sepúlveda	Movistar Team
Filippo Tagliani	Zalf–Euromobil–Désirée–Fior
Natnael Tesfatsion	neo-pro (NTT Continental Cycling Team)
Santiago Umba	neo-pro (Arcabuco–Ingeniería de Vías)
Martí Vigo del Arco	neo-pro (Telcom–On Clima–Osés Const)

Riders who left the team during or after the 2020 season

Rider	2021 team
Nicola Bagioli	B&B Hotels p/b KTM
Manuel Belletti	Eolo–Kometa
Miguel Flórez	Arkéa–Samsic
Mattia Frapporti	Eolo–Kometa
Davide Gabburo	Bardiani–CSF–Faizanè
Francesco Gavazzi	Eolo–Kometa
Luca Pacioni	Eolo–Kometa
Kevin Rivera	Bardiani–CSF–Faizanè
Matteo Spreafico	Vini Zabù

== Season victories ==
Date	Race	Competition	Rider	Country	Location	Ref.
17 January	Vuelta al Táchira, Stage 1	UCI America Tour	Matteo Malucelli (ITA)	Venezuela	El Vigia	
24 January	Vuelta al Táchira, Stage 8	UCI America Tour	Simon Pellaud (SUI)	Venezuela	San Cristóbal	
24 January	Vuelta al Táchira, Young rider classification	UCI America Tour	Santiago Umba (COL)	Venezuela		
23 April	Tour of the Alps, Young rider classification	UCI Europe Tour; UCI ProSeries	Jefferson Alexander Cepeda (ECU)	Austria		
8 May	Tour du Rwanda, Stage 7 (ITT)	UCI Africa Tour	Jhonatan Restrepo (COL)	Rwanda	Kigali (Mur de Kigali)	
30 May	Boucles de la Mayenne, Mountains classification	UCI Europe Tour; UCI ProSeries	Jhonatan Restrepo (COL)	France		
23 July	Tour Alsace, Stage 3	UCI Europe Tour	Santiago Umba (COL)	France	La Planche des Belles Filles	
5 August	Tour de Savoie Mont-Blanc, Stage 1	UCI Europe Tour	Santiago Umba (COL)	France	Praz-sur-Arly	
6 August	Tour de Savoie Mont-Blanc, Stage 2	UCI Europe Tour	Jefferson Alexander Cepeda (ECU)	France	Col du Galibier	
8 August	Tour de Savoie Mont-Blanc, Overall	UCI Europe Tour	Jefferson Alexander Cepeda (ECU)	France		
8 August	Tour de Savoie Mont-Blanc, Points classification	UCI Europe Tour	Jefferson Alexander Cepeda (ECU)	France		
8 August	Tour de Savoie Mont-Blanc, Young rider classification	UCI Europe Tour	Santiago Umba (COL)	France		
8 August	Tour de Savoie Mont-Blanc, Team classification	UCI Europe Tour	(Note: The riders in the squad were Mattia Bais, Jefferson Alexander Cepeda, Luca Chirico, János Pelikán, Simone Ravanelli, and Santiago Umba.)	France		
31 August	Turul Romaniei, Prologue (ITT)	UCI Europe Tour	János Pelikán (HUN)	Romania	Timișoara	
2 September	Turul Romaniei, Stage 2	UCI Europe Tour	Daniel Muñoz (COL)	Romania	Păltiniș	
24 September	Tour de Bretagne, Stage 5	UCI Europe Tour	Leonardo Marchiori (ITA)	France	Boisgervilly	

== National, Continental, and World Champions ==
Date	Discipline	Jersey	Rider	Country	Location	Ref.
18 June	Ecuadorian National Road Race Championships		Jefferson Alexander Cepeda (ECU)	Ecuador	Alto de Aloburo	
20 June	Ukrainian National Road Race Championships		Andrii Ponomar (UKR)	Ukraine		
