= Milano–Busseto =

Single-day bicycle race in Italy

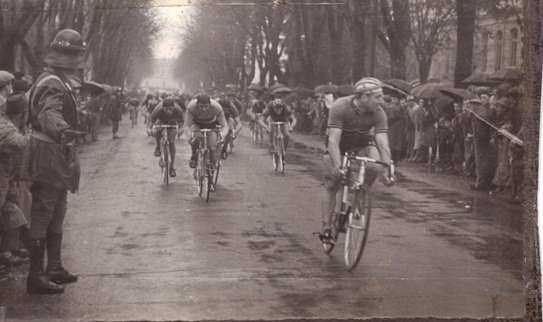
- Sante Gaiardoni winning the 1959 edition of the race

Race details
- Date: March/April
- Region: Emilia-Romagna, Italy
- English name: Milan–Busseto
- Discipline: Road
- Type: Single-day

History
- First edition: 1949
- Editions: 74 (as of 2024)
- First winner: Claudio Ricci (ITA)
- Most wins: Ettore Comellini (ITA); Vittorio Algeri (ITA); Giovanni Lombardi (ITA); Davide Persico (ITA); (2 wins)
- Most recent: Travis Stedman (RSA)

Milano–Busseto is an under-23 road bicycle race held annually in Emilia-Romagna, Italy.

The race is currently part of the national calendar of the Italian Cycling Federation as a category 1.13 event. It is therefore reserved for under-23 year old cyclists.

== Winners ==
Year	Winner	Second	Third
1949	(Italy) Claudio Ricci	(Italy) Loretto Petrucci	
1950	(Italy) Donato Piazza		
1951	(Italy) Giorgio Pavesi		
1952	(Italy) Ettore Comellini		
1953	(Italy) Giuseppe Favero		
1954	(Italy) Eliseo Comellini	(Italy) Germano Marinoni	(Italy) Sergio Semprini
1955	(Italy) Giuseppe Ogna		
1956	(Italy) Remo Tamagni		
1957	(Italy) Nevio Vitali		
1958	(Italy) Carlo Cressari		
1959	(Italy) Sante Gaiardoni		
1960	(Italy) Franco Alberti		
1961	(Italy) Angelo Garda		
1962	(Italy) Sergio Alzani		
1963	(Italy) Giampiero Forti		
1964	(Italy) Luigi Zuccotti		
1965	(Italy) Marco Belletti		
1966	(Italy) Bruno Vittiglio		
1967	(Italy) Giorgio Bedini		
1968	(Italy) Franco Vanzin	(Italy) Agostino Bertagnoli	
1969	(Italy) Enzo Trevisan		
1970	(Italy) Claudio Guarnieri		
1971	(Italy) Francesco Moser		
1972	(Italy) Aldo Parecchini		
1973	(Italy) Vittorio Algeri		
1974	(Italy) Vittorio Algeri		
1975	(Italy) Dino Porrini		
1976	(Italy) Giorgio Casati		
1977	(Italy) Alessandro Bettoni	(Italy) Mario Fraccaro	(Italy) Claudio Guarnieri
1978	(Italy) Giuseppe Solfrini		
1979	(Italy) Pierangelo Bincoletto		
1980	(Italy) Claudio Girlanda		
1981	(Italy) Manrico Ronchiato		
1982	(Italy) Patrizio Gambirasio		
1983	(Italy) Gabriele Faedi		
1984	(Italy) Angelo Tosi		
1985	(Italy) Gianbattista Bardelloni		
1986	(Italy) Fortunato Salvador		
1987	(Italy) Alberto Destro		
1988	(Italy) Fabrizio Bontempi		
1989	(Italy) Maurizio Tomi		
1990	(Italy) Giovanni Lombardi		
1991	(Italy) Giovanni Lombardi		
1992	(Italy) Gianpiero Polto		
1993	(Italy) Giuseppe Asero		
1994	(Italy) Michele Brombini		
1995	(Italy) Elio Aggiano		
1996	(Italy) Marco Cannone		
1997	(Italy) Paolo Bossoni	(Italy) Fabio Malberti	(Ukraine) Oleksandr Klymenko
1998	(Mexico) Miguel Ángel Meza		
1999	(United Kingdom) Jamie Burrow		
2000	(Italy) Cristiano Parrinello	(Italy) Cristian Tosoni	(Italy) Nicola Gavazzi
2001	(Italy) Simone Cadamuro	(Italy) Sebastiano Scotti	(Italy) Alberto Loddo
2002	(Italy) Luigi Tampanaro	(Italy) Giampaolo Checchi	(Italy) Pasquale Muto
2003	(Italy) Claudio Corioni	(Russia) Aleksandr Bajenov	(Italy) Mauro Conti
2004	(Italy) Rino Zampilli	(Italy) Claudio Corioni	(Italy) Giuseppe Di Salvo
2005	(Italy) Andrea Pagoto	(Italy) Alan Marangoni	(Italy) Mauro Finetto
2006	(Italy) Francesco Ginanni	(Italy) Dario Cataldo	(Uzbekistan) Konstantin Volik
2007	(United Kingdom) Ian Stannard	(Italy) Mirko Selvaggi	(United Kingdom) Ben Swift
2008	(Italy) Salvatore Mancuso	(Ukraine) Vitaliy Buts	(Italy) Cesare Benedetti
2009	(Italy) Stefano Borchi	(Italy) Andrea Palini	(Italy) Ivan Balykin
2010	non disputé		
2011	(Italy) Christian Delle Stelle	(Italy) Sonny Colbrelli	(Italy) Ivan Balykin
2012	(Italy) Nicola Ruffoni	(Italy) Andrea Trovato	(Italy) Andrea Dal Col
2013	(Italy) Federico Zurlo	(Italy) Liam Bertazzo	(Italy) Gianluca Mengardo
2014	(Italy) Nicolas Marini	(Italy) Davide Martinelli	(Italy) Luca Pacioni
2015	(Italy) Simone Consonni	(Albania) Xhuliano Kamberaj	(Italy) Marco Maronese
2016	(Italy) Michael Bresciani	(Italy) Mattia Frapporti	(Italy) Oliviero Troia
2017	(Italy) Pietro Andreoletti	(Italy) Federico Sartor	(Italy) Enrico Logica
2018	(Italy) Matteo Furlan	(Italy) Giacomo Garavaglia	(Italy) Cezary Grodzicki
2019	(Italy) Enrico Zanoncello	(Italy) Gregorio Ferri	(Italy) Tommaso Fiaschi
2020	annulé		
2021	(Italy) Gidas Umbri	(Italy) Francesco Busatto	(Italy) Alex Raimondi
2022	(Italy) Davide Persico	(Italy) Michael Zecchin	(Colombia) Nicolás Gómez
2023	(Italy) Davide Persico	(Italy) Gianluca Cordioli	(Germany) Tim Torn Teutenberg
2024	(South Africa) Travis Stedman	(Italy) Lorenzo Peschi	(Italy) Christian Bagatin
