= Pagoto =

Pagoto is a surname. Notable people with the surname include:

- Andrea Pagoto (born 1985), Italian cyclist
- Sherry Pagoto, American behavioral scientist and clinical psychologist
