= 2019 CRO Race =

2019 UCI Europe Tour
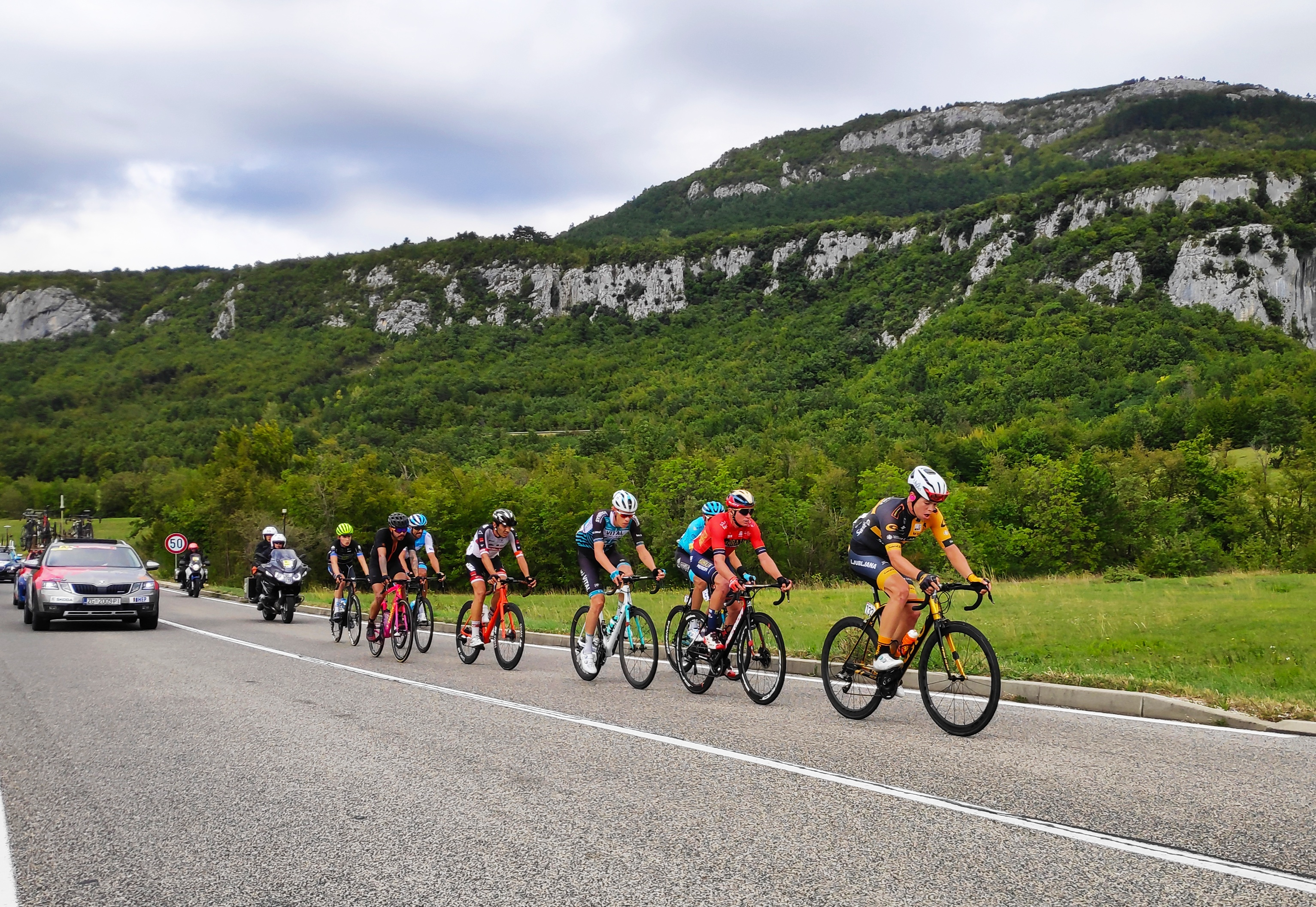
- Breakaway on Stage 5

Race details
- Dates: 1–6 October 2019
- Stages: 6
- Distance: 920.5 km (572.0 mi)

Results
Jersey awarded to the overall winner	Winner	Adam Yates (GBR)	(Mitchelton–Scott)
	Second	Davide Villella (ITA)	(Astana)
	Third	Víctor de la Parte (ESP)	(CCC Team)
Jersey awarded to the points classification winner	Points	Alexander Edmondson (AUS)	(Mitchelton–Scott)
Jersey awarded to the mountains classification winner	Mountains	Adam Yates (GBR)	(Mitchelton–Scott)
Jersey awarded to the young rider classification winner	Young rider	Vadim Pronskiy (KAZ)	(Astana)
	Team	(Kazakhstan) Astana	

The 2019 CRO Race is a road cycling stage race that took place in Croatia between 1 and 6 October 2019. It is the fifth edition of the race through Croatia organized by Top Sport Event company, but first under new name and logo. The race is rated as a 2.1 event as part of the 2019 UCI Europe Tour.

== Teams ==
Eighteen teams were invited to start the race. These included four UCI WorldTeams, five UCI Professional Continental teams and nine UCI Continental teams.

UCI WorldTeams

- Astana
- Bahrain–Merida
- CCC Team
- Mitchelton–Scott

UCI Professional Continental Teams

- Androni Giocattoli–Sidermec
- Bardiani–CSF
- Delko–Marseille Provence
- Israel Cycling Academy
- Vital Concept–B&B Hotels

UCI Continental Teams

- Adria Mobil
- Hrinkow Advarics Cycleang
- Ljubljana Gusto Santic
- Metec–TKH
- P&S Metalltechnik
- Team Felbermayr–Simplon Wels
- Team Illuminate
- Tirol KTM Cycling Team
- Wibatech Merx 7R

== Schedule ==
Stage	Date	Route	Distance	Type	Winner
1	1 October	Osijek to Lipik	210 km (130.5 mi)	Hilly stage	Marko Kump (SLO)
2	2 October	Slunj to Zadar	186 km (115.6 mi)	Hilly stage	Eduard-Michael Grosu (ROM)
3	3 October	Okrug to Makarska	63.5 km (39.5 mi)	Mountain stage	Yevgeniy Gidich (KAZ)
4	4 October	Starigrad to Crikvenica	159 km (98.8 mi)	Hilly stage	Dušan Rajović (SRB)
5	5 October	Rabac to Platak	142 km (88.2 mi)	Mountain stage	Adam Yates (GBR)
6	6 October	Sveta Nedelja to Zagreb	160 km (99.4 mi)	Flat stage	Alessandro Fedeli (ITA)

== Stages ==
=== Stage 1 ===
1 October 2019 — Osijek to Lipik, 210 km (130.5 mi)

Result of Stage 1
Rank	Rider	Team	Time
1	Marko Kump (SLO)	Adria Mobil	4h 27' 29"
2	Yevgeniy Gidich (KAZ)	Astana	+ 0"
3	Eduard-Michael Grosu (ROU)	Delko–Marseille Provence	+ 0"
4	John Mandrysch (GER)	P&S Metalltechnik	+ 0"
5	Alexander Edmondson (AUS)	Mitchelton–Scott	+ 0"
6	Arvid De Kleijn (NED)	Metec–TKH	+ 0"
7	Cyril Gautier (FRA)	Vital Concept–B&B Hotels	+ 0"
8	Rok Korošec (SLO)	Ljubljana Gusto Santic	+ 0"
9	Josip Rumac (CRO)	Androni Giocattoli–Sidermec	+ 0"
10	Matej Mohorič (SLO)	Bahrain–Merida	+ 0"

General classification after Stage 1
Rank	Rider	Team	Time
1	Marko Kump (SLO)	Adria Mobil	4h 27' 19"
2	Yevgeniy Gidich (KAZ)	Astana	+ 4"
3	Dušan Rajović (SRB)	Adria Mobil	+ 4"
4	Eduard-Michael Grosu (ROU)	Delko–Marseille Provence	+ 6"
5	Matej Mohorič (SLO)	Bahrain–Merida	+ 8"
6	Alexis Guerin (FRA)	Delko–Marseille Provence	+ 8"
7	Adam Yates (GBR)	Mitchelton–Scott	+ 9"
8	Matic Grošelj (SLO)	Ljubljana Gusto Santic	+ 9"
9	Josip Rumac (CRO)	Androni Giocattoli–Sidermec	+ 10"
10	John Mandrysch (GER)	P&S Metalltechnik	+ 10"

=== Stage 2 ===
2 October 2019 — Slunj to Zadar, 186 km (115.6 mi)

Result of Stage 2
Rank	Rider	Team	Time
1	Eduard-Michael Grosu (ROU)	Delko–Marseille Provence	4h 24 '39"
2	Alexander Edmondson (AUS)	Mitchelton–Scott	+ 3"
3	Marko Kump (SLO)	Adria Mobil	+ 3"
4	Mattia Frapporti (ITA)	Androni Giocattoli–Sidermec	+ 3"
5	Arvid De Kleijn (NED)	Metec–TKH	+ 3"
6	Cyril Gautier (FRA)	Vital Concept–B&B Hotels	+ 3"
7	Matej Mohorič (SLO)	Bahrain–Merida	+ 3"
8	John Mandrysch (GER)	P&S Metalltechnik	+ 3"
9	Paolo Simion (ITA)	Bardiani–CSF	+ 3"
10	Timon Loderer (GER)	Hrinkow Advarics Cycleang	+ 3"

General classification after Stage 2
Rank	Rider	Team	Time
1	Eduard-Michael Grosu (ROU)	Delko–Marseille Provence	8h 51' 52"
2	Marko Kump (SLO)	Adria Mobil	+ 5"
3	Alexander Edmondson (AUS)	Mitchelton–Scott	+ 13"
4	Yevgeniy Gidich (KAZ)	Astana	+ 13"
5	Matej Mohorič (SLO)	Bahrain–Merida	+ 14"
6	Alexis Guerin (FRA)	Delko–Marseille Provence	+ 17"
7	Adam Yates (GBR)	Mitchelton–Scott	+ 18"
8	Arvid De Kleijn (NED)	Metec–TKH	+ 19"
9	John Mandrysch (GER)	P&S Metalltechnik	+ 19"
10	Mattia Frapporti (ITA)	Androni Giocattoli–Sidermec	+ 19"

=== Stage 3 ===
3 October 2019 — Okrug to Makarska, 63.5 km (39.5 mi)

Result of Stage 3
Rank	Rider	Team	Time
1	Yevgeniy Gidich (KAZ)	Astana	1h 32' 21"
2	Grega Bole (SLO)	Bahrain–Merida	+ 0"
3	Alexander Edmondson (AUS)	Mitchelton–Scott	+ 0"
4	Cyril Gautier (FRA)	Vital Concept–B&B Hotels	+ 0"
5	Maciej Paterski (POL)	Wibatech Merx 7R	+ 0"
6	Sjoerd Bax (NED)	Metec–TKH	+ 0"
7	Mattia Frapporti (ITA)	Androni Giocattoli–Sidermec	+ 0"
8	Brent Bookwalter (USA)	Mitchelton–Scott	+ 0"
9	Andi Bajc (SLO)	Team Felbermayr–Simplon Wels	+ 0"
10	Joey Rosskopf (USA)	CCC Team	+ 0"

General classification after Stage 3
Rank	Rider	Team	Time
1	Yevgeniy Gidich (KAZ)	Astana	10h 24' 16"
2	Alexander Edmondson (AUS)	Mitchelton–Scott	+ 6"
3	Grega Bole (SLO)	Bahrain–Merida	+ 10"
4	Alexis Guerin (FRA)	Delko–Marseille Provence	+ 14"
5	Adam Yates (GBR)	Mitchelton–Scott	+ 15"
6	Mattia Frapporti (ITA)	Androni Giocattoli–Sidermec	+ 16"
7	Andi Bajc (SLO)	Team Felbermayr–Simplon Wels	+ 16"
8	Joey Rosskopf (USA)	CCC Team	+ 16"
9	Maciej Paterski (POL)	Wibatech Merx 7R	+ 16"
10	Andrey Zeits (KAZ)	Astana	+ 16"

=== Stage 4 ===
4 October 2019 — Starigrad to Crikvenica, 159 km (98.8 mi)

Result of Stage 4
Rank	Rider	Team	Time
1	Dušan Rajović (SRB)	Adria Mobil	3h 30' 24"
2	Paolo Simion (ITA)	Bardiani–CSF	+ 0"
3	Heinrich Haussler (AUS)	Bahrain–Merida	+ 0"
4	Maciej Paterski (POL)	Wibatech Merx 7R	+ 0"
5	Alexander Edmondson (AUS)	Mitchelton–Scott	+ 4"
6	Josip Rumac (CRO)	Androni Giocattoli–Sidermec	+ 4"
7	Callum Scotson (AUS)	Mitchelton–Scott	+ 4"
8	Quentin Pacher (FRA)	Vital Concept–B&B Hotels	+ 4"
9	Yevgeniy Gidich (KAZ)	Astana	+ 4"
10	Andi Bajc (SLO)	Team Felbermayr–Simplon Wels	+ 4"

General classification after Stage 4
Rank	Rider	Team	Time
1	Yevgeniy Gidich (KAZ)	Astana	13h 54' 44"
2	Alexander Edmondson (AUS)	Mitchelton–Scott	+ 6"
3	Maciej Paterski (POL)	Wibatech Merx 7R	+ 12"
4	Alexis Guerin (FRA)	Delko–Marseille Provence	+ 14"
5	Adam Yates (GBR)	Mitchelton–Scott	+ 15"
6	Andi Bajc (SLO)	Team Felbermayr–Simplon Wels	+ 16"
7	Andrey Zeits (KAZ)	Astana	+ 16"
8	Quentin Pacher (FRA)	Vital Concept–B&B Hotels	+ 16"
9	Mattia Frapporti (ITA)	Androni Giocattoli–Sidermec	+ 16"
10	Davide Villella (ITA)	Astana	+ 16"

=== Stage 5 ===
5 October 2019 — Rabac to Platak, 142 km (88.2 mi)

Result of Stage 5
Rank	Rider	Team	Time
1	Adam Yates (GBR)	Mitchelton–Scott	3h 40' 01"
2	Davide Villella (ITA)	Astana	+ 10"
3	Víctor de la Parte (ESP)	CCC Team	+ 10"
4	Pierre Rolland (FRA)	Vital Concept–B&B Hotels	+ 10"
5	Domen Novak (SLO)	Bahrain–Merida	+ 11"
6	Nathan Earle (AUS)	Israel Cycling Academy	+ 17"
7	Andrey Zeits (KAZ)	Astana	+ 22"
8	Alexis Guerin (FRA)	Delko–Marseille Provence	+ 49"
9	Luca Covili (ITA)	Bardiani–CSF	+ 53"
10	Matteo Badilatti (SUI)	Israel Cycling Academy	+ 1' 10"

General classification after Stage 5
Rank	Rider	Team	Time
1	Adam Yates (GBR)	Mitchelton–Scott	17h 34' 46"
2	Davide Villella (ITA)	Astana	+ 15"
3	Víctor de la Parte (ESP)	CCC Team	+ 17"
4	Andrey Zeits (KAZ)	Astana	+ 33"
5	Domen Novak (SLO)	Bahrain–Merida	+ 41"
6	Alexis Guerin (FRA)	Delko–Marseille Provence	+ 57"
7	Pierre Rolland (FRA)	Vital Concept–B&B Hotels	+ 1' 16"
8	Brent Bookwalter (USA)	Mitchelton–Scott	+ 1' 42"
9	Sjoerd Bax (NED)	Metec–TKH	+ 1' 45"
10	Radoslav Rogina (CRO)	Adria Mobil	+ 1' 50"

=== Stage 6 ===
6 October 2019 — Sveta Nedelja to Zagreb, 160 km (99.4 mi)

Result of Stage 6
Rank	Rider	Team	Time
1	Alessandro Fedeli (ITA)	Delko–Marseille Provence	3h 22' 14"
2	Jan Tratnik (SLO)	Bahrain–Merida	+ 2"
3	Florian Kierner (AUT)	Team Felbermayr–Simplon Wels	+ 2"
4	Stef Krul (NED)	Metec–TKH	+ 2"
5	Alexander Edmondson (AUS)	Mitchelton–Scott	+ 5"
6	Dušan Rajović (SRB)	Adria Mobil	+ 5"
7	Adam Yates (GBR)	Mitchelton–Scott	+ 5"
8	Sjoerd Bax (NED)	Metec–TKH	+ 5"
9	Benjamin Hill (AUS)	Ljubljana Gusto Santic	+ 5"
10	Quentin Pacher (FRA)	Vital Concept–B&B Hotels	+ 5"

Final general classification
Rank	Rider	Team	Time
1	Adam Yates (GBR)	Mitchelton–Scott	20h 57' 05"
2	Davide Villella (ITA)	Astana	+ 22"
3	Víctor de la Parte (ESP)	CCC Team	+ 29"
4	Andrey Zeits (KAZ)	Astana	+ 42"
5	Domen Novak (SLO)	Bahrain–Merida	+ 50"
6	Alexis Guerin (FRA)	Delko–Marseille Provence	+ 1' 09"
7	Pierre Rolland (FRA)	Vital Concept–B&B Hotels	+ 1' 25"
8	Brent Bookwalter (USA)	Mitchelton–Scott	+ 1' 42"
9	Sjoerd Bax (NED)	Metec–TKH	+ 1' 45"
10	Radoslav Rogina (CRO)	Adria Mobil	+ 2' 09"

== Classification leadership table ==
Classification leadership by stage
Stage	Winner	General classification	Points classification	Mountains classification	Young rider classification	Team classification
1	Marko Kump	Marko Kump	Marko Kump	Markus Wildauer	Dušan Rajović	Astana
2	Eduard-Michael Grosu	Eduard-Michael Grosu	Eduard-Michael Grosu	Markus Wildauer	Vadim Pronskiy	Astana
3	Yevgeniy Gidich	Yevgeniy Gidich	Alexander Edmondson	Markus Wildauer	Georg Zimmermann	Astana
4	Dušan Rajović	Yevgeniy Gidich	Alexander Edmondson	Markus Wildauer	Georg Zimmermann	Mitchelton–Scott
5	Adam Yates	Adam Yates	Alexander Edmondson	Adam Yates	Vadim Pronskiy	Astana
6	Alessandro Fedeli	Adam Yates	Alexander Edmondson	Adam Yates	Vadim Pronskiy	Astana
Final		Adam Yates	Alexander Edmondson	Adam Yates	Vadim Pronskiy	Astana

== Classification standings ==
Legend
Denotes the winner of the general classification
Denotes the winner of the points classification
Denotes the winner of the mountains classification
Denotes the winner of the young rider classification
Denotes the winner of the team classification

=== General classification ===
Final general classification (1–10)
Rank	Rider	Team	Time
1	Adam Yates (GBR)	Mitchelton–Scott	20h 57' 05"
2	Davide Villella (ITA)	Astana	+ 22"
3	Víctor de la Parte (ESP)	CCC Team	+ 29"
4	Andrey Zeits (KAZ)	Astana	+ 42"
5	Domen Novak (SLO)	Bahrain–Merida	+ 50"
6	Alexis Guerin (FRA)	Delko–Marseille Provence	+ 1' 09"
7	Pierre Rolland (FRA)	Vital Concept–B&B Hotels	+ 1' 25"
8	Brent Bookwalter (USA)	Mitchelton–Scott	+ 1' 42"
9	Sjoerd Bax (NED)	Metec–TKH	+ 1' 45"
10	Radoslav Rogina (CRO)	Adria Mobil	+ 2' 09"

=== Points classification ===
Final points classification (1–10)
Rank	Rider	Team	Points
1	Alexander Edmondson (AUS)	Mitchelton–Scott	72
2	Yevgeniy Gidich (KAZ)	Astana	52
3	Dušan Rajović (SRB)	Adria Mobil	45
4	Marko Kump (SLO)	Adria Mobil	41
5	Adam Yates (GBR)	Mitchelton–Scott	36
6	Paolo Simion (ITA)	Bardiani–CSF	32
7	John Mandrysch (GER)	P&S Metalltechnik	30
8	Maciej Paterski (POL)	Wibatech Merx 7R	30
9	Davide Villella (ITA)	Astana	29
10	Alessandro Fedeli (ITA)	Delko–Marseille Provence	28

=== Mountains classification ===
Final mountains classification (1–10)
Rank	Rider	Team	Points
1	Adam Yates (GBR)	Mitchelton–Scott	22
2	Riccardo Zoidl (AUT)	CCC Team	20
3	Domen Novak (SLO)	Bahrain–Merida	17
4	Víctor de la Parte (ESP)	CCC Team	16
5	Davide Villella (ITA)	Astana	15
6	Benjamin Hill (AUS)	Ljubljana Gusto Santic	13
7	Markus Wildauer (AUT)	Tirol KTM Cycling Team	11
8	Nathan Earle (AUS)	Israel Cycling Academy	8
9	Félix Barón (COL)	Team Illuminate	6
10	Alexis Guerin (FRA)	Delko–Marseille Provence	4

=== Young rider classification ===
Final young rider classification (1–10)
Rank	Rider	Team	Time
1	Vadim Pronskiy (KAZ)	Astana	21h 00' 38"
2	Luca Covili (ITA)	Bardiani–CSF	+ 1' 38"
3	Maxime Chevalier (FRA)	Vital Concept–B&B Hotels	+ 4' 04"
4	Dominik Rober (GER)	P&S Metalltechnik	+ 11' 45"
5	Felix Engelhardt (GER)	Tirol KTM Cycling Team	+ 12' 09"
6	Georg Zimmermann (GER)	CCC Team	+ 14' 28"
7	Dylan Bouwmans (NED)	Metec–TKH	+ 16' 58"
8	Lars van den Berg (NED)	Metec–TKH	+ 20' 55"
9	Danny van der Tuuk (NED)	Metec–TKH	+ 22' 31"
10	Aljaž Prah (SLO)	Ljubljana Gusto Santic	+ 23' 35"

=== Team classification ===
Final team classification (1–10)
Rank	Team	Time
1	Astana	62h 55' 38"
2	CCC Team	+ 1' 10"
3	Vital Concept–B&B Hotels	+ 3' 02"
4	Delko–Marseille Provence	+ 5' 20"
5	Mitchelton–Scott	+ 6' 42"
6	Team Illuminate	+ 23' 56"
7	Adria Mobil	+ 26' 36"
8	Bahrain–Merida	+ 26' 40"
9	Metec–TKH	+ 31' 52"
10	Wibatech Merx 7R	+ 39' 08"
