= 2016 Four Days of Dunkirk =

2016 UCI Europe Tour

Race details
- Dates: 4–8 May
- Stages: 5
- Distance: 860 km (530 mi)

Results
Jersey awarded to the overall winner	Winner	Bryan Coquard (FRA)	(Direct Énergie)
	Second	Marco Frapporti (ITA)	(Androni Giocattoli–Sidermec)
	Third	Xandro Meurisse (BEL)	(Crelan–Vastgoedservice)
Jersey awarded to the points classification winner	Points	Bryan Coquard (FRA)	(Direct Énergie)
Jersey awarded to the mountains classification winner	Mountains	Stéphane Poulhies (FRA)	(Armée de Terre)
Jersey awarded to the young rider classification winner	Young rider	Bryan Coquard (FRA)	(Direct Énergie)
	Team	Etixx–Quick-Step	

The 2016 Four Days of Dunkirk (French: Quatre Jours de Dunkerque 2016) was the 62nd edition of the Four Days of Dunkirk cycling stage race. It started on 4 May in Dunkirk and ended on 8 May again in Dunkirk.

== Teams ==
The start list includes 18 teams (3 UCI WorldTeams, 10 Professional Continental Teams, and 5 Continental Teams).

World Teams

- Etixx–Quick-Step
- FDJ
- AG2R La Mondiale

Professional Continental teams

- Androni Giocattoli–Sidermec
- Cofidis
- Delko–Marseille Provence KTM
- Direct Énergie
- Fortuneo–Vital Concept
- ONE Pro Cycling
- Roompot–Oranje Peloton
- Stölting Service Group
- Topsport Vlaanderen–Baloise
- Wanty–Groupe Gobert

Continental teams

- Crelan–Vastgoedservice
- Armée de Terre
- HP BTP–Auber93
- Roubaix–Métropole Européenne de Lille
- Wallonie-Bruxelles–Group Protect

== Route ==
Stage characteristics and winners
Stage	Date	Course	Distance	Type	Stage winner
1	4 May	Dunkirk to Gravelines	191.4 km (118.9 mi)	Flat stage	Bryan Coquard (FRA)
2	5 May	Aniche to Aniche	188.3 km (117.0 mi)	Flat stage	Bryan Coquard (FRA)
3	6 May	Béthune to Saint-Pol-sur-Ternoise	174 km (108 mi)	Hilly stage	Bryan Coquard (FRA)
4	7 May	Audruicq to Cassel	178.2 km (110.7 mi)	Hilly stage	Xandro Meurisse (BEL)
5	8 May	Hondschoote to Dunkirk	160.7 km (99.9 mi)	Flat stage	Kenny Dehaes (BEL)

== Stages ==
=== Stage 1 ===
4 May 2016 — Dunkirk to Gravelines, 169.9 km (105.6 mi)

Result of stage 1
Rank	Rider	Team	Time
1	Bryan Coquard (FRA)	Direct Énergie	4hr 28' 53"
2	Raymond Kreder (NED)	Roompot–Oranje Peloton	+0"
3	Nacer Bouhanni (FRA)	Cofidis	+0"
4	Bert Van Lerberghe (BEL)	Topsport Vlaanderen–Baloise	+0"
5	Kenny Dehaes (BEL)	Wanty–Groupe Gobert	+0"
6	Rudy Barbier (FRA)	Roubaix–Métropole Européenne de Lille	+0"
7	Daniel Hoelgaard (NOR)	FDJ	+0"
8	Maximiliano Richeze (ARG)	Etixx–Quick-Step	+0"
9	Yannick Martinez (FRA)	Delko–Marseille Provence KTM	+0"
10	Francesco Chicchi (ITA)	Androni Giocattoli–Sidermec	+0"
Source: ProCyclingStats

General classification after stage 1
Rank	Rider	Team	Time
1	Bryan Coquard (FRA)	Direct Énergie	4hr 28' 43"
2	Marco Frapporti (ITA)	Androni Giocattoli–Sidermec	+2"
3	Raymond Kreder (NED)	Roompot–Oranje Peloton	+4"
4	Kai Reus (NED)	Roompot–Oranje Peloton	+4"
5	Nacer Bouhanni (FRA)	Cofidis	+6"
6	Stéphane Poulhies (FRA)	Armée de Terre	+6"
7	Bert Van Lerberghe (BEL)	Topsport Vlaanderen–Baloise	+10"
8	Kenny Dehaes (BEL)	Wanty–Groupe Gobert	+10"
9	Rudy Barbier (FRA)	Roubaix–Métropole Européenne de Lille	+10"
10	Daniel Hoelgaard (NOR)	FDJ	+10"
Source: ProCyclingStats

=== Stage 2 ===
5 May 2016 — Aniche to Aniche, 185.5 km (115.3 mi)

Result of stage 2
Rank	Rider	Team	Time
1	Bryan Coquard (FRA)	Direct Énergie	4hr 34' 18"
2	Nacer Bouhanni (FRA)	Cofidis	+0"
3	Roy Jans (BEL)	Wanty–Groupe Gobert	+0"
4	Rudy Barbier (FRA)	Roubaix–Métropole Européenne de Lille	+0"
5	Maximiliano Richeze (ARG)	Etixx–Quick-Step	+0"
6	Kenny Dehaes (BEL)	Wanty–Groupe Gobert	+0"
7	Raymond Kreder (NED)	Roompot–Oranje Peloton	+0"
8	Boris Vallée (BEL)	Fortuneo–Vital Concept	+0"
9	Leonardo Duque (COL)	Delko–Marseille Provence KTM	+0"
10	Benjamin Giraud (FRA)	Delko–Marseille Provence KTM	+0"
Source: ProCyclingStats

General classification after stage 2
Rank	Rider	Team	Time
1	Bryan Coquard (FRA)	Direct Énergie	9hr 02' 51"
2	Nacer Bouhanni (FRA)	Cofidis	+10"
3	Gediminas Bagdonas (LTU)	AG2R La Mondiale	+12"
4	Marco Frapporti (ITA)	Androni Giocattoli–Sidermec	+12"
5	Raymond Kreder (NED)	Roompot–Oranje Peloton	+14"
6	Kai Reus (NED)	Roompot–Oranje Peloton	+14"
7	Félix Pouilly (FRA)	Roubaix–Métropole Européenne de Lille	+15"
8	Roy Jans (BEL)	Wanty–Groupe Gobert	+15"
9	Stéphane Poulhies (FRA)	Armée de Terre	+16"
10	Sjoerd Van Ginneken (NED)	Roompot–Oranje Peloton	+16"
Source: ProCyclingStats

=== Stage 3 ===
6 May 2016 — Béthune to Saint-Pol-sur-Ternoise, 169.1 km (105.1 mi)

Result of stage 3
Rank	Rider	Team	Time
1	Bryan Coquard (FRA)	Direct Énergie	4hr 10' 17"
2	Baptiste Planckaert (BEL)	Wallonie-Bruxelles–Group Protect	+0"
3	Rudy Barbier (FRA)	Roubaix–Métropole Européenne de Lille	+0"
4	Maximiliano Richeze (ARG)	Etixx–Quick-Step	+0"
5	Olivier Pardini (BEL)	Wallonie-Bruxelles–Group Protect	+0"
6	Nacer Bouhanni (FRA)	Cofidis	+0"
7	Laurent Pichon (FRA)	FDJ	+0"
8	Yannis Yssaad (FRA)	Armée de Terre	+0"
9	Romain Feillu (FRA)	HP BTP–Auber93	+0"
10	Sébastien Minard (FRA)	AG2R La Mondiale	+0"
Source: ProCyclingStats

General classification after stage 3
Rank	Rider	Team	Time
1	Bryan Coquard (FRA)	Direct Énergie	13hr 12' 58"
2	Nacer Bouhanni (FRA)	Cofidis	+20"
3	Gediminas Bagdonas (LTU)	AG2R La Mondiale	+22"
4	Marco Frapporti (ITA)	Androni Giocattoli–Sidermec	+22"
5	Raymond Kreder (NED)	Roompot–Oranje Peloton	+24"
6	Baptiste Planckaert (BEL)	Wallonie-Bruxelles–Group Protect	+24"
7	Félix Pouilly (FRA)	Roubaix–Métropole Européenne de Lille	+25"
8	Rudy Barbier (FRA)	Roubaix–Métropole Européenne de Lille	+26"
9	Brian Van Goethem (NED)	Roompot–Oranje Peloton	+26"
10	Sjoerd Van Ginneken (NED)	Roompot–Oranje Peloton	+26"
Source: ProCyclingStats

=== Stage 4 ===
7 May 2016 — Audruicq to Cassel, Nord, 175.8 km (109.2 mi)

Result of stage 4
Rank	Rider	Team	Time
1	Xandro Meurisse (BEL)	Crelan–Vastgoedservice	4hr 40' 09"
2	Bryan Coquard (FRA)	Direct Énergie	+0"
3	Marco Frapporti (ITA)	Androni Giocattoli–Sidermec	+0"
4	Pierrick Fédrigo (FRA)	Fortuneo–Vital Concept	+0"
5	Dion Smith (NZL)	ONE Pro Cycling	+0"
6	Damien Gaudin (FRA)	AG2R La Mondiale	+3"
7	Delio Fernández (ESP)	Delko–Marseille Provence KTM	+3"
8	Yoann Offredo (FRA)	FDJ	+11"
9	Rasmus Quaade (DEN)	Stölting Service Group	+11"
10	Mirko Selvaggi (ITA)	Androni Giocattoli–Sidermec	+16"
Source: ProCyclingStats

General classification after stage 4
Rank	Rider	Team	Time
1	Bryan Coquard (FRA)	Direct Énergie	17hr 53' 01"
2	Marco Frapporti (ITA)	Androni Giocattoli–Sidermec	+24"
3	Xandro Meurisse (BEL)	Crelan–Vastgoedservice	+25"
4	Dion Smith (NZL)	ONE Pro Cycling	+36"
5	Pierrick Fédrigo (FRA)	Fortuneo–Vital Concept	+36"
6	Delio Fernández (ESP)	Delko–Marseille Provence KTM	+39"
7	Damien Gaudin (FRA)	AG2R La Mondiale	+39"
8	Yoann Offredo (FRA)	FDJ	+43"
9	Rasmus Quaade (DEN)	Stölting Service Group	+47"
10	Mirko Selvaggi (ITA)	Androni Giocattoli–Sidermec	+52"
Source: ProCyclingStats

=== Stage 5 ===
8 May 2016 — Hondschoote to Dunkerque, 159.7 km (99.2 mi)

Result of stage 5
Rank	Rider	Team	Time
1	Kenny Dehaes (BEL)	Wanty–Groupe Gobert	3hr 31' 08"
2	Bryan Coquard (FRA)	Direct Énergie	+0"
3	Maximiliano Richeze (ARG)	Etixx–Quick-Step	+0"
4	Nacer Bouhanni (FRA)	Cofidis	+0"
5	Raymond Kreder (NED)	Roompot–Oranje Peloton	+0"
6	Marco Benfatto (ITA)	Androni Giocattoli–Sidermec	+0"
7	Baptiste Planckaert (BEL)	Wallonie-Bruxelles–Group Protect	+0"
8	Gediminas Bagdonas (LTU)	AG2R La Mondiale	+0"
9	Romain Feillu (FRA)	HP BTP–Auber93	+0"
10	Bert Van Lerberghe (BEL)	Topsport Vlaanderen–Baloise	+0"
Source: ProCyclingStats

Final general classification
Rank	Rider	Team	Time
1	Bryan Coquard (FRA)	Direct Énergie	21hr 24' 03"
2	Marco Frapporti (ITA)	Androni Giocattoli–Sidermec	+30"
3	Xandro Meurisse (BEL)	Crelan–Vastgoedservice	+31"
4	Pierrick Fédrigo (FRA)	Fortuneo–Vital Concept	+41"
5	Dion Smith (NZL)	ONE Pro Cycling	+42"
6	Delio Fernández (ESP)	Delko–Marseille Provence KTM	+45"
7	Damien Gaudin (FRA)	AG2R La Mondiale	+45"
8	Yoann Offredo (FRA)	FDJ	+46"
9	Rasmus Quaade (DEN)	Stölting Service Group	+53"
10	Mirko Selvaggi (ITA)	Androni Giocattoli–Sidermec	+58"
Source: ProCyclingStats

== Classification leadership table ==
Stage	Winner	General classification	Mountains classification	Points classification	Young rider classification	Teams classification
1	Bryan Coquard	Bryan Coquard	Stéphane Poulhies	Bryan Coquard	Bryan Coquard	Delko–Marseille Provence KTM
2	Bryan Coquard	Bryan Coquard	Stéphane Poulhies	Bryan Coquard	Bryan Coquard	Delko–Marseille Provence KTM
3	Bryan Coquard	Bryan Coquard	Stéphane Poulhies	Bryan Coquard	Bryan Coquard	Delko–Marseille Provence KTM
4	Xandro Meurisse	Bryan Coquard	Stéphane Poulhies	Bryan Coquard	Bryan Coquard	Etixx–Quick-Step
5	Kenny Dehaes	Bryan Coquard	Stéphane Poulhies	Bryan Coquard	Bryan Coquard	Etixx–Quick-Step
Final		Bryan Coquard	Stéphane Poulhies	Bryan Coquard	Bryan Coquard	Etixx–Quick-Step
