= Frapporti =

Frapporti is a surname of Italian origin. Notable people with that name include:

- Marco Frapporti (born 1985), Italian cyclist
- Mattia Frapporti (born 1994), Italian cyclist
- Simona Frapporti (born 1988), Italian cyclist
