= Coppa Città di Asti =

Bicycle race held in the Asti

Coordinates: 44°54′00″N 8°12′25″E

Race details
- Region: Asti, Italy
- English name: Asti Cup
- Local name: Coppa Città di Asti (in Italian)
- Discipline: Road
- Type: One-day race

History
- First edition: 1927
- Editions: 73 (as of 2007)
- First winner: Giovanni Balla (ITA)
- Most recent: Tony Martin (GER)

The Coppa Città di Asti was an annual one-day cycling race held in the Asti commune of Province of Asti, Italy.

The last edition of the race was held in 2007. The cessation of the race was not attributed to financial constraints, as historical sponsors continued their support. Luciano Cerrato, the organizer of the race cited the absence of his brother-in-law Piero Pia, who had an important role in the administrative aspects of the event.

== Results ==
Year	Winner	Second	Third
1927	(Italy) Giovanni Balla		
1928	(Italy) Piero Bertolazzo		
1929	(Italy) Giuseppe Graglia		
1930	(Italy) Piero Bertolazzo		
1931	(Italy) Giuseppe Graglia		
1932	(Italy) Giuseppe Graglia		
1933	(Italy) Glauco Servadei		
1934	(Italy) Domenico Oggero		
1935	(Italy) Giuseppe Pelassa		
1936	(Italy) Pierino Agnesina		
1937	(Italy) Amilcare Amisano		
1938	(Italy) Sebastiano Torchio		
1939	(Italy) Antonio Centis		
1940	(Italy) Giovanni De Stefanis		
1943	(Italy) Lores Zanotti		
1946	(Italy) Enrico Mollo		
1947	(Italy) Oreste Giorno		
1948	(Italy) Giovanni Pettinati		
1949	(Italy) Oreste Giorno		
1950	(Italy) Giovanni Pettinati		
1951	(Italy) Walter Vignono		
1952	(Italy) Giuseppe Favero		
1953	(Italy) Valerio Chiarlone		
1954	(Italy) Colombo Cassano		
1955	(Italy) Ernesto Minetto		
1956	(Italy) Alessandro Cacherano		
1958	(Italy) Giancarlo Martini		
1959	(Italy) Umberto Ginocchio		
1960	(Italy) Bruno Giorza		
1961	(Italy) Renzo Dondoglio		
1962	(Italy) Lorenzo Carminati		
1963	(Italy) Angelo Ottaviani		
1964	(Italy) Marino Rossi		
1965	(Italy) Matteo Cravero		
1966	(Italy) Roberto Bonetto		
1967	(Italy) Giuseppe Scopel		
1968	(Italy) Elminio Ferdusi		
1969	(Italy) Giuseppe Camisani		
1970	(Italy) Tommaso Giroli		
1971	(Italy) Luciano Fusar Poli		
1972	(Italy) Tommaso Giroli		
1973	(Italy) Franco Peruzzo		
1974	(Italy) Donato Masi		
1976	(Italy) Piercarlo Rudino		
1978	(Italy) Gilberto Barbero		
1979	(Italy) Walter Cossetta		
1980	(Italy) Flavio Gioffre		
1981	(Italy) Paolo Di Martino		
1982	(Italy) Luigi Burgo		
1983	(Italy) Corrado Morandi		
1984	(Italy) Carlo Buffa		
1985	(Italy) Franco Beduz		
1986	(Italy) Bruno Marini		
1987	(Italy) Fabio Colnaghi		
1990	(Italy) Giuseppe Tartaggia		
1991	(Italy) Claudio Grosso		
1992	(Italy) Giuseppe Palumbo		
1993	(Italy) Francesco Secchiari		
1994	(Italy) Marco Bellini		
1995	(Italy) Mauro Silvestri		
1996	(Italy) Gianluca Nicole		
1997	(Italy) Massimiliano Martini		
1998	(Italy) Luca Barla	(Italy) Fabio Testi	(Italy) Moris Sammassimo
1999	(Italy) Alessandro Cortinovis	(Russia) Dmitri Dementiev	(Mexico) Miguel Ángel Meza
2000	(Italy) Franco Pellizotti	(Ukraine) Yaroslav Popovych	(Italy) Federico Berta
2001	(Italy) Luca Solari	(Italy) Andrea Sanvido	(Italy) Manuel Quinziato
2002	(Italy) Cristian Tosoni	(Poland) Daniel Okrucinski	(Russia) Vladimir Gusev
2003	(Italy) Daniele Di Nucci	(Poland) Hubert Krys	(Italy) Francesco Failli
2004	(Australia) Aaron Kemps	(Italy) Daniele Colli	(Italy) Rino Zampilli
2005	(Italy) Fabio Sabatini	(Italy) Tiziano Dall'Antonia	(Australia) Nicholas Sanderson
2006	(Italy) Oscar Gatto	(Australia) Matthew Goss	(Italy) Stefano Basso
2007	(Germany) Tony Martin	(Belarus) Siarhei Papok	(Poland) Jarosław Marycz
