= Davide Persico =

Italian cyclist

Personal information
- Born: 1 April 2001 (age 25) Cene, Lombardy, Italy
- Height: 1.75 m (5 ft 9 in)
- Weight: 65 kg (143 lb)

Cycling career
- Sport: Cycling
- Current team: MBH Bank CSB Telecom Fort
- Discipline: Road
- Role: Rider
- Rider type: Sprinter

Amateur team
- 2018–2019: SC Valle Seriana-Cene

Professional teams
- 2020–2023: Team Colpack–Ballan
- 2023: Bingoal WB (stagiaire)
- 2024–2025: Bingoal WB
- 2026–: MBH Bank CSB Telecom Fort

Davide Persico (born 1 April 2001) is an Italian cyclist, who currently rides for UCI ProTeam MBH Bank CSB Telecom Fort. His sister Silvia is also a professional cyclist.

== Major results ==
2019
2nd Trofeo Comune di Vertova
2021
1st Coppa San Geo
10th Circuito del Porto
2022
1st Circuito del Porto
1st Milano-Busseto
3rd Youngster Coast Challenge
3rd Coppa San Geo
2023
1st La Popolarissima
1st Coppa San Geo
1st Milano-Busseto
2nd Circuito del Porto
4th Umag Trophy
6th Overall Tour of Istanbul

1st Stage 3

2024 (1 pro win)
1st Stage 6 Tour of Qinghai Lake
5th Grand Prix d'Isbergues
2026
1st La Popolarissima
8th Umag Classic
