= Stéphane Poulhies =

French road bicycle racer

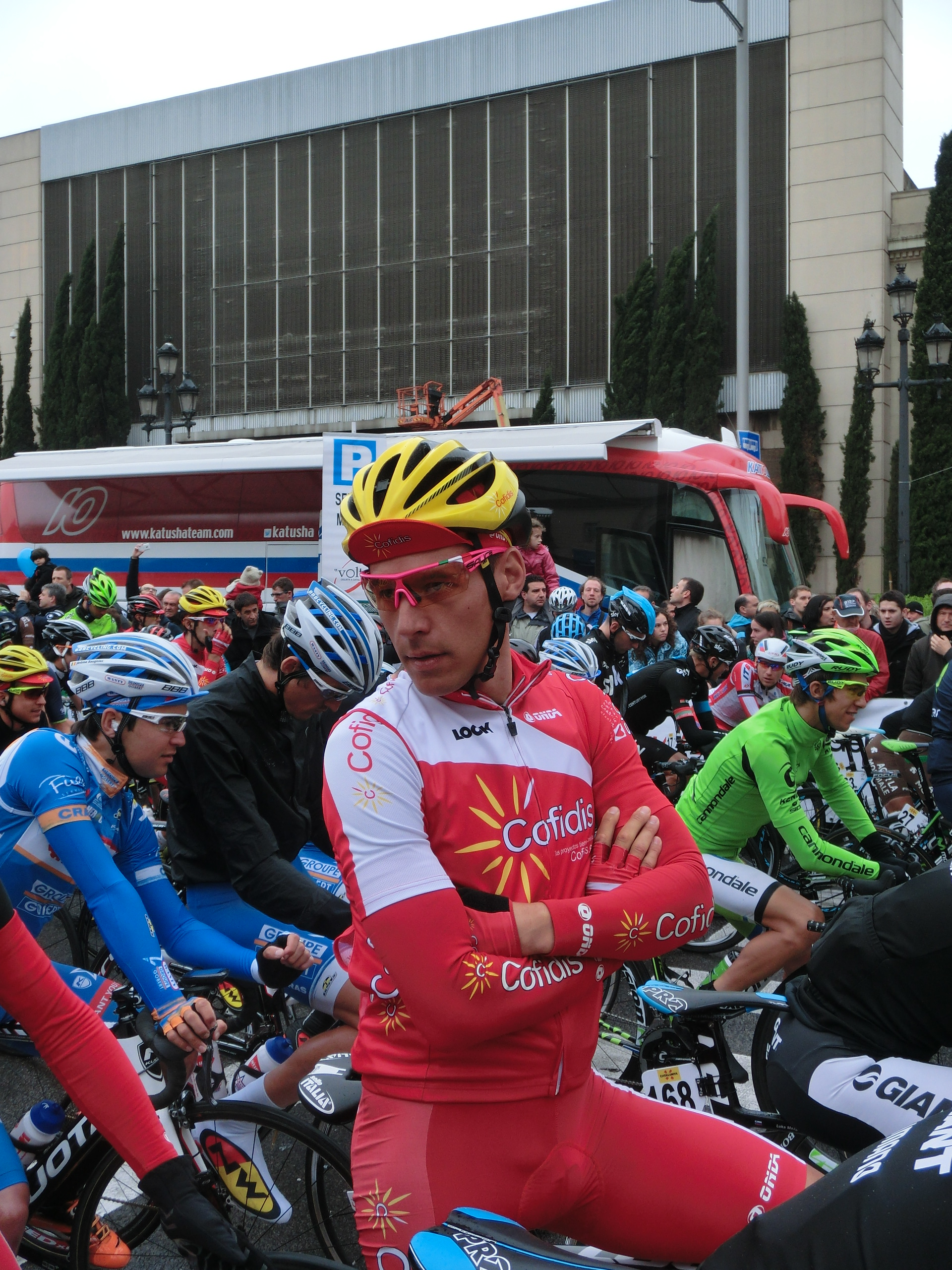

Personal information
- Full name: Stéphane Poulhies
- Born: 26 June 1985 (age 41) Albi, France
- Height: 1.85 m (6 ft 1 in)
- Weight: 75 kg (165 lb)

Cycling career
- Sport: Cycling
- Current team: Retired
- Discipline: Road
- Role: Rider
- Rider type: Sprinter

Amateur teams
- 2005: AG2R Prévoyance (stagiaire)
- 2015: Occitane Cyclisme Formation
- 2018–2019: Occitane Cyclisme Formation

Professional teams
- 2006–2009: AG2R Prévoyance
- 2010–2012: Saur–Sojasun
- 2013–2014: Cofidis
- 2016–2017: Armée de Terre

Stéphane Poulhies (born 26 June 1985) is a French former road bicycle racer, who rode professionally between 2006 and 2017 for the Ag2r–La Mondiale, Saur–Sojasun, Cofidis, and Armée de Terre teams.

== Major results ==
2005
Ronde de l'Isard

1st Points classification
1st Stage 3

1st Stage 1 Le Triptyque des Monts et Châteaux
2nd Road race, Mediterranean Games
2nd Road race, National Under-23 Road Championships
2007
1st Stage 1 Tour de l'Avenir
7th Boucles de l'Aulne
2010
1st Stage 2 Tour de l'Ain
8th Overall Driedaagse van West-Vlaanderen
2011
1st Stage 4 Étoile de Bessèges
2nd Circuito de Getxo
5th Cholet-Pays de Loire
7th Nokere Koerse
2012
1st Stage 5a Étoile de Bessèges
1st Stage 1 Route du Sud
3rd Grand Prix d'Isbergues
4th Overall Tour de Picardie
4th Clásica de Almería
7th Paris–Troyes
2013
5th Clásica de Almería
2014
5th Clásica de Almería
9th Road race, National Road Championships
10th Circuito de Getxo
2015
1st Overall Tour de Gironde

1st Points classification
1st Stage 3

3rd Overall Kreiz Breizh Elites

1st Stage 1

2016
1st Mountains classification Four Days of Dunkirk
2018
3rd Overall Tour de la Pharmacie Centrale

=== Grand Tour general classification results timeline ===
Grand Tour	2008	2009	2010	2011	2012	2013
Giro d'Italia	Did not contest during his career					
Tour de France	Did not contest during his career					
Vuelta a España	128	—	—	—	—	138

Legend
—	Did not compete
DNF	Did not finish
