= Sherry Pagoto =

Psychologist

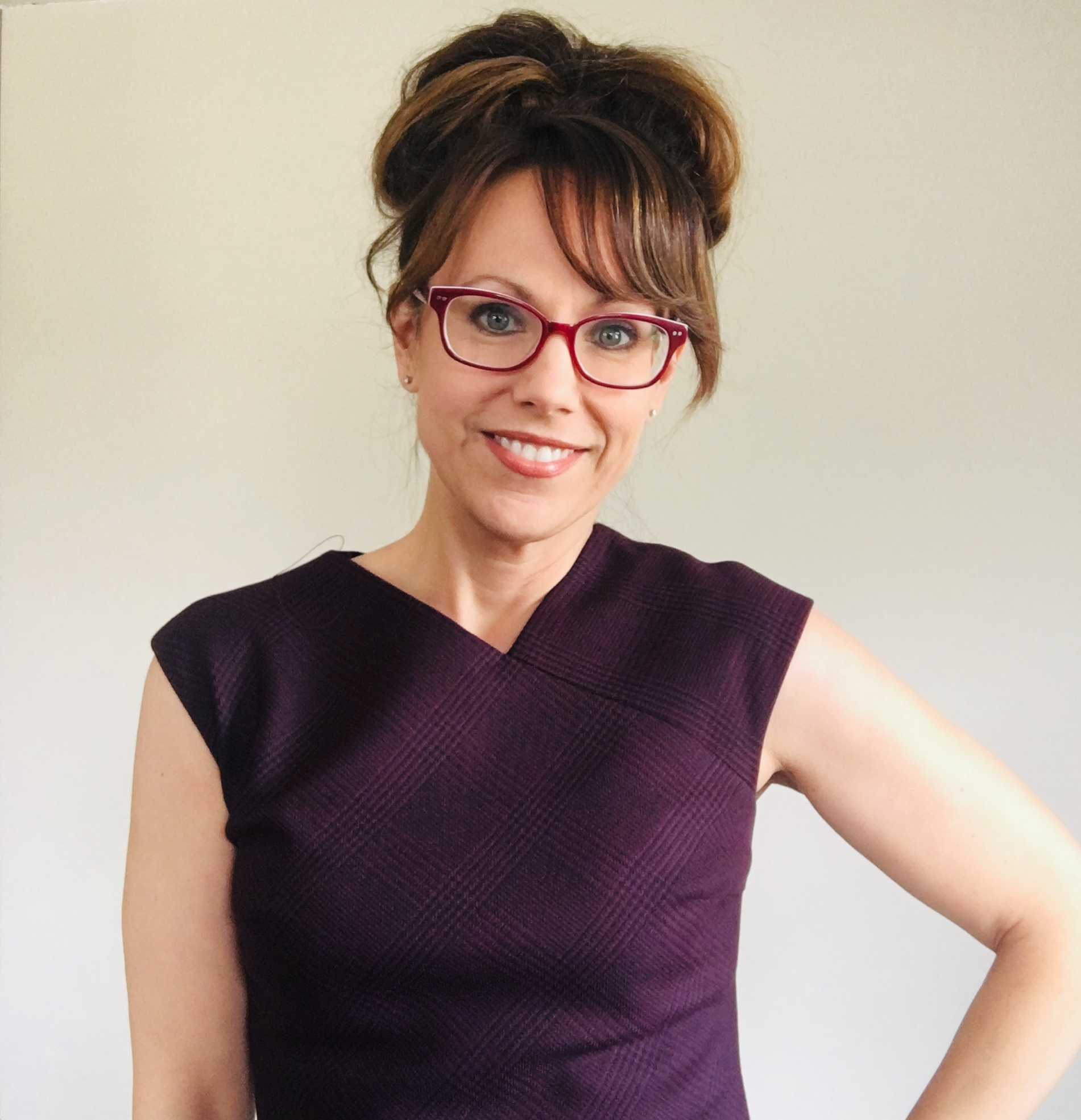
- in 2019
- Education: Western Michigan University; Oakland University
- Known for: Behavioral medicine, Social media research, public health, science communication
- Scientific career
- Workplaces: University of Connecticut; University of Massachusetts; University of Illinois at Chicago; Hines VA Medical Center, Chicago; Jesse Brown VA Medical Center, Chicago

Sherry Pagoto is a professor in the Department of Allied Health Sciences at the University of Connecticut and director of the UConn Center for mHealth and Social Media. A behavioural scientist and licensed clinical psychologist, she is an expert in leveraging technology, especially social media, to promote health behavior change with extensive research on the topics of obesity management and cancer prevention. She is the president of the Society of Behavioral Medicine.

== Education and early career ==
Pagoto studied psychology at Oakland University and graduated cum laude in 1995. She earned an MA (1998) and PhD (2001) at Western Michigan University under the supervision of Wayne Fuqua. She then moved on to complete a postdoctoral fellowship at the University of Illinois at Chicago under the mentorship of Bonnie Spring. She completed a predoctoral internship in health psychology at the Jesse Brown VA Medical Center in Chicago, Illinois. She was a postdoctoral researcher at the University of Illinois at Chicago. Here she earned a K23 Patient Oriented Career Development Award from the National Heart, Lung, and Blood Institute to investigate obesity and emotional eating.

She was appointed research assistant professor at University of Illinois in 2002. She accepted a position of assistant professor of medicine at the University of Massachusetts Medical School in 2004, and received a license to practice clinical psychology in Massachusetts. In 2017, she accepted a position at the University of Connecticut in the Department of Allied Health Sciences and the UConn Institute for Collaborations in Health and Interventions and Policy, where she is the director of the University of Connecticut Center for mHealth and Social Media. In 2017 she was elected as President of the Society of Behavioral Medicine.

== Research ==
Pagoto's research focuses on applying behavioural science to chronic disease prevention. In 2011 she published Psychological Co-morbidities of Physical Illness with Springer Nature. In her research, she uses online social networks to create patient communities that provide evidence-based health promotion programs for people at risk of chronic disease. Pagoto has designed several mobile apps that providing support for the management of diet, exercise, depression, and stress reduction. She has developed a range of randomised trials to investigate the effectiveness of effectiveness of behavioural treatments for depression, obesity, and other chronic conditions. Her work is supported by several large National Institutes of Health grants. For example, the recent RELAX application suite provides a patient-facing mobile application, including opportunities to self-monitor (diet, exercise, stress etc.) and stress-management features, where data is linked to the Microsoft HealthVault.

Pagoto is also concerned about skin cancer and excessive ultraviolet radiation exposure from the sun and artificial sources. She has done several studies examining “tanning addiction". She also documented the prevalence of tanning beds on top US college campuses, which led to the development of the Indoor Tan-Free Skin Smart Campus, an initiative sponsored by the National Council on Skin Cancer Prevention. She co-chairs the initiative which encourages U.S. college campuses to adopt skin cancer prevention policies. Several universities have adopted the policy, including University of North Florida, East Tennessee State University, and Temple University. She has proposed a means to use social media to engage mothers, in an effort to reduce the tanning of teenage daughters. The messages will be sent on Twitter, YouTube, Facebook, Pinterest and Instagram.

Pagoto has written for The Conversation, Med City News, The Boston Globe and The Washington Post. She has written and/or commented on the topic of gender equality in Salon, Times Higher Education, USA Today, and Self magazine.

=== Awards and honours ===
2017 University of Massachusetts Medical School Mentoring Women Faculty Award

2016 Society of Behavioural Medicine Distinguished Service Award

2014 University of Massachusetts Medical School Women in Science and Health Achievement Award

2014 The Obesity Society Pioneer in mHealth/eHealth Award

2011 Western Michigan University Distinguished Alumni Award

2009 Society of Behavioral Medicine Fellow

2006 Society of Behavioural Medicine Early Career Award
