= Matteo Spreafico =

Italian cyclist

Personal information
- Full name: Matteo Spreafico
- Born: 15 February 1993 (age 33) Erba, Lombardy, Italy

Cycling career
- Sport: Cycling
- Current team: Provisionally suspended
- Discipline: Road
- Role: Rider

Amateur team
- 2012: Team Idea (stagiaire)

Professional teams
- 2013–2015: Team Idea
- 2016: Kolss BDC Team
- 2017–2020: Androni Giocattoli–Sidermec
- 2020: Vini Zabù–KTM

Matteo Spreafico (born 15 February 1993) is an Italian cyclist, who is provisionally suspended from the sport, following a positive drugs test.

In October 2020, he was named in the startlist for the 2020 Giro d'Italia. On 22 October 2020, the UCI announced that Spreafico had returned two Adverse Analytical Findings (AAF) for Enobosarm at the Giro d'Italia, and was provisionally suspended. He was sacked by his team, Vini Zabù–Brado–KTM.

== Major results ==
2011
4th Overall Tre Ciclistica Internazionale Bresciana
2014
4th Trofeo Edil C
2016
10th Overall Tour of Bulgaria
2017
7th Overall Tour of China II
2018
1st Overall Vuelta a Venezuela

1st Stage 5 (ITT)

7th Overall Tour of China II
10th Overall Tour de Hongrie

=== Grand Tour general classification results timeline ===
Grand Tour	2020
Giro d'Italia	DNF
Tour de France	—
Vuelta a España	—

Legend
—	Did not compete
DNF	Did not finish
