= 2021 UCI America Tour =

- Seventeenth edition of the UCI America Tour

Details
- Dates: 21 November 2020 – 31 October 2021
- Location: North America and South America
- Races: 12

The 2021 UCI America Tour was the seventeenth season of the UCI America Tour. The season begins on 17 January 2021 with the Vuelta al Táchira and ended on 31 October 2021 with the last stage of the Tour Cycliste International de la Guadeloupe.

The points leader, based on the cumulative results of previous races, wears the UCI America Tour cycling jersey. Throughout the season, points are awarded to the top finishers of stages within stage races and the final general classification standings of each of the stages races and one-day events. The quality and complexity of a race also determines how many points are awarded to the top finishers, the higher the UCI rating of a race, the more points are awarded.

The UCI ratings from highest to lowest are as follows:

- Multi-day events: 2.Pro, 2.1 and 2.2
- One-day events: 1.Pro, 1.1 and 1.2

== Events ==
=== 2020 ===
Races in the 2020 UCI America Tour
Race	Rating	Date	Winner	Team
(Panama) Road Elite Caribbean Championships (ITT)	1.2	21 November	Christofer Jurado (PAN)	Panama (national team)
(Panama) Road Elite Caribbean Championships (RR)	1.2	22 November	Alex Strah (PAN)	Panama (national team)
Vuelta al Ecuador	2.2	23–28 November	Santiago Montenegro (ECU)	Ecuador (national team)

=== 2021 ===
Races in the 2021 UCI America Tour
Race	Rating	Date	Winner	Team
(Venezuela) Vuelta al Táchira en Bicicleta	2.2	17–24 January	Roniel Campos (VEN)	Team Atlético Venezuela
Vuelta a Colombia	2.2	16–25 April	José Tito Hernández (COL)	Team Medellín
(Dominican Republic) Road Elite Caribbean Championships RR	1.2	12 August	Joshua Kelly (BAR)	Barbados (national team)
(Dominican Republic) Road Elite Caribbean Championships ITT	1.2	13 August	Conor White (BER)	Bermuda (national team)
(Antigua and Barbuda) Subway 3 – Stage Race	2.2	21–22 August	Jeffery Kelsick (ATG)	Team Terminix Cycling
(United States) Joe Martin Stage Race	2.2	26–29 August	Tyler Williams (USA)	L39ION of Los Angeles
(El Salvador) Elite Road Central American Championships – ME – ITT	1.2	3 September	Franklin Archibold (PAN)	Panama (national team)
(El Salvador) Elite Road Central American Championships – ME – IRR	1.2	5 September	Christofer Jurado (PAN)	Panama (national team)
Tour Cycliste International de la Guadeloupe	2.2	22–31 October	Stefan Bennett (FRA)	Team Pro Immo Nicolas Roux
