= Platak =

Ski resort north of Rijeka, Croatia

Coordinates: 45°25′N 14°34′E

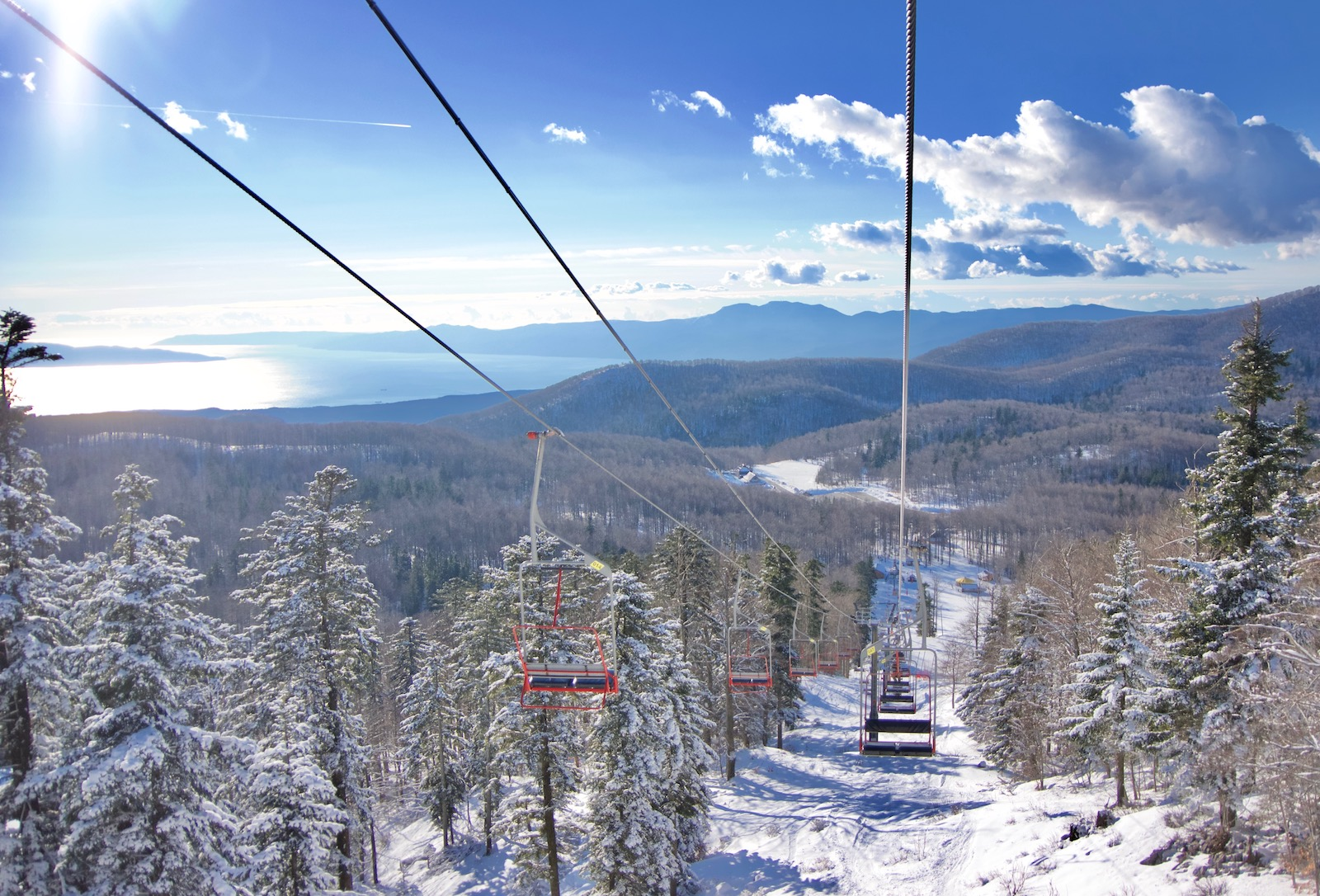
View from Platak

Platak is a ski resort located north of Rijeka, Croatia.

== Climate ==
A weather station exists there at an elevation of 1,128 metres (3,701 ft). The minimum recorded temperature for the winter of 2024–2025 was −9.8 °C (14.4 °F), on February 19th.

== Mountain huts ==
In the 1935–1936 season, the mountain hut on Platak at 1,115 metres (3,658 ft), open year-round, saw 128 visitors. No data was released for the 1936–1937 season. In the 1937–1938 season it saw 3139 visitors, more than any other within HPS territory besides Tomislavov Dom on Sljeme, including 66 Italian, 3 French, 3 Austrian and 2 Czechoslovak citizens. But on 15 January 1938 it burned down.

== Bibliography ==
=== Biology ===
- Šašić, Martina; Nahirnić, Ana; Tarmann, Gerhard M. (2016-12-31). "Zygaenidae (Lepidoptera) in the Lepidoptera collections of the Croatian Natural History Museum". Natura Croatica: Periodicum Musei Historiae Naturalis Croatici. 25 (2): 233–248. doi:10.20302/NC.2016.25.19. eISSN 1848-7386.
