= Raffaello Bonusi =

Italian cyclist (born 1992)

Personal information
- Born: 31 January 1992 (age 34) Gavardo, Italy

Cycling career
- Sport: Cycling
- Current team: Retired
- Discipline: Road
- Role: Rider

Amateur teams
- 2011: Team Idea
- 2012: Gavardo Tecmor
- 2013: Palazzago–Fenice–Elledent
- 2014: Marchiol–Emisfero
- 2015–2016: General Store Bottoli Zardini

Professional teams
- 2016: Androni Giocattoli–Sidermec (stagiaire)
- 2017–2018: Androni Giocattoli–Sidermec

Raffaello Bonusi (born 31 January 1992 in Gavardo) is an Italian former cyclist, who rode professionally for UCI Professional Continental team Androni Giocattoli–Sidermec in 2017 and 2018.

== Major results ==
2010
1st Trofeo Città Di Ivrea
8th Gran Premio dell'Arno
2013
10th Giro del Medio Brenta
2014
9th Trofeo Città di San Vendemiano
2015
7th Coppa della Pace
2016
1st Overall Tour of China I

1st Stage 3

2017
1st Stage 1 Vuelta al Táchira
10th Overall Tour of China II
