= Andrea Pagoto =

Italian cyclist

Personal information
- Born: 11 July 1985 (age 41) Montecchio Emilia, Italy

Cycling career
- Sport: Cycling
- Discipline: Road
- Role: Rider

Professional teams
- 2006–2008: Ceramiche Panaria-Navigare
- 2009: Team Utensilnord

Andrea Pagoto (born 11 July 1985 in Montecchio Emilia) is an Italian cyclist. He rode in the 2007 Giro d'Italia.

== Palmares ==
2005
1st Milano-Busseto
2006
10th Giro di Lombardia
2008
8th Giro d'Oro
