= Luca Solari =

Italian cyclist

Personal information
- Full name: Luca Solari
- Born: 2 October 1979 (age 47) Castel San Giovanni, Italy
- Height: 1.75 m (5 ft 9 in)
- Weight: 61 kg (134 lb)

Cycling career
- Sport: Cycling
- Discipline: Road
- Role: Rider
- Rider type: Sprinter

Professional teams
- 2003: Mercatone Uno–Scanavino
- 2004: Barloworld
- 2005: Domina Vacanze
- 2006: 3C Casalinghi Jet-Androni Giocattoli
- 2007: Team LPR
- 2008–2011: Diquigiovanni–Androni

Luca Solari (born 2 October 1979 in Castel San Giovanni) is an Italian racing cyclist, who last rode for UCI Professional Continental team Androni Giocattoli.

== Palmarès ==
2001
1st Coppa Città di Asti
2003
1st, Stage 4, Ster Elektrotoer
2007
1st, Grand Prix Pino Cerami
