= Luca Barla =

Italian road bicycle racer for Team Idea

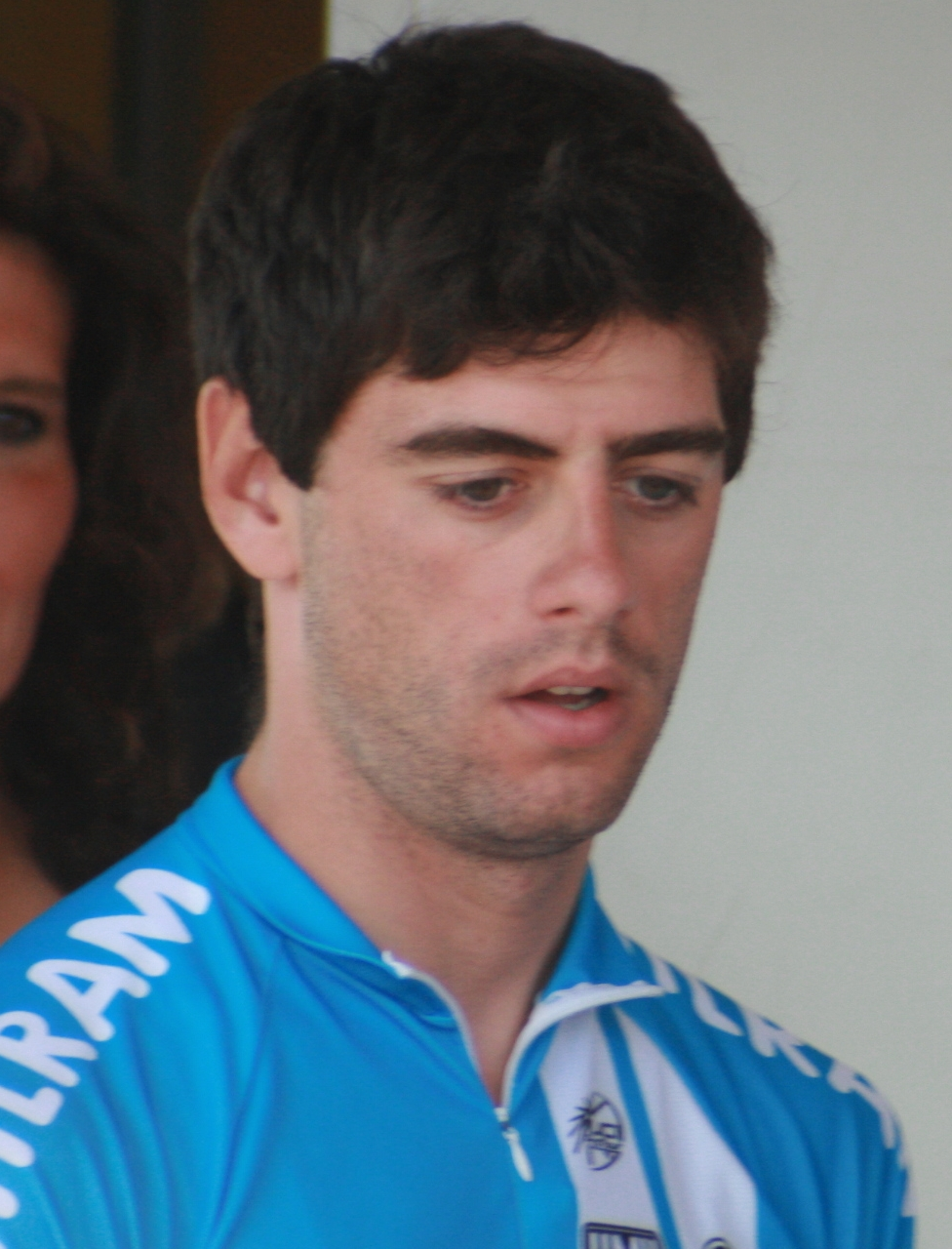

Personal information
- Full name: Luca Barla
- Born: 29 September 1987 (age 39) Bordighera, Italy

Cycling career
- Sport: Cycling
- Current team: Team Idea
- Discipline: Road
- Role: Rider

Professional teams
- 2007: → Team Milram (stagiaire)
- 2008–2009: Team Milram
- 2011: Androni Giocattoli
- 2012–: Team Idea

Luca Barla (born 29 September 1987) is an Italian road bicycle racer for Team Idea.

== Palmares ==
1998
1st Coppa Città di Asti
2005
Italy U19 Road Race Champion
