= Félix Pouilly =

French cyclist

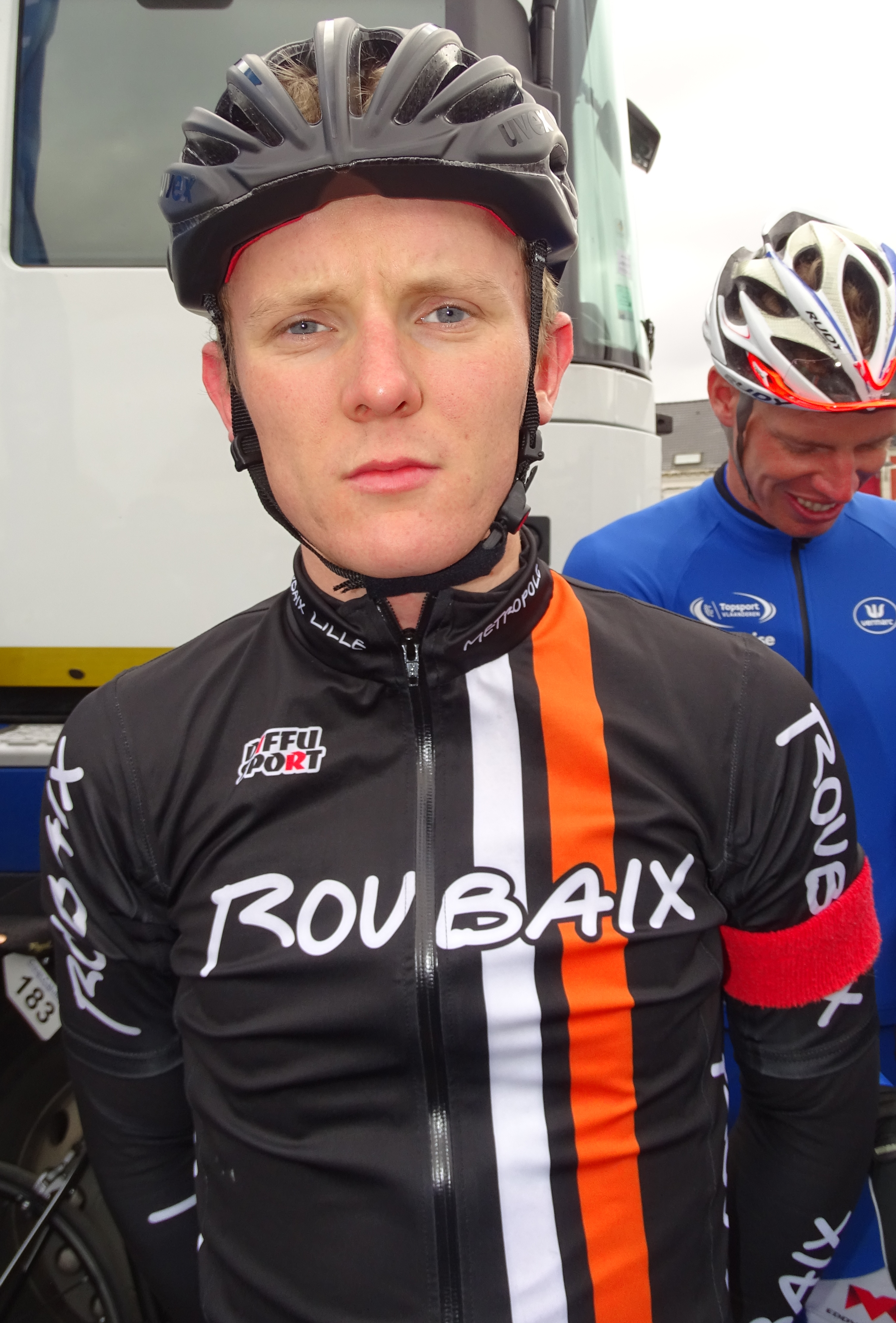
- Pouilly in 2016

Personal information
- Born: 22 September 1994 (age 32) Lille, France
- Height: 1.79 m (5 ft 10 in)
- Weight: 66 kg (146 lb)

Cycling career
- Sport: Cycling
- Current team: Retired
- Discipline: Road
- Role: Rider

Amateur teams
- 2013–2015: CC Nogent-sur-Oise
- 2019: UV Fourmies
- 2019: Olympique Grande-Synthe

Professional teams
- 2013: To Win–Josan (stagiaire)
- 2015: Roubaix–Lille Métropole (stagiaire)
- 2016–2017: Roubaix–Métropole Européenne de Lille

Félix Pouilly (born 22 September 1994) is a French former professional road cyclist.

== Major results ==
2012
1st Road race, National Junior Road Championships
1st Stage 3 Regio-Tour Juniors
8th Paris–Roubaix Juniors
2015
4th Paris–Roubaix Espoirs
2016
4th Paris–Troyes
