= Martí Vigo del Arco =

Spanish cross-country skier and cyclist

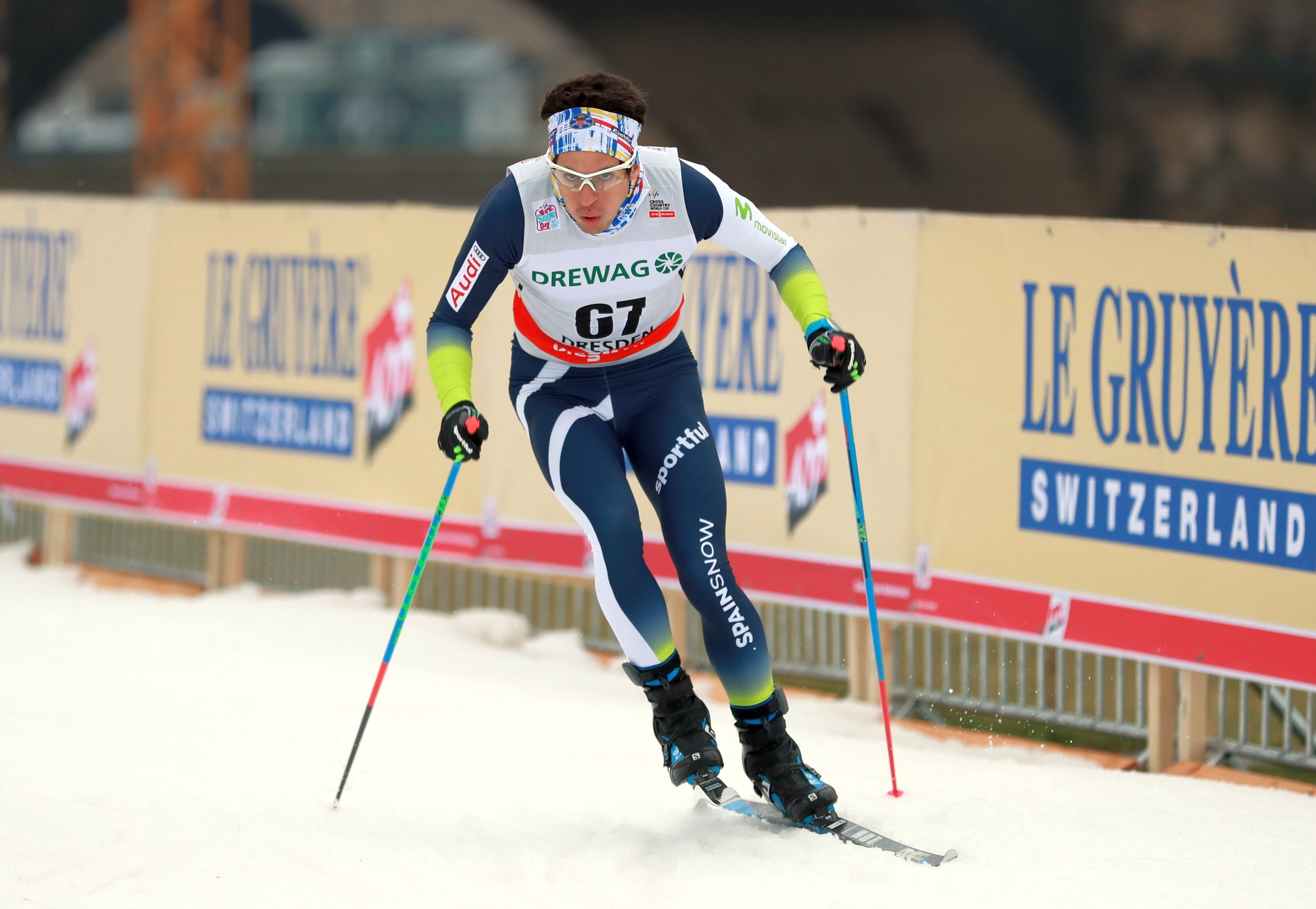
- Vigo del Arco in 2018

Personal information
- Born: 22 December 1997 (age 28) Sesué, Spain

Sport
- Sport: Cross-country skiing, road bicycle racing
- Cycling career
- Sport: Cycling
- Discipline: Road
- Role: Rider

Amateur team
- 2020: Telco'm–On Clima–Oses

Professional team
- 2021–2022: Androni Giocattoli–Sidermec

Martí Vigo del Arco (born December 22, 1997) is a Spanish sportsperson, who participated in cross-country skiing at the 2018 Winter Olympics. In 2020, Vigo del Arco transitioned to road bicycle racing with the Telco'm–On Clima–Oses team.

For the 2021 season, Vigo del Arco turned professional with the Androni Giocattoli–Sidermec team, having signed a two-year contract.

== Biography ==
He started practicing sports at three years of age in Llanos del Hospital. In 2014, 2016 and 2017 he participated in the Junior World Championships, achieving in his last participation a 14th place in the 10 kilometer event. This result earned him the Carolina Ruiz award, awarded by the Spanish Federation to the best athlete with a projection.

His first appearance in the World Cup was in 2018 in Dresden, finishing in 67th place and 22nd in team.

== Results in the Olympic Games ==
Year	Location	Date	Discipline	Position
2018	Pyeongchang, South Korea	16 Feb 2018	15km	DNF
2018	Pyeongchang, South Korea	21 Feb 2018	Team Sprint F	19th
