= Marco Frapporti =

Italian cyclist

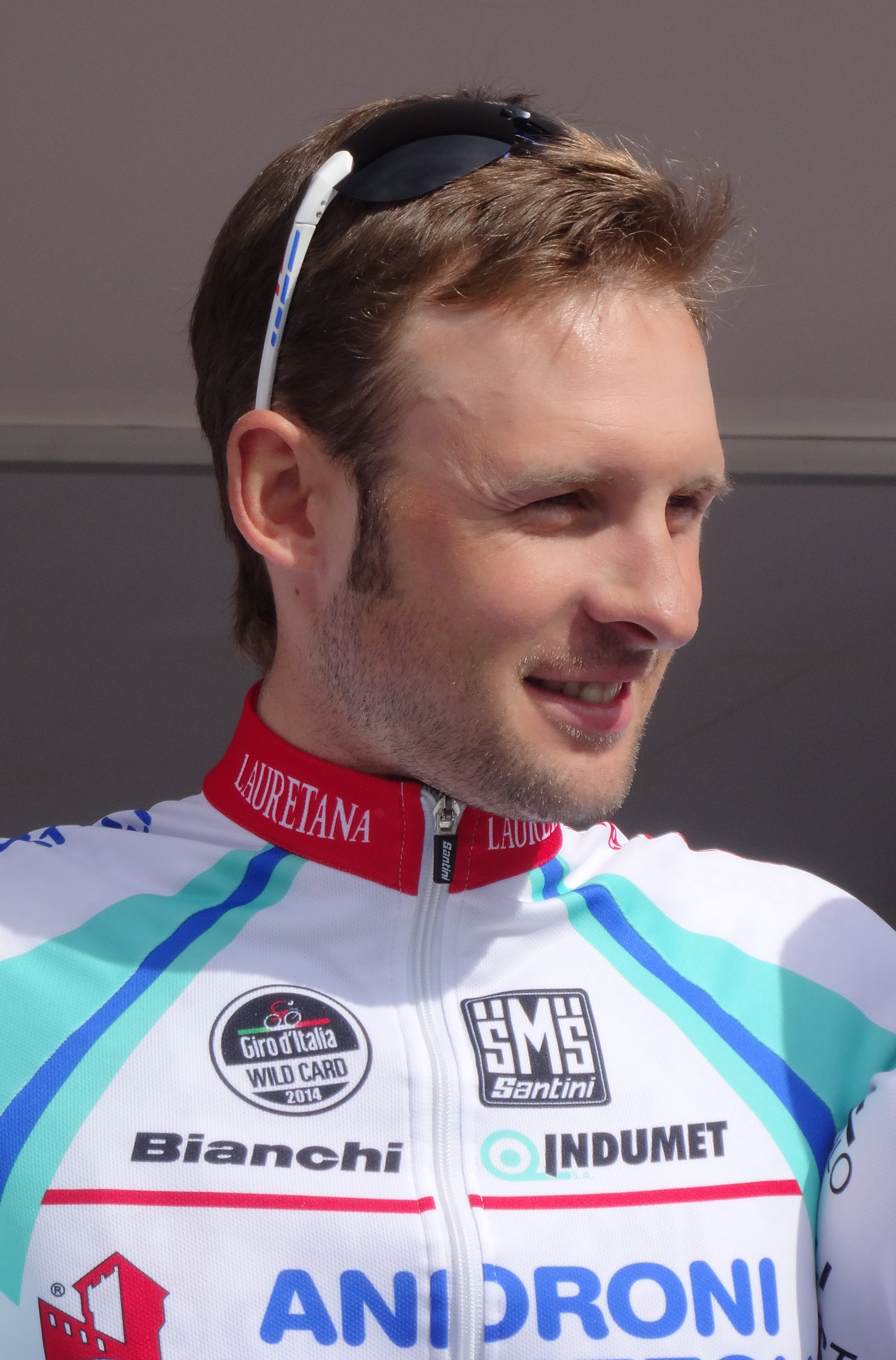
- Frapporti in 2014.

Personal information
- Full name: Marco Frapporti
- Born: 30 March 1985 (age 41) Gavardo, Italy
- Height: 1.79 m (5 ft 10 in)
- Weight: 69 kg (152 lb)

Cycling career
- Sport: Cycling
- Discipline: Road
- Role: Rider

Professional teams
- 2008–2011: CSF Group–Navigare
- 2012: Team Idea
- 2013–2019: Androni Giocattoli–Venezuela
- 2020–2021: Vini Zabù–KTM

Marco Frapporti (born 30 March 1985) is an Italian racing cyclist, who last rode for UCI ProTeam Vini Zabù.

== Major results ==
2005
3rd Circuito del Porto
2006
6th Trofeo Città di Brescia
2007
1st Giro del Canavese
1st Piccolo Giro di Lombardia
2008
2nd Gran Premio Industria e Commercio di Prato
2009
7th Overall Giro della Provincia di Grosseto

1st Stage 2

7th Gran Premio della Costa Etruschi
8th Hel van het Mergelland
8th Overall Tour of Turkey
2010
5th Gran Premio Bruno Beghelli
10th Overall Tour of Britain

1st Stage 5

2011
1st Stage 1 Brixia Tour
2012
6th Gran Premio della Costa Etruschi
6th Trofeo Laigueglia
6th Giro di Toscana
7th Overall Giro della Provincia di Reggio Calabria
2013
1st Stage 4 Route du Sud
3rd Grand Prix of Aargau Canton
6th Giro dell'Appennino
2016
2nd Overall Four Days of Dunkirk
2017
2nd Gran Premio di Lugano
2018
6th Coppa Bernocchi

=== Grand Tour general classification results timeline ===
Grand Tour	2010	2011	2012	2013	2014	2015	2016	2017	2018	2019	2020
Giro d'Italia	138	132	—	—	108	98	—	—	119	81	108
Tour de France	Has not contested during his career										
Vuelta a España	Has not contested during his career										

Legend
—	Did not compete
DNF	Did not finish
