= Marco Benfatto =

Italian cyclist

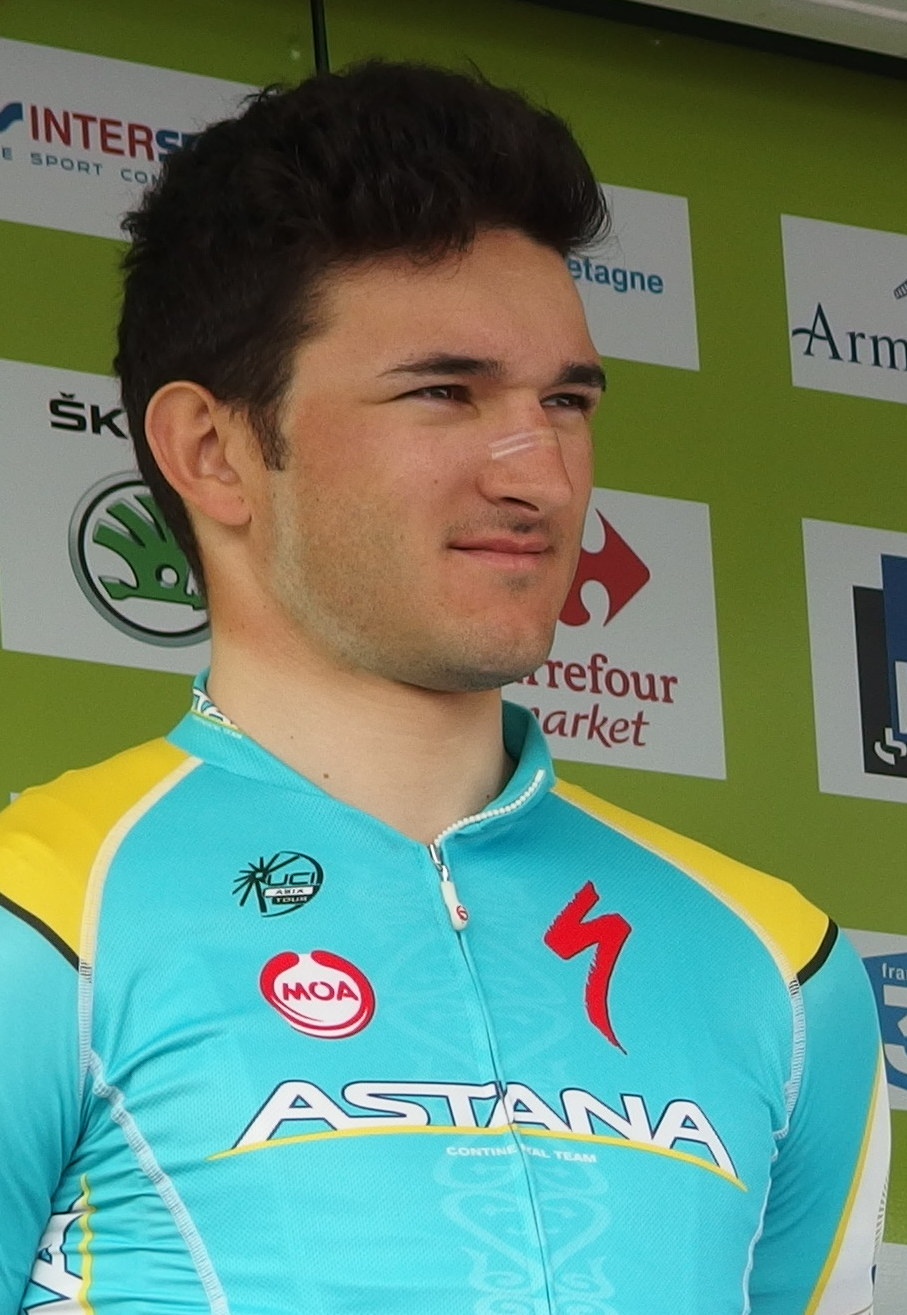
- Marco Benfatto in 2014

Personal information
- Born: 6 January 1988 (age 38) Camposampiero, Italy

Cycling career
- Sport: Cycling
- Discipline: Road
- Role: Rider
- Rider type: Sprinter

Amateur teams
- 2007–2011: Zalf Désirée Fior
- 2012: Team Idea

Professional teams
- 2012: Liquigas–Cannondale (stagiaire)
- 2013–2014: Continental Team Astana
- 2015–2019: Androni Giocattoli
- 2020: Bardiani–CSF–Faizanè

Marco Benfatto (born 6 January 1988) is an Italian professional racing cyclist, who most recently rode for UCI ProTeam Bardiani–CSF–Faizanè.

== Major results ==
2012
1st Stage 1 Giro del Friuli-Venezia Giulia
1st Stage 2a Giro Ciclistico d'Italia
2013
2nd Riga Grand Prix
3rd Poreč Trophy
4th Trofej Umag
4th Jūrmala Grand Prix
10th Race Horizon Park 1
2014
Tour of Qinghai Lake

1st Stages 2 & 4

1st Stage 5 Tour de Normandie
9th Overall Tour of China II
2016
1st Overall Tour of China II

1st Points classification
1st Stages 1, 4 & 5

Tour of China I

1st Points classification
1st Stages 1, 2 & 6

Tour of Bihor

1st Points classification
1st Stages 2 & 3

2017
Tour of China II

1st Stages 3 & 4

1st Stage 5 Tour of China I
9th La Roue Tourangelle
2018
Tour of China I

1st Stages 3 & 5

1st Stage 7 Tour of Hainan
1st Stage 4 Vuelta a Venezuela
2019
Tour of China I

1st Points classification
1st Stage 1 & 5

Tour of China II

1st Stage 1 & 2

Tour of Taihu Lake

1st Stages 1 & 6

1st Stage 1 Vuelta al Táchira
1st Stage 8 Tour de Langkawi
2020
5th Trofej Umag
