= Tour of China =

Chinese multi-day road cycling races

Race details
- Date: September
- Region: China
- Local name(s): 环中国国际公路自行车赛 (in Chinese)
- Discipline: Road
- Competition: UCI Asia Tour 2.1
- Type: Stage race
- Web site: www.thetourofchina.com

History
- First edition: 1995
- Editions: 16 (as of 2019)
- First winner: Viatcheslav Ekimov (RUS)
- Most recent: Jeroen Meijers (NED) (Tour of China I); Lyu Xianjing (CHN) (Tour of China II)

The Tour of China is an annual professional road bicycle racing stage race held in China since 1995. The race is sanctioned by the International Cycling Union (UCI) as a 2.1 category race as part of the UCI Asia Tour.

Since 2012, there are two parts of the Tour of China, Tour of China I and Tour of China II.

== Past winners ==
=== Tour of China ===
Year	Country	Rider	Team
1995	Russia	Viatcheslav Ekimov	Novell–Decca–Colnago
1996	Sweden	Michael Andersson	Team Telekom
1997– 2001	No race		
2002	Japan	Makoto Iijima	Japan (national team)
2003	Japan	Yoshiyuki Abe	Shimano Racing
2004	Japan	Koji Fukushima	Bridgestone Anchor
2005	Kazakhstan	Andrey Mizourov	Cycling Team Capec
2006– 2009	No race		
2010	Germany	Dirk Müller	Team Nutrixxion-Sparkasse
2011	Uzbekistan	Muradjan Khalmuratov	Giant Kenda Cycling Team

=== Tour of China I ===
Year	Country	Rider	Team
2012	Denmark	Martin Pedersen	Christina Watches–Onfone
2013	Russia	Kirill Pozdnyakov	Synergy Baku
2014	Poland	Kamil Gradek	BDC Marcpol
2015	Italy	Daniele Colli	Nippo–Vini Fantini
2016	Italy	Raffaello Bonusi	Androni Giocattoli–Sidermec
2017	Italy	Liam Bertazzo	Wilier Triestina–Selle Italia
2018	Colombia	Juan Sebastián Molano	Team Manzana Postobón
2019	Netherlands	Jeroen Meijers	Taiyuan Miogee Cycling Team

=== Tour of China II ===
Year	Country	Rider	Team
2012	Germany	Stefan Schumacher	Christina Watches–Onfone
2013	Czech Republic	Alois Kaňkovský	ASC Dukla Praha
2014	Russia	Boris Shpilevsky	RTS–Santic Racing Team
2015	Italy	Mattia Gavazzi	Amore & Vita–Selle SMP
2016	Italy	Marco Benfatto	Androni Giocattoli–Sidermec
2017	Costa Rica	Kevin Rivera	Androni–Sidermec–Bottecchia
2018	Portugal	Alejandro Marque	Sporting / Tavira
2019	China	Xianjing Lyu	Hengxiang Cycling Team
