= Rino Zampilli =

Italian cyclist

Personal information
- Full name: Rino Zampilli
- Born: 7 March 1984 (age 42) Venafro, Italy

Cycling career
- Sport: Cycling
- Current team: Retired
- Discipline: Road
- Role: Rider

Professional teams
- 2006–2007: Naturino–Sapore di Mare
- 2008: Katay Cycling Team
- 2010: Hemus 1896–Vivelo
- 2015: Amore & Vita–Selle SMP
- 2016: Team Roth

Rino Zampilli (born 7 March 1984 in Venafro) is an Italian former professional cyclist.

== Major results ==
2009
Tour of Romania

1st Stages 2 & 4

1st Stage 2 Tour of Szeklerland
2nd Banja Luka–Belgrade
