= Mattia Frapporti =

Italian cyclist

Personal information
- Full name: Mattia Frapporti
- Born: 2 July 1994 (age 32) Gavardo, Lombardy, Italy
- Height: 1.82 m (6 ft 0 in)
- Weight: 74 kg (163 lb)

Cycling career
- Sport: Cycling
- Current team: Retired
- Discipline: Road
- Role: Rider

Amateur teams
- 2009–2010: Valle Sabbia Delio Gallina
- 2011: Capriolo SC
- 2012: G.C. Feralpi
- 2013: U.C. Trevigiani–Dynamon–Bottoli

Professional teams
- 2014–2016: MG Kvis–Trevigiani
- 2017–2020: Androni Giocattoli–Sidermec
- 2021: Eolo–Kometa

Mattia Frapporti (born 2 July 1994) is an Italian former racing cyclist, who competed as a professional from 2014 to 2021. He rode at the 2014 UCI Road World Championships.

== Major results ==
2012
3rd Trofeo Comune di Vertova
5th Trofeo Emilio Paganessi
6th Trofeo Buffoni
2016
4th Trofeo Edil C
7th Overall Tour de Serbie
2017
1st Stage 1 Tour du Jura
2019
6th Overall Tour of China II
