= 2019 Giro di Sicilia =

24th edition of the Giro di Sicilia

2019 UCI Europe Tour

Race details
- Dates: 3–6 April 2019
- Stages: 4
- Distance: 708 km (439.9 mi)
- Winning time: 18h 07' 24"

Results
Jersey awarded to the overall winner	Winner	Brandon McNulty (USA)	(Rally UHC Cycling)
	Second	Guillaume Martin (FRA)	(Wanty–Gobert)
	Third	Fausto Masnada (ITA)	(Androni Giocattoli–Sidermec)
Jersey awarded to the points classification winner	Points	Manuel Belletti (ITA)	(Androni Giocattoli–Sidermec)
Jersey awarded to the mountains classification winner	Mountains	Fausto Masnada (ITA)	(Androni Giocattoli–Sidermec)
Jersey awarded to the youth classification winner	Youth	Brandon McNulty (USA)	(Rally UHC Cycling)

The 2019 Giro di Sicilia was the twenty-fourth edition of the Giro di Sicilia, a men's multi-stage bicycle race. It was held between 3 and 6 June 2019 and was organised as a 2.1 event in the UCI Europe Tour. The race was won by Brandon McNulty (Rally UHC Cycling).

== Route ==
Stage characteristics and winners
Stage	Date	Course	Distance	Type	Stage winner
1	3 April	Catania to Milazzo	165 km (103 mi)	Hilly stage	Riccardo Stacchiotti (ITA)
2	4 April	Capo d'Orlando to Palermo	236 km (147 mi)	Medium mountain stage	Manuel Belletti (ITA)
3	5 April	Caltanissetta to Ragusa	188 km (117 mi)	Mountain stage	Brandon McNulty (USA)
4	6 April	Giardini Naxos to Etna	119 km (74 mi)	Mountain stage	Guillaume Martin (FRA)
Total		708 km (440 mi)			

== Teams ==
One UCI WorldTeam, ten UCI Professional Continental teams, and seven UCI Continental teams made up the eighteen teams that participated in the race. Of these teams, three teams (Nippo–Vini Fantini–Faizanè, Riwal Readynez, and Sangemini–Trevigiani–MG.K Vis) entered only six riders each, while the rest entered seven each. 77 of the 123 riders in the race finished.

UCI WorldTeams

- UAE Team Emirates

UCI Professional Continental Teams

- Androni Giocattoli–Sidermec
- Bardiani–CSF
- Delko–Marseille Provence
- Gazprom–RusVelo
- Israel Cycling Academy
- Neri Sottoli–Selle Italia–KTM
- Nippo–Vini Fantini–Faizanè
- Rally UHC Cycling
- Riwal Readynez
- Wanty–Gobert

UCI Continental Teams

- Amore & Vita–Prodir
- Coldeportes Bicicletas Strongman
- D'Amico–UM Tools
- Giotti Victoria–Palomar
- Kometa Cycling Team
- Sangemini–Trevigiani–MG.K Vis
- Team Colpack

== Stages ==
=== Stage 1 ===
3 April 2019 – Catania to Milazzo, 165 km (103 mi)

Stage 1 Result
Rank	Rider	Team	Time
1	Riccardo Stacchiotti (ITA)	Giotti Victoria–Palomar	3h 48' 2"
2	Manuel Belletti (ITA)	Androni Giocattoli–Sidermec	+ 0"
3	Luca Pacioni (ITA)	Neri Sottoli–Selle Italia–KTM	+ 0"
4	Sergey Shilov (RUS)	Gazprom–RusVelo	+ 0"
5	Juan Sebastián Molano (COL)	UAE Team Emirates	+ 0"
6	Iuri Filosi (ITA)	Delko–Marseille Provence	+ 0"
7	Marco Tizza (ITA)	Amore & Vita–Prodir	+ 0"
8	Vincenzo Albanese (ITA)	Bardiani–CSF	+ 0"
9	Damiano Cima (ITA)	Nippo–Vini Fantini–Faizanè	+ 0"
10	Colin Joyce (USA)	Rally UHC Cycling	+ 0"

General classification after Stage 1
Rank	Rider	Team	Time
1	Riccardo Stacchiotti (ITA)	Giotti Victoria–Palomar	3h 47' 52"
2	Manuel Belletti (ITA)	Androni Giocattoli–Sidermec	+ 4"
3	Luca Pacioni (ITA)	Neri Sottoli–Selle Italia–KTM	+ 6"
4	Krister Hagen (NOR)	Riwal Readynez	+ 7"
5	Sergey Shilov (RUS)	Gazprom–RusVelo	+ 10"
6	Juan Sebastián Molano (COL)	UAE Team Emirates	+ 10"
7	Iuri Filosi (ITA)	Delko–Marseille Provence	+ 10"
8	Marco Tizza (ITA)	Amore & Vita–Prodir	+ 10"
9	Vincenzo Albanese (ITA)	Bardiani–CSF	+ 10"
10	Damiano Cima (ITA)	Nippo–Vini Fantini–Faizanè	+ 10"

=== Stage 2 ===
4 April 2019 – Capo d'Orlando to Palermo, 236 km (147 mi)

Stage 2 Result
Rank	Rider	Team	Time
1	Manuel Belletti (ITA)	Androni Giocattoli–Sidermec	5h 59' 16"
2	Riccardo Stacchiotti (ITA)	Giotti Victoria–Palomar	+ 0"
3	Juan Sebastián Molano (COL)	UAE Team Emirates	+ 0"
4	Riccardo Minali (ITA)	Israel Cycling Academy	+ 0"
5	Colin Joyce (USA)	Rally UHC Cycling	+ 0"
6	Sergey Shilov (RUS)	Gazprom–RusVelo	+ 0"
7	Paolo Totò (ITA)	Sangemini–Trevigiani–MG.K Vis	+ 0"
8	Emanuele Onesti (ITA)	Giotti Victoria–Palomar	+ 0"
9	Marco Tizza (ITA)	Amore & Vita–Prodir	+ 0"
10	Marco Bernardinetti (ITA)	Amore & Vita–Prodir	+ 0"

General classification after Stage 2
Rank	Rider	Team	Time
1	Manuel Belletti (ITA)	Androni Giocattoli–Sidermec	9h 47' 02"
2	Riccardo Stacchiotti (ITA)	Giotti Victoria–Palomar	+ 0"
3	Juan Sebastián Molano (COL)	UAE Team Emirates	+ 12"
4	Luca Pacioni (ITA)	Neri Sottoli–Selle Italia–KTM	+ 12"
5	Krister Hagen (NOR)	Riwal Readynez	+ 13"
6	Andreas Kron (DEN)	Riwal Readynez	+ 13"
7	Andrea Toniatti (ITA)	Team Colpack	+ 14"
8	Viesturs Luksevics (LAT)	Amore & Vita–Prodir	+ 15"
9	Sergey Shilov (RUS)	Gazprom–RusVelo	+ 16"
10	Colin Joyce (USA)	Rally UHC Cycling	+ 16"

=== Stage 3 ===
5 April 2019 – Caltanissetta to Ragusa, 188 km (117 mi)

Stage 3 Result
Rank	Rider	Team	Time
1	Brandon McNulty (USA)	Rally UHC Cycling	4h 42' 28"
2	Odd Christian Eiking (NOR)	Wanty–Gobert	+ 55"
3	Giovanni Visconti (ITA)	Neri Sottoli–Selle Italia–KTM	+ 56"
4	Federico Zurlo (ITA)	Giotti Victoria–Palomar	+ 56"
5	Paolo Totò (ITA)	Sangemini–Trevigiani–MG.K Vis	+ 56"
6	Matteo Montaguti (ITA)	Androni Giocattoli–Sidermec	+ 56"
7	Jan Polanc (SLO)	UAE Team Emirates	+ 56"
8	Simone Petilli (ITA)	UAE Team Emirates	+ 56"
9	Guillaume Martin (FRA)	Wanty–Gobert	+ 56"
10	Fausto Masnada (ITA)	Androni Giocattoli–Sidermec	+ 56"

General classification after Stage 3
Rank	Rider	Team	Time
1	Brandon McNulty (USA)	Rally UHC Cycling	14h 29' 36"
2	Odd Christian Eiking (NOR)	Wanty–Gobert	+ 59"
3	Giovanni Visconti (ITA)	Neri Sottoli–Selle Italia–KTM	+ 1' 02"
4	Marco Tizza (ITA)	Amore & Vita–Prodir	+ 1' 06"
5	Paolo Totò (ITA)	Sangemini–Trevigiani–MG.K Vis	+ 1' 06"
6	Guillaume Martin (FRA)	Wanty–Gobert	+ 1' 06"
7	Jan Polanc (SLO)	UAE Team Emirates	+ 1' 06"
8	Matteo Montaguti (ITA)	Androni Giocattoli–Sidermec	+ 1' 06"
9	Aleksandr Vlasov (RUS)	Gazprom–RusVelo	+ 1' 06"
10	Simone Petilli (ITA)	UAE Team Emirates	+ 1' 06"

=== Stage 4 ===
6 April 2019 – Giardini Naxos to Etna, 119 km (74 mi)

Stage 4 Result
Rank	Rider	Team	Time
1	Guillaume Martin (FRA)	Wanty–Gobert	3h 37' 34"
2	Fausto Masnada (ITA)	Androni Giocattoli–Sidermec	+ 10"
3	Dayer Quintana (COL)	Neri Sottoli–Selle Italia–KTM	+ 13"
4	Brandon McNulty (USA)	Rally UHC Cycling	+ 14"
5	Aleksandr Vlasov (RUS)	Gazprom–RusVelo	+ 22"
6	Giovanni Visconti (ITA)	Neri Sottoli–Selle Italia–KTM	+ 36"
7	Jan Polanc (SLO)	UAE Team Emirates	+ 42"
8	Matteo Badilatti (SUI)	Israel Cycling Academy	+ 44"
9	Michel Ries (LUX)	Kometa Cycling Team	+ 47"
10	Mauro Finetto (ITA)	Delko–Marseille Provence	+ 1' 11"

General classification after Stage 4
Rank	Rider	Team	Time
1	Brandon McNulty (USA)	Rally UHC Cycling	18h 07' 24"
2	Guillaume Martin (FRA)	Wanty–Gobert	+ 42"
3	Fausto Masnada (ITA)	Amore & Vita–Prodir	+ 56"
4	Aleksandr Vlasov (RUS)	Gazprom–RusVelo	+ 1' 11"
5	Giovanni Visconti (ITA)	Neri Sottoli–Selle Italia–KTM	+ 1' 24"
6	Jan Polanc (SLO)	UAE Team Emirates	+ 1' 34"
7	Dayer Quintana (COL)	Neri Sottoli–Selle Italia–KTM	+ 2' 02"
8	Mauro Finetto (ITA)	Delko–Marseille Provence	+ 2' 03"
9	Michel Ries (LUX)	Kometa Cycling Team	+ 2' 11"
10	Simone Petilli (ITA)	UAE Team Emirates	+ 2' 16"

== Classification leadership ==
Stage	Winner	General classification	Points classification	Mountains classification	Young rider classification
1	Riccardo Stacchiotti	Riccardo Stacchiotti	Riccardo Stacchiotti	Isaac Cantón	Juan Sebastián Molano
2	Manuel Belletti	Manuel Belletti	Manuel Belletti	Isaac Cantón	Juan Sebastián Molano
3	Brandon McNulty	Brandon McNulty	Manuel Belletti	Fausto Masnada	Brandon McNulty
4	Guillaume Martin	Brandon McNulty	Manuel Belletti	Fausto Masnada	Brandon McNulty
Final		Brandon McNulty	Manuel Belletti	Fausto Masnada	Brandon McNulty

== Final classification standings ==
=== General classification ===
Final general classification (1–10)
Rank	Rider	Team	Time
1	Brandon McNulty (USA)	Rally UHC Cycling	18h 07' 24"
2	Guillaume Martin (FRA)	Wanty–Gobert	+ 42"
3	Fausto Masnada (ITA)	Amore & Vita–Prodir	+ 56"
4	Aleksandr Vlasov (RUS)	Gazprom–RusVelo	+ 1' 11"
5	Giovanni Visconti (ITA)	Neri Sottoli–Selle Italia–KTM	+ 1' 24"
6	Jan Polanc (SLO)	UAE Team Emirates	+ 1' 34"
7	Dayer Quintana (COL)	Neri Sottoli–Selle Italia–KTM	+ 2' 02"
8	Mauro Finetto (ITA)	Delko–Marseille Provence	+ 2' 03"
9	Michel Ries (LUX)	Kometa Cycling Team	+ 2' 11"
10	Simone Petilli (ITA)	UAE Team Emirates	+ 2' 16"

=== Points classification ===
Final points classification (1–10)
Rank	Rider	Team	Points
1	Manuel Belletti (ITA)	Amore & Vita–Prodir	25
2	Brandon McNulty (USA)	Rally UHC Cycling	19
3	Guillaume Martin (FRA)	Wanty–Gobert	14
4	Giovanni Visconti (ITA)	Neri Sottoli–Selle Italia–KTM	13
5	Sergey Shilov (RUS)	Gazprom–RusVelo	12
6	Aleksandr Vlasov (RUS)	Gazprom–RusVelo	11
7	Fausto Masnada (ITA)	Amore & Vita–Prodir	11
8	Odd Christian Eiking (NOR)	Wanty–Gobert	10
9	Paolo Totò (ITA)	Sangemini–Trevigiani–MG.K Vis	10
10	Colin Joyce (USA)	Rally UHC Cycling	9

=== Mountains classification ===
Final mountains classification (1–10)
Rank	Rider	Team	Points
1	Fausto Masnada (ITA)	Amore & Vita–Prodir	27
2	Guillaume Martin (FRA)	Wanty–Gobert	20
3	Brandon McNulty (USA)	Rally UHC Cycling	12
4	Aleksandr Vlasov (RUS)	Gazprom–RusVelo	12
5	Simone Petilli (ITA)	UAE Team Emirates	10
6	Dayer Quintana (COL)	Neri Sottoli–Selle Italia–KTM	9
7	Fabien Doubey (FRA)	Wanty–Gobert	5
8	Isaac Cantón (ESP)	Kometa Cycling Team	5
9	Diego Pablo Sevilla (ESP)	Kometa Cycling Team	5
10	Giovanni Visconti (ITA)	Neri Sottoli–Selle Italia–KTM	3

=== Young rider classification ===
Final young rider classification (1–10)
Rank	Rider	Team	Time
1	Brandon McNulty (USA)	Rally UHC Cycling	18h 07' 24"
2	Aleksandr Vlasov (RUS)	Gazprom–RusVelo	+ 1' 11"
3	Michel Ries (LUX)	Kometa Cycling Team	+ 2' 11"
4	Odd Christian Eiking (NOR)	Wanty–Gobert	+ 3' 25"
5	Juan Pedro López (ESP)	Kometa Cycling Team	+ 3' 36"
6	Alejandro Osorio (COL)	Nippo–Vini Fantini–Faizanè	+ 3' 58"
7	Simone Velasco (ITA)	Neri Sottoli–Selle Italia–KTM	+ 4' 08"
8	Federico Zurlo (ITA)	Giotti Victoria–Palomar	+ 5' 02"
9	Johnatan Cañaveral (COL)	Coldeportes Bicicletas Strongman	+ 5' 11"
10	Stefano Oldani (ITA)	Kometa Cycling Team	+ 6' 24"
