= Coppa Città di San Daniele =

Road cycling race in Friuli-Venezia Giulia, Italy

Race details
- Date: October
- Region: Friuli-Venezia Giulia, Italy
- English name: San Daniele Cup
- Local name: Coppa Città di San Daniele (in Italian)
- Discipline: Road
- Competition: UCI Europe Tour
- Type: Single-day

History
- First edition: 1933
- Editions: 88 (as of 2025)
- First winner: Ferdinando Gallina (ITA)
- Most recent: Lorenzo Finn (ITA)

Coppa Città di San Daniele is a single-day road bicycle race held annually in San Daniele del Friuli, Friuli-Venezia Giulia, Italy. The event is reserved for the Elite/Under-23 Amateur category and normally marks the end of the amateur season in Italy. Since 2023, the race has been organised as a 1.2 event on the UCI Europe Tour.

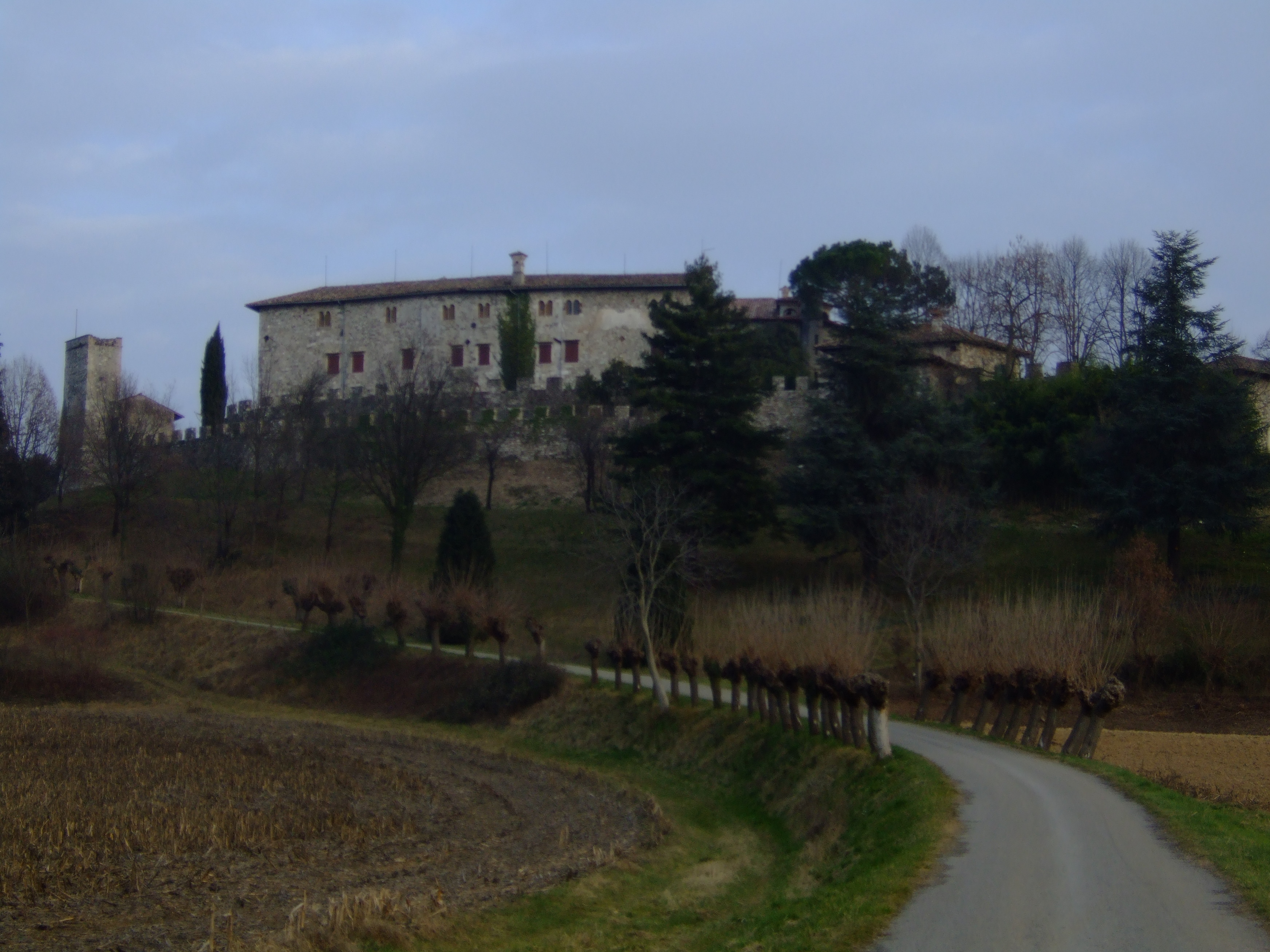
A climb to Castello d'Arcano is usually a part of the race

== Winners ==
Year	Winner	Second	Third
1933	(Italy) Ferdinando Gallina	(Italy) Giovanni Zandonà	(Italy) Pietro Boemo
1934	(Italy) Gastone Gardonio	(Italy) Corrado Bernava	(Italy) Vilfredo Perini
1935	(Italy) Vinicio Pellis	(Italy) Americo Candusso	(Italy) Mario Bertoni
1936	(Italy) Francesco Doccini	(Italy) Giovanni Lorenzini	(Italy) Pietro Boemo
1937	(Italy) Renzo Silvestri	(Italy) Angelo Degano	(Italy) Rodolfo Costantini
1938	(Italy) Nello Feruglio	(Italy) Camillo Beltrame	(Italy) Angelo Degano
1939	(Italy) Giovanni Lorenzini	(Italy) Nello Feruglio	(Italy) Egidio Feruglio
1940	(Italy) Giovanni Lorenzini	(Italy) Egidio Feruglio	(Italy) Ugo Peccolo
1941	(Italy) Egidio Feruglio		
1942-1946	Not disputed due to World War II		
1947	(Italy) Egidio Feruglio		
1948	(Italy) Luigi Cemulini		
1949	(Italy) Domenico De Zan		
1950	(Italy) Lino Florean		
1951	(Italy) Elso Macor		
1952	(Italy) Italo Colaone		
1953	(Italy) Umberto Peruch		
1954	(Italy) Rino Comuzzo		
1955	(Italy) Alfredo Sabbadin		
1956	(Italy) Rino Comuzzo		
1957	(Italy) Giorgio Menini		
1958	(Italy) Dino Liviero		
1959	(Italy) Agostino Ibrioli		
1960	(Italy) Amedeo Bettin		
1961	(Italy) Gianfranco Gallon		
1962	(Italy) Clay Santini		
1963	(Italy) Gianfranco Gallon		
1964	(Italy) Vito Zanin	(Italy) Antonio Tagliani	(Italy) Mario Zanin
1965	(Italy) Gino De Gobbi		
1966	(Italy) Luciano Dalla Bona		
1967	(Italy) Giuseppe Martinello		
1968	(Italy) Luigi Castelletti		
1969	(Italy) Mario Nicoletti (cyclist)		
1970	(Italy) Gino Fochesato		
1971	(Italy) Annibale De Faveri		
1972	(Italy) Graziano Mella		
1973	(Italy) Ermenegildo Da Re		
1974	(Italy) Ermenegildo Da Re		
1975	(Italy) Mario Gualdi		
1976	(Italy) Mario Gualdi		
1977	(Italy) Claudio Corti		
1978	(Italy) Walter Clivati		
1979	(Italy) Alessandro Paganessi		
1980	(Italy) Giovanni Moro		
1981	(Italy) Walter Delle Case		
1982	(Italy) Massimo Ghirotto		
1983	(Italy) Tullio Cortinovis		
1984	(Italy) Luca Rota		
1985	(Italy) Luigi Botteon		
1986	(Italy) Maurizio Fondriest		
1987	(Italy) Denis Mocellin		
1988	(Italy) Stefano Dalla Pozza		
1989	(Italy) Ivan Gotti		
1990	(Italy) Davide Perona		
1991	(Italy) Cristian Zanolini		
1992	Interrupted due to bad weather conditions.		
1993	(Austria) Peter Luttenberger		
1994	(Italy) Dario Frigo		
1995	(Italy) Massimo Apollonio		
1996	(Italy) Stefano Finesso		
1997	(Italy) Marino Beggi		
1998	(Italy) Bruno Minniti		
1999	(Luxembourg) Kim Kirchen		
2000	(Italy) Lorenzo Bernucci		
2001	(Russia) Denis Bondarenko		
2002	(Italy) Davide Bragazzi		
2003	(Italy) Daniele Masolino		
2004	(Italy) Antonio Quadranti	(Italy) Daniele Pontoni	(Uzbekistan) Denis Shkarpeta
2005	(Italy) Devid Garbelli	(Italy) Morris Possoni	(Italy) Maurizio Biondo
2006	(Italy) Cristiano Fumagalli	(Italy) Fabio Casotto	(Italy) Alessandro Bazzana
2007	(Italy) Mauro Finetto	(Italy) Angelo Pagani	(Italy) Edoardo Girardi
2008	(Italy) Enrico Battaglin	(Italy) Gianluca Brambilla	(Italy) Enrico Zen
2009	(Italy) Gianluca Brambilla	(Italy) Enrico Battaglin	(Italy) Cristiano Monguzzi
2010	(Italy) Gabriele Pizzaballa	(Italy) Fabio Aru	(Italy) Andrea Pasqualon
2011	(Italy) Gianfranco Zilioli	(Italy) Enrico Battaglin	(Italy) Fabio Aru
2012	(Italy) Andrea Fedi	(Italy) Davide Villella	(Italy) Francesco Manuel Bongiorno
2013	(Italy) Luca Benedetti	(Italy) Davide Villella	(Italy) Simone Andreetta
2014	(Italy) Andrea Toniatti	(Italy) Davide Orrico	(Italy) Paolo Totò
2015	(Italy) Giulio Ciccone	(Italy) Gianni Moscon	(Italy) Andrea Vendrame
2016	(Italy) Fausto Masnada	(Moldova) Cristian Raileanu	(Belarus) Aleksandr Riabushenko
2017	(Italy) Matteo Fabbro	(Belarus) Aleksandr Riabushenko	(Italy) Andrea Toniatti
2018	(Italy) Samuele Battistella	(Italy) Filippo Rocchetti	(Italy) Davide Casarotto
2019	(Italy) Giovanni Aleotti	(Colombia) Einer Rubio	(Italy) Luca Rastelli
2020	(Italy) Daniel Smarzaro	(Slovenia) Tilen Finkšt	(Italy) Davide Bais
2021	(Italy) Riccardo Lucca	(Italy) Davide Botta	(Italy) Andrea Piccolo
2022	(Italy) Giacomo Villa	(Italy) Francesco Busatto	(Italy) Martin Nessler
2023	(Republic of Ireland) Archie Ryan	(Netherlands) Tijmen Graat	(Netherlands) Darren van Bekkum
2024	(Norway) Jørgen Nordhagen	(Netherlands) Menno Huising	(Italy) Alessandro Borgo
2025	(Italy) Lorenzo Finn	(Italy) Federico Iacomoni	(United Kingdom) Elliot Rowe
