= 2018 GP Laguna =

- 2018 UCI Europe Tour

Race details
- Dates: 18 February 2018
- Stages: 1
- Distance: 161 km (100.0 mi)
- Winning time: 4h 05' 32"

Results
	Winner	Paolo Totò (ITA)	(Sangemini–MG.K Vis Vega)
	Second	Lukas Schlemmer (AUT)	(Team Felbermayr–Simplon Wels)
	Third	Andrea Toniatti (ITA)	(Team Colpack)

The 2018 Grand Prix Laguna Porec was the 4th edition of the GP Laguna road cycling one day race. It was part of UCI Europe Tour in category 1.2.

== Teams ==
Twenty teams were invited to take part in the race. All of them were UCI Continental and club teams.

UCI Continental teams

- Kőbánya Cycling Team
- Adria Mobil
- Team Felbermayr–Simplon Wels
- Hrinkow Advarics Cycleang
- MsTina–Focus
- Ljubljana Gusto Xaurum
- Meridiana–Kamen
- My Bike–Stevens
- Tirol Cycling Team
- Sangemini–MG.K Vis Vega
- Pannon Cycling Team
- WSA–Pushbikers

Club teams

- Team Colpack
- Meblo Jogi Pro-Concrete
- KK Bled
- Team Cerveló
- BK Roda
- KK Kranj
- Veloclub Ratisbona
- Wohnbefinden Graz ARBÖ

== Result ==
Result
Rank	Rider	Team	Time
1	Paolo Totò (ITA)	Sangemini–MG.K Vis Vega	4h 05' 32"
2	Lukas Schlemmer (AUT)	Team Felbermayr–Simplon Wels	+ 13"
3	Andrea Toniatti (ITA)	Team Colpack	+ 13"
4	Jaka Primožič (SLO)	KK Kranj	+ 13"
5	Tadej Pogačar (SLO)	Ljubljana Gusto Xaurum	+ 13"
6	Jure Golčer (SLO)	Adria Mobil	+ 13"
7	Markus Eibegger (AUT)	Team Felbermayr–Simplon Wels	+ 13"
8	Filippo Fortin (ITA)	Team Felbermayr–Simplon Wels	+ 1'13"
9	Enrico Zanoncello (ITA)	Team Colpack	+ 1'13"
10	Dušan Rajović (SRB)	Adria Mobil	+ 1'13"
