= Trofeo Gianfranco Bianchin =

Race details
- Date: August
- Region: Veneto
- Discipline: Road race
- Competition: UCI Europe Tour
- Type: Single day race

History
- First edition: 1970
- Editions: 50 (as of 2019)
- First winner: Pietro Poloni (ITA)
- Most wins: Robert Vrečer (SLO) (2 wins)
- Most recent: Francesco Di Felice (ITA)

The Trofeo Gianfranco Bianchin is a one-day cycling race held annually in Italy. It was part of UCI Europe Tour in category 1.2 from 2005 to 2012.

The race was created in honor of Italian professional cyclist Gianfranco Bianchin who died at the age of 23 in 1970.

== Winners ==
Year	Winner	Second	Third
1970	(Italy) Pietro Poloni		
1971	(Italy) Gino Chies		
1972	(Italy) Nereo Bazzan		
1973	(Italy) Giampaolo Flamini		
1974	(Italy) Ruggero Gialdini		
1975	(Italy) Giuseppe Martinelli		
1976	(Italy) Ermenegildo Da Re		
1977	(Italy) Fiorenzo Favero		
1978	(Italy) Claudio Pettinà		
1979	(Italy) Giuseppe Petito		
1980	(Italy) Giovanni Moro		
1981	(Italy) Claudio Argentin		
1982	(Italy) Ezio Moroni		
1983	(Italy) Mario Condolo		
1984	(Italy) Enrico Pezzetti		
1985	(Italy) Luigi Furlan		
1986	(Italy) Giorgio Furlan		
1987	(Italy) Carlo Finco		
1988	(Italy) Desiderio Volaterl	(Italy) Gianluca Zanini	(Italy) Valentino Guerra
1989	(Italy) Marco Masetti	(Italy) Mirko Bruschi	(Italy) Carlo Benigni
1990	(Italy) Stefano Guerrini	(Italy) Valentino Guerra	(Italy) Wladimir Belli
1991	(Italy) Giuseppe Guerini	(Italy) Alessandro Bertolini	(Italy) Carlo Colbacchini
1992	(Italy) Alessandro Bertolini	(Italy) Gian Matteo Fagnini	(Italy) Mauro Bettin
1993	(Italy) Stefano Checchin	(Italy) Alessandro Bertolini	(Italy) Mauro Bettin
1994	(Italy) Gianluca Pianegonda	(Austria) Peter Luttenberger	(Italy) Andrea Dolci
1995	(Italy) Stefano Faustini	(Italy) Giuliano Figueras	(Italy) Andrea Zatti
1996	(Italy) Emanuele Lupi	(Italy) Gianluca Tonetti	(Italy) Stefano Finesso
1997	(Italy) Giuliano Figueras	(Italy) Salvatore Commesso	(Italy) Roberto Ferrario
1998	(Italy) Massimo Cigana	(Italy) Ivan Basso	(Italy) Fabio Marchesin
1999	(Italy) Leonardo Giordani	(Italy) Paolo Tiralongo	(Italy) Maurizio Vandelli
2000	(Italy) Giampaolo Caruso	(Ukraine) Yaroslav Popovych	(Italy) Luca Barattero
2001	(Italy) Luca Barattero	(Russia) Alexandr Kolobnev	(Italy) Alessandro Bertuola
2002	(Italy) Luca Solari	(Russia) Alexander Arekeev	(Italy) Emanuele Sella
2003	(Italy) Giovanni Visconti	(Ukraine) Roman Radchenko	(Italy) Alessandro Ballan
2004	(Australia) Paul Crake	(Italy) Mauro Da Dalto	(Italy) Davide Viganò
2005	(Italy) Matteo Priamo	(Slovenia) Matic Strgar	(Russia) Alexander Efimkin
2006	(Slovenia) Matic Strgar	(Slovenia) Jure Kocjan	(Slovenia) David Tratnik
2007	(Italy) Americo Novembrini	(Colombia) Julián Darío Atehortúa	(Italy) Alessandro Bisolti
2008	(Slovenia) Robert Vrečer	(Ukraine) Anatoliy Kashtan	(Slovenia) Matic Strgar
2009	(Ecuador) José Bone León	(Italy) Gianluca Brambilla	(Ukraine) Igor Dementev
2010	(Slovenia) Robert Vrečer	(Italy) Fabio Aru	(Italy) Pierre Paolo Penasa
2011	(Italy) Moreno Moser	(Italy) Patrick Facchini	(Italy) Vincenzo Ianniello
2012	(Italy) Kristian Sbaragli	(Italy) Pietro Tedesco	(Slovenia) Luka Mezgec
2013	(Italy) Andrea Toniatti	(Italy) Gianluca Leonardi	(Italy) Daniele Cavasin
2014	(Italy) Davide Gomirato	(Italy) Daniele Cavasin	(Italy) Paolo Totò
2015	(Italy) Rino Gasparrini	(Italy) Marco Maronese	(Albania) Xhuliano Kamberaj
2016	(Italy) Michael Bresciani	(Italy) Gianluca Milani	(Russia) Stepan Kurianov
2017	(Italy) Luca Mozzato	(Italy) Nicolò Rocchi	(Italy) Francesco Romano
2018	(Slovenia) Tadej Pogačar	(Italy) Andrea Bagioli	(France) Clément Champoussin
2019	(Italy) Francesco Di Felice	(France) Anthony Jullien	(Italy) Martin Marcellusi
