= Mauro Finetto =

Italian racing cyclist

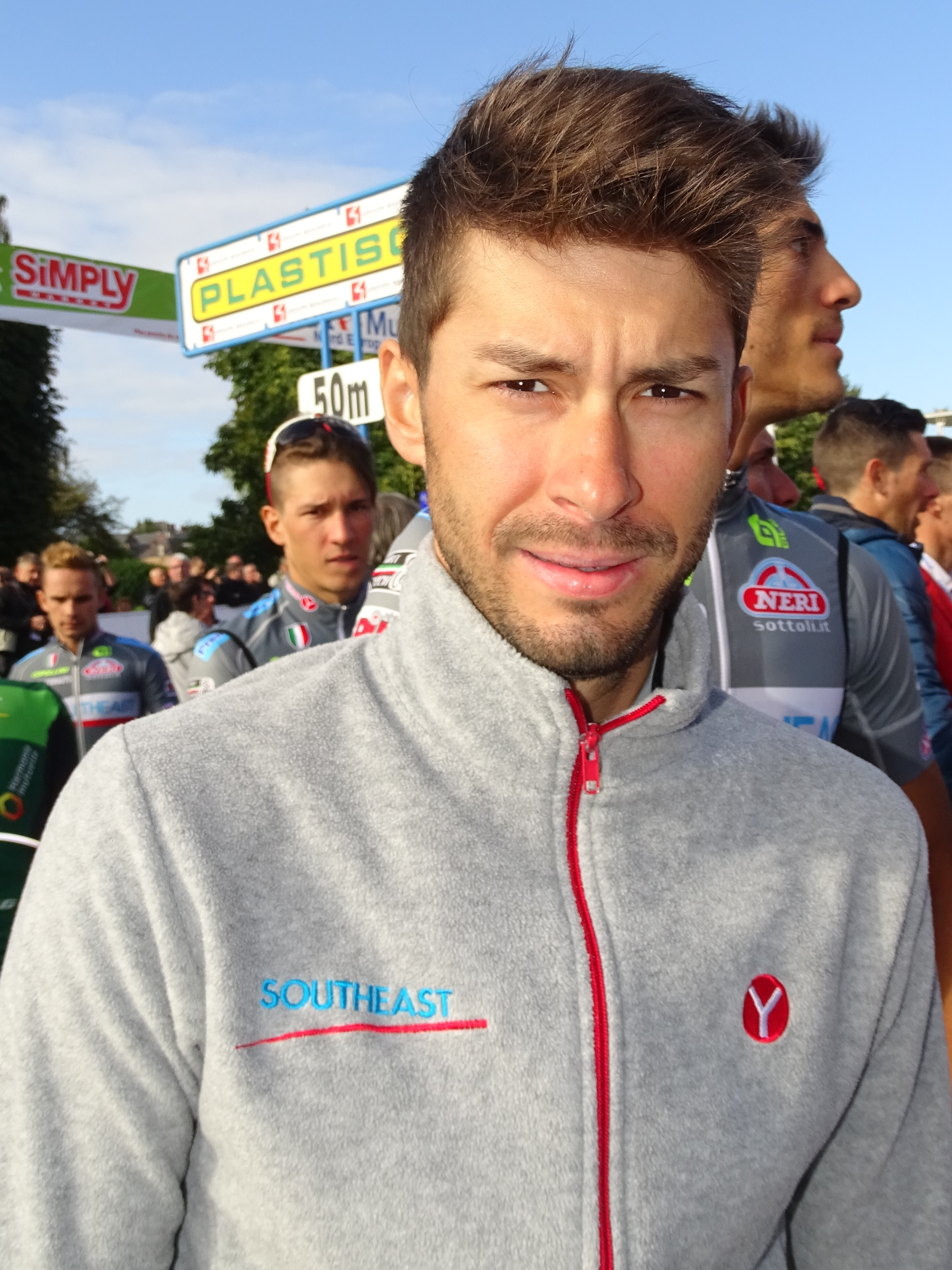

Personal information
- Full name: Mauro Finetto
- Born: 10 May 1985 (age 41) Tregnago, Italy
- Height: 1.75 m (5 ft 9 in)
- Weight: 62 kg (137 lb; 9.8 st)

Cycling career
- Sport: Cycling
- Current team: Retired
- Discipline: Road
- Role: Rider
- Rider type: Classics rider; Puncheur

Amateur teams
- 2005: Egidio–Unidelta
- 2006–2007: Team Filmop
- 2012: KM Bottecchia

Professional teams
- 2008–2009: CSF Group–Navigare
- 2010–2011: Liquigas–Doimo
- 2013–2015: Vini Fantini–Selle Italia
- 2016: Unieuro–Wilier
- 2017–2021: Delko–Marseille Provence KTM
- 2022: Maloja Pushbikers

Mauro Finetto (born 10 May 1985) is an Italian former professional cyclist, who competed as a professional from 2008 to 2022. He rode for UCI ProTour team Liquigas–Cannondale in 2011. He sat out the 2012 season professionally, riding for KM Bottecchia, and came back to competition in 2013, signing a contract with Vini Fantini–Selle Italia.

== Major results ==
2002
9th GP Dell'Arno
2003
National Junior Road Championships

2nd Road race
2nd Time trial

3rd Trofeo Buffoni
7th GP Dell'Arno
2004
4th Trofeo Città di Brescia
2006
4th Ruota d'Oro
9th Giro del Canavese
2007
1st Coppa Città di San Daniele
2nd Gran Premio della Liberazione
3rd Overall Giro della Valle d'Aosta
3rd Road race, National Under-23 Road Championships
5th Overall Giro della Toscana
8th Gara Milionaria - Tr. Marini Silvano Cappelli Sp.
9th Giro del Canavese
2008
2nd Trofeo Melinda
3rd Tre Valli Varesine
3rd Coppa Placci
4th Coppa Sabatini
5th Memorial Cimurri
6th Giro di Lombardia
8th Giro del Lazio
9th Giro della Romagna
2009
1st Hel van het Mergelland
5th Giro del Friuli
6th Overall Tour of Turkey

1st Stages 1 & 6

7th Coppa Bernocchi
10th Overall Three Days of De Panne
2010
1st Stage 1b (TTT) Settimana Internazionale di Coppi e Bartali
5th Giro del Piemonte
6th GP Miguel Induráin
6th Klasika Primavera
10th Tre Valli Varesine
2011
3rd GP Industria & Artigianato di Larciano
8th Coppa Bernocchi
9th Gran Premio dell'Insubria-Lugano
9th Gran Premio di Lugano
2013
5th Trofeo Matteotti
5th Coppa Sabatini
7th Milano–Torino
7th Giro dell'Emilia
8th Gran Premio della Costa Etruschi
9th Overall Settimana Ciclistica Lombarda
2014
1st Overall Tour du Limousin

1st Stage 3

1st Gran Premio di Lugano
2nd Gran Premio della Costa Etruschi
2nd Coppa Sabatini
3rd Volta Limburg Classic
6th Tre Valli Varesine
7th Overall Three Days of De Panne
8th Gran Premio Nobili Rubinetterie
9th Gran Premio Città di Camaiore
9th Gran Premio Industria e Commercio di Prato
10th Roma Maxima
10th Milano–Torino
2015
1st Overall Cycling Tour of Sibiu

1st Points classification
1st Mountains classification
1st Stage 2

2nd Coppa Bernocchi
3rd Coppa Sabatini
4th Overall Tour of Slovenia

1st Mountains classification

8th Giro dell'Emilia
2016
1st Overall Okolo Slovenska

1st Stage 2

2nd Overall Settimana Internazionale di Coppi e Bartali

1st Points classification

2nd Tour of Almaty
3rd Giro dell'Appennino
4th Overall Tour du Maroc
8th Overall Istrian Spring Trophy
8th GP Industria & Artigianato di Larciano
9th Trofeo Matteotti
10th Overall Presidential Tour of Turkey
2017
1st Classic Sud-Ardèche
3rd Trofeo Laigueglia
6th Overall Tour du Haut Var
6th Overall Four Days of Dunkirk
7th Grand Prix d'Ouverture La Marseillaise
8th Overall Tour du Limousin
9th Overall Route du Sud
9th Coppa Ugo Agostoni
10th Tour du Jura
2018
5th GP Industria & Artigianato di Larciano
6th Overall Tour du Haut Var
8th Giro della Toscana
9th Overall Tour of Turkey
9th Tro-Bro Léon
10th Overall Tour de Luxembourg

1st Mountains classification

10th Paris–Chauny
2019
1st Stage 5 Settimana Internazionale di Coppi e Bartali
8th Overall Giro di Sicilia
9th Overall Tour of Turkey
2020
7th Trofeo Matteotti
8th Circuito de Getxo
9th Overall Settimana Internazionale di Coppi e Bartali

=== Grand Tour general classification results timeline ===
Grand Tour	2010	2011	2012	2013	2014	2015
Giro d'Italia	—	—	—	—	DNF	57
Tour de France	Did not contest during his career					
Vuelta a España	79	—	—	—	—	—

Legend
—	Did not compete
DNF	Did not finish
