= Simone Petilli =

Italian bicycle racer

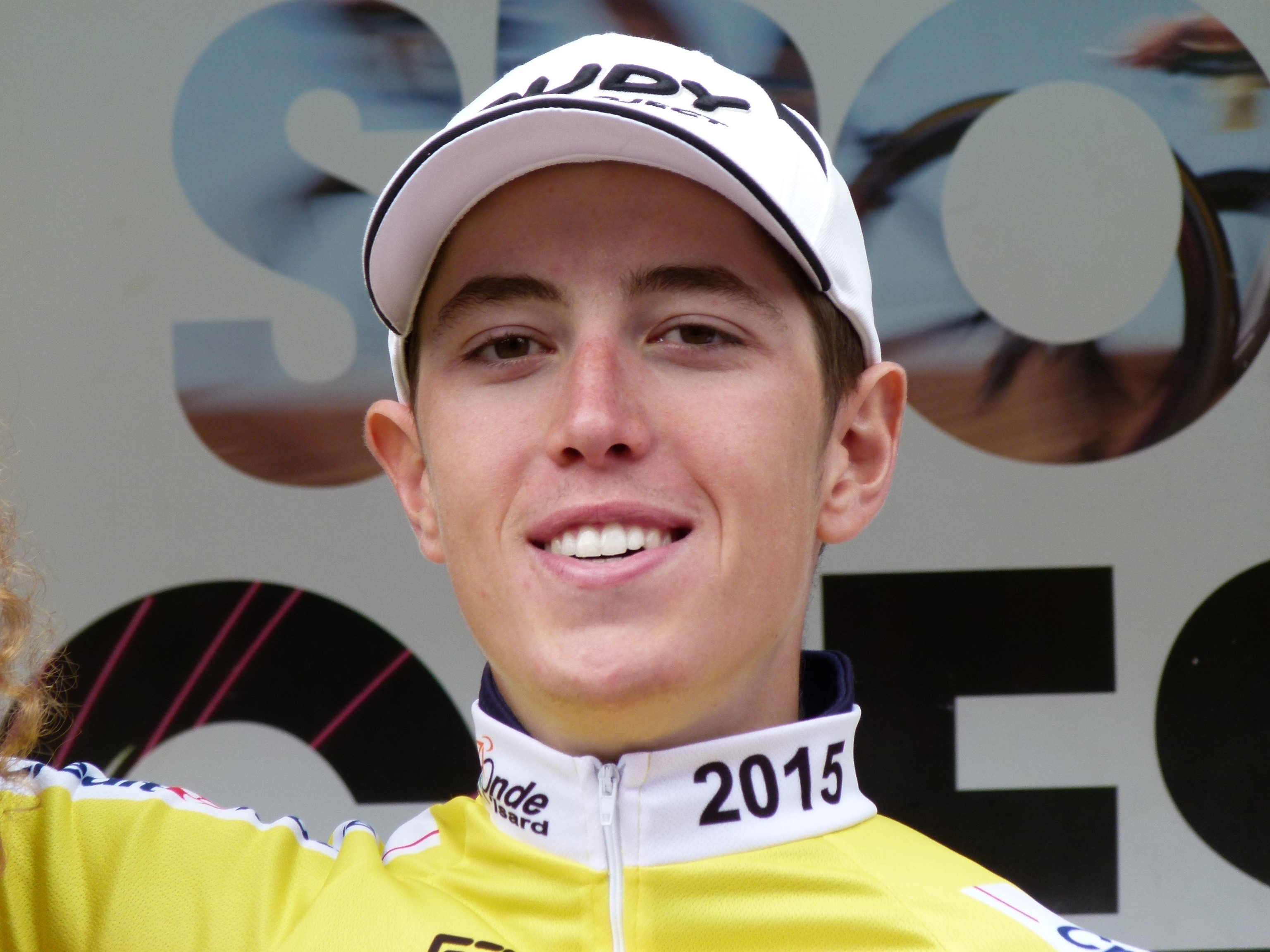
- Petilli in 2015.

Personal information
- Full name: Simone Petilli
- Born: 4 May 1993 (age 33) Bellano, Lecco, Italy
- Height: 1.78 m (5 ft 10 in)
- Weight: 63 kg (139 lb)

Cycling career
- Sport: Cycling
- Current team: Intermarché–Wanty
- Discipline: Road
- Role: Rider
- Rider type: Climbing specialist

Amateur teams
- 2009: G.S.C. Capiaghese
- 2010–2011: Canturino 1902
- 2012–2013: Gallina Colosio S.Inox

Professional teams
- 2014: Area Zero Pro Team
- 2015: Unieuro–Wilier
- 2016–2019: Lampre–Merida
- 2020: Circus–Wanty Gobert
- 2021–: Intermarché–Wanty–Gobert Matériaux

Simone Petilli (born 4 May 1993) is an Italian cyclist, who currently rides for UCI WorldTeam Intermarché–Wanty. Petilli signed a contract to join the Lampre–Merida team for the 2016 season. He was named in the start list for the 2016 Giro d'Italia.

== Major results ==
2010
5th Trofeo Città Di Ivrea
2011
2nd Trofeo San Rocco
3rd Overall Tre Ciclistica Internazionale Bresciana
7th Trofeo Emilio Paganessi
10th GP Dell'Arno
2012
5th Trofeo Franco Balestra
2013
1st Mountains classification, Giro della Valle d'Aosta
4th Trofeo Internazionale Bastianelli
6th Trofeo Banca Popolare di Vicenza
6th Gran Premio Palio del Recioto
9th Giro del Belvedere
2014
1st Young rider classification, Settimana Internazionale Coppi e Bartali
2015
1st Overall Ronde de l'Isard

1st Stage 1

1st Young rider classification, Settimana Internazionale Coppi e Bartali
2nd Trofeo Edil C
3rd Overall Giro della Valle d'Aosta Mont Blanc
3rd GP Laguna
3rd Giro del Medio Brenta
5th Overall Tour de l'Avenir
5th Piccolo Giro di Lombardia
7th Giro dell'Appennino
7th Trofeo Banca Popolare di Vicenza
9th Trofeo Laigueglia
10th Gran Premio della Costa Etruschi
2016
7th Giro dell'Appennino
10th GP Industria & Artigianato di Larciano
2017
10th Gran Premio della Costa Etruschi
2018
9th Overall Adriatica Ionica Race
2019
10th Overall Giro di Sicilia
2022
9th Strade Bianche
2023
8th Overall Giro di Sicilia

=== Grand Tour general classification results timeline ===
Grand Tour	2016	2017	2018	2019	2020	2021	2022	2023
Giro d'Italia	77	26	—	—	—	44	—	DNF
Tour de France	—	—	—	—	—	—	—	—
Vuelta a España	—	—	DNF	—	—	29	—	58

Legend
—	Did not compete
DNF	Did not finish
