= Davide Martinelli =

Italian cyclist (born 1993)

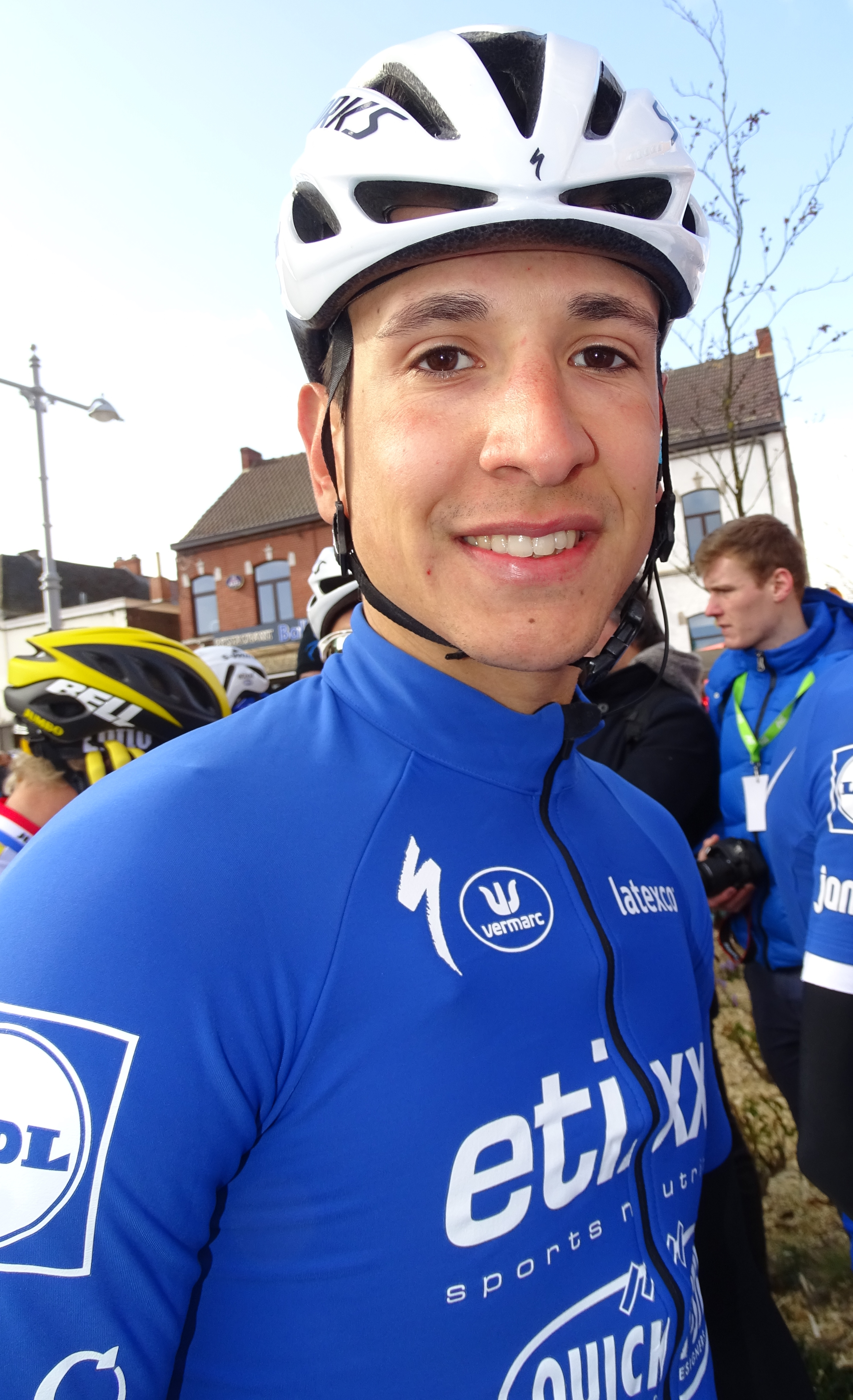
- Martinelli at the 2016 Le Samyn

Personal information
- Full name: Davide Martinelli
- Nickname: Marti
- Born: May 31, 1993 (age 33) Brescia, Italy
- Height: 186 cm (6 ft 1 in)
- Weight: 71 kg (157 lb)

Cycling career
- Sport: Cycling
- Current team: XDS Astana Team
- Discipline: Road
- Role: Rider
- Rider type: Rouleur

Amateur teams
- 2012: Team Simaf Carrier Wega Truck Italia Valdarno
- 2013: Team Food Italia Mg K Vis Norda
- 2014–2015: Team Colpack

Professional teams
- → 2012: Team Sky (stagiaire)
- → 2014: Team Sky (stagiaire)
- 2016–2019: Etixx–Quick-Step
- 2020–: Astana
Medal record
Men's road bicycle racing
Representing Italy
European Road Championships
Bronze medal – third place	2015 Tartu	Under-23 road race
Bronze medal – third place	2019 Alkmaar	Mixed Team Relay

Davide Martinelli (born 31 May 1993) is an Italian professional road bicycle racer, who currently rides for UCI WorldTeam XDS Astana Team.

== Career ==
Martinelli made his debut in an Etixx–Quick-Step jersey in the 2016 Tour Down Under. On 24 February 2016, he scored a surprise first professional win in stage 2 of the Tour La Provence. He was the lead out man for Fernando Gaviria in the finale, but a crash split the peloton which allowed a chance for him to cross the line ahead of Gaviria. His maiden UCI World Tour win came on 12 July 2016 in the first stage of the Tour de Pologne. He attacked within the final kilometre, taking the victory ahead of Gaviria.

He was named in the start list for the 2017 Giro d'Italia.

== Personal life ==
Davide Martinelli is the son of former Italian cyclist and XDS Astana Team director sportif Giuseppe Martinelli.

== Major results ==
2011
1st Individual pursuit, National Track Championships
1st Time trial, National Junior Road Championships
1st Trofeo Emilio Paganessi
1st Memorial Davide Fardelli Juniors
3rd GP dell'Arno
3rd Trofeo Buffoni
6th Time trial, UEC European Junior Road Championships
7th Overall GP Denmark
2012
1st Coppa del Grano
2nd Time trial, National Under-23 Road Championships
3rd Circuito del Porto
3rd Piccolo Giro dell'Emilia
4th La Popolarissima
2013
1st Time trial, National Under-23 Road Championships
1st Coppa 1.º de Maggio
2nd G.P. Sportivi di Podenzano
Coppa Mobilio Ponsacco

2nd Time trial
2nd Road race

2nd Memorial Lorenzo Mola
3rd Circuito del Porto
3rd Giro della Valcavasia
3rd GP Mocambo Bar
5th GP Sovizzo
6th Time trial, Mediterranean Games
9th Chrono Champenois
2014
1st Time trial, National Under-23 Road Championships
1st Prova-Bracciale del Cronoman
1st Bracciale del Cronoman
1st Trofeo Mario Zanchi
1st Points classification Tour de l'Avenir
2nd Time trial, UEC European Under-23 Road Championships
2nd Milano–Busseto
2nd Bracciale del Cronoman
3rd Memorial Angelo Fumagalli
3rd Firenze–Mare
6th Circuito del Porto
6th Medaglia d'Oro Domenico e Anita Colleoni
7th Chrono Champenois
9th Trofeo Edil C
2015
1st Time trial, National Under-23 Road Championships
1st Fucecchio (La Torre)
UEC European Under-23 Road Championships

3rd Road race
7th Time trial

3rd Gran Premio Industrie del Marmo
3rd Chrono Champenois
5th Coppa della Pace
6th GP Laguna
6th Paris–Roubaix Espoirs
8th Gran Premio della Costa Etruschi
2016
1st Stage 1 Tour de Pologne
1st Stage 2 Tour La Provence
4th GP Briek Schotte
5th Overall Ster ZLM Toer
7th Down Under Classic
2017
10th Handzame Classic
10th Brussels Cycling Classic
10th Grote Prijs Jef Scherens
2018
1st Stage 1 (TTT) Adriatica Ionica Race
2019
3rd Team relay, UEC European Road Championships
9th Heistse Pijl

=== Grand Tour general classification results timeline ===
Grand Tour	2017
Giro d'Italia	153
Tour de France	—
Vuelta a España	—

Legend
—	Did not compete
DNF	Did not finish
