= 2015 Settimana Internazionale di Coppi e Bartali =

2015 UCI Europe Tour

Race details
- Dates: 26–29 March 2015
- Stages: 5
- Distance: 580.3 km (360.6 mi)
- Winning time: 14h 31' 42"

Results
Jersey awarded to the overall winner	Winner	Louis Meintjes (RSA)	(MTN–Qhubeka)
	Second	Ben Swift (GBR)	(Team Sky)
	Third	Matija Kvasina (CRO)	(Team Felbermayr–Simplon Wels)
Jersey awarded to the points classification winner	Points	Ben Swift (GBR)	(Team Sky)
Jersey awarded to the mountains classification winner	Mountains	Primož Roglič (SLO)	(Adria Mobil)
Jersey awarded to the young rider classification winner	Young rider	Simone Petilli (ITA)	(Unieuro–Wilier)
	Team	Team Sky	

The 2015 Settimana Internazionale di Coppi e Bartali was the 30th edition of the Settimana Internazionale di Coppi e Bartali cycling stage race. It started on 26 March in Gatteo and ended on 29 March in Roccapelago. The race consisted of four stages. As in the 2014 edition, the first stage was divided into two half-stages, with the second half of the first stage being a team time trial.

The race was won by South African rider Louis Meintjes (MTN–Qhubeka), who claimed the leader's jersey with his win on the final stage. Meintjes beat Ben Swift (Team Sky) in the general classification by two seconds. The podium was completed by Croatian rider Matija Kvasina, of Team Felbermayr–Simplon Wels. Swift won the second stage and the points classification, Slovenian rider Primož Roglič of Adria Mobil won the mountains classification and Unieuro–Wilier's Simone Petilli from Italy, finished first in the young rider classification for the second year in a row. The team classification was won by Team Sky.

== Race overview ==
The 2015 race had four days of racing. The first of these was a split stage, with a road stage followed by a team time trial the same day. The following three days each had one stage, with the final stage a hill-top finish.

Stage	Date	Course	Distance	Type	Winner
1a	26 March	Gatteo to Gatteo	101.8 km (63.3 mi)	Hilly stage	Manuel Belletti (ITA)
1b	26 March	Gatteo a Mare to Gatteo	13.3 km (8.3 mi)	Team time trial	CCC–Sprandi–Polkowice A
2	27 March	Cesenatico to Sogliano al Rubicone	153.8 km (95.6 mi)	Medium-mountain stage	Ben Swift (GBR)
3	28 March	Calderara di Reno to Crevalcore	170.1 km (105.7 mi)	Flat stage	Francesco Chicchi (ITA)
4	29 March	Pavullo to Roccapelago	141.3 km (87.8 mi)	Mountain stage	Louis Meintjes (RSA)
Total		580.3 km (360.6 mi)			

== Teams ==
The start list includes 25 teams (1 UCI WorldTeam, 10 Professional Continental Teams, 13 Continental Teams), and an Italian national team.

WorldTeams

- Team Sky

Professional Continental teams

- Bardiani–CSF
- Southeast Pro Cycling
- Nippo–Vini Fantini
- RusVelo
- MTN–Qhubeka
- Topsport Vlaanderen–Baloise
- Colombia
- CCC–Sprandi–Polkowice
- Drapac Professional Cycling
- Androni Giocattoli

Continental teams

- Amore & Vita–Selle SMP
- Team Dukla Praha
- Team Idea 2010 ASD
- D'Amico–Bottecchia
- Meridiana–Kamen
- Adria Mobil
- MG.K Vis–Vega
- Team Felbermayr–Simplon Wels
- GM Cycling Team
- Roth–Škoda
- Team TreFor–Blue Water
- Unieuro–Wilier
- Movistar Team América

National teams

- Italy

== Stages ==
=== Stage 1a ===
26 March 2015 – Gatteo to Gatteo, 101.8 km (63.3 mi)

Result of stage 1a
Rank	Rider	Team	Time
1	Manuel Belletti (ITA)	Southeast Pro Cycling	2h 20' 13"
2	Grega Bole (SLO)	CCC–Sprandi–Polkowice	+ 0"
3	Patrick Clausen (DEN)	Team TreFor–Blue Water	+ 0"
4	Asbjørn Kragh Andersen (DEN)	Team TreFor–Blue Water	+ 0"
5	Ben Swift (GBR)	Team Sky	+ 0"
6	Edwin Ávila (COL)	Colombia	+ 0"
7	Francesco Gavazzi (ITA)	Southeast Pro Cycling	+ 0"
8	Davide Viganò (ITA)	Team Idea 2010 ASD	+ 0"
9	Daniele Colli (ITA)	Nippo–Vini Fantini	+ 0"
10	Simone Ponzi (ITA)	Southeast Pro Cycling	+ 0"

General classification after stage 1a
Rank	Rider	Team	Time
1	Manuel Belletti (ITA)	Southeast Pro Cycling	2h 20' 07"
2	Grega Bole (SLO)	CCC–Sprandi–Polkowice	+ 2"
3	Patrick Clausen (DEN)	Team TreFor–Blue Water	+ 4"
4	Asbjørn Kragh Andersen (DEN)	Team TreFor–Blue Water	+ 6"
5	Ben Swift (GBR)	Team Sky	+ 6"
6	Edwin Ávila (COL)	Colombia	+ 6"
7	Francesco Gavazzi (ITA)	Southeast Pro Cycling	+ 6"
8	Davide Viganò (ITA)	Team Idea 2010 ASD	+ 6"
9	Daniele Colli (ITA)	Nippo–Vini Fantini	+ 6"
10	Simone Ponzi (ITA)	Southeast Pro Cycling	+ 6"

=== Stage 1b ===
26 March 2015 – Gatteo a Mare to Gatteo, 13.3 km (8.3 mi), team time trial (TTT)

Stage 1b result
Rank	Team	Time
1	CCC–Sprandi–Polkowice A	14' 49"
2	Team Sky A	+ 1"
3	MTN–Qhubeka A	+ 4"
4	Androni Giocattoli A	+ 8"
5	Colombia A	+ 9"
6	RusVelo A	+ 11"
7	Team TreFor–Blue Water A	+ 16"
8	Italy (national team) A	+ 17"
9	Team Idea 2010 ASD A	+ 19"
10	CCC–Sprandi–Polkowice B	+ 20"

General classification after stage 1b
Rank	Rider	Team	Time
1	Davide Rebellin (ITA)	CCC–Sprandi–Polkowice	2h 35' 02"
2	Tomasz Kiendyś (POL)	CCC–Sprandi–Polkowice	+ 0"
3	Jarosław Marycz (POL)	CCC–Sprandi–Polkowice	+ 0"
4	Adrian Kurek (POL)	CCC–Sprandi–Polkowice	+ 0"
5	Ben Swift (GBR)	Team Sky	+ 1"
6	Philip Deignan (IRE)	Team Sky	+ 1"
7	Kanstantsin Sivtsov (BLR)	Team Sky	+ 1"
8	Louis Meintjes (RSA)	MTN–Qhubeka	+ 4"
9	Jacques Janse van Rensburg (RSA)	MTN–Qhubeka	+ 4"
10	Steve Cummings (GBR)	MTN–Qhubeka	+ 4"

=== Stage 2 ===
27 March 2015 – Cesenatico to Sogliano al Rubicone, 153.8 km (95.6 mi)

Stage 2 result
Rank	Rider	Team	Time
1	Ben Swift (GBR)	Team Sky	4h 28' 10"
2	Matija Kvasina (CRO)	Team Felbermayr–Simplon Wels	+ 16"
3	Francesco Manuel Bongiorno (ITA)	Bardiani–CSF	+ 21"
4	Valerio Agnoli (ITA)	Italy (national team)	+ 57"
5	Carlos Quintero (COL)	Colombia	+ 57"
6	Francesco Gavazzi (ITA)	Southeast Pro Cycling	+ 1' 01"
7	Søren Kragh Andersen (DEN)	Team TreFor–Blue Water	+ 1' 05"
8	Kanstantsin Sivtsov (BLR)	Team Sky	+ 1' 07"
9	Louis Meintjes (RSA)	MTN–Qhubeka	+ 1' 07"
10	Franco Pellizotti (ITA)	Androni Giocattoli	+ 1' 10"

General classification after stage 2
Rank	Rider	Team	Time
1	Ben Swift (GBR)	Team Sky	7h 03' 03"
2	Matija Kvasina (CRO)	Team Felbermayr–Simplon Wels	+ 41"
3	Francesco Manuel Bongiorno (ITA)	Bardiani–CSF	+ 54"
4	Carlos Quintero (COL)	Colombia	+ 1' 15"
5	Kanstantsin Sivtsov (BLR)	Team Sky	+ 1' 17"
6	Louis Meintjes (RSA)	MTN–Qhubeka	+ 1' 20"
7	Valerio Agnoli (ITA)	Italy (national team)	+ 1' 23"
8	Franco Pellizotti (ITA)	Androni Giocattoli	+ 1' 27"
9	Søren Kragh Andersen (DEN)	Team TreFor–Blue Water	+ 1' 30"
10	Francesco Gavazzi (ITA)	Southeast Pro Cycling	+ 1' 35"

=== Stage 3 ===
28 March 2015 – Calderara di Reno to Crevalcore, 170.1 km (105.7 mi)

Stage 3 result
Rank	Rider	Team	Time
1	Francesco Chicchi (ITA)	Androni Giocattoli	3h 33' 05"
2	Manuel Belletti (ITA)	Southeast Pro Cycling	+ 0"
3	Daniele Colli (ITA)	Nippo–Vini Fantini	+ 0"
4	Nicola Ruffoni (ITA)	Bardiani–CSF	+ 0"
5	Bartłomiej Matysiak (POL)	CCC–Sprandi–Polkowice	+ 0"
6	Rino Gasparrini (ITA)	Unieuro–Wilier	+ 0"
7	Andrea Pasqualon (ITA)	Roth–Škoda	+ 0"
8	Asbjørn Kragh Andersen (DEN)	Team TreFor–Blue Water	+ 0"
9	Filippo Fortin (ITA)	GM Cycling Team	+ 0"
10	Sonny Colbrelli (ITA)	Bardiani–CSF	+ 0"

General classification after stage 3
Rank	Rider	Team	Time
1	Ben Swift (GBR)	Team Sky	10h 36' 08"
2	Matija Kvasina (CRO)	Team Felbermayr–Simplon Wels	+ 41"
3	Francesco Manuel Bongiorno (ITA)	Bardiani–CSF	+ 54"
4	Carlos Quintero (COL)	Colombia	+ 1' 15"
5	Kanstantsin Sivtsov (BLR)	Team Sky	+ 1' 17"
6	Louis Meintjes (RSA)	MTN–Qhubeka	+ 1' 20"
7	Valerio Agnoli (ITA)	Italy (national team)	+ 1' 23"
8	Franco Pellizotti (ITA)	Androni Giocattoli	+ 1' 27"
9	Søren Kragh Andersen (DEN)	Team TreFor–Blue Water	+ 1' 30"
10	Francesco Gavazzi (ITA)	Southeast Pro Cycling	+ 1' 35"

=== Stage 4 ===
29 March 2015 – Pavullo to Roccapelago, 141.3 km (87.8 mi)

Stage 4 result
Rank	Rider	Team	Time
1	Louis Meintjes (RSA)	MTN–Qhubeka	3h 54' 24"
2	Damiano Cunego (ITA)	Nippo–Vini Fantini	+ 1' 12"
3	Davide Rebellin (ITA)	CCC–Sprandi–Polkowice	+ 1' 12"
4	Ben Swift (GBR)	Team Sky	+ 1' 12"
5	Matija Kvasina (CRO)	Team Felbermayr–Simplon Wels	+ 1' 15"
6	Sergio Henao (COL)	Team Sky	+ 1' 17"
7	Francesco Manuel Bongiorno (ITA)	Bardiani–CSF	+ 1' 17"
8	Freddy Montaña (COL)	Movistar Team América	+ 1' 23"
9	Franco Pellizotti (ITA)	Androni Giocattoli	+ 2' 22"
10	Francesco Reda (ITA)	Team Idea 2010 ASD	+ 2' 30"

Final general classification
Rank	Rider	Team	Time
1	Louis Meintjes (RSA)	MTN–Qhubeka	14h 31' 42"
2	Ben Swift (GBR)	Team Sky	+ 2"
3	Matija Kvasina (CRO)	Team Felbermayr–Simplon Wels	+ 46"
4	Francesco Manuel Bongiorno (ITA)	Bardiani–CSF	+ 1' 01"
5	Davide Rebellin (ITA)	CCC–Sprandi–Polkowice	+ 2' 31"
6	Kanstantsin Sivtsov (BLR)	Team Sky	+ 2' 38"
7	Franco Pellizotti (ITA)	Androni Giocattoli	+ 2' 39"
8	Simone Stortoni (ITA)	Androni Giocattoli	+ 3' 12"
9	Valerio Agnoli (ITA)	Italy (national team)	+ 3' 33"
10	Carlos Quintero (COL)	Colombia	+ 3' 35"

== Classifications leadership table ==
Stage	Winner	General classification	Points classification	Mountains classification	Young rider classification	Teams classification
1a	Manuel Belletti	Manuel Belletti	Manuel Belletti	Gianfranco Zilioli	Davide Ballerini	Southeast Pro Cycling
1b	CCC–Sprandi–Polkowice	Davide Rebellin	Manuel Belletti	Gianfranco Zilioli	Ildar Arslanov	CCC–Sprandi–Polkowice
2	Ben Swift	Ben Swift	Ben Swift	Nicola Gaffurini	Søren Kragh Andersen	Team Sky
3	Francesco Chicchi	Ben Swift	Manuel Belletti	Nicola Gaffurini	Søren Kragh Andersen	Team Sky
4	Louis Meintjes	Louis Meintjes	Ben Swift	Primož Roglič	Simone Petilli	Team Sky
Final		Louis Meintjes	Ben Swift	Primož Roglič	Simone Petilli	Team Sky

== Final standings ==
=== General classification ===
Result
Rank	Rider	Team	Time
1	Louis Meintjes (RSA)	MTN–Qhubeka	14h 31' 42"
2	Ben Swift (GBR)	Team Sky	+ 2"
3	Matija Kvasina (CRO)	Team Felbermayr–Simplon Wels	+ 46"
4	Francesco Manuel Bongiorno (ITA)	Bardiani–CSF	+ 1' 01"
5	Davide Rebellin (ITA)	CCC–Sprandi–Polkowice	+ 2' 31"
6	Kanstantsin Sivtsov (BLR)	Team Sky	+ 2' 38"
7	Franco Pellizotti (ITA)	Androni Giocattoli	+ 2' 39"
8	Simone Stortoni (ITA)	Androni Giocattoli	+ 3' 12"
9	Valerio Agnoli (ITA)	Italy (national team)	+ 3' 33"
10	Carlos Quintero (COL)	Colombia	+ 3' 35"

=== Points classification ===
Result
Rank	Rider	Team	Points
1	Ben Swift (GBR)	Team Sky	19
2	Manuel Belletti (ITA)	Southeast Pro Cycling	18
3	Matija Kvasina (CRO)	Team Felbermayr–Simplon Wels	12
4	Louis Meintjes (RSA)	MTN–Qhubeka	10
5	Francesco Manuel Bongiorno (ITA)	Bardiani–CSF	8
6	Damiano Cunego (ITA)	Nippo–Vini Fantini	8
7	Grega Bole (SLO)	CCC–Sprandi–Polkowice	8
8	Davide Rebellin (ITA)	CCC–Sprandi–Polkowice	6
9	Asbjørn Kragh Andersen (DEN)	Team TreFor–Blue Water	6
10	Patrick Clausen (DEN)	Team TreFor–Blue Water	6

=== Mountains classification ===
Result
Rank	Rider	Team	Points
1	Primož Roglič (SLO)	Adria Mobil	21
2	Nicola Gaffurini (ITA)	MG.K Vis–Vega	20
3	Davide Ballerini (ITA)	Unieuro–Wilier	14
4	Gianfranco Zilioli (ITA)	Androni Giocattoli	11
5	Ben Swift (GBR)	Team Sky	7
6	Sergio Henao (COL)	Team Sky	7
7	Louis Meintjes (RSA)	MTN–Qhubeka	6
8	Manuel Belletti (ITA)	Southeast Pro Cycling	5
9	Matthias Krizek (AUT)	Team Felbermayr–Simplon Wels	5
10	Giacomo Berlato (ITA)	Nippo–Vini Fantini	5

=== Young rider classification ===
Result
Rank	Rider	Team	Time
1	Simone Petilli (ITA)	Unieuro–Wilier	14h 37' 15"
2	Domen Novak (SLO)	Adria Mobil	+ 3' 29"
3	Søren Kragh Andersen (DEN)	Team TreFor–Blue Water	+ 8' 27"
4	Gianni Moscon (ITA)	Italy (national team)	+ 14' 39"
5	Felix Großschartner (AUT)	Team Felbermayr–Simplon Wels	+ 14' 40"
6	Ildar Arslanov (RUS)	RusVelo	+ 16' 14"
7	Giulio Ciccone (ITA)	Italy (national team)	+ 19' 08"
8	Diego Ochoa (COL)	Movistar Team América	+ 25' 23"
9	Gregor Mühlberger (AUT)	Team Felbermayr–Simplon Wels	+ 29' 19"
10	Roland Thalmann (SUI)	Roth–Škoda	+ 32' 51"

=== Team classification ===
Result
Rank	Team	Time
1	Team Sky	43h 29' 32"
2	Bardiani–CSF	+ 17' 54"
3	MTN–Qhubeka	+ 22' 39"
4	Androni Giocattoli	+ 23' 56"
5	CCC–Sprandi–Polkowice	+ 26' 20"
6	Nippo–Vini Fantini	+ 27' 46"
7	Italy (national team)	+ 29' 10"
8	Adria Mobil	+ 32' 46"
9	Team Felbermayr–Simplon Wels	+ 33' 21"
10	Colombia	+ 42' 12"
