= Fausto Masnada =

Italian cyclist

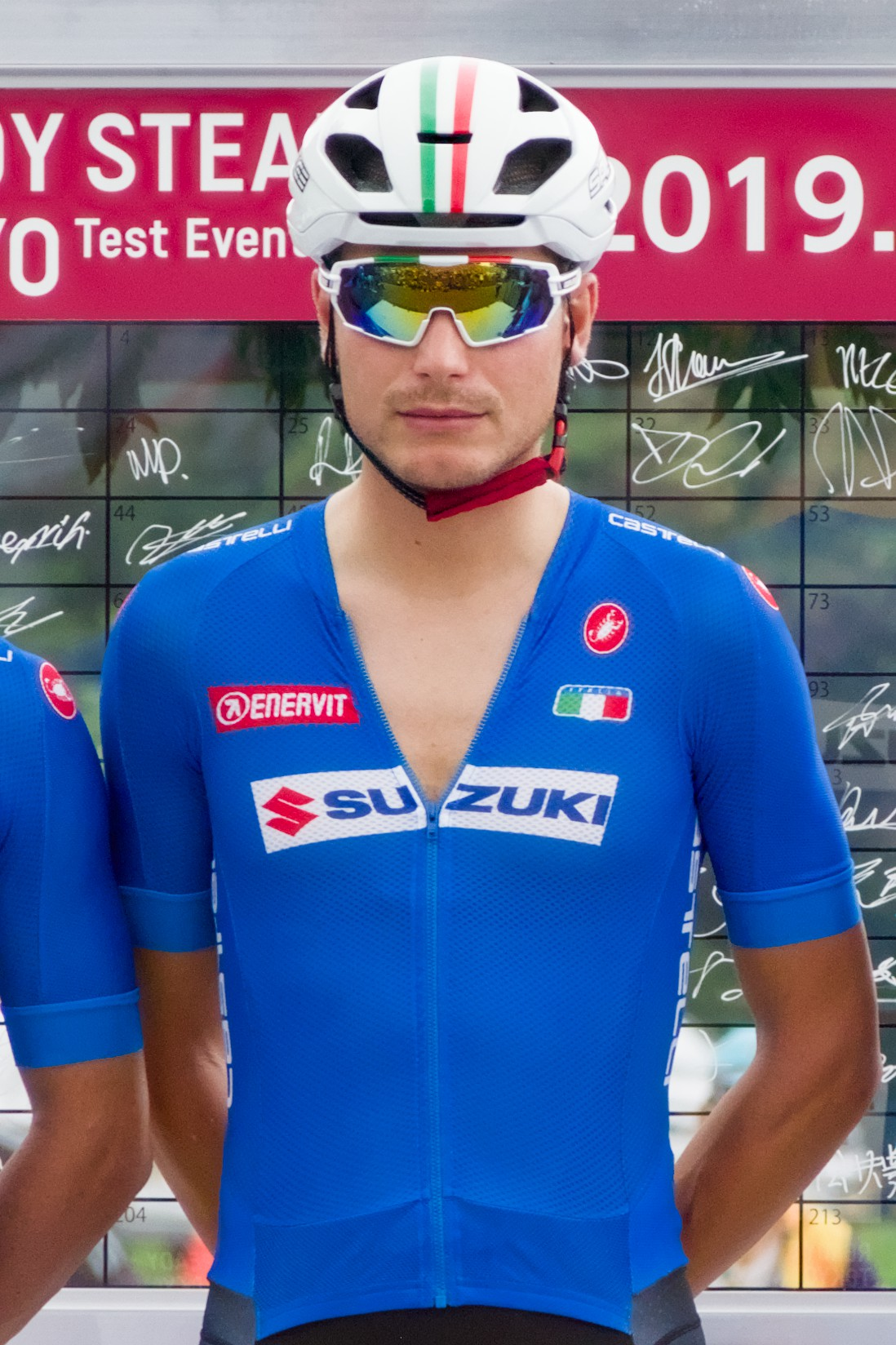
- Masnada in 2019

Personal information
- Born: 6 November 1993 (age 32) Bergamo, Italy
- Height: 1.82 m (6 ft 0 in)
- Weight: 65 kg (143 lb)

Cycling career
- Sport: Cycling
- Current team: MBH Bank CSB Telecom Fort
- Discipline: Road
- Role: Rider
- Rider type: Climber

Amateur team
- 2012–2016: Team Colpack

Professional teams
- 2016: Lampre–Merida (stagiaire)
- 2017–2019: Androni Giocattoli–Sidermec
- 2020: CCC Team
- 2020–2024: Deceuninck–Quick-Step
- 2025: XDS Astana Team
- 2026-: MBH Bank CSB Telecom Fort

Major wins
- Grand Tours Giro d'Italia 1 individual stage (2019) Stage races Tour of Hainan (2018)

Fausto Masnada (born 6 November 1993 in Bergamo) is an Italian cyclist, who currently rides for UCI ProTeam MBH Bank CSB Telecom Fort. He previously rode for UCI WorldTeam XDS Astana Team.

== Career ==
In May 2019, he was named in the start list for the 2019 Giro d'Italia, and went on to win stage 6 of the race.

== Major results ==
2012
6th Overall Giro della Valle d'Aosta
2014
7th Ruota d'Oro
2015
1st Piccolo Giro di Lombardia
2nd Coppa Collecchio
9th Overall Giro del Friuli-Venezia Giulia
2016
1st Giro del Medio Brenta
1st Coppa Città di San Daniele
2017
2nd Overall Tour du Jura
3rd Overall Tour of Turkey
7th Giro dell'Appennino
2018
1st Overall Tour of Hainan

1st Stage 8

1st Mountains classification, Tour of Slovenia
3rd Giro dell'Appennino
6th Overall Settimana Internazionale di Coppi e Bartali
9th Overall Tour de Hongrie
10th Trofeo Laigueglia
2019
1st Stage 6 Giro d'Italia
2nd Giro dell'Appennino
3rd Overall Giro di Sicilia

1st Mountains classification

5th Overall Tour of the Alps

1st Stages 3 & 5

7th Overall Tour of Slovenia
8th Coppa Agostoni
8th Tokyo 2020 Test Event
2020
6th Overall Tirreno–Adriatico
9th Overall Giro d'Italia
9th Overall Tour des Alpes-Maritimes et du Var
2021
2nd Road race, National Road Championships
2nd Giro di Lombardia
3rd Overall Tour de Romandie
3rd Coppa Bernocchi
8th Milano–Torino
10th Overall UAE Tour
2022
2nd Overall Tour of Oman

1st Stage 4

2023
5th Coppa Bernocchi
2024
1st Mountains classification, Four Days of Dunkirk

=== General classification results timeline ===
Grand Tour general classification results
Grand Tour	2018	2019	2020	2021	2022
Giro d'Italia	26	20	9	DNF	—
Tour de France	—	—	—	—	—
Vuelta a España	—	—	—	—	57
Major stage race general classification results
Race	2018	2019	2020	2021	2022
Paris–Nice	—	—	—	—	—
Tirreno–Adriatico	—	—	6	—	—
Volta a Catalunya	—	—	NH	15	DNF
Tour of the Basque Country	—	—	NH	—	—
Tour de Romandie	—	—	NH	3	—
Critérium du Dauphiné	—	—	28	—	—
Tour de Suisse	—	—	NH	—	20

Legend
—	Did not compete
DNF	Did not finish
