= 2015 Coppa Bernocchi =

2015 UCI Europe Tour

Race details
- Dates: 17 September
- Stages: 1
- Distance: 192 km (119.3 mi)
- Winning time: 4h 32' 10"

Results
	Winner	Vincenzo Nibali (ITA)	(Astana)
	Second	Mauro Finetto (ITA)	(Southeast Pro Cycling)
	Third	Matteo Trentin (ITA)	(Italy)

The 2015 Coppa Bernocchi was a one-day cycling semi-classic that took place on 17 September 2015, starting and finishing in Legnano in northern Italy. It was the second leg of the 2015 Trittico Lombardo and the 97th edition of the Coppa Bernocchi. The race was won by Vincenzo Nibali (Astana), who took a solo victory a second ahead of a small group. Mauro Finetto (Southeast Pro Cycling) came second, with Matteo Trentin (riding for the Italian national team) third. Nibali had come second in the Coppa Ugo Agostoni and went on to win the Tre Valli Varesine to win the Trittico Lombardo competition.

== Results ==
Result of classic
Rank	Rider	Team	Time
1	Vincenzo Nibali (ITA)	Astana	4hr 32' 10"
2	Mauro Finetto (ITA)	Southeast Pro Cycling	+ 1"
3	Matteo Trentin (ITA)	Italy	+ 1"
4	Carlos Quintero (COL)	Colombia	+ 1"
5	José Mendes (POR)	Bora–Argon 18	+ 7"
6	Gianfranco Zilioli (ITA)	Androni Giocattoli–Sidermec	+ 21"
7	Giacomo Nizzolo (ITA)	Italy	+ 21"
8	Niccolò Bonifazio (ITA)	Lampre–Merida	+ 21"
9	Eduard-Michael Grosu (ROM)	Nippo–Vini Fantini	+ 21"
10	Sonny Colbrelli (ITA)	Bardiani–CSF	+ 21"
Source: ProCyclingStats
