= Francesco Romano (cyclist) =

Italian cyclist (born 1997)

Personal information
- Full name: Francesco Romano
- Born: 9 July 1997 (age 29) Vittoria, Sicily, Italy

Cycling career
- Sport: Cycling
- Discipline: Road
- Role: Rider

Amateur teams
- 2016–2017: Soligo Amarù Sirio Palazzago
- 2017: UAE Team Emirates (stagiaire)
- 2018: Team Colpack

Professional team
- 2019–2020: Bardiani–CSF

Francesco Romano (born 9 July 1997) is an Italian racing cyclist, who most recently rode for UCI ProTeam Bardiani–CSF–Faizanè. In October 2020, he was named in the startlist for the 2020 Giro d'Italia.

== Major results ==
2014
2nd La Piccola SanRemo
5th Overall Tour of Istria
7th Road race, UEC European Junior Road Championships
8th Overall GP Général Patton
2016
4th Gran Premio Industrie del Marmo
8th Ruota d'Oro
10th Coppa Città di Offida
2017
1st Stage 6 Girobio
5th Gran Premio della Liberazione
5th Trofeo Città di San Vendemiano
6th Trofeo Piva
9th Giro del Belvedere
10th Overall Toscana-Terra di Ciclismo
2018
1st Vuelta a Navarra
2nd Trofeo Città di San Vendemiano
7th Trofeo Edil C
8th Trofeo Alcide Degasperi
8th GP Capodarco

=== Grand Tour general classification results timeline ===
Grand Tour	2020
Giro d'Italia	91
Tour de France	—
Vuelta a España	—

Legend
—	Did not compete
DNF	Did not finish
