= Davide Villella =

Italian cyclist

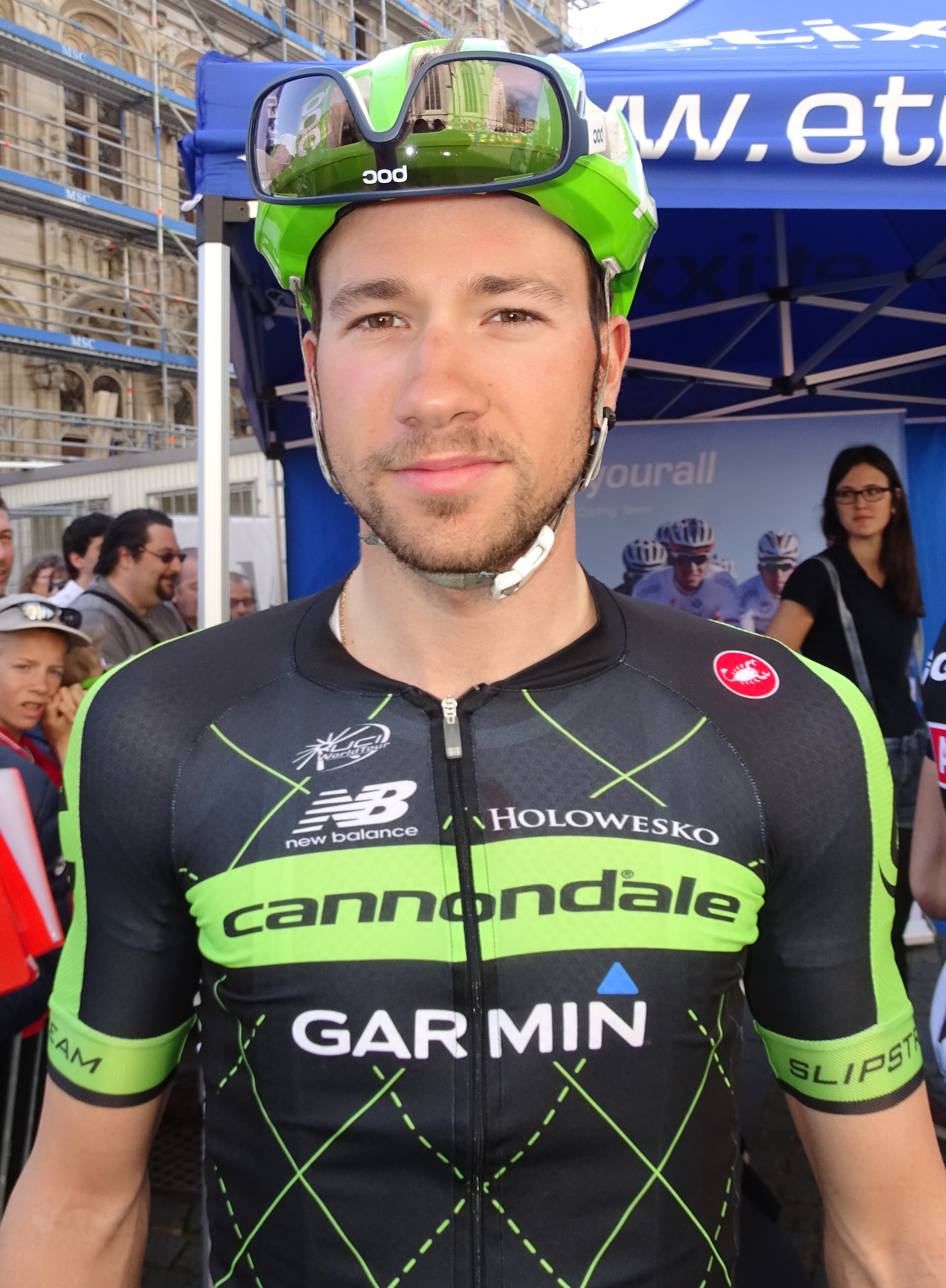
- Villella at the 2015 Brabantse Pijl

Personal information
- Full name: Davide Villella
- Born: 27 June 1991 (age 35) Magenta, Italy
- Height: 1.82 m (6 ft 0 in)
- Weight: 66 kg (146 lb; 10.4 st)

Cycling career
- Sport: Cycling
- Current team: Retired
- Discipline: Road
- Role: Rider
- Rider type: Climber

Amateur teams
- 2010–2013: De Nardi–Colpack–Bergamasca
- 2013: Cannondale (stagiaire)

Professional teams
- 2014: Cannondale
- 2015–2017: Cannondale–Garmin
- 2018–2019: Astana
- 2020–2021: Movistar Team
- 2022: Cofidis

Major wins
- Grand Tours Vuelta a España Mountains classification (2017) One-day races and Classics Japan Cup (2016)

Davide Villella (born 27 June 1991) is an Italian former professional road racing cyclist, who competed as a professional from 2014 to 2022.

== Biography ==
Born on 27 June 1991, in Magenta, Lombardy, Villella resides in Sant'Omobono Terme, Lombardy, Italy.

Villella signed with Cannondale, a UCI ProTeam, for the 2014 season. He started the 2014 Giro d'Italia, but withdrew on Stage 6. Villella signed with Cannondale–Garmin, a UCI ProTeam, for the 2015 season. He was named in the start list for the 2015 Vuelta a España.

== Major results ==
2012
2nd Piccolo Giro di Lombardia
3rd Gran Premio della Liberazione
3rd Trofeo Alcide Degasperi
6th Trofeo Edil C
7th Ruota d'Oro
8th Overall Giro della Regione Friuli Venezia Giulia

1st Points classification
1st Stages 4 & 5

9th Trofeo Franco Balestra
2013
1st Overall Giro della Valle d'Aosta

1st Points classification
1st Stages 2 & 4

1st Piccolo Giro di Lombardia
2nd Road race, National Under-23 Road Championships
2nd Trofeo Edil C
2nd Gran Premio di Poggiana
3rd Coppa Sabatini
3rd Giro dell'Emilia
4th Gran Premio Palio del Recioto
6th Road race, UCI Under-23 Road World Championships
6th Giro del Belvedere
8th Coppa della Pace
10th Road race, UEC European Under-23 Road Championships
2014
1st Mountains classification, Tour of the Basque Country
4th Overall Arctic Race of Norway

1st Young rider classification

6th Coppa Sabatini
6th Trofeo Laigueglia
2015
10th Milano–Torino
2016
1st Japan Cup
5th Giro di Lombardia
9th Giro dell'Emilia
10th Overall Critérium International
10th Overall Tour de Pologne
2017
1st Mountains classification, Vuelta a España
5th Tre Valli Varesine
2018
1st Overall Tour of Almaty

1st Points classification
1st Stage 1

2019
2nd Overall CRO Race
5th GP Industria & Artigianato di Larciano
7th Gran Piemonte
9th Overall Tour of Guangxi
2020
3rd Pollença–Andratx
2021
4th Trofeo Matteotti
5th Overall Settimana Ciclistica Italiana
5th Giro della Toscana
7th Memorial Marco Pantani

=== Grand Tour general classification results timeline ===
Grand Tour	2014	2015	2016	2017	2018	2019	2020	2021	2022
Giro d'Italia	DNF	78	—	72	70	60	40	55	63
Tour de France	Has not contested during his career								
Vuelta a España	—	94	56	97	48	—	—	—	53

Legend
—	Did not compete
DNF	Did not finish
