= 2016 Tour de Pologne =

2016 UCI World Tour, race 19 of 28

Race details
- Dates: 12–18 July 2016
- Stages: 7
- Distance: 1,190 km (739.4 mi)
- Winning time: 23h 47' 23"

Results
| Jersey awarded to the overall winner | Winner | Tim Wellens (BEL) | (Lotto–Soudal) |
| | Second | Fabio Felline (ITA) | (Trek–Segafredo) |
| | Third | Alberto Bettiol (ITA) | (Cannondale–Drapac) |
| Jersey awarded to the points classification winner | Points | Alberto Bettiol (ITA) | (Cannondale–Drapac) |
| Jersey awarded to the mountains classification winner | Mountains | Tim Wellens (BEL) | (Lotto–Soudal) |
| Jersey awarded to the combativity classification winner | Combativity | Tim Wellens (BEL) | (Lotto–Soudal) |
| | Team | Lotto–Soudal | |

The 2016 Tour de Pologne was the 73rd edition of the Tour de Pologne cycling stage race. It was scheduled from 12 to 18 July as the nineteenth event of the 2016 UCI World Tour.

== Schedule ==
| Stage | Date | Route | Distance | Type | Winner |
|---|---|---|---|---|---|
| 1 | 12 July | Radzymin to Warsaw | 138 km (86 mi) | Flat stage | Davide Martinelli (ITA) |
| 2 | 13 July | Tarnowskie Góry to Katowice | 128 km (80 mi) | Flat stage | Fernando Gaviria (COL) |
| 3 | 14 July | Zawiercie to Nowy Sącz | 240 km (149 mi) | Intermediate stage | Niccolo Bonifazio (ITA) |
| 4 | 15 July | Nowy Sącz to Rzeszów | 218 km (135 mi) | Hilly stage | Fernando Gaviria (COL) |
| 5 | 16 July | Wieliczka to Zakopane | 225 km (140 mi) | Mountain stage | Tim Wellens (BEL) |
| 6 | 17 July | Terma Bukowina Tatrzańska to Bukowina Tatrzańska | 72 km (45 mi) | Mountain stage | Stage cancelled due to weather conditions. |
| 7 | 18 July | Kraków to Kraków | 25 km (16 mi) | Individual time trial | Alex Dowsett (GBR) |
| Total | | 1,190 km (739.4 mi) | | | |

== Participating teams ==
As the Tour de Pologne is a UCI World Tour event, all eighteen UCI Pro Teams were invited automatically and obliged to enter a team into the race. Along with Team Poland – the Polish national team – six other squads were given wildcard places into the race, and as such, formed the event's 25-team peloton. The number of riders allowed per squad will be eight, therefore the start list will contain a total of 200 riders.

UCI WorldTeams (18/18)

- AG2R La Mondiale
- Astana
- BMC Racing Team
- Etixx–Quick-Step
- FDJ
- IAM Cycling
- Lampre–Merida
- Lotto–Soudal
- Movistar Team
- Team Giant–Alpecin
- Team Katusha
- LottoNL–Jumbo
- Team Dimension Data
- Team Sky
- Tinkoff
- Trek–Segafredo
- Orica–BikeExchange
- Cannondale–Drapac

UCI Professional Continental teams

- Bardiani–CSF
- Gazprom–RusVelo
- ONE Pro Cycling
- Team Novo Nordisk
- Verva ActiveJet
- CCC–Sprandi–Polkowice

National team

- Poland

== Stages ==
=== Stage 1 ===
12 July 2016 — Radzymin to Warsaw, 138 km (85.7 mi)

Stage 1 Result
| Rank | Rider | Team | Time |
|---|---|---|---|
| 1 | Davide Martinelli (ITA) | Etixx–Quick-Step | 3h 01' 10" |
| 2 | Fernando Gaviria (COL) | Etixx–Quick-Step | s.t. |
| 3 | Caleb Ewan (AUS) | Orica–BikeExchange | s.t. |
| 4 | Zdeněk Štybar (CZE) | Etixx–Quick-Step | s.t. |
| 5 | Moreno Hofland (NED) | LottoNL–Jumbo | s.t. |
| 6 | Philippe Gilbert (BEL) | BMC Racing Team | s.t. |
| 7 | Kévin Reza (FRA) | FDJ | s.t. |
| 8 | Michał Kwiatkowski (POL) | Team Sky | s.t. |
| 9 | Tim Wellens (BEL) | Lotto–Soudal | s.t. |
| 10 | Sacha Modolo (ITA) | Lampre–Merida | s.t. |

General classification after Stage 1
| Rank | Rider | Team | Time |
|---|---|---|---|
| 1 | Davide Martinelli (ITA) | Etixx–Quick-Step | 3h 01' 00" |
| 2 | Fernando Gaviria (COL) | Etixx–Quick-Step | + 4" |
| 3 | Caleb Ewan (AUS) | Orica–BikeExchange | + 6" |
| 4 | Zdeněk Štybar (CZE) | Etixx–Quick-Step | + 10" |
| 5 | Moreno Hofland (NED) | LottoNL–Jumbo | + 10" |
| 6 | Philippe Gilbert (BEL) | BMC Racing Team | + 10" |
| 7 | Kévin Reza (FRA) | FDJ | + 10" |
| 8 | Michał Kwiatkowski (POL) | Team Sky | + 10" |
| 9 | Tim Wellens (BEL) | Lotto–Soudal | + 10" |
| 10 | Sacha Modolo (ITA) | Lampre–Merida | + 10" |

=== Stage 2 ===
13 July 2016 — Tarnowskie Góry to Katowice, 128 km (79.5 mi)

Result of Stage 2
| Rank | Rider | Team | Time |
|---|---|---|---|
| 1 | Fernando Gaviria (COL) | Etixx–Quick-Step | 3h 19' 30" |
| 2 | Elia Viviani (ITA) | Team Sky | s.t. |
| 3 | Caleb Ewan (AUS) | Orica–BikeExchange | s.t. |
| 4 | Kristian Sbaragli (ITA) | Team Dimension Data | s.t. |
| 5 | Moreno Hofland (NED) | LottoNL–Jumbo | s.t. |
| 6 | Niccolò Bonifazio (ITA) | Trek–Segafredo | s.t. |
| 7 | Heinrich Haussler (AUS) | IAM Cycling | s.t. |
| 8 | Nikias Arndt (GER) | Team Giant–Alpecin | s.t. |
| 9 | Jasper De Buyst (BEL) | Lotto–Soudal | s.t. |
| 10 | Kamil Zieliński (POL) | Poland (national) | s.t. |

General classification after Stage 2
| Rank | Rider | Team | Time |
|---|---|---|---|
| 1 | Fernando Gaviria (COL) | Etixx–Quick-Step | 6h 20' 24" |
| 2 | Davide Martinelli (ITA) | Etixx–Quick-Step | + 6" |
| 3 | Caleb Ewan (AUS) | Orica–BikeExchange | + 8" |
| 4 | Diego Ulissi (ITA) | Lampre–Merida | + 14" |
| 5 | Moreno Hofland (NED) | LottoNL–Jumbo | + 16" |
| 6 | Nikias Arndt (GER) | Team Giant–Alpecin | + 16" |
| 7 | Niccolò Bonifazio (ITA) | Trek–Segafredo | + 16" |
| 8 | Lorrenzo Manzin (FRA) | FDJ | + 16" |
| 9 | Michał Kwiatkowski (POL) | Team Sky | + 16" |
| 10 | Philippe Gilbert (BEL) | BMC Racing Team | + 16" |

=== Stage 3 ===
14 July 2016 — Zawiercie to Nowy Sącz, 240 km (150 mi)

Result of Stage 3
| Rank | Rider | Team | Time |
|---|---|---|---|
| 1 | Niccolò Bonifazio (ITA) | Trek–Segafredo | 5h 46' 12" |
| 2 | Moreno Hofland (NED) | LottoNL–Jumbo | s.t. |
| 3 | Luka Mezgec (SLO) | Orica–BikeExchange | s.t. |
| 4 | Heinrich Haussler (AUS) | IAM Cycling | s.t. |
| 5 | Roman Maikin (RUS) | Gazprom–RusVelo | s.t. |
| 6 | Kristian Sbaragli (ITA) | Team Dimension Data | s.t. |
| 7 | Ruslan Tleubayev (KAZ) | Astana | s.t. |
| 8 | Loïc Vliegen (BEL) | BMC Racing Team | s.t. |
| 9 | Sacha Modolo (ITA) | Lampre–Merida | s.t. |
| 10 | Koen de Kort (NED) | Team Giant–Alpecin | s.t. |

General classification after Stage 3
| Rank | Rider | Team | Time |
|---|---|---|---|
| 1 | Fernando Gaviria (COL) | Etixx–Quick-Step | 12h 06' 36" |
| 2 | Niccolò Bonifazio (ITA) | Trek–Segafredo | + 6" |
| 3 | Caleb Ewan (AUS) | Orica–BikeExchange | + 8" |
| 4 | Moreno Hofland (NED) | LottoNL–Jumbo | + 10" |
| 5 | Diego Ulissi (ITA) | Lampre–Merida | + 14" |
| 6 | Roman Maikin (RUS) | Gazprom–RusVelo | + 16" |
| 7 | Lorrenzo Manzin (FRA) | FDJ | + 16" |
| 8 | Sacha Modolo (ITA) | Lampre–Merida | + 16" |
| 9 | Heinrich Haussler (AUS) | IAM Cycling | + 16" |
| 10 | Michał Kwiatkowski (POL) | Team Sky | + 16" |

=== Stage 4 ===
15 July 2016 — Nowy Sącz to Rzeszów, 218 km (135 mi)

Result of Stage 4
| Rank | Rider | Team | Time |
|---|---|---|---|
| 1 | Fernando Gaviria (COL) | Etixx–Quick-Step | 5h 12' 56" |
| 2 | Luka Mezgec (SLO) | Orica–BikeExchange | s.t. |
| 3 | Michał Kwiatkowski (POL) | Team Sky | s.t. |
| 4 | Heinrich Haussler (AUS) | IAM Cycling | s.t. |
| 5 | Boy van Poppel (NED) | Trek–Segafredo | s.t. |
| 6 | Zico Waeytens (BEL) | Team Giant–Alpecin | s.t. |
| 7 | Tiesj Benoot (BEL) | Lotto–Soudal | s.t. |
| 8 | Enrico Battaglin (ITA) | LottoNL–Jumbo | s.t. |
| 9 | Kristian Sbaragli (ITA) | Team Dimension Data | s.t. |
| 10 | Kévin Reza (FRA) | FDJ | s.t. |

General classification after Stage 4
| Rank | Rider | Team | Time |
|---|---|---|---|
| 1 | Fernando Gaviria (COL) | Etixx–Quick-Step | 17h 19' 22" |
| 2 | Michał Kwiatkowski (POL) | Team Sky | + 19" |
| 3 | Diego Ulissi (ITA) | Lampre–Merida | + 22" |
| 4 | Tim Wellens (BEL) | Lotto–Soudal | + 25" |
| 5 | Heinrich Haussler (AUS) | IAM Cycling | + 26" |
| 6 | Roman Maikin (RUS) | Gazprom–RusVelo | + 26" |
| 7 | Sacha Modolo (ITA) | Lampre–Merida | + 26" |
| 8 | Floris Gerts (NED) | BMC Racing Team | + 26" |
| 9 | Philippe Gilbert (BEL) | BMC Racing Team | + 26" |
| 10 | Kamil Zieliński (POL) | Poland (national) | + 26" |

=== Stage 5 ===
16 July 2016 — Wieliczka to Zakopane, 225 km (140 mi)

Stage 5 Result

| | Rider | Team | Time |
|---|---|---|---|
| 1 | Tim Wellens (BEL) | Lotto–Soudal | 5h 57' 22" |
| 2 | Davide Formolo (ITA) | Cannondale–Drapac | + 3' 48" |
| 3 | Tiesj Benoot (BEL) | Lotto–Soudal | + 4' 37" |
| 4 | Fabio Felline (ITA) | Trek–Segafredo | + 4' 38" |
| 5 | Alberto Bettiol (ITA) | Cannondale–Drapac | + 4' 49" |
| 6 | Larry Warbasse (USA) | IAM Cycling | + 5' 12" |
| 7 | Andrey Zeits (KAZ) | Astana | + 5' 12" |
| 8 | Rubén Fernández (ESP) | Movistar Team | + 5' 27" |
| 9 | Matvey Mamykin (RUS) | Team Katusha | + 5' 32" |
| 10 | Davide Villella (ITA) | Cannondale–Drapac | + 5' 59" |

General classification after Stage 5

| | Rider | Team | Time |
|---|---|---|---|
| 1 | Tim Wellens (BEL) | Lotto–Soudal | 23h 16' 53" |
| 2 | Davide Formolo (ITA) | Cannondale–Drapac | + 4' 05" |
| 3 | Tiesj Benoot (BEL) | Lotto–Soudal | + 4' 50" |
| 4 | Fabio Felline (ITA) | Trek–Segafredo | + 5' 04" |
| 5 | Alberto Bettiol (ITA) | Cannondale–Drapac | + 5' 12" |
| 6 | Andrey Zeits (KAZ) | Astana | + 5' 29" |
| 7 | Larry Warbasse (USA) | IAM Cycling | + 5' 38" |
| 8 | Rubén Fernández (ESP) | Movistar Team | + 5' 44" |
| 9 | Dario Cataldo (ITA) | Astana | + 6' 16" |
| 10 | Davide Villella (ITA) | Cannondale–Drapac | + 6' 25" |

=== Stage 6 ===
17 July 2016 — Terma Bukowina Tatrzańska to Bukowina Tatrzańska, ~~194 km (121 mi)~~ ~~117 km (73 mi)~~ ~~72 km (45 mi)~~

- Stage cancelled due to weather conditions.

=== Stage 7 ===
18 July 2016 — Kraków to Kraków, 25 km (16 mi), individual time trial (ITT)

Stage 7 Result

| | Rider | Team | Time |
|---|---|---|---|
| 1 | Alex Dowsett (GBR) | Movistar Team | 28' 59" |
| 2 | Jonathan Castroviejo (ESP) | Movistar Team | + 22" |
| 3 | Primož Roglič (SLO) | LottoNL–Jumbo | + 39" |
| 4 | Ben Hermans (BEL) | BMC Racing Team | + 41" |
| 5 | Victor Campenaerts (BEL) | LottoNL–Jumbo | + 48" |
| 6 | Fabio Felline (ITA) | Trek–Segafredo | + 49" |
| 7 | Svein Tuft (CAN) | Orica–BikeExchange | + 1' 11" |
| 8 | Alberto Bettiol (ITA) | Cannondale–Drapac | + 1' 13" |
| 9 | Daniele Bennati (ITA) | Tinkoff | + 1' 19" |
| 10 | Victor de la Parte (ESP) | CCC–Sprandi–Polkowice | + 1' 21" |

General classification after Stage 7

| | Rider | Team | Time |
|---|---|---|---|
| 1 | Tim Wellens (BEL) | Lotto–Soudal | 23h 47' 23" |
| 2 | Fabio Felline (ITA) | Trek–Segafredo | + 4' 22" |
| 3 | Alberto Bettiol (ITA) | Cannondale–Drapac | + 4' 54" |
| 4 | Davide Formolo (ITA) | Cannondale–Drapac | + 5' 06" |
| 5 | Tiesj Benoot (BEL) | Lotto–Soudal | + 5' 22" |
| 6 | Rubén Fernández (ESP) | Movistar Team | + 5' 45" |
| 7 | Larry Warbasse (USA) | IAM Cycling | + 5' 47" |
| 8 | Andrey Zeits (KAZ) | Astana | + 6' 08" |
| 9 | Dario Cataldo (ITA) | Astana | + 6' 20" |
| 10 | Davide Villella (ITA) | Cannondale–Drapac | + 8' 01" |

== Classification leadership ==
| Stage | Winner | General classification Żółta koszulka Skandia | Sprinters classification Klasyfikacja sprinterska Hyundai | Mountains classification Klasyfikacja górska Tauron | Most active rider classification Klasyfikacja najaktywniejszych | Best Polish rider Najlepszy Polak | Teams classification Klasyfikacja drużynowa |
|---|---|---|---|---|---|---|---|
| 1 | Davide Martinelli | Davide Martinelli | Davide Martinelli | Jarosław Marycz | Marc Fournier | Michał Kwiatkowski | Etixx–Quick-Step |
| 2 | Fernando Gaviria | Fernando Gaviria | Fernando Gaviria | Jarosław Marycz | Jonas Koch | Michał Kwiatkowski | Team Sky |
| 3 | Niccolò Bonifazio | Fernando Gaviria | Moreno Hofland | Kamil Gradek | Jonas Koch | Michał Kwiatkowski | Team Sky |
| 4 | Fernando Gaviria | Fernando Gaviria | Fernando Gaviria | Alessandro Tonelli | Jonas Koch | Michał Kwiatkowski | Team Sky |
| 5 | Tim Wellens | Tim Wellens | Moreno Hofland | Tim Wellens | Tim Wellens | Paweł Cieślik | Lotto–Soudal |
| 6 | Stage cancelled | Tim Wellens | Moreno Hofland | Tim Wellens | Tim Wellens | Paweł Cieślik | Lotto–Soudal |
| 7 | Alex Dowsett | Tim Wellens | Alberto Bettiol | Tim Wellens | Tim Wellens | Paweł Cieślik | Lotto–Soudal |
| Final | | Tim Wellens | Alberto Bettiol | Tim Wellens | Tim Wellens | Paweł Cieślik | Lotto–Soudal |
