= Gianfranco Zilioli =

Italian cyclist

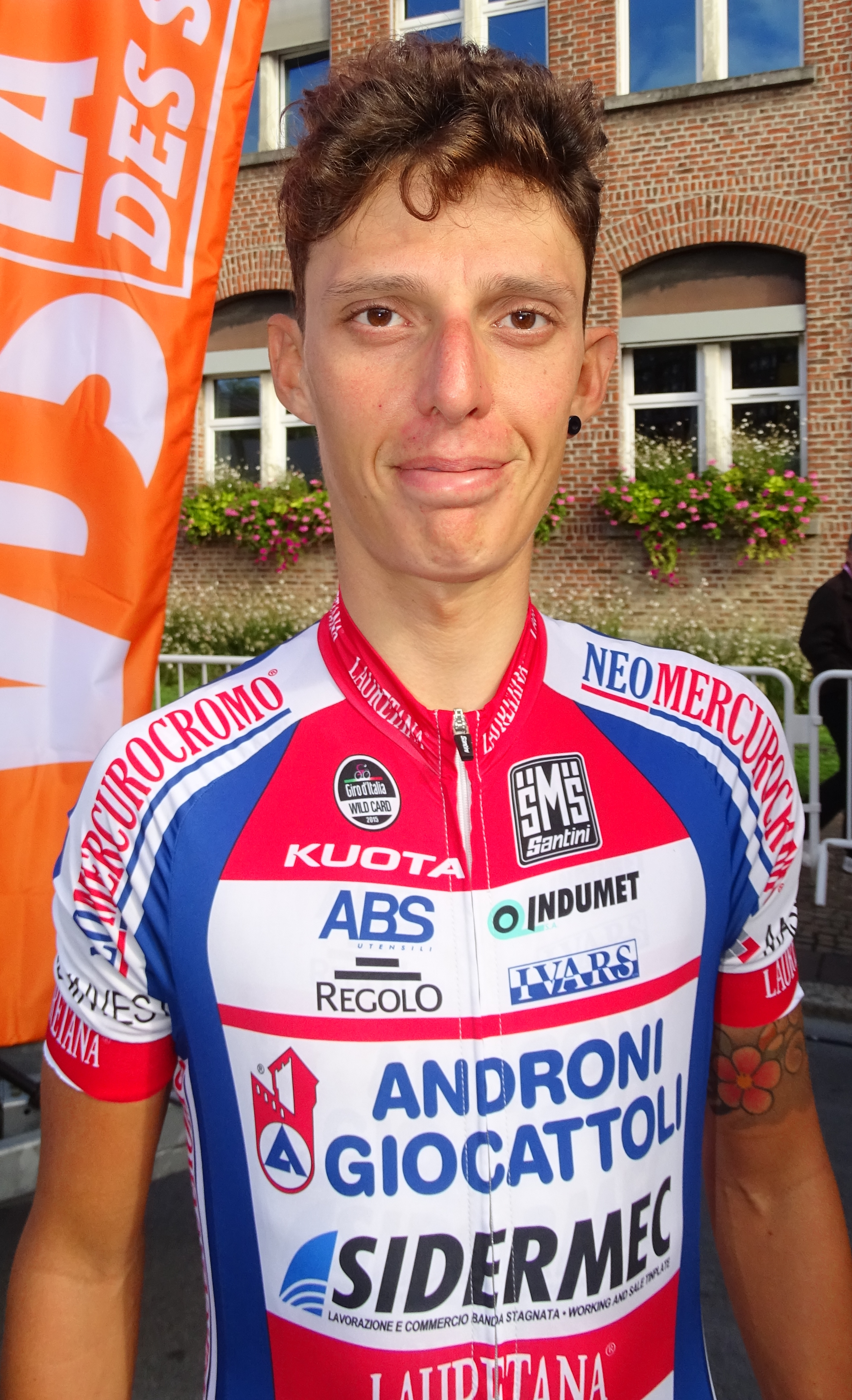
- Zilioli in 2015

Personal information
- Full name: Gianfranco Zilioli
- Born: 5 March 1990 (age 36) Clusone, Italy

Cycling career
- Sport: Cycling
- Current team: Retired
- Discipline: Road
- Role: Rider

Amateur team
- 2009–2012: U.C. Bergamasca 1902–De Nardi–Colpack

Professional teams
- 2013–2015: Androni Giocattoli–Venezuela
- 2016: Nippo–Vini Fantini

Major wins
- One-day races and Classics GP di Prato (2013)

Gianfranco Zilioli (born 5 March 1990) is an Italian former professional racing cyclist.

== Major results ==
2010
9th Overall Giro della Valle d'Aosta
9th Trofeo Gianfranco Bianchin
2011
1st Coppa Città di San Daniele
6th Giro del Belvedere
10th Overall Giro della Valle d'Aosta
2012
1st GP Capodarco
2nd Gran Premio di Poggiana
5th Overall Giro della Valle d'Aosta
6th Giro del Medio Brenta
6th Gran Premio Palio del Recioto
2013
1st Gran Premio Industria e Commercio di Prato
3rd GP Capodarco
3rd Piccolo Giro di Lombardia
6th Overall Settimana Ciclistica Lombarda
7th Coppa della Pace
2014
6th Overall Sibiu Cycling Tour
7th Giro dell'Emilia
7th GP Industria & Artigianato di Larciano
8th Overall Tour de Langkawi
10th Giro di Toscana
2015
4th Road race, National Road Championships
6th Coppa Bernocchi

=== Grand Tour general classification results timeline ===
Grand Tour	2015	2016
Giro d'Italia	71	118
Tour de France	—	—
Vuelta a España	—	—

Legend
—	Did not compete
DNF	Did not finish
