= Edoardo Girardi =

Italian cyclist

Personal information
- Born: 22 October 1985 (age 40) Busto Arsizio, Italy
- Height: 1.85 m (6 ft 1 in)
- Weight: 72 kg (159 lb)

Cycling career
- Sport: Cycling
- Current team: Retired
- Discipline: Road
- Role: Rider

Professional teams
- 2009: Amica Chips–Knauf
- 2010: Ceramica Flaminia
- 2011–2012: De Rosa–Ceramica Flaminia

Edoardo Girardi (born 22 October 1985 in Busto Arsizio) is an Italian former road cyclist.

== Major results ==
2007
1st Gran Premio di Poggiana
4th GP Capodarco
2008
2nd Gran Premio Città di Felino
3rd Ruota d'Oro
6th Gran Premio Inda
6th Trofeo Città di Brescia
2011
7th Gran Premio Città di Camaiore
9th Trofeo Matteotti
2012
8th Trofeo Laigueglia
