= Davide Orrico =

Italian cyclist

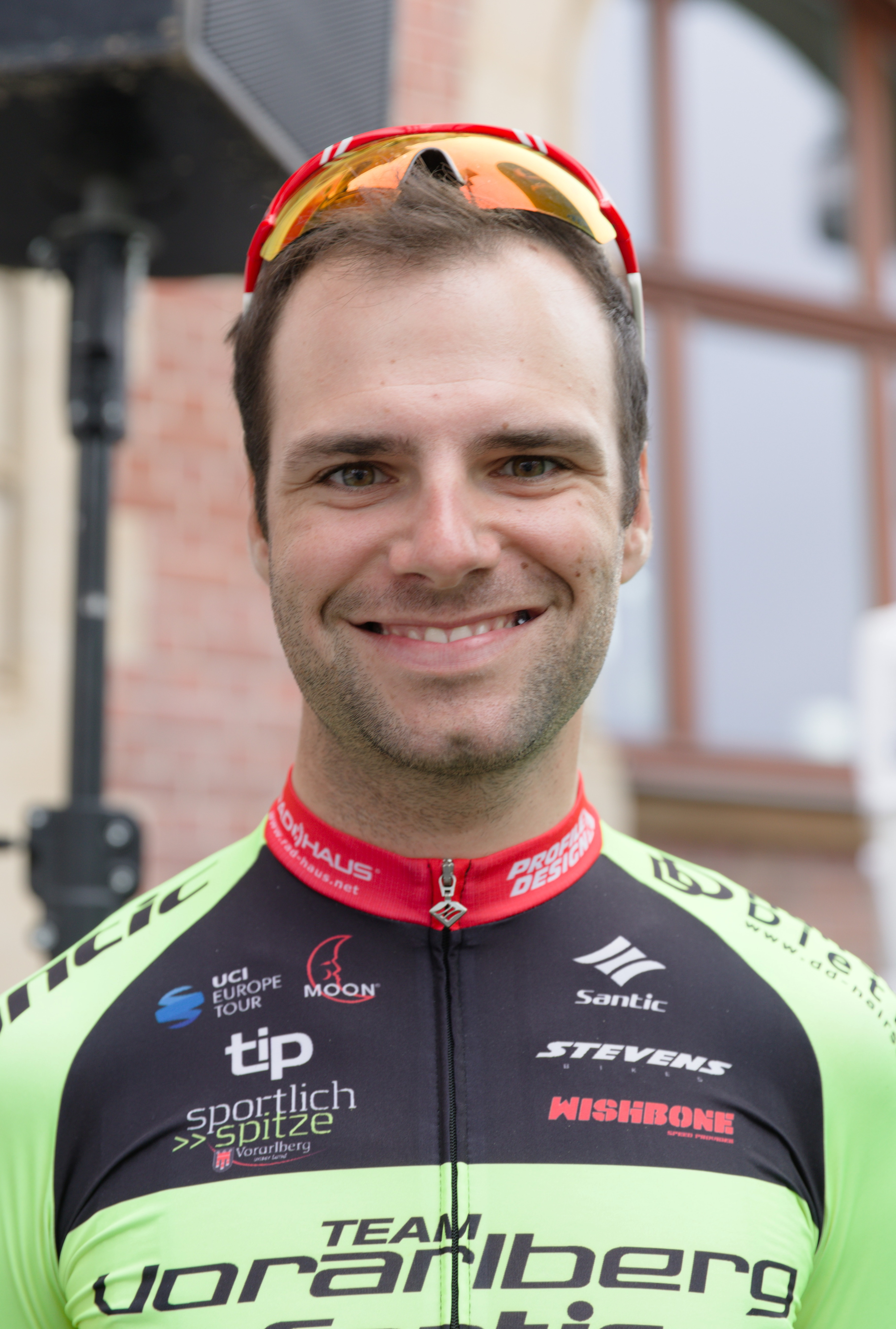
- Orrico in 2018

Personal information
- Full name: Davide Orrico
- Born: 17 February 1990 (age 36) Como, Italy
- Weight: 70 kg (154 lb)

Cycling career
- Sport: Cycling
- Discipline: Road
- Role: Rider

Amateur team
- 2009–2016: U.C. Bergamasca 1902–De Nardi–Colpack

Professional teams
- 2017: Sangemini–MG.K Vis
- 2018–2020: Team Vorarlberg Santic
- 2021: Vini Zabù

Davide Orrico (born 17 February 1990) is an Italian cyclist, who last rode for UCI ProTeam Vini Zabù.

== Major results ==
2007
9th Trofeo comune di Vertova
2012
6th Gran Premio di Poggiana
2013
5th Piccolo Giro di Lombardia
5th Gran Premio San Giuseppe
6th Overall Giro del Friuli-Venezia Giulia
2014
9th Overall Giro del Friuli-Venezia Giulia
2016
5th Giro del Medio Brenta
8th Overall Circuit des Ardennes
9th Trofeo Edil C
2017
3rd Gran Premio di Lugano
4th Overall Tour of Albania
10th GP Adria Mobil
2018
1st Mountains classification Tour de Savoie Mont-Blanc
6th Coppa Ugo Agostoni
9th Overall Oberösterreich Rundfahrt
2021
8th Gran Premio di Lugano
10th Giro del Veneto
