= Iuri Filosi =

Italian cyclist

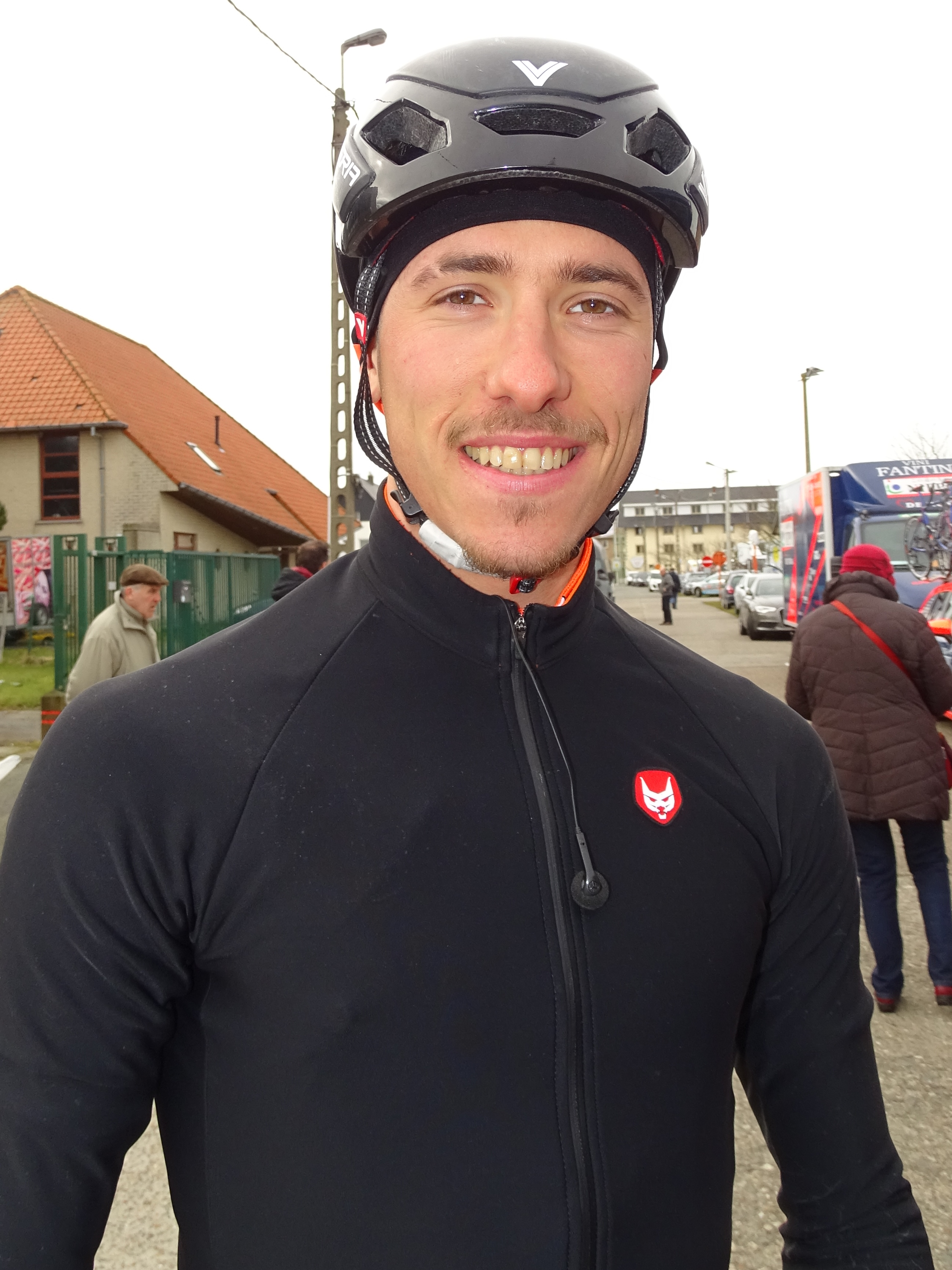
- Filosi in 2016

Personal information
- Full name: Iuri Filosi
- Born: 17 January 1992 (age 34) Lombardy, Italy
- Height: 1.84 m (6 ft 0 in)
- Weight: 70 kg (154 lb)

Cycling career
- Sport: Cycling
- Current team: Retired
- Discipline: Road
- Role: Rider

Amateur teams
- 2011: Team Idea
- 2012–2013: Viris Maserati
- 2014: Team Colpack

Professional teams
- 2015–2017: Nippo–Vini Fantini
- 2018–2019: Delko–Marseille Provence KTM
- 2020: Bardiani–CSF–Faizanè
- 2021: Giotti Victoria–Savini Due

Major wins
- One-day races and Classics Gran Premio di Lugano (2017)
Medal record
Representing Italy
Men's road bicycle racing
European Championships
Silver medal – second place	2014 Nyon	Under-23 road race

Iuri Filosi (born 17 January 1992) is an Italian former professional racing cyclist. He was named in the start list for the 2016 Giro d'Italia, but finished outside the time limit on Stage 8.

== Major results ==
2013
2nd Piccolo Giro di Lombardia
2014
2nd Road race, UEC European Under-23 Road Championships
5th Gran Premio della Liberazione
6th Road race, UCI Under-23 Road World Championships
6th Gran Premio Palio del Recioto
2015
7th Gran Premio Nobili Rubinetterie
2016
5th Volta Limburg Classic
2017
1st Gran Premio di Lugano
8th Overall Four Days of Dunkirk
2018
10th Circuito de Getxo

=== Grand Tour general classification results timeline ===
Grand Tour	2016
Giro d'Italia	DNF
Tour de France	—
Vuelta a España	—

Legend
—	Did not compete
DNF	Did not finish
