= MBH Bank CSB Telecom Fort =

Cycling team

Team information
- UCI code: MBH
- Registered: Italy
- Founded: 1999
- Discipline: Road
- Status: National (1999–2018); UCI Continental (2019–2025); UCI ProTeam (2026–)
- Website: Team home page

Key personnel
- General manager: Antonio Bevilacqua
- Team managers: Giuseppe Dileo; Rosa Dileo; Flavio Miozzo; Ivan Quaranta; Gianluca Valoti

Team name history
- 1999–2002 2003 2004 2005–2007 2008–2009 2010 2011–2019 2020–2022 2023 2024 2025 2026–: UC Bergamasca 1902–For 3 UC Bergamasca 1902–For 3–Las Helmets; UC Bergamasca 1902–Las Helmets–Cremasca; UC Bergamasca 1902; U.C. Bergamasca 1902–De Nardi–Colpack; De Nardi–Colpack–Bergamasca; Team Colpack; Team Colpack–Ballan; Team Colpack–Ballan–CSB; Team MBH Bank Colpack Ballan; MBH Bank Ballan CSB; MBH Bank CSB Telecom Fort

MBH Bank CSB Telecom Fort is a Hungarian UCI ProTeam status cycling team. Prior to 2026 the team was based in Bergamo, Italy, and held UCI Continental status. The name Colpack is familiar to Italian teams, having previously been a co-sponsor of the De Nardi-Colpack and Team Colpack-Astro squads.

In January 2017 it was announced that Colpack had become the official development squad for the new Bahrain–Merida team.

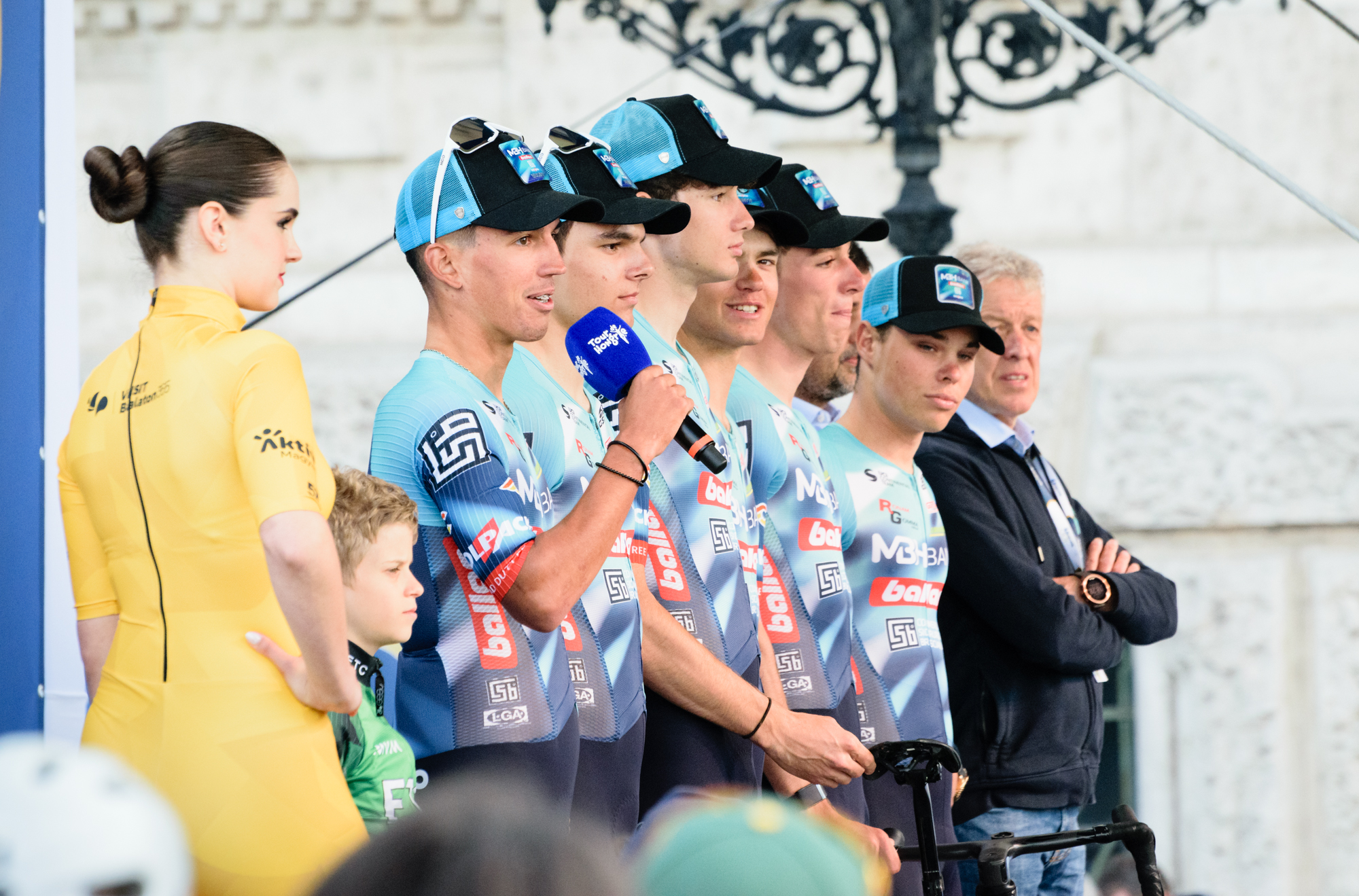
The team at the 2025 Tour de Hongrie

== Team roster ==
As of 9 July 2024.

Rider	Date of birth
Matteo Ambrosini (ITA)	23 April 2002 (age 24)
Christian Bagatin (ITA)	14 June 2002 (age 24)
Davide Boscaro (ITA)	13 July 2000 (age 26)
Diego Bracalente (ITA)	6 December 2004 (age 21)
Gabriele Casalini (ITA)	9 October 2004 (age 21)
Edoardo Cipollini (ITA)	27 April 2005 (age 21)
Florian Samuel Kajamini (ITA)	28 February 2003 (age 23)
Zoltán Antal Lepold (HUN)	5 July 2003 (age 23)
Lorenzo Masciarelli (ITA)	22 October 2003 (age 22)

Rider	Date of birth
Sergio Meris (ITA)	10 March 2001 (age 25)
Angelo Monister (ITA)	20 May 2005 (age 21)
Lorenzo Nespoli (ITA)	30 September 2004 (age 21)
Pavel Novák (CZE)	3 December 2004 (age 21)
Bálint Orosz (HUN)	24 January 2003 (age 23)
Samuel Quaranta (ITA)	15 April 2002 (age 24)
Márk Valent (HUN)	11 June 2004 (age 22)
Leonardo Vesco (ITA)	30 July 2005 (age 21)
Leonardo Volpato (ITA)	14 December 2004 (age 21)

== Major results ==
2011
Coppa del Grano, Davide Villella
Trofeo Velo Plus, Stefano Locatelli
Trofeo Memorial Tito Squadroni, Andrea Di Corrado
Targa D’Oro Città di Legnano, Davide Orrico
Memorial Angelo Ripamonti, Davide Villella
Gran Premio Vini DOC Valdadige, Andrea Di Corrado
Stage 2 Giro delle Valli Cuneesi nelle Alpi del Mare, Stefano Locatelli
Santo Stefano Lodigiano, Joshua Edmondson
Trofeo Città di Conegliano, Andrea Di Corrado
Circuito Castelnovese, Stefano Perego
Trofeo Raffaele Marcoli, Giacomo Mossali
San Daniele del Friuli, Gianfranco Zilioli
2012
Giro delle Tre Provincie–Limito di Pioltello, Nicola Ruffoni
Milano–Busseto, Nicola Ruffoni
Memorial Gerry Gasparotto, Edoardo Zardini
Memorial Angelo Fumagalli, Davide Villella
Trofeo Papa' Cervi, Giorgio Bocchiola
Coppa Romano Ballerini–Trofeo Moscolari, Nicola Ruffoni
Stages 4 & 5 Giro della Regione Friuli Venezia Giulia, Davide Villella
GP Industria Commercio Artigianato Botticino, Davide Villella
Stages 2 & 3 Giro Ciclistico Pesche Nettarine di Romagna, Davide Villella
Trofeo Parco del Delta del Po, Nicola Ruffoni
Gran Premio Vini DOC Valdadige, Davide Villella
Trofeo Città di Brescia–Memorial Rino Fiori, Davide Villella
Trofeo Antonietto Rancilio, Nicola Ruffoni
Circuito Ciclistico di Ciriè, Davide Villella
Bassano–Monte Grappa, Gianfranco Zilioli
Overall Giro delle Valli Cuneesi nelle Alpi del Mare, Edoardo Zardini

Stage 3, Edoardo Zardini

Circuito Salese, Nicola Ruffoni
GP Ciclistico Arcade, Nicola Ruffoni
GP Capodarco, Gianfranco Zilioli
Trofeo Città di Conegliano, Davide Villella
Circuito Guazzorese, Nicola Ruffoni
Trofeo Mp Filtri, Edoardo Zardini
Medaglia d'Oro Fiera di Sommacampagna, Nicola Ruffoni
2013
Coppa Città di Melzo, Nicola Ruffoni
La Popolarissima, Nicola Ruffoni
Trofeo Antonietto Rancilio, Mattia Marcelli
Classica di Colbuccaro, Davide Orrico
Coppa Caduti Nervianesi, Davide Orrico
Stages 1 & 2 Giro della Regione Friuli Venezia Giulia, Nicola Ruffoni
Medaglia d'Oro Domenico e Anita Colleoni, Davide Villella
Trofeo Lindo e Sano, Nicola Ruffoni
Parma–La Spezia, Gianfranco Zilioli
Giro dei Tre Ponti, Nicola Ruffoni
Italy National U23 Road Championships, Road Race, Paolo Colonna
Mediterranean Games, Road, Elite, Nicola Ruffoni
Gardone Val Trompia, Gianfranco Zilioli
Giro Valli Aretine, Gianfranco Zilioli
Giro del Casentino, Gianfranco Zilioli
Overall Giro della Valle d'Aosta, Davide Villella

Stages 2 & 4, Davide Villella

Circuito Ciclistico di Ciriè, Gianfranco Zilioli
Overall Giro delle Valli Cuneesi nelle Alpi del Mare, Gianfranco Zilioli

Stage 2, Gianfranco Zilioli

Italy National Track Championships (Omnium), Simone Consonni
Corsa delle Stelle Cadenti, Giorgio Bocchiola
Trofeo Marco Rusconi, Davide Villella
Targa Libero Ferrario, Francesco Rosa
Trofeo Rigoberto Lamonica, Paolo Colonna
Piccolo Giro di Lombardia, Davide Villella
Giro del Canavese–Trofeo Sportivi Valperghesi, Francesco Rosa
Copa Internacional de Pista

Team Pursuit, Francesco Lamon
Omnium, Simone Consonni
Madison, Simone Consonni

2014
Piccola Sanremo, Iuri Filosi
Trofeo Mario Zanchi, Davide Martinelli
Coppa Caduti Nervianesi, Damiano Cima
Stages 1 & 2 Bidasoa Itzulia, Iuri Filosi
Pregnana Milanese, Simone Consonni
San Giovanni di Livenza, Davide Martinelli

Stage 1 Giro della Pesca e Nettarina, Luca Pacioni

Ponte San Giovanni Chrono, Davide Martinelli

Overall Giro della Pesca e Nettarina, Iuri Filosi

Medaglia d'Oro Domenico e Anita Colleoni, Manuel Senni
Italy National U23 Road Championship, Time Trial, Davide Martinelli
Coppa Giuseppe Romita, Simone Consonni
Roncoleva di Trevenzuola, Simone Consonni
Coppa Quagliotti, Luca Pacioni
Medaglia Oro Nino Ronco, Francesco Rosa
Stages 1 & 2 Giro della Valle d'Aosta, Manuel Senni
Bosco Chiesanuova, Giulio Ciccone
Stage 3 Giro delle Valli Cuneesi nelle Alpi del Mare, Edward Ravasi
Memorial Gigi Pezzoni, Luca Pacioni
Giro del Valdarno, Fausto Masnada
Circuito Viguzzolese, Luca Pacioni
Targa Libero Ferrario, Luca Pacioni
Coppa Collecchio, Damiano Cima
Trofeo Rigoberto Lamonica, Giulio Ciccone
Trofeo Gavardo Tecmor, Oliviero Troia
Piccolo Giro d'Emilia, Simone Consonni

Italy National Track Championships (Points race), Francesco Lamon

Giro del Canavese–Trofeo Sportivi Valperghesi, Edward Ravasi
Coppa Mobilio Ponsacco–Linea, Simone Consonni
2015
La Torre Fucecchio, Davide Martinelli
Trofeo Auro Boreri, Simone Consonni
Piccola Sanremo, Simone Consonni
Circuito del Porto, Riccardo Minali
Parma-La Spezia, Davide Martinelli
Memorial Denis Zanette e Daniele Del Ben, Francesco Lamon
Fiorenzuola d'Arda (Points race), Simone Consonni
Italy National U23 Road Championship, Time Trial, Davide Martinelli
Bassano–Monte Grappa, Giulio Ciccone
GP Città di Felino, Simone Consonni
Piccolo Giro di Lombardia, Fausto Masnada
2016
GP Laguna, Filippo Ganna
UCI Track Cycling World Championships (Team pursuit), Filippo Ganna
La Popolarissima, Riccardo Minali
Vicenza–Bionde, Riccardo Minali
Overall Bidasoa Itzulia, Umberto Orsini

Stage 1, Edward Ravasi
Stage 3, Oliviero Troia

Trofeo Città di San Vendemiano, Simone Consonni
Trofeo Città di Castelfidardo, Riccardo Minali
Paris–Roubaix Espoirs, Filippo Ganna
Italy National U23 Road Championship, Time Trial, Filippo Ganna
Ukraine National U23 Road Championship, Time Trial, Mark Padun
Italy National U23 Road Championship, Road Race, Simone Consonni
Cronoscalata Gardone Val Trompia–Prati di Caregno, Andrea Garosio
Memorial Angelo Fumagalli, Davide Orrico
Giro del Medio Brenta, Fausto Masnada
(Europe) U23 UEC European Track Championships (Individual pursuit), Filippo Ganna
Stage 2 Giro della Valle d'Aosta, Mark Padun
Stage 5 Giro della Valle d'Aosta, Edward Ravasi
Fiorenzuola d'Arda

Individual pursuit, Filippo Ganna
Madison, Attilio Viviani

Gran Premio Industria e Commercio Artigianato Carnaghese, Simone Consonni
GP Ezio del Rosso, Umberto Orsini
Italy National Track Championships (Points Race), Francesco Lamon
Italy National Track Championships (Omnium), Simone Consonni
2017
GP Laguna, Andrea Toniatti
Coppa San Geo, Leonardo Bonifazio
GP de Nardi, Leonardo Bonifazio
Piccola Sanremo, Andrea Toniatti
Trofeo Auro Boreri, Pietro Andreoletti
Trofeo Banca Popolare di Vicenza, Mark Padun
Trofeo Edil C, Marco Negrente
Gran Premio della Liberazione, Seid Lizde
Stage 2 Bidasoa Itzulia, Matteo Sobrero
Stage 4 Bidasoa Itzulia, Marco Negrente
Trofeo Alcide Degasperi, Andrea Toniatti
Stage 3 Baby Giro, Mark Padun
Stage 2 Giro della Valle d'Aosta, Giovanni Carboni
Stage 5 Giro della Valle d'Aosta, Alessandro Fedeli
Astico Brenta, Giovanni Carboni
Coppa Collecchio, Federico Sartor
2018
La Torre Fucecchio, Alessandro Covi
Piccola Sanremo, Filippo Rocchetti
Overall Toscana-Terra di Ciclismo, Andrea Bagioli

Stage 3, Andrea Bagioli

Stages 3 & 4 Bidasoa Itzulia, Alessandro Covi
Overall Vuelta a Navarra, Francesco Romano

Stage 4, Francesco Romano

Trofeo Città di Brescia, Filippo Rocchetti
(Europe) UEC European Track Championships (Team pursuit), Francesco Lamon
Stage 6 Tour de l'Avenir, Alessandro Covi
Astico Brenta, Davide Baldaccini
Italy National Track Championships (Omnium), Francesco Lamon
Italy National Track Championships (Madison), Francesco Lamon
Stage 1a Tour de la Nouvelle-Calédonie, Riccardo Lucca
2019
Trofeo Città di San Vendemiano, Andrea Bagioli
Overall Ronde de l'Isard, Andrea Bagioli

Stages 2 & 3, Andrea Bagioli

2021
Trofeo Banca Popolare di Vicenza, Juan Ayuso
Giro del Belvedere, Juan Ayuso
Gran Premio della Liberazione, Michele Gazzoli
Overall Giro di Romagna per Dante Alighieri, Juan Ayuso

Stages 2 & 3, Juan Ayuso

Overall Giro Ciclistico d'Italia, Juan Ayuso

Stages 2, 5 & 7, Juan Ayuso
Stage 4 (ITT), Filippo Baroncini

Stage 1 Giro della Valle d'Aosta, Alessandro Verre
2022
La Popolarissima, Nicolás David Gómez
Circuito del Porto, Davide Persico
2025
Gran Premio Palio del Recioto, Lorenzo Nespoli
Gran Premio della Liberazione, Lorenzo Masciarelli
2026
La Popolarissima, Davide Persico
GP Slovenian Istria, Nicolò Buratti
Stage 6, Presidential Cycling Tour of Turkiye, Christian Bagatin

== World, Continental & National Champions ==
2013
Italy U23 Road Race, Paolo Colonna
Italy Track (Omnium), Simone Consonni

2014
Italy U23 Time Trial, Davide Martinelli
Italy Track (Points race), Francesco Lamon

2015
Italy U23 Time Trial, Davide Martinelli

2016
World Track (Team pursuit), Filippo Ganna
Italy U23 Time Trial, Filippo Ganna
Ukraine U23 Time Trial, Mark Padun
Italy U23 Road Race, Simone Consonni
European U23 Track (Individual pursuit), Filippo Ganna
Italy Track (Points Race), Francesco Lamon
Italy Track (Omnium), Simone Consonni

2018
European U23 Track (Team pursuit), Francesco Lamon
Italy Track (Omnium), Francesco Lamon
Italy Track (Madison), Francesco Lamon

== Notable riders ==
- Giulio Ciccone (ITA) 2014–2015
- Paolo Colonna (ITA) 2012–2013
- Simone Consonni (ITA) 2013–2016
- Josh Edmondson (GBR) 2011–2012
- Iuri Filosi (ITA) 2014
- Stefano Locatelli (ITA) 2009–2012
- Davide Martinelli (ITA) 2014–2015
- Mark Padun (UKR) 2016–2017
- Nicola Ruffoni (ITA) 2012–2013
- Manuel Senni (ITA) 2011–2014
- Davide Villella (ITA) 2010–2013
- Edoardo Zardini (ITA) 2012
- Gianfranco Zilioli (ITA) 2011–2013
