= GP Laguna =

Croatian one-day road cycling race

Race details
- Date: February
- Region: Croatia
- Discipline: Road
- Type: One day race

History
- First edition: 2015
- Editions: 4 (as of 2018)
- First winner: Michael Gogl (AUT)
- Most wins: No repeat winners
- Most recent: Paolo Totò (ITA)

GP Laguna is a men's one-day cycle race which takes place in Croatia. It is rated by the UCI as a 1.2 event and forms part of the UCI Europe Tour.

== Winners ==
Year	Country	Rider	Team
2015	Austria	Michael Gogl	Team Felbermayr–Simplon Wels
2016	Italy	Filippo Ganna	Team Colpack
2017	Italy	Andrea Toniatti	Team Colpack
2018	Italy	Paolo Totò	Sangemini–MG.K Vis Vega
