= Andrea Toniatti =

Italian bicycle racer

Personal information
- Full name: Andrea Toniatti
- Born: 13 August 1992 (age 34) Rovereto, Italy

Cycling career
- Sport: Cycling
- Discipline: Road
- Role: Rider

Amateur teams
- 2011: Lucchini Maniva Ski
- 2012–2015: Zalf Euromobil
- 2016–2018: Team Colpack

Professional teams
- 2017: Bahrain–Merida (stagiaire)
- 2019: Team Colpack

Andrea Toniatti (born 13 August 1992 in Rovereto) is an Italian cyclist, who last rode for UCI Continental team Team Colpack.

== Major results ==
2009
2nd Overall Tre Ciclistica Bresciana

1st Stage 2

2010
9th Overall Giro della Lunigiana
10th Overall Tre Ciclistica Bresciana
2012
8th Circuito del Porto
2013
1st Ruota d'Oro
1st Stage 3 Giro della Valle d'Aosta
2nd Time trial, National Under-23 Road Championships
2014
1st Coppa Città di San Daniele
2nd Gran Premio di Poggiana
6th Piccolo Giro di Lombardia
6th Giro del Medio Brenta
9th Gran Premio della Liberazione
2015
4th Giro del Medio Brenta
10th Memorial Vincenzo Mantovani
2017
1st GP Laguna Porec
1st Trofeo Alcide Degasperi
7th Trofeo Città di Brescia
2018
3rd GP Laguna
5th Trofeo Alcide Degasperi
2019
3rd Trofeo Città di Brescia
