= Paolo Totò =

Italian cyclist

Personal information
- Full name: Paolo Totò
- Born: 22 January 1991 (age 35) Aosta, Italy
- Height: 1.83 m (6 ft 0 in)

Cycling career
- Sport: Cycling
- Discipline: Road
- Role: Rider

Amateur teams
- 2010: Club Corridonia
- 2011–2014: Veloclub Senigallia

Professional teams
- 2016–2019: Norda–MG.K Vis Vega
- 2020: Work Service–Dinatek–Vega
- 2021: Amore & Vita

Paolo Totò (born 22 January 1991) is an Italian cyclist, who last rode for UCI Continental team Amore & Vita. He also competes in para-cycling, acting as the pilot for Federico Andreoli at the 2024 Summer Paralympics.

== Major results ==
2009
5th Coppa Città di Offida
2012
2nd Memorial Elia Da Re
2013
8th Ruota d'Oro
2014
3rd Coppa della Pace
5th Trofeo Internazionale Bastianelli
2016
3rd Memorial Marco Pantani
2017
1st Stage 2 Tour of Albania
2nd GP Laguna
2nd Banja Luka–Belgrade II
4th Trofeo Alcide Degasperi
4th Trofeo Matteotti
7th GP Kranj
8th Gran Premio della Costa Etruschi
9th GP Industria & Artigianato di Larciano
9th GP Izola
9th GP Adria Mobil
9th Coppa della Pace
2018
1st GP Laguna
2nd Trofeo Laigueglia
3rd Overall Tour de Hongrie
4th Overall Tour of Albania

1st Points classification

4th GP Adria Mobil
7th Giro dell'Appennino
8th Overall Circuit des Ardennes
9th GP Izola
2019
2nd Overall Tour of Szeklerland

1st Points classification
1st Stage 3a (ITT)

2nd GP Slovenian Istria
2nd Gemenc Grand Prix I
2nd GP Kranj
4th GP Industria & Artigianato di Larciano
4th La Popolarissima
6th Gemenc Grand Prix II
7th Overall Giro del Friuli-Venezia Giulia
