= Ruota d'Oro =

Italian one-day road cycling race

Race details
- Date: September
- Region: Province of Arezzo
- Discipline: Road race
- Competition: UCI Europe Tour
- Type: Single day race
- Web site: www.gpruotadoro.it

History
- First edition: 1978
- Editions: 33 (as of 2026)
- First winner: Giuseppe Saronni (ITA)
- Most recent: Mattia Negrente (ITA)

The Ruota d'Oro is a professional one day cycling race held annually in Italy. It is part of UCI Europe Tour in category 1.2U. It was held as a stage race from 1978 to 1990.

== Winners ==
Year	Winner	Second	Third
1978	(Italy) Giuseppe Saronni	(Italy) Giovanni Battaglin	(Italy) Alfio Vandi
1979	(Italy) Francesco Moser	(Italy) Giuseppe Saronni	(Italy) Roberto Visentini
1980	(Italy) Gianbattista Baronchelli	(Italy) Silvano Contini	(Italy) Alfredo Chinetti
1981	(Norway) Knut Knudsen	(Italy) Francesco Moser	(West Germany) Gregor Braun
1982	(Sweden) Alf Segersäll	(Italy) Giuseppe Montella	(Italy) Luciano Rabottini
1983	(Italy) Roberto Visentini	(Italy) Emanuele Bombini	(Italy) Mario Beccia
1984	(Switzerland) Serge Demierre	(Italy) Emanuele Bombini	(Italy) Bruno Leali
1985	(Italy) Silvano Contini	(Italy) Pierino Gavazzi	(Spain) Iñaki Gastón
1986–1989	No race		
1990	(Italy) Maurizio Vandelli	(Italy) Pierino Gavazzi	(Italy) Andrea Tafi
1991–2001	No race		
2002	(Italy) Giairo Ermeti	(Russia) Aleksandr Baženov	(Italy) Giulio Tomi
2003	(Italy) Pasquale Muto	(Italy) Alex Gualandi	(Slovenia) Jure Zrimšek
2004	(Italy) Paolo Bailetti	(Italy) Rocco Capasso	(Italy) Marco Biceli
2005	(Belarus) Branislau Samoilau	(Italy) Alessio Signego	(Italy) Eros Capecchi
2006	(Russia) Sergey Kolesnikov	(Russia) Alexey Shchebelin	(Russia) Andrej Kljuev
2007	(Italy) Davide Bonuccelli	(Lithuania) Andris Buividas	(Italy) Henry Frusto
2008	(Luxembourg) Ben Gastauer	(Russia) Alexander Serebryakov	(Italy) Edoardo Girardi
2009	(Italy) Emanuele Moschen	(Italy) Alfredo Balloni	(Italy) Gianluca Brambilla
2010	(Italy) Francesco Bongiorno	(Italy) Matteo Trentin	(Italy) Gabriele Pizzaballa
2011	(Italy) Antonino Parrinello	(Italy) Carmelo Panto	(Italy) Devid Tintori
2012	(Italy) Mattia Cattaneo	(Russia) Vyacheslav Kuznetsov	(Italy) Andrea Fedi
2013	(Italy) Andrea Toniatti	(Italy) Luca Chirico	(Italy) Valerio Conti
2014	(Italy) Giacomo Berlato	(Russia) Roman Kustadinchev	(France) Jordan Sarrou
2015	(Italy) Simone Velasco	(Italy) Seid Lidze	(Moldova) Cristian Raileanu
2016	(Italy) Vincenzo Albanese	(Italy) Andrea Vendrame	(Italy) Michele Corradini
2017	(Argentina) Germán Tivani	(Italy) Filippo Rocchetti	(Italy) Luca Raggio
2018	(Italy) Samuele Zoccarato	(France) Clément Champoussin	(Italy) Filippo Rocchetti
2019	(Italy) Nicola Venchiarutti	(Italy) Samuele Zambelli	(Italy) Francesco Di Felice
2020	Cancelled due to the COVID-19 pandemic		
2021	(Italy) Andrea Piccolo	(Italy) Antonio Puppio	(Italy) Martin Marcellusi
2022	(France) Jordan Labrosse	(Denmark) Anders Foldager	(Italy) Alex Tolio
2023	(Belgium) Gil Gelders	(Venezuela) Francisco Peñuela	(Italy) Florian Kajamini
2024	Roman Ermakov	(South Africa) Travis Stedman	(Italy) Alessandro Pinarello
2025	(United Kingdom) Joseph Brookes	(Denmark) Alfred Grenaae	(France) Antoine L'Hote
2026	(Italy) Mattia Negrente	(France) Pierre Saint Martin	(Italy) Nicolo' Pizzi
