= 2017 UCI Europe Tour =

Road bicycle race series

- Thirteenth edition of the UCI Europe Tour

Details
- Dates: 26 January – 8 October 2017
- Location: Europe
- Races: 400

Champions
- Individual champion: Nacer Bouhanni (Cofidis)
- Teams' champion: Wanty–Groupe Gobert
- Nations' champion: France

The 2017 UCI Europe Tour was the thirteenth season of the UCI Europe Tour. The 2017 season began on 26 January 2017 with the Trofeo Santanyí-Ses Salines-Campos and ended on 17 October 2017 with the Nationale Sluitingsprijs.

Belgian rider Baptiste Planckaert (Wallonie-Bruxelles–Group Protect), who scored 1,605 points in the 2016 edition, was the defending champion of the UCI Europe Tour.

Nacer Bouhanni (Cofidis) won the overall standings for the second time in three years; Wanty–Groupe Gobert won the team classification, while France won both the overall nations' title and the under-23 equivalent.

== Race structure ==
Throughout the season, points are awarded to the top finishers of stages within stage races and the final general classification standings of each of the stages races and one-day events. The quality and complexity of a race also determines how many points are awarded to the top finishers, the higher the UCI rating of a race, the more points are awarded.

The UCI ratings from highest to lowest are as follows:

- Multi-day events: 2.HC, 2.1 and 2.2
- One-day events: 1.HC, 1.1 and 1.2

== Events ==
=== January ===
Date	Race name	Location	UCI Rating	Winner	Team	Ref
26 January	Trofeo Porreres, Felanitx, Ses Salines, Campos	Spain	1.1	André Greipel (GER)	Lotto–Soudal	
27 January	Trofeo Serra de Tramuntana	Spain	1.1	Tim Wellens (BEL)	Lotto–Soudal	
28 January	Trofeo Andratx-Mirador des Colomer	Spain	1.1	Tim Wellens (BEL)	Lotto–Soudal	
29 January	Trofeo Palma	Spain	1.1	Daniel McLay (GBR)	Fortuneo–Vital Concept	
29 January	GP Cycliste la Marseillaise	France	1.1	Arthur Vichot (FRA)	FDJ	

=== February ===
Date	Race name	Location	UCI Rating	Winner	Team	Ref
1–5 February	Volta a la Comunitat Valenciana	Spain	2.1	Nairo Quintana (COL)	Movistar Team	
1–5 February	Étoile de Bessèges	France	2.1	Lilian Calmejane (FRA)	Direct Énergie	
5 February	Gran Premio della Costa Etruschi	Italy	1.1	Diego Ulissi (ITA)	UAE Abu Dhabi	
11 February	Vuelta a Murcia	Spain	1.1	Alejandro Valverde (ESP)	Movistar Team	
12 February	Clásica de Almería	Spain	1.1	Magnus Cort (DEN)	Orica–Scott	
12 February	Trofeo Laigueglia	Italy	1.HC	Fabio Felline (ITA)	Italy (national team)	
15–19 February	Vuelta a Andalucía	Spain	2.HC	Alejandro Valverde (ESP)	Movistar Team	
15–19 February	Volta ao Algarve	Portugal	2.HC	Primož Roglič (SLO)	LottoNL–Jumbo	
18–19 February	Tour du Haut Var	France	2.1	Arthur Vichot (FRA)	FDJ	
19 February	GP Laguna	Croatia	1.2	Andrea Toniatti (ITA)	Team Colpack	
21–23 February	Tour La Provence	France	2.1	Rohan Dennis (AUS)	BMC Racing Team	
22–26 February	Volta ao Alentejo	Portugal	2.1	Carlos Barbero (ESP)	Movistar Team	
25 February	Classic Sud-Ardèche	France	1.1	Mauro Finetto (ITA)	Delko–Marseille Provence KTM	
26 February	Kuurne–Brussels–Kuurne	Belgium	1.HC	Peter Sagan (SVK)	Bora–Hansgrohe	
26 February	Royal Bernard Drôme Classic	France	1.1	Sébastien Delfosse (BEL)	WB Veranclassic Aqua Protect	
26 February	GP Izola	Slovenia	1.2	Filippo Fortin (ITA)	Tirol Cycling Team	

=== March ===
Date	Race name	Location	UCI Rating	Winner	Team	Ref
1 March	Le Samyn	Belgium	1.1	Guillaume Van Keirsbulck (BEL)	Wanty–Groupe Gobert	
1 March	Trofej Umag	Croatia	1.2	Rok Korošec (SLO)	Amplatz–BMC	
4 March	Poreč Trophy	Croatia	1.2	Matej Mugerli (SLO)	Amplatz–BMC	
5 March	Clássica da Arrábida	Portugal	1.2	Amaro Antunes (POR)	W52 / FC Porto / Mestre da Cor	
5 March	Dwars door West-Vlaanderen	Belgium	1.1	Jos van Emden (NED)	LottoNL–Jumbo	
5 March	GP Industria & Artigianato di Larciano	Italy	1.HC	Adam Yates (GBR)	Orica–Scott	
5 March	Grand Prix de la Ville de Lillers	France	1.2	Thomas Boudat (FRA)	Direct Énergie	
5 March	International Rhodes Grand Prix	Greece	1.2	Alan Banaszek (POL)	Poland (national team)	
9–12 March	Istrian Spring Trophy	Croatia	2.2	Matej Mugerli (SLO)	Amplatz–BMC	
10–12 March	Tour of Rhodes	Greece	2.2	Colin Stüssi (SUI)	Roth–Akros	
11 March	Ronde van Drenthe	Netherlands	1.1	Jan-Willem van Schip (NED)	Delta Cycling Rotterdam	
12 March	Clássica Aldeias do Xisto	Portugal	1.2	Vicente García de Mateos (ESP)	Louletano–Hospital de Loulé	
12 March	Dorpenomloop Rucphen	Netherlands	1.2	Maarten van Trijp (NED)	Metec–TKH	
12 March	Paris–Troyes	France	1.2	Yannis Yssaad (FRA)	Armée de Terre	
15 March	Nokere Koerse	Belgium	1.HC	Nacer Bouhanni (FRA)	Cofidis	
17 March	Handzame Classic	Belgium	1.1	Kristoffer Halvorsen (NOR)	Joker Icopal	
18 March	Classic Loire Atlantique	France	1.1	Laurent Pichon (FRA)	Fortuneo–Vital Concept	
19 March	La Popolarissima	Italy	1.2	Filippo Calderaro (ITA)	Zalf Euromobil Désirée Fior	
20–26 March	Tour de Normandie	France	2.2	Anthony Delaplace (FRA)	Fortuneo–Vital Concept	
23–26 March	Settimana Internazionale di Coppi e Bartali	Italy	2.1	Lilian Calmejane (FRA)	Direct Énergie	
26 March	Ghent–Wevelgem U23	Belgium	1.ncup	Jacob Hennessy (GBR)	Great Britain (national team)	
28–30 March	Three Days of De Panne	Belgium	2.HC	Philippe Gilbert (BEL)	Quick-Step Floors	
31 March–2 April	Triptyque des Monts et Châteaux	Belgium	2.2	Jasper Philipsen (BEL)	BMC Development Team	
31 March	Route Adélie	France	1.1	Laurent Pichon (FRA)	Fortuneo–Vital Concept	

=== April ===
Date	Race name	Location	UCI Rating	Winner	Team	Ref
1 April	GP Miguel Induráin	Spain	1.1	Simon Yates (GBR)	Orica–Scott	
1 April	Volta Limburg Classic	Netherlands	1.1	Marco Canola (ITA)	Nippo–Vini Fantini	
2 April	GP Adria Mobil	Slovenia	1.2	Antonino Parrinello (ITA)	GM Europa Ovini	
2 April	Trofeo PIVA	Italy	1.2U	Mark Padun (UKR)	Team Colpack	
2 April	La Roue Tourangelle	France	1.1	Flavien Dassonville (FRA)	HP BTP–Auber93	
2 April	Vuelta a La Rioja	Spain	1.1	Rory Sutherland (AUS)	Movistar Team	
4–7 April	Circuit de la Sarthe	France	2.1	Lilian Calmejane (FRA)	Direct Énergie	
5 April	Scheldeprijs	Belgium	1.HC	Marcel Kittel (GER)	Quick-Step Floors	
7–9 April	Circuit des Ardennes	France	2.2	Jhonatan Narváez (ECU)	Axeon–Hagens Berman	
8 April	Trofeo Edil C	Italy	1.2	Marco Negrente (ITA)	Team Colpack	
8 April	Ronde van Vlaanderen U23	Belgium	1.ncup	Eddie Dunbar (IRL)	Republic of Ireland (national team)	
9 April	Giro dell'Appennino	Italy	1.1	Danilo Celano (ITA)	Amore & Vita–Selle SMP	
9 April	Klasika Primavera	Spain	1.1	Gorka Izagirre (ESP)	Movistar Team	
11 April	Paris–Camembert	France	1.1	Nacer Bouhanni (FRA)	Cofidis	
12–16 April	Tour du Loir-et-Cher	France	2.2	Alexander Kamp (DEN)	Team VéloCONCEPT	
12 April	Brabantse Pijl	Belgium	1.HC	Sonny Colbrelli (ITA)	Bahrain–Merida	
13 April	Grand Prix de Denain	France	1.HC	Arnaud Démare (FRA)	FDJ	
14–15 April	ZLM Tour	Netherlands	2.ncup	Chris Lawless (GBR)	Great Britain (national team)	
15 April	Liège–Bastogne–Liège Espoirs	Belgium	1.2U	Bjorg Lambrecht (BEL)	Lotto–Soudal U23	
15 April	Tour du Finistère	France	1.1	Julien Loubet (FRA)	Armée de Terre	
17 April	Giro del Belvedere	Italy	1.2U	Alexandr Riabushenko (BLR)	Team Palazzago	
17 April	Tro-Bro Léon	France	1.1	Damien Gaudin (FRA)	Armée de Terre	
17–21 April	Tour of the Alps	Italy	2.HC	Geraint Thomas (GBR)	Team Sky	
18 April	Gran Premio Palio del Recioto	Italy	1.2U	Neilson Powless (USA)	Axeon–Hagens Berman	
18–23 April	Tour of Croatia	Croatia	2.1	Vincenzo Nibali (ITA)	Bahrain–Merida	
20–23 April	Tour of Mersin	Turkey	2.2	Stanislau Bazhkou (BLR)	Minsk Cycling Club	
22 April	Kerékpárverseny	Hungary	1.2	Kamil Zieliński (POL)	Domin Sport	
22 April	Arno Wallaard Memorial	Netherlands	1.2	Timothy Stevens (BEL)	Pauwels Sauzen–Vastgoedservice	
23 April	Trofeo Città di San Vendemiano	Italy	1.2U	Nicola Conci (ITA)	Zalf Euromobil Désirée Fior	
23 April	GP Slovakia	Slovakia	1.2	Alois Kaňkovský (CZE)	Elkov–Author	
23 April	Rutland–Melton International CiCLE Classic	United Kingdom	1.2	Daniel Fleeman (GBR)	Metaltek–Kuota	
25 April–1 May	Tour de Bretagne Cycliste	France	2.2	Flavien Dassonville (FRA)	HP BTP–Auber93	
25 April	Gran Premio della Liberazione	Italy	1.2U	Seid Lizde (ITA)	Team Colpack	
28–30 April	Tour de Yorkshire	United Kingdom	2.1	Serge Pauwels (BEL)	Team Dimension Data	
28–29 April	Toscana-Terra di Ciclismo	Italy	2.2U	Jai Hindley (AUS)	Australia (national team)	
28 April	Himmerland Rundt	Denmark	1.2	Nicolai Brøchner (DEN)	Riwal Platform	
29 April	GP Viborg	Denmark	1.2	Kasper Asgreen (DEN)	Team VéloCONCEPT	
29 April	Belgrade Banjaluka I	Serbia	1.2	Barnabás Peák (HUN)	Kontent–DKSI	
29 April	ZODC Zuidenveld Tour	Netherlands	1.2	Rick Ottema (NED)	Baby-Dump Cyclingteam	
29 April–2 May	Carpathian Couriers Race	Poland	2.2U	Alessandro Pessot (ITA)	Cycling Team Friuli	
29 April–1 May	Vuelta a Asturias	Spain	2.1	Raúl Alarcón (ESP)	W52 / FC Porto / Mestre da Cor	
30 April	Paris–Mantes-en-Yvelines	France	1.2	Fabien Canal (FRA)	Armée de Terre	
30 April	Belgrade Banjaluka II	Bosnia and Herzegovina	1.2	Nicola Gaffurini (ITA)	Sangemini–MG.K Vis	
30 April	Skive–Løbet	Denmark	1.2	Martin Toft Madsen (DEN)	BHS–Almeborg Bornholm	

=== May ===
Date	Race name	Location	UCI Rating	Winner	Team	Ref
1 May	Circuit de Wallonie	Belgium	1.2	Maarten van Trijp (NED)	Metec–TKH	
1 May	Memoriał Andrzeja Trochanowskiego	Poland	1.2	Alois Kaňkovský (CZE)	Elkov–Author	
1 May	Rund um den Finanzplatz Eschborn–Frankfurt (U23)	Germany	1.2U	Fabio Jakobsen (NED)	SEG Racing Academy	
2 May	Memoriał Romana Siemińskiego	Poland	1.2	Alois Kaňkovský (CZE)	Elkov–Author	
3–6 May	Rhône-Alpes Isère Tour	France	2.2	Marco Minnaard (NED)	Wanty–Groupe Gobert	
3–7 May	Tour d'Azerbaïdjan	Azerbaijan	2.1	Kirill Pozdnyakov (AZE)	Synergy Baku	
5–7 May	CCC Tour – Grody Piastowskie	Poland	2.2	Marek Rutkiewicz (POL)	Wibatech 7R Fuji	
5–7 May	Vuelta a la Comunidad de Madrid	Spain	2.1	Óscar Sevilla (ESP)	Medellín–Inder	
5–9 May	Five Rings of Moscow	Russia	2.2	Yuri Trofimov (RUS)	Russia (national team)	
6 May	Ronde van Overijssel	Netherlands	1.2	Nicolai Brøchner (DEN)	Riwal Platform	
6 May	Sundvolden GP	Norway	1.2	Rasmus Guldhammer (DEN)	Team VéloCONCEPT	
7 May	Ringerike GP	Norway	1.2	Rasmus Guldhammer (DEN)	Team VéloCONCEPT	
7 May	Circuito del Porto – Trofeo Arvedi	Italy	1.2	Imerio Cima (ITA)	Viris Maserati	
7 May	Gran Premio Citta di Lugano	Switzerland	1.HC	Iuri Filosi (ITA)	Nippo–Vini Fantini	
7 May	Flèche Ardennaise	Belgium	1.2	Harm Vanhoucke (BEL)	Lotto–Soudal U23	
9–14 May	4 Jours de Dunkerque	France	2.HC	Clément Venturini (FRA)	Cofidis	
11–14 May	Tour of Ankara	Turkey	2.2	Brayan Ramírez (COL)	Medellín–Inder	
13 May	Scandinavian Race Uppsala	Sweden	1.2	Nicolai Brøchner (DEN)	Riwal Platform	
14 May	71e Profronde van Noord-Holland	Netherlands	1.2	Fabio Jakobsen (NED)	SEG Racing Academy	
14 May	Grand Prix Criquielion	Belgium	1.2	Bram Welten (NED)	BMC Development Team	
14 May	Gran Premio Industrie del Marmo	Italy	1.2U	Michael Storer (AUS)	Australia (national team)	
17–21 May	Tour of Norway	Norway	2.HC	Edvald Boasson Hagen (NOR)	Team Dimension Data	
17–21 May	Tour of Ukraine	Ukraine	2.2	Vitaliy Buts (UKR)	Kolss Cycling Team	
17–21 May	Bałtyk–Karkonosze Tour	Poland	2.2	Marek Rutkiewicz (POL)	Wibatech 7R Fuji	
18–21 May	Ronde de l'Isard	France	2.2U	Pavel Sivakov (RUS)	BMC Development Team	
19–21 May	A Travers Les Hauts de France – Trophee Paris–Arras Tour	France	2.2	Jordan Levasseur (FRA)	Armée de Terre	
19–21 May	Vuelta a Castilla y León	Spain	2.1	Jonathan Hivert (FRA)	Direct Énergie	
20–24 May	74th Tour of Albania	Albania	2.2	Francesco Manuel Bongiorno (ITA)	Sangemini–MG.K Vis	
20 May	Berner Rundfahrt / Tour de Berne	Switzerland	1.2	Filippo Fortin (ITA)	Tirol Cycling Team	
21–28 May	An Post Rás	Ireland	2.2	James Gullen (GBR)	JLT–Condor	
21 May	Grand Prix de la Somme	France	1.1	Adrien Petit (FRA)	Direct Énergie	
24–28 May	Flèche du Sud	Luxembourg	2.2	Matija Kvasina (CRO)	Team Felbermayr–Simplon Wels	
24–28 May	Baloise Belgium Tour	Belgium	2.HC	Jens Keukeleire (BEL)	Belgium (national team)	
24–28 May	Tour des Fjords	Norway	2.1	Edvald Boasson Hagen (NOR)	Team Dimension Data	
25–27 May	Gemenc Grand Prix	Hungary	2.2	Filippo Tagliani (ITA)	Gallina–Colosio–Eurofeed	
26–27 May	Tour of Estonia	Estonia	2.1	Karl Patrick Lauk (EST)	Estonia (national team)	
26 May	Horizon Park Race for Peace	Ukraine	1.2	Mykhaylo Kononenko (UKR)	Kolss Cycling Team	
27–28 May	Tour de Gironde Cycliste International	France	2.2	Pablo Torres (ESP)	Burgos BH	
27–28 May	Tour du Jura Cycliste	France	2.2	Thomas Degand (BEL)	Wanty–Groupe Gobert	
27 May	Grand Prix de Plumelec-Morbihan	France	1.1	Alexis Vuillermoz (FRA)	AG2R La Mondiale	
27 May	Horizon Park Race Maidan	Ukraine	1.2	Rasmus Esmann Ginnerup (DEN)	Team Aura Energi–CK Aarhus	
28 May	Boucles de l'Aulne – Châteaulin	France	1.1	Odd Christian Eiking (NOR)	FDJ	
28 May	Horizon Park Race Classic	Ukraine	1.2	Oleksandr Prevar (UKR)	Kolss Cycling Team	
28 May	Paris–Roubaix Espoirs	France	1.2U	Nils Eekhoff (NED)	Development Team Sunweb	
31 May – 4 June	Skoda-Tour de Luxembourg	Luxembourg	2.HC	Greg Van Avermaet (BEL)	BMC Racing Team	

=== June ===
Date	Race name	Location	UCI Rating	Winner	Team	Ref
1–4 June	Grand Prix Priessnitz spa	Czech Republic	2.Ncup	Bjorg Lambrecht (BEL)	Belgium (national team)	
1–4 June	Szlakiem Walk Majora Hubala	Poland	2.1	Maciej Paterski (POL)	CCC–Sprandi–Polkowice	
1–4 June	Boucles de la Mayenne	France	2.1	Mathieu van der Poel (NED)	Beobank–Corendon	
1–4 June	GP Beiras e Serra da Estrela	Portugal	2.1	Jesús del Pino (ESP)	Efapel	
2–4 June	Hammer Sportzone Limburg	Netherlands	2.1	Team event Ian Boswell (USA); Jonathan Dibben (GBR); Owain Doull (GBR); Tao Geoghegan Hart (GBR); Danny van Poppel (NED); Elia Viviani (ITA)	Team Sky	
2–4 June	Tour of Bihor-Bellotto	Romania	2.2	Rodolfo Torres (COL)	Androni–Sidermec–Bottecchia	
2 June	Trofeo Alcide Degasperi	Italy	1.2	Andrea Toniatti (ITA)	Team Colpack	
3 June	Heistse Pijl	Belgium	1.1	Jasper De Buyst (BEL)	Lotto–Soudal	
4 June	Coppa della Pace – Trofeo Fratelli Anelli	Italy	1.2	Nicola Gaffurini (ITA)	Sangemini–MG.K Vis	
4 June	Memorial Philippe Van Coningsloo	Belgium	1.2	Yves Coolen (BEL)	Home Solution–Anmapa–Soenens	
7–11 June	Tour de Slovaquie	Slovakia	2.1	Jan Tratnik (SLO)	CCC–Sprandi–Polkowice	
8–11 June	Oberösterreichrundfahrt	Austria	2.2	Stephan Rabitsch (AUT)	Team Felbermayr–Simplon Wels	
8–11 June	Ronde de l'Oise	France	2.2	Flavien Dassonville (FRA)	HP BTP–Auber93	
8 June	GP du canton d'Argovie	Switzerland	1.HC	Sacha Modolo (ITA)	UAE Team Emirates	
9–11 June	Tour of Małopolska	Poland	2.2	Maciej Paterski (POL)	CCC–Sprandi–Polkowice	
9–15 June	Giro Ciclistico d'Italia	Italy	2.2U	Pavel Sivakov (RUS)	BMC Development Team	
10 June	Dwars door de Vlaamse Ardennen	Belgium	1.2	Cameron Meyer (AUS)	Australia (national team)	
10 June	Fyen Rundt	Denmark	1.2	Audun Fløtten (NOR)	Uno-X Hydrogen Development Team	
11 June	Ronde van Limburg	Belgium	1.1	Wout van Aert (BEL)	Vérandas Willems–Crelan	
11 June	Rund um Köln	Germany	1.1	Gregor Mühlberger (AUT)	Bora–Hansgrohe	
11 June	GP Horsens Posten	Denmark	1.2	Casper Pedersen (DEN)	Team Giant–Castelli	
14–18 June	Ster ZLM Toer GP Jan van Heeswijk	Netherlands	2.1	José Gonçalves (POR)	Team Katusha–Alpecin	
15–18 June	Route du Sud – La Dépêche du Midi	France	2.1	Silvan Dillier (SUI)	BMC Racing Team	
15–18 June	Tour de Slovénie	Slovenia	2.1	Rafał Majka (POL)	Bora–Hansgrohe	
15–18 June	Tour de Savoie Mont Blanc	France	2.2	Egan Bernal (COL)	Androni–Sidermec–Bottecchia	
16–18 June	Tour de Serbia	Serbia	2.2	Charalampos Kastrantas (GRE)	Dare Viator Partizan	
17 June	Grand Prix Doliny Baryczy Memoriał Grundmanna i Wizowskiego	Poland	1.2	Alan Banaszek (POL)	CCC–Sprandi–Polkowice	
18 June	Bruges Cycling Classic	Belgium	1.1	Wout van Aert (BEL)	Vérandas Willems–Crelan	
18 June	Beaumont Trophy	United Kingdom	1.2	Peter Williams (GBR)	ONE Pro Cycling	
18 June	The International Race Korona Kocich Gór	Poland	1.2	Łukasz Owsian (POL)	CCC–Sprandi–Polkowice	
21 June	Halle–Ingooigem	Belgium	1.1	Arnaud Démare (FRA)	FDJ	
27 June–2 July	Tour de Hongrie	Hungary	2.2	Daniel Jaramillo (COL)	UnitedHealthcare	
27 June	Trofeo Città di Brescia	Italy	1.2	Nikolai Shumov (BLR)	Gallina–Colosio–Eurofeed	
28 June–1 July	Course Cycliste de Solidarność et des Champions Olympiques	Poland	2.2	Mateusz Komar (POL)	Voster Uniwheels Team	
28 June	Internationale Wielertrofee Jong Maar Moedig	Belgium	1.2	Toon Aerts (BEL)	Telenet–Fidea Lions	
29 June–2 July	Volta a Portugal do Futuro	Portugal	2.2U	José Fernandes (POR)	Liberty Seguros–Carglass	

=== July ===
Date	Race name	Location	UCI Rating	Winner	Team	Ref
1 July	Omloop Het Nieuwsblad U23	Belgium	1.2	Tanguy Turgis (FRA)	BMC Development Team	
2 July	Slag om Norg	Netherlands	1.1	Gianni Vermeersch (BEL)	Beobank–Corendon	
2–8 July	Tour of Austria	Austria	2.1	Stefan Denifl (AUT)	Aqua Blue Sport	
5–9 July	Troféu Joaquim Agostinho	Portugal	2.2	Amaro Antunes (POR)	W52 / FC Porto / Mestre da Cor	
5–9 July	Sibiu Cycling Tour	Romania	2.1	Egan Bernal (COL)	Androni–Sidermec–Bottecchia	
7 July	Grote Prijs Stad Sint-Niklaas	Belgium	1.2	Gerben Thijssen (BEL)	Lotto–Soudal U23	
7 July	Minsk Cup	Belarus	1.2	Yegor Dementyev (UKR)	ISD–Jorbi	
8 July	Grand Prix Minsk	Belarus	1.2	Yauheni Karaliok (BLR)	Minsk Cycling Club	
8 July	Grote Prijs Jean-Pierre Monseré	Belgium	1.1	Laurens Sweeck (BEL)	ERA–Circus	
9 July	Giro del Medio Brenta	Italy	1.2	Michele Gazzara (ITA)	Sangemini–MG.K Vis	
9 July	Velothon Wales	United Kingdom	1.1	Ian Bibby (GBR)	JLT–Condor	
9 July	Midden–Brabant Poort Omloop	Netherlands	1.2	Jaap Kooijman (NED)	LottoNL–Jumbo–De Jonge Renner	
12–16 July	Giro della Valle d'Aosta	Italy	2.2U	Pavel Sivakov (RUS)	BMC Development Team	
16 July	Trofeo Matteotti	Italy	1.1	Sergey Shilov (RUS)	Lokosphinx	
19 July	Grand Prix Pino Cerami	Belgium	1.1	Wout van Aert (BEL)	Vérandas Willems–Crelan	
22–26 July	Tour de Wallonie	Belgium	2.HC	Dylan Teuns (BEL)	BMC Racing Team	
23 July	Grand Prix de la ville de Pérenchies	France	1.2	Roy Jans (BEL)	WB Veranclassic Aqua Protect	
25 July	Prueba Villafranca de Ordizia	Spain	1.1	Sergey Shilov (RUS)	Lokosphinx	
26–29 July	Dookoła Mazowsza	Poland	2.2	Alois Kaňkovský (CZE)	Elkov–Author	
26–30 July	Tour Alsace	France	2.2	Lucas Hamilton (AUS)	Australia (national team)	
29–31 July	Kreiz Breizh Elites	France	2.2	Jonas Gregaard Wilsly (DEN)	Riwal Platform	
30 July	GP Kranj	Slovenia	1.2	Matej Mugerli (SLO)	Amplatz–BMC	
30 July	Polynormande	France	1.1	Alexis Gougeard (FRA)	AG2R La Mondiale	
30 July	Rad am Ring	Germany	1.1	Huub Duyn (NED)	Vérandas Willems–Crelan	
31 July	Circuito de Getxo	Spain	1.1	Carlos Barbero (ESP)	Movistar Team	

=== August ===
Date	Race name	Location	UCI Rating	Winner	Team	Ref
1–5 August	Vuelta a Burgos	Spain	2.HC	Mikel Landa (ESP)	Team Sky	
4–15 August	Volta a Portugal	Portugal	2.1	Raúl Alarcón (ESP)	W52 / FC Porto / Mestre da Cor	
5 August	Dwars door het Hageland	Belgium	1.1	Mathieu van der Poel (NED)	Beobank–Corendon	
5 August	Kalmar Grand Prix	Sweden	1.2	Rasmus Bøgh Wallin (DEN)	Team ColoQuick–Cult	
5 August	Tour de Ribas	Ukraine	1.2	Sergiy Lagkuti (UKR)	Kolss Cycling Team	
6 August	Antwerpse Havenpijl	Belgium	1.2	Arvid de Kleijn (NED)	Baby-Dump Cyclingteam	
6 August	Odessa Grand Prix	Ukraine	1.2	Mykhaylo Kononenko (UKR)	Kolss Cycling Team	
8–12 August	Tour de l'Ain	France	2.1	Thibaut Pinot (FRA)	FDJ	
10–12 August	Tour of Szeklerland	Romania	2.2	Patrick Bosman (AUT)	Hrinkow Advarics Cycleang	
10–13 August	Arctic Race of Norway	Norway	2.HC	Dylan Teuns (BEL)	BMC Racing Team	
10–13 August	Czech Cycling Tour	Czech Republic	2.1	Josef Černý (CZE)	Elkov–Author	
12 August	Memoriał Henryka Łasaka	Poland	1.2	Alan Banaszek (POL)	CCC–Sprandi–Polkowice	
13 August	Coupe des Carpathes	Poland	1.2	Maciej Paterski (POL)	CCC–Sprandi–Polkowice	
13 August	Gran Premio di Poggiana	Italy	1.2U	Nicola Conci (ITA)	Zalf Euromobil Désirée Fior	
15–18 August	Tour du Limousin	France	2.1	Alexis Vuillermoz (FRA)	AG2R La Mondiale	
16 August	GP Capodarco	Italy	1.2U	Mark Padun (UKR)	Team Colpack	
18 August	Arnhem–Veenendaal Classic	Netherlands	1.1	Luka Mezgec (SLO)	Orica–Scott	
19 August	Puchar Ministra Obrony Narodowej	Poland	1.2	Alois Kaňkovský (CZE)	Elkov–Author	
20 August	Grote Prijs Jef Scherens	Belgium	1.1	Timothy Dupont (BEL)	Vérandas Willems–Crelan	
20 August	Szlakiem Wielkich Jezior	Poland	1.2	Marek Rutkiewicz (POL)	Wibatech 7R Fuji	
22 August	Grote Prijs Stad Zottegem	Belgium	1.1	Jasper De Buyst (BEL)	Lotto–Soudal	
22 August	Grand Prix des Marbriers	France	1.2	Karol Domagalski (POL)	ONE Pro Cycling	
22–25 August	Tour du Poitou-Charentes	France	2.1	Mads Pedersen (DEN)	Trek–Segafredo	
23 August	Druivenkoers Overijse	Belgium	1.1	Jérôme Baugnies (BEL)	Wanty–Groupe Gobert	
23–27 August	Baltic Chain Tour	Estonia	2.2	Herman Dahl (NOR)	Team Sparebanken Sør	
25 August	Pro Ötztaler 5500	Austria	1.1	Roman Kreuziger (CZE)	Orica–Scott	
26 August	Omloop Mandel-Leie-Schelde	Belgium	1.1	Iljo Keisse (BEL)	Quick-Step Floors	
26–27 August	Ronde van Midden-Nederland	Netherlands	2.2	Kamil Gradek (POL)	ONE Pro Cycling	
27 August	Schaal Sels	Belgium	1.1	Taco van der Hoorn (NED)	Roompot–Nederlandse Loterij	
27 August	Croatia–Slovenia	Slovenia	1.2	Dušan Rajović (SRB)	Adria Mobil	
30 August–3 September	Okolo Jižních Čech	Czech Republic	2.2	Josef Černý (CZE)	Elkov–Author	

=== September ===
Date	Race name	Location	UCI Rating	Winner	Team	Ref
2 September	Brussels Cycling Classic	Belgium	1.HC	Arnaud Démare (FRA)	FDJ	
3–5 September	Tour of Bulgaria – North	Bulgaria	2.2	Sergiy Lagkuti (UKR)	Kolss Cycling Team	
3–10 September	Tour of Britain	United Kingdom	2.HC	Lars Boom (NED)	LottoNL–Jumbo	
3 September	Grand Prix de Fourmies	France	1.HC	Nacer Bouhanni (FRA)	Cofidis	
3 September	Kernen Omloop Echt-Susteren	Netherlands	1.2	Robbert de Greef (NED)	Baby-Dump Cyclingteam	
5–10 September	Olympia's Tour	Netherlands	2.2U	Pascal Eenkhoorn (NED)	BMC Development Team	
7–9 September	Tour of Bulgaria – South	Bulgaria	2.2	Vitaliy Buts (UKR)	Kolss Cycling Team	
8–9 September	East Bohemia Tour	Czech Republic	2.2	Kamil Zieliński (POL)	Domin Sport	
9 September	Tour du Jura	Switzerland	1.2	Marc Hirschi (SUI)	Switzerland (national team)	
9 September	De Kustpijl	Belgium	1.2	Christophe Noppe (BEL)	Sport Vlaanderen–Baloise	
10 September	Grand Prix Judendorf-Straßengel	Austria	1.2	Adam de Vos (CAN)	Rally Cycling	
10 September	Tour du Doubs	France	1.1	Romain Hardy (FRA)	Fortuneo–Oscaro	
10 September	Grand Prix de la ville de Nogent-sur-Oise	France	1.2	Jordan Levasseur (FRA)	Armée de Terre	
11 September	Grote Prijs Marcel Kint	Belgium	1.2	Jonas Rickaert (BEL)	Sport Vlaanderen–Baloise	
12–16 September	Danmark Rundt	Denmark	2.HC	Mads Pedersen (DEN)	Trek–Segafredo	
13 September	Coppa Ugo Agostoni	Italy	1.1	Michael Albasini (SUI)	Switzerland (national team)	
13 September	Grand Prix de Wallonie	Belgium	1.1	Tim Wellens (BEL)	Lotto–Soudal	
14 September	Coppa Bernocchi	Italy	1.1	Sonny Colbrelli (ITA)	Bahrain–Merida	
15 September	Kampioenschap van Vlaanderen	Belgium	1.1	Fernando Gaviria (COL)	Quick-Step Floors	
16 September	Primus Classic	Belgium	1.HC	Matteo Trentin (ITA)	Quick-Step Floors	
16 September	GP Czech Republic	Czech Republic	1.2	Rok Korošec (SLO)	Amplatz–BMC	
16 September	Memorial Marco Pantani	Italy	1.1	Marco Zamparella (ITA)	Amore & Vita–Selle SMP	
17 September	Grand Prix d'Isbergues	France	1.1	Benoît Cosnefroy (FRA)	AG2R La Mondiale	
17 September	GP Poland	Poland	1.2	Kamil Zieliński (POL)	Domin Sport	
20 September	Omloop van het Houtland	Belgium	1.1	Tom Devriendt (BEL)	Wanty–Groupe Gobert	
23–24 September	Tour du Gévaudan Languedoc-Roussillon	France	2.2	Guillaume Martin (FRA)	Wanty–Groupe Gobert	
24 September	Gooikse Pijl	Belgium	1.2	Kenny Dehaes (BEL)	Wanty–Groupe Gobert	
24 September	Paris–Chauny	France	1.2	Thomas Boudat (FRA)	Direct Énergie	
24 September	Duo Normand	France	1.1	Anthony Delaplace (FRA); Pierre-Luc Périchon (FRA)	Fortuneo–Oscaro	
26–27 September	Giro della Toscana	Italy	2.1	Guillaume Martin (FRA)	Wanty–Groupe Gobert	
26 September	Ruota d'Oro	Italy	1.2U	Germán Tivani (ARG)	Unieuro Trevigiani–Hemus 1896	
28 September	Coppa Sabatini	Italy	1.1	Andrea Pasqualon (ITA)	Wanty–Groupe Gobert	
30 September	Memorial Imre Riczu	Hungary	1.2	Alberto Giuriato (ITA)	Cycling Team Friuli	
30 September	Omloop Eurometropool	Belgium	1.1	André Greipel (GER)	Lotto–Soudal	
30 September	Giro dell'Emilia	Italy	1.HC	Giovanni Visconti (ITA)	Bahrain–Merida	

=== October ===
Date	Race name	Location	UCI Rating	Winner	Team	Ref
1 October	Piccolo Giro di Lombardia	Italy	1.2U	Alexandr Riabushenko (BLR)	Team Palazzago	
1 October	Tour de Vendée	France	1.1	Christophe Laporte (FRA)	Cofidis	
1 October	Gran Premio Bruno Beghelli	Italy	1.HC	Luis León Sánchez (ESP)	Astana	
1 October	Tour de l'Eurométropole	Belgium	1.HC	Daniel McLay (GBR)	Fortuneo–Oscaro	
3 October	Binche–Chimay–Binche	Belgium	1.1	Jasper De Buyst (BEL)	Lotto–Soudal	
3 October	Tre Valli Varesine	Italy	1.HC	Alexandre Geniez (FRA)	AG2R La Mondiale	
3 October	Sparkassen Münsterland Giro	Germany	1.HC	Sam Bennett (IRL)	Bora–Hansgrohe	
5 October	Milano–Torino	Italy	1.HC	Rigoberto Urán (COL)	Cannondale–Drapac	
5 October	Paris–Bourges	France	1.1	Rudy Barbier (FRA)	AG2R La Mondiale	
8 October	Paris–Tours	France	1.HC	Matteo Trentin (ITA)	Quick-Step Floors	
8 October	Paris–Tours Espoirs	France	1.2U	Jasper Philipsen (BEL)	BMC Development Team	
11 October	Famenne Ardenne Classic	Belgium	1.1	Moreno Hofland (NED)	Lotto–Soudal	
14 October	Tacx Pro Classic	Netherlands	1.1	Timo Roosen (NED)	LottoNL–Jumbo	
15 October	Chrono des Nations	France	1.1	Martin Toft Madsen (DEN)	BHS–Almeborg Bornholm	
15 October	Chrono des Nations (U23)	France	1.2U	Mathias Norsgaard (DEN)	Team Giant–Castelli	
17 October	Nationale Sluitingsprijs	Belgium	1.1	Arvid de Kleijn (NED)	Baby-Dump Cyclingteam	

== Final standings ==
For the 2017 season, the standings are calculated based upon the UCI World Ranking, with the ranking period being the previous 52 weeks.

=== Individual classification ===
Rank	Name	Team	Points
1	Nacer Bouhanni (FRA)	Cofidis	1124
2	Jasper De Buyst (BEL)	Lotto–Soudal	935
3	André Greipel (GER)	Lotto–Soudal	886
4	Elia Viviani (ITA)	Team Sky	813
5	Egan Bernal (COL)	Androni–Sidermec–Bottecchia	800
6	Arnaud Démare (FRA)	FDJ	762
7	Thibaut Pinot (FRA)	FDJ	761
8	Mattia Cattaneo (ITA)	Androni–Sidermec–Bottecchia	731
9	Kenny Dehaes (BEL)	Wanty–Groupe Gobert	706
10	Matteo Trentin (ITA)	Quick-Step Floors	700

=== Teams classification ===
Rank	Team	Points
1	Wanty–Groupe Gobert	3235
2	Cofidis	3169
3	Androni–Sidermec–Bottecchia	2959
4	WB Veranclassic Aqua Protect	2613
5	Fortuneo–Oscaro	2587
6	Direct Énergie	2468
7	Roompot–Nederlandse Loterij	2245
8	Vérandas Willems–Crelan	2060
9	Armée de Terre	1800
10	CCC–Sprandi–Polkowice	1729

=== Nations classification ===
Rank	Nation	Points
1	France	5802
2	Italy	5676
3	Belgium	5172
4	Spain	3718
5	Netherlands	3498
6	Germany	3134
7	Norway	3085
8	Denmark	2330
9	Great Britain	2280
10	Switzerland	2148

=== Nations under-23 classification ===
Rank	Nation	Points
1	France	2164
2	Denmark	1617
3	Belgium	1349
4	Netherlands	1257
5	Great Britain	840
6	Italy	682
7	Russia	679
8	Norway	634
9	Spain	570
10	Poland	466
