= Enrico Battaglin =

Italian road racing cyclist

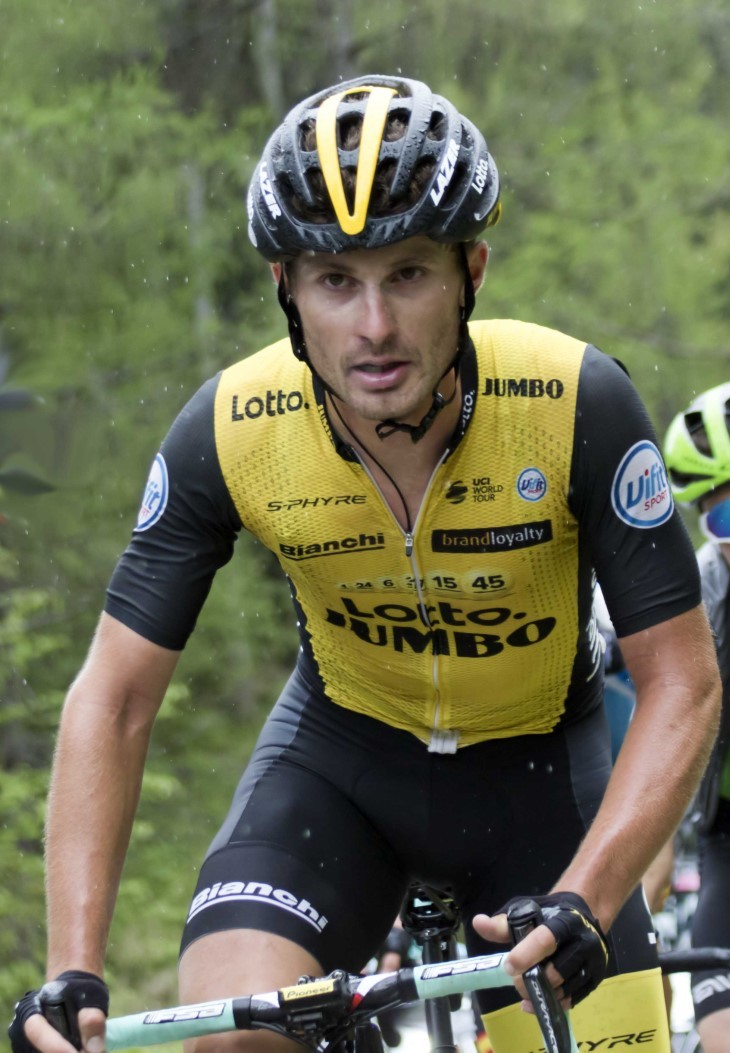
- Battaglin at the 2018 Giro d'Italia

Personal information
- Full name: Enrico Battaglin
- Born: 17 November 1989 (age 36) Marostica, Italy
- Height: 1.74 m (5 ft 9 in)
- Weight: 66 kg (146 lb)

Cycling career
- Sport: Cycling
- Discipline: Road
- Role: Rider
- Rider type: Puncheur

Professional teams
- 2008–2011: Zalf–Désirée–Fior
- 2011: → Colnago–CSF Inox (stagiaire)
- 2012–2015: Colnago–CSF Bardiani
- 2016–2018: LottoNL–Jumbo
- 2019: Team Katusha–Alpecin
- 2020: Bahrain–McLaren
- 2021–2022: Bardiani–CSF–Faizanè

Major wins
- Grand Tours Giro d'Italia 3 individual stages (2013, 2014, 2018)

Enrico Battaglin (born 17 November 1989) is a retired professional road cyclist from Italy.

== Career ==
Born in Marostica, Italy, Battaglin was signed by Colnago at the age of 17 because they felt he had a lot of potential, but spent 4 years in the youth ranks before graduating to the main team. He made a major impact immediately after joining the professional ranks, winning the Coppa Sabatini as a stagiaire in 2011.

In 2013 Battaglin won the fourth stage of the Giro d'Italia, a 246 km (152.9 mi) affair concluding with two climbs. He won the sprint of the main group ahead of fellow Italians Fabio Felline and Giovanni Visconti. He was named in the startlist for the 2016 Vuelta a España.

== Major results ==
2007
9th Overall Giro della Lunigiana

1st Stage 4

2008
1st Coppa Città di San Daniele
8th Trofeo Gianfranco Bianchin
2009
1st Giro Valli Aretine
3rd Trofeo Città di San Vendemiano
3rd Giro del Medio Brenta
6th Overall Giro del Friuli-Venezia Giulia
8th Gran Premio Palio del Recioto
8th Coppa della Pace
2010
1st Overall Giro delle Regioni

1st Stage 1

1st Gran Premio San Giuseppe
1st GP Capodarco
2nd Gran Premio Palio del Recioto
3rd Trofeo Città di San Vendemiano
3rd Gran Premio di Poggiana
7th Trofeo Alcide Degasperi
2011
1st Trofeo Zsšdi
1st Gran Premio San Giuseppe
1st Coppa Sabatini
1st GP Ezio del Rosso
1st Coppa Collecchio
2nd Giro del Medio Brenta
2nd GP Capodarco
3rd Giro del Belvedere
3rd Giro della Romagna
4th Gran Premio Palio del Recioto
6th Gran Premio di Poggiana
7th Overall Girobio
7th Trofeo Melinda
2012
1st Stage 1b (TTT) Monviso-Venezia — Il Padania
3rd Gran Premio di Lugano
7th Overall Tour of Turkey
2013
1st Stage 4 Giro d'Italia
3rd Trofeo Matteotti
8th Giro di Toscana
2014
1st Stage 14 Giro d'Italia
4th Coppa Ugo Agostoni
5th Coppa Sabatini
7th Giro dell'Appennino
2015
4th Volta Limburg Classic
5th Trofeo Matteotti
2016
9th Cadel Evans Great Ocean Road Race
2017
8th Japan Cup
2018
1st Stage 5 Giro d'Italia
9th Cadel Evans Great Ocean Road Race
2020
7th Coppa Sabatini
8th Giro dell'Appennino
2021
3rd Giro dell'Appennino

=== Grand Tour general classification results timeline ===
| Grand Tour | 2012 | 2013 | 2014 | 2015 | 2016 | 2017 | 2018 | 2019 | 2020 | 2021 |
|---|---|---|---|---|---|---|---|---|---|---|
| Giro d'Italia | 74 | DNF | 52 | DNF | 42 | 64 | 34 | 66 | 46 | 85 |
| Tour de France | Has not contested during career | | | | | | | | | |
| Vuelta a España | — | — | — | — | DNF | — | — | 113 | — | — |

Legend
| — | Did not compete |
| DNF | Did not finish |
