= Fabio Mazzucco =

Italian cyclist (born 1999)

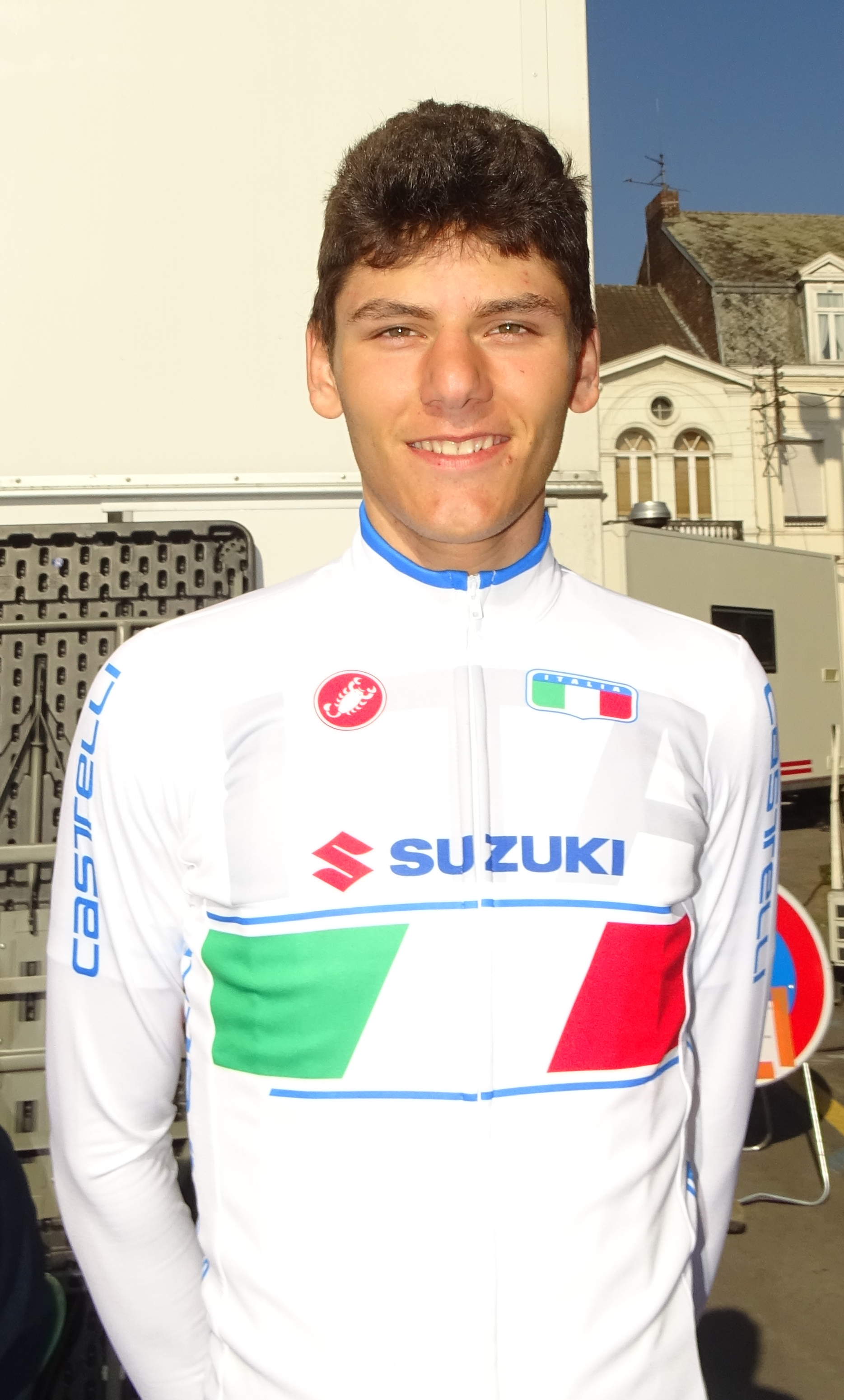
- Mazzucco at the 2017 Paris–Roubaix Juniors

Personal information
- Born: 14 April 1999 (age 27) Este, Veneto, Italy
- Height: 1.83 m (6 ft 0 in)
- Weight: 69 kg (152 lb)

Cycling career
- Sport: Cycling
- Current team: MG.K Vis Costruzioni e Ambiente
- Discipline: Road
- Role: Rider
- Rider type: Sprinter

Professional teams
- 2018: Trevigiani Phonix–Hemus 1896
- 2019: Sangemini–Trevigiani–MG.K Vis
- 2020–2022: Bardiani–CSF–Faizanè
- 2023–: MG.K Vis Colors for Peace

Fabio Mazzucco (born 14 April 1999) is an Italian cyclist, who currently rides for UCI Continental team MG.K Vis Costruzioni e Ambiente. In October 2020, he was named in the startlist for the 2020 Giro d'Italia.

== Major results ==
2016
3rd Road race, National Junior Road Championships
10th Trofeo Buffoni
10th G.P. Sportivi di Sovilla
2017
1st Gran Premio dell'Arno
3rd Overall Giro della Lunigiana
3rd Trofeo Buffoni
3rd G.P. Sportivi di Sovilla
8th Paris–Roubaix Juniors
2018
5th Gran Premio Industrie del Marmo
5th Gran Premio della Liberazione
9th Overall Toscana-Terra di Ciclismo
2019
1st Gran Premio Sportivi di Poggiana
1st Stage 3 Giro Ciclistico d'Italia
3rd Giro del Medio Brenta
9th Trofeo Piva

=== Grand Tour general classification results timeline ===
Grand Tour	2020
Giro d'Italia	129
Tour de France	—
Vuelta a España	—

Legend
—	Did not compete
DNF	Did not finish
