= Stefano Nardelli =

Italian cyclist

Personal information
- Full name: Stefano Nardelli
- Born: 29 November 1993 (age 32) Trento, Italy
- Height: 1.78 m (5 ft 10 in)
- Weight: 62 kg (137 lb)

Cycling career
- Sport: Cycling
- Current team: Retired
- Discipline: Road
- Role: Rider

Amateur teams
- 2008–2011: U.S. Montecorona
- 2013–2014: G.S. Gavardo–Tecmor ASD
- 2017: G.S. Gavardo–Bi&Esse ASD

Professional teams
- 2013: Accent Jobs–Wanty (stagiaire)
- 2015: Unieuro–Wilier
- 2016: Efapel

Stefano Nardelli (born 29 November 1993) is an Italian former professional cyclist.

== Major results ==
2013
4th Gran Premio della Liberazione
9th Gran Premio di Poggiana
2014
3rd Gran Premio Palio del Recioto
7th Trofeo Alcide Degasperi
2015
1st Gran Premio di Poggiana
2nd Trofeo Città di San Vendemiano
6th Overall Giro della Valle d'Aosta
6th Trofeo Alcide Degasperi
7th Trofeo Internazionale Bastianelli
10th Coppa della Pace
