= 2017 Settimana Internazionale di Coppi e Bartali =

2017 UCI Europe Tour

Race details
- Dates: 23–26 March 2018
- Stages: 5
- Distance: 565 km (351.1 mi)
- Winning time: 13h 37' 51"

Results
	Winner	Lilian Calmejane (FRA)
	Second	Toms Skujiņš (LAT)
	Third	Jaime Rosón (ESP)
	Points	Lilian Calmejane (FRA)
	Mountains	Danilo Celano (ITA)
	Youth	Egan Bernal (COL)
	Team	Fortuneo–Vital Concept

The 2017 Settimana Internazionale di Coppi e Bartali was a road cycling stage race that took place between 23 and 26 March 2017. The race was rated as a 2.1 event as part of the 2018 UCI Europe Tour, and was the 32nd edition of the Settimana Internazionale di Coppi e Bartali cycling race.

The race was won by Italian rider Lilian Calmejane of Direct Énergie.

== Teams ==
Twenty-five teams started the race. Each team had a maximum of eight riders:

UCI WorldTeams

- Cannondale–Drapac
- Team Sky
- Team Dimension Data

UCI Professional Continental teams

- Caja Rural–Seguros RGA
- Direct Énergie
- Gazprom–RusVelo
- Wilier Triestina–Selle Italia
- Bardiani–CSF
- CCC–Sprandi–Polkowice
- Nippo–Vini Fantini
- Androni Giocattoli–Sidermec
- Fortuneo–Vital Concept

UCI Continental teams

- Amore & Vita–Selle SMP
- D'Amico Utensilnord
- Kolss Cycling Team
- Minsk Cycling Club
- Synergy Baku
- Unieuro Trevigiani–Hemus 1896
- Bicicletas Strongman
- GM Europa Ovini
- Lokosphinx
- Sangemini–MG.K Vis
- Tirol Cycling Team
- WIGGINS

National team

- Italy

== Route ==
Stage characteristics and winners
Stage	Date	Course	Distance	Type	Stage winner
1a	23 March	Gatteo to Gatteo	97.8 km (60.8 mi)	Hilly stage	Laurent Pichon (FRA)
1b	23 March	Gatteo a Mare to Gatteo	13.3 km (8.3 mi)	Team time trial	CCC–Sprandi–Polkowice
2	24 March	Riccione to Sogliano al Rubicone	130 km (81 mi)	Hilly stage	Toms Skujiņš (LAT)
3	25 March	Crevalcore to Crevalcore	171.4 km (106.5 mi)	Flat stage	Thomas Boudat (FRA)
4	26 March	Fiorano Modenese to Sassuolo	152.5 km (94.8 mi)	Hilly stage	Lilian Calmejane (FRA)

== Stages ==
=== Stage 1a ===
Stage 1a result

Rank	Rider	Team	Time
1	Laurent Pichon (FRA)	Fortuneo–Vital Concept	2h 08' 34"
2	Lilian Calmejane (FRA)	Direct Énergie	s.t.
3	Elia Viviani (ITA)	Team Sky	+ 19"
4	Matteo Malucelli (ITA)	Androni Giocattoli–Sidermec	s.t.
5	Marco Canola (ITA)	Nippo–Vini Fantini	s.t.
6	František Sisr (CZE)	CCC–Sprandi–Polkowice	s.t.
7	Ryan Gibbons (RSA)	Team Dimension Data	s.t.
8	Filippo Fortin (ITA)	Tirol Cycling Team	s.t.
9	Armindo Fonseca (FRA)	Fortuneo–Vital Concept	s.t.
10	Toms Skujiņš (LAT)	Cannondale–Drapac	s.t.

General classification after Stage 1a

Rank	Rider	Team	Time
1	Laurent Pichon (FRA)	Fortuneo–Vital Concept	2h 08' 28"
2	Lilian Calmejane (FRA)	Direct Énergie	+ 2"
3	Elia Viviani (ITA)	Team Sky	+ 23"
4	Matteo Malucelli (ITA)	Androni Giocattoli–Sidermec	+ 25"
5	Marco Canola (ITA)	Nippo–Vini Fantini	s.t.
6	František Sisr (CZE)	CCC–Sprandi–Polkowice	s.t.
7	Ryan Gibbons (RSA)	Team Dimension Data	s.t.
8	Filippo Fortin (ITA)	Tirol Cycling Team	s.t.
9	Armindo Fonseca (FRA)	Fortuneo–Vital Concept	s.t.
10	Toms Skujiņš (LAT)	Cannondale–Drapac	s.t.

=== Stage 1b ===
For the time trial, each team was split into two four-man teams.

Stage 1b result

Rank	Team	Time
1	CCC–Sprandi–Polkowice team A	14' 57"
2	Team Sky team A	+ 2"
3	Direct Énergie team A	+ 13"
4	Team Dimension Data team A	+ 15"
5	Androni Giocattoli–Sidermec team A	+ 17"
6	Cannondale–Drapac team A	s.t.
7	CCC–Sprandi–Polkowice team B	+ 23"
8	Sangemini–MG.K Vis team A	+ 28"
9	Androni Giocattoli–Sidermec team B	+ 29"
10	Lokosphinx team A	s.t.

General classification after Stage 1b

Rank	Rider	Team	Time
1	Lilian Calmejane (FRA)	Direct Énergie	2h 23' 40"
2	Elia Viviani (ITA)	Team Sky	+ 10"
3	Adrian Kurek (POL)	CCC–Sprandi–Polkowice	s.t.
4	Jan Tratnik (SLO)	CCC–Sprandi–Polkowice	s.t.
5	Tao Geoghegan Hart (GBR)	Team Sky	+ 12"
6	Ian Boswell (USA)	Team Sky	s.t.
7	Laurent Pichon (FRA)	Fortuneo–Vital Concept	+ 19"
8	Romain Sicard (FRA)	Direct Énergie	+ 23"
9	Ryan Gibbons (RSA)	Team Dimension Data	+ 25"
10	Omar Fraile (ESP)	Team Dimension Data	s.t.

=== Stage 2 ===
Stage 2 result

Rank	Rider	Team	Time
1	Toms Skujiņš (LAT)	Cannondale–Drapac	3h 31' 26"
2	Arnold Jeannesson (FRA)	Fortuneo–Vital Concept	+ 7"
3	Matteo Busato (ITA)	Wilier Triestina–Selle Italia	s.t.
4	Jaime Rosón (ESP)	Caja Rural–Seguros RGA	s.t.
5	Eduardo Sepúlveda (ARG)	Fortuneo–Vital Concept	s.t.
6	Egan Bernal (COL)	Androni Giocattoli–Sidermec	s.t.
7	Kirill Pozdnyakov (RUS)	Synergy Baku	s.t.
8	Danilo Celano (ITA)	Amore & Vita–Selle SMP	s.t.
9	Rodolfo Torres (COL)	Androni Giocattoli–Sidermec	+ 14"
10	Mauro Finetto (ITA)	Italy	+ 26"

General classification after Stage 2

Rank	Rider	Team	Time
1	Toms Skujiņš (LAT)	Cannondale–Drapac	5h 55' 23"
2	Lilian Calmejane (FRA)	Direct Énergie	+ 16"
3	Egan Bernal (COL)	Androni Giocattoli–Sidermec	+ 17"
4	Rodolfo Torres (COL)	Androni Giocattoli–Sidermec	+ 24"
5	Jaime Rosón (ESP)	Caja Rural–Seguros RGA	+ 37"
6	Arnold Jeannesson (FRA)	Fortuneo–Vital Concept	+ 52"
7	Marco Canola (ITA)	Nippo–Vini Fantini	+ 55"
8	Mauro Finetto (ITA)	Italy	+ 1' 03"
9	Manuel Senni (ITA)	Italy	+ 1' 10"
10	Ian Boswell (USA)	Team Sky	s.t.

=== Stage 3 ===
Stage 3 result

Rank	Rider	Team	Time
1	Thomas Boudat (FRA)	Direct Énergie	3h 57' 50"
2	Alan Banaszek (POL)	CCC–Sprandi–Polkowice	s.t.
3	Will Clarke (ITA)	Cannondale–Drapac	s.t.
4	Armindo Fonseca (FRA)	Fortuneo–Vital Concept	s.t.
5	Toms Skujiņš (LAT)	Cannondale–Drapac	s.t.
6	Maxime Bouet (FRA)	Fortuneo–Vital Concept	s.t.
7	Stanislau Bazhkou (BLR)	Minsk Cycling Club	s.t.
8	Justin Oien (USA)	Caja Rural–Seguros RGA	s.t.
9	Niccolò Salvietti (ITA)	Sangemini–MG.K Vis	s.t.
10	Lilian Calmejane (FRA)	Direct Énergie	s.t.

General classification after Stage 3

Rank	Rider	Team	Time
1	Toms Skujiņš (LAT)	Cannondale–Drapac	9h 53' 13"
2	Lilian Calmejane (FRA)	Direct Énergie	+ 16"
3	Jaime Rosón (ESP)	Caja Rural–Seguros RGA	+ 37"
4	Egan Bernal (COL)	Androni Giocattoli–Sidermec	+ 54"
5	Rodolfo Torres (COL)	Androni Giocattoli–Sidermec	+ 1' 01"
6	Ian Boswell (USA)	Team Sky	+ 1' 10"
7	Romain Sicard (FRA)	Direct Énergie	+ 1' 21"
8	Marco Canola (ITA)	Nippo–Vini Fantini	+ 1' 32"
9	Florian Vachon (FRA)	Fortuneo–Vital Concept	+ 1' 39"
10	Merhawi Kudus (ERI)	Team Dimension Data	+ 2' 00"

=== Stage 4 ===
Stage 4 result

Rank	Rider	Team	Time
1	Lilian Calmejane (FRA)	Direct Énergie	3h 44' 32"
2	Rodolfo Torres (COL)	Androni Giocattoli–Sidermec	s.t.
3	Florian Vachon (FRA)	Fortuneo–Vital Concept	s.t.
4	Matteo Busato (ITA)	Wilier Triestina–Selle Italia	s.t.
5	Nicola Gaffurini (ITA)	Sangemini–MG.K Vis	s.t.
6	Jaime Rosón (ESP)	Caja Rural–Seguros RGA	s.t.
7	Kirill Pozdnyakov (AZE)	Synergy Baku	s.t.
8	Mattia Cattaneo (ITA)	Androni Giocattoli–Sidermec	s.t.
9	Egan Bernal (COL)	Androni Giocattoli–Sidermec	s.t.
10	Ian Boswell (USA)	Team Sky	s.t.

== Final general classification ==
Final general classification

Rank	Rider	Team	Time
1	Lilian Calmejane (FRA)	Direct Énergie	13h 37' 51"
2	Toms Skujiņš (LAT)	Cannondale–Drapac	+ 16"
3	Jaime Rosón (ESP)	Caja Rural–Seguros RGA	+ 31"
4	Egan Bernal (COL)	Androni Giocattoli–Sidermec	+ 48"
5	Rodolfo Torres (COL)	Androni Giocattoli–Sidermec	+ 49"
6	Ian Boswell (USA)	Team Sky	+ 1' 04"
7	Florian Vachon (FRA)	Fortuneo–Vital Concept	+ 1' 29"
8	Romain Sicard (FRA)	Direct Énergie	+ 1' 37"
9	Kirill Pozdnyakov (AZE)	Synergy Baku	+ 1' 54"
10	Nicola Gaffurini (ITA)	Sangemini–MG.K Vis	+ 2' 04"
