= Luigi Miletta =

Italian cyclist

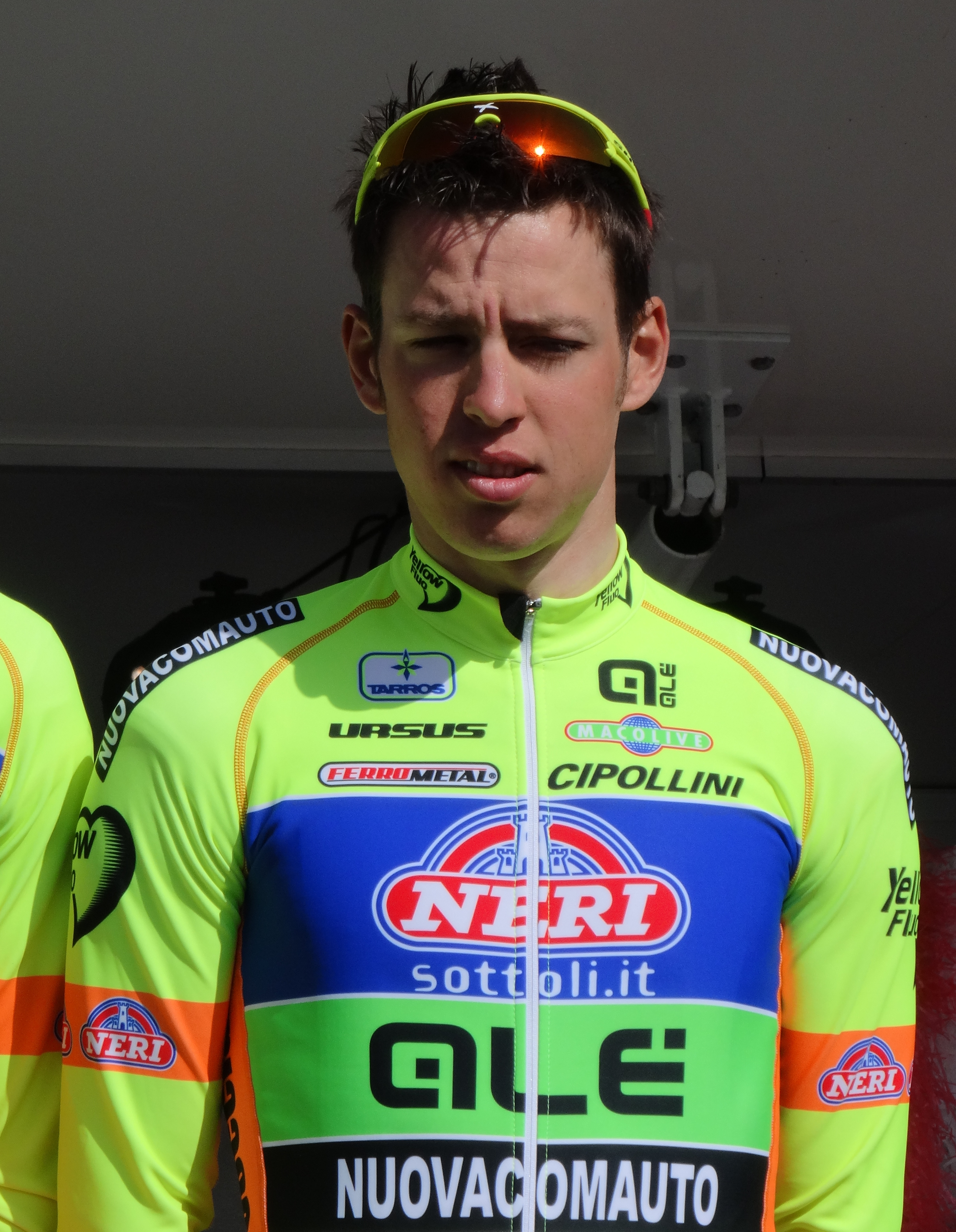
- Miletta in 2014

Personal information
- Born: 9 August 1988 (age 38) Pisa, Italy
- Height: 180 cm (5 ft 11 in)
- Weight: 63 kg (139 lb)

Cycling career
- Sport: Cycling
- Current team: Retired
- Discipline: Road
- Role: Rider

Amateur team
- 2007–2012: Gragnano Sporting Club

Professional team
- 2013–2014: Vini Fantini–Selle Italia

Luigi Miletta (born 9 August 1988) is a former Italian racing cyclist. He rode at the 2013 UCI Road World Championships in Florence.

== Major results ==
2010
1st Giro del Medio Brenta
8th Trofeo Città di San Vendemiano
2011
7th Piccolo Giro di Lombardia
7th Trofeo Edil C
9th Ruota d'Oro
10th Chrono Champenois
10th Coppa della Pace
2012
1st Trofeo Internazionale Bastianelli
9th Coppa della Pace
