= Marco Tecchio =

Italian racing cyclist

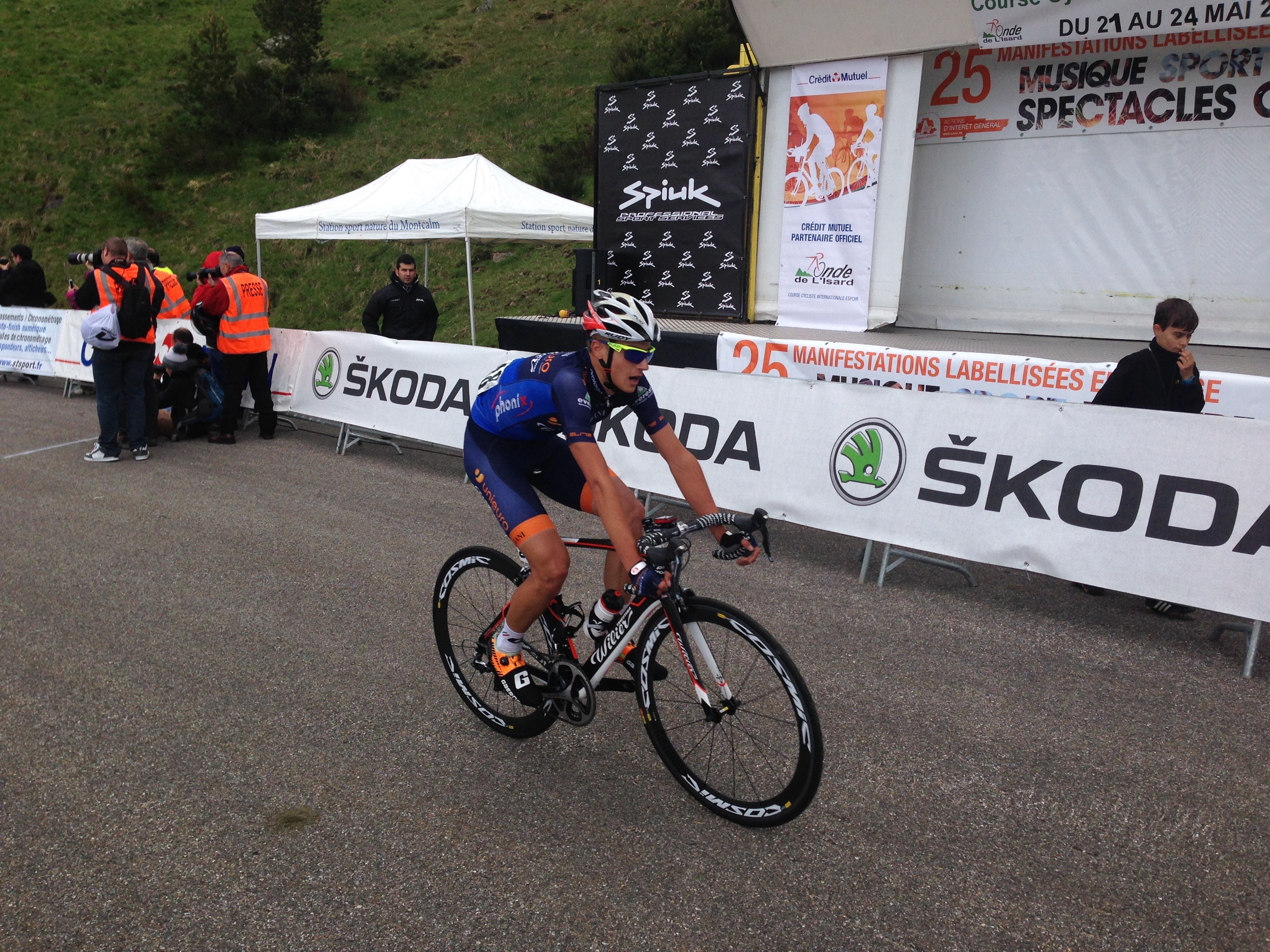

Personal information
- Full name: Marco Tecchio
- Born: 31 August 1994 (age 32) Valdagno, Italy

Cycling career
- Sport: Cycling
- Disciplines: Road; Mountain biking
- Role: Rider

Amateur team
- 2017: Trek–Selle San Marco

Professional teams
- 2014: Area Zero Pro Team
- 2015–2016: Unieuro–Wilier

Marco Tecchio (born 31 August 1994 in Valdagno) is an Italian former professional cyclist, who rode professionally for Area Zero Pro Team in 2014 and Unieuro–Wilier in 2015 and 2016.

== Major results ==
2015
5th Overall Giro del Friuli-Venezia Giulia
5th Tour of Almaty
7th Trofeo Città di San Vendemiano
9th Overall Ronde de l'Isard
9th GP Laguna
2016
1st Overall Tour of Bulgaria

1st Young rider classification
1st Stage 3

1st Young rider classification Sibiu Cycling Tour
3rd Trofeo Banca Popolare di Vicenza
9th Gran Premio Palio del Recioto
10th Memorial Marco Pantani
