= Daniele Dall'Oste =

Italian cyclist

Personal information
- Born: 24 May 1991 (age 35) Varese, Italy

Cycling career
- Sport: Cycling
- Discipline: Road
- Role: Rider

Amateur teams
- 2010–2011: Palazzago Elledent Rad
- 2012–2013: U.C. Trevigiani–Dynamon–Bottoli

Daniele Dall'Oste (born 24 May 1991 in Varese) is an Italian cyclist.

== Palmares ==
2012
1st Giro del Belvedere
1st Prologue Giro della Valle d'Aosta
2nd Trofeo Città di San Vendemiano
3rd Gran Premio Palio del Recioto
2013
2nd Overall Giro del Friuli Venezia Giulia
3rd Gran Premio di Poggiana
