= Michele Gazzara =

Italian cyclist

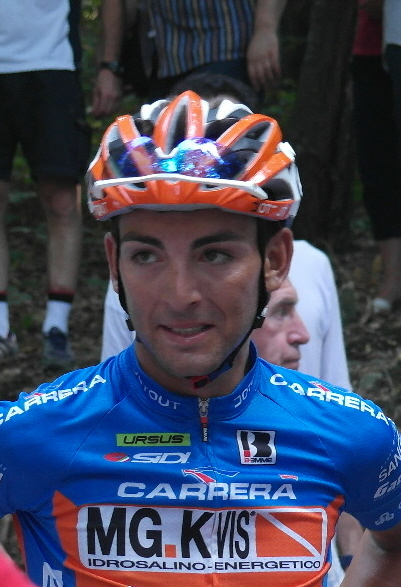
- Gazzara in 2015

Personal information
- Born: 27 September 1990 (age 36) Syracuse, Italy

Cycling career
- Sport: Cycling
- Discipline: Road
- Role: Rider
- Rider type: Climber

Amateur teams
- 2007–2008: ASD Rinascita Ormelle Sicilia
- 2010–2011: U.C. Trevigiani–Dynamon–Bottoli
- 2013–2014: Fausto Coppi Gazzera Videa

Professional team
- 2015–2018: Sangemini–MG.K Vis Vega

Michele Gazzara (born 27 September 1990 in Syracuse, Sicily) is an Italian road cyclist. He is a two-time winner of the Giro del Medio Brenta and won the 2018 Tour of Albania.

== Career ==
After victories including the Giro del Friuli Occidentale in 2008, the Tour of Valle d'Aosta in 2010, and the Trofeo Città di San Vendemiano in 2011 (the latter two riding for Trevigiani), he turned pro in 2015, joining Vega - Hotsand, and continued to ride for its various iterations, most recently Sangemini-MG.K Vis.

He was the first rider to win the Giro del Medio Brenta twice, in 2015 and 2017. In 2018, he won the Tour of Albania.

== Major results ==
2010
1st Stage 1 Tour of Valle d'Aosta
2011
1st Trofeo Città di San Vendemiano
2012
7th GP Capodarco
10th Gran Premio di Poggiana
2014
1st Trofeo Alcide Degasperi
10th Overall Giro del Friuli-Venezia Giulia
2015
1st Giro del Medio Brenta
1st Trofeo Internazionale Bastianelli
2016
2nd Overall CCC Tour-Grodów Piastowskich
4th Giro del Medio Brenta
2017
1st Giro del Medio Brenta
3rd Overall Tour of Albania
7th Coppa della Pace
2018
1st Overall Tour of Albania

1st Stage 1

6th Overall Sibiu Cycling Tour
10th Gran Premio di Lugano
