= Manuele Spadi =

Italian cyclist

Donato Cannone
Personal information
- Born: 16 February 1982 (age 44) Pistoia, Italy

Cycling career
- Sport: Cycling
- Current team: Retired
- Discipline: Road
- Role: Rider

Amateur team
- 2004–2005: Futura–Matricardi

Professional teams
- 2005–2007: Ceramica Flaminia
- 2008: Cinelli–OPD

Manuele Spadi (born 19 October 1981) is an Italian former professional road cyclist.

== Major results ==
2033
3rd Gran Premio Industria del Cuoio e delle Pelli
2004
5th GP Industrie del Marmo
2005
1st Giro del Medio Brenta
3rd Trofeo Internazionale Bastianelli
7th GP Nobili Rubinetterie
2006
7th Overall Peace Race
7th GP Industria Artigianato e Commercio Carnaghese
8th Giro del Veneto
8th GP Industria & Commercio di Prato
9th Memorial Marco Pantani
10th Memorial Cimurri
2007
5th Overall Giro d'Abruzzo
10th Monte Paschi Eroica
10th GP Industria & Commercio di Prato
10th GP Industria & Artigianato di Larciano
2008
1st Stage 8 Clásico Ciclístico Banfoandes
8th Overall Vuelta Mexico
