= Tomas Alberio =

Italian bicycle racer

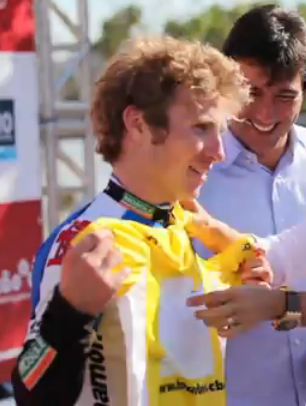

Personal information
- Full name: Tomas Alberio
- Born: 31 March 1989 (age 37) Bussolengo, Italy

Cycling career
- Sport: Cycling
- Current team: Retired
- Discipline: Road
- Role: Rider

Amateur teams
- 2007: G.S. Car Diesel
- 2008–2009: Filmop Sorelle Ramonda Bottoli
- 2010: U.C. Trevigiani–Dynamon–Bottoli

Professional teams
- 2011: Geox–TMC
- 2013: Team Idea

Tomas Alberio (born 31 March 1989, in Bussolengo) is an Italian former professional cyclist.

== Major results ==
2009
1st Trofeo Edil C
1st Stage 1 (TTT) Giro della Valle d'Aosta
3rd Gran Premio di Poggiana
2010
1st Overall Tour do Rio

1st Stages 1 & 2

1st Gran Premio Industrie del Marmo
3rd Gran Premio Palio del Recioto
