= Daniel Savini =

Italian cyclist (born 1997)

Personal information
- Born: 26 September 1997 (age 29) Lucca, Italy
- Height: 1.70 m (5 ft 7 in)
- Weight: 58 kg (128 lb)

Cycling career
- Sport: Cycling
- Current team: Retired
- Discipline: Road
- Role: Rider

Amateur teams
- 2016: Hopplà Petroli Firenze
- 2017: Maltinti Lampadari–Banca di Cambi

Professional teams
- 2018–2021: Bardiani–CSF
- 2022: MG.K Vis Colors for Peace VPM

Daniel Savini (born 26 September 1997) is an Italian former cyclist, who competed as a professional from 2018 to 2022.

== Major results ==
2015
1st Overall Giro della Lunigiana

1st Mountains classification
1st Stage 1

2nd Trofeo Città di Loano
7th Trofeo Emilio Paganessi
2016
10th Giro del Belvedere
2017
4th Giro del Belvedere
2018
10th Overall Oberösterreichrundfahrt

1st Young rider classification

2019
3rd Trofeo Matteotti
2020
3rd Trofeo Matteotti
2021
6th Overall Istrian Spring Trophy
