= Gianmarco Di Francesco =

Italian cyclist

Personal information
- Full name: Gianmarco Di Francesco
- Born: 2 August 1989 (age 37)

Cycling career
- Sport: Cycling
- Current team: Retired
- Discipline: Road
- Role: Rider

Amateur teams
- 2007: Team S.C.A.P. Prefabbricati Foresi
- 2010–2011: M. Pantani–Caffè Mokambo
- 2012–2013: SC Monturano–Civitanova Marche–Cascinare SRL

Professional team
- 2014–2016: Efapel–Glassdrive

Gianmarco Di Francesco (born 2 August 1989) is an Italian former professional cyclist.

== Major results ==
2011
9th Coppa della Pace
9th Trofeo Internazionale Bastianelli
2014
1st Stage 3 Giro della Regione Friuli
2015
1st Gran Premio Industrie del Marmo
4th Trofeo Internazionale Bastianelli
2016
5th Gran Premio Industrie del Marmo
6th Memorial Marco Pantani
8th Coppa Bernocchi
8th Tour of Almaty
