= Matteo Scalco =

Italian cyclist

- Scalco in 2026

Personal information
- Born: 25 June 2004 (age 22) Thiene, Italy

Cycling career
- Sport: Cycling
- Current team: XDS Astana Development Team
- Discipline: Road
- Role: Rider

Amateur team
- 2021–2022: Borgo Molino Rinascita Ormelle

Professional teams
- 2023–2025: Green Project–Bardiani–CSF–Faizanè
- 2026–: XDS Astana Development Team

Matteo Scalco (born 25 June 2004) is an Italian racing cyclist, who currently rides for UCI Continental team XDS Astana Development Team.

== Major results ==
2022
1st Trofeo Buffoni
2nd Trofeo Guido Dorigo
4th Road race, National Junior Road Championships
5th Giro di Primavera
2023
1st Coppa della Pace
8th Gran Premio Industrie del Marmo
2024
7th G.P. Palio del Recioto
2025
1st Gran Premio Sportivi di Poggiana
4th GP Capodarco
5th Overall Giro della Valle d'Aosta
6th Trofeo Piva
9th Overall Giro Next Gen
9th Giro della Provincia di Biella
10th Trofeo Tessile & Moda
2026
1st Overall Tour of Rhodes

1st Young rider classification
1st Stage 3

2nd G.P. Palio del Recioto
6th Road race, UCI Road World Under-23 Championships
9th Overall Tour de la Provence
