= Nicola Gaffurini =

Italian cyclist

Personal information
- Full name: Nicola Gaffurini
- Born: 15 December 1989 (age 36) Desenzano del Garda, Lombardy, Italy

Cycling career
- Sport: Cycling
- Current team: Retired
- Discipline: Road
- Role: Rider

Amateur teams
- 2008: SC Mazzano
- 2009–2013: Delio Gallina–S. Inox–Filcre

Professional teams
- 2014–2018: Vega–Hotsand
- 2019: Monkey Town–à Bloc

Nicola Gaffurini (born 15 December 1989) is an Italian former cyclist, who rode professionally between 2014 and 2019 for the Sangemini–MG.K Vis Vega and Monkey Town–à Bloc teams.

== Major results ==
2011
7th Trofeo Città di San Vendemiano
8th Trofeo Internazionale Bastianelli
2012
3rd Road race, National Amateur Road Championships
2013
7th Trofeo Internazionale Bastianelli
8th GP Capodarco
2014
1st Trofeo Internazionale Bastianelli
7th Coppa della Pace
10th Giro del Medio Brenta
2015
2nd Trofeo Internazionale Bastianelli
7th Trofeo Matteotti
2016
3rd Giro del Medio Brenta
4th Trofeo Matteotti
6th Tour of Almaty
2017
1st Belgrade Banjaluka II
1st Coppa della Pace
1st Mountains classification Tour of Albania
2nd GP Adria Mobil
4th GP Laguna
4th Trofeo Città di Brescia
4th Giro del Medio Brenta
8th Trofeo Matteotti
8th Coppa Ugo Agostoni
9th Overall Settimana Internazionale di Coppi e Bartali
9th Coppa Sabatini
2018
2nd Overall Tour of Albania

1st Mountains classification
1st Stage 4

2nd Trofeo Città di Brescia
10th Overall Sibiu Cycling Tour
