= Massimo Rosa =

Italian cyclist

Personal information
- Born: 9 December 1995 (age 30) Alba, Italy

Cycling career
- Sport: Cycling
- Current team: Giant–Liv Polimedical
- Disciplines: Road; Mountain biking
- Role: Rider

Amateur teams
- 2015: Palazzago Fenice
- 2016–2017: Hopplà–Petroli Firenze
- 2020–: Giant–Liv Polimedical

Professional team
- 2018–2019: Wilier Triestina–Selle Italia

Massimo Rosa (born 9 December 1995 in Alba) is an Italian cyclist who currently rides for mountain bike racing team Giant–Liv Polimedical. He is the younger brother of fellow professional cyclist Diego Rosa.

== Major results ==
2017
1st Mountains classification Giro della Valle d'Aosta
3rd G.P. Palio del Recioto
