= MG.K Vis Costruzioni e Ambiente =

Italian cycling team

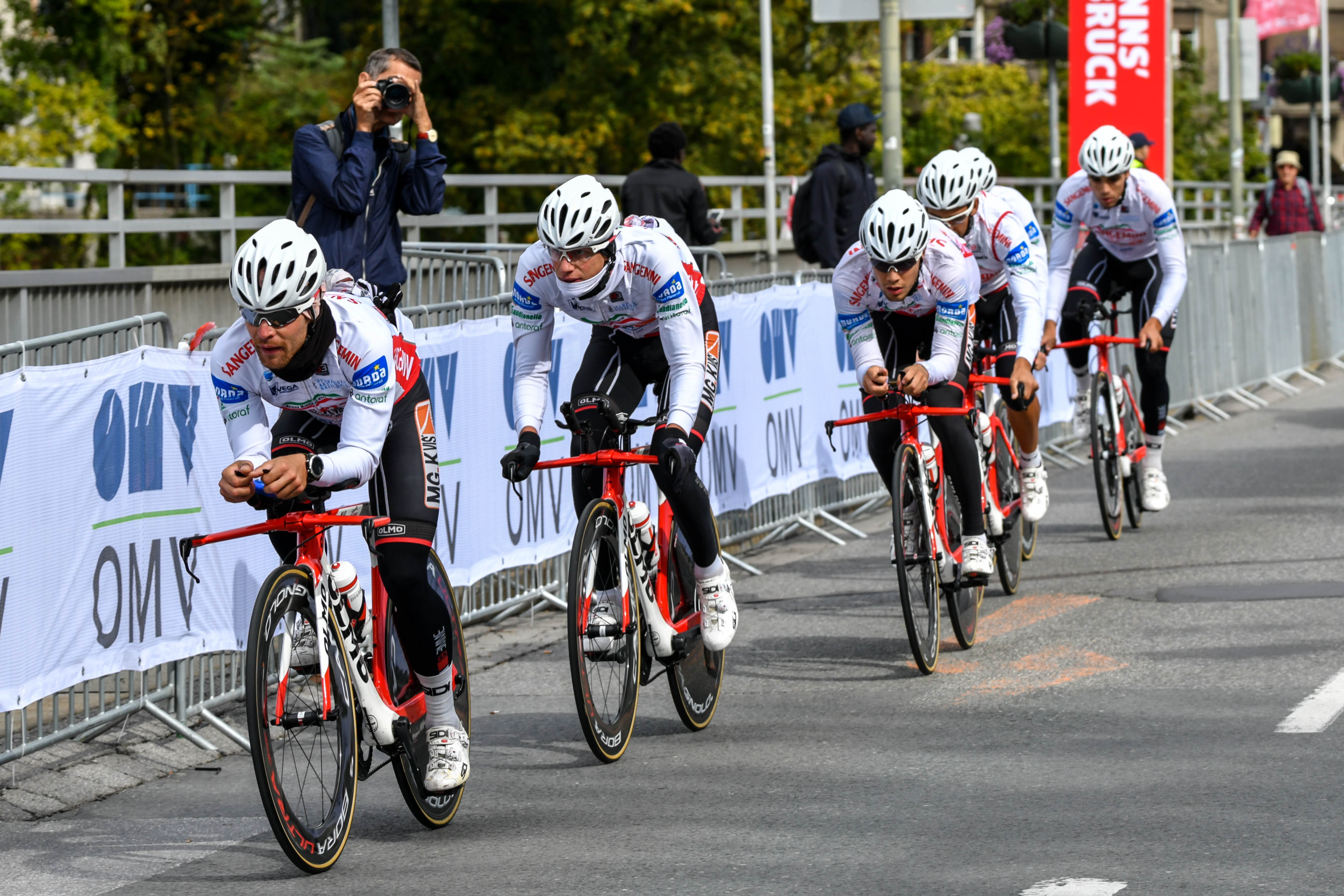

Team information
- UCI code: MGK
- Registered: Italy
- Founded: 2014
- Discipline: Road
- Status: UCI Continental

Key personnel
- General manager: Maurizio Frizzo
- Team managers: Angelo Baldini; Diego Cecchi; Floriano Torresi

Team name history
- 2014 2015 2016 2017 2018 2019–2020 2021 2022 2023–2024 2025–: Vega–Hotsand (VHS); MG.Kvis Vega (VHS); Norda–MG.K Vis Vega (NMG); Sangemini–MG.K Vis (SAN); Sangemini–MG.K Vis–Vega (SMV); Sangemini–Trevigiani–MG.K Vis; MG.K vis VPM (MGK); MG.K vis Colors for Peace VPM (MGK); MG.K vis Colors for Peace (MGK); MG.K Vis Costruzioni e Ambiente

MG.K Vis Costruzioni e Ambiente is an Italian UCI Continental team founded in 2014. It participates in UCI Continental Circuits races.

== Team roster ==
As of 30 October 2022.

| Rider | Date of birth |
|---|---|
| Francesco Carollo (ITA) | 17 August 2000 (age 26) |
| Alessio Conforti (ITA) | 6 November 2001 (age 24) |
| Jacopo Cortese (ITA) | 6 September 2000 (age 26) |
| Paul Double (GBR) | 25 June 1996 (age 30) |
| Guido Draghi (ITA) | 9 June 2001 (age 25) |
| Daan Hoeks (NED) | 5 April 2000 (age 26) |

| Rider | Date of birth |
|---|---|
| Edoardo Martinelli (ITA) | 27 January 2000 (age 26) |
| Simone Piccolo (ITA) | 20 October 1997 (age 28) |
| Daniel Savini (ITA) | 26 September 1997 (age 28) |
| Connor Sens (AUS) | 27 July 1999 (age 27) |
| Maximilian Stedman (GBR) | 22 March 1996 (age 30) |
| Paul Wright (NZL) | 3 February 1998 (age 28) |

== Major wins ==
2014
Trofeo Internazionale Bastianelli, Nicola Gaffurini
Stage 3 Giro del Friuli-Venezia Giulia, Gianmarco Di Francesco
2015
Gran Premio Industrie del Marmo, Gianmarco Di Francesco
Giro del Medio Brenta, Michele Gazzara
Trofeo Internazionale Bastianelli, Michele Gazzara
2017
Belgrade Banjaluka II, Nicola Gaffurini
Overall Tour of Albania, Francesco Manuel Bongiorno

Stage 2, Paolo Totò
Stage 4, Francesco Manuel Bongiorno

Coppa della Pace, Nicola Gaffurini
Giro del Medio Brenta, Michele Gazzara
2018
GP Laguna Porec, Paolo Totò
Overall Tour of Albania, Michele Gazzara

Stage 1, Michele Gazzara
Stage 4, Nicola Gaffurini

2019
Stage 3 Giro Ciclistico d'Italia, Fabio Mazzucco
Stage 3a (ITT) Tour of Szeklerland, Paolo Totò
Gran Premio di Poggiana, Fabio Mazzucco
GP Capodarco, Filippo Zana
2022
Stage 2 Tour of Bulgaria, Paul Double
2025
Rutland–Melton CiCLE Classic, Ben Granger
