= Gran Premio Palio del Recioto =

Race details
- Date: March/April
- Region: Province of Verona
- Discipline: Road race
- Competition: UCI Europe Tour
- Type: Single day race
- Organiser: Grandi Eventi Valpolicella
- Web site: www.paliodelrecioto.com

History
- First edition: 1961
- Editions: 63 (as of 2026)
- First winner: Giovanni Cordioli (ITA)
- Most wins: Alessandro Bertolini (ITA) (2 wins)
- Most recent: Lorenzo Finn (ITA)

The Gran Premio Palio del Recioto is a professional one day cycling race held annually in Italy. It is part of UCI Europe Tour in category 1.2U.

== Winners ==
Year	Winner	Second	Third
1980	(Italy) Enzo Serpelloni	(Norway) Morten Sæther	
1981	(Norway) Morten Sæther		
1982	(Italy) Mario Condolo	(Norway) Morten Sæther	
1983	(Italy) Ezio Moroni	(Denmark) Jørgen Vagn Pedersen	(Italy) Bestetti
1984	(Italy) Fabrizio Vitali		
1985	(Sweden) Stefan Brykt	(Italy) Giuliano dal Zovo	(Italy) Remo Cugole
1986	(Italy) Moravio Pianegonda	(Sweden) Lars Wahlqvist	(Sweden) Allen Andersson
1987	(Soviet Union) Dimitri Konyshev	(Soviet Union) Vassili Jdanov	(Soviet Union) Djamolidine Abdoujaparov
1988	(Socialist Federal Republic of Yugoslavia) Jure Pavlič	(Italy) Adriano Amici	(Italy) Dario Bottaro
1989	(Sweden) Lars Wahlqvist	(Italy) Daniele Ciarini	(Italy) Massimo Ghirardi
1990	(Italy) Dario Nicoletti	(Italy) Ilario Scremin	(Italy) Massimo Iannicello
1991	(Italy) Mariano Piccoli	(Italy) Davide Rebellin	(Italy) Gilberto Simoni
1992	(Italy) Alessandro Bertolini	(Italy) Davide Rebellin	(Italy) Diego Pellegrini
1993	(Italy) Alessandro Bertolini	(Italy) Cristiano Andreani	(Italy) Mauro Bettin
1994	(Italy) Gianluca Pianegonda	(Switzerland) Oskar Camenzind	(Italy) Paolo Savoldelli
1995	(Italy) Mirko Celestino	(Italy) Luigi Della Bianca	(Italy) Sergio Previtali
1996	(Italy) Stefano Faustini	(Italy) Enrico Brunetti	(Italy) Cristian Gasperoni
1997	(Italy) Oscar Mason	(Italy) Gianmario Ortensi	(Italy) Alberto Ongarato
1998	(Italy) Paolo Bossoni	(Italy) Denis Lunghi	(Italy) Ruggero Marzoli
1999	(Italy) Manuel Bortolotto	(Czech Republic) Pavel Zerzan	(Italy) Ivan Basso
2000	(Switzerland) Fabian Cancellara	(Italy) Franco Pellizotti	(Czech Republic) Pavel Zerzan
2001	(Ukraine) Yaroslav Popovych	(Italy) Damiano Cunego	(Italy) Ivan Fanfoni
2002	(Italy) Cristian Tosoni	(Italy) Daniele Pietropolli	(Italy) Mario Serpellini
2003	(Ukraine) Denys Kostyuk	(Russia) Aleksandr Bajenov	(Italy) Emanuele Sella
2004	(Slovenia) Tomaž Nose	(Slovenia) Janez Brajkovič	(Italy) Domenico Pozzovivo
2005	(Belarus) Andrei Kunitski	(Italy) Miculà Dematteis	(Italy) Riccardo Riccò
2006	(Italy) Ermanno Capelli	(Denmark) Jonas Aaen Jørgensen	(Italy) Marco Corti
2007	(Croatia) Robert Kiserlovski	(Australia) Simon Clark	(Italy) Ermanno Capelli
2008	(Italy) Gianluca Brambilla	(Italy) Emanuele Moschen	(Italy) Manuele Caddeo
2009	(Italy) Stefano Locatelli	(Russia) Egor Silin	(Italy) Daniele Ratto
2010	(Slovenia) Blaž Furdi	(Italy) Enrico Battaglin	(Italy) Tomas Alberio
2011	(Austria) Georg Preidler	(Italy) Salvatore Puccio	(Italy) Stefano Locatelli
2012	(Italy) Francesco Manuel Bongiorno	(Italy) Davide Formolo	(Italy) Daniele Dall'Oste
2013	(Australia) Caleb Ewan	(Germany) Silvio Herklotz	(Slovenia) Luka Pibernik
2014	(Germany) Silvio Herklotz	(Australia) Robert Power	(Italy) Stefano Nardelli
2015	(Italy) Gianni Moscon	(Australia) Jack Haig	(Italy) Davide Gabburo
2016	(Portugal) Ruben Guerreiro	(Czech Republic) Michal Schlegel	(Eritrea) Amanuel Gebrezgabihier
2017	(United States) Neilson Powless	(Australia) Lucas Hamilton	(Italy) Massimo Rosa
2018	(South Africa) Stefan de Bod	(Slovenia) Tadej Pogačar	(Italy) Andrea Bagioli
2019	(Italy) Matteo Sobrero	(Italy) Samuele Battistella	(Italy) Giovanni Aleotti
2020–2021	No race due to the COVID-19 pandemic		
2022	(France) Romain Grégoire	(Colombia) Édgar Andrés Pinzón	(Norway) Johannes Staune-Mittet
2023	(Netherlands) Tijmen Graat	(Italy) Giulio Pellizzari	(Italy) Alessandro Pinarello
2024	(Italy) Alessandro Pinarello	(Colombia) Diego Pescador	(Austria) Sebastian Putz
2025	(Italy) Lorenzo Nespoli	(Italy) Lorenzo Finn	(Austria) Marco Schrettl
2026	(Italy) Lorenzo Finn	(Italy) Matteo Scalco	(Denmark) Kevin Biehl
