= Gran Premio della Liberazione =

Italian one-day road cycling race

Race details
- Date: 25 April
- Region: Italy
- Discipline: Road race
- Competition: UCI Europe Tour
- Type: Single-day
- Web site: www.gpliberazione.it/en/home

History (men)
- First edition: 1946
- Editions: 79 (as of 2026)
- First winner: Gustavo Guglielmetti (ITA)
- Most wins: Antonio Toniolo (ITA) (2 wins)
- Most recent: Mirko Bozzola (ITA)

Women's history
- First edition: 2016
- Editions: 4
- Final edition: 2022
- First winner: Marta Bastianelli (ITA)
- Most wins: Marta Bastianelli (ITA) (2 wins)
- Final winner: Silvia Persico (ITA)

Gran Premio della Liberazione is an Italian road bicycle race that has been held annually on 25 April since 1946. It marks the anniversary of the 1945 fall of Benito Mussolini's Italian Social Republic. It is a Single-day race that is rated 1.2 on the UCI Europe Tour.

== Winners ==
=== Men's race ===
Year	Country	Rider	Team
1946	Italy	Gustavo Guglielmetti	
1947	Italy	Spartaco Rosati	
1948	Italy	Bruno Fossa	
1949	Italy	Arnaldo Benfenati	
1950	Italy	Donato Piazza	
1951	Italy	Vincenzo Zucconelli	
1952	Italy	Renzo Ghirardi	
1953	Italy	Nazareno Venturini	
1954	Italy	Cleto Maule	
1955	Italy	Giancarlo Ceppi	
1956	Italy	Aurelio Cestari	
1957	Italy	Salvatore Morucci	
1958	Italy	Remo Tamagni	
1959	Italy	Romeo Venturelli	
1960	France	René Bianchi	
1961	Italy	Teodoro Cerbella	
1962	Italy	Antonio Toniolo	
1963	Italy	Antonio Toniolo	
1964	Italy	Carlo Storai	
1965	Italy	Ferruccio Manza	
1966	Czechoslovakia	Jaroslav Kvapil	
1967	Italy	Carlo Galazzi	
1968	Italy	Attilio Rota	
1969	Italy	Pietro Mingardi	
1970	Czechoslovakia	Rudolf Labus	
1971	Italy	Giuseppe Milioli	
1972	Soviet Union	Yuri Osincew	
1973	Soviet Union	Ivan Trifonov	
1974	Yugoslavia	Cvitko Bilić	
1975	Italy	Palmiro Masciarelli	
1976	Great Britain	William Nickson	
1977	Great Britain	Bob Downs	
1978	Denmark	Henning Jørgensen	
1979	Italy	Walter Delle Case	
1980	Italy	Marco Cattaneo	
1981	Soviet Union	Ivan Mitchenko	
1982	Poland	Andrej Serediuk	
1983	Italy	Claudio Golinelli	
1984	Spain	Manuel Domínguez	
1985	Italy	Gianni Bugno	
1986	Netherlands	Mark van Orsouw	
1987	Soviet Union	Dimitri Konyshev	
1988	West Germany	Bernd Gröne	
1989	Poland	Joachim Halupczok	
1990	West Germany	Uwe Winter	
1991	Italy	Andrea Solagna	
1992	United States	Vassili Davidenko	
1993	Italy	Alessandro Bertolini	
1994	Denmark	Alex Petersen	
1995	Italy	Paolo Valoti	
1996	Italy	Davide Casarotto	
1997	Italy	Cristiano Citton	
1998	Italy	Roberto Savoldi	
1999	Italy	Marco Zanotti	
2000	Italy	Lorenzo Bernucci	Vellutex
2001	Italy	Alberto Loddo	Zoccorinese–Vellutex
2002	Italy	Andrea Sanvido	Team Parolin–Radio Birikina
2003	Italy	Devid Garbelli	Bergamasca 1902
2004	Italy	Daniele Colli	Zalf–Désirée–Fior
2005	Australia	Christopher Sutton	Australia (national team)
2006	Australia	Matthew Goss	Southaustralia.com–AIS
2007	Italy	Manuele Boaro	Zalf–Désirée–Fior
2008	Italy	Andrea Grendene	Filmop Sorelle Ramonda Bottoli
2009	Italy	Sacha Modolo	Zalf–Désirée–Fior
2010	Slovenia	Jan Tratnik	Slovenia (national team)
2011	Italy	Matteo Trentin	Team Brilla–Pasta Montegrappa
2012	Italy	Enrico Barbin	U.C. Trevigiani–Dynamon–Bottoli
2013	Belarus	Ilia Koshevoy	Big Hunter Seanese
2014	Russia	Evgeny Shalunov	Lokosphinx
2015	Argentina	Lucas Gaday	Unieuro–Wilier
2016	Italy	Vincenzo Albanese	Hopplà–Petroli Firenze
2017	Italy	Seid Lizde	Team Colpack
2018	Italy	Alessandro Fedeli	Trevigiani Phonix–Hemus 1896
2019	No race due to financial reasons		
2020	No race due to the COVID-19 pandemic in Italy		
2021	Italy	Michele Gazzoli	Team Colpack–Ballan
2022	Germany	Henri Uhlig	Germany
2023	Italy	Alessandro Romele	Team Colpack–Ballan–CSB
2024	Italy	Davide Donati	Biesse–Carrera
2025	Italy	Lorenzo Masciarelli	MBH Bank Ballan CSB
2026	Italy	Mirko Bozzola	S.C. Padovani Polo Cherry Bank

=== Women's race ===
In 2016, the Gran Premio della Liberazione Pink was held for the first time, after a previous GP Liberazione race was held between 1989 and 2012.

Year	Country	Rider	Team
2016	Italy	Marta Bastianelli	Alé–Cipollini
2017	Italy	Marta Bastianelli	Alé–Cipollini
2018	Italy	Letizia Paternoster	Astana
2022	Italy	Silvia Persico	Valcar–Travel & Service
2023	Italy	Silvia Zanardi	Bepink
2024	Italy	Chiara Consonni	UAE Team ADQ
