= Alex Petersen =

American football coach (1924–2014)

Biographical details
- Born: July 20, 1924; Coquille, Oregon, U.S.
- Died: June 23, 2014 (aged 89); Corvallis, Oregon, U.S.

Coaching career (HC unless noted)

Football
- 1952–1954: Southern Oregon

Basketball
- 1955–1956: Southern Oregon
- 1975–1976: Southern Oregon

Head coaching record
- Overall: 8–14 (football); 19–29 (basketball)

Alexander Petersen Jr. (July 20, 1924 – June 23, 2014) was an American football coach, basketball coach and basketball player. He played basketball at Oregon State University, and while studying for his doctorate at Columbia University, he played a little basketball in the American League and the Eastern Basketball League of Connecticut. He returned to Oregon after finishing his doctorate. He was served as the head football coach at Southern Oregon College of Education—now known as Southern Oregon University—in Ashland, Oregon for three seasons, from 1952 to 1954. His record at Southern Oregon was 8–14.

== Head coaching record ==
=== Football ===
Year	Team	Overall	Conference	Standing	Bowl/playoffs
Southern Oregon Red Raiders (Far Western Conference) (1952–1953)
1952	Southern Oregon	3–5	0–3	5th	
1953	Southern Oregon	3–4	0–3	5th	
Southern Oregon Red Raiders (Oregon Collegiate Conference) (1954)
1954	Southern Oregon	2–5	2–2	T–3rd	
Southern Oregon:		8–14	2–8		
Total:		8–14			
