= Carlo Tonon =

Italian cyclist (1955–1996)

Personal information
- Full name: Carlo Tonon
- Born: 25 March 1955 San Vendemiano, Italy
- Died: 17 June 1996 (aged 41) Stabiuzzo, Italy

Cycling career
- Sport: Cycling
- Discipline: Road
- Role: Rider

Professional teams
- 1982–1983: Inoxpran
- 1984: Carrera Inoxpran

Carlo Tonon (25 March 1955, in San Vendemiano – 17 June 1996, in Stabiuzzo) was an Italian professional road bicycle racer.

He was a professional rider from 1982 through 1984 and twice started the Tour de France.

== 1984 Tour de France ==
Tonon finished his first Tour de France for Carrera, where he rode alongside Guido Bontempi, in 1982 as 116th. He was again selected for the 1984 Tour de France where in the 19th stage he collided with a tourist while descending the Col de Joux-Plane. He was transferred to Annecy hospital with a fractured skull. He remained in a coma for two months and was left with a permanent disability which contributed to him taking his own life in 1996, aged 41.

== Death and legacy ==
In 1996 Tonon committed suicide, hanging himself in his barn, having never totally recovered from his fall.

From 2004, the Memorial Carlo Tonon e Denis Zanette is staged, in memory of Tonon and Denis Zanette, another Italian cyclist who died in 2003.

== Palmarès ==
1982
Tour de France:

116th

1983
Giro d'Italia:

134th
