= Cristian Gasperoni =

Italian cyclist

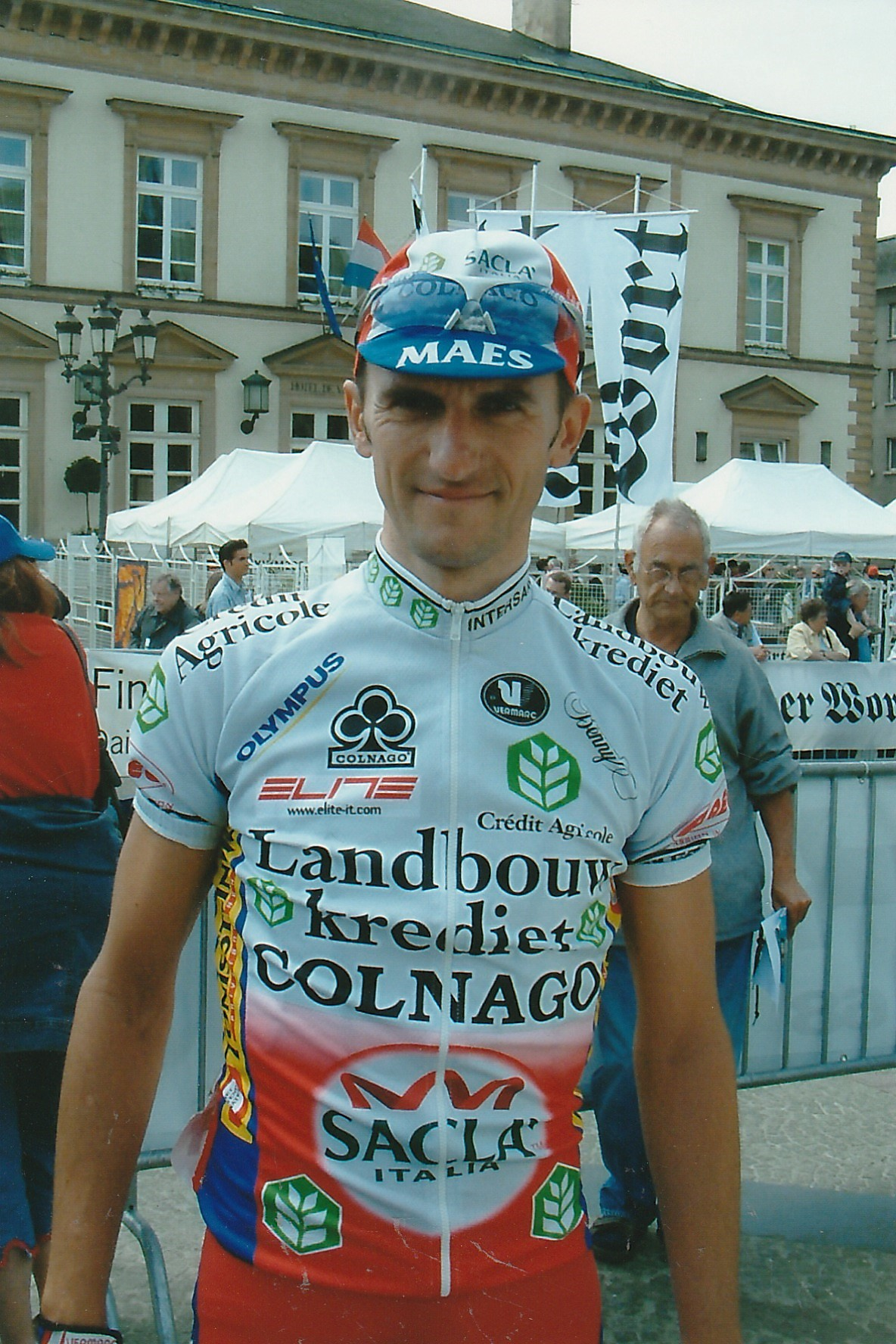

Personal information
- Born: 15 October 1970 (age 56) Lugo, Italy

Cycling career
- Sport: Cycling
- Current team: Retired
- Discipline: Road
- Role: Rider

Professional teams
- 1996–1997: Scrigno–Blue Storm
- 1998: Amore & Vita–ForzArcore
- 1999–2001: Cantina Tollo–Alexia Alluminio
- 2002: Acqua & Sapone
- 2003: Domina Vacanze–Elitron
- 2003: Mercatone Uno–Scanavino
- 2004: Landbouwkrediet–Colnago
- 2005–2006: Naturino–Sapore di Mare
- 2007: Ceramica Flaminia–Bossini Docce

Cristian Gasperoni (born 15 October 1970 in Lugo) is an Italian former cyclist. He rode in seven editions of the Giro d'Italia.

== Major results ==
1996
1st Stage 3 Tour de Suisse
1998
1st Overall Tour de l'Ain

1st Stage 2

8th GP Città di Camaiore
1999
1st Overall Giro d'Abruzzo

1st Stage 1

1st Stage 7 Vuelta a Argentina
2000
2nd Giro della Provincia di Lucca
2001
8th Giro di Toscana
2002
3rd Giro del Lazio
3rd Gran Premio di Chiasso
2003
8th GP Città di Camaiore
2006
3rd Overall Peace Race
7th Overall Settimana Internazionale Coppi e Bartali
8th Giro di Toscana
