= Gran Premio Industrie del Marmo =

Italian one-day road cycling race

Race details
- Date: April/May
- Region: Massa-Carrara, Italy
- Discipline: Road race
- Competition: UCI Europe Tour
- Type: Single day race
- Organiser: SC Fausto Coppi

History
- First edition: 1988
- Editions: 37 (as of 2026)
- First winner: Davide Perona (ITA)
- Most wins: Matej Mugerli (SLO) (2 wins)
- Most recent: Matteo Gialli (ITA)

The Gran Premio Industrie del Marmo is a professional one day cycling race held annually in Italy. It is part of UCI Europe Tour in category 1.2.

== Winners ==
Year	Country	Rider	Team
1988	Italy	Davide Perona	
1989	Italy	Giuseppe Geraci	
1990	Italy	Massimo Donati	
1991	Italy	Sergio Barbero	
1992	Italy	Simone Biasci	
1993	Italy	Alessandro Baronti	
1994	Italy	Andrea Vatteroni	
1995	Italy	Roberto Giucolsi	
1996	Italy	Gabriele Balducci	
1997	Italy	Oscar Cavagnis	
1998	Italy	Maurizio Bachini	
1999	Australia	Tom Leaper	
2000	Italy	Simone Cadamuro	
2001	Italy	Nicola Pavone	
2002	Italy	Ezio Casagrande	
2003	Italy	Cristian Tosoni	
2004	Slovenia	Matej Mugerli	
2005	Italy	Alessio Signego	
2006	Italy	David Garbelli	
2007	Russia	Anton Rechetnikov	Russia (national team)
2008	Italy	Simone Stortoni	Lucchini Neri Comauto Cocif
2009	Brazil	Carlos Manarelli	Marchiol–Pasta Montegrappa–Site–Heraclia
2010	Italy	Tomas Alberio	U.C. Trevigiani–Dynamon–Bottoli
2011	Brazil	Rafael Andriato	Petroli Firenze
2012	Italy	Thomas Fiumana	Petroli Firenze
2013	Italy	Luca Benedetti	Futura Team
2014	Slovenia	Matej Mugerli	Adria Mobil
2015	Italy	Gianmarco Di Francesco	MG.K Vis–Vega
2016	Italy	Damiano Cima	Viris Maserati Sisal Chiaravalli
2017	Australia	Michael Storer	Australia (national team)
2018	Italy	Gregorio Ferri	Zalf–Euromobil–Désirée–Fior
2019	Austria	Patrick Gamper	Tirol KTM Cycling Team
2020– 2021	No race due to the COVID-19 pandemic in Italy		
2022	Italy	Alessio Martinelli	Bardiani–CSF–Faizanè
2023	Italy	Christian Bagatin	Sias–Rime
2024	Italy	Tommaso Dati	Biesse–Carrera
2025	Russia	Ilya Savekin	PC Baix Ebre
2026	Italy	Matteo Gialli	Hopplà–Petroli Firenze–Don Camillo
