= Giro del Belvedere =

Italian one-day road cycling race

Race details
- Date: April
- Region: Treviso province
- Discipline: Road race
- Competition: UCI Europe Tour
- Type: Single day race

History
- First edition: 1923
- Editions: 87 (as of 2026)
- First winner: Alfonso Piccin (ITA)
- Most wins: Claudio Zanchetta (ITA); Mosè Segato (ITA); Flavio Martini (ITA); Lorenzo Finn (ITA) (2 wins)
- Most recent: Lorenzo Finn (ITA)

The Giro del Belvedere is a professional cycling race held annually in the Treviso province, Italy. It has been part of the UCI Europe Tour since 2005 in category 1.2U, meaning it is reserved for U23 riders.

== Winners (since 2000) ==
Year	Country	Rider	Team
2000	Italy	Giampaolo Caruso	Vellutex Zoccorinese Toscana
2001	Ukraine	Yaroslav Popovych	Vellutex Record Cucine
2002	Italy	Devid Garbelli	Marchiol–Hit Casinos–Safi–Site–Frezza
2003	Russia	Alexandre Bazhenov	Cotto Ref
2004	Italy	Claudio Corioni	Egidio Unidelta
2005	Italy	Gianluca Coletta	Caneva Concrete–Cyberteam
2006	Italy	Fabrizio Galeazzi	Zalf–Désirée–Fior
2007	Italy	Simone Stortoni	Finauto Sport Team
2008	Italy	Davide Malacarne	Neri Lucchini Nuova Comauto
2009	Italy	Sacha Modolo	Zalf–Désirée–Fior
2010	Belarus	Siarhei Papok	Concrete San Marco Imet Caneva
2011	Italy	Nicola Boem	Zalf–Désirée–Fior
2012	Italy	Daniele Dall'Oste	U.C. Trevigiani–Dynamon–Bottoli
2013	Switzerland	Stefan Küng	BMC Development Team
2014	Italy	Simone Andreetta	Zalf–Euromobil–Désirée–Fior
2015	Italy	Andrea Vendrame	Zalf–Euromobil–Désirée–Fior
2016	Switzerland	Patrick Müller	BMC Development Team
2017	Belarus	Aleksandr Riabushenko	Team Palazzago
2018	Australia	Robert Stannard	Mitchelton–BikeExchange
2019	Italy	Samuele Battistella	Team Dimension Data
2020	No race due to the COVID-19 pandemic		
2021	Spain	Juan Ayuso	Team Colpack–Ballan
2022	France	Romain Grégoire	Équipe Continentale Groupama–FDJ
2023	Norway	Johannes Staune-Mittet	Jumbo–Visma Development Team
2024	Slovenia	Gal Glivar	UAE Team Emirates Gen Z
2025	Italy	Lorenzo Finn	Red Bull–Bora–Hansgrohe Rookies
2026	Italy	Lorenzo Finn	Red Bull–Bora–Hansgrohe Rookies
