= Giro della Lunigiana =

Cycling competition

Race details
- Date: Early September
- Region: La Spezia, Liguria, Italy and Massa Carrara, Tuscany, Italy
- Discipline: Road race
- Competition: UCI Junior Men
- Type: Stage race
- Web site: girodellalunigiana.org

History
- First edition: 1975
- Editions: 48 (as of 2024)
- First winner: Corrado Donadio (ITA)
- Most wins: No repeat winners
- Most recent: Paul Seixas (FRA)

Giro della Lunigiana is a four-day road bicycle race for junior men (age 17 and 18) in the historical territory Lunigiana (currently the provinces of La Spezia and Massa Carrara), Italy. The race, class 2.1 MJ on the UCI calendar, counts as a big event in the junior men category. Famous Italian pro riders such as Gilberto Simoni, Danilo Di Luca, Damiano Cunego and Vincenzo Nibali won this race when they were juniors; as did future international stars including grand tour winners Tao Geoghegan Hart, Remco Evenepoel and Tadej Pogačar.

== Winners ==
Year	Country	Rider	Team
1975	Italy	Corrado Donadio	
1976	Italy	Ivano Maffei	
1977	Italy	Franco Chioccioli	
1978	Italy	Raniero Gradi	
1979	Italy	Silvio Rivieri	
1980	Soviet Union	Viktor Demidenko	
1981	Soviet Union	Oleg Petrovich Chuzhda	
1982	Soviet Union	Yuri Abramov	
1983	Denmark	Alex Pedersen	
1984	Italy	Gianluca Tonetti	
1985	Italy	Paolo Ricciuti	
1986	Italy	Gianluca Bortolami	
1987	Italy	Stefano Zanini	
1988	Italy	Giuseppe Guerini	
1989	Italy	Gilberto Simoni	
1990	Soviet Union	Pavel Cherkasov	
1991	Soviet Union	Andrey Mizurov	
1992	Italy	Marzio Bruseghin	
1993	Russia	Vitaly Kokorin	
1994	Italy	Danilo Di Luca	
1995	Italy	Alessandro Brendolin	
1996	Italy	Claudio Astolfi	
1997	Netherlands	Roel Egelmeers	
1998	Italy	Damiano Cunego	
1999	Russia	Alexandr Kolobnev	
2000	Russia	Alexander Arekeev	
2001	Ukraine	Oleksandr Kvachuk	
2002	Italy	Vincenzo Nibali	
2003	Italy	Valerio Agnoli	
2004	Netherlands	Rob Ruijgh	
2005	Denmark	Thomas Kvist	
2006	Italy	Daniele Ratto	
2007	Italy	Giorgio Cecchinel	Vittorio Veneto
2008	Austria	Stefan Mair	Austria (national team)
2009	Italy	Simone Antonini	G.S. Stabbia
2010	Kazakhstan	Maxat Ayazbayev	Kazakhstan (national team)
2011	Italy	Alberto Bettiol	G.S. Stabbia
2012	Slovenia	Matej Mohorič	Hit Casinos
2013	Great Britain	Tao Geoghegan Hart	Great Britain (national team)
2014	No race		
2015	Italy	Daniel Savini	Team Romagnano Guerciotti
2016	Slovenia	Tadej Pogačar	Radenska–Ljubljana
2017	Italy	Andrea Innocenti	G.S. Stabbia
2018	Belgium	Remco Evenepoel	Acrog–Pauwels Sauzen
2019	Italy	Andrea Piccolo	Team Lvf
2020	No race due to COVID-19 pandemic		
2021	France	Lenny Martinez	CC Varennes-Vauzelles
2022	Portugal	António Morgado	Bairrada Cycling Team
2023	France	Léo Bisiaux	France (national team)
2024	France	Paul Seixas	France (national team)
