= Trofeo Edil C =

Cycling race in Italy

Race details
- Date: April
- Region: Parma, Italy
- Discipline: Road
- Competition: UCI Europe Tour
- Type: one-day race
- Organiser: G.S. Virtus Collecchio
- Web site: www.gsvirtuscollecchio.com/1/trofeo_edil_c_3978228.html

History
- First edition: 1997
- Editions: 23
- Final edition: 2019
- First winner: Federico Giabbecucci (ITA)
- Most wins: No repeat winners
- Final winner: Giovanni Aleotti (ITA)

Trofeo Edil C was an annual one-day cycling race held in the Collecchio commune of Province of Parma, Italy. It was being organized by G.S. Virtus Collecchio. In 2020 the race has been cancelled due to COVID-19 pandemic. The 2021 edition was cancelled as well due to COVID-19 restrictions. The last edition was rated 1.2 and was part of UCI Europe Tour.

== Winners ==
Year	Country	Rider	Team
1997	Italy	Federico Giabbecucci	
1998	Italy	Michele Colleoni	
1999	Italy	Alessandro Cortinovis	
2000	Italy	Cristiano Parrinello	
2001	Italy	Michele Maccanti	
2002	Ukraine	Roman Luhovyy	
2003	Italy	Mirco Lorenzetto	
2004	Italy	Fabrice Piemontesi	
2005	Belarus	Vasil Kiryienka	
2006	Italy	Maurizio Biondo	
2007	Italy	Paolo Tomaselli	
2008	Italy	Cesare Benedetti	
2009	Italy	Tomas Alberio	
2010	Italy	Massimo Graziato	
2011	Italy	Mattia Pozzo	
2012	Italy	Kristian Sbaragli	
2013	Italy	Andrea Zordan	
2014	Italy	Andrea Vaccher	Marchiol-Emisfero
2015	Italy	Francesco Reda	Team Idea 2010 ASD
2016	Italy	Vincenzo Albanese	
2017	Italy	Marco Negrente	Team Colpack
2018	Italy	Alessandro Fedeli	Trevigiani Phonix–Hemus 1896
2019	Italy	Giovanni Aleotti	Cycling Team Friuli
