= Trofeo Internazionale Bastianelli =

Italian cycling race

Race details
- Date: August
- Region: Atina, Lazio
- Discipline: Road race
- Competition: UCI Europe Tour
- Type: Single day race
- Organiser: GS Sabina

History
- First edition: 1977
- Editions: 40 (as of 2016)
- First winner: Vincenzo Pannone (ITA)
- Most wins: No repeat winners
- Most recent: Michele Gazzara (ITA)

The Trofeo Internazionale Bastianelli is a professional one day cycling race held annually in Italy. It is part of UCI Europe Tour in category 1.2.

== Winners ==
Year	Country	Rider	Team
2005	Italy	Davide Torosantucci	Universal Caffè
2006	Italy	Rocco Capasso	
2007	Italy	Francesco De Bonis	
2008	Great Britain	Peter Kennaugh	100% Me
2009	Croatia	Radoslav Rogina	Loborika
2010	Italy	Carmelo Pantò	U.C. Trevigiani–Dynamon–Bottoli
2011	Croatia	Kristijan Đurasek	Loborika Favorit Team
2012	Italy	Luigi Miletta	Gragnano Sporting Club
2013	Kazakhstan	Maxat Ayazbayev	Astana Continental Team
2014	Italy	Nicola Gaffurini	Vega-Hotsand
2015	Italy	Michele Gazzara	MG.Kvis Vega
