= Biesse–Carrera =

Italian cycling team

Team information
- UCI code: BIC (2018–2019); BIA (2020–2021); BIE (2022–)
- Registered: Italy
- Founded: 2003
- Discipline: Road
- Status: UCI Continental

Team name history
- 2003–2005; 2006–2008; 2009–2014; 2015–2017; 2018; 2019; 2020–2021; 2022–: G.S. Gavardo Tecmor; ASD G.S. Gavardo–Tecmor; G.S. Gavardo–Tecmor ASD; G.S. Gavardo–Bi&Esse ASD; Biesse Carrera Gavardo; Biesse–Carrera; Biesse Arvedi; Biesse–Carrera

Biesse–Carrera is an Italian cycling team founded in 2003 which ultimately became a UCI Continental-level team in 2018. It participates in UCI Continental Circuits races.

== Team roster ==
As of 1 May 2023.

Rider	Date of birth
Nicolò Arrighetti (ITA)	23 December 2004 (age 21)
Michael Belleri (ITA)	13 May 1999 (age 27)
Pierelis Belletta (ITA)	5 February 1999 (age 27)
Riccardo Ciuccarelli (ITA)	22 January 2000 (age 26)
Andrea D'Amato (ITA)	14 November 2002 (age 23)
Anders Foldager (DEN)	27 July 2001 (age 25)
Matteo Frosio (ITA)	7 March 2004 (age 22)

Rider	Date of birth
Francesco Galimberti (ITA)	2 January 2001 (age 25)
Lorenzo Galimberti (ITA)	2 January 2001 (age 25)
Alessandro Motta (ITA)	3 March 2002 (age 24)
Marco Oliosi (ITA)	11 May 2004 (age 22)
Lorenzo Rinaldi (ITA)	1 September 2003 (age 23)
Giacomo Villa (ITA)	29 January 2002 (age 24)

== Major results ==
2018
Trofeo Alcide Degasperi, Simone Ravanelli
2021
Stage 3 Giro Ciclistico d'Italia, Alessio Bonelli
Stage 8 Giro Ciclistico d'Italia, Riccardo Ciuccarelli
Gran Premio Sportivi di Poggiana, Riccardo Ciuccarelli
2023
Trofeo Piva, Giacomo Villa
Trofeo Città di San Vendemiano, Anders Foldager
