= Giro del Medio Brenta =

Cycling race

Race details
- Date: July
- Region: Veneto
- Discipline: Road race
- Competition: UCI Europe Tour
- Type: Single day race
- Organiser: Veloce Club Villa del Conte
- Web site: girodelmediobrenta.my.canva.site

History
- First edition: 1986
- Editions: 39 (as of 2026)
- First winner: Giorgio Furlan (ITA)
- Most wins: Michele Gazzara (ITA) (2 wins)
- Most recent: Davide De Cassan (ITA)

The Giro del Medio Brenta is a professional one day cycling race held annually in Veneto, Italy. It has been part of the UCI Europe Tour since 2005 in category 1.2.

== Winners ==
Year	Country	Rider	Team
1986	Italy	Giorgio Furlan	Arredo House-ZG Mobili
1987	Italy	Dario Bottaro	Suprema Ballan
1988	Italy	Giuliano Pavanello	
1989	Italy	Cristian Zanolini	
1990	Italy	Paolo Lanfranchi	Zalf–Euromobil–Fior
1991	Italy	Valerio Galeazzi	
1992	Italy	Gilberto Simoni	
1993	Italy	Ilario Scremin	
1994	Italy	Mirko Lauria	
1995	Italy	Claudio Camin	Zalf–Euromobil–Fior
1996	Italy	Marco Gili	
1997	Italy	Marco Serpellini	Brescialat–Oyster
1998	Italy	Matteo Tosatto	Ballan
1999	Italy	Devis Miorin	
2000	Italy	Matteo Carrara	UC Bergamasca 1902–For 3
2001	Slovenia	Saša Sviben	Stabil–Steiermark
2002	Italy	Damiano Cunego	Saeco–Longoni Sport
2003	Poland	Przemysław Niemiec	Amore & Vita–Beretta
2004	Ukraine	Ruslan Pidhornyy	LPR–Piacenza
2005	Italy	Manuele Spadi	Ceramica Flaminia
2006	No race		
2007	Italy	Adriano Angeloni	Ceramica Flaminia–Bossini Docce
2008	Slovenia	Robert Vrečer	Radenska–KD Financial Point
2009	Italy	Christian Delle Stelle	Bottoli Nordelettrica Ramonda
2010	Italy	Luigi Miletta	Gragnano Sporting Club
2011	Italy	Moreno Moser	Lucchini Maniva Ski
2012	Italy	Matteo Busato	Team Idea
2013	Italy	Federico Rocchetti	Utensilnord Ora24.eu
2014	Slovenia	Klemen Štimulak	Adria Mobil
2015	Italy	Michele Gazzara	MG.K Vis–Vega
2016	Italy	Fausto Masnada	Team Colpack
2018	Russia	Alexander Evtushenko	Lokosphinx
2019	Italy	Simone Ravanelli	Biesse–Carrera
2020	No race		
2021	Colombia	Didier Merchán	Colombia Tierra de Atletas–GW Bicicletas
2022	Italy	Thomas Pesenti	Beltrami TSA–Tre Colli
2023	Italy	Giulio Pellizzari	Green Project–Bardiani–CSF–Faizanè
2024	Italy	Sergio Meris	Team MBH Bank Colpack Ballan
2025	Italy	Filippo Turconi	VF Group–Bardiani–CSF–Faizanè
2026	Italy	Davide De Cassan	General Store–Essegibi–Fratelli Curia
