= Toscana-Terra di Ciclismo =

Annual cycling race in Italy

Race details
- Date: February (2011–2012); April (2017–)
- Region: Tuscany
- English name: Tuscany-Land of Cycling
- Discipline: Road race
- Competition: UCI Europe Tour
- Type: Stage race

History
- First edition: 2011
- Editions: 4 (as of 2018)
- First winner: Georg Preidler (AUT)
- Most wins: No repeat winners
- Most recent: Andrea Bagioli (ITA)

Toscana-Terra di Ciclismo is a cycling race held annually in Italy. It was part of UCI Europe Tour, as a category 2.ncup race, in 2011 and 2012, meaning it was part of the UCI Under 23 Nations' Cup After a four-year hiatus, the race was organised again in 2017, as a 2.2U race, again restricting to competitors under the age of 23.

== Winners ==
Year	Country	Rider	Team
2011	Austria	Georg Preidler	Austria (national team)
2012	Italy	Fabio Aru	Italy (national team)
2013– 2016	No race		
2017	Australia	Jai Hindley	Australia (national team)
2018	Italy	Andrea Bagioli	Team Colpack
