= Trofeo Città di San Vendemiano =

Italian one-day road cycling race

Race details
- Date: April/May
- Region: Veneto
- Discipline: Road race
- Competition: UCI Europe Tour
- Type: Single day race
- Organiser: VC San Vendemiano
- Web site: www.veloclubsanvendemiano.it/eventi.htm

History
- First edition: 1947
- Editions: 66 (as of 2026)
- First winner: Giovanni Sem (ITA)
- Most wins: Carlo Tonon (ITA); Mirko Gualdi (ITA) (2 wins)
- Most recent: Jan Jackowiak (POL)

The Trofeo Città di San Vendemiano is an under-23 one day cycling race held annually in Italy. It is part of UCI Europe Tour in category 1.2U.

== Winners ==
Year	Winner	Second	Third
Gran Premio Industria e Commercio di San Vendemiano
1947	(Italy) Giovanni Sem		
1948–1951	No race		
1952	(Italy) Giuseppe Fornasiero		
1953	No race		
1954	(Italy) Alfredo Sabbadin		
1955	No race		
1956	(Italy) Pietro Zoppas		
1957	No race		
1958	(Italy) Mario Vallotto		
1959–1965	No race		
1966	(Italy) Gianfranco Bianchin		
1967	(Italy) Giannino Bianco		
1968	(Italy) Marino Conton		
1969	(Italy) Loris Zampieri		
1970	(Italy) Selvino Poloni		
1971	(Italy) Enzo Brentegani		
1972	(Italy) Dorini Vanzo		
1973	(Italy) Adriano Brunello		
1974	(Italy) Luigino Dassie		
1975	(Italy) Emiel Gijsemans		
1976	(Italy) Natalino Bonan		
1977	(Italy) Carlo Tonon		
1978	(Italy) Nazzareno Berto		
1979	(Italy) Gastone Martini		
1980	(Italy) Carlo Tonon		
1981	(Italy) Claudio Argentin		
1982	(Italy) Sergio Scremin		
1983	(Italy) Maurizio Volpato		
1984	(Italy) Luciano Bottaro		
1985	(Italy) Fabio Parise		
1986	(Italy) Silvano Lorenzon		
1987	(Italy) Fausto Boreggio		
1988	(Italy) Stefano Checchin		
1989	(Italy) Dario Bottaro	(Italy) Ivan Parolin	(Italy) Stefano Cattai
1990	(Italy) Mirko Gualdi	(Italy) William Chiementin	(Italy) Sergio Girardi
1991	(Italy) Gabriele Valentini	(Italy) Daniele Sgnaolin	(Italy) Sandro Modonutti
1992	(Italy) Mirko Gualdi	(Italy) Marco Rosani	(Italy) Paolo Lanfranchi
1993	(Italy) Luca Prada	(Italy) Denis Zanette	(Italy) Roberto Menegotto
1994	(Italy) Daniele Giacomin	(Italy) Ilario Scremin	(Italy) Luca Prada
1995	(Italy) Marco Fincato	(Italy) Michele Favaron	(Italy) Michele Bedin
1996	(Italy) Marzio Bruseghin	(Italy) Rodolfo Ongarato	(Italy) Alessandro Romio
1997	(Italy) Ivan Basso	(Slovakia) Jan Valach	(Italy) Massimo Mestriner
1998	(Russia) Oleg Grishkine	(Italy) Emanuele Negrini	(Italy) Gianluca Nicole
1999	(Italy) Michele Michielin	(Ukraine) Olexandr Klimenko	(Russia) Andrei Karpatchev
2000	(Socialist Federal Republic of Yugoslavia) Aleksandar Nikačević	(Italy) Giancarlo Ginestri	(Italy) Manuel Bortolotto
2001	(Italy) Stefano Lugana	(Uzbekistan) Sergey Krushevskiy	(Italy) Alessandro Ballan
2002	(Italy) Ivan Ravaioli	(Italy) Ezio Casagrande	(Italy) Claudio Corioni
2003	(Italy) Giancarlo Ginestri	(Italy) Emanuele Sella	(Italy) Nicola Scattolin
2004	(Italy) Fabrizio Galeazzi	(Slovenia) Matej Mugerli	(Lithuania) Drąsutis Stundžia
2005	(Italy) Nicola Del Puppo	(Lithuania) Drąsutis Stundžia	(Italy) Davide Bragazzi
2006	(Russia) Maxim Belkov	(Italy) Davide Battistella	(Italy) Massimiliano Turco
2007	(Italy) Sacha Modolo	(Moldova) Oleg Berdos	(Italy) Alessandro Garziera
Trofeo Città di San Vendemiano
2008	(Australia) Simon Clarke	(Italy) Giorgio Cecchinel	(Slovenia) Blaž Furdi
2009	(Italy) Alessandro Mazzi	(Italy) Thomas Tiozzo	(Italy) Enrico Battaglin
2010	(Italy) Stefano Agostini	(Italy) Andrea Vaccher	(Italy) Enrico Battaglin
2011	(Italy) Michele Gazzara	(Italy) Mario Sgrinzato	(Australia) Patrick Lane
2012	(Italy) Enrico Barbin	(Italy) Daniele Dall'Oste	(Czech Republic) Jakub Novák
2013	(Slovenia) Mark Džamastagič	(Slovenia) Tim Mikelj	(Italy) Gianluca Miliani
2014	(Italy) Giacomo Berlato	(Australia) Caleb Ewan	(Italy) Simone Andreetta
2015	(Italy) Gianni Moscon	(Italy) Stefano Nardelli	(Australia) Robert Power
2016	(Italy) Simone Consonni	(Italy) Filippo Ganna	(Italy) Nicola Bagioli
2017	(Italy) Nicola Conci	(Australia) Jai Hindley	(Republic of Ireland) Eddie Dunbar
2018	(Italy) Alberto Dainese	(Italy) Francesco Romano	(Italy) Francesco Di Felice
2019	(Italy) Andrea Bagioli	(Italy) Martin Marcellusi	(Italy) Marco Murgano
2020	(Italy) Antonio Tiberi	(Italy) Kevin Colleoni	(Italy) Matteo Baseggio
2021	(France) Paul Lapeira	(Italy) Jacopo Menegotto	(Italy) Mattia Petrucci
2022	(Italy) Federico Guzzo	(Croatia) Fran Miholjević	(Colombia) Germán Darío Gómez
2023	(Denmark) Anders Foldager	(Italy) Andrea Debiasi	(Italy) Giosuè Epis
2024	(Italy) Florian Kajamini	(Italy) Nicoló Arrighetti	(Italy) Ludovico Crescioli
2025	(Austria) Marco Schrettl	(Italy) José Juan Prieto	(Italy) Filippo Agostinacchio
2026	(Poland) Jan Jackowiak	(Italy) Diego Nembrini	(Italy) Alessandro Cattani
