= Gran Premio di Poggiana =

Italian one-day cycling race

Race details
- Date: August
- Region: Poggiana
- Discipline: Road race
- Competition: UCI Europe Tour
- Type: Single day race
- Web site: www.gppoggiana.net

History
- First edition: 1975
- Editions: 50 (as of 2026)
- First winner: Luigi Trevellin (ITA)
- Most wins: Mattia Cattaneo (ITA) 2 wins
- Most recent: Nicolas Milesi (ITA)

The Gran Premio Sportivi di Poggiana is a professional one day cycling race held annually in Poggiana, Italy. It has been part of the UCI Europe Tour since 2011 in category 1.2U.

== Winners ==
Year	Country	Rider	Team
2009	Italy	Mattia Cattaneo	Bottoli Nordelettrica Ramonda
2010	Great Britain	Luke Rowe	Rapha Condor–Sharp
2011	Italy	Mattia Cattaneo	U.C. Trevigiani–Dynamon–Bottoli
2012	Australia	Adam Phelan	Drapac Cycling
2013	Italy	Andrea Zordan	Zalf Euromobil Désirée Fior
2014	Australia	Robert Power	Jayco-AIS World Tour Academy
2015	Italy	Stefano Nardelli	Unieuro–Wilier
2016	Australia	Michael Storer	Jayco-AIS World Tour Academy
2017	Italy	Nicola Conci	Zalf Euromobil Désirée Fior
2018	Australia	Robert Stannard	Mitchelton–BikeExchange
2019	Italy	Fabio Mazzucco	Sangemini–MG.K Vis
2020	No race		
2021	Italy	Riccardo Ciuccarelli	Biesse–Arvedi
2022	Italy	Nicolò Buratti	Cycling Team Friuli ASD
2023	Italy	Nicolò Pettiti	Sias–Rime
2024	Norway	Jørgen Nordhagen	Visma–Lease a Bike Development
2025	Italy	Matteo Scalco	VF Group–Bardiani–CSF–Faizanè
2026	Italy	Nicolas Milesi	INEOS Grenadiers Racing Academy
