= Coppa della Pace =

Italian one-day road cycling race

Race details
- Date: May or June
- Region: Emilia-Romagna, Italy
- English name: Peace Cup
- Discipline: Road race
- Competition: UCI Europe Tour
- Type: Single day race
- Organiser: Pedale Riminese; Polisportiva Sant'Ermete
- Web site: www.fratellianelli.com/coppadellapace

History
- First edition: 1971
- Editions: 53 (as of 2025)
- First winner: Davide Ruscelli (ITA)
- Most wins: Davide Carli (ITA) (2 wins)
- Most recent: Diego Bracalente (ITA)

The Coppa della Pace is a professional one day cycling race held annually in Italy. It is part of UCI Europe Tour in category 1.2.

== Winners ==
Year	Winner	Second	Third
1971	Davide Ruscelli (ITA)	Paolo Bernabini (ITA)	Pasquale Amadio (ITA)
1972	Mauro Ubaldini (ITA)	Mauro Frani (ITA)	Marco Sacchini (ITA)
1973	Adriano Zannoni (ITA)	Guido Bosi (ITA)	Claudio Emaldi (ITA)
1974	Clyde Sefton (AUS)	Gilberto Romagnoli (ITA)	Claudio Emaldi (ITA)
1975	Alfio Vandi (ITA)	Maurizio Bertini (ITA)	Giancarlo Turci (ITA)
1976	Not contested		
1977	Daniele Caroli (ITA)	Ercole Borzini (ITA)	Mario Ceccaroni (SMR)
1978	Marco Vitali (ITA)	Fausto Lambruschi (ITA)	Fabrizio Romagnoli (ITA)
1979	Claudio Savini (ITA)	Michele Fabbri (ITA)	Claudio Toselli (ITA)
1980	Ercole Borghini (ITA)	Marco Vitali (ITA)	Michele Fabbri (ITA)
1981	Filippo Piersanti (ITA)	Stefano Boni (ITA)	Davide Cassani (ITA)
1982	Fabio Patuelli (ITA)	Piergiorgio Angeli (ITA)	Marco Ronchiato (ITA)
1983	Massimo Liverani (ITA)	Maurizio Umbri (ITA)	Claudio Santi (ITA)
1984	Francesco Rossignoli (ITA)	Stefano Arlotti (ITA)	Valerio Franceschini (ITA)
1985	Stefano Arlotti (ITA)	Maurizio Vandelli (ITA)	Claudio Umbri (ITA)
1986	Davide Carli (ITA)	William Dazzani (ITA)	Gabriele Bezzi (ITA)
1987	Davide Carli (ITA)	Gianni Pigato (ITA)	Stefano Arlotti (ITA)
1988	Andrea Moretti (ITA)	Fabiano Fontanelli (ITA)	Remo Zauli (ITA)
1989	Davide Negrini (ITA)	Gianluca Bordignon (ITA)	Alessandro Tassioli (ITA)
1990	Stefano Sartori (ITA)	Sergio Girardi (ITA)	Gabriele Missaglia (ITA)
1991	Giampaolo Verdi (ITA)	Davide Dall'Olio (ITA)	Angelo Manghino (ITA)
1992	Filippo Simeoni (ITA)	Massimiliano Gentili (ITA)	Cristian Gasperoni (ITA)
1993	Davide Dall'Olio (ITA)	Dario Frigo (ITA)	Oscar Ferrero (ITA)
1994	Giuseppe Tartaggia (ITA)	Massimo Giunti (ITA)	Robin Torsoli (ITA)
1995	Paolo Savoldelli (ITA)	Ivano Zuccotti (ITA)	Cristian Gasperoni (ITA)
1996	Gabriele Balducci (ITA)	Luca Mazzanti (ITA)	Alessandro Spezialetti (ITA)
1997	Maurizio Caravaggio (ITA)	Michele Colleoni (ITA)	Filippo Baldo (ITA)
1998	Paolo Bossoni (ITA)	Denis Lunghi (ITA)	Valentino China (ITA)
1999	Martin Derganc (SVN)	Fabio Bulgarelli (ITA)	Dimitry Gainetdinov (RUS)
2000	Evgeni Petrov (RUS)	Dimitry Gainetdinov (RUS)	Guido Balbis (ITA)
2001	Guido Balbis (ITA)	Andrea Moletta (ITA)	Alexandr Kolobnev (RUS)
2002	Alexander Bespalov (RUS)	Alexander Arekeev (RUS)	Daniele Pietropolli (ITA)
2003	Riccardo Riccò (ITA)	Massimo Ianetti (ITA)	Rosario Ferlito (ITA)
2004	Błażej Janiaczyk (POL)	Alexey Esin (RUS)	Micula De Matteis (ITA)
2005	Vasil Kiryienka (BLR)	Gene Bates (AUS)	Davide Bragazzi (ITA)
2006	Alexander Filippov (RUS)	Maurizio Biondo (ITA)	Yauhen Sobal (BLR)
2007	Marco Cattaneo (ITA)	Marco Da Castagnori (ITA)	Alberto Contoli (ITA)
2008	Ben Swift (GBR)	Adriano Malori (ITA)	Jarosław Marycz (POL)
2009	Egor Silin (RUS)	Pavel Kochetkov (RUS)	Richie Porte (AUS)
2010	Fabio Piscopiello (ITA)	Manuele Boaro (ITA)	Andrei Nichita (ROU)
2011	Andrey Solomennikov (RUS)	Vyacheslav Kuznetsov (RUS)	Maksym Averin (UKR)
2012	Ruslan Tleubayev (KAZ)	Paweł Poljański (POL)	Enrico Barbin (ITA)
2013	Alessio Taliani (ITA)	Graziano Di Luca (ITA)	Davide Formolo (ITA)
2014	Luca Ceolan (ITA)	Daniel Pearson (GBR)	Paolo Totò (ITA)
2015	Simone Velasco (ITA)	José Tito Hernández (COL)	Aleksandr Vlasov (RUS)
2016	Race abandoned due to Keagan Girdlestone's accident		
2017	Nicola Gaffurini (ITA)	Amanuel Ghebreigzabhier (ERI)	Nicolae Tanovițchii (MDA)
2018	Matteo Sobrero (ITA)	Giacomo Garavaglia (ITA)	Raul Colombo (ITA)
2019	Georg Zimmermann (GER)	Luca Rastelli (ITA)	Filippo Zana (ITA)
2020	No race due to the COVID-19 pandemic in Italy		
2021	Daan Hoole (NED)	Stan Van Tricht (BEL)	Federico Guzzo (ITA)
2022	Federico Guzzo (ITA)	Pierre-Pascal Keup (GER)	Walter Calzoni (ITA)
2023	Matteo Scalco (ITA)	Tommaso Bergagna (ITA)	Artem Shmidt (USA)
2024	Kevin Pezzo Rosola (ITA)	Travis Stedman (RSA)	Lorenzo Peschi (ITA)
2025	Diego Bracalente (ITA)	Paul Fietzke (GER)	Kevin Biehl (DEN)
