= Trevigiani Phonix–Hemus 1896 =

Cycling team

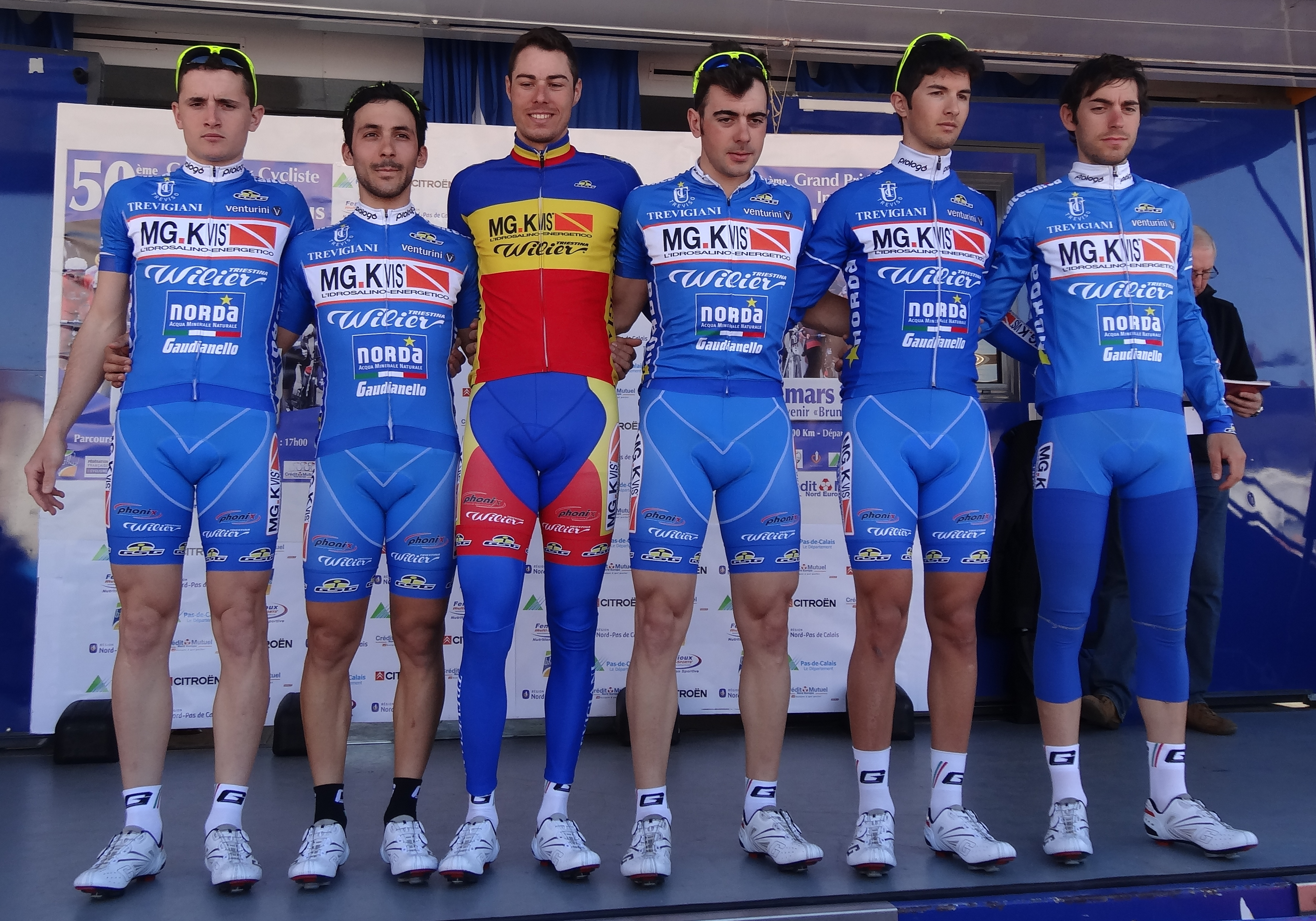

Team information
- UCI code: UNI
- Registered: Italy (2014–2016); Bulgaria (2017–2018)
- Founded: 2014
- Disbanded: 2018
- Discipline: Road
- Status: UCI Continental
- Bicycles: Wilier Triestina

Team name history
- 2014 2014 2015–2016 2017 2018: MG Kvis–Trevigiani; MG Kvis–Wilier; Unieuro Wilier Trevigiani; Unieuro Trevigiani–Hemus 1896; Trevigiani Phonix–Hemus 1896

Trevigiani Phonix–Hemus 1896 was a Bulgarian UCI Continental team active from 2014 to 2018. It was based in Italy from 2014 to 2016.

== 2018 team roster ==
Rider	Date of birth
Abderrahim Zahiri (MAR)	1 January 1996 (age 30)
Floryan Arnoult (FRA)	10 March 1996 (age 30)
Aleks Bechkov (BUL)	14 February 1999 (age 27)
Stanimir Cholakov (BUL)	17 December 1991 (age 34)
Alessandro Fedeli (ITA)	2 March 1996 (age 30)
Christofer Jurado (PAN)	27 October 1995 (age 30)
Teodor Kolev (BUL)	19 October 1999 (age 26)
Fabio Mazzucco (ITA)	14 April 1999 (age 27)

Rider	Date of birth
Mihail Mihaylov (BUL)	19 September 1997 (age 28)
Javier Montoya (COL)	17 October 1997 (age 28)
Konstantin Nikolov (BUL)	24 May 1999 (age 27)
Manuel Peñalver (ESP)	10 December 1998 (age 27)
Germán Tivani (ARG)	31 October 1995 (age 30)
Adrian Enrique Vargas Pinto (COL)	15 May 1998 (age 28)
Filippo Zana (ITA)	18 March 1999 (age 27)

== Major wins ==
2014
Stage 1 Vuelta al Táchira, Rino Gasparrini
Stage 4 Okolo Slovenska, Christian Delle Stelle
Stage 1 Tour de Serbie, Liam Bertazzo
Romania National Time Trial championships, Andrei Nechita
Overall Kreiz Breizh Elites, Matteo Busato
2015
Gran Premio della Liberazione, Lucas Gaday
Overall Ronde de l'Isard, Simone Petilli

Stage 1, Simone Petilli

Gran Premio di Poggiana, Stefano Nardelli
2016
Stages 3, 4 & 6 Tour du Maroc, Matteo Malucelli
Stage 7 Tour du Maroc, Alex Turrin
Tour de Berne, Enrico Salvador
Overall Okolo Slovenska, Mauro Finetto

Stage 1, Matteo Malucelli
Stage 2, Mauro Finetto

Coppa Città di Offida, Enrico Salvador
Overall Tour of Bulgaria, Marco Tecchio

Stage 3, Marco Tecchio

2017
Argentina National U23 Time Trial championships, Nicolás Tivani
Argentina National U23 Road Race championships, Nicolás Tivani
Stage 3 Tour of Mersin, João Almeida
Stage 2 Toscana-Terra di Ciclismo, João Almeida
2018
Trofeo Edil C, Alessandro Fedeli
Gran Premio della Liberazione, Alessandro Fedeli
Stage 1 Toscana-Terra di Ciclismo, Abderrahim Zahiri
Overall Tour de Serbie, Nicolás Tivani

Stage 1, Nicolás Tivani

Panama National Road Race championships, Christofer Jurado
Stage 3 Giro della Valle d'Aosta, Alessandro Fedeli
Stage 7 Tour of China I, Manuel Peñalver

== National champions ==
2014
Romania Time Trial Andrei Nechita
2017
Argentina U23 Road Race, Germán Tivani
Argentina U23 Time Trial, Germán Tivani
