= 2015 Androni Giocattoli–Venezuela season =

Androni Giocattoli–Venezuela
- 2015 season
- UCI code: AND
- Status: UCI Professional Continental
- Manager: Gianni Savio
- Main sponsor(s): Androni Giocattoli S.A.
- Based: Italy
- Bicycles: Bianchi
- Groupset: Shimano

Season victories
- One-day races: -
- Stage race overall: -
- Stage race stages: 7
- National Championships: 3

The 2015 season for Androni Giocattoli–Sidermec began in January at the Vuelta al Táchira. Androni Giocattoli–Venezuela is an Italian-registered UCI Professional Continental cycling team that participated in road bicycle racing events on the UCI Continental Circuits and when selected as a wildcard to UCI ProTour events.

== Team roster ==
Rider	Date of birth
Davide Appollonio (ITA)	2 June 1989 (aged 25)
Marco Bandiera (ITA)	12 June 1984 (aged 30)
Marco Benfatto (ITA)	6 January 1988 (aged 26)
Tiziano Dall'Antonia (ITA)	26 July 1983 (aged 31)
John Kronborg Ebsen (DEN)	15 November 1988 (aged 26)
Marco Frapporti (ITA)	30 March 1985 (aged 29)
Carlos Gálviz (VEN)	27 October 1989 (aged 25)
Oscar Gatto (ITA)	1 January 1985 (aged 30)
Yonder Godoy (VEN)	19 April 1993 (aged 21)
Carlos Gimenez (VEN)	7 May 1995 (aged 19)

Rider	Date of birth
Alberto Nardin (ITA)	30 April 1990 (aged 24)
Franco Pellizotti (ITA)	15 January 1978 (aged 36)
Jackson Rodríguez (VEN)	25 February 1985 (aged 29)
Emanuele Sella (ITA)	9 January 1981 (aged 33)
Simone Stortoni (ITA)	7 July 1985 (aged 29)
Fabio Taborre (ITA)	5 June 1985 (aged 29)
Alessio Taliani (ITA)	11 October 1990 (aged 24)
Serghei Țvetcov (MDA)	29 December 1988 (aged 26)
Gianfranco Zilioli (ITA)	5 March 1990 (aged 24)
Andrea Zordan (ITA)	11 July 1992 (aged 22)

Riders who joined the team for the 2015 season

Rider	2014 team
Davide Appollonio	Ag2r–La Mondiale
Marco Benfatto	neo-pro (Astana Continental Team)
John Kronborg Ebsen	neo-pro (CCN Cycling Team)
Oscar Gatto	Cannondale
Carlos Gimenez	neo-pro (Maltinti Lampadari-Banca Cambiano)
Alberto Nardin	neo-pro (team overall)
Simone Stortoni	Amore & Vita–Selle SMP
Fabio Taborre	Neri Sottoli
Serghei Țvetcov	neo-pro (Jelly Belly–Maxxis)

Riders who left the team during or after the 2014 season

Rider	2015 team
Manuel Belletti	Southeast Pro Cycling
Omar Bertazzo	
Matteo Di Serafino	
Patrick Facchini	
Johnny Hoogerland	Team Roompot
Carlos José Ochoa	
Antonino Parrinello	Area Zero
Diego Rosa	Astana
Nicola Testi	Team Cicli Taddei
Kenny van Hummel	Retired

== Season victories ==
Date	Race	Competition	Rider	Country	Location
13 January	Vuelta al Táchira, Stage 5	UCI America Tour	Carlos Gálviz (VEN)	Venezuela	San Juan de Colón
28 March	Settimana Internazionale di Coppi e Bartali, Stage 3	UCI Europe Tour	Francesco Chicchi (ITA)	Italy	Crevalcore
31 May	Giro d'Italia, Sprints classification	UCI World Tour	Marco Bandiera (ITA)	Italy	
31 May	Giro d'Italia, Premio della Fuga classification	UCI World Tour	Marco Bandiera (ITA)	Italy	
17 June	Vuelta a Venezuela, Stage 6	UCI America Tour	Francesco Chicchi (ITA)	Venezuela	Guanare
2 July	Sibiu Cycling Tour, Stage 1	UCI Europe Tour	Oscar Gatto (ITA)	Romania	Sibiu
4 July	Sibiu Cycling Tour, Stage 3	UCI Europe Tour	Alessio Taliani (ITA)	Romania	Bâlea Lake
5 July	Sibiu Cycling Tour, Stage 4	UCI Europe Tour	Oscar Gatto (ITA)	Romania	Sibiu
8 August	Tour of Szeklerland, Stage 3a	UCI Europe Tour	Serghei Țvetcov (ROM)	Romania	Hármaskereszt

=== Victory originally obtained by Appollonio but vacated ===
Date	Race	Competition	Country	Location
21 June	Tour of Slovenia, Points classification	UCI Europe Tour	Slovenia	

== National, Continental and World champions 2015 ==
Date	Discipline	Jersey	Rider	Country	Location
26 June	Venezuelan National Time Trial Champion		Yonder Godoy (VEN)	Venezuela	Valle de la Pascua
27 June	Romania National Time Trial Champion		Serghei Țvetcov (ROM)	Romania	Miercurea Ciuc
28 June	Romania National Road Race Champion		Serghei Țvetcov (ROM)	Romania	Miercurea Ciuc
