= Giro del Casentino =

Cycling race in Casentino Valley

Race details
- Date: July/August
- Region: Casentino, Italy
- English name: Tour of Casentino
- Discipline: Road
- Type: One-day race
- Organiser: UC Aretina 1907
- Race director: Enzo Amantini

History
- First edition: 1910
- Editions: 106 (as of 2023)
- First winner: Ugo Marzocchini (ITA)
- Most recent: Edoardo Zamperini (ITA)

The Giro del Casentino is a one-day road cycling race that has been held annually since 1910 in the Casentino, a valley in Arezzo. From 2005 through 2010, the competition was part of the UCI Europe Tour as a category 1.2 event. Since 2011 it has been reserved for amateur riders.

== Winners ==
Year	Winner	Second	Third
1910	(Italy) Ugo Marzocchini		
1911	(Italy) Pietro Avanzini		
1912	(Italy) Umberto Bellucci		
1913	(Italy) Pierino Savini		
1914	(Italy) Alfonso Aprile		
1915-1919	No race		
1920	(Italy) Attilio Livi		
1921	(Italy) Romolo Ermini		
1922	(Italy) Riccardo Gagliardi		
1923	(Italy) Angelo Gabrielli		
1924	(Italy) Marcello Neri		
1925	(Italy) Marcello Neri		
1926	(Italy) Ettore Meini		
1927	(Italy) Luigi Papeschi		
1928	(Italy) Mario Cipriani		
1929	(Italy) Novelli Fraschi		
1930	(Italy) Agostoni Bellandi		
1931	(Italy) Vasco Rossi		
1932	(Italy) Ascanio Arcangeli		
1933	(Italy) Cesare Del Gancia		
1934	(Italy) Gino Bartali		
1935	(Italy) Gino Centogambe		
1936	(Italy) Pietro Chiappini		
1937	(Italy) Secondo Magni		
1938	(Italy) Corrado Scatragli		
1939	(Italy) Fausto Coppi		
1940	(Italy) Luciano Pezzi		
1941	(Italy) Nedo Laghi		
1942	(Italy) Angelo Bessi		
1943	(Italy) Enzo Desideri		
1944-1945	No race		
1946	(Italy) Luciano Maggini		
1947	(Italy) Freido Pasquetti		
1948	(Italy) Luciani Frosini		
1949	(Italy) Lido Sartini		
1950	(Italy) Marcello Pellegrini		
1951	(Italy) Girardengo Bernardini		
1952	(Italy) Bruno Tognaccini		
1953	(Italy) Gastone Nencini		
1954	(Italy) Amaldo Alberti		
1955	(Italy) Oreste Pierazzini		
1956	(Italy) Alberto Emiliozzi		
1957	(Italy) Alvaro Giommoni		
1958	(Italy) Bruno Babini		
1959	(Italy) Bruno Mealli		
1960	(Italy) Guido Neri		
1961	(Italy) Gianfranco Gallon		
1962	(Italy) Pietro Partesotti		
1963	(Italy) Moreno Campigli		
1964	(Italy) Mario Lazzieri		
1965	(Italy) Maurizio Meschini		
1966	(Italy) Mario Mancini		
1967	(Italy) Gabriele Pisauri		
1968	(Italy) Amaldo Spadoni		
1969	(Italy) Stefano Tamberi		
1970	(Italy) Luigi Scorza		
1971	(Italy) Remo Boccolacci		
1972	(Italy) Valerio Cirri		
1973	(Italy) Roberto Rosani		
1974	(Italy) Franco Conti		
1975	(Italy) Philip Edwards		
1976	(Italy) Riccardo Becherini		
1977	(Italy) Walter Clivati		
1978	(Italy) Graziano Maccaferri		
1979	(Italy) Emilio Maestrelli		
1980	(Italy) Ivano Maffei		
1981	(Italy) Loretto Sabatini		
1982	(Italy) Marco Giovannetti		
1983	(Italy) Stefano Casagrande		
1984	(Italy) Marco Giovannetti		
1985	(Italy) Edoardo Rocchi		
1986	(Italy) Stefano Casagrande	(Italy) Antonio Fanelli	(Poland) Andrzej Serediuk
1987	No race		
1988	(Italy) Antonio Politano	(Italy) Stefano Polga	(Italy) Romeo Barlaffa
1989	(Italy) Stefano Santerini	(Italy) Luca Scinto	(Italy) Davide Tani
1990	(Italy) Andrea Ferrigato	(Italy) Gianluca Tarocco	(Italy) Simone Biasci
1991	(Italy) Paolo Fornaciari	(Italy) Roberto Petito	(Italy) Stefano Santerini
1992	(Italy) Giuseppe Bellino	(Italy) Francesco Casagrande	(Italy) Filippo Simeoni
1993	(Italy) Stefano Checchin	(Italy) Samuele Schiavana	(Italy) Gian Matteo Fagnini
1994	(Italy) Claudio Ainardi	(Italy) Lorenzo Di Silvestro	(Italy) Mauro Sandroni
1995	(Italy) Massimiliano Gentili	(Italy) Roberto Bianchini	(Italy) Marco Vergnani
1996	(Italy) Marzio Bruseghin	(Italy) Giuseppe Asero	(Italy) Luca Mazzanti
1997	(Italy) Aldo Zanetti	(Australia) Cadel Evans	(Italy) Giuliano Figueras
1998	(Italy) Fabio Quercioli	(Australia) Cadel Evans	(Italy) Rinaldo Nocentini
1999	(Italy) Michele Colleoni	(Italy) Lorenzo Bernucci	(Italy) Raffaele Illiano
2000	(Italy) Davide Lorenzini	(Ukraine) Yaroslav Popovych	(Italy) Matteo Gigli
2001	(Italy) Lorenzo Bernucci	(Italy) Santo Anzà	(Ukraine) Yaroslav Popovych
2002	(Italy) Massimo Iannetti	(Italy) Giairo Ermeti	(Italy) Manuele Mori
2003	(Italy) Aristide Ratti	(Italy) Alessandro Proni	(Italy) Simone Guidi
2004	(Ukraine) Ruslan Pidgorniy	(Russia) Alexander Efimkin	(Italy) Marco Stefani
2005	(Belarus) Vasil Kiryienka	(Italy) Davide Bonucelli	(Italy) Alessio Ricciardi
2006	(Italy) Sacha Modolo	(Italy) Marco Bandiera	(Italy) Luca Fioretti
2007	(Italy) Francesco Ginanni	(Italy) Pierpaolo De Negri	(Poland) Adam Pierzga
2008	(Italy) Simone Ponzi (Italy) Pierpaolo De Negri		(Poland) Wojciech Dybel
2009	(Italy) Roberto Cesaro	(Italy) Leonardo Pinizzotto	(Italy) Giuseppe Di Salvo
2010	(Italy) Andrea Pasqualon	(Italy) Francesco Manuel Bongiorno	(Italy) Fabio Taddei
2011	(Russia) Alexander Serebryakov	(Italy) Alfonso Fiorenza	(Italy) Mirko Tedeschi
2012	(Italy) Gennaro Maddaluno	(Russia) Ilya Gorodnichev	(Italy) Alessandro Mazzi
2013	(Italy) Gianfranco Zilioli	(Italy) Alessio Taliani	(Italy) Valerio Conti
2014	(Italy) Paolo Totò	(Italy) Marco Chianese	(Italy) Marco D'Urbano
2015	(Italy) Danilo Celano	(Italy) Giuseppe Brovelli	(Italy) Paolo Bianchini
2016	(Belarus) Alexandr Riabushenko	(Italy) Andrea Vendrame	(Italy) Gian Marco Di Francesco
2017	(Italy) Eros Colombo	(Colombia) Einer Rubio	(Italy) Andrea Di Renzo
2018	(Italy) Michele Corradini	(Colombia) Einer Rubio	(Italy) Rossano Mauti
2019	(Italy) Manuel Pesci	(Italy) Lorenzo Quartucci	(Italy) Michele Corradini
2020	Cancelled		
2021	(Italy) Matteo Zurlo	(Italy) Filippo Magli	(Italy) Federico Iacomoni
2022	(Italy) Sergio Meris	(Italy) Jacopo Menegotto	(Italy) Alessandro Iacchi
2023	(Italy) Edoardo Zamperini	(Ukraine) Kyrylo Tsarenko	(Italy) Federico Iacomoni
