= 2014 Androni Giocattoli–Venezuela season =

Androni Giocattoli–Venezuela
- 2014 season
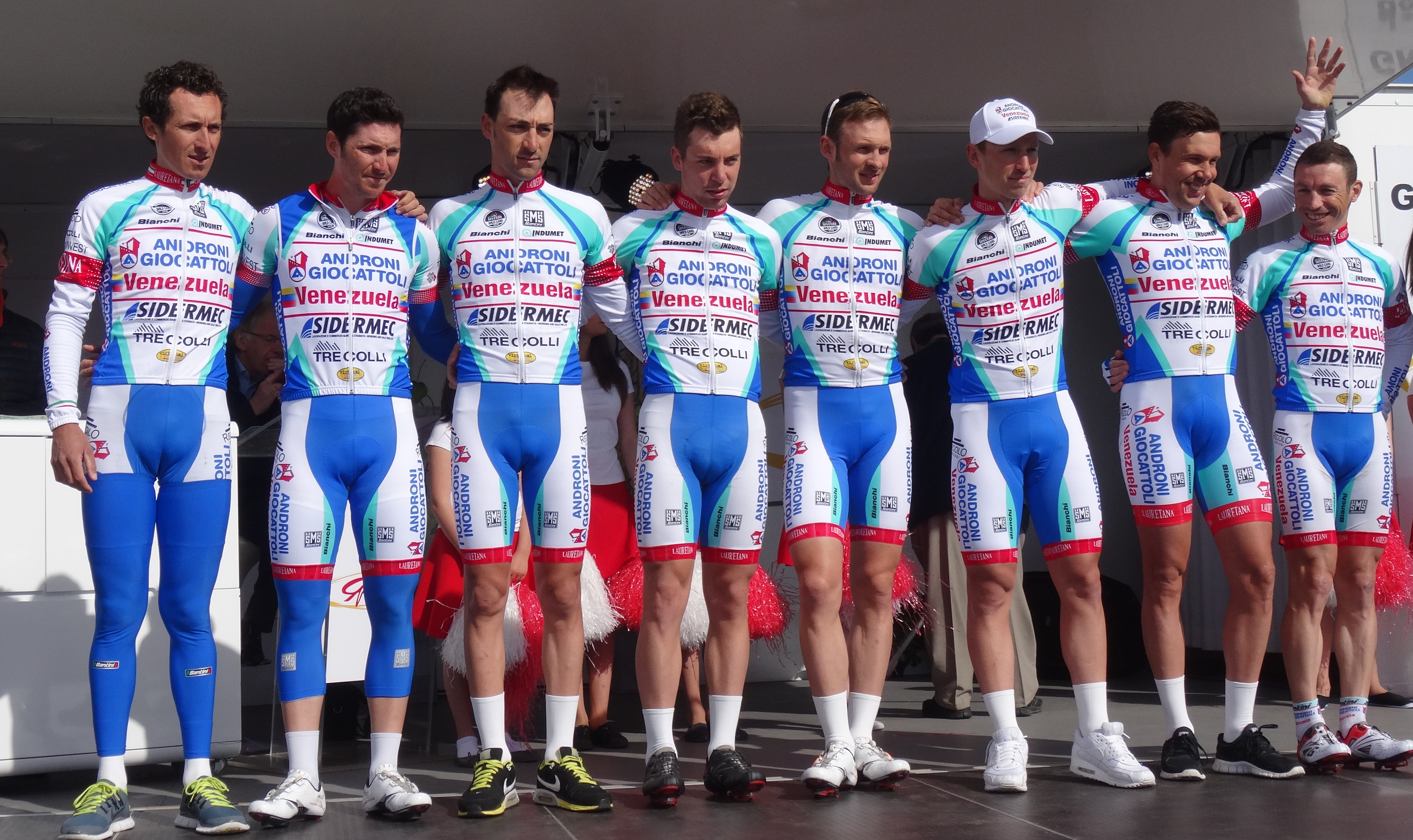
- The team at the 2014 Grand Prix de Denain
- UCI code: AND
- Status: UCI Professional Continental
- UCI Europe Tour ranking: 21 (585 points)
- Manager: Gianni Savio
- Based: Italy
- Bicycles: Bianchi
- Groupset: ?

Season victories
- One-day races: 0
- Stage race overall: 0
- Stage race stages: 5
- National Championships: 1
- Most wins: Kenny van Hummel (3 wins)

The 2014 season for Androni Giocattoli–Venezuela began in January at the Tour de San Luis. Androni Giocattoli–Venezuela is an Italian-registered UCI Professional Continental cycling team that participated in road bicycle racing events on the UCI Continental Circuits and when selected as a wildcard to UCI ProTour events.

== Team roster ==
As of 1 April 2014.

Rider	Date of birth
Marco Bandiera (ITA)	12 June 1984 (age 40)
Manuel Belletti (ITA)	14 October 1985 (age 39)
Omar Bertazzo (ITA)	7 January 1989 (age 36)
Matteo Di Serafino (ITA)	27 August 1986 (age 38)
Patrick Facchini (ITA)	28 January 1988 (age 37)
Marco Frapporti (ITA)	30 March 1985 (age 39)
Carlos Gálviz (VEN)	27 October 1989 (age 35)
Yonder Godoy (VEN)	19 April 1993 (age 31)
Johnny Hoogerland (NED)	13 May 1983 (age 41)
Carlos José Ochoa (VEN)	14 December 1980 (age 44)

Rider	Date of birth
Antonino Parrinello (ITA)	2 October 1988 (age 36)
Franco Pellizotti (ITA)	15 January 1978 (age 47)
Jackson Rodríguez (VEN)	25 February 1985 (age 40)
Diego Rosa (ITA)	27 March 1989 (age 35)
Emanuele Sella (ITA)	9 January 1981 (age 44)
Alessio Taliani (ITA)	11 October 1990 (age 34)
Nicola Testi (ITA)	29 April 1990 (age 34)
Kenny van Hummel (NED)	30 September 1982 (age 42)
Gianfranco Zilioli (ITA)	5 March 1990 (age 35)
Andrea Zordan (ITA)	11 July 1992 (age 32)

Riders who joined the team for the 2014 season

Rider	2013 team
Marco Bandiera	IAM Cycling
Manuel Belletti	Ag2r–La Mondiale
Carlos Gálviz	Trigon Cycling Team
Johnny Hoogerland	Vacansoleil–DCM
Alessio Taliani	neo-pro (Futura Matricardi)
Nicola Testi	neo-pro (Food Italia)
Kenny van Hummel	Vacansoleil–DCM
Gianfranco Zilioli	neo-pro (Team Colpack)
Andrea Zordan	neo-pro (Zalf-Désirée-Fior)

Riders who left the team during or after the 2013 season

Rider	2014 team
Riccardo Chiarini	
Giairo Ermeti	Retired
Fabio Felline	Trek Factory Racing
Mattia Gavazzi	Christina Watches–Dana
Alessandro Malaguti	Vini Fantini–Nippo
Francesco Reda	Suspended
Miguel Ángel Rubiano	Colombia

== Season victories ==
Date	Race	Competition	Rider	Country	Location
4 March	Tour de Langkawi, Stage 6	UCI Asia Tour	Kenny van Hummel (NED)	Malaysia	Pontian
7 May	Tour d'Azerbaïdjan, Stage 1	UCI Europe Tour	Kenny van Hummel (NED)	Azerbaijan	Sumqayit
1 June	Giro d'Italia, Intermediate sprints classification	UCI World Tour	Marco Bandiera (ITA)	Italy	
9 July	Vuelta a Venezuela, Stage 6	UCI America Tour	Carlos Gálviz (VEN)	Venezuela	Nirgua
13 July	Vuelta a Venezuela, Stage 10	UCI America Tour	Kenny van Hummel (NED)	Venezuela	Caracas
13 July	Vuelta a Venezuela, Young rider classification	UCI America Tour	Yonder Godoy (VEN)	Venezuela	
22 August	Tour du Limousin, Stage 4	UCI Europe Tour	Manuel Belletti (ITA)	France	Limoges
