= 2015 Sibiu Cycling Tour =

2015 UCI Europe Tour

Race details
- Dates: 1–5 July
- Stages: 5
- Distance: 683.6 km (424.8 mi)
- Winning time: 17h 14' 38"

Results
Jersey awarded to the overall winner	Winner	Mauro Finetto (ITA)	(Southeast Pro Cycling)
	Second	Davide Rebellin (ITA)	(CCC–Sprandi–Polkowice)
	Third	Serghei Țvetcov (ROM)	(Androni Giocattoli–Sidermec)
Jersey awarded to the points classification winner	Points	Mauro Finetto (ITA)	(Southeast Pro Cycling)
Jersey awarded to the mountains classification winner	Mountains	Mauro Finetto (ITA)	(Southeast Pro Cycling)
Jersey awarded to the young rider classification winner	Young rider	Giovanni Carboni (ITA)	(Unieuro–Wilier)
Jersey awarded to the sprints classification winner	Sprints	Robert Kessler (GER)	(LKT Team Brandenburg)
	Team	Southeast Pro Cycling	

The 2015 Sibiu Cycling Tour took place between 1 July and 5 July 2015. For the first time it was raced over 5 days, and moved forward in the calendar by nearly three weeks. The race was won by Mauro Finetto (Southeast Pro Cycling) who won the mountain stage to Păltiniș and was able to retain his jersey through to the end of the race.

== Teams ==
It was expected that the teams of all the jersey winners and stage winners from 2014, Adria Mobil, CCC–Sprandi–Polkowice, Verandas Willems and Parkhotel Valkenburg Continental Team, would compete again in 2015. Adria Mobil later withdrew to be replaced by Southeast Pro Cycling taking the number of pro-continental teams in the race to four.

UCI Professional Continental teams

- CCC–Sprandi–Polkowice
- Southeast Pro Cycling
- Nippo–Vini Fantini
- Androni Giocattoli–Sidermec

UCI Continental teams

- Itera–Katusha
- Bike Aid
- Team Stuttgart
- LKT Team Brandenburg
- Unieuro–Wilier
- Differdange–Losch
- Tuşnad Cycling Team
- Parkhotel Valkenburg Continental Team
- Kemo–Dukla Trenčín
- D'Amico–Bottecchia
- Team Ringeriks–Kraft
- GM Cycling Team

National team

- Romania

== Route ==
Stage information and winners
Stage	Date	Course	Distance	Type	Winner
P	1 July	Sibiu to Sibiu	2.3 km (1 mi)	Individual time trial	Rafael Andriato (BRA)
1	2 July	Sibiu to Mediaș to Sibiu	224.2 km (139 mi)	Intermediate stage	Oscar Gatto (ITA)
2	3 July	Sibiu to Sebeș to Păltiniș	151.1 km (94 mi)	Mountain stage	Mauro Finetto (ITA)
3	4 July	Sibiu to Bâlea Lake	161.9 km (101 mi)	Mountain stage	Alessio Taliani (ITA)
4	5 July	Sibiu to Poplaca to Slimnic to Sibiu	144.1 km (90 mi)	Flat stage	Oscar Gatto (ITA)

== Stages ==
=== Prologue ===
1 July 2015 — Sibiu to Sibiu, 2.3 km (1.4 mi), individual time trial (ITT)

Prologue result and general classification after Prologue
Rank	Rider	Team	Time
1	Rafael Andriato (BRA)	Southeast Pro Cycling	3' 21"
2	Eduard-Michael Grosu (ROU)	Nippo–Vini Fantini	+ 1"
3	Maroš Kováč (SVK)	Kemo–Dukla Trenčín	+ 1"
4	Patrik Tybor (SVK)	Kemo–Dukla Trenčín	+ 3"
5	Mauro Finetto (ITA)	Southeast Pro Cycling	+ 3"
6	Dion Beukeboom (NED)	Parkhotel Valkenburg Continental Team	+ 4"
7	Adrian Kurek (POL)	CCC–Sprandi–Polkowice	+ 4"
8	Iuri Filosi (ITA)	Southeast Pro Cycling	+ 5"
9	Davide Plebani (ITA)	Unieuro–Wilier	+ 5"
10	Andrei Nechita (ROU)	Tuşnad Cycling Team	+ 6"

=== Stage 1 ===
2 July 2015 — Sibiu to Sibiu, 224.2 km (139.3 mi)

Stage 1 result
Rank	Rider	Team	Time
1	Oscar Gatto (ITA)	Androni Giocattoli–Sidermec	5h 28' 23"
2	Filippo Fortin (ITA)	GM Cycling Team	+ 0"
3	Eduard-Michael Grosu (ROU)	Nippo–Vini Fantini	+ 0"
4	Simone Ponzi (ITA)	Southeast Pro Cycling	+ 0"
5	Christian Delle Stelle (ITA)	CCC–Sprandi–Polkowice	+ 0"
6	Rafael Andriato (BRA)	Southeast Pro Cycling	+ 0"
7	Julian Schulze (GER)	Team Stuttgart	+ 0"
8	Antonino Parrinello (ITA)	D'Amico–Bottecchia	+ 0"
9	Sergey Nikolaev (RUS)	Itera–Katusha	+ 0"
10	Maroš Kováč (SVK)	Kemo–Dukla Trenčín	+ 0"

General classification after stage 1
Rank	Rider	Team	Time
1	Eduard-Michael Grosu (ROU)	Nippo–Vini Fantini	5h 31' 41"
2	Rafael Andriato (BRA)	Southeast Pro Cycling	+ 3"
3	Maroš Kováč (SVK)	Kemo–Dukla Trenčín	+ 4"
4	Patrik Tybor (SVK)	Kemo–Dukla Trenčín	+ 6"
5	Mauro Finetto (ITA)	Southeast Pro Cycling	+ 6"
6	Giacomo Berlato (ITA)	Nippo–Vini Fantini	+ 10"
7	Elia Favilli (ITA)	Southeast Pro Cycling	+ 10"
8	Filippo Fortin (ITA)	GM Cycling Team	+ 10"
9	Simone Ponzi (ITA)	Southeast Pro Cycling	+ 11"
10	Janis Dakteris (LAT)	Differdange–Losch	+ 12"

=== Stage 2 ===
3 July 2015 — Sibiu to Păltiniș, 151.1 km (93.9 mi)

Stage 2 result
Rank	Rider	Team	Time
1	Mauro Finetto (ITA)	Southeast Pro Cycling	3h 55' 58"
2	Simone Ponzi (ITA)	Southeast Pro Cycling	+ 0"
3	Davide Rebellin (ITA)	CCC–Sprandi–Polkowice	+ 0"
4	Antonino Parrinello (ITA)	D'Amico–Bottecchia	+ 0"
5	Serghei Țvetcov (ROU)	Androni Giocattoli–Sidermec	+ 0"
6	Sergey Nikolaev (RUS)	Itera–Katusha	+ 0"
7	Paolo Ciavatta (ITA)	D'Amico–Bottecchia	+ 0"
8	Patrik Tybor (SVK)	Kemo–Dukla Trenčín	+ 4"
9	Alessandro Bisolti (ITA)	Nippo–Vini Fantini	+ 8"
10	Sergey Pomoshnikov (RUS)	Itera–Katusha	+ 9"

General classification after stage 2
Rank	Rider	Team	Time
1	Mauro Finetto (ITA)	Southeast Pro Cycling	9h 27' 35"
2	Simone Ponzi (ITA)	Southeast Pro Cycling	+ 9"
3	Davide Rebellin (ITA)	CCC–Sprandi–Polkowice	+ 12"
4	Patrik Tybor (SVK)	Kemo–Dukla Trenčín	+ 14"
5	Paolo Ciavatta (ITA)	D'Amico–Bottecchia	+ 17"
6	Serghei Țvetcov (ROU)	Androni Giocattoli–Sidermec	+ 23"
7	Sergey Nikolaev (RUS)	Itera–Katusha	+ 27"
8	Antonino Parrinello (ITA)	D'Amico–Bottecchia	+ 32"
9	Alessio Taliani (ITA)	Androni Giocattoli–Sidermec	+ 33"
10	Alessandro Bisolti (ITA)	Nippo–Vini Fantini	+ 36"

=== Stage 3 ===
4 July 2015 — Sibiu to Bâlea Lake, 161.9 km (100.6 mi)

Stage 3 result
Rank	Rider	Team	Time
1	Alessio Taliani (ITA)	Androni Giocattoli–Sidermec	4h 29' 58"
2	Antonino Parrinello (ITA)	D'Amico–Bottecchia	+ 4"
3	Serghei Țvetcov (ROU)	Androni Giocattoli–Sidermec	+ 4"
4	Davide Rebellin (ITA)	CCC–Sprandi–Polkowice	+ 4"
5	Mauro Finetto (ITA)	Southeast Pro Cycling	+ 4"
6	Nikolay Mihaylov (BUL)	CCC–Sprandi–Polkowice	+ 30"
7	Sergey Pomoshnikov (RUS)	Itera–Katusha	+ 30"
8	Paolo Ciavatta (ITA)	D'Amico–Bottecchia	+ 50"
9	Antonio Nibali (ITA)	Nippo–Vini Fantini	+ 1' 04"
10	Samuele Conti (ITA)	Southeast Pro Cycling	+ 1' 07"

General classification after stage 3
Rank	Rider	Team	Time
1	Mauro Finetto (ITA)	Southeast Pro Cycling	13h 57' 37"
2	Davide Rebellin (ITA)	CCC–Sprandi–Polkowice	+ 12"
3	Serghei Țvetcov (ROU)	Androni Giocattoli–Sidermec	+ 19"
4	Alessio Taliani (ITA)	Androni Giocattoli–Sidermec	+ 19"
5	Antonino Parrinello (ITA)	D'Amico–Bottecchia	+ 26"
6	Paolo Ciavatta (ITA)	D'Amico–Bottecchia	+ 1' 03"
7	Sergey Pomoshnikov (RUS)	Itera–Katusha	+ 1' 07"
8	Nikolay Mihaylov (BUL)	CCC–Sprandi–Polkowice	+ 1' 15"
9	Samuele Conti (ITA)	Southeast Pro Cycling	+ 1' 54"
10	Sergey Nikolaev (RUS)	Itera–Katusha	+ 2' 13"

=== Stage 4 ===
5 July 2015 — Sibiu to Sibiu, 144.1 km (89.5 mi)

Stage 4 result
Rank	Rider	Team	Time
1	Oscar Gatto (ITA)	Androni Giocattoli–Sidermec	3h 16' 59"
2	Eduard-Michael Grosu (ROU)	Nippo–Vini Fantini	+ 0"
3	Christian Delle Stelle (ITA)	CCC–Sprandi–Polkowice	+ 2"
4	Filippo Fortin (ITA)	GM Cycling Team	+ 2"
5	Simone Ponzi (ITA)	Southeast Pro Cycling	+ 2"
6	Fabio Chinello (ITA)	Unieuro–Wilier	+ 2"
7	Pierpaolo De Negri (ITA)	Nippo–Vini Fantini	+ 2"
8	Mauro Finetto (ITA)	Southeast Pro Cycling	+ 2"
9	Rino Gasparrini (ITA)	Unieuro–Wilier	+ 2"
10	Maroš Kováč (SVK)	Kemo–Dukla Trenčín	+ 2"

Final general classification
Rank	Rider	Team	Time
1	Mauro Finetto (ITA)	Southeast Pro Cycling	17h 14' 38"
2	Davide Rebellin (ITA)	CCC–Sprandi–Polkowice	+ 12"
3	Serghei Țvetcov (ROU)	Androni Giocattoli–Sidermec	+ 19"
4	Antonino Parrinello (ITA)	D'Amico–Bottecchia	+ 26"
5	Alessio Taliani (ITA)	Androni Giocattoli–Sidermec	+ 33"
6	Paolo Ciavatta (ITA)	D'Amico–Bottecchia	+ 1' 09"
7	Nikolay Mihaylov (BUL)	CCC–Sprandi–Polkowice	+ 1' 21"
8	Sergey Pomoshnikov (RUS)	Itera–Katusha	+ 1' 23"
9	Samuele Conti (ITA)	Southeast Pro Cycling	+ 2' 03"
10	Sergey Nikolaev (RUS)	Itera–Katusha	+ 2' 19"
