= 2012 Tour of Belgium =

2012 UCI Europe Tour
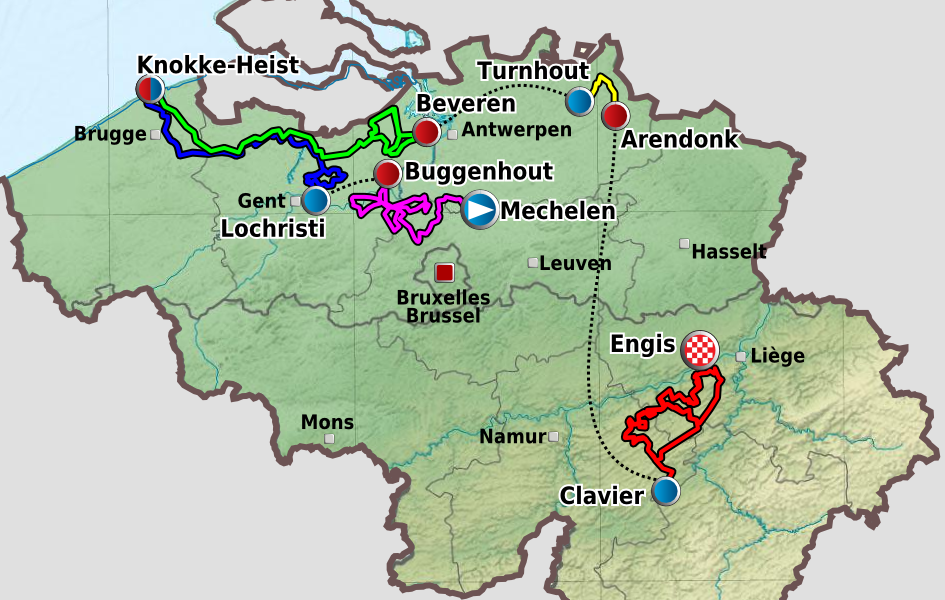

Race details
- Dates: 23—27 May
- Stages: 5
- Distance: 727 km (451.7 mi)

The 2012 Tour of Belgium was the 82nd edition of the Tour of Belgium cycling stage race. It took place from 23 May to 27 May 2012 in Belgium. The race is part of the UCI Europe Tour. It began with three relatively short stages, followed by two stages meant to be deciding the tour: an individual time-trial on Saturday and a longer stage through the hills of the Ardennes.

Different comparing to the previous years was that the leader in the race will wore a red jersey (instead of black), whereas the black jersey went to the most combative rider. To decide the combativity, there were three sprints in each stage (except for the time-trial), where in case of a breakaway, the first five riders earned points (10, 8, 6, 4 and 2). Based on the lead the breakaway has on the peloton, these riders received bonus points, going from 1 point for a 30-second lead up to 5 points for a lead of 4 minutes or more. Another change, as introduced during the 2011 Tour de France, was the so-called "supersprint": each stage had one supersprint, where riders earned points that counted for the yellow sprint jersey and bonification seconds for the general classification.

== Schedule ==
| Stage | Route | Distance | Date | Winner |
|---|---|---|---|---|
| 1 | Mechelen to Buggenhout | 162 km | Wednesday, May 23 | André Greipel (GER) |
| 2 | Lochristi to Knokke-Heist | 169.5 km | Thursday, May 24 | André Greipel (GER) |
| 3 | Knokke-Heist to Beveren | 163 km | Friday, May 25 | André Greipel (GER) |
| 4 | Turnhout to Arendonk | 20.5 km | Saturday, May 26 | Tony Martin (GER) |
| 5 | Clavier to Engis | 212 km | Sunday, May 27 | Carlos Betancur (COL) |

== Teams ==
Twenty-one teams have been invited to the 2011 Tour of Belgium: 7 teams are from the UCI ProTeams, 7 are UCI Professional Continental Teams and 7 are UCI Continental Teams.

UCI ProTeams
- (Kazakhstan) Astana
- (United States) BMC Racing Team
- (Belgium) Lotto–Belisol
- (Belgium) Omega Pharma–Quick-Step
- (Netherlands) Rabobank
- (Russia) Team Katusha
- (Netherlands) Vacansoleil–DCM
UCI Professional Continental Teams
- (Belgium) Accent.jobs–Willems Veranda's
- (Italy) Acqua & Sapone
- (Netherlands) Argos–Shimano
- (France) Cofidis
- (Belgium) Landbouwkrediet–Euphony
- (Russia) RusVelo
- (Belgium) Topsport Vlaanderen–Mercator
- (United States) UnitedHealthcare
UCI Continental Teams
- (Belgium) An Post–Sean Kelly
- (Belgium) BKCP–Powerplus
- (Belgium) Telenet–Fidea
- (Belgium) Sunweb–Revor
- (Belgium) Wallonie Bruxelles–Crédit Agricole
- Belgium (Note: Following a new regulation by the UCI, a sponsor name can not appear on the shirt of more than one team during a race. As such, although being invited, Jong Vlaanderen could not participate as a team due to the presence of Topsport Vlaanderen–Mercator. Therefore, the race directors allowed Jong Vlaanderen to participate as a Belgian selection, where they selected 7 riders and were joined by Moreno De Pauw of the Rock Werchter Cycling Team.)

== Stages ==
=== Stage 1 ===
23 May 2012 – Mechelen to Buggenhout, 162 km (101 mi)

Early throughout the race, a breakaway of eight riders formed, consisting of Paolo Ciavatta, Leonardo Duque, Simon Geschke, Arnaud Jouffroy, Egidijus Juodvalkis, Philippe Legrand, Michael Schär and Jelle Wallays. With only 17 kilometres to go, Ciavatta, Schär and Wallays sprinted away from the group. They were however not able to stay out of the grasp of the peloton, where mainly Omega Pharma–Quick-Step and Lotto–Belisol had been chasing hard.

The peloton sprinted for the stage win in Buggenhout, where a photo finish was necessary to decide the winner as three riders crossed the line nearly simultaneously. Although Danilo Napolitano ostensively gestured and seemed sure of the victory, the photo finish clearly showed André Greipel to cross the line first, with Napolitano in second and Kenny van Hummel in third. Due to the bonification seconds, Greipel became the first overall leader. He also took the first yellow jersey as leader in the sprint classification, while Leonardo Duque took the black jersey as most combative.

Stage 1 result

| | Rider | Team | Time |
|---|---|---|---|
| 1 | André Greipel (GER) | Lotto–Belisol | 3h 33' 11" |
| 2 | Danilo Napolitano (ITA) | Acqua & Sapone | s.t. |
| 3 | Kenny van Hummel (NED) | Vacansoleil–DCM | s.t. |
| 4 | Jacopo Guarnieri (ITA) | Astana | s.t. |
| 5 | Adam Blythe (GBR) | BMC Racing Team | s.t. |
| 6 | Michael Van Staeyen (BEL) | Topsport Vlaanderen–Mercator | s.t. |
| 7 | Stefan van Dijk (NED) | Accent.jobs–Willems Veranda's | s.t. |
| 8 | Baptiste Planckaert (BEL) | Landbouwkrediet–Euphony | s.t. |
| 9 | Robin Stenuit (BEL) | Wallonie Bruxelles–Crédit Agricole | s.t. |
| 10 | Tom Meeusen (BEL) | Telenet–Fidea | s.t. |

General Classification after Stage 1

| | Rider | Team | Time |
|---|---|---|---|
| 1 | André Greipel (GER) | Lotto–Belisol | 3h 33' 01" |
| 2 | Danilo Napolitano (ITA) | Acqua & Sapone | + 4" |
| 3 | Kenny van Hummel (NED) | Vacansoleil–DCM | + 6" |
| 4 | Egidijus Juodvalkis (LTU) | Landbouwkrediet–Euphony | + 7" |
| 5 | Simon Geschke (GER) | Argos–Shimano | + 8" |
| 6 | Leonardo Duque (COL) | Cofidis | + 9" |
| 7 | Jacopo Guarnieri (ITA) | Astana | + 10" |
| 8 | Adam Blythe (GBR) | BMC Racing Team | + 10" |
| 9 | Michael Van Staeyen (BEL) | Topsport Vlaanderen–Mercator | + 10" |
| 10 | Stefan van Dijk (NED) | Accent.jobs–Willems Veranda's | + 10" |

=== Stage 2 ===
24 May 2012 – Lochristi to Knokke-Heist, 169.5 km (105.3 mi)

With still 145 kilometres to go, a group of five pelotonriders broke away from the peloton, achieving a lead of up to five minutes over the main bunch. The five riders were Pim Ligthart, Mark McNally, Aleksejs Saramotins, Ramon Sinkeldam and Jay Thomson. Again Omega Pharma–Quick-Step and Lotto–Belisol were chasing the group, but were unable to bring te gap down below three minutes with 20 kilometres to go. It was only when BMC Racing Team stepped up to help, the gap reduced further.

In the lead group, Sinkeldam sped away from the others and while the others were caught, he managed to stay out of the grasp of the peloton up to two kilometres of the finish line. For the second day in a row, the peloton sprinted for the stage win, with André Greipel and Danilo Napolitano again finishing first and second. Jacopo Guarnieri was the third man on the podium and due to the bonification seconds he became the new leader in the youth classification. Because of his win, Greipel strengthened his lead in both the general classification and the sprint classification. Leonardo Duque was still leading the combativity classification.

Stage 2 result

| | Rider | Team | Time |
|---|---|---|---|
| 1 | André Greipel (GER) | Lotto–Belisol | 3h 46' 13" |
| 2 | Danilo Napolitano (ITA) | Acqua & Sapone | s.t. |
| 3 | Jacopo Guarnieri (ITA) | Astana | s.t. |
| 4 | Adrien Petit (FRA) | Cofidis | s.t. |
| 5 | Kenny van Hummel (NED) | Vacansoleil–DCM | s.t. |
| 6 | Michael Van Staeyen (BEL) | Topsport Vlaanderen–Mercator | s.t. |
| 7 | Timothy Dupont (BEL) | Belgium | s.t. |
| 8 | Bert De Backer (BEL) | Argos–Shimano | s.t. |
| 9 | Alexei Tsatevich (RUS) | Team Katusha | s.t. |
| 10 | Sven Vanthourenhout (BEL) | Landbouwkrediet–Euphony | s.t. |

General Classification after Stage 2

| | Rider | Team | Time |
|---|---|---|---|
| 1 | André Greipel (GER) | Lotto–Belisol | 7h 19' 04" |
| 2 | Danilo Napolitano (ITA) | Acqua & Sapone | + 8" |
| 3 | Jacopo Guarnieri (ITA) | Astana | + 16" |
| 4 | Kenny van Hummel (NED) | Vacansoleil–DCM | + 16" |
| 5 | Pim Ligthart (NED) | Vacansoleil–DCM | + 17" |
| 6 | Egidijus Juodvalkis (LTU) | Landbouwkrediet–Euphony | + 17" |
| 7 | Simon Geschke (GER) | Argos–Shimano | + 18" |
| 8 | Mark McNally (GBR) | An Post–Sean Kelly | + 18" |
| 9 | Leonardo Duque (COL) | Cofidis | + 19" |
| 10 | Ramon Sinkeldam (NED) | Argos–Shimano | + 19" |

=== Stage 3 ===
25 May 2012 – Knokke-Heist to Beveren, 163 km (101 mi)

Maxim Belkov, Tijmen Eising, Alessandro Donati, Pieter Vanspeybrouck en Coen Vermeltfoort were the attackers of the day. Belkov held out the longest, being caught only 8 kilometres from the finish line, before the third peloton sprint in three days was a fact. André Greipel and Danilo Napolitano again took the top two places. The jerseys did not change hands, except for the white jersey, which went to Adam Blythe.

Stage 3 result

| | Rider | Team | Time |
|---|---|---|---|
| 1 | André Greipel (GER) | Lotto–Belisol | 4h 03' 34" |
| 2 | Danilo Napolitano (ITA) | Acqua & Sapone | s.t. |
| 3 | Adam Blythe (GBR) | BMC Racing Team | s.t. |
| 4 | Kenny van Hummel (NED) | Vacansoleil–DCM | s.t. |
| 5 | Andrew Fenn (GBR) | Omega Pharma–Quick-Step | s.t. |
| 6 | Tom Van Asbroeck (BEL) | Topsport Vlaanderen–Mercator | s.t. |
| 7 | Bert De Backer (BEL) | Argos–Shimano | s.t. |
| 8 | Lars Boom (NED) | Rabobank | s.t. |
| 9 | Alexei Tsatevich (RUS) | Team Katusha | s.t. |
| 10 | Borut Božič (SLO) | Astana | s.t. |

General Classification after Stage 3

| | Rider | Team | Time |
|---|---|---|---|
| 1 | André Greipel (GER) | Lotto–Belisol | 11h 22' 28" |
| 2 | Danilo Napolitano (ITA) | Acqua & Sapone | + 12" |
| 3 | Kenny van Hummel (NED) | Vacansoleil–DCM | + 26" |
| 4 | Adam Blythe (GBR) | BMC Racing Team | + 26" |
| 5 | Jacopo Guarnieri (ITA) | Astana | + 26" |
| 6 | Pim Ligthart (NED) | Vacansoleil–DCM | + 27" |
| 7 | Egidijus Juodvalkis (LTU) | Landbouwkrediet–Euphony | + 27" |
| 8 | Maxim Belkov (RUS) | Team Katusha | + 27" |
| 9 | Lars Boom (NED) | Rabobank | + 28" |
| 10 | Mark McNally (GBR) | An Post–Sean Kelly | + 28" |

=== Stage 4 ===
26 May 2012 – Turnhout to Arendonk, 20.5 km (12.7 mi)

Stage 4 result

| | Rider | Team | Time |
|---|---|---|---|
| 1 | Tony Martin (GER) | Omega Pharma–Quick-Step | 24' 04" |
| 2 | Lieuwe Westra (NED) | Vacansoleil–DCM | + 46" |
| 3 | Niki Terpstra (NED) | Omega Pharma–Quick-Step | + 52" |
| 4 | Carlos Barredo (ESP) | Rabobank | + 1' 00" |
| 5 | Alexander Serov (RUS) | RusVelo | + 1' 05" |
| 6 | Lars Boom (NED) | Rabobank | + 1' 11" |
| 7 | Andriy Hryvko (UKR) | Astana | + 1' 15" |
| 8 | Tobias Ludvigsson (SWE) | Argos–Shimano | + 1' 19" |
| 9 | Sergey Firsanov (RUS) | RusVelo | + 1' 21" |
| 10 | Guillaume Van Keirsbulck (BEL) | Omega Pharma–Quick-Step | + 1' 23" |

General Classification after Stage 4

| | Rider | Team | Time |
|---|---|---|---|
| 1 | Tony Martin (GER) | Omega Pharma–Quick-Step | 11h 47' 02" |
| 2 | Lieuwe Westra (NED) | Vacansoleil–DCM | + 46" |
| 3 | Niki Terpstra (NED) | Omega Pharma–Quick-Step | + 52" |
| 4 | Carlos Barredo (ESP) | Rabobank | + 1' 00" |
| 5 | Alexander Serov (RUS) | RusVelo | + 1' 05" |
| 6 | Lars Boom (NED) | Rabobank | + 1' 09" |
| 7 | Andriy Hryvko (UKR) | Astana | + 1' 15" |
| 8 | Tobias Ludvigsson (SWE) | Argos–Shimano | + 1' 19" |
| 9 | Sergey Firsanov (RUS) | RusVelo | + 1' 21" |
| 10 | Guillaume Van Keirsbulck (BEL) | Omega Pharma–Quick-Step | + 1' 23" |

=== Stage 5 ===
27 May 2012 – Clavier to Engis, 212 km (132 mi)

Stage 5 result

| | Rider | Team | Time |
|---|---|---|---|
| 1 | Carlos Betancur (COL) | Acqua & Sapone | 5h 04' 18" |
| 2 | Kevin Pauwels (BEL) | Sunweb–Revor | + 2" |
| 3 | Sergey Firsanov (RUS) | RusVelo | + 2" |
| 4 | Philippe Gilbert (BEL) | BMC Racing Team | + 5" |
| 5 | Lieuwe Westra (NED) | Vacansoleil–DCM | + 5" |
| 6 | Bert De Waele (BEL) | Landbouwkrediet–Euphony | + 8" |
| 7 | Tony Martin (GER) | Omega Pharma–Quick-Step | + 8" |
| 8 | Dmitry Kozonchuk (RUS) | RusVelo | + 8" |
| 9 | Alexandr Kolobnev (RUS) | Team Katusha | + 11" |
| 10 | Carlos Barredo (ESP) | Rabobank | + 13" |

Final General Classification

| | Rider | Team | Time |
|---|---|---|---|
| 1 | Tony Martin (GER) | Omega Pharma–Quick-Step | 16h 51' 28" |
| 2 | Lieuwe Westra (NED) | Vacansoleil–DCM | + 43" |
| 3 | Carlos Barredo (ESP) | Rabobank | + 1' 02" |
| 4 | Sergey Firsanov (RUS) | RusVelo | + 1' 11" |
| 5 | Andriy Hryvko (UKR) | Astana | + 1' 26" |
| 6 | Francesco Reda (ITA) | Acqua & Sapone | + 1' 38" |
| 7 | Philippe Gilbert (BEL) | BMC Racing Team | + 1' 45" |
| 8 | Simon Špilak (SLO) | Team Katusha | + 1' 47" |
| 9 | Manuel Quinziato (ITA) | BMC Racing Team | + 1' 50" |
| 10 | Maarten Wynants (BEL) | Rabobank | + 1' 58" |

== Classification leadership table ==
| Stage | Winner | General classification Algemeen klassement | Points classification Puntenklassement | Combativity Classification Prijs van de strijdlust | Young Rider classification Jongerenklassement | Team classification Ploegenklassement |
|---|---|---|---|---|---|---|
| 1 | André Greipel | André Greipel | André Greipel | Leonardo Duque | Egidijus Juodvalkis | Landbouwkrediet–Euphony |
| 2 | André Greipel | André Greipel | André Greipel | Leonardo Duque | Jacopo Guarnieri | Landbouwkrediet–Euphony |
| 3 | André Greipel | André Greipel | André Greipel | Leonardo Duque | Adam Blythe | Landbouwkrediet–Euphony |
| 4 | Tony Martin | Tony Martin | André Greipel | Leonardo Duque | Tobias Ludvigsson | Omega Pharma–Quick-Step |
| 5 | Carlos Betancur | Tony Martin | André Greipel | Leonardo Duque | Pieter Serry | RusVelo |
| Final | | Tony Martin | André Greipel | Leonardo Duque | Pieter Serry | RusVelo |

== Final standings ==
=== General classification ===
| | Rider | Team | Time |
|---|---|---|---|
| 1 | Tony Martin (GER) | Omega Pharma–Quick-Step | 16h 51' 28" |
| 2 | Lieuwe Westra (NED) | Vacansoleil–DCM | + 43" |
| 3 | Carlos Barredo (ESP) | Rabobank | + 1' 02" |
| 4 | Sergey Firsanov (RUS) | RusVelo | + 1' 11" |
| 5 | Andriy Hryvko (UKR) | Astana | + 1' 26" |
| 6 | Francesco Reda (ITA) | Acqua & Sapone | + 1' 38" |
| 7 | Philippe Gilbert (BEL) | BMC Racing Team | + 1' 45" |
| 8 | Simon Špilak (SLO) | Team Katusha | + 1' 47" |
| 9 | Manuel Quinziato (ITA) | BMC Racing Team | + 1' 50" |
| 10 | Maarten Wynants (BEL) | Rabobank | + 1' 58" |

=== Points classification ===
| | Rider | Team | Points |
|---|---|---|---|
| 1 | André Greipel (GER) | Lotto–Belisol | 90 |
| 2 | Danilo Napolitano (ITA) | Acqua & Sapone | 75 |
| 3 | Kenny van Hummel (NED) | Vacansoleil–DCM | 58 |
| 4 | Carlos Barredo (ESP) | Rabobank | 53 |
| 5 | Tony Martin (GER) | Omega Pharma–Quick-Step | 43 |
| 6 | Lieuwe Westra (NED) | Vacansoleil–DCM | 42 |
| 7 | Lars Boom (NED) | Rabobank | 42 |
| 8 | Adam Blythe (GBR) | BMC Racing Team | 39 |
| 9 | Sergey Firsanov (RUS) | RusVelo | 33 |
| 10 | Carlos Betancur (COL) | Acqua & Sapone | 30 |

=== Combativity classification ===
| | Rider | Team | Points |
|---|---|---|---|
| 1 | Leonardo Duque (COL) | Cofidis | 87 |
| 2 | Michael Schär (SUI) | BMC Racing Team | 43 |
| 3 | Ramon Sinkeldam (NED) | Argos–Shimano | 35 |
| 4 | Alessandro Donati (ITA) | Acqua & Sapone | 26 |
| 5 | Pim Ligthart (NED) | Vacansoleil–DCM | 21 |
| 6 | Jay Thomson (RSA) | UnitedHealthcare | 19 |
| 7 | Aleksejs Saramotins (LAT) | Cofidis | 19 |
| 8 | Coen Vermeltfoort (NED) | Rabobank | 18 |
| 9 | Maxim Belkov (RUS) | Team Katusha | 16 |
| 10 | Paolo Ciavatta (ITA) | Acqua & Sapone | 14 |

=== Young rider classification ===
| | Rider | Team | Time |
|---|---|---|---|
| 1 | Pieter Serry (BEL) | Topsport Vlaanderen–Mercator | 16h 54' 08" |
| 2 | Romain Zingle (BEL) | Cofidis | + 26" |
| 3 | Petr Ignatenko (RUS) | Team Katusha | + 40" |
| 4 | Tobias Ludvigsson (SWE) | Argos–Shimano | + 1' 00" |
| 5 | Egidijus Juodvalkis (LTU) | Landbouwkrediet–Euphony | + 1' 01" |
| 6 | Carlos Betancur (COL) | Acqua & Sapone | + 1' 39" |
| 7 | Laurens De Vreese (BEL) | Topsport Vlaanderen–Mercator | + 3' 33" |
| 8 | Pim Ligthart (NED) | Vacansoleil–DCM | + 10' 15" |
| 9 | Lubomir Petrus (CZE) | BKCP–Powerplus | + 11' 12" |
| 10 | Matteo Trentin (ITA) | Omega Pharma–Quick-Step | + 11' 25" |

=== Team classification ===
| | Team | Points |
|---|---|---|
| 1 | (Russia) RusVelo | 50h 39' 05" |
| 2 | (Russia) Team Katusha | + 1' 06" |
| 3 | (United States) BMC Racing Team | + 2' 17" |
| 4 | (Netherlands) Vacansoleil–DCM | + 3' 45" |
| 5 | (Belgium) Landbouwkrediet–Euphony | + 4' 35" |
| 6 | (Kazakhstan) Astana | + 9' 47" |
| 7 | (Netherlands) Rabobank | + 11' 27" |
| 8 | (Italy) Acqua & Sapone | + 12' 23" |
| 9 | (Belgium) Topsport Vlaanderen–Mercator | + 12' 54" |
| 10 | (France) Cofidis | + 15' 37" |
