= Ilia Koshevoy =

Belarusian cyclist

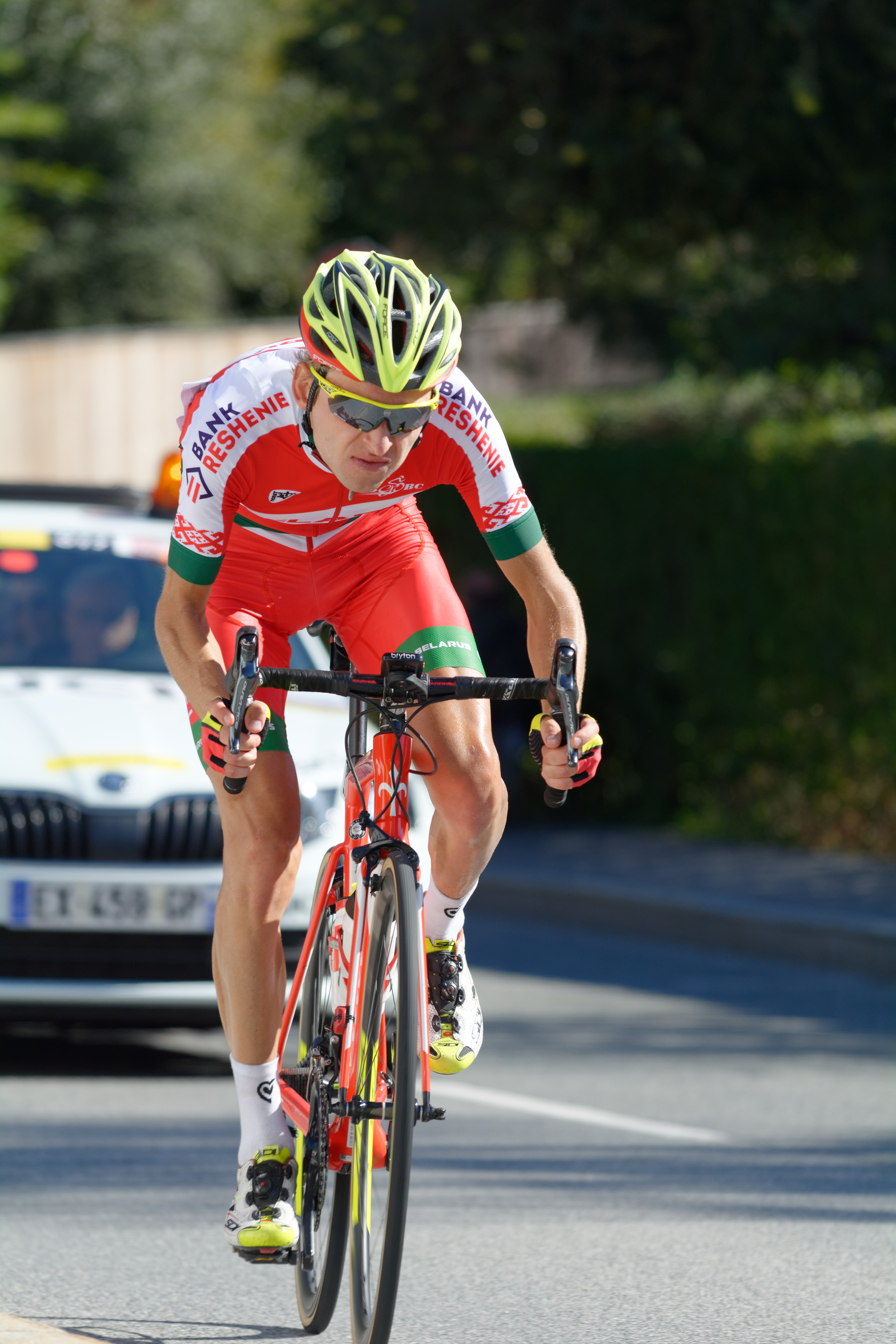
- Ilia Koshevoy in 2018 in the breakaway at World Championship

Personal information
- Full name: Ilia Evgenievich Koshevoy
- Born: 20 March 1991 (age 35) Minsk, Byelorussian SSR, Soviet Union
- Height: 181 cm (5 ft 11 1/2 in)
- Weight: 62.5 kg (138 lb)

Cycling career
- Sport: Cycling
- Current team: Retired
- Disciplines: Road; Track
- Role: Rider

Amateur teams
- 2011: Brogio
- 2012–2013: Big Hunter–Effepi Auto–Fil 3–Seanese
- 2014: GS Podenzano

Professional teams
- 2013: Androni Giocattoli–Venezuela (stagiaire)
- 2014: Lampre–Merida (stagiaire)
- 2015–2016: Lampre–Merida
- 2017–2018: Wilier Triestina–Selle Italia

Ilia Evgenievich Koshevoy (Belarusian: Ілья Яўгенавіч Кашавы; born 20 March 1991) is a Belarusian former professional cyclist, who rode professionally between 2015 and 2018 for the Lampre–Merida and Wilier Triestina–Selle Italia teams.

== Biography ==
=== 2009 season ===
In August 2009 Koshevoy finished 40th overall in the junior Regio-Tour. In September he finished second on stages one and two at the Giro di Basilicata stage race, finishing second overall with the same time as winner Giovanni Gaia.

=== 2011 season ===
In May 2011 Koshevoy finished 40th in the Gran Premio Industrie del Marmo and 41st at the Trofeo Città di San Vendemiano in Italy. He then participated in the Belarus national championships, finishing second in the individual time trial behind Kanstantsin Sivtsov of HTC–Highroad and 11th in the road race. In July he travelled to Offida, Italy to participate in the European Road Championships, where he finished 33rd in the time trial and 53rd in the road race.

=== 2012 season ===
Koshevoy began his season in April at the Trofeo Banca Popolare di Vicenza where he finished 27th, before finishing 14th in the Gran Premio Palio del Recioto nine days later. He then abandoned the Toscana-Terra di Ciclismo and came 34th in the Gran Premio della Liberazione. At the national road cycling championships in Grodno, Koshevoy finished eighth in the road race.

Koshevoy finished 34th overall in the Dookoła Mazowsza stage race in Poland in July, as well as finishing 8th in the young rider classification. In August at the European Road Championships in Goes, the Netherlands he finished 49th in the individual time trial and 78th in the road race. Koshevoy then went to Italy where he finished 20th in the GP Capodarco before returning to the Netherlands to represent Belarus at the UCI Road World Championships in Valkenburg. He finished 28th in the men's under-23 road race. Koshevoy ended his season in Italy in September with a 67th position in the Ruota d'Oro.

=== 2013 season ===
Koshevoy began the 2013 season in April at the Trofeo Edil C, finishing in 10th place. Twelve days later he won the Gran Premio della Liberazione by finishing one second ahead of Adam Phelan of Drapac Cycling. This was his only win in the UCI Europe Tour. Three days after this victory he came 14th in the Gran Premio Industrie del Marmo. In May Koshevoy travelled to Azerbaijan to compete in the Tour d'Azerbaïdjan. He finished 23rd overall and 20th in the mountains classification. In June Koshevoy came 47th in the Trofeo Alcide Degasperi, and eighth in the Belarusian National Road Race Championships. In July he finished 38th in the under-23 road race at the European Road Championships.

In August he joined the Italian UCI Professional Continental team Androni Giocattoli–Venezuela as a stagiaire for the remainder of their season. He finished 14th in the GP Capodarco, 58 seconds behind winner Matteo Busato. He then raced the Tour du Limousin, finishing 56th overall and 11th in the young rider classification. Representing Belarus at the UCI Road World Championships in Tuscany, Koshevoy finished 20th in the men's under-23 road race, 16 seconds behind winner Matej Mohorič. Koshevoy ended the season in October with a 43rd place in the Coppa Sabatini and a 20th place at the Gran Premio Bruno Beghelli. He was not offered a contract with Androni Giocattoli–Venezuela for the 2014 season.

=== 2014 season ===
Koshevoy began the 2014 season in April with a 27th place at the Trofeo Edil C and a 28th place at the Gran Premio Industrie del Marmo. In June he finished second in the Trofeo Alcide Degasperi and 21st in the Coppa della Pace. On 29 June Koshevoy participated in the Belarusian National Road Race Championships in Mazyr. He finished in eighth place, 15 seconds behind winner Yauheni Hutarovich of Ag2r–La Mondiale.

In July Koshevoy signed as a stagiaire for the remainder of the 2014 Lampre–Merida season, beginning August 1. His first race for Lampre–Merida was in the United States, where he finished 13th in the Tour of Utah. After returning to Europe Koshevoy raced the GP Capodarco, which he did not finish. He ended his season in September at the Tre Valli Varesine, which he did not finish either. Despite this Koshevoy was offered a professional contract for the following season.

=== 2015 season ===
2015 was Koshevoy's first proper season as a professional cyclist at Italian UCI ProTeam Lampre–Merida. He started off the season at the Dubai Tour, finishing 24th overall and second in the young rider classification. Koshevoy finished 68th at the Trofeo Laigueglia in Italy. In March Koshevoy finished 48th at the Gran Premio di Lugano. In Strade Bianche Koshevoy was part of an early breakaway which was caught by the peloton, and he did not finish the race. He was named in the start list for the Vuelta a España. He finished in second on the Vuelta's seventh stage behind Bert-Jan Lindeman and he finished in 144th position in the general classification.

=== 2016 season ===
He was named in the start list for the Giro d'Italia, which he finished in 97th position. He also participated in the Vuelta a España, finishing it in the 151st position.

=== 2017 season ===
For 2017 Koshevoy signed for the Italian UCI Professional Continental team Wilier Triestina–Selle Italia and rode the Giro d'Italia.

== Major results ==
2009
2nd Overall Giro di Basilicata
2nd Stage 2 Giro della Lunigiana
2011
2nd Time trial, National Road Championships
2013
1st Gran Premio della Liberazione
10th Trofeo Edil C
2014
2nd Trofeo Alcide Degasperi
2015
1st Stage 7 Tour of Qinghai Lake
2nd Stage 7 2015 Vuelta a España
10th Overall Tour of Japan

1st Young rider classification

2016
5th Overall Tour de San Luis
2017
4th Overall Tour of Qinghai Lake
2018
4th Overall La Tropicale Amissa Bongo
7th Overall Tour of Antalya

=== Grand Tour general classification results timeline ===
Grand Tour	2015	2016	2017
Giro d'Italia	—	97	155
Tour de France	—	—	—
Vuelta a España	144	151	—

Legend
—	Did not compete
DNF	Did not finish
