= 2015 Tre Valli Varesine =

Tre Valli Varesine
2015 UCI Europe Tour

Race details
- Dates: September 30
- Stages: 1
- Distance: 198 km (123.0 mi)
- Winning time: 4 hr 44' 09"

Results
	Winner	Vincenzo Nibali (ITA)	(Astana)
	Second	Sergey Firsanov (RUS)	(RusVelo)
	Third	Giacomo Nizzolo (ITA)	(Trek Factory Racing)

The 2015 Tre Valli Varesine was the 95th edition of the Tre Valli Varesine single-day cycling race. As was the 2014 edition, it was raced in September; however, unlike the previous edition, it was held after the World Championships. It was the final part of the Trittico Lombardo. The race started in Busto Arsizio and concluded in Varese, after 198 kilometres (123 mi). The race consisted of the first 83 km from Busto Arsizio to Varese passing through several municipality of the Provincia di Varese, and then a final circuit in Varese that was repeated nine times The race was won by Vincenzo Nibali (Astana), who attacked on the final climb and finished eight seconds ahead of the lead group. Sergey Firsanov (RusVelo) was second, with Giacomo Nizzolo (Trek Factory Racing) third.

== Teams ==
The provisional start list include 19 teams:

UCI WorldTeams
- Astana
- Lampre–Merida
- FDJ
- Trek Factory Racing
UCI Professional Continental Teams
- Southeast Pro Cycling
- Androni Giocattoli–Sidermec
- Bardiani–CSF
- Colombia
- Nippo–Vini Fantini
- CCC–Sprandi–Polkowice
- MTN–Qhubeka
- Bora–Argon 18
- RusVelo
- UnitedHealthcare
UCI Continental Teams
- Team Idea 2010 ASD
- MG.Kvis-Vega
- D'Amico–Bottecchia
- Unieuro–Wilier
- GM Cycling Team

== Results ==
Result
Rank	Rider	Team	Time
1	Vincenzo Nibali (ITA)	Astana	4hr 44' 09"
2	Sergey Firsanov (RUS)	RusVelo	+ 8"
3	Giacomo Nizzolo (ITA)	Trek Factory Racing	+ 8"
4	Simone Ponzi (ITA)	Southeast Pro Cycling	+ 8"
5	Fabio Felline (ITA)	Trek Factory Racing	+ 8"
6	Kristian Sbaragli (ITA)	MTN–Qhubeka	+ 8"
7	Kenny Elissonde (FRA)	FDJ	+ 8"
8	Damiano Cunego (ITA)	Nippo–Vini Fantini	+ 8"
9	Antonio Parrinello (ITA)	D'Amico–Bottecchia	+ 8"
10	Francesco Gavazzi (ITA)	Southeast Pro Cycling	+ 8"
Source: ProCyclingStats
