= 2015 Coppa Ugo Agostoni =

2015 Coppa Agostoni
2015 UCI Europe Tour

Race details
- Dates: 16 September
- Stages: 1
- Distance: 198.2 km (123.2 mi)
- Winning time: 5h 04' 28"

Results
	Winner	Davide Rebellin (ITA)	(CCC–Sprandi–Polkowice)
	Second	Vincenzo Nibali (ITA)	(Astana)
	Third	Niccolò Bonifazio (ITA)	(Lampre–Merida)

The 2015 Ugo Agostoni was a one-day cycling semi-classic that took place on 16 September 2015, starting in Monza and finishing in Lissone in northern Italy. It was the first leg of the 2015 Trittico Lombardo and the 69th edition of the Coppa Ugo Agostoni. The race was won by Davide Rebellin (CCC–Sprandi–Polkowice), who sprinted to the race victory ahead of his breakaway companion Vincenzo Nibali (Astana). Niccolò Bonifazio (Lampre–Merida won the sprint for third. Nibali went on to win the Coppa Bernocchi and the Tre Valli Varesine to win the Trittico Lombardo competition.

== Results ==
Result
Rank	Rider	Team	Time
1	Davide Rebellin (ITA)	CCC–Sprandi–Polkowice	5hr 04' 28"
2	Vincenzo Nibali (ITA)	Astana	+ 0"
3	Niccolò Bonifazio (ITA)	Lampre–Merida	+ 0"
4	Giacomo Nizzolo (ITA)	Italy	+ 0"
5	Sonny Colbrelli (ITA)	Bardiani–CSF	+ 0"
6	Andrea Pasqualon (ITA)	Roth–Škoda	+ 0"
7	Simone Ponzi (ITA)	Southeast Pro Cycling	+ 0"
8	Maciej Paterski (POL)	CCC–Sprandi–Polkowice	+ 0"
9	Enrico Gasparotto (ITA)	Wanty–Groupe Gobert	+ 0"
10	Antonio Parrinello (ITA)	D'Amico–Bottecchia	+ 0"
Source: ProCyclingStats
