= 2015 Gran Premio Nobili Rubinetterie =

2015 UCI Europe Tour

Race details
- Dates: 19 March 2015
- Distance: 187.5 km (116.5 mi)
- Winning time: 4h 00' 19"

Results
	Winner	Giacomo Nizzolo (ITA)	(Trek Factory Racing)
	Second	Simone Ponzi (ITA)	(Southeast Pro Cycling)
	Third	Marco Haller (AUT)	(Team Katusha)

The 2015 Gran Premio Nobili Rubinetterie was the 18th and final edition of the Gran Premio Nobili Rubinetterie one-day cycling classic, organised by the Associazione Ciclista Arona. The race took place on 19 March 2015. For the only time in the race's history, it was rated as a 1.HC race as part of the 2015 UCI Europe Tour; all previous editions were at the lower 1.1 rank. The defending champion from the 2014 edition was Simone Ponzi (Southeast Pro Cycling), who also won the race in 2011. The race took place around Lake Maggiore in the Italian region of Piedmont, finishing in the town of Stresa.

A large group broke away from the peloton after 80 kilometres (50 miles). These riders stayed away for about 85 kilometres (53 miles), when the groups came back together. There were late attacks from riders including Alejandro Valverde (Movistar Team) and Davide Rebellin (CCC–Sprandi–Polkowice), but these were controlled by the sprinters' teams. The race was won in the sprint by Giacomo Nizzolo (Trek Factory Racing) ahead of Ponzi, with Marco Haller (Team Katusha) in third place.

== Teams ==
24 teams were selected to take part in the race. Eight of these were UCI WorldTeams; ten were UCI Professional Continental teams; five were UCI Continental teams; and one was a national team.

UCI WorldTeams

- AG2R La Mondiale
- Trek Factory Racing
- FDJ
- Movistar Team
- Orica–GreenEDGE
- Cannondale–Garmin
- Team Katusha
- Tinkoff–Saxo

UCI Professional Continental teams

- Caja Rural–Seguros RGA
- CCC–Sprandi–Polkowice
- Colombia
- Nippo–Vini Fantini
- RusVelo
- Southeast Pro Cycling
- Drapac Professional Cycling
- Team Novo Nordisk
- Bardiani–CSF
- Androni Giocattoli

UCI Continental teams

- Team Idea 2010 ASD
- D'Amico–Bottecchia
- GM Cycling Team
- MG.K Vis–Vega
- Unieuro–Wilier

National teams

- Italy

== Results ==
Result
Rank	Rider	Team	Time
1	Giacomo Nizzolo (ITA)	Trek Factory Racing	4h 00' 19"
2	Simone Ponzi (ITA)	Southeast Pro Cycling	+ 0"
3	Marco Haller (AUT)	Team Katusha	+ 0"
4	Juan José Lobato (ESP)	Movistar Team	+ 0"
5	Grega Bole (SLO)	CCC–Sprandi–Polkowice	+ 0"
6	Oscar Gatto (ITA)	Androni Giocattoli	+ 0"
7	Iuri Filosi (ITA)	Nippo–Vini Fantini	+ 0"
8	Matteo Montaguti (ITA)	AG2R La Mondiale	+ 0"
9	Antonino Parrinello (ITA)	D'Amico–Bottecchia	+ 0"
10	Francesco Reda (ITA)	Team Idea 2010 ASD	+ 0"
