= Trofeo Città di Brescia (cycling) =

Race details
- Date: June
- Region: Lombardy
- English name: Trophy City of Brescia
- Discipline: Road race
- Competition: UCI Europe Tour
- Type: Single day race
- Organiser: Gruppo Sportivo Città di Brescia
- Race director: Roberto Sardi

History
- First edition: 1997
- Editions: 29 (as of 2026)
- First winner: Gerrit Glomser (AUT)
- Most wins: Carlo Tonon (ITA); Mirko Gualdi (ITA) (2 wins)
- Most recent: Luca Colnaghi (ITA)

The Trofeo Città di Brescia is a professional one day cycling race held annually in Italy. The race starts and finishes in the city of Brescia. It was on the UCI Europe Tour as a category 1.2 race from 2005 to 2010 and again from 2017. The race was cancelled in 2020 and 2021.

== Winners ==
Year	Winner	Second	Third
1997	(Austria) Gerrit Glomser		
1998	(Italy) Francesco Pasquini		
1999	(Italy) Luca Paolini		
2000	(Italy) Antonio Salomone		
2001	(Germany) Markus Knopfle		
2002	(Italy) Simone Lo Vano	(Italy) Federico Berta	(Italy) Alessandro Del Sarto
2003	(Italy) Roberto Savoldi	(Australia) Mark Renshaw	(Italy) Claudio Corioni
2004	(Italy) Claudio Corioni	(Italy) Aristide Ratti	(Uzbekistan) Denis Shkarpeta
2005	(Italy) Matteo Bono	(Argentina) Alejandro Borrajo	(Italy) Francesco Reda
2006	(Italy) Roberto Ferrari	(Australia) Matthew Goss	(Italy) Roberto Longo
2007	(Italy) Luca Gasparini	(Italy) Fabio Donesana	(Italy) Cesare Benedetti
2008	(Italy) Giuseppe De Maria	(Italy) Giovanni Carini	(Slovenia) Bostjan Rezman
2009	(Italy) Andrea Palini	(Italy) Andrea Pasqualon	(Italy) Mirko Battaglini
2010	(Italy) Manuele Boaro	(Italy) Elia Favilli	(Italy) Federico Rocchetti
2011	(Italy) Enrico Battaglin	(Italy) Moreno Moser	(Italy) Nicola Boem
2012	(Italy) Davide Villella	(Italy) Nicola Ruffon	(Italy) Thomas Fiumana
2013	(Russia) Ivan Balykin	(Italy) Michele Simoni	(Italy) Nicola Ruffoni
2014	(Italy) Marco Tizza	(Italy) Gianluca Milani	(Italy) Andrea Toniatti
2015	(Italy) Gian Marco Di Francesco	(Italy) Mirco Maestri	(Italy) Marco Tizza
2016	(Italy) Alessandro Bresciani	(Italy) Nicola Gaffurini	(Italy) Matteo Moschetti
2017	(Belarus) Nikolai Shumov	(Italy) Nicolò Rocchi	(Italy) Filippo Tagliani
2018	(Italy) Filippo Rocchetti	(Italy) Nicola Gaffurini	(Italy) Simone Ravanelli
2019	(Italy) Daniel Smarzaro	(Italy) Luca Mozzato	(Italy) Andrea Toniatti
2020	No race		
2021	(Italy) Giulio Masotto	(Italy) Matteo Zurlo	(Italy) Cristian Rocchetta
2022	(Italy) Riccardo Verza	(Italy) Lorenzo Quaturcci	(Italy) Francesco Di Felice
2023	(Italy) Federico Guzzo	(Italy) Matteo Zurlo	(Italy) Edoardo Zamperini
2024	(Italy) Manuel Oioli	(Ukraine) Andrii Ponomar	(Italy) Federico Guzzo
2025	(Italy) Giovanni Bortoluzzi	(Switzerland) Alexandre Balmer	(Italy) Riccardo Lorello
2026	(Italy) Luca Colnaghi	(Poland) Marcin Budziński	(Italy) Manuel Oioli
