= Federico Rocchetti =

Italian cyclist

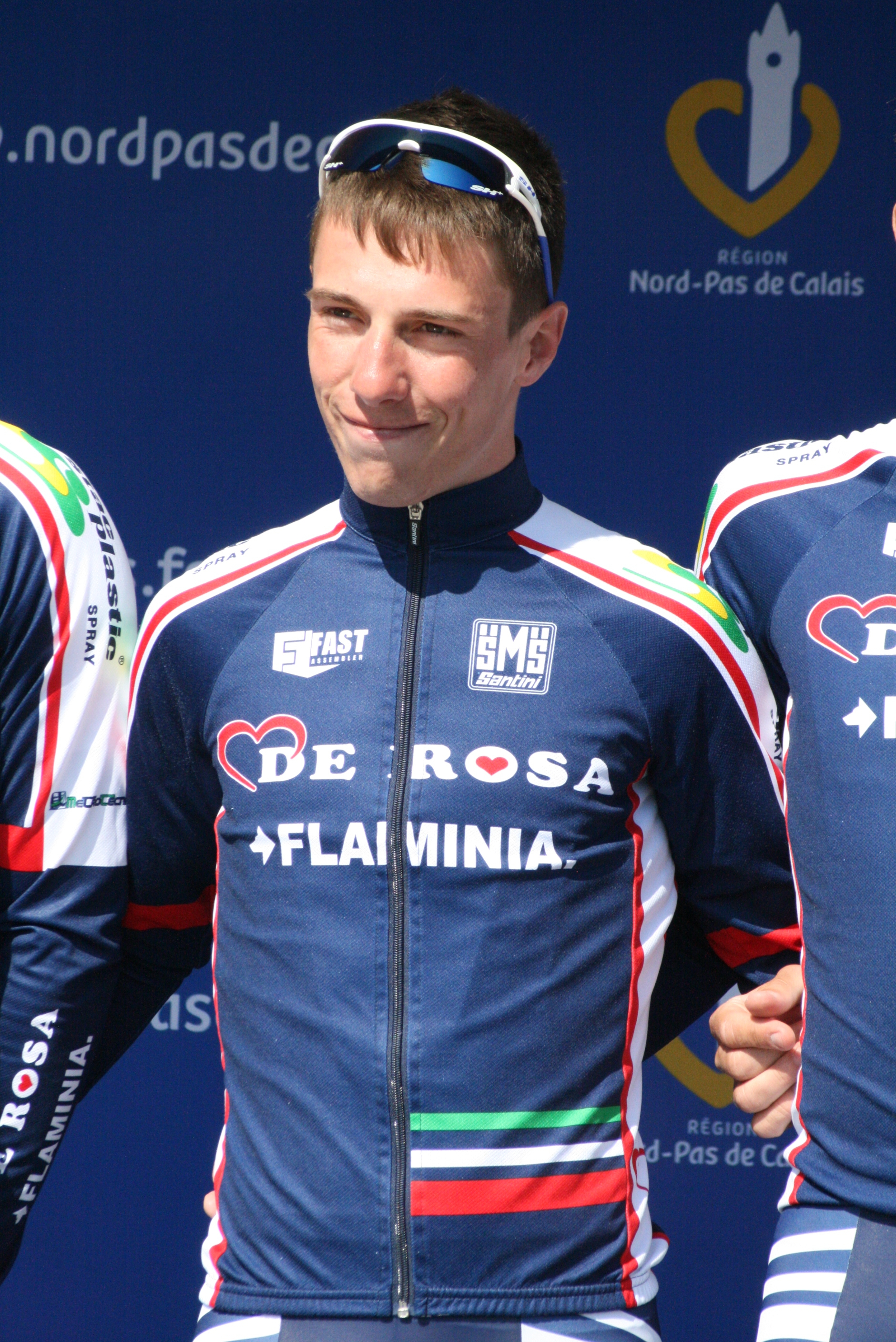

Personal information
- Born: 14 January 1986 (age 40) Italy

Cycling career
- Sport: Cycling
- Discipline: Road
- Role: Rider

Amateur teams
- 2007: UC Bergamasca 1902
- 2008: Pagnoncelli–NGC–Perrell
- 2009–2010: Casati NGC Perrel
- 2010: Lampre–Farnese Vini (stagiaire)

Professional team
- 2011–2013: De Rosa–Ceramica Flaminia

Federico Rocchetti (born 14 January 1986) is an Italian racing cyclist. He rode at the 2013 UCI Road World Championships.

== Major results ==
2009
6th GP Citta di Felino
7th Cronoscalata Gardone Val Trompia — Prati di Caregno
9th Trofeo Edil C
2010
3rd Trofeo Città di Brescia
2011
5th GP Nobili Rubinetterie
5th GP Industria & Artigianato
2012
10th Overall Giro della Provincia di Reggio Calabria
2013
1st Giro del Medio Brenta
3rd Central European Tour Miskolc GP
5th Giro dell'Appennino
9th Giro della Toscana
