= Andrea Di Renzo =

Italian cyclist

Personal information
- Born: 24 January 1995 (age 31) Lanciano, Italy
- Height: 1.79 m (5 ft 10 in)
- Weight: 62 kg (137 lb)

Cycling career
- Sport: Cycling
- Current team: Retired
- Discipline: Road
- Role: Rider
- Rider type: Climber

Amateur teams
- 2013: Sangro Bike e della Guarenna 2000
- 2014: Vini Fantini–Nippo–De Rosa
- 2015: Delio Gallina–Colosio–Eurofeed
- 2017–2019: UC Porto Sant'Elpidio

Professional teams
- 2016: GM Europa Ovini
- 2020–2021: Vini Zabù–KTM

Andrea Di Renzo (born 24 January 1995) is an Italian former racing cyclist, who competed as a professional with Vini Zabù–KTM from 2020 to 2021. He is the son of Marco Antonio Di Renzo, who was a professional cyclist from 1996 to 2000.

== Major results ==
2017
3rd Giro del Casentino
2018
3rd Overall Giro della Regione Friuli Venezia Giulia
2019
3rd Overall Tour of Malopolska
