= Paolo Ciavatta =

Italian bicycle racer

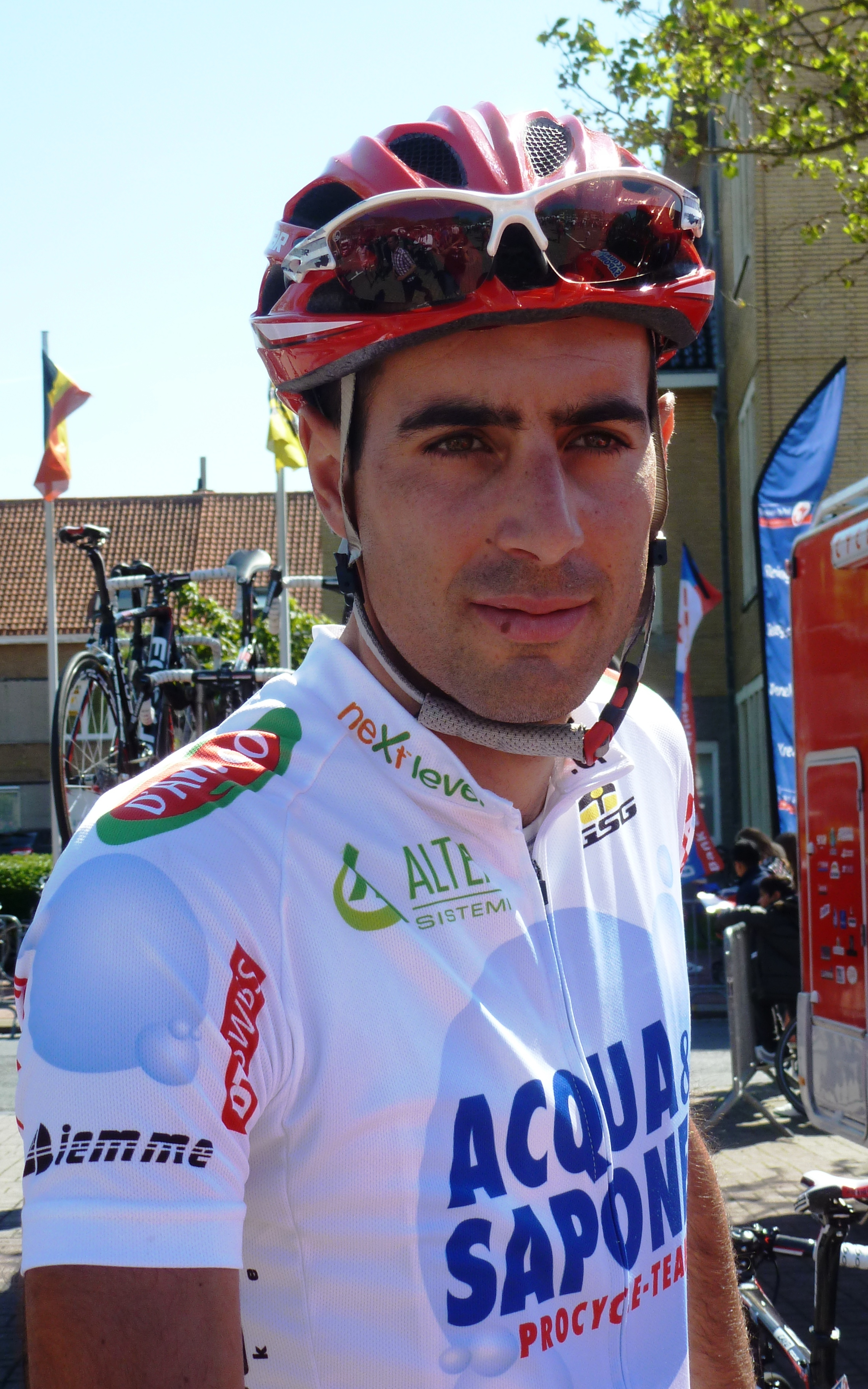
- Ciavatta in 2012

Personal information
- Full name: Paolo Ciavatta
- Born: 6 November 1984 (age 41) Nereto, Italy

Cycling career
- Sport: Cycling
- Current team: Retired
- Discipline: Road
- Role: Rider

Amateur teams
- 2004–2005: Italfer–Sofer–Centro Revisioni Cerone
- 2006–2007: Futura
- 2008–2009: SC Monturano–Civitanova Marche–Cascinare SRL
- 2009: Acqua & Sapone–Caffè Mokambo (stagiaire)

Professional teams
- 2010–2012: Acqua & Sapone
- 2014–2016: Area Zero Pro Team

Paolo Ciavatta (born 6 November 1984 in Nereto) is an Italian former professional cyclist, who rode professionally between 2010 and 2016 for the Acqua & Sapone and D'Amico–Bottecchia teams.

== Major results ==
2009
1st Giro del Cigno
2nd Gara Ciclistica Montappone
2nd Trofeo Salvatore Morucci
2010
5th Gran Premio Città di Camaiore
2011
9th Trofeo Laigueglia
2014
1st Mountains classification Vuelta a Castilla y León
10th Gran Premio di Lugano
2015
3rd GP Izola
6th Overall Sibiu Cycling Tour
2016
10th Coupe des Carpathes
