= 2015 Grote Prijs Jef Scherens =

Race details
- Dates: 23 August 2015
- Stages: 1
- Distance: 183.3 km (113.9 mi)
- Winning time: 4h 13' 21"

Results
	Winner	Björn Leukemans (BEL)
	Second	Dimitri Claeys (BEL)
	Third	Mark McNally (GBR)

The 2015 Grote Prijs Jef Scherens was the 49th edition of the Grote Prijs Jef Scherens cycle race and was held on 23 August 2015. The race started and finished in Leuven. The race was won by Björn Leukemans.

== General classification ==
Final general classification

Rank	Rider	Time
1	Björn Leukemans (BEL)	4h 13' 21"
2	Dimitri Claeys (BEL)	+ 7"
3	Mark McNally (GBR)	+ 7"
4	Wout van Aert (BEL)	+ 10"
5	Marco Marcato (ITA)	+ 10"
6	Gaëtan Bille (BEL)	+ 10"
7	Huub Duyn (NED)	+ 1' 01"
8	Oscar Riesebeek (NED)	+ 1' 03"
9	Dennis Vanendert (BEL)	+ 1' 03"
10	Sergey Nikolaev (RUS)	+ 1' 05"
