= Edoardo Zamperini =

Italian racing cyclist

- Zamperini in 2026

Personal information
- Born: 19 March 2003 (age 23) Grezzana, Italy
- Height: 1.78 m (5 ft 10 in)

Cycling career
- Sport: Cycling
- Current team: Cofidis
- Discipline: Road
- Role: Rider

Amateur teams
- 2020–2021: Team Assali Stefen Omap
- 2024: UC Trevigiani–Energiapura–Marchiol

Professional teams
- 2022–2023: Zalf Euromobil Fior
- 2025: Arkéa–B&B Hôtels Continentale
- 2026–: Cofidis

Edoardo Zamperini (born 19 March 2003) is an Italian cyclist, who currently rides for UCI ProTeam Cofidis.

== Major results ==
2021
2nd Road race, National Junior Road Championships
9th Trofeo Guido Dorigo
2022
5th Gran Premio Industrie del Marmo
2023
1st GP Kranj
1st Giro del Casentino
3rd Trofeo Città di Brescia
5th Trofeo Piva
2024
1st Road race, National Under-23 Road Championships
2nd Giro della Provincia di Biella
4th Trofeo Città di Brescia
4th G.P. Palio del Recioto
6th Trofeo Piva
6th Coppa della Pace
7th Coppa Città di San Daniele
7th Giro del Belvedere
9th Giro del Medio Brenta
10th Overall Giro della Regione Friuli Venezia Giulia
2025
1st Stage 4 Orlen Nations Grand Prix
