= Sergey Nikolaev (cyclist) =

Russian cyclist

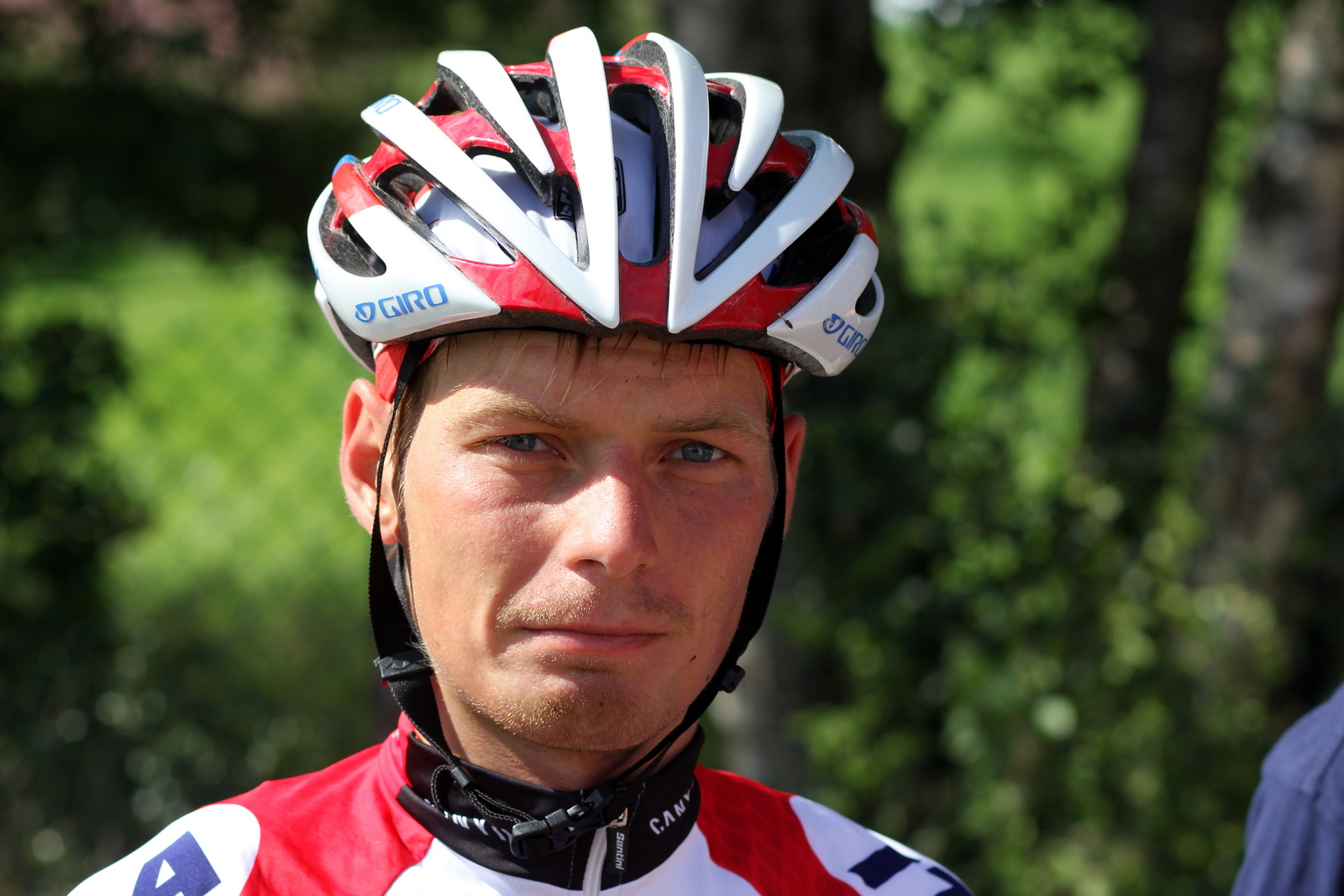
- Nikolaev at the 2013 Tour des Fjords

Personal information
- Born: February 5, 1988 (age 38) Moscow, Russia

Cycling career
- Sport: Cycling
- Discipline: Road
- Role: Rider

Professional teams
- 2013–2015: Itera–Katusha
- 2013: Team Katusha (stagiaire)
- 2015–2017: RusVelo
- 2019: China Continental Team of Gansu Bank

Sergey Nikolaev (born February 5, 1988, in Moscow) is a Russian cyclist, who last rode for UCI Continental team China Continental Team of Gansu Bank.

== Major results ==
2011
4th Grand Prix of Moscow
2012
2nd Overall Friendship People North-Caucasus Stage Race

1st Stage 3

8th Race Horizon Park
2013
1st Memorial Viktor Kapitonov
1st Stage 4 Friendship People North-Caucasus Stage Race
1st Stage 3 (TTT) Tour des Fjords
5th Overall Okolo Slovenska

1st Points classification
1st Stage 2

9th Central European Tour Budapest GP
10th Grand Prix of Sochi
2014
Grand Prix Udmurtskaya Pravda

1st Points classification
1st Stages 2 & 3

1st Prologue Five Rings of Moscow
3rd Overall Tour de Serbie

1st Mountains classification

5th Grand Prix Sarajevo
8th Poreč Trophy
9th Overall Grand Prix of Adygeya
2015
1st Mountains classification Okolo Slovenska
1st Prologue Five Rings of Moscow
2nd Time trial, National Road Championships
2nd Overall Istrian Spring Trophy

1st Stage 1

2nd Overall Grand Prix of Adygeya

1st Stage 1 (TTT)

3rd Overall Tour of Kuban
3rd Trofej Umag
4th Overall Grand Prix of Sochi

1st Stage 1 (TTT)

4th Maykop–Ulyap–Maykop
4th Duo Normand (with Andrey Solomennikov)
5th Memorial Oleg Dyachenko
6th Poreč Trophy
8th Krasnodar–Anapa
9th GP Izola
10th Overall Sibiu Cycling Tour
10th Grote Prijs Jef Scherens
