= Sergey Pomoshnikov =

Russian cyclist (born 1990)

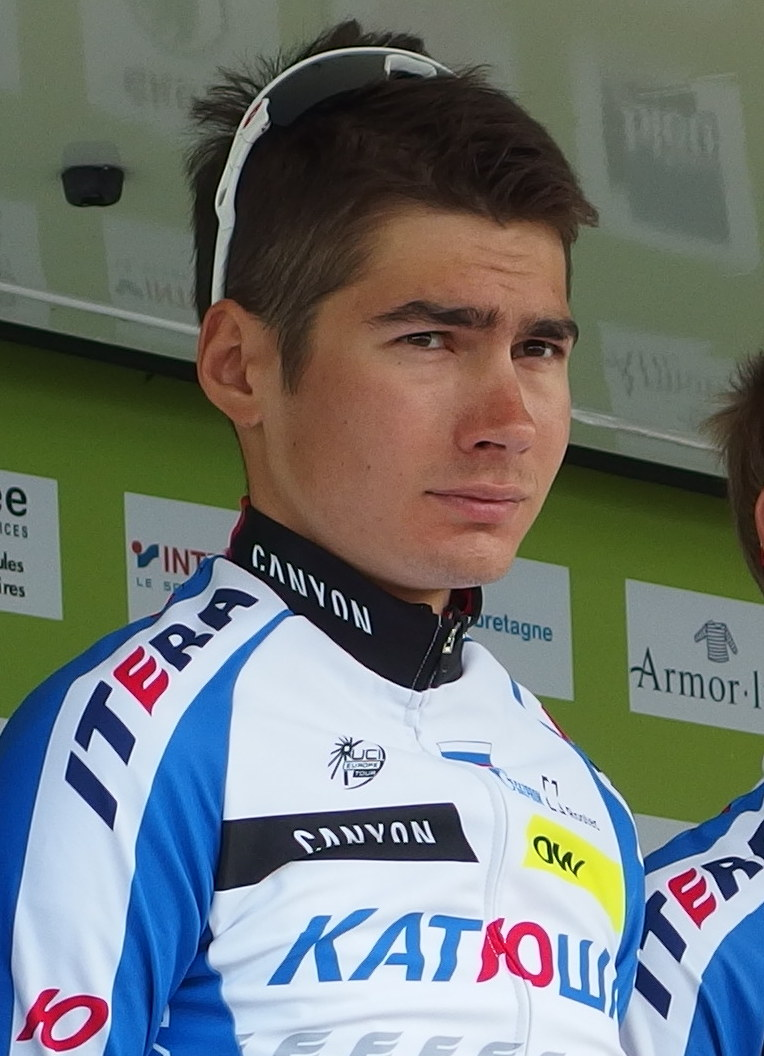
- Pomoshnikov at the 2015 Tour de Bretagne

Personal information
- Full name: Sergey Pomoshnikov
- Born: 17 July 1990 (age 36) Kuybyshev, Russian SFSR, Soviet Union (now Samara, Samara Oblast, Russia)

Cycling career
- Sport: Cycling
- Discipline: Road
- Role: Rider

Amateur team
- 2020–2022: Biemme Garda Sport

Professional teams
- 2012: Itera–Katusha
- 2013–2014: RusVelo
- 2015: Itera–Katusha

Sergey Pomoshnikov (born 17 July 1990) is a racing cyclist, who represented Russia in professional road cycling, and represents Italy in Gran Fondo events.

== Major results ==
2012
1st Grand Prix des Marbriers
1st Stage 1 Tour of Bulgaria
6th Overall Tour de l'Avenir

1st Stage 6

9th Overall Istrian Spring Trophy
10th Trofeo Zsšdi
2013
7th Gran Premio Bruno Beghelli
2014
10th Giro dell'Appennino
2015
2nd Overall Tour de Serbie

1st Stage 3

5th Grand Prix Sarajevo
7th Giro del Medio Brenta
8th Overall Sibiu Cycling Tour
9th Overall Black Sea Cycling Tour
10th Overall Tour of Bulgaria
2021
3rd Men's 18–34 race, UEC European Gran Fondo Championships
