= 2015 Lampre–Merida season =

Lampre–Merida
- 2015 season
- UCI code: LAM
- Status: UCI ProTeam
- Manager: Giuseppe Saronni
- Main sponsor(s): Lampre & Merida
- Based: Italy
- Bicycles: Merida
- Groupset: Shimano

Season victories
- One-day races: 3
- Stage race overall: 3
- Stage race stages: 17
- National Championships: 5

The 2015 season for Lampre–Merida began in January at the Tour de San Luis. As a UCI WorldTeam, they were automatically invited and obligated to send a squad to every event in the UCI World Tour.

== Team roster ==
As of 1 January 2015

Rider	Date of birth
Niccolò Bonifazio (ITA)	29 October 1993 (aged 21)
Matteo Bono (ITA)	11 November 1983 (aged 31)
Mattia Cattaneo (ITA)	25 October 1990 (aged 24)
Davide Cimolai (ITA)	13 August 1989 (aged 25)
Valerio Conti (ITA)	30 March 1993 (aged 21)
Mário Costa (POR)	15 November 1985 (aged 29)
Rui Costa (POR)	5 October 1986 (aged 28)
Kristijan Đurasek (CRO)	26 July 1987 (aged 27)
Chun Kai Feng (TWN)	2 November 1988 (aged 26)
Roberto Ferrari (ITA)	9 March 1983 (aged 31)
Tsgabu Grmay (ETH)	25 August 1991 (aged 23)
Ilia Koshevoy (BLR)	20 March 1991 (aged 23)
Sacha Modolo (ITA)	19 June 1987 (aged 27)

Rider	Date of birth
Manuele Mori (ITA)	9 August 1980 (aged 34)
Przemysław Niemiec (POL)	11 April 1980 (aged 34)
Nelson Oliveira (POR)	6 March 1989 (aged 25)
Luka Pibernik (SLO)	23 November 1993 (aged 21)
Rubén Plaza (ESP)	29 December 1980 (aged 34)
Jan Polanc (SLO)	6 May 1992 (aged 22)
Filippo Pozzato (ITA)	10 September 1981 (aged 33)
Maximiliano Richeze (ARG)	7 March 1983 (aged 30)
José Serpa (COL)	17 April 1979 (aged 35)
Diego Ulissi (ITA)	15 July 1989 (aged 25)
Rafael Valls (ESP)	27 June 1987 (aged 27)
Xu Gang (CHN)	28 January 1984 (aged 30)

Riders who joined the team for the 2015 season

Rider	2014 team
Mário Costa	ex-pro (OFM–Quinta da Lixa)
Chun Kai Feng	ex-pro (Team Gusto)
Tsgabu Grmay	MTN–Qhubeka
Ilia Koshevoy	neo-pro (Podenzano-Tecninox)
Luka Pibernik	neo-pro (Radenska)
Rubén Plaza	Movistar Team

Riders who left the team during or after the 2014 season

Rider	2015 team
Winner Anacona	Movistar Team
Damiano Cunego	Nippo–Vini Fantini
Luca Dodi	
Elia Favilli	SouthEast
Chris Horner	Airgas-Safeway
Andrea Palini	Skydive Dubai Pro Cycling
Luca Wackermann	SouthEast

== Season victories ==
Date	Race	Competition	Rider	Country	Location
19 February	Trofeo Laigueglia	UCI Europe Tour	Davide Cimolai (ITA)	Italy	Laigueglia
20 February	Tour of Oman, Stage 4	UCI Asia Tour	Rafael Valls (ESP)	Oman	Jebel Akhdar
22 February	Tour of Oman, Overall	UCI Asia Tour	Rafael Valls (ESP)	Oman	
1 March	Gran Premio di Lugano	UCI Europe Tour	Niccolò Bonifazio (ITA)	Switzerland	Lugano
13 March	Paris–Nice, Stage 5	UCI World Tour	Davide Cimolai (ITA)	France	Rasteau
30 April	Tour of Turkey, Stage 5	UCI Europe Tour	Sacha Modolo (ITA)	Turkey	Pamukkale
3 May	Tour of Turkey, Overall	UCI Europe Tour	Kristijan Đurasek (CRO)	Turkey	
13 May	Giro d'Italia, Stage 5	UCI World Tour	Jan Polanc (SLO)	Italy	Abetone
15 May	Giro d'Italia, Stage 7	UCI World Tour	Diego Ulissi (ITA)	Italy	Fiuggi
22 May	Giro d'Italia, Stage 13	UCI World Tour	Sacha Modolo (ITA)	Italy	Jesolo
23 May	Tour of Japan, Stage 6	UCI Asia Tour	Valerio Conti (ITA)	Japan	Izu
24 May	Tour of Japan, Stage 7	UCI Asia Tour	Niccolò Bonifazio (ITA)	Japan	Tokyo
24 May	Tour of Japan, Points classification	UCI Asia Tour	Valerio Conti (ITA)	Japan	
24 May	Tour of Japan, Young rider classification	UCI Asia Tour	Ilia Koshevoy (BLR)	Japan	
27 May	Giro d'Italia, Stage 17	UCI World Tour	Sacha Modolo (ITA)	Switzerland	Lugano
12 June	Critérium du Dauphiné, Stage 6	UCI World Tour	Rui Costa (POR)	France	Villard-de-Lans
14 June	Tour de Suisse, Stage 2	UCI World Tour	Kristijan Đurasek (CRO)	Switzerland	Risch-Rotkreuz
11 July	Tour of Qinghai Lake, Stage 7	UCI Asia Tour	Ilia Koshevoy (BLR)	China	Xunhua
20 July	Tour de France, Stage 16	UCI World Tour	Rubén Plaza (ESP)	France	Gap
4 September	Vuelta a España, Stage 13	UCI World Tour	Nelson Oliveira (POR)	Spain	Tarazona
12 September	Vuelta a España, Stage 20	UCI World Tour	Rubén Plaza (ESP)	Spain	Cercedilla
19 September	Memorial Marco Pantani	UCI Europe Tour	Diego Ulissi (ITA)	Italy	Cesenatico
22 October	Tour of Hainan, Stage 3	UCI Asia Tour	Sacha Modolo (ITA)	China	Haikou
23 October	Tour of Hainan, Stage 4	UCI Asia Tour	Sacha Modolo (ITA)	China	Chengmai
28 October	Tour of Hainan, Overall	UCI Asia Tour	Sacha Modolo (ITA)	China	
28 October	Tour of Hainan, Points classification	UCI Asia Tour	Sacha Modolo (ITA)	China	

== National, Continental and World champions 2015 ==
Date	Race	Jersey	Rider	Country	Location
11 February	African Time Trial Championships		Tsgabu Grmay (ETH)	South Africa	Wartburg
26 June	Portuguese National Time Trial Championships		Nelson Oliveira (POR)	Portugal	Braga
26 June	Ethiopia National Time Trial Championships		Tsgabu Grmay (ETH)	Ethiopia	Jimma
28 June	Ethiopia National Road Race Championships		Tsgabu Grmay (ETH)	Ethiopia	Jimma
28 June	Portuguese National Road Race Championships		Rui Costa (POR)	Portugal	Braga
28 June	Slovenian National Road Race Championships		Luka Pibernik (SLO)	Slovenia	Mirna Peč
