= Carlos Giménez (cyclist) =

Venezuelan cyclist

Personal information
- Born: 7 May 1995 (age 31) Barquisimeto, Venezuela
- Height: 1.64 m (5 ft 5 in)
- Weight: 53 kg (117 lb)

Cycling career
- Sport: Cycling
- Discipline: Road
- Role: Rider

Amateur team
- 2014: Maltinti Lampadari-Banca di Cambiano

Professional team
- 2015: Androni Giocattoli

Carlos Giménez (born 7 May 1995) is a Venezuelan professional racing cyclist, who last rode for UCI Professional Continental team Androni Giocattoli–Sidermec.
