= Mark McNally (cyclist) =

British cyclist

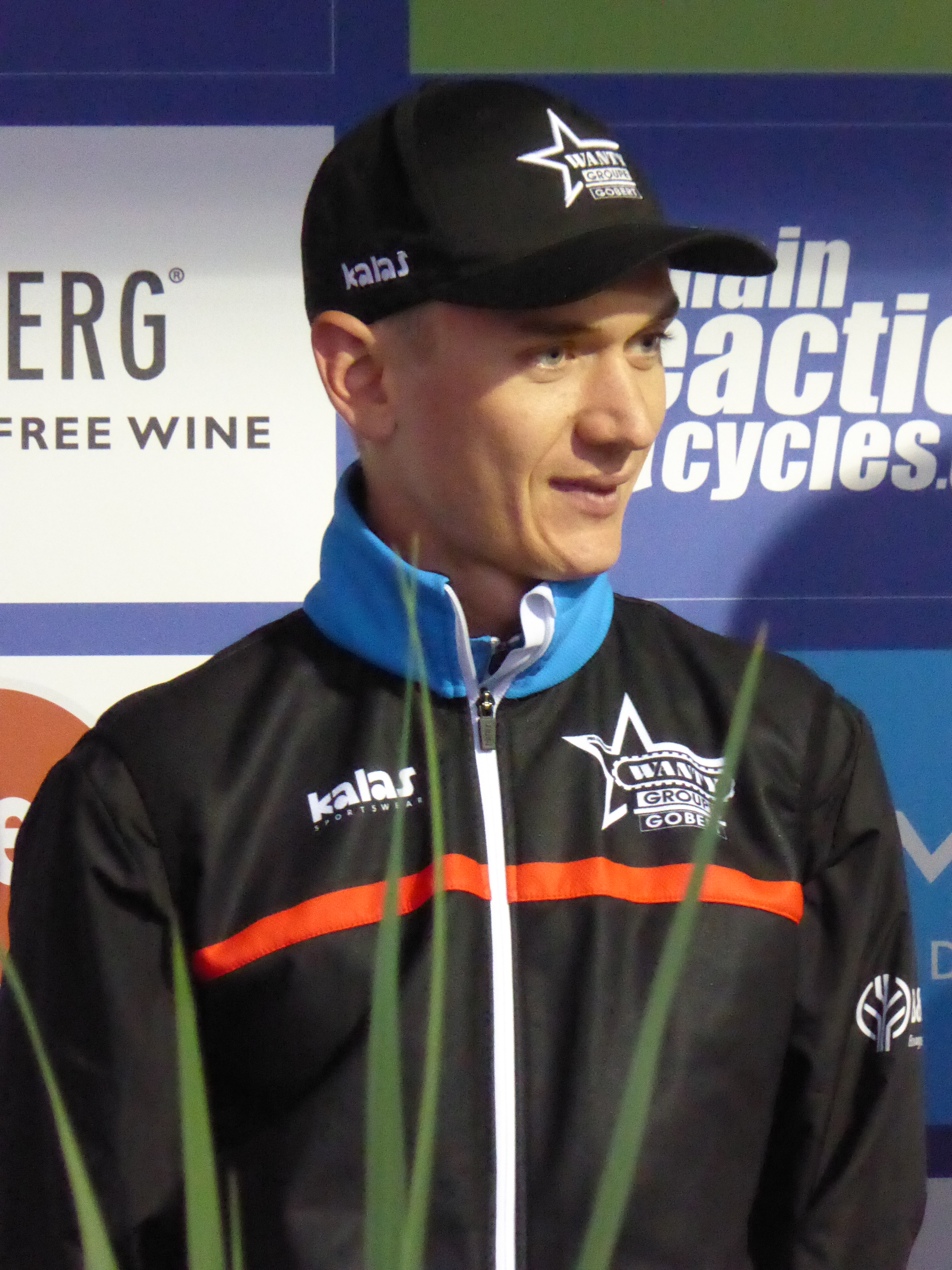
- McNally at the 2016 Tour of Britain.

Personal information
- Full name: Mark Thomas McNally
- Born: 20 July 1989 (age 37) Fazakerley, Liverpool, England
- Height: 1.82 m (6 ft 0 in)
- Weight: 74 kg (163 lb; 11.7 st)

Cycling career
- Sport: Cycling
- Current team: Team Drali–Repsol
- Discipline: Road
- Role: Rider (retired); Directeur sportif

Professional teams
- 2009: Team Halfords
- 2010–2014: An Post–Sean Kelly
- 2015: Madison Genesis
- 2016–2018: Wanty–Groupe Gobert

Managerial team
- 2022–: Team Coop

Mark Thomas McNally (born 20 July 1989) is a British former professional road and track racing cyclist, who rode professionally between 2009 and 2018 for four different professional teams. He now works as a directeur sportif for UCI Continental team Team Drali–Repsol.

== Biography ==
McNally was born in Fazakerley, Liverpool. He took up cycling after watching the 2000 Summer Olympics on television. In November 2014, Madison Genesis announced that McNally would join them for the 2015 season.

== Major results ==
2007
1st Team pursuit, UEC European Junior Track Championships
2nd Individual pursuit, National Junior Track Championships
5th Road race, UEC European Under-23 Road Championships
2008
1st Team pursuit, UEC European Under-23 Track Championships
2nd Points race, National Track Championships
2009
3rd Beaumont Trophy
4th Colne Town Centre Grand Prix
2011
1st Overall Mi-Août Bretonne
2nd Zellik–Galmaarden
3rd Omloop van het Houtland
3rd GP Raf Jonckheere
4th Houtem-Vilvoorde
6th Omloop Het Nieuwsblad Beloften
7th Internationale Wielertrofee Jong Maar Moedig
8th Belsele Individueel
2012
1st Grote Prijs Beeckman-De Caluwé
3rd Zellik–Galmaarden
7th Beverbeek Classic
7th GP Raf Jonckheere
8th GP Lanssens Crelan Individueel
10th Grote Prijs Stad Zottegem
2013
4th GP Briek Schotte
5th Grote Prijs Stad Geel
2014
1st Mountains classification Tour of Britain
3rd Rutland–Melton CiCLE Classic
4th GP Maurice Raes
5th Baronie Breda Classic
10th Omloop der Kempen
2015
1st GP Lucien Van Impe
3rd Grote Prijs Jef Scherens
4th London Nocturne
5th Overall Tour of the Reservoir
7th Chorley Grand Prix
7th Leicester Castle Classic
10th Grote Prijs Stad Zottegem
2016
2nd Ronde van Drenthe
4th Road race, National Road Championships
5th Internationale Wielertrofee Jong Maar Moedig
10th London–Surrey Classic
2017
1st Sprints classification Tour of Britain
3rd GP Paul Borremans Viane-Geraardsbergen
10th Ronde van Limburg
2018
4th Grand Prix d'Isbergues
