= Marco D'Urbano =

Italian cyclist

Personal information
- Full name: Marco D'Urbano
- Born: 15 August 1991 (age 35) Pescara, Italy

Cycling career
- Sport: Cycling
- Current team: Retired
- Discipline: Road
- Role: Rider

Amateur teams
- 2008: Team Di Federico
- 2009: Veloclub Notaresco 999
- 2011–2014: Aran–D'Angelo & Antenucci

Professional teams
- 2015: GM Cycling Team
- 2016: Team Roth
- 2017: Androni Giocattoli–Sidermec

Marco D'Urbano (born 15 August 1991) is an Italian former professional cyclist, who rode professionally between 2015 and 2017 for the GM Cycling Team, Team Roth and Androni Giocattoli–Sidermec teams. In 2015, he won the second stage of the Rhône-Alpes Isère Tour.
