= Marcello Neri =

Italian cyclist

Personal information
- Born: 2 February 1902 Fauglia, Italy
- Died: 23 December 1993 (aged 91) Firenzuola, Italy

Cycling career
- Sport: Cycling

Marcello Neri (2 February 1902 – 23 December 1993) was an Italian cyclist. He competed in the individual and team road race events at the 1928 Summer Olympics.
