= Alberto Nardin =

Italian cyclist

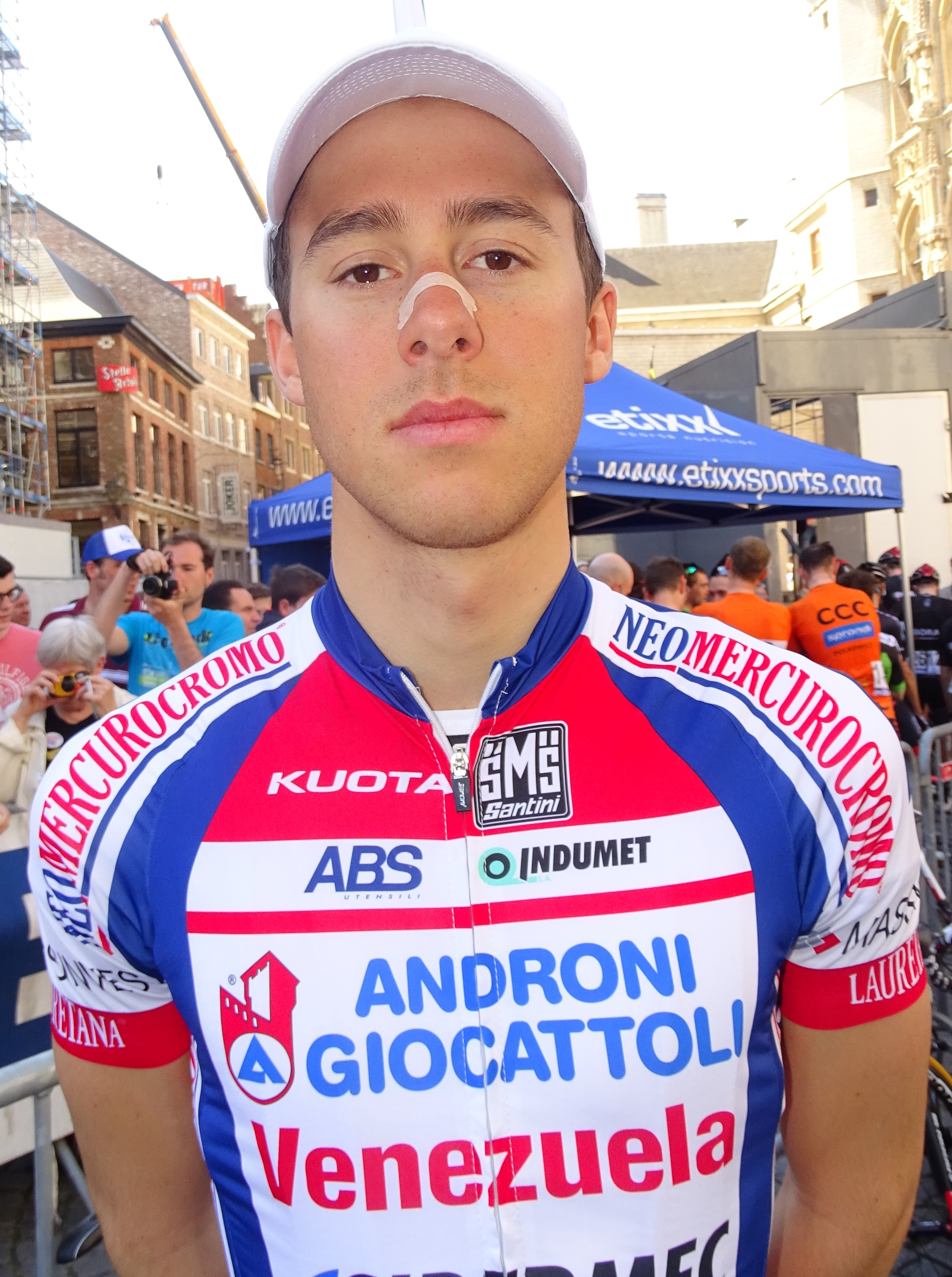
- Nardin in 2015.

Personal information
- Born: 30 April 1990 (age 36)

Cycling career
- Sport: Cycling
- Current team: Retired
- Discipline: Road
- Role: Rider

Amateur teams
- 2009: Big
- 2010–2011: Brunero–Camel–Pedalando in Langa
- 2012: Viris Maserati
- 2013: Asd Monviso–Venezia
- 2014: Overall

Professional team
- 2015–2016: Androni Giocattoli

Alberto Nardin (born 30 April 1990) is an Italian former racing cyclist, who competed professionally for UCI Professional Continental team Androni Giocattoli–Sidermec in 2015 and 2016. He began his professional cycling career in 2015 and made his debut at the Vuelta al Táchira.

== Major results ==
2011
8th Gran Premio San Giuseppe
