= 2014 Tre Valli Varesine =

Tre Valli Varesine
2014 UCI Europe Tour

Race details
- Dates: September 18
- Stages: 1
- Distance: 199.4 km (123.9 mi)
- Winning time: 5 hr 14 min 39 sec

Results
	Winner	Michael Albasini (Switzerland)	(Orica–GreenEDGE)
	Second	Sonny Colbrelli (Italy)	(Bardiani–CSF)
	Third	Filippo Pozzato (Italy)	(Lampre–Merida)

The 2014 Tre Valli Varesine was the 94th edition of the Tre Valli Varesine single-day cycling race. While previous editions were held in August, the 2014 edition was raced on 18 September. The organizers of the race planned to attract more top-rank riders by moving the date of the race towards closer to the World Championship, so that cyclist who planned to compete in the World Championship could participate to the Tre Valli Varesine in preparation. The race started in Luino and concluded in Varese, after 199.4 km.

The race has been won by Michael Albasini of Orica–GreenEDGE, ahead of Italian riders Sonny Colbrelli (Bardiani–CSF) and Filippo Pozzato (Lampre–Merida).

== Teams ==
A total of 23 teams and 181 riders took part to the race

UCI ProTeams
- Astana
- Lampre–Merida
- Cannondale
- Orica–GreenEDGE
UCI Professional Continental Teams
- Neri Sottoli
- Androni Giocattoli–Venezuela
- Bardiani–CSF
- Colombia
- Wanty–Groupe Gobert
- CCC–Polsat–Polkowice
- MTN–Qhubeka
- Topsport Vlaanderen–Baloise
- NetApp–Endura
- RusVelo
- Caja Rural–Seguros RGA
- Bretagne–Séché Environnement
UCI Continental Teams
- Team Idea
- MG Kvis–Wilier
- Marchiol–Emisfero
- Area Zero Pro Team
- Efapel–Glassdrive
- Nankang–Fondriest
National Teams
- Italy

== Results ==
	Cyclist	Team	Time
1	Michael Albasini (SUI)	Orica–GreenEDGE	5h 14' 39"
2	Sonny Colbrelli (ITA)	Bardiani–CSF	+ 0"
3	Filippo Pozzato (ITA)	Lampre–Merida	+ 0"
4	Davide Rebellin (ITA)	CCC–Polsat–Polkowice	+ 0"
5	Damiano Caruso (ITA)	Cannondale	+ 0"
6	Mauro Finetto (ITA)	Neri Sottoli	+ 0"
7	Kristijan Đurasek (CRO)	Lampre–Merida	+ 4"
8	Edoardo Zardini (ITA)	Bardiani–CSF	+ 7"
9	Enrico Gasparotto (ITA)	Astana	+ 22"
10	Antonio Parrinello (ITA)	Androni Giocattoli–Venezuela	+ 1' 23"
