= Marcin Budziński =

Marcin Budziński may refer to:

- Marcin Budziński (footballer) (born 1990), Polish professional footballer
- Marcin Budziński (cyclist) (born 1998), Polish professional racing cyclist
