= Gran Premio Nobili Rubinetterie =

Italian one-day road cycling race

Race details
- Date: Late August (until 2012); March (2013–2015)
- Region: Province of Novara, Italy
- Local name(s): Gran Premio Nobili Rubinetterie (in Italian)
- Discipline: Road
- Competition: UCI Europe Tour
- Type: Single-day
- Organiser: Associazione Ciclistica Arona
- Web site: www.ciclisticaparona.com

History
- First edition: 1997
- Editions: 18
- Final edition: 2015
- First winner: Dario Andriotto (ITA)
- Most wins: Damiano Cunego (ITA) (2 wins)
- Final winner: Giacomo Nizzolo (ITA)

The Gran Premio Nobili Rubinetterie was a single-day road bicycle race held annually in Arona, Italy between 1997 and 2015. It was held primarily as a 1.1 event on the UCI Europe Tour. In 2010 the GP was split in two challenges, Coppa Papà Carlo and Coppa Città di Stresa, but reverted to a single race – on the route of the Coppa Città di Stresa – in 2012.

== Winners ==
=== As a stand-alone race ===
Year	Country	Rider	Team
1997	Italy	Dario Andriotto (Note: Held as the Italian National Time Trial Championships.)	Amore & Vita–ForzArcore
1998	No race		
1999	Italy	Ivan Gotti	Polti
2000	Italy	Stefano Garzelli	Mercatone Uno–Albacom
2001	Lithuania	Vladimir Smirnov	Ceresit–CCC–Mat
2002	Estonia	Andrus Aug	De Nardi–Pasta Montegrappa
2003	Italy	Andrea Ferrigato	Alessio
2004	Italy	Damiano Cunego	Saeco
2005	Italy	Damiano Cunego	Lampre–Caffita
2006	Italy	Paolo Longo Borghini	Ceramica Flaminia–Bossini Docce
2007	Colombia	Luis Felipe Laverde	Ceramica Panaria–Navigare
2008	Italy	Giampaolo Cheula	Barloworld
2009	Slovenia	Grega Bole	Amica Chips–Knauf
2012	Italy	Danilo Di Luca	Acqua & Sapone
2013	Luxembourg	Bob Jungels	RadioShack–Leopard
2014	Italy	Simone Ponzi	Neri Sottoli
2015	Italy	Giacomo Nizzolo	Trek Factory Racing

=== As individual challenge races ===
==== Coppa Papà Carlo ====
Year	Country	Rider	Team
2010	Italy	Gianluca Brambilla	Colnago–CSF Inox
2011	Italy	Simone Ponzi	Liquigas–Cannondale

==== Coppa Città di Stresa ====
Year	Country	Rider	Team
2009	Italy	Marco Pinotti (Note: Held as an invitational race.)	Team Columbia–HTC
2010	Italy	Oscar Gatto	ISD–NERI
2011	Italy	Elia Viviani	Liquigas–Cannondale
