= Simone Ponzi =

Italian cyclist (born 1987)

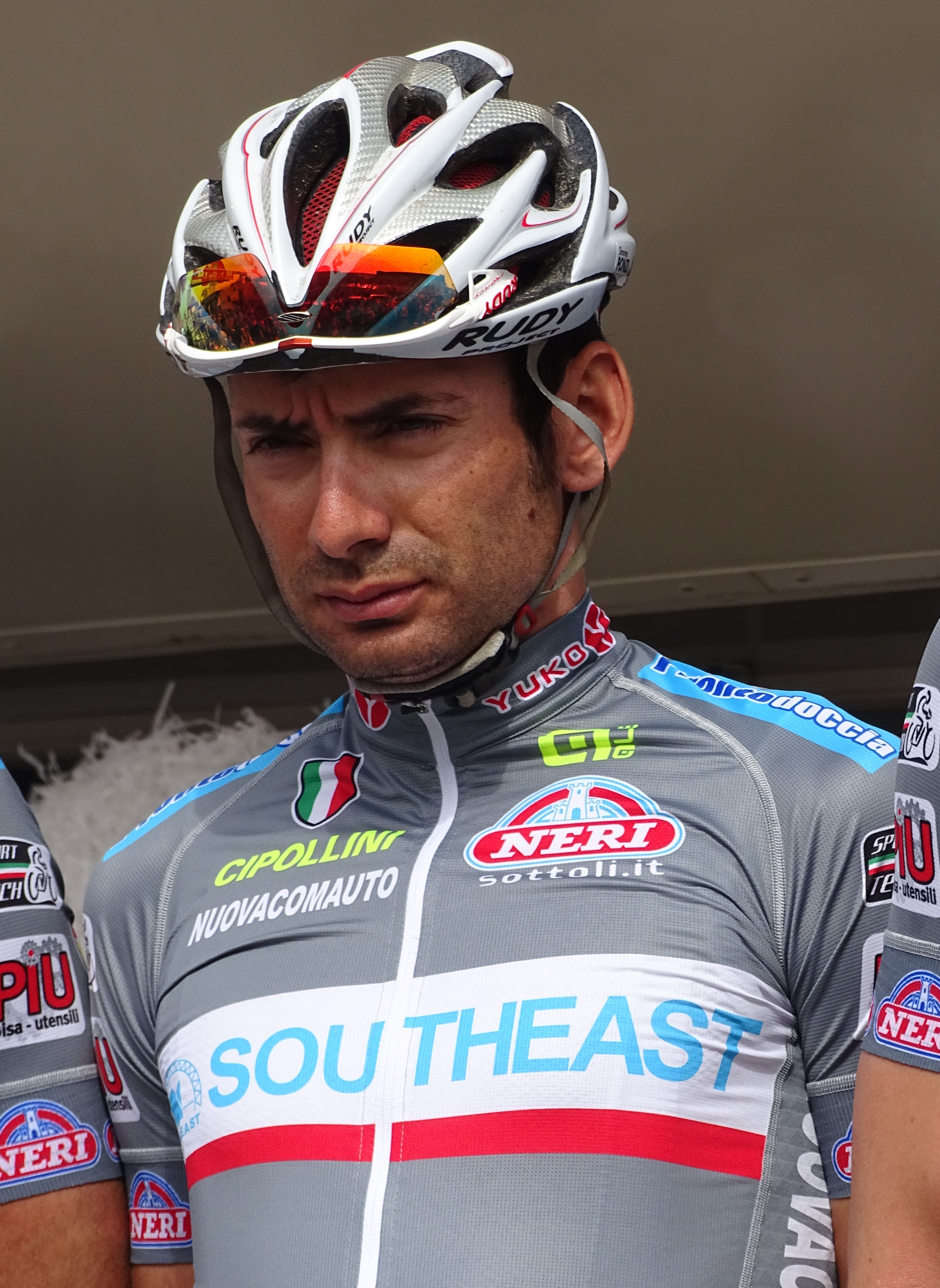
- Ponzi at the 2015 Grand Prix de Denain.

Personal information
- Full name: Simone Ponzi
- Born: 24 October 1986 (age 39) Manerbio, Italy
- Height: 1.76 m (5 ft 9 in)
- Weight: 64 kg (141 lb)

Cycling career
- Sport: Cycling
- Discipline: Road
- Role: Rider

Amateur team
- 2006–2008: Zalf–Désirée–Fior

Professional teams
- 2009–2010: Lampre–NGC
- 2011: Liquigas–Cannondale
- 2012–2013: Astana
- 2014–2015: Yellow Fluo
- 2016–2017: CCC–Sprandi–Polkowice
- 2018: Nippo–Vini Fantini–Europa Ovini

Simone Ponzi (born 17 January 1987 in Manerbio) is an Italian road bicycle racer, who last rode for UCI Professional Continental Team Nippo–Vini Fantini–Europa Ovini. He turned professional in 2009.

Ponzi left Astana at the end of the 2013 season, and joined Yellow Fluo for the 2014 season.

== Major results ==
2006
5th Trofeo Banca Popolare di Vicenza
2007
1st Road race, National Road Championships
1st Trofeo Zsšdi
1st Trofeo Franco Balestra
4th Gran Premio San Giuseppe
7th Gran Premio Palio del Recioto
2008
1st Giro del Casentino
1st Stage 6 Giro della Valle d'Aosta
2nd Road race, UCI Under-23 Road World Championships
5th Trofeo Alcide Degasperi
9th Giro Ciclistico del Cigno
2009
5th Memorial Marco Pantani
10th Rund um die Nürnberger Altstadt
2010
6th Giro della Romagna
9th Gran Premio Città di Misano – Adriatico
2011
1st Gran Premio Nobili Rubinetterie
1st GP Kranj
2nd Trofeo Laigueglia
2nd Coppa Ugo Agostoni
2nd Gran Premio Industria e Commercio Artigianato Carnaghese
2nd Giro della Romagna
3rd Road race, National Road Championships
4th Vattenfall Cyclassics
5th Gran Premio dell'Insubria-Lugano
7th Grand Prix Cycliste de Québec
2012
1st Stage 1 Tour of Slovenia
10th Gran Piemonte
2013
1st Stage 1 Vuelta a Burgos
2nd Coppa Ugo Agostoni
2nd Grand Prix Cycliste de Montréal
3rd Gran Premio Nobili Rubinetterie
5th Roma Maxima
8th Coppa Bernocchi
8th Tre Valli Varesine
2014
1st Gran Premio della Costa Etruschi
1st Dwars door Drenthe
1st Gran Premio Nobili Rubinetterie
3rd Coppa Bernocchi
3rd Coppa Ugo Agostoni
4th Giro dell'Appennino
4th Gran Premio Industria e Commercio di Prato
6th Memorial Marco Pantani
2015
2nd Gran Premio Nobili Rubinetterie
2nd GP Ouest–France
4th Tre Valli Varesine
4th Coppa Sabatini
4th Gran Premio Bruno Beghelli
7th Coppa Ugo Agostoni
9th Trofeo Matteotti
10th Gran Premio Industria e Commercio di Prato
2017
5th Coppa Ugo Agostoni
7th Overall Sibiu Cycling Tour

=== Grand Tour general classification results timeline ===
Grand Tour	2012	2013	2014	2015	2016	2017
Giro d'Italia	88	—	106	—	—	126
Tour de France	Has not contested during career					
Vuelta a España	Has not contested during career					

Legend
—	Did not compete
DNF	Did not finish
