= Francesco Reda =

Italian cyclist (born 1982)

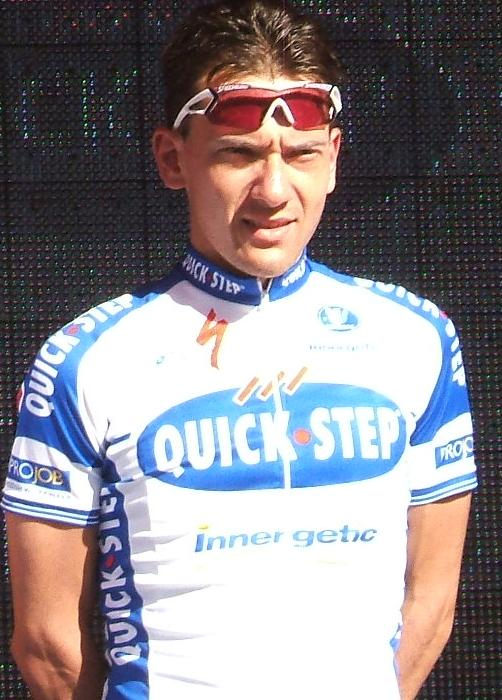
- Reda at the 2009 Tour Down Under

Personal information
- Full name: Francesco Reda
- Born: 19 November 1982 (age 43) Cosenza, Italy

Cycling career
- Sport: Cycling
- Current team: Suspended
- Discipline: Road
- Role: Rider

Professional teams
- 2007–2008: OTC Doors–Lauretana
- 2009–2011: Quick-Step
- 2012: Acqua & Sapone
- 2013: Androni Giocattoli–Venezuela
- 2015: Team Idea 2010 ASD

Francesco Reda (born 19 November 1982) is an Italian professional road bicycle racer, who is currently suspended from the sport, after testing positive for erythropoietin (EPO).

== Doping ==
In 2013, Cosenza-born Reda rode for UCI Professional Continental Team Androni Giocattoli–Venezuela, when he was banned after evading a doping test. His ban was reduced after he gave evidence to the Cycling Independent Reform Commission. On 15 July 2015, it was announced that Reda had tested positive for erythropoietin (EPO) after the Italian National Road Race Championships, which he finished second. In February 2016, Reda was banned for eight years.

== Major results ==
2005
3rd Trofeo Città di Brescia
2006
5th Ruota d'Oro
2007
4th Tour du Haut Var
10th Gran Premio Industria e Commercio Artigianato Carnaghese
2008
2nd Giro della Romagna
2nd Trofeo Matteotti
4th Coppa Ugo Agostoni
5th Overall Giro della Provincia di Reggio Calabria
6th Gran Premio Città di Camaiore
8th Trofeo Melinda
8th Gran Premio Industria e Commercio Artigianato Carnaghese
2009
4th Gran Premio di Lugano
5th Overall Tour de Pologne
5th Overall Tour of Austria
2010
5th Grote Prijs Jef Scherens
9th Grand Prix Cycliste de Québec
2012
3rd Giro dell'Appennino
4th Giro del Veneto
5th Overall Settimana Internazionale di Coppi e Bartali
6th Overall Tour of Belgium
7th Tre Valli Varesine
7th Strade Bianche
8th Gran Premio di Lugano
9th Trofeo Laigueglia
2013
2nd Trofeo Laigueglia
3rd Overall Tour Méditerranéen
~~7th Gran Premio Città di Camaiore~~
~~8th Strade Bianche~~
2015
1st Trofeo Edil C
1st Stage 1 An Post Rás
~~2nd Road race, National Road Championships~~
6th Tour de Berne
8th Overall Istrian Spring Trophy
9th Gran Premio della Costa Etruschi
10th Gran Premio Nobili Rubinetterie

=== Grand Tour general classification results timeline ===
Grand Tour	2009	2010	2011
Giro d'Italia	139	DNF	134
Tour de France	—	DNF	—
Vuelta a España	—	—	—

Legend
—	Did not compete
DNF	Did not finish

== See also ==
- List of doping cases in cycling
