= Nicola Testi =

Italian cyclist

Personal information
- Born: 29 April 1990 (age 36) Castiglion Fiorentino, Italy

Cycling career
- Sport: Cycling
- Discipline: Road
- Role: Rider

Professional team
- 2014: Androni Giocattoli–Venezuela

Nicola Testi (born 29 April 1990) is an Italian cyclist.

== Major results ==
2012
4th Trofeo Edil C
6th Ronde Van Vlaanderen U23
