= Antonino Parrinello =

Italian bicycle racer

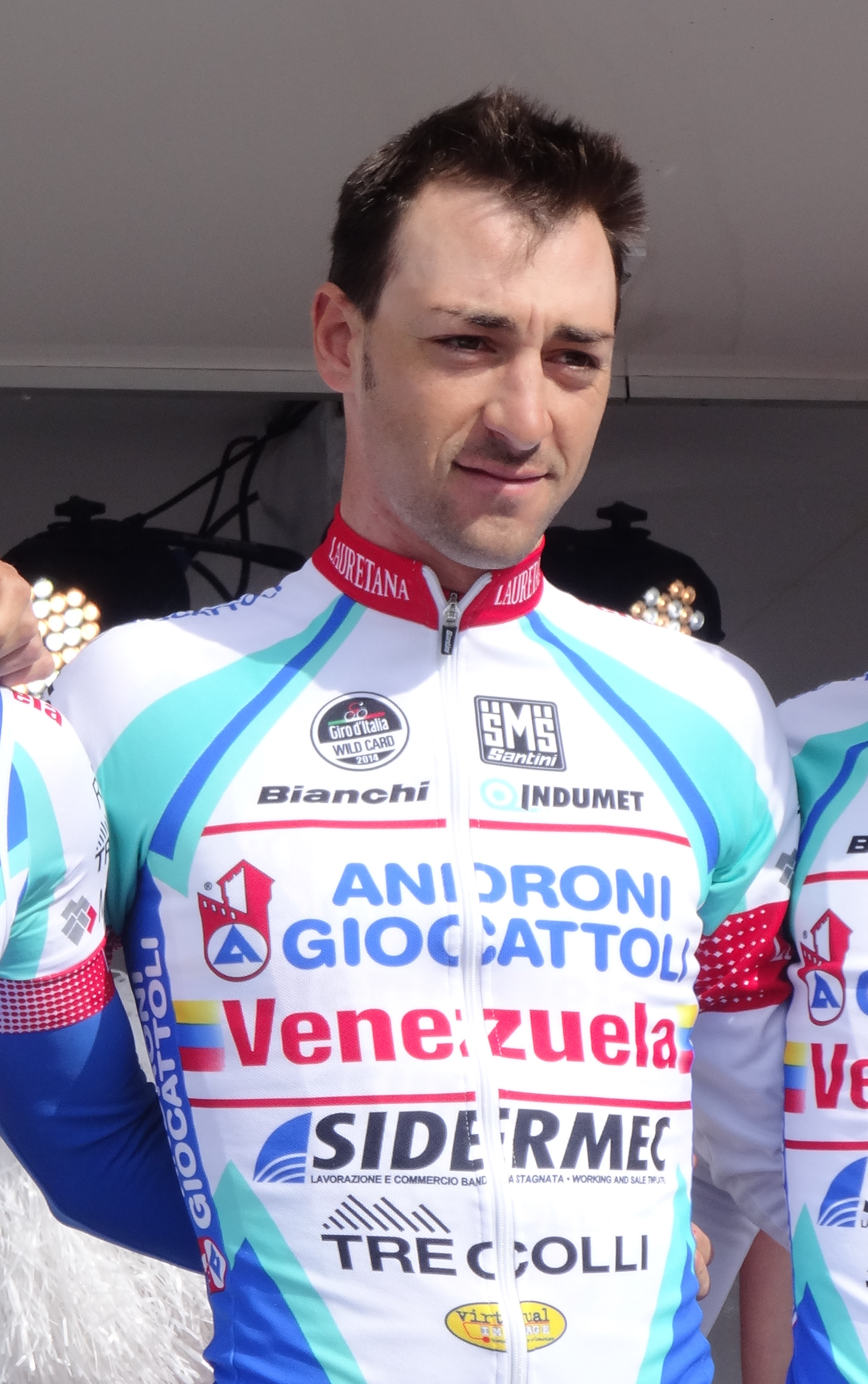
- Parrinello at the 2014 Grand Prix de Denain

Personal information
- Full name: Antonino Casimiro Parrinello
- Born: 2 October 1988 (age 38) Castelvetrano, Italy

Cycling career
- Sport: Cycling
- Discipline: Road
- Role: Rider

Amateur teams
- 2007–2008: Cargo Compass
- 2009–2010: Bedogni–Grassi–Natalini
- 2011: Team Hopplà–Truck Italia–Mavo–Valdarno Project

Professional teams
- 2012–2014: Androni Giocattoli–Venezuela
- 2015–2016: D'Amico–Bottecchia
- 2017: GM Europa Ovini

Antonino Casimiro Parrinello (born 2 October 1988) is an Italian former cyclist, who rode professionally between 2012 and 2017 for the Androni Giocattoli–Venezuela, D'Amico–Bottecchia and GM Europa Ovini teams.

== Major results ==
2009
4th Gran Premio Industrie del Marmo
4th Coppa della Pace
2010
6th Gran Premio della Liberazione
6th Ruota d'Oro
2011
1st Ruota d'Oro
1st GP Pretola
1st Gara Ciclistica Millionaria
1st GP Industria del Cuoio e delle Pelli
2013
5th Grand Prix Impanis-Van Petegem
2014
4th Roma Maxima
5th Gran Premio della Costa Etruschi
5th GP Industria & Artigianato di Larciano
8th Giro dell'Appennino
9th Memorial Marco Pantani
10th Tre Valli Varesine
2015
2nd Tour de Berne
4th Overall Ronde de l'Oise
4th Overall Sibiu Cycling Tour
4th Trofeo Matteotti
9th Gran Premio Nobili Rubinetterie
9th Tre Valli Varesine
10th Coppa Ugo Agostoni
2016
1st Overall Ronde de l'Oise

1st Points classification

1st Coupe des Carpathes
6th Trofeo Matteotti
6th Grand Prix Pino Cerami
2017
1st GP Adria Mobil
7th Trofeo Matteotti
8th Overall Istrian Spring Trophy
9th Overall Sibiu Cycling Tour
9th Overall Ronde de l'Oise
