= Alessio Taliani =

Italian cyclist

Personal information
- Born: 11 October 1990 (age 36) Livorno, Italy
- Height: 1.80 m (5 ft 11 in)
- Weight: 60 kg (132 lb)

Cycling career
- Sport: Cycling
- Current team: Retired
- Discipline: Road
- Role: Rider

Professional team
- 2014–2017: Androni Giocattoli–Venezuela

Alessio Taliani (born 11 October 1990) is an Italian former professional racing cyclist, who rode professionally from 2014 to 2017, entirely for the Androni–Sidermec–Bottecchia team. During his career, Taliani took one professional victory – the third stage at the 2015 Sibiu Cycling Tour.

In 2017, he was suspended until August 2020, having tested positive for triamcinolone acetonide at the 2016 Volta a Portugal.

== Major results ==
2012
9th Giro del Belvedere
2013
1st Coppa della Pace
4th GP Capodarco
2014
7th Overall Sibiu Cycling Tour
2015
5th Overall Sibiu Cycling Tour

1st Stage 3
