= GM Europa Ovini =

Italian cycling team

Team information
- Registered: Italy
- Founded: 2015
- Disbanded: 2017
- Discipline: Road
- Status: UCI Continental

Team name history
- 2015 2016–2017: GM Cycling Team; GM Europa Ovini

GM Europa Ovini was an Italian UCI Continental team founded in 2015. It participated in UCI Continental Circuits races.

The team was disbanded at the end of the 2017 season.

== Team roster ==
Rider	Date of birth
Adriano Brogi (ITA)	20 July 1991 (age 35)
Francesco Canepa (ITA)	30 June 1997 (age 29)
Leonardo Canepa (ITA)	30 June 1997 (age 29)
Piergiorgio Cardarilli (ITA)	23 February 1998 (age 28)
Andrea Di Federico (ITA)	15 February 1995 (age 31)
Antonio Di Sante (ITA)	25 September 1993 (age 32)
Francesco Gabriele (ITA)	29 March 1998 (age 28)
Diego Guglielmetti (ITA)	2 March 1998 (age 28)

Rider	Date of birth
Mirko Iafrati (ITA)	27 April 1998 (age 28)
Sebastian Lander (DNK)	11 March 1991 (age 35)
Rossano Mauti (ITA)	31 May 1997 (age 29)
Davide Pacchiardo (ITA)	30 May 1990 (age 36)
Antonino Parrinello (ITA)	2 October 1988 (age 37)
Matteo Rotondi (ITA)	26 September 1996 (age 29)
Andrea Ruscetta (ITA)	17 January 1990 (age 36)
Marco Tizza (ITA)	6 February 1992 (age 34)

== Major wins ==
2015
Stage 2 Rhône-Alpes Isère Tour, Marco D'Urbano
Stage 1 Okolo Slovenska, Filippo Fortin
2016
GP Adria Mobil, Filippo Fortin
Banja Luka–Belgrade II, Filippo Fortin
Stages 1 & 5 Tour de Serbie, Filippo Fortin
