= D'Amico–UM Tools =

Italian cycling team

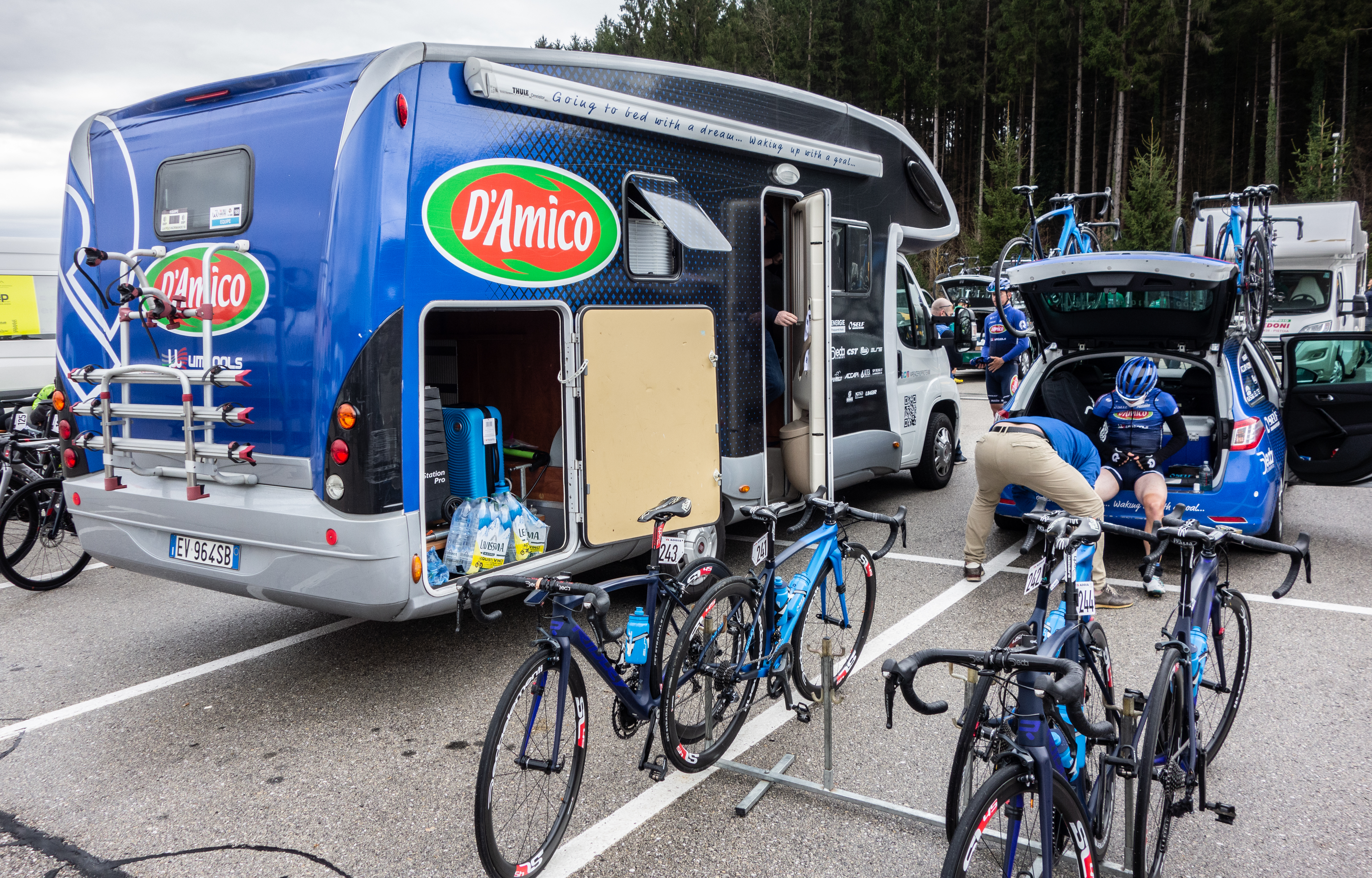
- D'Amico–UM Tools at 2021 GP Adria Mobil

Team information
- UCI code: AZT
- Registered: Italy
- Founded: 2014
- Discipline: Road
- Status: UCI Continental
- Bicycles: 2021 Ridley
- Components: 2021 Shimano

Key personnel
- General manager: Ivan De Paolis
- Team managers: Massimo Codol; Francesco Ghiarè

Team name history
- 2014 2015–2016 2017–2018 2019–: Area Zero Pro Team; D'Amico–Bottecchia; D'Amico Utensilnord; D'Amico–UM Tools

D'Amico–UM Tools is an Italian UCI Continental team founded in 2014, that participates in UCI Continental Circuits races.

== Team roster ==
As of 15 February 2021.

Rider	Date of birth
Antonio Pio Bevilacqua (ITA)	22 May 2002 (age 24)
Maksym Bilyi (UKR)	16 January 2001 (age 25)
Besnik Islami (ITA)	17 September 2002 (age 23)
Daniel Nastasi (ITA)	10 May 1999 (age 27)
Nicolas Nesi (ITA)	13 September 1997 (age 28)
Marco Pavan (ITA)	17 October 2000 (age 25)

Rider	Date of birth
Vojislav Peric (UKR)	8 November 2001 (age 24)
Alessio Riccardi (ITA)	13 July 2001 (age 25)
Luca Roberti (ITA)	6 June 2000 (age 26)
Jeferson Ruíz (COL)	6 July 2002 (age 24)
Daniel Smarzaro (ITA)	9 October 1997 (age 28)
Luca Taschin (ITA)	8 June 1994 (age 32)

== Major wins ==
2014
Grand Prix Südkärnten, Andrea Pasqualon
Stage 7 Vuelta a Colombia, Andrea Pasqualon
2015
Albania Under-23 Road Race Championships, Iltjan Nika
Albania Under-23 Time Trial Championships, Iltjan Nika
2016
Ronde de l'Oise, Antonio Parrinello
Coupe des Carpathes, Antonio Parrinello

== National champions ==
2015
Under-23 Road Race, Iltjan Nika
Under-23 Time Trial, Iltjan Nika
