= 2014 Team Sky season =

Team Sky
- 2014 season
- UCI code: SKY
- Status: UCI WorldTeam
- World Ranking: 9th (890 points)
- Manager: Dave Brailsford
- Main sponsor(s): BSkyB
- Based: United Kingdom
- Bicycles: Pinarello
- Groupset: Shimano

Season victories
- One-day races: 1
- Stage race overall: 6
- Stage race stages: 15
- Most wins: Chris Froome (4 wins)
- Best ranked rider: Chris Froome (7th)

The 2014 season for Team Sky began in January at the Tour Down Under. As a UCI ProTeam, they were automatically invited and obliged to send a squad to every event in the UCI World Tour.

== 2014 roster ==
As of 14 April 2014.

Rider	Date of birth
Edvald Boasson Hagen (NOR)	17 May 1987 (aged 26)
Ian Boswell (USA)	7 February 1991 (aged 22)
Dario Cataldo (ITA)	17 March 1985 (aged 28)
Philip Deignan (IRL)	7 September 1983 (aged 30)
Joe Dombrowski (USA)	12 May 1991 (aged 22)
Nathan Earle (AUS)	4 June 1988 (aged 25)
Josh Edmondson (GBR)	6 July 1992 (aged 21)
Bernhard Eisel (AUT)	17 February 1981 (aged 32)
Chris Froome (GBR)	20 May 1985 (aged 28)
Sebastián Henao (COL)	5 August 1993 (aged 20)
Sergio Henao (COL)	10 December 1987 (aged 26)
Peter Kennaugh (GBR)	15 June 1989 (aged 24)
Vasil Kiryienka (BLR)	28 June 1981 (aged 32)
Christian Knees (GER)	5 March 1981 (aged 32)
David López (ESP)	13 May 1981 (aged 32)

Rider	Date of birth
Mikel Nieve (ESP)	26 May 1984 (aged 29)
Danny Pate (USA)	23 March 1979 (aged 34)
Richie Porte (AUS)	30 January 1985 (aged 28)
Salvatore Puccio (ITA)	31 August 1989 (aged 24)
Gabriel Rasch (Note: Rasch retired from the sport on 13 April, after completing Paris–Roubaix.) (NOR)	8 April 1976 (aged 37)
Luke Rowe (GBR)	10 March 1990 (aged 23)
Kanstantsin Sivtsov (BLR)	9 August 1982 (aged 31)
Ian Stannard (GBR)	25 May 1987 (aged 26)
Chris Sutton (AUS)	10 September 1984 (aged 29)
Ben Swift (GBR)	5 November 1987 (aged 26)
Geraint Thomas (GBR)	25 May 1986 (aged 27)
Jonathan Tiernan-Locke (Note: Tiernan-Locke was sacked by the team on 17 July, following his two-year suspension for biological passport irregularities.) (GBR)	26 December 1984 (aged 29)
Bradley Wiggins (GBR)	28 April 1980 (aged 33)
Xabier Zandio (ESP)	17 March 1977 (aged 36)

Riders who joined the team for the 2014 season

Rider	2013 team
Philip Deignan	UnitedHealthcare
Nathan Earle	Huon Salmon–Genesys Wealth Advisers
Sebastián Henao	Coldeportes–Claro
Mikel Nieve	Euskaltel–Euskadi

Riders who left the team during or after the 2013 season

Rider	2014 team
Mathew Hayman	Orica–GreenEDGE
Rigoberto Urán	Omega Pharma–Quick-Step

== Season victories ==
Date	Race	Competition	Rider	Country	Location
25 January	Tour Down Under, Stage 5	UCI World Tour	Richie Porte (AUS)	Australia	Willunga
22 February	Tour of Oman, Stage 5	UCI Asia Tour	Chris Froome (GBR)	Oman	Jabal al Akhdar
23 February	Tour of Oman, Overall	UCI Asia Tour	Chris Froome (GBR)	Oman	
23 February	Tour of Oman, Teams classification	UCI Asia Tour	(Note: The riders on the squad were Chris Froome, Dario Cataldo, David López, Sergio Henao, Mikel Nieve, Danny Pate, Kanstantsin Sivtsov and Ben Swift)	Oman	
1 March	Omloop Het Nieuwsblad	UCI Europe Tour	Ian Stannard (GBR)	Belgium	Ghent
27 March	Settimana Internazionale di Coppi e Bartali, Stage 1a	UCI Europe Tour	Ben Swift (GBR)	Italy	Gatteo
27 March	Settimana Internazionale di Coppi e Bartali, Stage 1b	UCI Europe Tour	Team time trial (Note: In this team time trial, squads were split into two mini-teams. The winning riders were Dario Cataldo, Vasil Kiryienka, Peter Kennaugh and Ben Swift. Also part of the squad at the event were Joe Dombrowski, Philip Deignan, Ian Boswell and Sebastián Henao)	Italy	Gatteo
28 March	Settimana Internazionale di Coppi e Bartali, Stage 2	UCI Europe Tour	Peter Kennaugh (GBR)	Italy	Sogliano al Rubicone
30 March	Settimana Internazionale di Coppi e Bartali, Stage 4	UCI Europe Tour	Dario Cataldo (ITA)	Italy	Castello di Montecuccolo
30 March	Settimana Internazionale di Coppi e Bartali, Overall	UCI Europe Tour	Peter Kennaugh (GBR)	Italy	
30 March	Settimana Internazionale di Coppi e Bartali, Points classification	UCI Europe Tour	Ben Swift (GBR)	Italy	
30 March	Settimana Internazionale di Coppi e Bartali, Teams classification	UCI Europe Tour	(Note: The riders on the squad were Peter Kennaugh, Dario Cataldo, Vasil Kiryienka, Sebastián Henao, Philip Deignan, Ian Boswell, Joe Dombrowski and Ben Swift)	Italy	
11 April	Tour of the Basque Country, Stage 5	UCI World Tour	Ben Swift (GBR)	Spain	Xemein
4 May	Tour de Romandie, Stage 5	UCI World Tour	Chris Froome (GBR)	Switzerland	Neuchâtel
4 May	Tour de Romandie, Overall	UCI World Tour	Chris Froome (GBR)	Switzerland	
12 May	Tour of California, Stage 2	UCI America Tour	Bradley Wiggins (GBR)	United States	Folsom
18 May	Tour of California, Overall	UCI America Tour	Bradley Wiggins (GBR)	United States	
31 May	Bayern–Rundfahrt, Stage 4	UCI Europe Tour	Geraint Thomas (GBR)	Germany	Wassertrüdingen
1 June	Bayern–Rundfahrt, Overall	UCI Europe Tour	Geraint Thomas (GBR)	Germany	
1 June	Bayern–Rundfahrt, Teams classification	UCI Europe Tour	(Note: The riders on the squad were Peter Kennaugh, Geraint Thomas, Vasil Kiryienka, Christian Knees, Ian Boswell, Joe Dombrowski and Luke Rowe)	Germany	
8 June	Critérium du Dauphiné, Stage 1	UCI World Tour	Chris Froome (GBR)	France	Lyon
9 June	Critérium du Dauphiné, Stage 2	UCI World Tour	Chris Froome (GBR)	France	Pays d'Olliergues–Col du Béal
15 June	Critérium du Dauphiné, Stage 8	UCI World Tour	Mikel Nieve (ESP)	France	Courchevel
15 June	Critérium du Dauphiné, Points classification	UCI World Tour	Chris Froome (GBR)	France	
6 July	Tour of Austria, Stage 1	UCI Europe Tour	Peter Kennaugh (GBR)	Austria	Sonntagberg
13 July	Tour of Austria, Overall	UCI Europe Tour	Peter Kennaugh (GBR)	Austria	
13 July	Tour of Austria, Points classification	UCI Europe Tour	Peter Kennaugh (GBR)	Austria	
14 September	Tour of Britain, Stage 8a	UCI Europe Tour	Bradley Wiggins (GBR)	United Kingdom	London
14 September	Vuelta a España, Super-combativity award	UCI World Tour	Chris Froome (GBR)	Spain	
