= 2014 Settimana Internazionale di Coppi e Bartali =

2014 UCI Europe Tour

Race details
- Dates: 27–30 March 2014
- Stages: 5
- Distance: 447.5 km (278.1 mi)
- Winning time: 10h 30' 40"

Results
Jersey awarded to the overall winner	Winner	Peter Kennaugh (GBR)	(Team Sky)
	Second	Dario Cataldo (ITA)	(Team Sky)
	Third	Matteo Rabottini (ITA)	(Neri Sottoli)
Jersey awarded to the points classification winner	Points	Ben Swift (GBR)	(Team Sky)
Jersey awarded to the mountains classification winner	Mountains	Mirko Tedeschi (ITA)	(Team Idea)
Jersey awarded to the youth classification winner	Youth	Simone Petilli (ITA)	(Area Zero Pro Team)
	Team	Team Sky	

The 2014 Settimana Internazionale di Coppi e Bartali was the 29th edition of the Settimana Internazionale di Coppi e Bartali cycling stage race. It started on 27 March in Gatteo and ended on 30 March in Castello di Montecuccolo.

The race consisted of four stages, with the first one divided into two half-stages; the second half of the first stage was a particular team time trial, with every team split into two teams and final time taken on the fourth rider who crossed the finish line. A similar team time trial was also used in the 2013 edition of the race.

The race was dominated by Team Sky. Team Sky's riders won four stages out of five, won the General Classification (with Peter Kennaugh, with another rider – Dario Cataldo – finishing in the second place), won the Points Classification (Ben Swift), and finished ahead of Teams Classifications. The others minor classifications were the King of Mountains Classification, won by Mirko Tedeschi (Team Idea), and the Young Rider Classification, won by Simone Petilli (Area Zero Pro Team).

== Race overview ==
Stage	Date	Course	Distance	Type	Winner	Ref
1a	27 March	Gatteo to Gatteo	102 km (63.4 mi)	Hilly stage	Ben Swift (GBR)	
1b	27 March	Gatteo Mare to Gatteo	13.3 km (8.3 mi)	Team time trial	Team Sky A	
2	28 March	Sant'Angelo to Sogliano al Rubicone	163.8 km (101.8 mi)	Intermediate stage	Peter Kennaugh (GBR)	
3	29 March	Crevalcore to Crevalcore	158.4 km (98.4 mi)	Flat stage	Elia Viviani (ITA)	
4	30 March	Pavullo to Castello di Montecuccolo	10 km (6.2 mi)	Individual time trial	Dario Cataldo (ITA)	
Total		447.5 km (278.1 mi)				

== Teams ==
The start list includes 25 teams (3 ProTeams, 9 Professional Continental Teams and 13 Continental Teams).

Pro Teams:

- Cannondale
- Lampre–Merida
- Team Sky

Professional Continental Teams:

- UnitedHealthcare
- Bardiani–CSF
- Neri Sottoli
- Androni Giocattoli–Venezuela
- RusVelo
- Team Novo Nordisk
- MTN–Qhubeka
- Topsport Vlaanderen–Baloise
- Colombia

Continental Teams:

- Christina Watches–Dana
- Itera–Katusha
- Vini Fantini–Nippo
- Amore & Vita–Selle SMP
- ASC Dukla Praha
- Team Idea
- Marchiol–Emisfero
- Area Zero Pro Team
- Meridiana–Kamen
- Utensilnord
- Adria Mobil
- MG Kvis–Trevigiani
- Vega–Hotsand

== Stages ==
=== Stage 1a ===
27 March 2014 — Gatteo to Gatteo, 102 km (63.4 mi)

Stage 1a Result

	Rider	Team	Time
1	Ben Swift (GBR)	Team Sky	2h 22' 31"
2	Manuele Mori (ITA)	Lampre–Merida	s.t.
3	Damiano Caruso (ITA)	Cannondale	s.t.
4	Thomas Sprengers (BEL)	Topsport Vlaanderen–Baloise	s.t.
5	Alberto Cecchin (ITA)	Marchiol–Emisfero	s.t.
6	Andrea Pasqualon (ITA)	Area Zero Pro Team	s.t.
7	Enrico Barbin (ITA)	Bardiani–CSF	s.t.
8	Peter Kennaugh (GBR)	Team Sky	s.t.
9	Fabio Taborre (ITA)	Neri Sottoli	s.t.
10	Matteo Busato (ITA)	MG Kvis–Trevigiani	s.t.

General Classification after Stage 1a

	Rider	Team	Time
1	Ben Swift (GBR)	Team Sky	2h 22' 25"
2	Manuele Mori (ITA)	Lampre–Merida	+ 2"
3	Damiano Caruso (ITA)	Cannondale	+ 4"
4	Thomas Sprengers (BEL)	Topsport Vlaanderen–Baloise	+ 6"
5	Alberto Cecchin (ITA)	Marchiol–Emisfero	+ 6"
6	Andrea Pasqualon (ITA)	Area Zero Pro Team	+ 6"
7	Enrico Barbin (ITA)	Bardiani–CSF	+ 6"
8	Peter Kennaugh (GBR)	Team Sky	+ 6"
9	Fabio Taborre (ITA)	Neri Sottoli	+ 6"
10	Matteo Busato (ITA)	MG Kvis–Trevigiani	+ 6"

=== Stage 1b ===
27 March 2014 — Gatteo a Mare to Gatteo, 13.3 km (8.3 mi) team time trial (TTT)

Stage 1b Result

	Team	Time
1	Team Sky A	15' 30"
2	RusVelo B	+ 15"
3	Cannondale B	+ 18"
4	Neri Sottoli A	+ 18"
5	Neri Sottoli B	+ 21"
6	Cannondale A	+ 22"
7	Topsport Vlaanderen–Baloise A	+ 23"
8	RusVelo A	+ 24"
9	Topsport Vlaanderen–Baloise B	+ 26"
10	Adria Mobil B	+ 26"

General Classification after Stage 1b

	Rider	Team	Time
1	Ben Swift (GBR)	Team Sky	2h 37' 55"
2	Peter Kennaugh (GBR)	Team Sky	+ 6"
3	Dario Cataldo (ITA)	Team Sky	+ 6"
4	Vasil Kiryienka (BLR)	Team Sky	+ 6"
5	Sergey Pomoshnikov (RUS)	RusVelo	+ 21"
6	Sergey Lagutin (RUS)	RusVelo	+ 21"
7	Fabio Taborre (ITA)	Neri Sottoli	+ 24"
8	Damiano Caruso (ITA)	Cannondale	+ 26"
9	Mauro Finetto (ITA)	Neri Sottoli	+ 27"
10	Matteo Rabottini (ITA)	Neri Sottoli	+ 27"

=== Stage 2 ===
28 March 2014 — Sant'Angelo di Gatteo to Sogliano al Rubicone, 163.8 km (101.8 mi)

Stage 2 Result

	Rider	Team	Time
1	Peter Kennaugh (GBR)	Team Sky	4h 20' 14"
2	Francesco Manuel Bongiorno (ITA)	Bardiani–CSF	+ 2"
3	Matteo Rabottini (ITA)	Neri Sottoli	+ 48"
4	Dario Cataldo (ITA)	Team Sky	+ 50"
5	Jarlinson Pantano (COL)	Colombia	+ 52"
6	Franco Pellizotti (ITA)	Androni Giocattoli–Venezuela	+ 53"
7	Davide Mucelli (ITA)	Meridiana–Kamen	+ 53"
8	Damiano Caruso (ITA)	Cannondale	+ 54"
9	Diego Rosa (ITA)	Androni Giocattoli–Venezuela	+ 54"
10	Sergey Firsanov (RUS)	RusVelo	+ 54"

General Classification after Stage 2

	Rider	Team	Time
1	Peter Kennaugh (GBR)	Team Sky	6h 58' 05"
2	Francesco Manuel Bongiorno (ITA)	Bardiani–CSF	+ 42"
3	Dario Cataldo (ITA)	Team Sky	+ 1' 00"
4	Matteo Rabottini (ITA)	Neri Sottoli	+ 1' 15"
5	Damiano Caruso (ITA)	Cannondale	+ 1' 24"
6	Sergey Firsanov (RUS)	RusVelo	+ 1' 28"
7	Franco Pellizotti (ITA)	Androni Giocattoli–Venezuela	+ 1' 30"
8	Rafael Valls (ESP)	Lampre–Merida	+ 1' 42"
9	Jarlinson Pantano (COL)	Colombia	+ 1' 46"
10	Diego Rosa (ITA)	Androni Giocattoli–Venezuela	+ 2' 24"

=== Stage 3 ===
29 March 2014 — Crevalcore to Crevalcore, 158.4 km (98.4 mi)

Stage 3 Result

	Rider	Team	Time
1	Elia Viviani (ITA)	Cannondale	3h 15' 19"
2	Ben Swift (GBR)	Team Sky	s.t.
3	Rino Gasparrini (ITA)	MG Kvis–Trevigiani	s.t.
4	Luca Wackermann (ITA)	Lampre–Merida	s.t.
5	Manuel Belletti (ITA)	Androni Giocattoli–Venezuela	s.t.
6	Eduard-Michael Grosu (ROM)	Vini Fantini–Nippo	s.t.
7	Liam Bertazzo (ITA)	MG Kvis–Trevigiani	s.t.
8	Andrea Pasqualon (ITA)	Area Zero Pro Team	s.t.
9	Mattia Gavazzi (ITA)	Christina Watches–Dana	s.t.
10	Michael Van Staeyen (BEL)	Topsport Vlaanderen–Baloise	s.t.

General Classification after Stage 3

	Rider	Team	Time
1	Peter Kennaugh (GBR)	Team Sky	10h 13' 24"
2	Francesco Manuel Bongiorno (ITA)	Bardiani–CSF	+ 42"
3	Dario Cataldo (ITA)	Team Sky	+ 1' 00"
4	Matteo Rabottini (ITA)	Neri Sottoli	+ 1' 15"
5	Damiano Caruso (ITA)	Cannondale	+ 1' 24"
6	Sergey Firsanov (RUS)	RusVelo	+ 1' 28"
7	Franco Pellizotti (ITA)	Androni Giocattoli–Venezuela	+ 1' 30"
8	Rafael Valls (ESP)	Lampre–Merida	+ 1' 42"
9	Jarlinson Pantano (COL)	Colombia	+ 1' 46"
10	Diego Rosa (ITA)	Androni Giocattoli–Venezuela	+ 2' 24"

=== Stage 4 ===
30 March 2014 — Pavullo to Castello di Montecuccolo, 10 km (6.2 mi), individual time trial (ITT)

Stage 4 Result

	Rider	Team	Time
1	Dario Cataldo (ITA)	Team Sky	16' 28"
2	Matteo Rabottini (ITA)	Neri Sottoli	+ 8"
3	Diego Rosa (ITA)	Androni Giocattoli–Venezuela	+ 12"
4	Damiano Caruso (ITA)	Cannondale	+ 14"
5	Alexander Foliforov (RUS)	Itera–Katusha	+ 18"
6	Franco Pellizotti (ITA)	Androni Giocattoli–Venezuela	+ 24"
7	Alessandro Mazzi (ITA)	Utensilnord	+ 29"
8	Rafael Valls (ESP)	Lampre–Merida	+ 30"
9	Daniel Teklehaymanot (ERI)	MTN–Qhubeka	+ 32"
10	Merhawi Kudus (ERI)	MTN–Qhubeka	+ 36"

Final General Classification

	Rider	Team	Time
1	Peter Kennaugh (GBR)	Team Sky	10h 30' 40"
2	Dario Cataldo (ITA)	Team Sky	+ 12"
3	Matteo Rabottini (ITA)	Neri Sottoli	+ 35"
4	Francesco Manuel Bongiorno (ITA)	Bardiani–CSF	+ 43"
5	Damiano Caruso (ITA)	Cannondale	+ 50"
6	Franco Pellizotti (ITA)	Androni Giocattoli–Venezuela	+ 1' 06"
7	Sergey Firsanov (RUS)	RusVelo	+ 1' 20"
8	Rafael Valls (ESP)	Lampre–Merida	+ 1' 24"
9	Jarlinson Pantano (COL)	Colombia	+ 1' 45"
10	Diego Rosa (ITA)	Androni Giocattoli–Venezuela	+ 1' 48"

== Classification leadership table ==
Stage	Winner	General classification	Points classification	Mountains classification	Young rider classification	Teams classification
1a	Ben Swift	Ben Swift	Ben Swift	Mirko Tedeschi	Davide Villella	Team Sky
1b	Team Sky	Ben Swift	Ben Swift	Mirko Tedeschi	Davide Villella	Team Sky
2	Peter Kennaugh	Peter Kennaugh	Peter Kennaugh	Emanuel Kišerlovski	Simone Petilli	Team Sky
3	Elia Viviani	Peter Kennaugh	Ben Swift	Mirko Tedeschi	Simone Petilli	Team Sky
4	Dario Cataldo	Peter Kennaugh	Ben Swift	Mirko Tedeschi	Simone Petilli	Team Sky
Final		Peter Kennaugh	Ben Swift	Mirko Tedeschi	Simone Petilli	Team Sky
