= Mirko Tedeschi =

Mirko Tedeschi is the name of two Italian cyclists:

- Mirko Tedeschi (cyclist, born 1987)
- Mirko Tedeschi (cyclist, born 1989)
