= Castello Malatestiano, Longiano =

Coordinates: 44.0725°N 12.3249°E

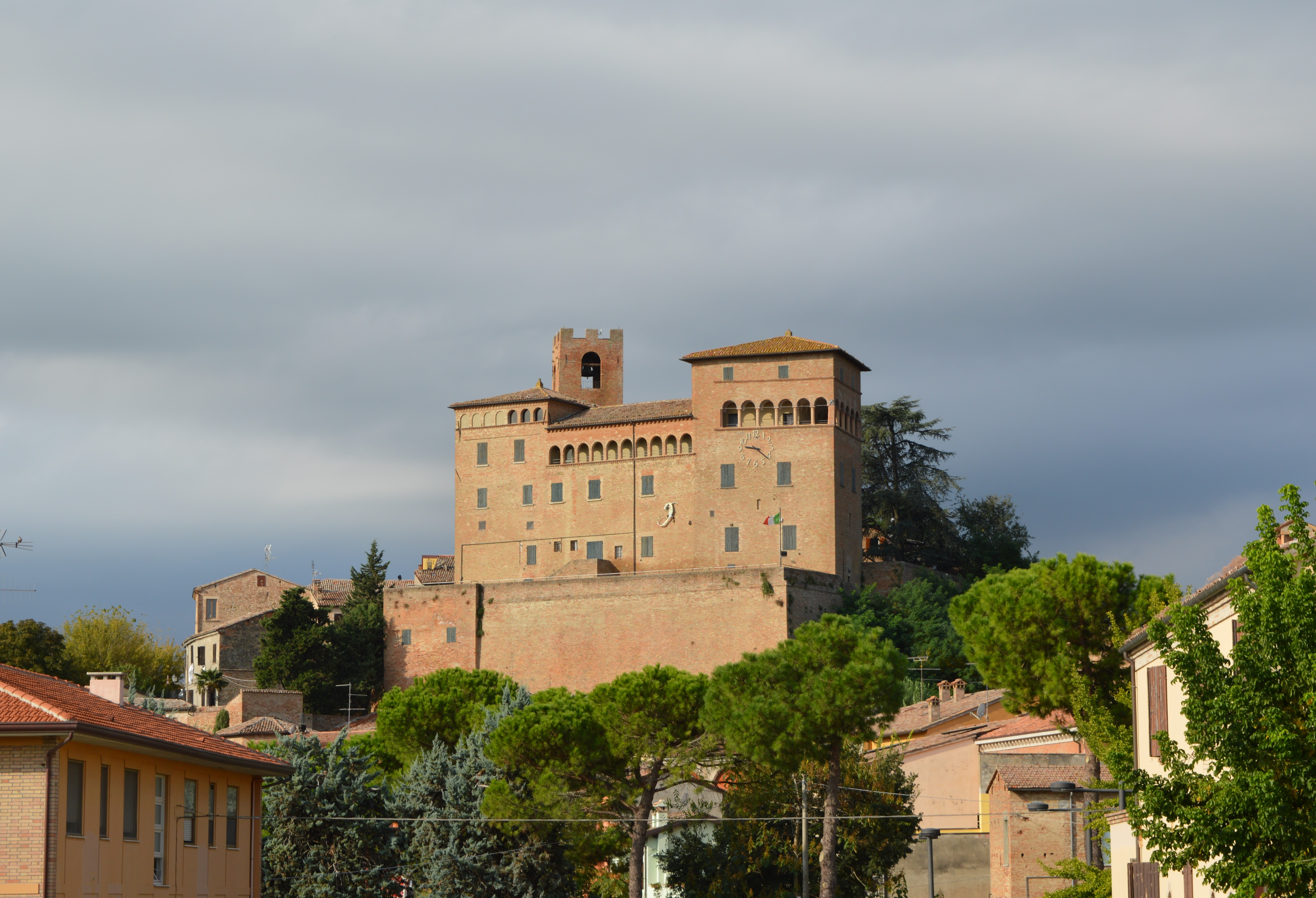
Castle see from the town

The Castello Malatestiano or Rocca Malatestiana of the town of Longiano is a hill-top castle in the center of this town in the province of Forlì-Cesena in the region of Emilia-Romagna, Italy.

== History ==
A castle of the site was erected around the 7th to 8th centuries. It is documented as present by 1059. From 1290 to 1463, the castle was one of the residences of the Malatesta family, who were lords of Rimini. In 1519, the castle was granted to the Count Guido Rangoni of Modena, by Pope Leo X. The count restructured the palace and commissioned frescoes for the interior. In the 19th century, various rooms were refurbished including the Sala dell'Arengo, decorated by the painters Giovanni Canepa and Girolamo Bellani, with persons from the history of Longiano. The castle has belonged to the commune since 1989, and now serves as home of the Fondazione Tito Balestra, and its collections of contemporary and modern art.

== Collections of the Fonazione Balestra ==
In addition to sponsoring new exhibitions, the foundation has a collection first started by Balestra, including works by Balestra himself, Mafai, Rosai, De Pisis, Sironi, Guttuso, Morandi, Vespignani, Zancanaro, Chagall, Goya, Kokoschka, Matisse, Twombly, and Mino Maccari. Subsequent additions include works by Assadour, Enrico Accatino, Enrico Baj, Amerigo Bartoli, Antonio Battistini, Arnaldo Battistoni, Remo Brindisi, Romolo Calciati, Felice Casorati, Leonardo Castellani, Arnoldo Ciarrocchi, Tano Citeroni, Enotrio, Pericle Fazzini, Ilario Fioravanti, Lino Gentili, Franco Gentilini, Giulio Giulianelli, Aldo Gobbi, Giampiero Guerri, Pietro Guida, Tom Lyons, Mauro Masi, Fausto Melotti, Giovanni Sesto Menghi, Elio Morri, Giordano Perrelli, Walter Piacesi, Franco Poli, Domeni Rea, Nino Ricci, Giorgio Amelio Roccamonte, Lalla Romano, Raimondo Rossi, Manlio Sarra, Angelo Savelli, Flaminia Siciliano, Leonardo Sinisgalli, Piergiorgio Spallacci, Alberto Sughi, Nino Tirinnanzi, Antonio Vangelli, and Tono Zancanato.
