= Menghi =

Menghi is a surname. Notable people with the surname include:

- Diego Menghi (born 1985), Argentine footballer
- Fabio Menghi (born 1986), Italian motorcycle racer
- Giovanni Sesto Menghi (1907–1990), Italian painter
- Omar Menghi (born 1975), Italian motorcycle racer
- Roger Menghi (born 1935), Luxembourgian fencer
