= Bitnje, Bohinj =

Bitnje
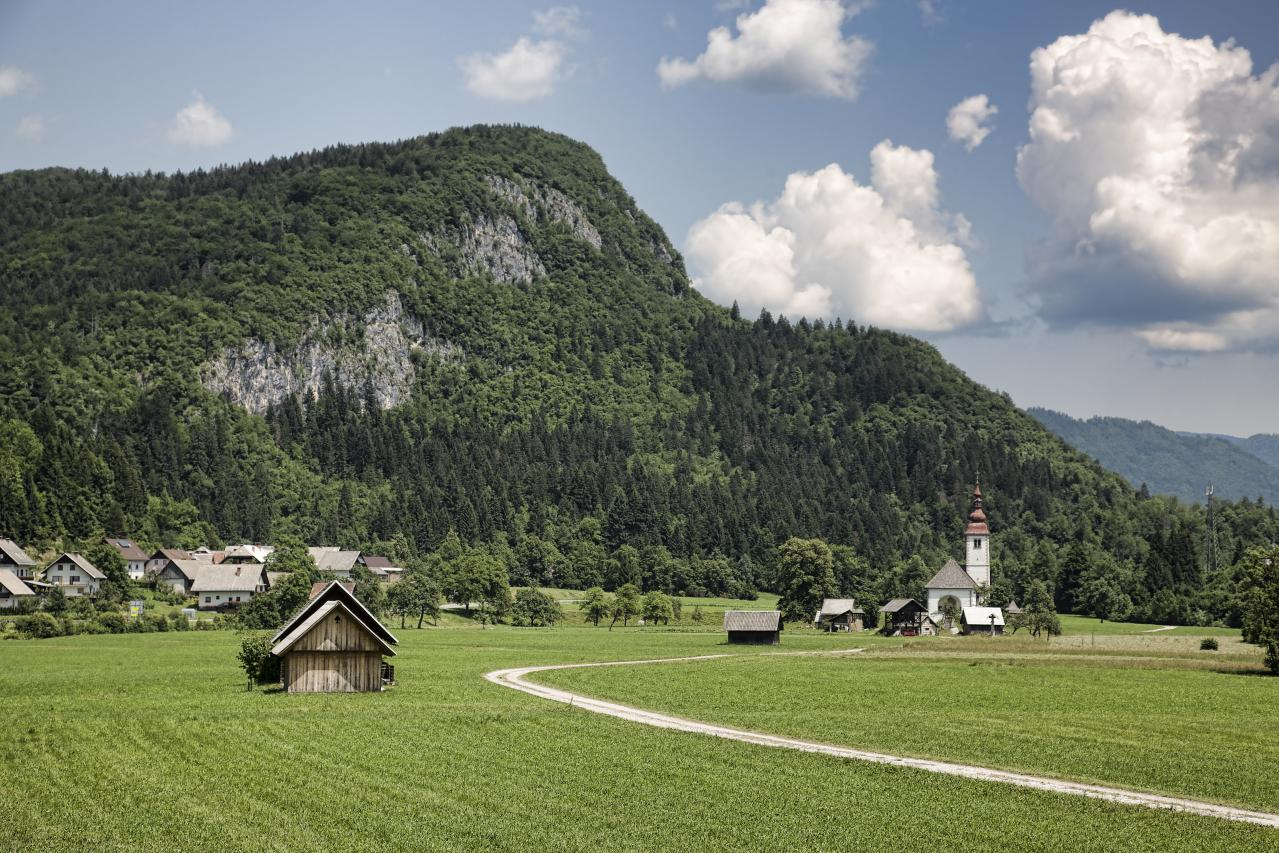

- Location in Slovenia
- Coordinates: 46°17′1.48″N 13°57′36.48″E
- Country: Slovenia
- Traditional region: Upper Carniola
- Statistical region: Upper Carniola
- Municipality: Bohinj
- Elevation: 510.8 m (1,676 ft)

Population (2020)
  - Total: 71

Bitnje (pronounced [ˈbiːtnjɛ], German: Wittnach) is a settlement on the left bank of the Sava Bohinjka River in the Municipality of Bohinj in the Upper Carniola region of Slovenia.

== Name ==
Bitnje was attested in written sources as Pitenach in 1185, Witniach c. 1330, and Bittnach in 1494, among other spellings. The name is derived from the personal name Bytъ, which is also the basis of the name Bitnje near Kranj as well as related place names such as Bitiče.

== Church ==
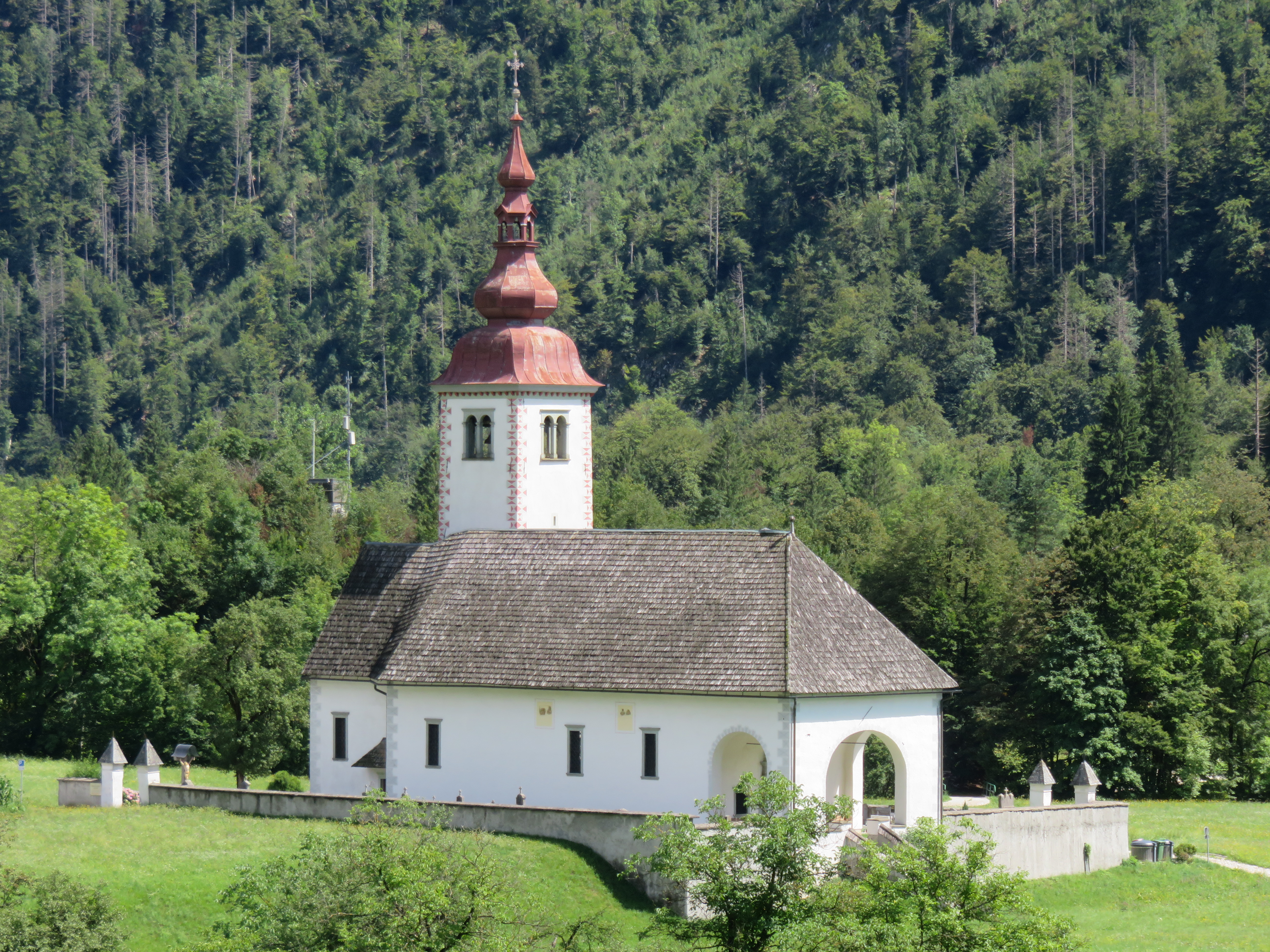
Assumption Church

The originally Gothic medieval village church that has been redesigned in the Baroque style is dedicated to the Assumption of the Virgin Mary. It features a beautiful Renaissance portal.
