= 2014 Tour of Slovenia =

2014 UCI Europe Tour (2.1 race)
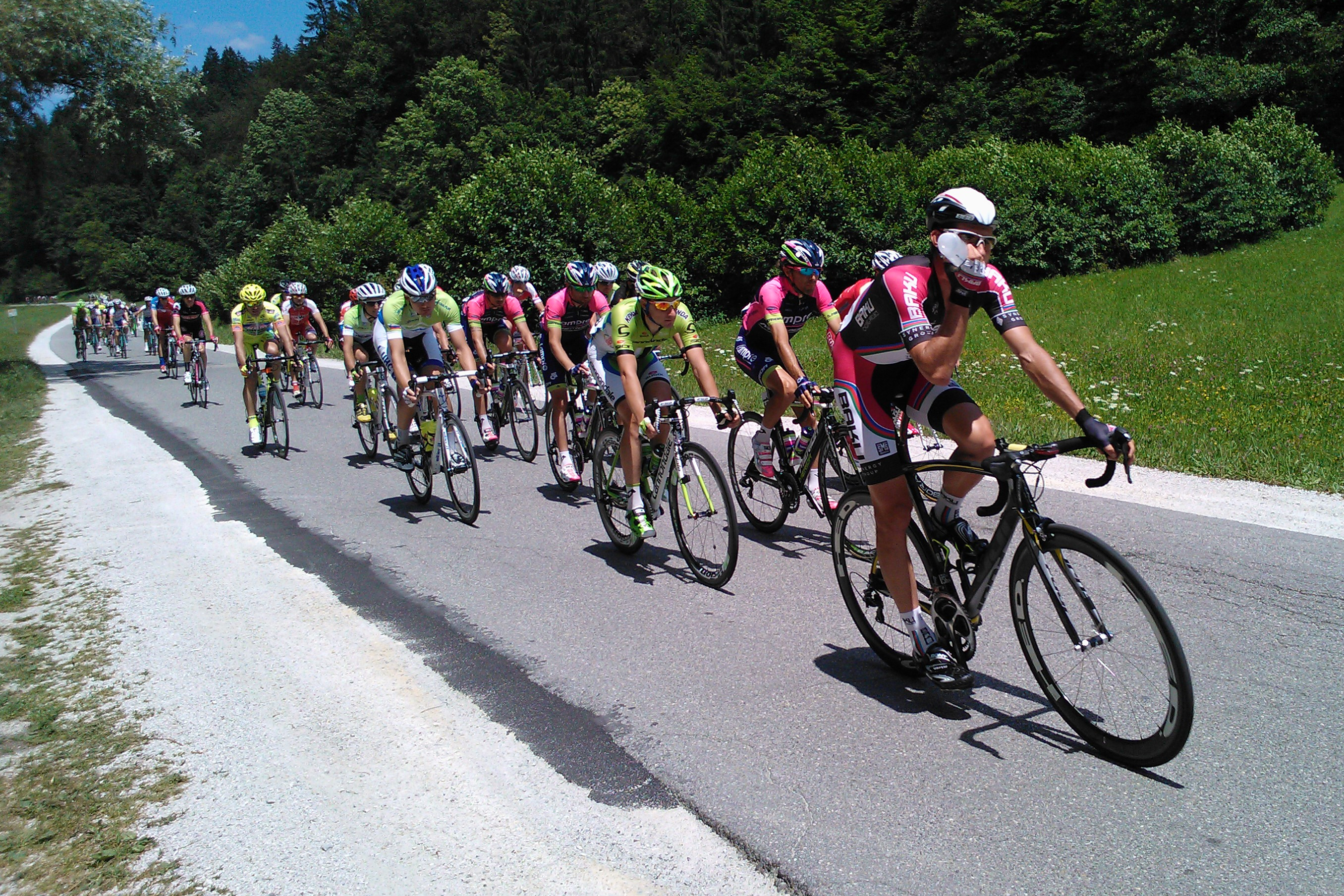
- Stage 4 near Spodnji Hotič

Race details
- Dates: 19–22 June 2014
- Stages: 4
- Distance: 514.5 km (319.7 mi)
- Winning time: 12h 44' 58"

Results
Jersey awarded to the overall winner	Winner	(Portugal) Tiago Machado	(NetApp–Endura)
	Second	(Russia) Ilnur Zakarin	(RusVelo)
	Third	(Italy) Matteo Rabottini	(Neri Sottoli)
Jersey awarded to the points classification winner	Points	(Australia) Michael Matthews	(Orica–GreenEDGE)
Jersey awarded to the mountains classification winner	Mountains	(Slovenia) Klemen Štimulak	(Adria Mobil)
Jersey awarded to the youth classification winner	Youth	(United Kingdom) Simon Yates	(Orica–GreenEDGE)
	Team	(Italy) Bardiani–CSF	

The 2014 Tour of Slovenia (Slovene: Dirka po Sloveniji) was the 21st edition of the Tour of Slovenia, categorized as 2.1 stage race (UCI Europe Tour) held between 19 and 22 June 2014.

Points classification which changed many colors over the years, introduced the red jersey.

The race consisted of 4 stages with 514.5 km (319.7 mi) in total.

== Teams ==
Total 139 riders (126 finished it) from 18 teams started the race.

=== UCI ProTeams ===
- (Italy) Lampre–Merida
- (Russia) Team Katusha
- (Australia) Orica–GreenEDGE
- (Italy) Neri Sottoli
- (Italy) Cannondale

=== UCI Professional Continental ===
- (Italy) Androni Giocattoli–Venezuela
- (Italy) Bardiani–CSF
- (Italy) Colombia
- (Belgium) Topsport Vlaanderen–Baloise
- (Russia) RusVelo
- (Germany) NetApp–Endura

=== UCI Continental ===
- (Slovenia) Adria Mobil
- (Slovenia) Radenska
- (Croatia) Meridiana–Kamen
- (Azerbaijan) Synergy Baku
- (Italy) Area Zero Pro Team
- (Japan) Vini Fantini–Nippo

=== National ===
- Slovenia

== Route and stages ==
Stage characteristics and winners
Stage	Date	Course	Distance	Type	Winner
1	19 June	Ljubljana – Ljubljana	8.8 km (5 mi)	Individual time trial	(Australia) Michael Matthews
2	20 June	Ribnica – Kočevje	160.7 km (100 mi)	Intermediate stage	(Italy) Sonny Colbrelli
3	21 June	Rogaška Slatina - Trije kralji	192 km (119 mi)	Mountain stage	(Italy) Francesco Manuel Bongiorno
4	22 June	Škofja Loka – Novo mesto	153 km (95 mi)	Flat stage	(Italy) Elia Viviani
Total		514.5 km (319.7 mi)			

=== Stage 1 ===
19 June 2014 — Ljubljana, 8.8 km (5.5 mi), individual time trial (ITT)

Rank	Rider	Team	Time
Official results
1	(Australia) Michael Matthews	Orica–GreenEDGE	10' 05"
2	(Slovenia) Kristijan Koren	Cannondale	+ 6"
3	(Italy) Diego Ulissi	Lampre–Merida	+ 10"
4	(Portugal) Tiago Machado	NetApp–Endura	+ 11"
5	(Australia) Brett Lancaster	Orica–GreenEDGE	+ 14"
6	(Russia) Pavel Brutt	Team Katusha	+ 15"
7	(Russia) Artem Ovechkin	RusVelo	+ 16"
8	(Italy) Matteo Rabottini	Neri Sottoli	+ 16"
9	(Italy) Andrea Fedi	Neri Sottoli	+ 18"
10	(Italy) Damiano Caruso	Cannondale	+ 20"

=== Stage 2 ===
20 June 2014 — Ribnica to Kočevje, 160.7 km (99.9 mi)

Rank	Rider	Team	Time
Official results
1	(Italy) Sonny Colbrelli	Bardiani–CSF	4h 01' 09"
2	(Australia) Michael Matthews	Orica–GreenEDGE	+ 0"
3	(Slovenia) Grega Bole	Vini Fantini–Nippo	+ 0"
4	(Italy) Damiano Caruso	Cannondale	+ 0"
5	(Italy) Manuele Mori	Lampre–Merida	+ 0"
6	(Italy) Enrico Battaglin	Bardiani–CSF	+ 0"
7	(Colombia) Jarlinson Pantano	Colombia	+ 0"
8	(Italy) Davide Villella	Cannondale	+ 0"
9	(Russia) Pavel Kochetkov	Team Katusha	+ 0"
10	(Germany) Paul Voss	NetApp–Endura	+ 0"
General classification after the stage
1	(Australia) Michael Matthews	Orica–GreenEDGE	4h 11' 14"
2	(Slovenia) Kristijan Koren	Cannondale	+ 6"
3	(Italy) Diego Ulissi	Lampre–Merida	+ 10"
4	(Portugal) Tiago Machado	NetApp–Endura	+ 11"
5	(Russia) Artem Ovechkin	RusVelo	+ 16"
6	(Italy) Matteo Rabottini	Neri Sottoli	+ 16"
7	(Italy) Damiano Caruso	Cannondale	+ 20"
8	(Germany) Paul Voss	NetApp–Endura	+ 21"
9	(Italy) Mauro Finetto	Neri Sottoli	+ 21"
10	(Spain) David de la Cruz	NetApp–Endura	+ 22"

=== Stage 3 ===
21 June 2014 — Rogaška Slatina to Trije kralji, 192 km (119.3 mi)

Rank	Rider	Team	Time
Official results
1	(Italy) Francesco Manuel Bongiorno	Bardiani–CSF	5h 09' 17"
2	(Portugal) Tiago Machado	NetApp–Endura	+ 1"
3	(Russia) Ilnur Zakarin	RusVelo	+ 7"
4	(Italy) Matteo Rabottini	Neri Sottoli	+ 29"
5	(United Kingdom) Simon Yates	Orica–GreenEDGE	+ 41"
6	(Italy) Emanuele Sella	Androni Giocattoli–Venezuela	+ 41"
7	(Slovenia) Kristijan Koren	Cannondale	+ 41"
8	(Italy) Damiano Caruso	Cannondale	+ 44"
9	(Italy) Angelo Pagani	Bardiani–CSF	+ 44"
10	(Belgium) Eliot Lietaer	Topsport Vlaanderen–Baloise	+ 56"
General classification after the stage
1	(Portugal) Tiago Machado	NetApp–Endura	9h 20' 43"
2	(Russia) Ilnur Zakarin	RusVelo	+ 23"
3	(Italy) Matteo Rabottini	Neri Sottoli	+ 33"
4	(Slovenia) Kristijan Koren	Cannondale	+ 35"
5	(Italy) Francesco Manuel Bongiorno	Bardiani–CSF	+ 37"
6	(Italy) Damiano Caruso	Cannondale	+ 52"
7	(United Kingdom) Simon Yates	Orica–GreenEDGE	+ 55"
8	(Belgium) Eliot Lietaer	Topsport Vlaanderen–Baloise	+ 1' 10"
9	(Slovenia) Jure Golčer	Slovenia (national team)	+ 1' 27"
10	(Russia) Artem Ovechkin	RusVelo	+ 1' 37"

=== Stage 4 ===
22 June 2014 — Škofja Loka to Novo mesto, 153 km (95.1 mi)

Rank	Rider	Team	Time
Official results
1	(Italy) Elia Viviani	Cannondale	3h 24' 15"
2	(Romania) Eduard-Michael Grosu	Vini Fantini–Nippo	+ 0"
3	(Australia) Michael Matthews	Orica–GreenEDGE	+ 0"
4	(Slovenia) Borut Božič	Slovenia (national team)	+ 0"
5	(Belgium) Tom Van Asbroeck	Topsport Vlaanderen–Baloise	+ 0"
6	(Slovenia) Blaž Jarc	NetApp–Endura	+ 0"
7	(Italy) Niccolò Bonifazio	Lampre–Merida	+ 0"
8	(Russia) Vyacheslav Kuznetsov	Team Katusha	+ 0"
9	(Italy) Andrea Fedi	Neri Sottoli	+ 0"
10	(Italy) Damiano Caruso	Cannondale	+ 0"

== Classification leadership ==
Classification leadership by stage
Stage	Winner	General classification	Points classification	Mountains classification	Young rider classification	Team classification
1	Michael Matthews	Michael Matthews	Michael Matthews	not awarded	Simon Yates	Orica–GreenEDGE
2	Sonny Colbrelli	Michael Matthews	Michael Matthews	Davide Villella	Simon Yates	NetApp–Endura
3	Francesco Manuel Bongiorno	Tiago Machado	Michael Matthews	Francesco Manuel Bongiorno	Simon Yates	Bardiani–CSF
4	Elia Viviani	Tiago Machado	Michael Matthews	Klemen Štimulak	Simon Yates	Bardiani–CSF
Final		Tiago Machado	Michael Matthews	Klemen Štimulak	Simon Yates	Bardiani–CSF

== Final classification standings ==
Legend
Yellow jersey	Denotes the winner of the General classification	White jersey	Denotes the winner of the Young rider classification
Red jersey	Denotes the winner of the Points classification	Blue jersey	Denotes the winner of the Mountains classification

=== General classification ===
Rank	Rider	Team	Time
1	(Portugal) Tiago Machado	NetApp–Endura	12h 44' 58"
2	(Russia) Ilnur Zakarin	RusVelo	+ 23"
3	(Italy) Matteo Rabottini	Neri Sottoli	+ 33"
4	(Slovenia) Kristijan Koren	Cannondale	+ 35"
5	(Italy) Francesco Manuel Bongiorno	Bardiani–CSF	+ 37"
6	(Italy) Damiano Caruso	Cannondale	+ 52"
7	(United Kingdom) Simon Yates	Orica–GreenEDGE	+ 55"
8	(Belgium) Eliot Lietaer	Topsport Vlaanderen–Baloise	+ 1' 10"
9	(Slovenia) Jure Golčer	Slovenia (national team)	+ 1' 27"
10	(Russia) Artem Ovechkin	RusVelo	+ 1' 37"

=== Points classification ===
Rank	Rider	Team	Points
1	(Australia) Michael Matthews	Orica–GreenEDGE	61
2	(Portugal) Tiago Machado	NetApp–Endura	34
3	(Italy) Damiano Caruso	Cannondale	34
4	(Italy) Andrea Fedi	Neri Sottoli	34
5	(Slovenia) Kristijan Koren	Cannondale	32
6	(Italy) Elia Viviani	Cannondale	25
7	(Italy) Sonny Colbrelli	Bardiani–CSF	25
8	(Italy) Francesco Manuel Bongiorno	Bardiani–CSF	25
9	(Italy) Matteo Rabottini	Neri Sottoli	22
10	(Russia) Pavel Kochetkov	Team Katusha	21

=== Mountains classification ===
Rank	Rider	Team	Points
1	(Slovenia) Klemen Štimulak	Adria Mobil	18
2	(Italy) Francesco Manuel Bongiorno	Bardiani–CSF	12
3	(Portugal) Tiago Machado	NetApp–Endura	12
4	(Russia) Ilnur Zakarin	RusVelo	12
5	(Colombia) Robinson Chalapud	Colombia	8
6	(Italy) Alessandro Malaguti	Vini Fantini–Nippo	6
7	(Russia) Pavel Brutt	Team Katusha	4
8	(Italy) Matteo Rabottini	Neri Sottoli	4
9	(Italy) Emanuele Sella	Androni Giocattoli–Venezuela	3
10	(Slovenia) Primož Roglič	Adria Mobil	2

=== Young rider classification ===
Rank	Rider	Team	Time
1	(United Kingdom) Simon Yates	Orica–GreenEDGE	12h 45' 53"
2	(Italy) Simone Petilli	Area Zero Pro Team	+ 2' 42"
3	(Slovenia) Jan Polanc	Lampre–Merida	+ 10' 05"
4	(Slovenia) Luka Pibernik	Radenska	+ 11' 00"
5	(Slovenia) Domen Novak	Adria Mobil	+ 11' 16"
6	(Slovenia) Luka Kovačič	Slovenia (national team)	+ 21' 51"
7	(Slovenia) Matej Mohorič	Cannondale	+ 24' 15"
8	(Sweden) Kim Anton Magnusson	Vini Fantini–Nippo	+ 24' 19"
9	(Italy) Stefano Tonin	Area Zero Pro Team	+ 25' 18"
10	(Italy) Marco Tecchio	Area Zero Pro Team	+ 25' 21"

=== Team classification ===
Rank	Team	Time
1	(Italy) Bardiani–CSF	38h 18' 09"
2	(Russia) RusVelo	+ 1' 45"
3	(Germany) NetApp–Endura	+ 3' 44"
4	(Italy) Neri Sottoli	+ 7' 46"
5	(Italy) Cannondale	+ 8' 40"
6	(Italy) Lampre–Merida	+ 15' 37"
7	(Slovenia) Adria Mobil	+ 18' 50"
8	(Belgium) Topsport Vlaanderen–Baloise	+ 19' 36"
9	(Italy) Androni Giocattoli–Venezuela	+ 25' 01"
10	Colombia	+ 27' 17"
