= 2013 Settimana Internazionale di Coppi e Bartali =

2013 UCI Europe Tour

Race details
- Dates: 20–24 March 2013
- Stages: 6
- Distance: 556.7 km (345.9 mi)
- Winning time: 14h 15' 12"

Results
Jersey awarded to the overall winner	Winner	Diego Ulissi (ITA)	(Lampre–Merida)
	Second	Damiano Cunego (ITA)	(Lampre–Merida)
	Third	Miguel Ángel Rubiano (COL)	(Androni Giocattoli–Venezuela)
Jersey awarded to the points classification winner	Points	Damiano Cunego (ITA)	(Lampre–Merida)
Jersey awarded to the mountains classification winner	Mountains	Alessandro Mazzi (ITA)	(Utensilnord Ora24.eu)
Jersey awarded to the youth classification winner	Youth	Francesco Manuel Bongiorno (ITA)	(Bardiani Valvole–CSF Inox)
	Team	Androni Giocattoli–Venezuela	

The 2013 Settimana Internazionale di Coppi e Bartali was the 28th edition of the Settimana Internazionale di Coppi e Bartali cycling stage race. It started on 20 March in Gatteo and ended on 24 March in Fiorano Modenese.

The race was officially presented on 12 March 2013 in Sant'Angelo di Gatteo. It consisted of four full stages and two half-stages; the first stage, second half-stage (Stage 1b) was a particular team time trial in which each team was split into two separate mini-teams, with the final time taken on the third rider who crossed the finish line. This original time trial was won by Team Katusha.

The race was won by Lampre–Merida's Italian rider Diego Ulissi, who took the leader's red jersey by winning the second stage. His teammate Damiano Cunego was second in the General classification, was the winner of the Points classification, as well as the third stage. Colombian rider Miguel Ángel Rubiano (Androni Giocattoli–Venezuela) completed the podium. Alessandro Mazzi of Utensilnord Ora24.eu won the King of the Mountains classification, and Francesco Manuel Bongiorno (Bardiani Valvole–CSF Inox) won the Young rider classification. Androni Giocattoli–Venezuela was first in the Teams classification.

== Teams ==
25 teams were invited to take part in the race, including the ProTeams Lampre–Merida, Cannondale, Astana and Team Katusha. The 25 teams were:

Pro Teams

- Astana
- Cannondale
- Lampre–Merida
- Team Katusha

Professional Continental Teams

- NetApp–Endura
- Bardiani Valvole–CSF Inox
- Vini Fantini–Selle Italia
- Androni Giocattoli–Venezuela
- RusVelo
- Team Novo Nordisk
- Accent Jobs–Wanty
- CCC–Polsat–Polkowice
- UnitedHealthcare
- MTN–Qhubeka
- Topsport Vlaanderen–Baloise
- Colombia

Continental Teams

- Utensilnord Ora24.eu
- Adria Mobil
- Ceramica Flaminia–Fondriest
- Amore & Vita
- ASC Dukla Praha
- Gourmetfein–Simplon
- Team Øster Hus–Ridley
- Team Vorarlberg
- Lokosphinx

== Race overview ==
Stage	Date	Course	Distance	Type	Winner
1a	20 March	Gatteo to Gatteo	100.5 km (62.4 mi)	Flat stage	Fabio Felline (ITA)
1b	20 March	Sant'Angelo to Gatteo Mare	11.2 km (7.0 mi)	Team time trial	Team Katusha
2	21 March	Gatteo to Sogliano al Rubicone	162.3 km (100.8 mi)	Intermediate stage	Diego Ulissi (ITA)
3	22 March	Zola Predosa to Piane di Mocogno	157 km (97.6 mi)	Mountain stage	Damiano Cunego (ITA)
4	23 March	Crevalcore to Crevalcore	14.3 km (8.9 mi)	Individual time trial	Adriano Malori (ITA)
5	24 March	Monticelli Terme to Fiorano Modenese	111.4 km (69.2 mi)	Intermediate stage	Damiano Caruso (ITA)
Total		556.7 km (345.9 mi)			

== Classification leadership table ==
Stage	Winner	General Classification	Points Classification	Mountains Classification	Young Riders Classification	Team Classification
1a	Fabio Felline	Fabio Felline	Fabio Felline	Alessandro Mazzi	Fabio Felline	Androni Giocattoli–Venezuela
1b	Team Katusha	Maxim Belkov	Fabio Felline	Alessandro Mazzi	Sergey Chernetskiy	Team Katusha
2	Diego Ulissi	Diego Ulissi	Diego Ulissi	Alessandro Mazzi	Francesco Manuel Bongiorno	Lampre–Merida
3	Damiano Cunego	Diego Ulissi	Damiano Cunego	Alessandro Mazzi	Francesco Manuel Bongiorno	Lampre–Merida
4	Adriano Malori	Diego Ulissi	Damiano Cunego	Alessandro Mazzi	Francesco Manuel Bongiorno	Androni Giocattoli–Venezuela
5	Damiano Caruso	Diego Ulissi	Damiano Cunego	Alessandro Mazzi	Francesco Manuel Bongiorno	Androni Giocattoli–Venezuela
Final		Diego Ulissi	Damiano Cunego	Alessandro Mazzi	Francesco Manuel Bongiorno	Androni Giocattoli–Venezuela

== Final standings ==
=== General classification ===
	Rider	Team	Time
1	Diego Ulissi (ITA)	Lampre–Merida	14h 15' 12"
2	Damiano Cunego (ITA)	Lampre–Merida	+ 1' 35"
3	Miguel Ángel Rubiano (COL)	Androni Giocattoli–Venezuela	+ 1' 48"
4	Ivan Basso (ITA)	Cannondale	+ 1' 59"
5	Riccardo Zoidl (AUT)	Gourmetfein–Simplon	+ 2' 09"
6	Leopold König (CZE)	NetApp–Endura	+ 2' 14"
7	Francesco Bongiorno (ITA)	Bardiani Valvole–CSF Inox	+ 2' 36"
8	Davide Rebellin (ITA)	CCC–Polsat–Polkowice	+ 2' 41"
9	Sergio Pardilla (ESP)	MTN–Qhubeka	+ 3' 11"
10	Fabio Taborre (ITA)	Vini Fantini–Selle Italia	+ 3' 19"

=== Points classification ===
	Rider	Team	Points
1	Damiano Cunego (ITA)	Lampre–Merida	16
2	Miguel Ángel Rubiano (COL)	Androni Giocattoli–Venezuela	11
3	Diego Ulissi (ITA)	Lampre–Merida	10

=== King of the Mountains classification ===
	Rider	Team	Points
1	Alessandro Mazzi (ITA)	Utensilnord Ora24.eu	27
2	Damiano Caruso (ITA)	Cannondale	16
3	Fabio Felline (ITA)	Androni Giocattoli–Venezuela	12

=== Young rider classification ===
	Rider	Team	Time
1	Francesco Manuel Bongiorno (ITA)	Bardiani Valvole–CSF Inox	14h 17' 48"
2	Lukas Pöstlberger (AUT)	Gourmetfein–Simplon	+ 3' 37"
3	Fabio Felline (ITA)	Androni Giocattoli–Venezuela	+ 3' 59"

=== Teams classification ===
	Team	Time
1	Androni Giocattoli–Venezuela	42h 38' 14"
2	NetApp–Endura	+ 6' 07"
3	Bardiani Valvole–CSF Inox	+ 7' 24"
