= 2013 Tre Valli Varesine =

Tre Valli Varesine
2013 UCI Europe Tour

Race details
- Dates: August 23
- Stages: 1
- Distance: 199.35 km (123.9 mi)
- Winning time: 5 hr 01 min 21 sec

Results
| | Winner | Kristijan Đurasek (Croatia) | (Lampre–Merida) |
| | Second | Francesco Bongiorno (Italy) | (Bardiani Valvole–CSF Inox) |
| | Third | Alexandr Kolobnev (Russia) | (Team Katusha) |

The 2013 Tre Valli Varesine was the 93rd edition of the Tre Valli Varesine single-day cycling race. It was held on 23 August 2013, over a distance of 199.5 km. The race started with a circuit in Varese, passed through the three "varesine valley" (Valganna, Valcuvia and Valtravaglia) and another circuit in Luino, and ended in Campione d'Italia on the Lago di Lugano.

The race was won by Kristijan Đurasek (Lampre-Merida), who out-sprinted Bardiani Valvole–CSF Inox's Francesco Bongiorno on the final hill, whereas Alexandr Kolobnev of Team Katusha was third. The race was decided on the final climb: when Bongiorno attacked with two kilometers to go, only Đurasek could follow the young Italian rider. The two managed to keep themselves few seconds ahead of Kolobnev, who was chasing them alone, and the Croatian rider won the two-men sprint to get his first victory for Lampre-Merida.

== Teams ==
15 teams and more than 100 riders took part to the race. Pre-race favourites were Damiano Cunego, Enrico Gasparotto, Fabio Aru, Pierre Rolland, Alexandr Kolobnev and Davide Rebellin.

UCI ProTeams
- Astana
- Lampre–Merida
- Team Katusha
UCI Professional Continental Teams
- Vini Fantini–Selle Italia
- Androni Giocattoli–Venezuela
- Bardiani Valvole–CSF Inox
- Colombia
- Sojasun
- CCC–Polsat–Polkowice
- MTN–Qhubeka
- Topsport Vlaanderen–Baloise
- Team Europcar
- RusVelo
- Champion System
UCI Continental Teams
- Ceramica Flaminia–Fondriest

== Results ==
| | Cyclist | Team | Time |
|---|---|---|---|
| 1 | Kristijan Đurasek (CRO) | Lampre–Merida | 5h 01' 21" |
| 2 | Francesco Bongiorno (ITA) | Bardiani Valvole–CSF Inox | + 2" |
| 3 | Alexandr Kolobnev (RUS) | Team Katusha | + 7" |
| 4 | Ivan Rovny (RUS) | Ceramica Flaminia–Fondriest | + 9" |
| 5 | Davide Rebellin (ITA) | CCC–Polsat–Polkowice | + 9" |
| 6 | Franco Pellizotti (ITA) | Androni Giocattoli–Venezuela | + 10" |
| 7 | Fabio Aru (ITA) | Astana | + 10" |
| 8 | Simone Ponzi (ITA) | Astana | + 11" |
| 9 | Matteo Rabottini (ITA) | Vini Fantini–Selle Italia | + 11" |
| 10 | Sergey Firsanov (RUS) | RusVelo | + 13" |
