= Giovanni Sesto Menghi =

Italian painter

Giovanni Sesto Menghi (1907–1990) was an Italian painter known for depiction of still-life subjects and portraits.

== Biography ==
He was born in Rimini to a family originally from Longiano. He studied in Bologna under Guido Federico Lucchini, a portrait painter. Gaining a stipend from Rimini, between 1935 and 1939, he studied initially in Rome and Florence, and made a first career as a manuscript illuminator. He then began painting oil canvases in an impressionist style. He was in the army but refused to fight for the fascist army, and joined partisan forces in Longiano and Gambettola. He returned to live and work as a painter in Rimini.

In the late 1930s, he met Filippo de Pisis who influenced him. He won some awards in Bergamo and Rome in 1942 and early 1943.
