= Bitiče =

- Location in Slovenia
- Coordinates: 46°5′57.09″N 14°49′12.31″E
- Country: Slovenia
- Traditional region: Upper Carniola
- Statistical region: Central Sava
- Municipality: Litija

Area
  - Total: 1.31 km^{2} (0.51 sq mi)
- Elevation: 450.6 m (1,478 ft)

Population (2002)
  - Total: 19
- Postal code: 1270

Bitiče (pronounced [ˈbiːtitʃɛ]; German: Vititsch) is a small settlement in the Municipality of Litija in central Slovenia. It lies in the hills just north of Spodnji Hotič. The area is part of the traditional region of Upper Carniola. It is now included with the rest of the municipality in the Central Sava Statistical Region; until January 2014 the municipality was part of the Central Slovenia Statistical Region.

== Name ==
Bitiče was attested in written sources as Vitis in 1145, Witeczgeschies in 1406, and Wittitsch in 1444, among other spellings.
