= Francesco Manuel Bongiorno =

Italian cyclist

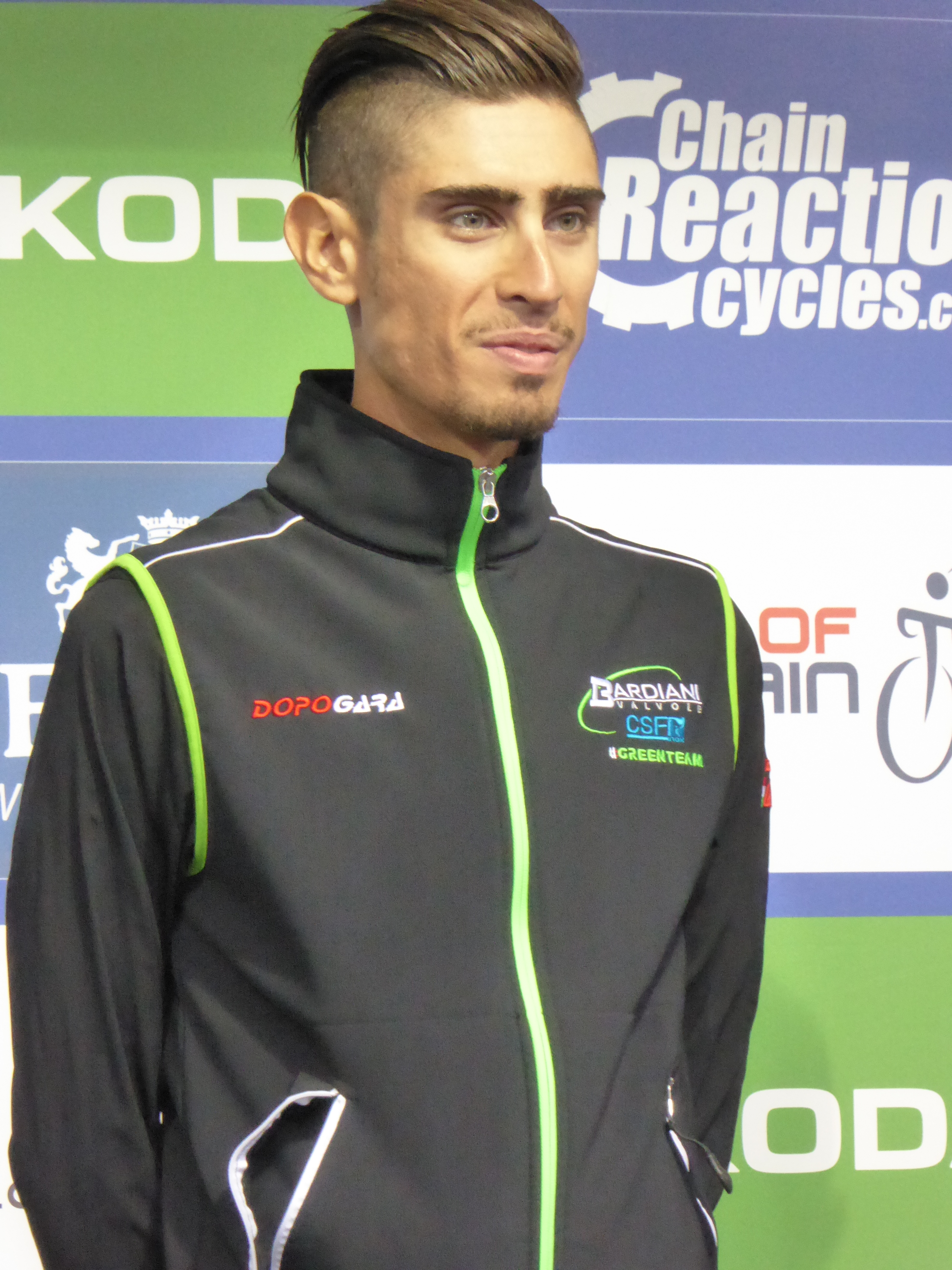
- Bongiorno at the 2016 Tour of Britain

Personal information
- Full name: Francesco Manuel Bongiorno
- Born: 1 September 1990 (age 36) Reggio Calabria, Italy
- Height: 1.72 m (5 ft 8 in)
- Weight: 56 kg (123 lb)

Cycling career
- Sport: Cycling
- Current team: Global 6 United
- Discipline: Road
- Role: Rider

Amateur teams
- 2009–2010: Futura Team–Matricardi
- 2011: Zalf–Désirée–Fior
- 2012: Simaf Carrier Wega Truck Italia Valdarno

Professional teams
- 2013–2016: Bardiani Valvole–CSF Inox
- 2017: Sangemini–MG.K Vis
- 2019–2020: Neri Sottoli–Selle Italia–KTM
- 2021–: Global 6 Cycling

Francesco Manuel Bongiorno (born 1 September 1990) is an Italian racing cyclist, who currently rides for UCI Continental team Global 6 United.

== Major results ==
2008
6th Overall Giro della Lunigiana

1st Stage 3

2009
10th GP Folignano
2010
1st Ruota d'Oro
2nd Giro del Casentino
3rd Overall Giro della Valle d'Aosta
6th Giro del Belvedere
2011
7th Trofeo Gianfranco Bianchin
10th Overall Girobio
2012
1st Road race, National Under-23 Road Championships
1st Gran Premio Palio del Recioto
3rd Overall Toscana Coppa delle Nazioni

1st Stage 3

4th Trofeo Città di San Vendemiano
5th Overall Giro del Friuli-Venezia Giulia
6th Trofeo Banca Popolare di Vicenza
9th Overall Giro della Valle d'Aosta
2013
2nd Tre Valli Varesine
3rd Overall Settimana Ciclistica Lombarda

1st Young rider classification

5th Overall Danmark Rundt
5th Giro dell'Emilia
7th Overall Settimana Internazionale di Coppi e Bartali

1st Young rider classification

8th GP Industria & Artigianato di Larciano
2014
3rd GP Industria & Artigianato di Larciano
4th Overall Settimana Internazionale di Coppi e Bartali
5th Overall Tour of Slovenia

1st Stage 3

5th Giro dell'Emilia
7th Overall Tour du Limousin

1st Young rider classification

10th Overall Tour Méditerranéen
2015
4th Overall Settimana Internazionale di Coppi e Bartali
6th Giro dell'Appennino
2017
1st Overall Tour of Albania

1st Stage 4

4th GP Adria Mobil
7th Gran Premio di Lugano
2019
8th Overall Tour of Almaty
2020
10th Overall Tour de Langkawi

=== Grand Tour general classification results timeline ===
Grand Tour	2013	2014	2015	2016
Giro d'Italia	71	59	60	109
Tour de France	—	—	—	—
Vuelta a España	—	—	—	—

Legend
—	Did not compete
DNF	Did not finish
