= Matteo Rabottini =

Italian racing cyclist

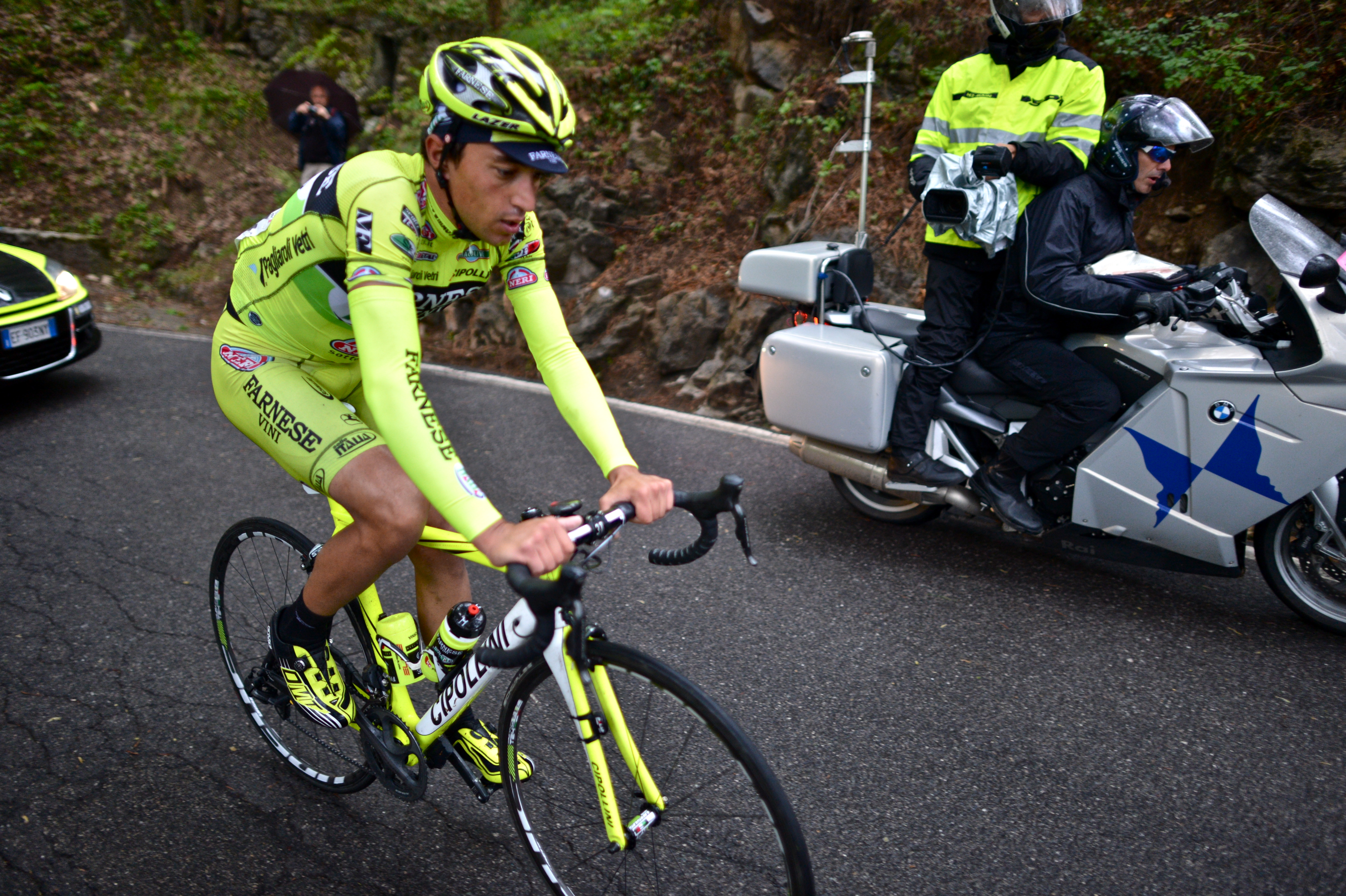
- Rabottini at the 2012 Giro d'Italia

Personal information
- Full name: Matteo Rabottini
- Nickname: Rambo
- Born: 14 August 1987 (age 39) Pescara, Italy

Cycling career
- Sport: Cycling
- Discipline: Road
- Role: Climber

Amateur team
- 2006–2010: Aran Cucine

Professional teams
- 2010: → Lampre–Farnese Vini (stagiaire)
- 2011–2014: Farnese Vini–Neri Sottoli
- 2016–2022: Meridiana–Kamen

Major wins
- Grand Tours Giro d'Italia Mountains classification (2012) 1 individual stage (2012)

Matteo Rabottini (born 14 August 1987) is an Italian racing cyclist, who last for UCI Continental team Meridiana–Kamen.

== Career ==
He was provisionally suspended by the UCI in September 2014 following an adverse analytical finding for EPO in a test taken in August 2014. He was dropped from the Italian World Championships team. In May 2015 UCI announced on their website that Rabottini was banned for two years, with a cut of 3 months for "Substantial Assistance in Discovering or Establishing Anti-Doping Rule Violations". The ban ended on 6 May 2016. He joined Meridiana–Kamen upon the conclusion of the ban.

== Major results ==
2009
1st Road race, National Under-23 Road Championships
2010
10th Overall Girobio

1st Stage 10

2011 (1 pro win)
1st Stage 5 Tour of Turkey
2012 (1)
Giro d'Italia

1st Mountains classification
1st Stage 15

3rd Coppa Sabatini
3rd Gran Premio Bruno Beghelli
5th Overall Tour of Slovenia
6th Giro dell'Emilia
7th Overall Giro di Padania
10th GP Industria & Artigianato di Larciano
2013
9th Tre Valli Varesine
9th Milano–Torino
2014
3rd Road race, National Road Championships
3rd Overall Settimana Internazionale di Coppi e Bartali
3rd Overall Tour of Slovenia
~~4th Overall Vuelta a Burgos~~
4th Gran Premio della Costa Etruschi
9th Trofeo Laigueglia
2017
6th Overall Tour of Albania
2018
5th Overall Tour of Albania

=== Grand Tour general classification results timeline ===
Grand Tour	2011	2012	2013	2014
Giro d'Italia	113	60	55	17
Tour de France	Did not contest during his career			
Vuelta a España	Did not contest during his career			

Legend
—	Did not compete
DNF	Did not finish
