= Mirko Tedeschi (cyclist, born 1989) =

Italian bicycle racer

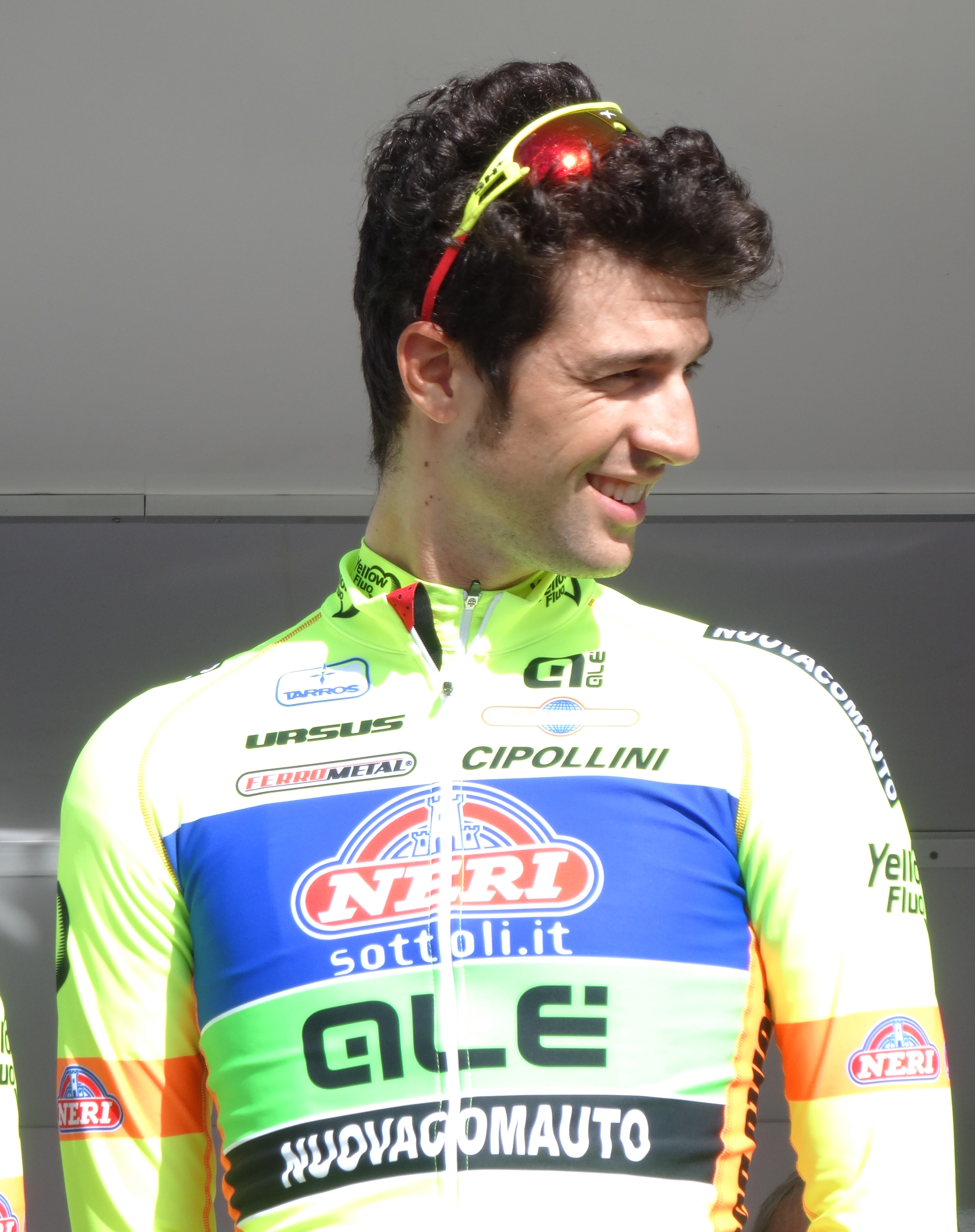
- Tedeschi in 2014

Personal information
- Full name: Mirko Tedeschi
- Born: 5 January 1989 (age 37) Negrar, Italy

Cycling career
- Sport: Cycling
- Disciplines: Road; Track
- Role: Rider

Amateur teams
- 2008: Lucchini Neri Comauto Cocif
- 2009: Neri Sottoli Nuova Comauto Promociclo
- 2010: Casati NGC Perrel
- 2011–2012: Petroli Firenze
- 2013: Malmantile–Romano Gaini–Taccetti

Professional teams
- 2011: Farnese Vini–Neri Sottoli (stagiaire)
- 2014–2016: Yellow Fluo

Mirko Tedeschi (born 5 January 1989 in Negrar) is an Italian former professional cyclist, who competed professionally for Wilier Triestina–Southeast between 2014 and 2016.

== Major results ==
2007
1st Team pursuit, National Track Championships (with Elia Viviani, Filippo Fortin and Mario Sgrinzato)
2010
1st Trofeo Paolin Fornero
2012
6th Ruota d'Oro
2015
1st Stage 4 Vuelta a Venezuela

== See also ==
- Mirko Tedeschi (cyclist, born 1987)
