= Gambettola =

- Comune
- Comune di Gambettola
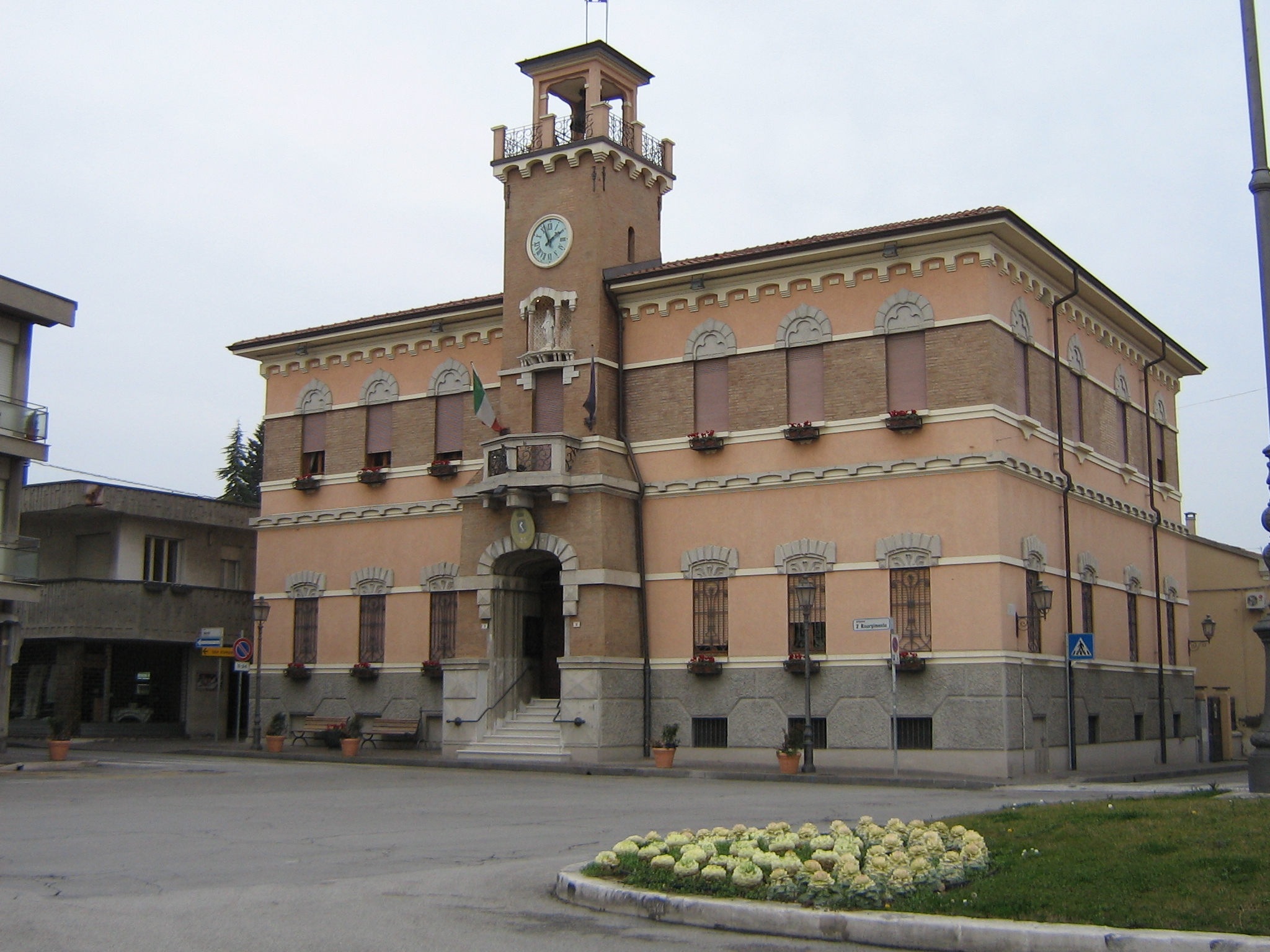
- Town hall

- Location within Italy Location within Emilia-Romagna
- Coordinates: 44°7′N 12°20′E
- Country: Italy
- Region: Emilia-Romagna
- Province: Province of Forlì-Cesena (FC)

Area
  - Total: 7.6 km^{2} (2.9 sq mi)

Population (Dec. 2004)
  - Total: 10,478
  - Density: 1,400/km^{2} (3,600/sq mi)
- Demonym: Gambettolesi
- Time zone: UTC+1 (CET)
  - Summer (DST): UTC+2 (CEST)
- Postal code: 47035
- Dialing code: 0547
- Website: Official website

Gambettola (Romagnol: Gambetla or E' Bosch) is a comune (municipality) in the Province of Forlì-Cesena in the Italian region Emilia-Romagna, located about 90 kilometres (56 mi) southeast of Bologna and about 25 kilometres (16 mi) southeast of Forlì. As of 31 December 2004, it had a population of 10,478 and an area of 7.6 square kilometres (2.9 mi^{2}).

Gambettola borders the following municipalities: Cesena, Cesenatico, Gatteo, Longiano.

== Demographic evolution ==
Historical population

Year	Pop.	±%
1861	1,786	—
1871	1,958	+9.6%
1881	2,078	+6.1%
1901	2,327	+12.0%
1911	2,722	+17.0%

Year	Pop.	±%
1921	3,071	+12.8%
1931	3,228	+5.1%
1936	3,297	+2.1%
1951	4,057	+23.1%
1961	5,111	+26.0%

Year	Pop.	±%
1971	6,471	+26.6%
1981	8,546	+32.1%
1991	9,087	+6.3%
2001	9,416	+3.6%

Source: Data from ISTAT

== Culture ==
Gambettola is famous for its spectacular floats during the carnival season.

Gambettola is twinned with:

- Montichiari, Italy
