= Alessandro Mazzi =

Italian cyclist

Personal information
- Born: 16 November 1987 (age 38) Veneto, Italy

Cycling career
- Sport: Cycling
- Discipline: Road
- Role: Rider

Amateur teams
- 2008: Grigolin Solaris
- 2009–2011: Zalf–Désirée–Fior
- 2012: Petroli Firenze

Professional teams
- 2011: Farnese Vini–Neri Sottoli
- 2013–2014: Utensilnord
- 2015: Nankang–Dynatek

Alessandro Mazzi (born 16 November 1987) is an Italian former racing cyclist. He rode at the 2013 UCI Road World Championships.

== Major results ==
2008
1st Stage 1 Coupe des Nations Ville Saguenay
4th Circuito Belvedere
4th Trofeo Franco Balestra
4th Gran Premio della Liberazione
4th GP Ind.Com.Art di Castelfidardo
6th GP Palio del Recioto
7th Trofeo Piva
9th Ronde van Vlaanderen U23
2011
1st Trofeo Franco Balestra
2012
7th Trofeo Edil C
2013
1st Mountains classification, Settimana Internazionale di Coppi e Bartali
2014
3rd Overall Tour du Maroc
3rd GP Czech Republic, Visegrad 4 Bicycle Race
