= Alberto Sughi =

Italian painter (1928–2012)

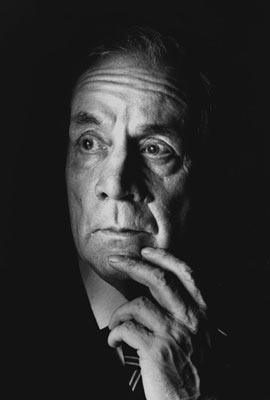
Alberto Sughi

Alberto Sughi (October 5, 1928 – March 31, 2012) was an Italian painter.

== Biography ==
Sughi was born in Cesena, Italy. He started painting in the early 1950s, choosing realism in the debate between abstract and figurative art in the immediate post-war period. He was self-taught as a painter. His paintings depict moments from daily life with no heroes, allowing Enrico Crispolti, in 1956, to define his work as "existential realism". Sughi’s paintings have avoided any attempt at social moralising. His artistic expression proceeds, almost always, in thematic cycles, in the manner of film sequences. First of all, there were his so-called "green paintings", devoted to the relationship between man and nature (1971–1973), then the Supper cycle (1975–1976), after that the twenty paintings and fifteen studies of Imagination and Memory of the Family, dating from the early 1980s; the series Evening or reflection started from 1985. His most recent series of large canvases, exhibited in 2000, is entitled Nocturnal.

Sughi took part in many collective exhibitions of contemporary art, such as the International Biennale art exhibition in Venice to the Quadriennale in Rome. Italian and foreign museums have held retrospective exhibitions; among the most significant are the Gallery of Modern Art in Bologna (1977), the Manezh Gallery in Moscow (1978), the Museum of Castel Sant'Angelo in Rome, the Fine Arts Museum in Budapest and the National Gallery in Prague (1986), the Civic Modern Art Gallery in Ferrara (1988), the Casa Masaccio in San Giovanni Valdarno (1990), the Assis Chateaubriand Art Gallery in São Paulo, Brazil (1994) and the Civic Museum of San Sepolcro (2003). Sughi took part in the cycle of exhibitions entitled The search for identity in Cagliari, Palermo and Ascoli Piceno (2003–2004), the exhibition Evil. Exercises in cruel painting at the Hunting Lodge of Stupinigi, in Turin (2005), and the exhibition "Intimate Portraits from Lotto to Pirandello", at the Regional Archaeological Museum in Aosta (2005).

In 1994, Alberto Sughi was appointed director of the Ente Quadriennale Nazionale d' Arte in Rome.

At the end of 2005 and until 21 January 2006, a large retrospective exhibition of Sughi’s work was held at the Palazzo della Pilotta in Parma. The exhibition contained 642 works, including paintings, tempera, drawings, and lithographs, made between 1959 and 2004, and owned by the collections of the Centro Studi ed Archivio della Comunicazione (CSAC) at the University of Parma, including the painting Rimmel, made in 2004. In April and May 2006, the modern art gallery in Arezzo held the exhibition il Segno e l'Immagine, consisting of 50 works (all made on paper and then applied to canvas) painted in 2005 and 2006. 2007 has seen two new major Alberto Sughi's solo exhibitions, the first hold in the new rooms of the Biblioteca Malatestiana di Cesena, the second in the Complesso Vittoriano, Rome. In May 2009 Alberto Sughi had a new large retrospective this time in Palazzo Sant'Elia, Palermo, Sicily. The exhibition presented a group of ninety paintings, both from public and private collections. The exhibition catalogue featured a long essay "Dove va l'uomo" ("Where man goes") by the exhibition curator Professor Maurizio Calvesi. In September 2009 the same exhibition was shown at the Italian Institute of Culture in London.

In 2011 Alberto Sughi's work Un mondo di freddo e di ghiaccio (A world of ice and of cold) was selected for the 54th Venice Biennale, Padiglione Italia.

== Yoshihiko Wada plagiarism ==
In May 2006, news emerged that the prize-winning Japanese artist, Yoshihiko Wada (aged 66) had been accused of plagiarizing the work of Alberto Sughi (aged 77), having produced several pieces of art virtually identical to pieces from Sughi. The story made national news in Japan. Several pieces of art on exhibition which bore striking similarities to Sughi's works had helped Wada win the Education, Science and Technology Minister's Art Encouragement Prize in March. However, in April the Japan Artists Association and Agency for Cultural Affairs received an anonymous tip-off questioning the authenticity of Wada's work sparking an investigation into the allegations of plagiarism.

Wada denied the plagiarism claims, stating that he had known Sughi ever since he studied in Italy in the 1970s, and claimed to have received artistic influence from Sughi whilst doing study and design work together with him. Wada claims he had painted with Sughi "in collaboration" and therefore the paintings were not plagiarised. Wada told the Japanese newspaper Yomiuri Shimbun he had known Sughi for 40 years and they had drawn together and exchanged opinions. He says the paintings were created as an homage to Sughi and that he had made it clear when exhibiting the works.

Sughi said he was unaware of the existence of the similar paintings until he was contacted by the Japanese embassy in Italy in early May. According to Sughi, Wada had introduced himself as a great fan of his work and had visited his gallery as many as five times taking photos of his works from different angles. Sughi did not know Wada was also an artist and had only thought Wada was a fan of his paintings. Sughi expressed shock at finding out about Wada's works and considered filing a criminal complaint and damage suit against Wada for plagiarism. Sughi claimed that over 30 of Wada's paintings bore an uncanny resemblance to his work and had suggested that the best way to clarify the truth would be to hold an exhibition of his work alongside Wada's. He also expressed that the award Wada had received should be rescinded.

Three of the seven screening judges that decided to award Wada with the art recommendation prize attended a special review meeting. The panel examined the investigation reports, statements, and pictorial records from Wada and Sughi, with a focus on Wada's "Drama and Poesie" memoir exhibition, which was the basis for his prize. They concluded that there was insufficient evidence to assume Wada's works were not stolen. The Agency for Cultural Affairs also concluded that several of Wada's works appeared to be plagiarised and decided on June 5 (Monday) to strip Wada of the prize he won. This was the first time since the award was set up in 1950 that an artist was stripped of the award.
