= Mirko Tedeschi (cyclist, born 1987) =

Italian bicycle racer

Personal information
- Full name: Mirko Tedeschi
- Born: 17 December 1987 (age 38) Gallarate, Italy

Cycling career
- Sport: Cycling
- Discipline: Road
- Role: Rider

Amateur teams
- 2006: Garlaschese
- 2007: ProgettoCiclismo–OTC Doors
- 2008–2010: Pool Cantu–Feralpi
- 2011: Viris Vigevano–Lomellina

Professional teams
- 2010: Carmiooro NGC (stagiaire)
- 2011: Lampre–ISD (stagiaire)
- 2013–2014: Team Idea

Mirko Tedeschi (born 17 December 1987 in Gallarate) is an Italian cyclist, who last rode for Team Idea.

== Major results ==
2008
10th Piccolo Giro di Lombardia
2010
6th Piccolo Giro di Lombardia
8th Ruota d'Oro
10th Trofeo Edil C
2012
5th Piccolo Giro di Lombardia
2013
1st GP Industria Commercio Artigianato-Botticino
1st Trofeo MP Filtri
6th Trofeo Edil C
2014
1st Mountains classification Settimana Internazionale di Coppi e Bartali
2nd Overall Course de la Solidarité Olympique
4th Giro del Medio Brenta
5th Coppa della Pace
6th Trofeo Alcide Degasperi
10th Overall Rás Tailteann

== See also ==
- Mirko Tedeschi (cyclist, born 1989)
