= Longiano =

- Comune
- Comune di Longiano
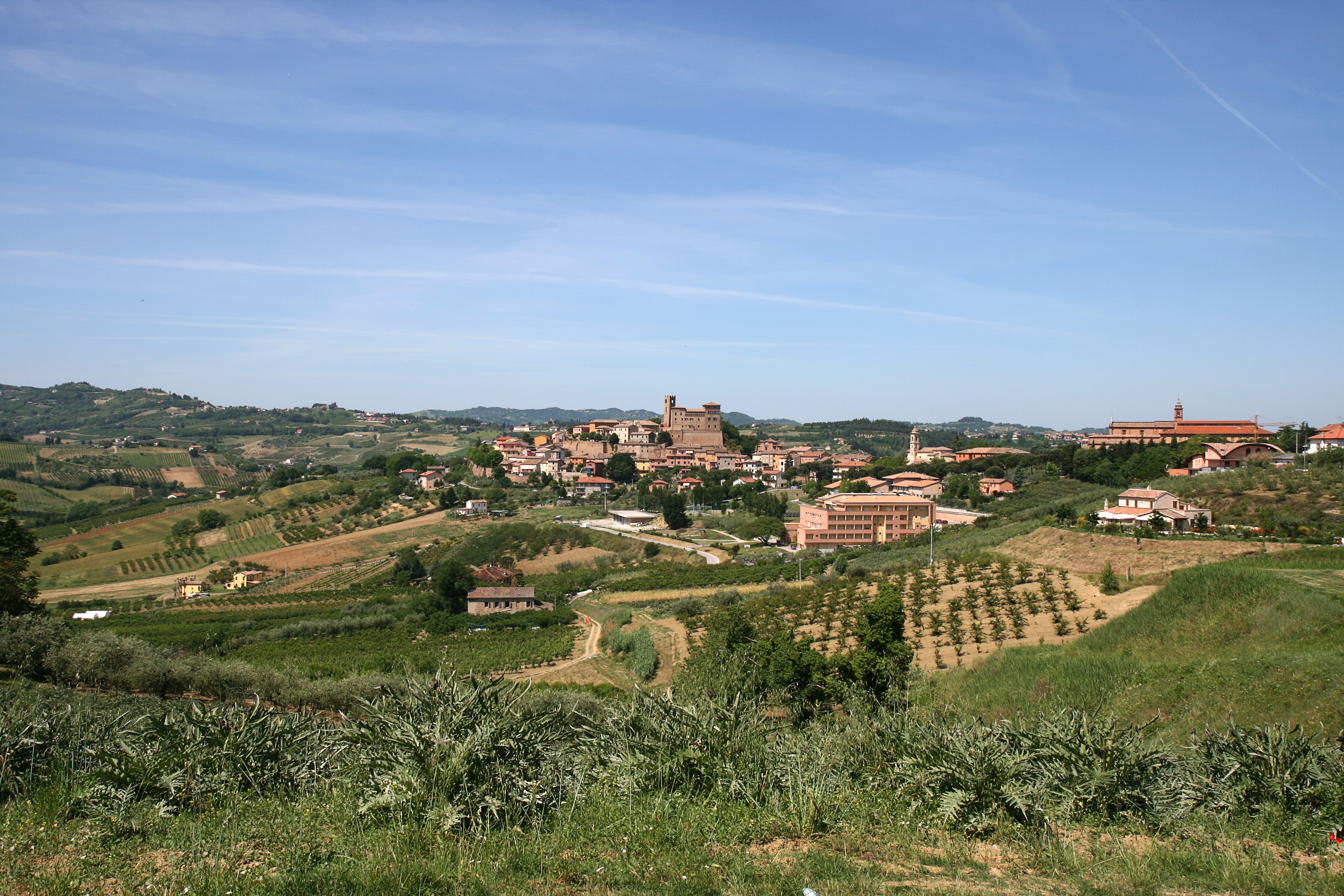
- View of Longiano

- Location within Italy Location within Emilia-Romagna
- Coordinates: 44°4′30″N 12°19′40″E
- Country: Italy
- Region: Emilia-Romagna
- Province: Province of Forlì-Cesena (FC)
- Frazioni: Capoluogo, Budrio, Ponte Ospedaletto, Crocetta, Montilgallo, Felloniche, Badia, Massa

Area
  - Total: 23.6 km^{2} (9.1 sq mi)
- Elevation: 169 m (554 ft)

Population (Dec. 2004)
  - Total: 6,042
  - Density: 256/km^{2} (663/sq mi)
- Demonym: Longianesi
- Time zone: UTC+1 (CET)
  - Summer (DST): UTC+2 (CEST)
- Postal code: 47020
- Dialing code: 0547
- Patron saint: St. Christopher
- Website: Official website

Longiano (Romagnol: Lunzèn) is a comune (municipality) in the Province of Forlì-Cesena in the Italian region Emilia-Romagna, located about 90 kilometres (56 mi) southeast of Bologna and about 30 kilometres (19 mi) southeast of Forlì. Longiano borders the following municipalities: Borghi, Cesena, Gambettola, Gatteo, Montiano, Roncofreddo, Santarcangelo di Romagna, Savignano sul Rubicone.

== Main sights ==
- Castello Malatestiano (Castle, 13th century): now houses the Fondazione Tito Balestra, a museum of contemporary and modern art from the region of Emilia Romagna.
- Teatro Petrella (19th century)

== Demographic evolution ==
Historical population

| Year | Pop. | ±% |
|---|---|---|
| 1861 | 3,327 | — |
| 1871 | 3,619 | +8.8% |
| 1881 | 3,595 | −0.7% |
| 1901 | 3,994 | +11.1% |
| 1911 | 4,406 | +10.3% |

| Year | Pop. | ±% |
|---|---|---|
| 1921 | 4,343 | −1.4% |
| 1931 | 4,328 | −0.3% |
| 1936 | 4,381 | +1.2% |
| 1951 | 4,331 | −1.1% |
| 1961 | 4,022 | −7.1% |

| Year | Pop. | ±% |
|---|---|---|
| 1971 | 4,181 | +4.0% |
| 1981 | 4,426 | +5.9% |
| 1991 | 4,699 | +6.2% |
| 2001 | 5,587 | +18.9% |

Source: Data from ISTAT
