= Spodnji Hotič =

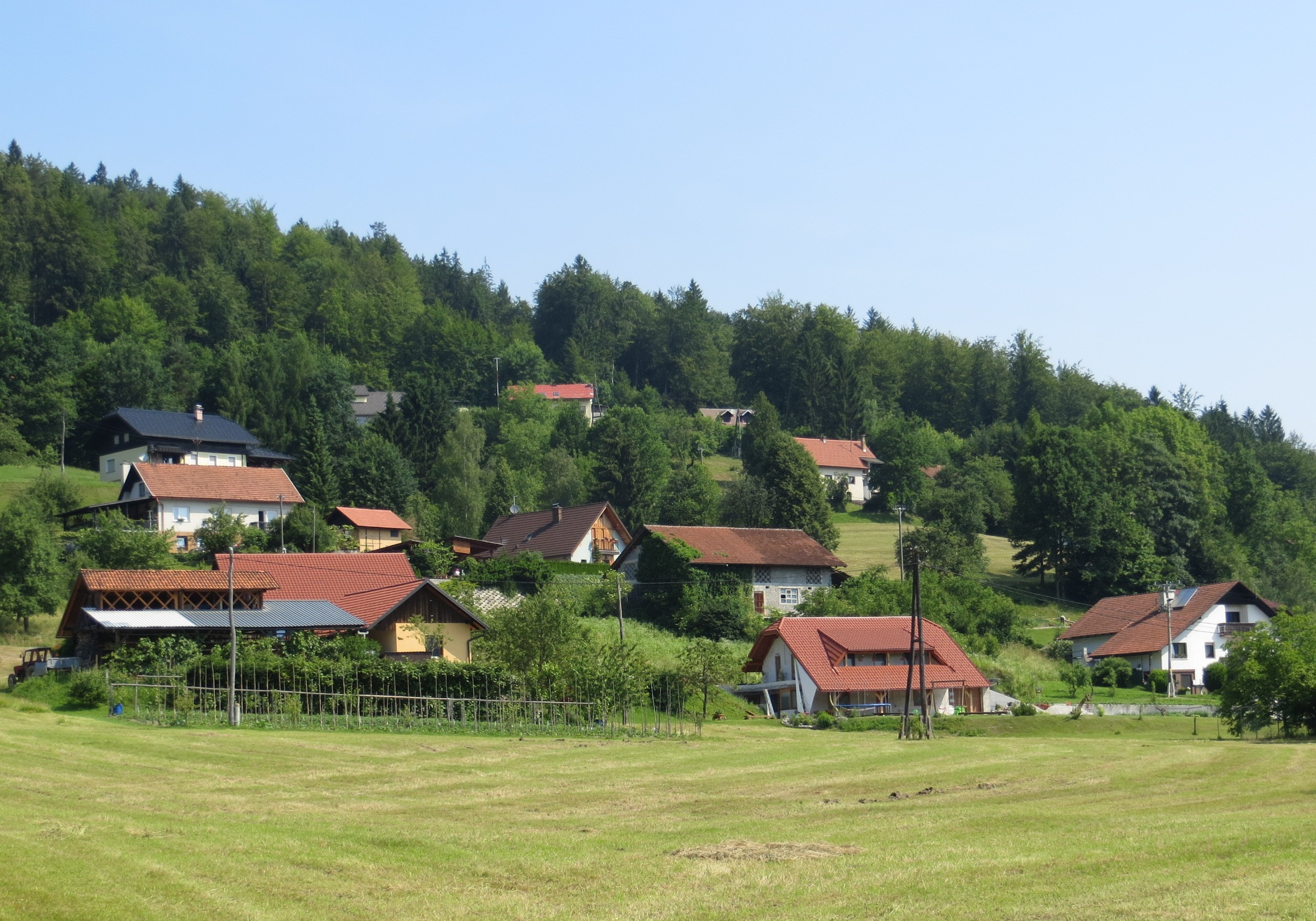

- Location in Slovenia
- Coordinates: 46°5′31.86″N 14°49′37.54″E
- Country: Slovenia
- Traditional region: Upper Carniola
- Statistical region: Central Sava
- Municipality: Litija

Area
  - Total: 1.72 km^{2} (0.66 sq mi)
- Elevation: 250.7 m (823 ft)

Population (2002)
  - Total: 220
- Postal code: 1270

Spodnji Hotič (pronounced [ˈspoːdnji xɔˈtitʃ]; in older sources also Spodnje Hotiče, German: Unterhöttisch) is a settlement on the left bank of the Sava River north of Litija in central Slovenia. The area is part of the traditional region of Upper Carniola and is now included with the rest of the Municipality of Litija in the Central Sava Statistical Region.
