= Montecuccolo Castle =

Coordinates: 44.3128°N 10.8153°E

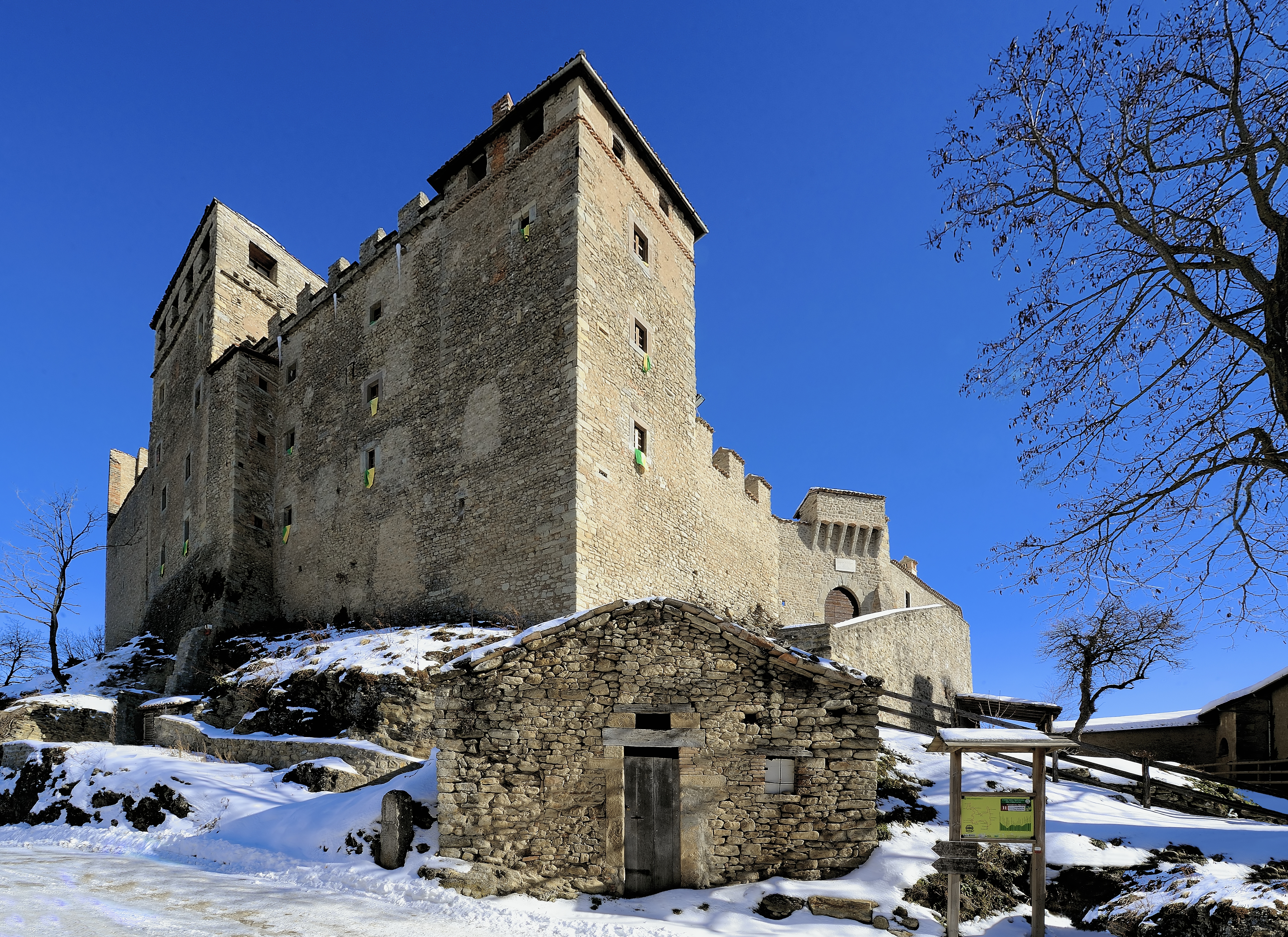
The Castello di Montecuccolo

Montecuccolo Castle (Italian: Castello di Montecuccolo) is a castle in Pavullo nel Frignano, Modena, Italy.

== History ==
The castle was the birthplace of the 17th-century condottiero Raimondo Montecuccoli.

== Construction ==
The castle's main tower was built in the 11th century as a watchtower to protect the surrounding town. A defensive wooden palisade was erected at its base. In the 12th century, an adjoining fortified house was constructed, along with stone walls that replaced the original palisade.

During the 13th and 14th centuries, additional buildings were added and the walls were extended to enclose them, forming an internal piazza. In the 15th and 16th centuries, a church—the Church of San Lorenzo—was built, enclosing a second, smaller piazza at a lower elevation than the earlier structures.

== See also ==
- List of castles in Italy
