= Gatteo =

- Comune
- Comune di Gatteo
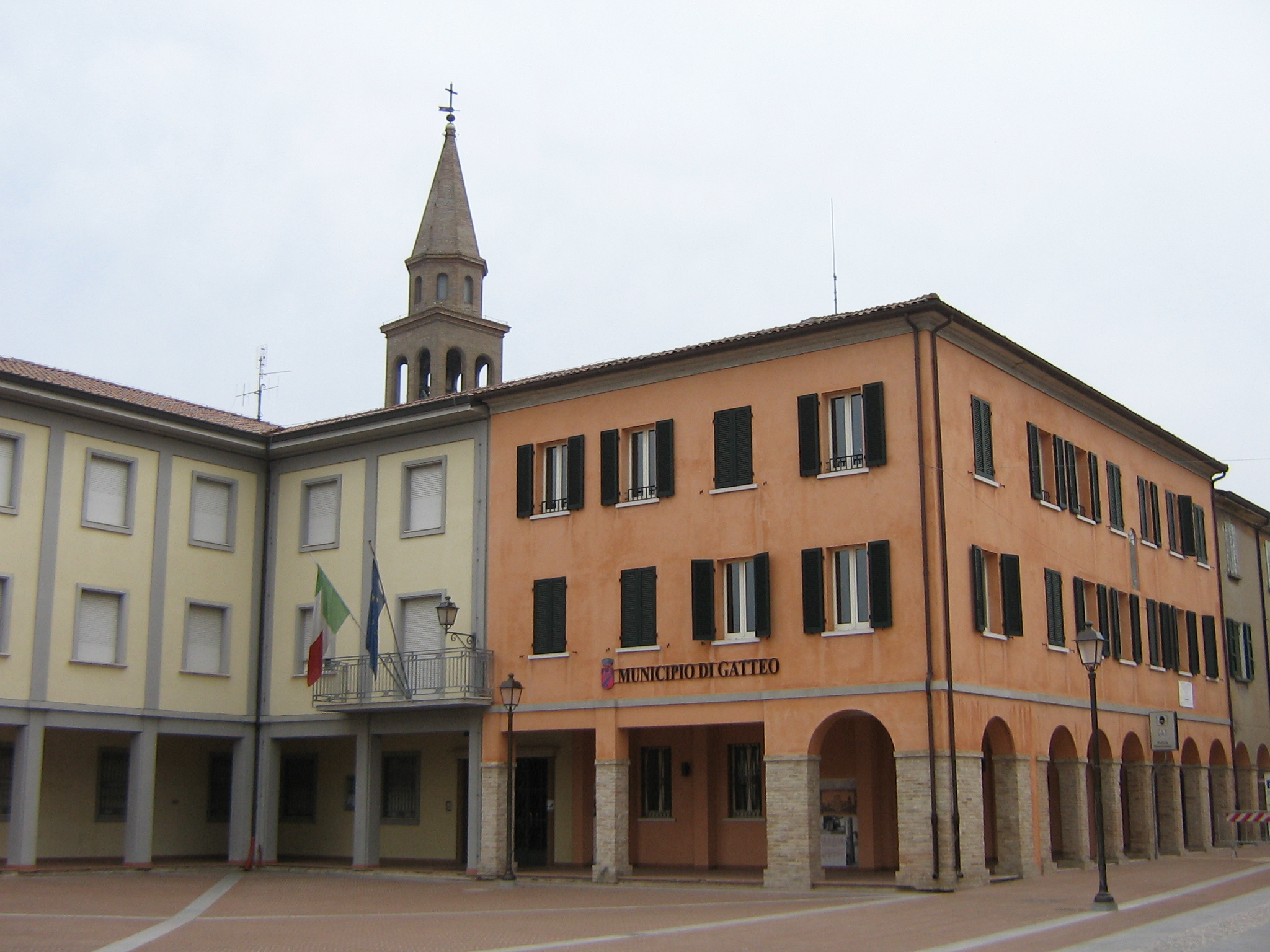
- Municipal office

- Location within Italy Location within Emilia-Romagna
- Coordinates: 44°6′N 12°23′E
- Country: Italy
- Region: Emilia-Romagna
- Province: Province of Forlì-Cesena (FC)
- Frazioni: Fiumicino, Gatteo a Mare, Sant'Angelo

Area
  - Total: 14.1 km^{2} (5.4 sq mi)

Population (Dec. 2004)
  - Total: 7,252
  - Density: 514/km^{2} (1,330/sq mi)
- Demonym: Gatteesi
- Time zone: UTC+1 (CET)
  - Summer (DST): UTC+2 (CEST)
- Postal code: 47030, 47039, 47043
- Dialing code: 0541, 0547
- Patron saint: St. Lawrence
- Saint day: August 10
- Website: Official website

Gatteo (Romagnol: Gatì) is a comune (municipality) in the Province of Forlì-Cesena in the Italian region Emilia-Romagna, located about 90 kilometres (56 mi) southeast of Bologna and about 30 kilometres (19 mi) southeast of Forlì. As of 31 December 2004, it had a population of 7,252 and an area of 14.1 square kilometres (5.4 mi^{2}).

Gatteo borders the following municipalities: Cesenatico, Gambettola, Longiano, Savignano sul Rubicone.

== Demographic evolution ==
Historical population

Year	Pop.	±%
1861	2,943	—
1871	3,110	+5.7%
1881	3,313	+6.5%
1901	3,638	+9.8%
1911	3,692	+1.5%

Year	Pop.	±%
1921	3,796	+2.8%
1931	3,773	−0.6%
1936	3,853	+2.1%
1951	3,943	+2.3%
1961	4,072	+3.3%

Year	Pop.	±%
1971	5,020	+23.3%
1981	5,431	+8.2%
1991	5,879	+8.2%
2001	6,799	+15.6%

Source: Data from ISTAT
