= 2026 Tour de l'Ain =

2026 UCI Europe Tour

Race details
- Dates: 28-30 July 2026
- Stages: 3
- Distance: 454.3 km (282.3 mi)
- Winning time: 10h 46' 15"

Results
Jersey awarded to the overall winner	Winner	Markel Beloki (ESP)	(EF Education–EasyPost)
	Second	Axel Mariault (FRA)	(CIC Pro Cycling Academy)
	Third	Jamie Meehan (IRL)	(Cofidis)
Jersey awarded to the points classification winner	Points	Markel Beloki (ESP)	(EF Education–EasyPost)
Jersey awarded to the mountains classification winner	Mountains	Patryk Goszczurny (POL)	(Visma–Lease a Bike Development)
Jersey awarded to the young rider classification winner	Young rider	Markel Beloki (ESP)	(EF Education–EasyPost)
	Team	Soudal–Quick-Step	

The 2026 Tour de l'Ain is a men's road cycling stage race that took place between 28 and 30 July 2026 in the French department of Ain. The race was rated as a category 2.1 event on the 2026 UCI Europe Tour calendar, and is the 38th edition of the Tour de l'Ain.

== Teams ==
Five of the eighteen UCI WorldTeams, three UCI ProTeams, nine UCI Continental teams, and one national team made up the eighteen teams that participated in the race.

UCI WorldTeams

- Decathlon CMA CGM
- EF Education–EasyPost
- Groupama–FDJ United
- Soudal–Quick-Step
- XDS Astana Team

UCI ProTeams

- Cofidis
- Team TotalEnergies
- Unibet Rose Rockets

UCI Continental Teams

- Bourg-en-Bresse Ain Cyclisme
- CIC Pro Cycling Academy
- Development Team Picnic–PostNL
- Elite Fondations Cycling Team
- Lidl–Trek Future Racing
- St. Michel–Preference Home–Auber93
- Van Rysel–Roubaix
- Vélo Club Villefranche Beaujolais
- Visma–Lease a Bike Development

National Teams

- France U23

== Route ==
Stage characteristics and winners
Stage	Date	Course	Distance	Type	Stage winner
1	28 July	Parc des Oiseaux to Bourg-en-Bresse	160.9 km (100.0 mi)	Flat stage	Noah Hobbs (GBR)
2	29 July	Saint-Vulbas to Lagnieu	161.9 km (100.6 mi)	Mountain stage	Markel Beloki (ESP)
3	30 July	Oyonnax to Lélex Monts-Jura	131.5 km (81.7 mi)	Hilly stage	Axel Mariault (FRA)
Total			454.3 km (282.3 mi)		

== Stages ==
=== Stage 1 ===
28 July 2026 – Parc des Oiseaux to Bourg-en-Bresse, 160.9 km (100.0 mi)

Stage 1 Result (1–10)
Rank	Rider	Team	Time
1	Noah Hobbs (GBR)	EF Education–EasyPost	3h 27' 02"
2	Alberto Dainese (ITA)	Soudal–Quick-Step	+ 0"
3	Bohémond Barrillot (FRA)	France U23	+ 0"
4	Matteo Milan (ITA)	Groupama–FDJ United	+ 0"
5	Alessio Delle Vedove (ITA)	XDS Astana Team	+ 0"
6	Louis Hardouin (FRA)	Van Rysel–Roubaix	+ 0"
7	Jason Tesson (FRA)	Team TotalEnergies	+ 0"
8	Mathias Sanlaville (FRA)	CIC Pro Cycling Academy	+ 0"
9	Rémi Lelandais (FRA)	Bourg-en-Bresse Ain Cyclisme	+ 0"
10	Tord Gudmestad (NOR)	Decathlon CMA CGM	+ 0"

General classification after Stage 1 (1–10)
Rank	Rider	Team	Time
1	Noah Hobbs (GBR)	EF Education–EasyPost	3h 27' 02"
2	Alberto Dainese (ITA)	Soudal–Quick-Step	+ 0"
3	Bohémond Barrillot (FRA)	France U23	+ 0"
4	Matteo Milan (ITA)	Groupama–FDJ United	+ 0"
5	Alessio Delle Vedove (ITA)	XDS Astana Team	+ 0"
6	Louis Hardouin (FRA)	Van Rysel–Roubaix	+ 0"
7	Jason Tesson (FRA)	Team TotalEnergies	+ 0"
8	Mathias Sanlaville (FRA)	CIC Pro Cycling Academy	+ 0"
9	Rémi Lelandais (FRA)	Bourg-en-Bresse Ain Cyclisme	+ 0"
10	Tord Gudmestad (NOR)	Decathlon CMA CGM	+ 0"

=== Stage 2 ===
29 July 2026 – Saint-Vulbas to Lagnieu, 161.9 km (100.6 mi)

Stage 2 Result (1–10)
Rank	Rider	Team	Time
1	Markel Beloki (ESP)	EF Education–EasyPost	3h 52' 38"
2	Noa Isidore (FRA)	Decathlon CMA CGM	+ 55"
3	Nicola Conci (ITA)	XDS Astana Team	+ 55"
4	Axel Mariault (FRA)	CIC Pro Cycling Academy	+ 55"
5	Rémi Arsac (FRA)	Decathlon CMA CGM	+ 55"
6	Jamie Meehan (IRL)	Cofidis	+ 55"
7	Henrique Bravo (BRA)	Soudal–Quick-Step	+ 55"
8	Adam Howell (GBR)	Bourg-en-Bresse Ain Cyclisme	+ 55"
9	Huw Buck Jones (GBR)	Bourg-en-Bresse Ain Cyclisme	+ 55"
10	Geoffrey Bouchard (FRA)	Team TotalEnergies	+ 55"

General classification after Stage 2 (1–10)
Rank	Rider	Team	Time
1	Markel Beloki (ESP)	EF Education–EasyPost	7h 19' 43"
2	Axel Mariault (FRA)	CIC Pro Cycling Academy	+ 52"
3	Noa Isidore (FRA)	Decathlon CMA CGM	+ 55"
4	Jamie Meehan (IRL)	Cofidis	+ 55"
5	Henrique Bravo (BRA)	Soudal–Quick-Step	+ 55"
6	Jefferson Alexander Cepeda (COL)	EF Education–EasyPost	+ 55"
7	Rémi Arsac (FRA)	Decathlon CMA CGM	+ 55"
8	Adam Howell (GBR)	Bourg-en-Bresse Ain Cyclisme	+ 55"
9	Huw Buck Jones (GBR)	Bourg-en-Bresse Ain Cyclisme	+ 55"
10	Nicola Conci (ITA)	XDS Astana Team	+ 55"

=== Stage 3 ===
30 July 2026 – Oyonnax to Lélex Monts-Jura, 131.5 km (81.7 mi)

Stage 3 Result (1–10)
Rank	Rider	Team	Time
1	Axel Mariault (FRA)	CIC Pro Cycling Academy	3h 26' 32"
2	Markel Beloki (ESP)	EF Education–EasyPost	+ 0"
3	Brieuc Rolland (FRA)	Groupama–FDJ United	+ 0"
4	Jamie Meehan (IRL)	Cofidis	+ 0"
5	Rémi Arsac (FRA)	Decathlon CMA CGM	+ 0"
6	Nicola Conci (ITA)	XDS Astana Team	+ 0"
7	Henrique Bravo (BRA)	Soudal–Quick-Step	+ 0"
8	Huw Buck Jones (GBR)	Bourg-en-Bresse Ain Cyclisme	+ 5"
9	Jefferson Alexander Cepeda (ECU)	EF Education–EasyPost	+ 5"
10	Thomas Gachignard (FRA)	Team TotalEnergies	+ 57"

Final general classification (1–10)
Rank	Rider	Team	Time
1	Markel Beloki (ESP)	EF Education–EasyPost	10h 46' 15"
2	Axel Mariault (FRA)	CIC Pro Cycling Academy	+ 52"
3	Jamie Meehan (IRL)	Cofidis	+ 55"
4	Henrique Bravo (BRA)	Soudal–Quick-Step	+ 55"
5	Rémi Arsac (FRA)	Decathlon CMA CGM	+ 55"
6	Nicola Conci (ITA)	XDS Astana Team	+ 55"
7	Jefferson Alexander Cepeda (COL)	EF Education–EasyPost	+ 1' 00"
8	Huw Buck Jones (GBR)	Bourg-en-Bresse Ain Cyclisme	+ 1' 00"
9	Adam Howell (GBR)	Bourg-en-Bresse Ain Cyclisme	+ 2' 17"
10	José Said Cisneros (MEX)	Soudal–Quick-Step	+ 2' 19"

== Classification leadership ==
Classification leadership by stage
Stage	Winner	General classification	Points classification	Mountains classification	Young rider classification	Team classification	Combativity award
1	Noah Hobbs	Noah Hobbs	Noah Hobbs (Note: On stage 2, Alberto Dainese, who was second in the points classification, wore the green jersey, because first-placed Noah Hobbs wore the yellow jersey as the leader of the general classification.)	Baptiste Berger	Noah Hobbs (Note: On stage 2, Bohémond Barrillot, who was second in the young riders classification, wore the white jersey, because first-placed Noah Hobbs wore the yellow jersey as the leader of the general classification.)	Van Rysel–Roubaix	Arthur Meyer
2	Markel Beloki	Markel Beloki	Markel Beloki (Note: On stage 3, Noah Hobbs, who was second in the points classification, wore the green jersey, because first-placed Markel Beloki wore the yellow jersey as the leader of the general classification.)	Henrique Bravo	Markel Beloki (Note: On stage 3, Noa Isidore, who was second in the young riders classification, wore the white jersey, because first-placed Markel Beloki wore the yellow jersey as the leader of the general classification.)	XDS Astana Team	Thomas Gachignard
3	Axel Mariault	Markel Beloki	Markel Beloki	Patryk Goszczurny	Markel Beloki	Soudal–Quick-Step	Gil Gelders
Final		Markel Beloki	Markel Beloki	Patryk Goszczurny	Markel Beloki	Soudal–Quick-Step	

== Final classification standings ==
Legend
Denotes the winner of the general classification	Denotes the winner of the young rider classification
Denotes the winner of the points classification	Denotes the winner of the combativity award
Denotes the winner of the mountains classification	

=== General classification ===
Final general classification (1–10)
Rank	Rider	Team	Time
1	Markel Beloki (ESP)	EF Education–EasyPost	10h 46' 15"
2	Axel Mariault (FRA)	CIC Pro Cycling Academy	+ 52"
3	Jamie Meehan (IRL)	Cofidis	+ 55"
4	Henrique Bravo (BRA)	Soudal–Quick-Step	+ 55"
5	Rémi Arsac (FRA)	Decathlon CMA CGM	+ 55"
6	Nicola Conci (ITA)	XDS Astana Team	+ 55"
7	Jefferson Alexander Cepeda (COL)	EF Education–EasyPost	+ 1' 00"
8	Huw Buck Jones (GBR)	Bourg-en-Bresse Ain Cyclisme	+ 1' 00"
9	Adam Howell (GBR)	Bourg-en-Bresse Ain Cyclisme	+ 2' 17"
10	José Said Cisneros (MEX)	Soudal–Quick-Step	+ 2' 19"

=== Points classification ===
Final points classification (1–10)
Rank	Rider	Team	Points
1	Markel Beloki (ESP)	EF Education–EasyPost	45
2	Axel Mariault (FRA)	CIC Pro Cycling Academy	39
3	Nicola Conci (ITA)	XDS Astana Team	26
4	Jamie Meehan (IRL)	Cofidis	24
5	Rémi Arsac (FRA)	Decathlon CMA CGM	24
6	Noa Isidore (FRA)	Decathlon CMA CGM	20
7	Alberto Dainese (ITA)	Soudal–Quick-Step	20
8	Henrique Bravo (BRA)	Soudal–Quick-Step	18
9	Brieuc Rolland (FRA)	Groupama–FDJ United	16
10	Jason Tesson (FRA)	Team TotalEnergies	15

=== Mountains classification ===
Final mountains classification (1–10)
Rank	Rider	Team	Points
1	Patryk Goszczurny (POL)	Visma–Lease a Bike Development	41
2	Eivind Fougner (NOR)	Unibet Rose Rockets	40
3	Henrique Bravo (BRA)	Soudal–Quick-Step	25
4	Jamie Meehan (IRL)	Cofidis	15
5	Markel Beloki (ESP)	EF Education–EasyPost	14
6	Johan Jacobs (SUI)	Groupama–FDJ United	13
7	Maximilien Juillard (FRA)	Vélo Club Villefranche Beaujolais	10
8	Gil Gelders (BEL)	Soudal–Quick-Step	10
9	Alexys Brunel (FRA)	Team TotalEnergies	8
10	Morné van Niekerk (RSA)	St. Michel–Preference Home–Auber93	7

=== Young rider classification ===
Final young rider classification (1–10)
Rank	Rider	Team	Time
1	Markel Beloki (ESP)	EF Education–EasyPost	10h 46' 15"
2	Henrique Bravo (BRA)	Soudal–Quick-Step	+ 55"
3	Rémi Arsac (FRA)	Decathlon CMA CGM	+ 55"
4	Huw Buck Jones (GBR)	Bourg-en-Bresse Ain Cyclisme	+ 1' 00"
5	Adam Howell (GBR)	Bourg-en-Bresse Ain Cyclisme	+ 2' 17"
6	José Said Cisneros (MEX)	Soudal–Quick-Step	+ 2' 19"
7	Tom Lambert Wetzel (FRA)	Vélo Club Villefranche Beaujolais	+ 3' 45"
8	Louis Leidert (GER)	Lidl–Trek Future Racing	+ 4' 17"
9	Sven Mernik (SLO)	Visma–Lease a Bike Development	+ 4' 20"
10	Noa Isidore (FRA)	Decathlon CMA CGM	+ 4' 30"

=== Team classification ===
Final team classification (1–10)
Rank	Team	Time
1	Soudal–Quick-Step	32h 35' 50"
2	Bourg-en-Bresse Ain Cyclisme	+ 44"
3	Van Rysel–Roubaix	+ 1' 55"
4	EF Education–EasyPost	+ 3' 17"
5	Team TotalEnergies	+ 7' 19"
6	Unibet Rose Rockets	+ 7' 20"
7	Decathlon CMA CGM	+ 11' 12"
8	CIC Pro Cycling Academy	+ 11' 26"
9	XDS Astana Team	+ 12' 30"
10	Cofidis	+ 15' 21"
