= Axel Mariault =

French cyclist

Personal information
- Born: 7 June 1998 (age 28) Liffré, France

Cycling career
- Sport: Cycling
- Current team: CIC Pro Cycling Academy
- Discipline: Road
- Role: Rider

Amateur teams
- 2017–2018: Team Pays de Dinan
- 2019–2021: Team UC Nantes Atlantique

Professional teams
- 2022: Team UC Nantes Atlantique
- 2023–2024: Cofidis
- 2025–: CIC–U–Nantes

Axel Mariault (born 7 June 1998) is a French racing cyclist who rides for UCI Continental team CIC Pro Cycling Academy.

== Career ==
On 30 September 2022 it was announced Mariault would join UCI WorldTeam Cofidis on a two-year contract from 2023.

== Major results ==
2016
8th Ronde des Vallées
2021
1st Road race, National Amateur Road Championships
2022
9th Tour du Limousin
2024
6th Cadel Evans Great Ocean Road Race
10th Classic Loire Atlantique
10th Prueba Villafranca de Ordizia
2025
3rd Overall Tour Alsace
3rd Polynormande
10th Overall Tour de l'Ain
2026
5th Overall Tour du Limousin
7th Tour des Alpes-Maritimes
10th Classic Grand Besançon Doubs
