= Jonathan Vervenne =

Belgian cyclist

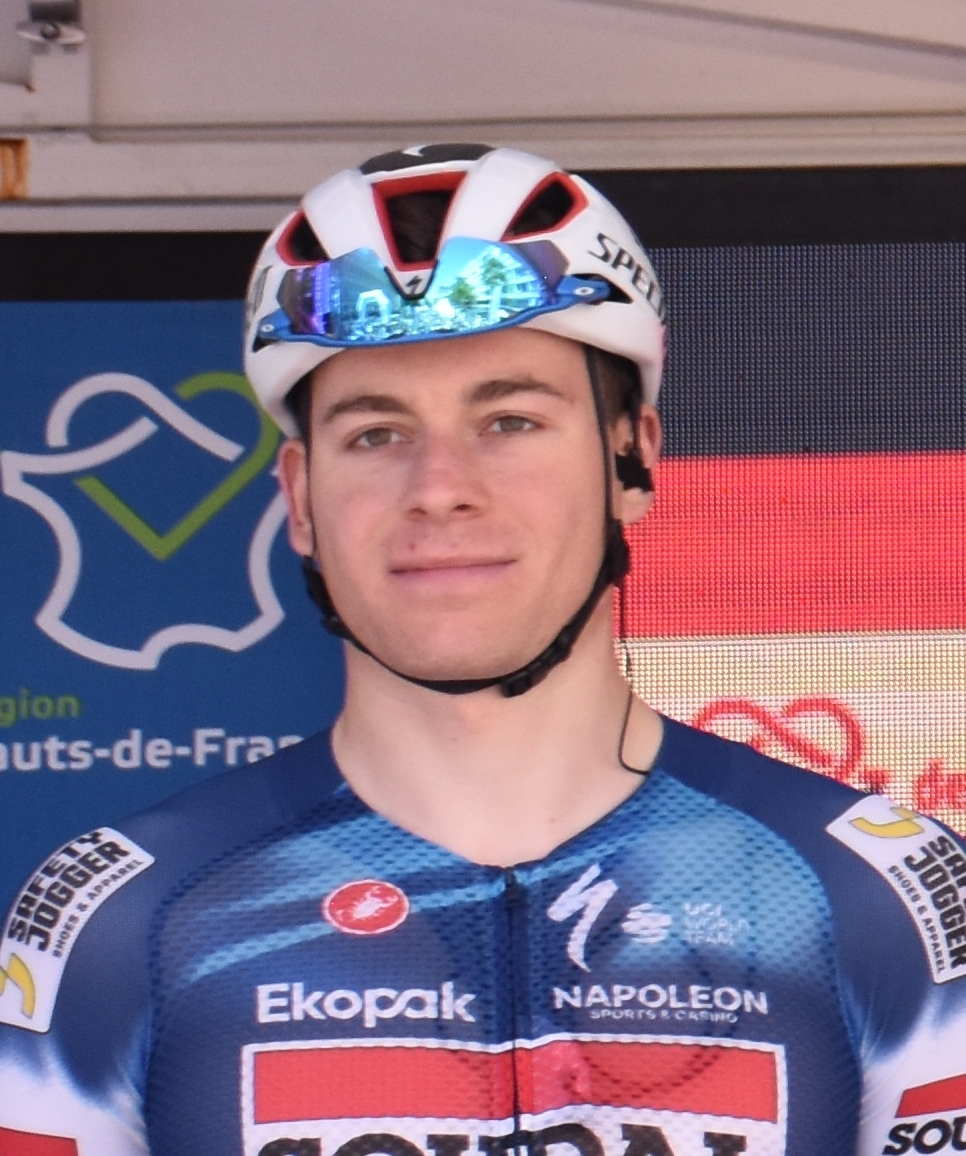
- Vervenne in 2025

Personal information
- Born: 27 May 2003 (age 23) Genk, Belgium
- Height: 1.87 m (6 ft 2 in)
- Weight: 72 kg (159 lb)

Cycling career
- Sport: Cycling
- Current team: Soudal–Quick-Step Devo Team
- Discipline: Road
- Role: Rider
- Rider type: Time trialist

Amateur team
- 2021: Acrog–Balen BC Junior

Professional team
- 2022–2025: Elevate p/b Home Solution–Soenens
Medal record
Men's road bicycle racing
Representing Belgium
European Championships
| Gold medal – first place | 2025 Guilherand-Granges | Under-23 time trial |

Jonathan Vervenne (born 27 May 2003) is a Belgian professional racing cyclist, who currently rides for UCI Continental team Soudal–Quick-Step Devo Team. He will join UCI WorldTeam Soudal–Quick-Step in 2026.

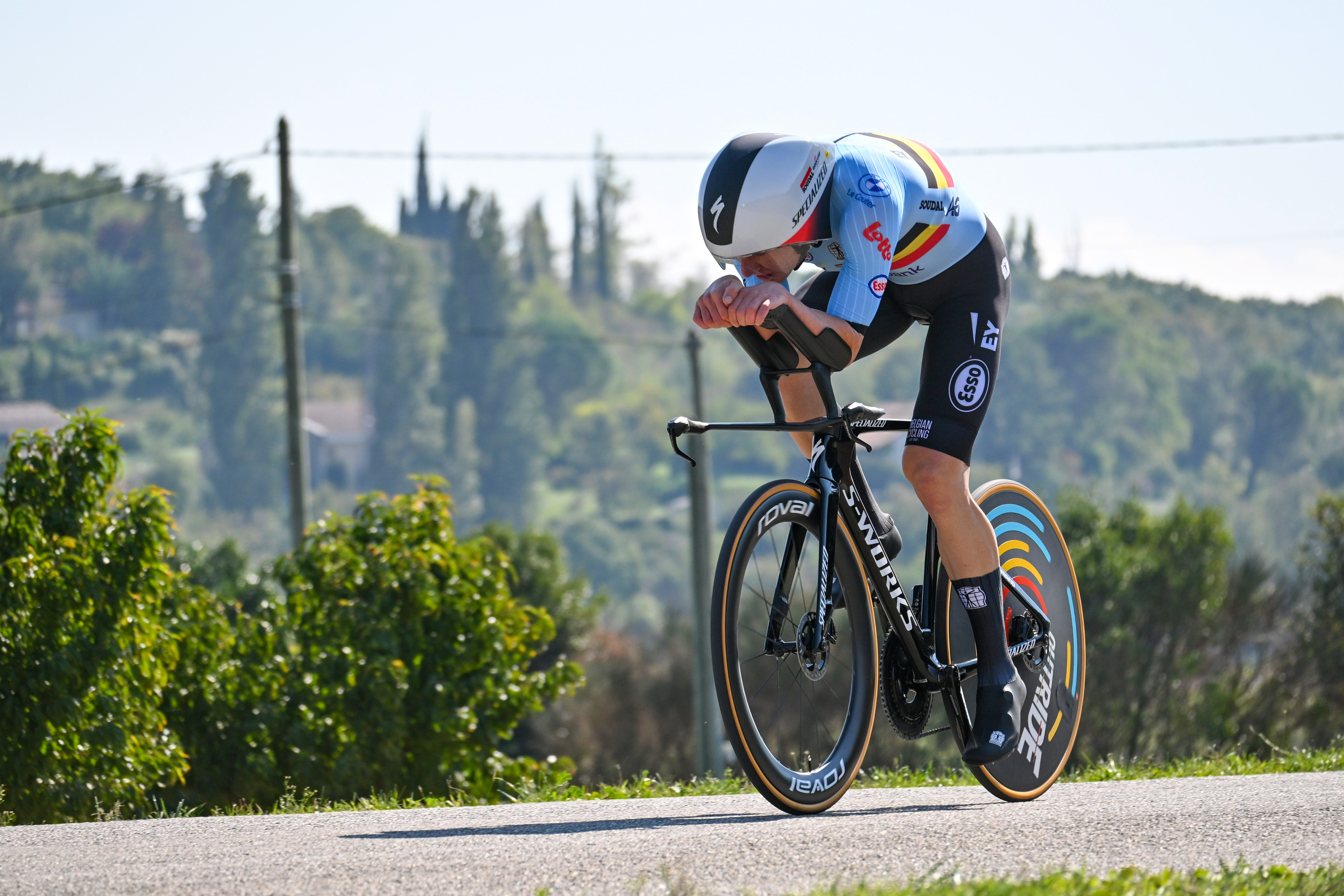
Vervenne during the 2025 European Road Championships U-23 TT

== Major results ==
2021
3rd Time trial, National Junior Road Championships
2022
2nd Time trial, National Under-23 Road Championships
2nd Testtijdrit Poperinge
5th Time trial, UEC European Under-23 Road Championships
7th Chrono des Nations Under-23
2023
1st Time trial, National Under-23 Road Championships
1st Tour des 100 Communes
1st Zuidkempense Pijl
1st Mountains classification, Giro della Valle d'Aosta
10th Grand Prix de la Ville de Lillers
2024
1st Stage 1 (TTT) Tour du Rwanda
2nd Memorial Igor Decraene
3rd Chrono des Nations Under-23
9th Overall West Bohemia Tour
2025
1st Time trial, European Under-23 Road Championships
1st Time trial, National Under-23 Road Championships
1st Chrono Challenge Poperinge
1st Stage 2 Giro Next Gen
5th Volta NXT Classic
8th Time trial, UCI Road World Under-23 Championships
