= 2026 Volta a la Comunitat Valenciana =

2026 UCI ProSeries

Race details
- Dates: 4–8 February 2026
- Stages: 5
- Distance: 601.7 km (373.9 mi)
- Winning time: 13h 10' 12"

Results
Jersey awarded to the overall winner	Winner	Remco Evenepoel (BEL)	(Red Bull–Bora–Hansgrohe)
	Second	João Almeida (POR)	(UAE Team Emirates XRG)
	Third	Giulio Pellizzari (ITA)	(Red Bull–Bora–Hansgrohe)
Jersey awarded to the points classification winner	Points	Biniam Girmay (ERI)	(NSN Cycling Team)
Jersey awarded to the mountains classification winner	Mountains	Danny van der Tuuk (POL)	(Euskaltel–Euskadi)
Jersey awarded to the young rider classification winner	Young rider	Giulio Pellizzari (ITA)	(Red Bull–Bora–Hansgrohe)
	Team	(Germany) Red Bull–Bora–Hansgrohe	

The 2026 Volta a la Comunitat Valenciana, a road cycling stage race, was the 77th edition of the Volta a la Comunitat Valenciana, which was part of the 2026 UCI ProSeries. It began on the 4th of February in Segorbe and finished on the 8th in Valencia.

== Teams ==
Nine UCI WorldTeams, seven UCI ProTeams and two UCI Continental Teams made up the eighteen teams that took part in the race.

UCI WorldTeams

- INEOS Grenadiers
- Lidl–Trek
- Movistar Team
- NSN Cycling Team
- Red Bull–Bora–Hansgrohe
- Soudal–Quick-Step
- Team Bahrain Victorious
- UAE Team Emirates XRG
- Uno-X Mobility

UCI ProTeams

- Burgos Burpellet BH
- Caja Rural–Seguros RGA
- Equipo Kern Pharma
- Euskaltel–Euskadi
- Solution Tech NIPPO Rali
- Team Novo Nordisk
- Team Polti VisitMalta

UCI Continental Teams

- APS Pro Cycling by Team Cadence Cyclery
- Petrolike

== Route ==
Stage characteristics and winners
Stage	Date	Course	Distance	Type	Stage winner
1	4 February	Segorbe to Torreblanca	160 km (99 mi)	Hilly stage	Biniam Girmay (ERI)
2	5 February	Carlet to Alginet	17 km (11 mi)	Individual time trial	Remco Evenepoel (BEL)
3	6 February	Orihuela to San Vicente del Raspeig	158 km (98 mi)	Mountain stage	Andrew August (USA)
4	7 February	La Nucía to Teulada Moraira	172 km (107 mi)	Hilly stage	Remco Evenepoel (BEL)
5	8 February	Bétera to Valencia	94.7 km (58.8 mi)	Hilly stage	Raúl García Pierna (ESP)
Total			601.7 km (373.9 mi)		

== Stages ==
=== Stage 1 ===
4 February 2026 — Segorbe to Torreblanca, 160 km (99 mi)

Stage 1 Result
Rank	Rider	Team	Time
1	Biniam Girmay (ERI)	NSN Cycling Team	3h 25' 41"
2	Arne Marit (BEL)	Red Bull–Bora–Hansgrohe	+ 0"
3	Giovanni Lonardi (ITA)	Team Polti VisitMalta	+ 0"
4	Carl-Frederik Bévort (DEN)	Uno-X Mobility	+ 0"
5	Aleksandr Vlasov	Red Bull–Bora–Hansgrohe	+ 0"
6	Alberto Bruttomesso (ITA)	Team Bahrain Victorious	+ 0"
7	Tommaso Nencini (ITA)	Solution Tech NIPPO Rali	+ 0"
8	Mikel Retegi (ESP)	Equipo Kern Pharma	+ 0"
9	Dries Van Gestel (BEL)	Soudal–Quick-Step	+ 0"
10	Clément Alleno (FRA)	Burgos Burpellet BH	+ 0"

General classification after Stage 1
Rank	Rider	Team	Time
1	Biniam Girmay (ERI)	NSN Cycling Team	3h 25' 31"
2	Arne Marit (BEL)	Red Bull–Bora–Hansgrohe	+ 4"
3	Giovanni Lonardi (ITA)	Team Polti VisitMalta	+ 6"
4	Mats Wenzel (LUX)	Equipo Kern Pharma	+ 6"
5	Diego Pablo Sevilla (ESP)	Team Polti VisitMalta	+ 6"
6	Danny van der Tuuk (POL)	Euskaltel–Euskadi	+ 7"
7	Remco Evenepoel (BEL)	Red Bull–Bora–Hansgrohe	+ 9"
8	Carl-Frederik Bévort (DEN)	Uno-X Mobility	+ 10"
9	Aleksandr Vlasov	Red Bull–Bora–Hansgrohe	+ 10"
10	Alberto Bruttomesso (ITA)	Team Bahrain Victorious	+ 10"

=== Stage 2 ===
5 February 2026 — Carlet to Alginet, 17 km (11 mi) (ITT)

Stage 2 Result
Rank	Rider	Team	Time
1	Remco Evenepoel (BEL)	Red Bull–Bora–Hansgrohe	20' 12"
2	Aleksandr Vlasov	Red Bull–Bora–Hansgrohe	+ 8"
3	Mathias Vacek (CZE)	Lidl–Trek	+ 16"
4	Ben Turner (GBR)	INEOS Grenadiers	+ 21"
5	Florian Vermeersch (BEL)	UAE Team Emirates XRG	+ 30"
6	Magnus Sheffield (USA)	INEOS Grenadiers	+ 34"
7	Brandon McNulty (USA)	UAE Team Emirates XRG	+ 35"
8	Felix Großschartner (AUT)	UAE Team Emirates XRG	+ 49"
9	Mathias Norsgaard (DEN)	Lidl–Trek	+ 51"
10	Iván Romeo (ESP)	Movistar Team	+ 52"

General classification after Stage 2
Rank	Rider	Team	Time
1	Biniam Girmay (ERI)	NSN Cycling Team	3h 25' 31"
2	Arne Marit (BEL)	Red Bull–Bora–Hansgrohe	+ 4"
3	Giovanni Lonardi (ITA)	Team Polti VisitMalta	+ 6"
4	Mats Wenzel (LUX)	Equipo Kern Pharma	+ 6"
5	Diego Pablo Sevilla (ESP)	Team Polti VisitMalta	+ 6"
6	Danny van der Tuuk (POL)	Euskaltel–Euskadi	+ 7"
7	Remco Evenepoel (BEL)	Red Bull–Bora–Hansgrohe	+ 9"
8	Carl-Frederik Bévort (DEN)	Uno-X Mobility	+ 10"
9	Aleksandr Vlasov	Red Bull–Bora–Hansgrohe	+ 10"
10	Alberto Bruttomesso (ITA)	Team Bahrain Victorious	+ 10"

=== Stage 3 ===
6 February 2026 — Orihuela to San Vicente del Raspeig, 158 km (98 mi)

Stage 3 Result
Rank	Rider	Team	Time
1	Andrew August (USA)	INEOS Grenadiers	3h 20' 54"
2	Ådne Holter (NOR)	Uno-X Mobility	+ 0"
3	Florian Vermeersch (BEL)	UAE Team Emirates XRG	+ 0"
4	Jonathan Vervenne (BEL)	Soudal–Quick-Step	+ 0"
5	Biniam Girmay (ERI)	NSN Cycling Team	+ 4"
6	Ben Turner (GBR)	INEOS Grenadiers	+ 4"
7	Magnus Cort (DEN)	Uno-X Mobility	+ 4"
8	Mathias Vacek (CZE)	Lidl–Trek	+ 4"
9	Mirco Maestri (ITA)	Team Polti VisitMalta	+ 4"
10	Aleksandr Vlasov	Red Bull–Bora–Hansgrohe	+ 4"

General classification after Stage 3
Rank	Rider	Team	Time
1	Biniam Girmay (ERI)	NSN Cycling Team	6h 46' 29"
2	Ådne Holter (NOR)	Uno-X Mobility	+ 0"
3	Florian Vermeersch (BEL)	UAE Team Emirates XRG	+ 2"
4	Mats Wenzel (LUX)	Equipo Kern Pharma	+ 6"
5	Mattia Bais (ITA)	Team Polti VisitMalta	+ 7"
6	Remco Evenepoel (BEL)	Red Bull–Bora–Hansgrohe	+ 9"
7	Aleksandr Vlasov	Red Bull–Bora–Hansgrohe	+ 10"
8	Ben Turner (GBR)	INEOS Grenadiers	+ 10"
9	Mathias Vacek (CZE)	Lidl–Trek	+ 10"
10	Mikel Retegi (ESP)	Equipo Kern Pharma	+ 10"

=== Stage 4 ===
7 February 2026 — La Nucía to Teulada Moraira, 172 km (107 mi)

Stage 4 Result
Rank	Rider	Team	Time
1	Remco Evenepoel (BEL)	Red Bull–Bora–Hansgrohe	4h 14' 01"
2	João Almeida (POR)	UAE Team Emirates XRG	+ 24"
3	Giulio Pellizzari (ITA)	Red Bull–Bora–Hansgrohe	+ 24"
4	Antonio Tiberi (ITA)	Team Bahrain Victorious	+ 24"
5	Brandon McNulty (USA)	UAE Team Emirates XRG	+ 36"
6	Magnus Sheffield (USA)	INEOS Grenadiers	+ 1' 02"
7	Aleksandr Vlasov	Red Bull–Bora–Hansgrohe	+ 1' 48"
8	Ben Turner (GBR)	INEOS Grenadiers	+ 1' 56"
9	Riley Sheehan (USA)	NSN Cycling Team	+ 2' 01"
10	Viktor Soenens (BEL)	Soudal–Quick-Step	+ 2' 03"

General classification after Stage 4
Rank	Rider	Team	Time
1	Remco Evenepoel (BEL)	Red Bull–Bora–Hansgrohe	11h 00' 26"
2	João Almeida (POR)	UAE Team Emirates XRG	+ 31"
3	Giulio Pellizzari (ITA)	Red Bull–Bora–Hansgrohe	+ 34"
4	Antonio Tiberi (ITA)	Team Bahrain Victorious	+ 36"
5	Brandon McNulty (USA)	UAE Team Emirates XRG	+ 50"
6	Magnus Sheffield (USA)	INEOS Grenadiers	+ 1' 16"
7	Aleksandr Vlasov	Red Bull–Bora–Hansgrohe	+ 2' 02"
8	Ben Turner (GBR)	INEOS Grenadiers	+ 2' 10"
9	Riley Sheehan (USA)	NSN Cycling Team	+ 2' 15"
10	Viktor Soenens (BEL)	Soudal–Quick-Step	+ 2' 17"

=== Stage 5 ===
8 February 2026 — Bétera to Valencia, 94.7 km (58.8 mi)

Stage 5 Result
Rank	Rider	Team	Time
1	Raúl García Pierna (ESP)	Movistar Team	2h 09' 44"
2	Emil Herzog (GER)	Red Bull–Bora–Hansgrohe	+ 0"
3	Jasper Schoofs (BEL)	Soudal–Quick-Step	+ 0"
4	Adrià Pericas (ESP)	UAE Team Emirates XRG	+ 0"
5	Sven Erik Bystrøm (NOR)	Uno-X Mobility	+ 0"
6	Diego Uriarte (ESP)	Equipo Kern Pharma	+ 0"
7	Ben Turner (GBR)	INEOS Grenadiers	+ 2"
8	Dries Van Gestel (BEL)	Soudal–Quick-Step	+ 2"
9	Mathias Vacek (CZE)	Lidl–Trek	+ 2"
10	Aleksandr Vlasov	Red Bull–Bora–Hansgrohe	+ 2"

General classification after Stage 5
Rank	Rider	Team	Time
1	Remco Evenepoel (BEL)	Red Bull–Bora–Hansgrohe	13h 10' 12"
2	João Almeida (POR)	UAE Team Emirates XRG	+ 31"
3	Giulio Pellizzari (ITA)	Red Bull–Bora–Hansgrohe	+ 34"
4	Antonio Tiberi (ITA)	Team Bahrain Victorious	+ 36"
5	Brandon McNulty (USA)	UAE Team Emirates XRG	+ 50"
6	Magnus Sheffield (USA)	INEOS Grenadiers	+ 1' 16"
7	Aleksandr Vlasov	Red Bull–Bora–Hansgrohe	+ 2' 02"
8	Ben Turner (GBR)	INEOS Grenadiers	+ 2' 10"
9	Riley Sheehan (USA)	NSN Cycling Team	+ 2' 15"
10	Viktor Soenens (BEL)	Soudal–Quick-Step	+ 2' 17"

== Classification leadership table ==
Classification leadership by stage
Stage	Winner	General classification	Points classification	Mountains classification	Young rider classification	Team classification
1	Biniam Girmay	Biniam Girmay	Biniam Girmay	Danny van der Tuuk	Mats Wenzel	Red Bull–Bora–Hansgrohe
2	Remco Evenepoel	Biniam Girmay	Biniam Girmay	Danny van der Tuuk	Mats Wenzel	Red Bull–Bora–Hansgrohe
3	Andrew August	Biniam Girmay	Biniam Girmay	Danny van der Tuuk	Mats Wenzel	INEOS Grenadiers
4	Remco Evenepoel	Remco Evenepoel	Biniam Girmay	Danny van der Tuuk	Giulio Pellizzari	Red Bull–Bora–Hansgrohe
5	Raúl García Pierna	Remco Evenepoel	Biniam Girmay	Danny van der Tuuk	Giulio Pellizzari	Red Bull–Bora–Hansgrohe
Final		Remco Evenepoel	Biniam Girmay	Danny van der Tuuk	Giulio Pellizzari	Red Bull–Bora–Hansgrohe

== Classification standings ==
Legend
Denotes the winner of the general classification	Denotes the winner of the points classification
Denotes the winner of the mountains classification	Denotes the winner of the young rider classification

=== General classification ===
Final general classification (1–10)
Rank	Rider	Team	Time
1	Remco Evenepoel (BEL)	Red Bull–Bora–Hansgrohe	13h 10' 12"
2	João Almeida (POR)	UAE Team Emirates XRG	+ 31"
3	Giulio Pellizzari (ITA)	Red Bull–Bora–Hansgrohe	+ 34"
4	Antonio Tiberi (ITA)	Team Bahrain Victorious	+ 36"
5	Brandon McNulty (USA)	UAE Team Emirates XRG	+ 50"
6	Magnus Sheffield (USA)	INEOS Grenadiers	+ 1' 16"
7	Aleksandr Vlasov	Red Bull–Bora–Hansgrohe	+ 2' 02"
8	Ben Turner (GBR)	INEOS Grenadiers	+ 2' 10"
9	Riley Sheehan (USA)	NSN Cycling Team	+ 2' 15"
10	Viktor Soenens (BEL)	Soudal–Quick-Step	+ 2' 17"

=== Points classification ===
Final points classification (1–10)
Rank	Rider	Team	Points
1	Biniam Girmay (ERI)	NSN Cycling Team	37
2	Aleksandr Vlasov	Red Bull–Bora–Hansgrohe	33
3	Ben Turner (GBR)	INEOS Grenadiers	32
4	Raúl García Pierna (ESP)	Movistar Team	30
5	Remco Evenepoel (BEL)	Red Bull–Bora–Hansgrohe	30
6	Andrew August (USA)	INEOS Grenadiers	29
7	Ådne Holter (NOR)	Uno-X Mobility	21
8	João Almeida (POR)	UAE Team Emirates XRG	20
9	Emil Herzog (GER)	Red Bull–Bora–Hansgrohe	20
10	Arne Marit (BEL)	Red Bull–Bora–Hansgrohe	20

=== Mountains classification ===
Final mountains classification (1–10)
Rank	Rider	Team	Points
1	Danny van der Tuuk (POL)	Euskaltel–Euskadi	27
2	Julien Bernard (FRA)	Lidl–Trek	17
3	Raúl García Pierna (ESP)	Movistar Team	16
4	Carlos García Pierna (ESP)	Burgos Burpellet BH	16
5	Remco Evenepoel (BEL)	Red Bull–Bora–Hansgrohe	10
6	Antonio Tiberi (ITA)	Team Bahrain Victorious	8
7	Steff Cras (BEL)	Soudal–Quick-Step	8
8	Adrià Pericas (ESP)	UAE Team Emirates XRG	8
9	João Almeida (POR)	UAE Team Emirates XRG	6
10	Magnus Sheffield (USA)	INEOS Grenadiers	4

=== Young rider classification ===
Final young rider classification (1–10)
Rank	Rider	Team	Time
1	Giulio Pellizzari (ITA)	Red Bull–Bora–Hansgrohe	13h 10' 47"
2	Antonio Tiberi (ITA)	Team Bahrain Victorious	+ 2"
3	Magnus Sheffield (USA)	INEOS Grenadiers	+ 42"
4	Viktor Soenens (BEL)	Soudal–Quick-Step	+ 1' 43"
5	Iván Romeo (ESP)	Movistar Team	+ 1' 46"
6	Raúl García Pierna (ESP)	Movistar Team	+ 2' 10"
7	Pablo Castrillo (ESP)	Movistar Team	+ 2' 17"
8	Johannes Kulset (NOR)	Uno-X Mobility	+ 2' 23"
9	Pau Martí (ESP)	NSN Cycling Team	+ 2' 23"
10	Andrii Ponomar (UKR)	Petrolike	+ 2' 32"

=== Teams classification ===
Final teams classification (1–10)
Rank	Team	Time
1	(Germany) Red Bull–Bora–Hansgrohe	39h 33' 31"
2	(United Arab Emirates) UAE Team Emirates XRG	+ 1' 04"
3	(Spain) Movistar Team	+ 5' 23"
4	(Belgium) Soudal–Quick-Step	+ 8' 07"
5	Team Bahrain Victorious	+ 10' 13"
6	(Switzerland) NSN Cycling Team	+ 10' 20"
7	(United Kingdom) INEOS Grenadiers	+ 10 '37"
8	(Spain) Burgos Burpellet BH	+ 11' 04"
9	(Germany) Lidl–Trek	+ 12' 36"
10	(Norway) Uno-X Mobility	+ 13' 02"
