= 2025 O Gran Camiño =

Spanish cycling race

2025 UCI Europe Tour

Race details
- Dates: 26 February – 2 March 2025
- Stages: 5
- Distance: 635.37 km (394.8 mi)
- Winning time: 15h 21' 23"

Results
Jersey awarded to the overall winner	Winner	Derek Gee (CAN)	(Israel–Premier Tech)
	Second	Davide Piganzoli (ITA)	(Team Polti VisitMalta)
	Third	Magnus Cort (DEN)	(Uno-X Mobility)
Jersey awarded to the points classification winner	Points	Magnus Cort (DEN)	(Uno-X Mobility)
Jersey awarded to the mountains classification winner	Mountains	Derek Gee (CAN)	(Israel–Premier Tech)
Jersey awarded to the youth classification winner	Youth	Viktor Soenens (BEL)	(Soudal–Quick-Step)
	Team	(Spain) Burgos Burpellet BH	

The 2025 O Gran Camiño (English: The Great Way) was a road cycling stage race that took place from 26 February to 2 March 2025 in the autonomous community of Galicia in northwestern Spain. The race was rated as a category 2.1 event on the 2025 UCI Europe Tour calendar and was the fourth edition of the O Gran Camiño.

== Teams ==
Three UCI WorldTeams, eight UCI ProTeams, and seven UCI Continental teams made up the 18 teams that participated in the race.

UCI WorldTeams

- Groupama–FDJ
- Movistar Team
- Soudal–Quick-Step

UCI ProTeams

- Burgos Burpellet BH
- Caja Rural–Seguros RGA
- Equipo Kern Pharma
- Euskaltel–Euskadi
- Israel–Premier Tech
- Team Polti VisitMalta
- Uno-X Mobility
- VF Group–Bardiani–CSF–Faizanè

UCI Continental Teams

- Anicolor / Tien 21
- AP Hotels & Resorts / Tavira / SC Farense
- Efapel Cycling
- Illes Balears Arabay
- Petrolike
- Rádio Popular–Paredes–Boavista
- Tavfer–Ovos Matinados–Mortágua

== Route ==
Stage characteristics and winners
Stage	Date	Course	Distance	Type	Stage winner
1	26 February	Maia to Matosinhos (Portugal)	189.7 km (117.9 mi)	Hilly stage	Magnus Cort (DEN)
2	27 February	Marín to A Estrada	133.1 km (82.7 mi)	Hilly stage	Magnus Cort (DEN)
3	28 February	Ourense to O Pereiro de Aguiar	15.6 km (9.7 mi)	Individual time trial	Derek Gee (CAN)
4	1 March	A Pobra do Brollón to O Cebreiro	137.1 km (85.2 mi)	Mountain stage	Sergio Chumil (GUA)
5	2 March	Betanzos to Santiago de Compostela	159.87 km (99.34 mi)	Hilly stage	Magnus Cort (DEN)
Total			635.37 km (394.80 mi)		

== Stages ==
=== Stage 1 ===
26 February 2025 — Maia to Matosinhos (Portugal), 189.7 km (117.9 mi)

Stage 1 Result (1–10)
Rank	Rider	Team	Time
1	Magnus Cort (DEN)	Uno-X Mobility	4h 18' 49"
2	Santiago Mesa (COL)	Efapel Cycling	+ 0"
3	Giovanni Lonardi (ITA)	Team Polti VisitMalta	+ 0"
4	Daniel Cavia (ESP)	Burgos Burpellet BH	+ 0"
5	Jordi Warlop (BEL)	Soudal–Quick-Step	+ 0"
6	Francisco Joel Peñuela (VEN)	Caja Rural–Seguros RGA	+ 0"
7	Cesar Macias (MEX)	Petrolike	+ 0"
8	Carlos Canal (ESP)	Movistar Team	+ 0"
9	Jose Juan Prieto (MEX)	Petrolike	+ 0"
10	Filippo Magli (ITA)	VF Group–Bardiani–CSF–Faizanè	+ 0"

General classification after Stage 1 (1–10)
Rank	Rider	Team	Time
1	Magnus Cort (DEN)	Uno-X Mobility	4h 18' 39"
2	Santiago Mesa (COL)	Efapel Cycling	+ 4"
3	Ander Okamika (ESP)	Burgos Burpellet BH	+ 5"
4	Giovanni Lonardi (ITA)	Team Polti VisitMalta	+ 6"
5	Filippo Turconi (ITA)	VF Group–Bardiani–CSF–Faizanè	+ 7"
6	Daniel Cavia (ESP)	Burgos Burpellet BH	+ 10"
7	Jordi Warlop (BEL)	Soudal–Quick-Step	+ 10"
8	Francisco Joel Peñuela (VEN)	Caja Rural–Seguros RGA	+ 10"
9	Cesar Macias (MEX)	Petrolike	+ 10"
10	Carlos Canal (ESP)	Movistar Team	+ 10"

=== Stage 2 ===
27 February 2025 — Marín to A Estrada, 133.1 km (82.7 mi)

Stage 2 Result (1–10)
Rank	Rider	Team	Time
1	Magnus Cort (DEN)	Uno-X Mobility	3h 13' 05"
2	Martin Marcellusi (ITA)	VF Group–Bardiani–CSF–Faizanè	+ 0"
3	Carlos Canal (ESP)	Movistar Team	+ 0"
4	Thomas Pesenti (ITA)	Soudal–Quick-Step	+ 0"
5	Iván Cobo (ESP)	Equipo Kern Pharma	+ 0"
6	Eric Antonio Fagúndez (URU)	Burgos Burpellet BH	+ 0"
7	Rémy Rochas (FRA)	Groupama–FDJ	+ 0"
8	Davide Piganzoli (ITA)	Team Polti VisitMalta	+ 0"
9	Sergio Chumil (GUA)	Burgos Burpellet BH	+ 0"
10	Derek Gee (CAN)	Israel–Premier Tech	+ 0"

General classification after Stage 2 (1–10)
Rank	Rider	Team	Time
1	Magnus Cort (DEN)	Uno-X Mobility	7h 31' 34"
2	Martin Marcellusi (ITA)	VF Group–Bardiani–CSF–Faizanè	+ 14"
3	Carlos Canal (ESP)	Movistar Team	+ 16"
4	Thomas Pesenti (ITA)	Soudal–Quick-Step	+ 20"
5	Eric Antonio Fagúndez (URU)	Burgos Burpellet BH	+ 20"
6	Iván Cobo (ESP)	Equipo Kern Pharma	+ 20"
7	Rémy Rochas (FRA)	Groupama–FDJ	+ 20"
8	Samuel Fernández (ESP)	Caja Rural–Seguros RGA	+ 20"
9	Derek Gee (CAN)	Israel–Premier Tech	+ 20"
10	Davide Piganzoli (ITA)	Team Polti VisitMalta	+ 20"

=== Stage 3 ===
28 February 2025 — Ourense to O Pereiro de Aguiar, 15.6 km (9.7 mi) (ITT)

Stage 3 Result (1–10)
Rank	Rider	Team	Time
1	Derek Gee (CAN)	Israel–Premier Tech	23' 17"
2	Davide Piganzoli (ITA)	Team Polti VisitMalta	+ 17"
3	Maxime Decomble (FRA)	Groupama–FDJ	+ 21"
4	Magnus Cort (DEN)	Uno-X Mobility	+ 25"
5	Iván Cobo (ESP)	Equipo Kern Pharma	+ 27"
6	Txomin Juaristi (ESP)	Euskaltel–Euskadi	+ 33"
7	Urko Berrade (ESP)	Equipo Kern Pharma	+ 35"
8	Fredrik Dversnes (NOR)	Uno-X Mobility	+ 38"
9	Hugo Houle (CAN)	Israel–Premier Tech	+ 44"
10	Alex Molenaar (NED)	Caja Rural–Seguros RGA	+ 45"

General classification after Stage 3 (1–10)
Rank	Rider	Team	Time
1	Derek Gee (CAN)	Israel–Premier Tech	7h 55' 11"
2	Magnus Cort (DEN)	Uno-X Mobility	+ 5"
3	Davide Piganzoli (ITA)	Team Polti VisitMalta	+ 17"
4	Iván Cobo (ESP)	Equipo Kern Pharma	+ 27"
5	Maxime Decomble (FRA)	Groupama–FDJ	+ 39"
6	Txomin Juaristi (ESP)	Euskaltel–Euskadi	+ 40"
7	Eric Antonio Fagúndez (URU)	Burgos Burpellet BH	+ 46"
8	Nelson Oliveira (POR)	Movistar Team	+ 47"
9	Abel Balderstone (ESP)	Caja Rural–Seguros RGA	+ 51"
10	Fredrik Dversnes (NOR)	Uno-X Mobility	+ 59"

=== Stage 4 ===
1 March 2025 — A Pobra do Brollón to O Cebreiro, 137.1 km (85.2 mi)

Stage 4 Result (1–10)
Rank	Rider	Team	Time
1	Sergio Chumil (GUA)	Burgos Burpellet BH	3h 42' 27"
2	Derek Gee (CAN)	Israel–Premier Tech	+ 0"
3	Davide Piganzoli (ITA)	Team Polti VisitMalta	+ 18"
4	Jefferson Alveiro Cepeda (ECU)	Movistar Team	+ 19"
5	Jesús David Peña (COL)	AP Hotels & Resorts / Tavira / SC Farense	+ 41"
6	Magnus Cort (DEN)	Uno-X Mobility	+ 41"
7	Eric Antonio Fagúndez (URU)	Burgos Burpellet BH	+ 41"
8	Jonathan Klever Caicedo (ECU)	Petrolike	+ 41"
9	Viktor Soenens (BEL)	Soudal–Quick-Step	+ 41"
10	Mauri Vansevenant (BEL)	Soudal–Quick-Step	+ 41"

General classification after Stage 4 (1–10)
Rank	Rider	Team	Time
1	Derek Gee (CAN)	Israel–Premier Tech	11h 37' 32"
2	Davide Piganzoli (ITA)	Team Polti VisitMalta	+ 37"
3	Magnus Cort (DEN)	Uno-X Mobility	+ 49"
4	Iván Cobo (ESP)	Equipo Kern Pharma	+ 1' 14"
5	Eric Antonio Fagúndez (URU)	Burgos Burpellet BH	+ 1' 33"
6	Jefferson Alveiro Cepeda (ECU)	Movistar Team	+ 1' 48"
7	Viktor Soenens (BEL)	Soudal–Quick-Step	+ 1' 51"
8	Sergio Chumil (GUA)	Burgos Burpellet BH	+ 1' 52"
9	Mauri Vansevenant (BEL)	Soudal–Quick-Step	+ 2' 01"
10	Johannes Kulset (NOR)	Uno-X Mobility	+ 2' 14"

=== Stage 5 ===
2 March 2025 — Betanzos to Santiago de Compostela, 159.87 km (99.34 mi)

Stage 5 Result (1–10)
Rank	Rider	Team	Time
1	Magnus Cort (DEN)	Uno-X Mobility	3h 43' 52"
2	Carlos Canal (ESP)	Movistar Team	+ 0"
3	Giovanni Lonardi (ITA)	Team Polti VisitMalta	+ 0"
4	Cesar Macias (MEX)	Petrolike	+ 0"
5	Mirco Maestri (ITA)	Team Polti VisitMalta	+ 0"
6	Xavier Cañellas (ESP)	Anicolor / Tien 21	+ 0"
7	Davide Piganzoli (ITA)	Team Polti VisitMalta	+ 0"
8	Francisco Peñuela (VEN)	Caja Rural–Seguros RGA	+ 0"
9	José Antonio Prieto (MEX)	Petrolike	+ 0"
10	Thomas Pesenti (ITA)	Soudal–Quick-Step	+ 0"

General classification after Stage 5 (1–10)
Rank	Rider	Team	Time
1	Derek Gee (CAN)	Israel–Premier Tech	15h 21' 23"
2	Davide Piganzoli (ITA)	Team Polti VisitMalta	+ 35"
3	Magnus Cort (DEN)	Uno-X Mobility	+ 38"
4	Iván Cobo (ESP)	Equipo Kern Pharma	+ 1' 15"
5	Eric Antonio Fagúndez (URU)	Burgos Burpellet BH	+ 1' 34"
6	Sergio Chumil (GUA)	Burgos Burpellet BH	+ 1' 53"
7	Jefferson Alveiro Cepeda (ECU)	Movistar Team	+ 1' 56"
8	Viktor Soenens (BEL)	Soudal–Quick-Step	+ 1' 59"
9	Mauri Vansevenant (BEL)	Soudal–Quick-Step	+ 2' 02"
10	Johannes Kulset (NOR)	Uno-X Mobility	+ 2' 22"

== Classification leadership table ==
Classification leadership by stage
Stage	Winner	General classification	Points classification	Mountains classification	Young rider classification	Team classification	Combativity award
1	Magnus Cort	Magnus Cort	Magnus Cort	Ander Okamika	Filippo Turconi	Burgos Burpellet BH	Ander Okamika
2	Magnus Cort	Magnus Cort	Magnus Cort	Ander Okamika	Samuel Fernández	Uno-X Mobility	Iván Cobo
3	Derek Gee	Derek Gee	Magnus Cort	Ander Okamika	Maxime Decomble	Uno-X Mobility	Not awarded
4	Sergio Chumil	Derek Gee	Magnus Cort	Derek Gee	Viktor Soenens	Burgos Burpellet BH	Mauri Vansevenant
5	Magnus Cort	Derek Gee	Magnus Cort	Derek Gee	Viktor Soenens	Burgos Burpellet BH	Martin Marcellusi
Final		Derek Gee	Magnus Cort	Derek Gee	Viktor Soenens	Burgos Burpellet BH	Not awarded

== Final classification standings ==
Legend
Denotes the winner of the general classification	Denotes the winner of the mountains classification
Denotes the winner of the points classification	Denotes the winner of the young rider classification

=== General classification ===
Final general classification (1–10)
Rank	Rider	Team	Time
1	Derek Gee (CAN)	Israel–Premier Tech	15h 21' 23"
2	Davide Piganzoli (ITA)	Team Polti VisitMalta	+ 35"
3	Magnus Cort (DEN)	Uno-X Mobility	+ 38"
4	Iván Cobo (ESP)	Equipo Kern Pharma	+ 1' 15"
5	Eric Antonio Fagúndez (URU)	Burgos Burpellet BH	+ 1' 34"
6	Sergio Chumil (GUA)	Burgos Burpellet BH	+ 1' 53"
7	Jefferson Alveiro Cepeda (ECU)	Movistar Team	+ 1' 56"
8	Viktor Soenens (BEL)	Soudal–Quick-Step	+ 1' 59"
9	Mauri Vansevenant (BEL)	Soudal–Quick-Step	+ 2' 02"
10	Johannes Kulset (NOR)	Uno-X Mobility	+ 2' 22"

=== Points classification ===
Final points classification (1–10)
Rank	Rider	Team	Points
1	Magnus Cort (DEN)	Uno-X Mobility	132
2	Davide Piganzoli (ITA)	Team Polti VisitMalta	76
3	Derek Gee (CAN)	Israel–Premier Tech	63
4	Carlos Canal (ESP)	Movistar Team	54
5	Giovanni Lonardi (ITA)	Team Polti VisitMalta	44
6	Sergio Chumil (GUA)	Burgos Burpellet BH	41
7	Iván Cobo (ESP)	Equipo Kern Pharma	40
8	Eric Antonio Fagúndez (URU)	Burgos Burpellet BH	38
9	Cesar Macias (MEX)	Petrolike	32
10	Thomas Pesenti (ITA)	Soudal–Quick-Step	28

=== Mountains classification ===
Final mountains classification (1–10)
Rank	Rider	Team	Points
1	Derek Gee (CAN)	Israel–Premier Tech	17
2	Ander Okamika (ESP)	Burgos Burpellet BH	12
3	Sergio Chumil (GUA)	Burgos Burpellet BH	9
4	Josh Burnett (NZL)	Burgos Burpellet BH	8
5	Davide Piganzoli (ITA)	Team Polti VisitMalta	8
6	Jefferson Alveiro Cepeda (ECU)	Movistar Team	4
7	Rémy Rochas (FRA)	Groupama–FDJ	3
8	Matteo Scalco (ITA)	VF Group–Bardiani–CSF–Faizanè	3
9	Martin Marcellusi (ITA)	VF Group–Bardiani–CSF–Faizanè	3
10	Filippo Turconi (ITA)	VF Group–Bardiani–CSF–Faizanè	3

=== Young rider classification ===
Final young rider classification (1–10)
Rank	Rider	Team	Time
1	Viktor Soenens (BEL)	Soudal–Quick-Step	15h 23' 22"
2	Johannes Kulset (NOR)	Uno-X Mobility	+ 23"
3	Maxime Decomble (FRA)	Groupama–FDJ	+ 1' 06"
4	Luca Paletti (ITA)	VF Group–Bardiani–CSF–Faizanè	+ 1' 24"
5	Samuel Fernández (ESP)	Caja Rural–Seguros RGA	+ 2' 44"
6	Simon Dalby (DEN)	Uno-X Mobility	+ 3' 37"
7	Lucas Lopes (POR)	Rádio Popular–Paredes–Boavista	+ 10' 24"
8	Diego Pescador (ESP)	Movistar Team	+ 12' 42"
9	Rémi Daumas (FRA)	Groupama–FDJ	+ 18' 58"
10	Matteo Scalco (ITA)	VF Group–Bardiani–CSF–Faizanè	+ 19' 17"

=== Teams classification ===
Final team classification (1–10)
Rank	Team	Time
1	Burgos Burpellet BH	46h 10' 23"
2	Uno-X Mobility	+ 58"
3	Soudal–Quick-Step	+ 3' 43"
4	Movistar Team	+ 7' 32"
5	Equipo Kern Pharma	+ 8' 46"
6	Groupama–FDJ	+ 9' 09"
7	Israel–Premier Tech	+ 10' 24"
8	Euskaltel–Euskadi	+ 11' 13"
9	VF Group–Bardiani–CSF–Faizanè	+ 11' 31"
10	Caja Rural–Seguros RGA	+ 12' 28"
