= Jamie Meehan =

Irish cyclist

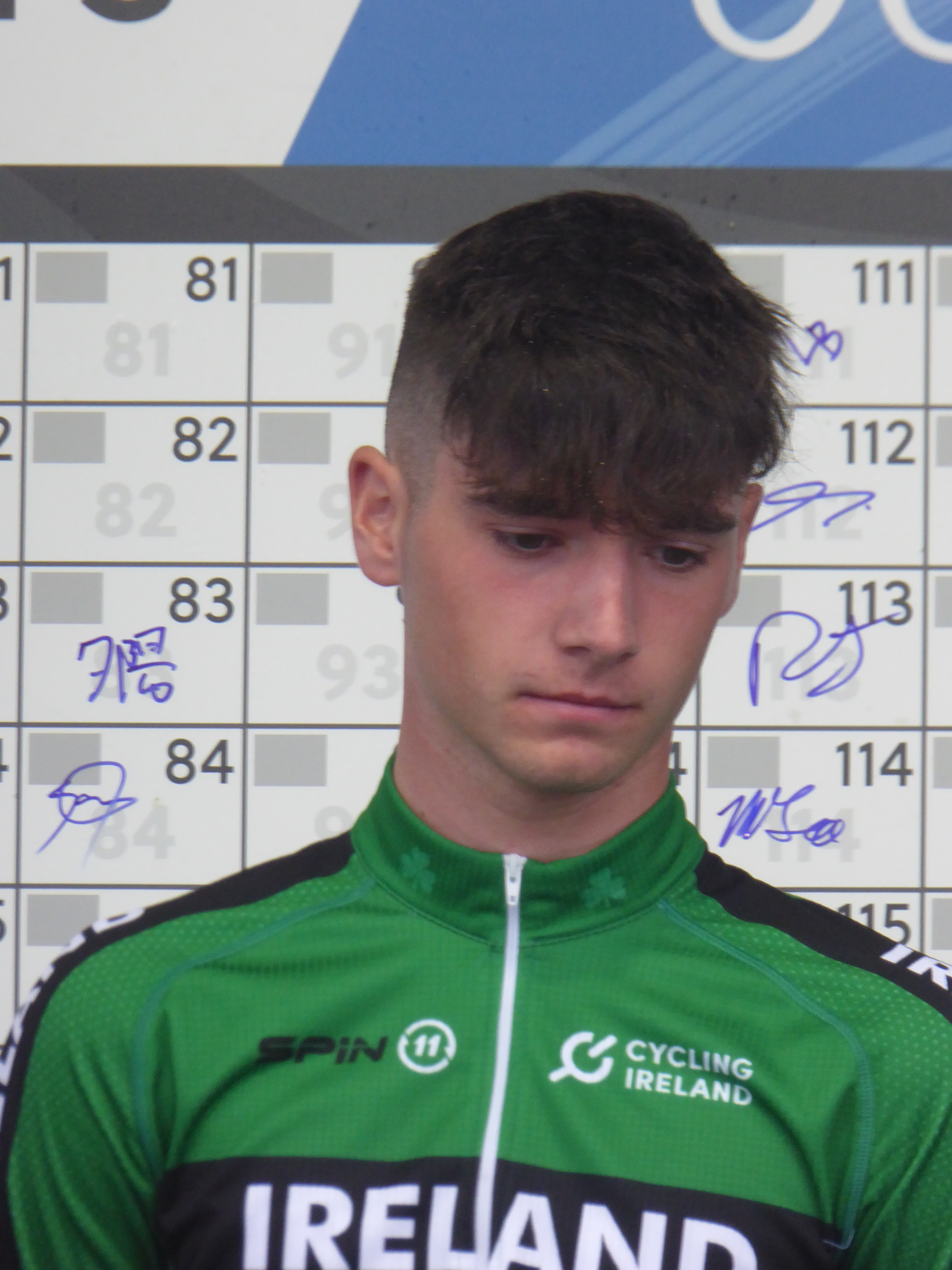
- Meehan in 2023

Personal information
- Born: 6 September 2003 (age 23) Mountcharles, Ireland

Cycling career
- Sport: Cycling
- Current team: Cofidis
- Discipline: Road
- Role: Rider

Amateur teams
- 2021: VC Glendale
- 2022–2023: Spellman Dublin Port
- 2023: Brocar–Alé
- 2024: CC Étupes

Professional teams
- 2025: AVC Aix Provence Dole
- 2025–: Cofidis

Jamie Meehan (born 6 September 2003) is an Irish professional racing cyclist, who currently rides for UCI WorldTeam Cofidis.

Meehan initially joined Cofidis as a stagiaire in August 2025, but was promoted to a full contract on August 15 after finishing third on stage two of the Tour de l'Ain.

== Major results ==
2021
3rd Road race, National Junior Road Championships
2023
1st Road race, National Under-23 Road Championships
2025
1st Road race, National Under-23 Road Championships
1st Trophée Souvenir Roger Walkowiak
2nd Overall Rás Tailteann

1st Young rider classification

6th Overall Giro della Valle d'Aosta
2026
4th Overall Okolo Slovenska
5th Classic Grand Besançon Doubs
9th Tour du Jura
