= Michele Gaia =

Italian cyclist

Personal information
- Born: 27 August 1985 (age 41) Brescia, Italy

Cycling career
- Sport: Cycling
- Discipline: Road
- Role: Rider

Amateur teams
- 2006-2008: UC Bergamasca 1902
- 2008: Barloworld (stagiaire)

Professional teams
- 2009-2010: CSF Group-Navigare
- 2011: Miche-Guerciotti

Michele Gaia (born 27 August 1985 in Brescia) is a former Italian racing cyclist.

== Palmares ==
2003
2nd Tre Ciclistica Bresciana
2007
2nd U23 National Road Race Championships
2008
1st Giro della Valle d'Aosta
