= Tour de l'Ain =

French bicycle race

- 2026 Tour de l'Ain

Race details
- Date: May
- Region: France
- English name: Tour of the Ain; Race of Friendship
- Local name(s): Tour de l'Ain; Prix de l'Amitié
- Discipline: Road
- Competition: UCI Europe Tour 2.1
- Type: Stage race
- Organiser: Alpes Vélo
- Web site: www.tourdelain.com

History
- First edition: 1989
- Editions: 38 (as of 2026)
- First winner: Serge Pires Leal (FRA)
- Most wins: Denis Celle (FRA); Thibaut Pinot (FRA); Michael Storer (AUS) (2 wins each)
- Most recent: Markel Beloki (ESP)

Tour de l'Ain, also known as the Prix de l'Amitié, is an annual professional cycling stage race held in eastern France.

== G.P. de l'Amitié ==
The first edition of the race was in 1970, as the G.P. de l'Amitié (Friendship G.P.). It was held over four or five days in early September and served as a preparation for the Tour de l'Avenir, thus attracting also international riders, especially the Spanish team. The course ran straight across the French Alpes, starting in Nice, on the Côte d'Azur, and finishing in Bourg-en-Bresse, the capital of the Bresse region, north of Lyon, at the base of the Jura mountain range. Main difficulty was the mountain finish on Les Orres. In uneven years the course was reversed: from Bourg to Nice. As the Tour de l'Avenir threatened to be cancelled in 1976, the G.P. de l'Amitié jumped in and served as replacement, expanding the race to nine days. The execution of this event strained the organisation so much that it had to back down. From 1978 onwards the race merely had a national field of participants and was conducted only in the Provence Alpes, starting and finishing in Nice, still with the mountain finish on Les Orres. The organisation recovered however, and opened their race to professionals in 1986. A lot of French riders used this tough race – from Nice, via Valloire (over the Galibier), to Combloux – as a preparation for the Tour de l'Avenir.

== Tour de l'Ain ==
In 1989 new organizers came, Dante Lavacca, Armand Peracca, and Maurice Josserand. They took the race back to its roots, to Bourg-en-Bresse, and changed its name into Tour de l'Ain. From 1989 to 1992 it was an amateur event. In 1993 it became open to professionals. In 1999 Cyclisme Organisation took over the organizing of the event and in the 1999 edition for the first time the climb of the Grand Colombier was included.

The race had a 2.5 UCI (pro-am) status but was in 2002 promoted to the professional 2.3 category.

Since the inception of the UCI ProTour and the UCI Continental circuits in 2005, the race has been classed into category 2.1 (in which all former 2.1, 2.2 and 2.3 races were combined). The race, which travels through the Ain departement into the Jura Mountains, combines both sprinting and mountainous stages. The 1,534 metre high Grand Colombier has featured as a decisive climb in the stage race. The 2018 version consisted of three stages; while previous versions of the event contained four or five stages (including prologues).

== Winners ==
Year	Country	Rider	Team
1972	France	Antoine Gutierrez	
1973	France	Richard Pianaro	
1974	Spain	Enrique Martinez Heredia	
1975	Spain	Angel Lopez del Alamo	
1976	Sweden	Sven-Åke Nilsson	
1977	France	Joël Millard	
1978	France	Michel Charlier	
1979	France	Vincent Lavenu	
1980	France	Gilles Mas	
1981	France	Daniel André	
1982	France	Bernard Faussurier	
1983	France	Denis Celle	
1984	France	Denis Celle	
1985	Poland	Sylvain Oswarek	
1986	France	Patrice Esnault	Kas
1987	France	Laurent Biondi	Système U
1988	France	Mauro Ribeiro	RMO
1989	France	Serge Pires Leal	
1990	France	Denis Moretti	
1991	France	Eric Drubay	
1992	France	Denis Leproux	
1993	France	Emmanuel Magnien	Castorama
1994	France	Lylian Lebreton	Aubervilliers 93–Peugeot
1995	France	Emmanuel Hubert	Le Groupement
1996	France	David Delrieu	Mutuelle de Seine-et-Marne
1997	United States	Bobby Julich	Cofidis
1998	Italy	Cristian Gasperoni	Amore & Vita-Forzacore
1999	Poland	Grzegorz Gwiazdowski	Cofidis
2000	Kazakhstan	Serguei Yakovlev	Besson Chaussures
2001	Bulgaria	Ivaïlo Gabrovski	Jean Delatour
2002	France	Christophe Oriol	AG2R Prévoyance
2003	Belgium	Axel Merckx	Lotto–Domo
2004	France	Jérôme Pineau	Brioches La Boulangère
2005	France	Carl Naibo	Bretagne-Jean Floc'h
2006	France	Cyril Dessel	AG2R Prévoyance
2007	France	John Gadret	AG2R Prévoyance
2008	Germany	Linus Gerdemann	Team Columbia
2009	Estonia	Rein Taaramäe	Cofidis
2010	Spain	Haimar Zubeldia	Team RadioShack
2011	France	David Moncoutié	Cofidis
2012	United States	Andrew Talansky	Garmin–Sharp
2013	France	Romain Bardet	Ag2r–La Mondiale
2014	Netherlands	Bert-Jan Lindeman	Rabobank Development Team
2015	France	Alexandre Geniez	FDJ
2016	Netherlands	Sam Oomen	Team Giant–Alpecin
2017	France	Thibaut Pinot	FDJ
2018	France	Arthur Vichot	Groupama–FDJ
2019	France	Thibaut Pinot	Groupama–FDJ
2020	Slovenia	Primož Roglič	Team Jumbo–Visma
2021	Australia	Michael Storer	Team DSM
2022	France	Guillaume Martin	Cofidis
2023	Australia	Michael Storer	Groupama–FDJ
2024	Ecuador	Jefferson Alexander Cepeda	EF Education–EasyPost
2025	Belgium	Cian Uijtdebroeks	Visma–Lease a Bike
2026	Spain	Markel Beloki	EF Education–EasyPost
