= Yaël Joalland =

French cyclist

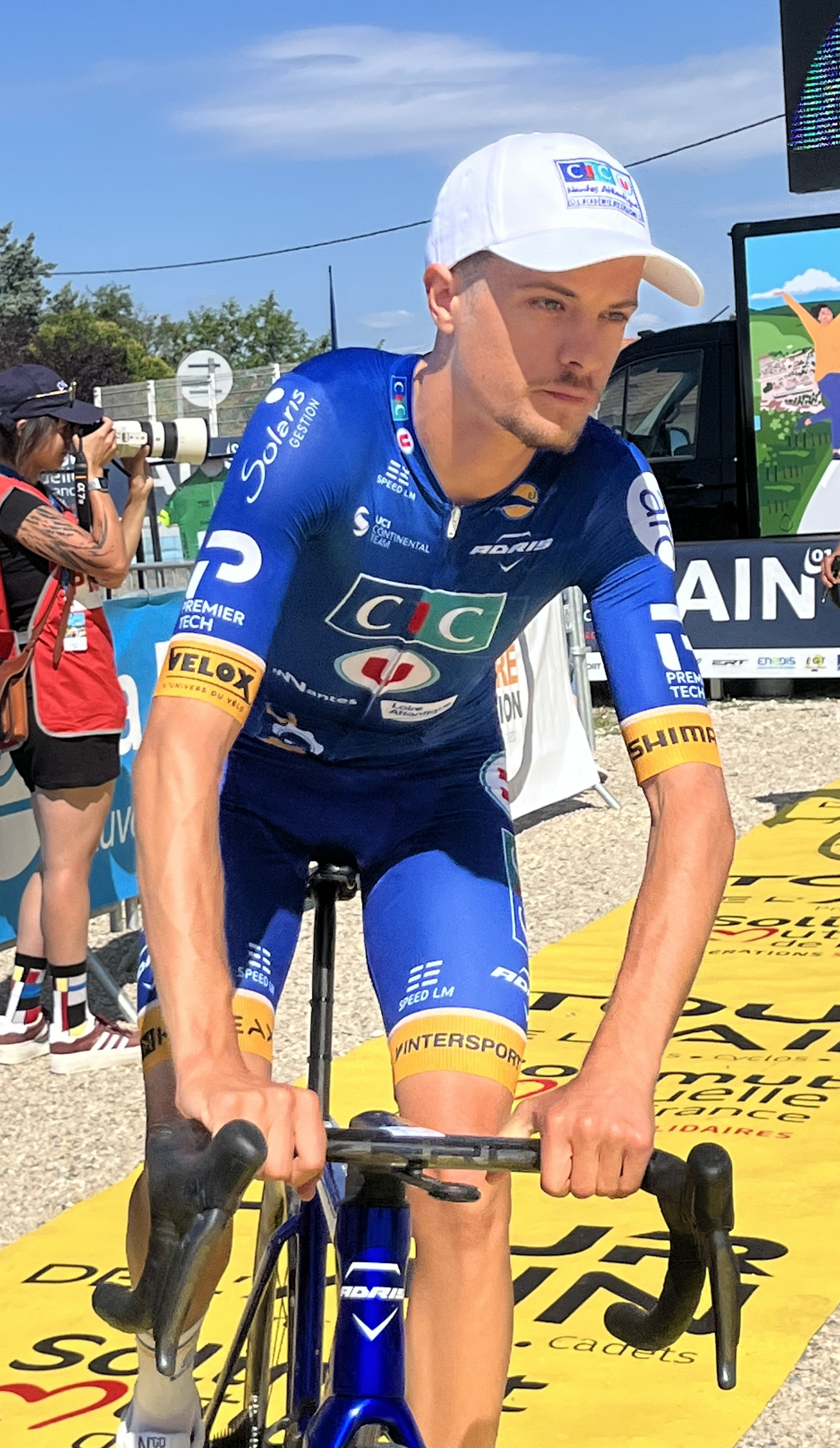
- Joalland at the 2023 Tour de l'Ain

Personal information
- Born: 20 September 2000 (age 26) Saint-Nazaire, France
- Height: 1.74 m (5 ft 9 in)
- Weight: 58 kg (128 lb)

Cycling career
- Sport: Cycling
- Current team: Cofidis
- Discipline: Road
- Role: Rider
- Rider type: Climber

Amateur teams
- 2017–2018: US Pontchâtelaine
- 2019: VC Pays de Loudéac
- 2020–2021: CC Étupes

Professional teams
- 2022–2025: Team UC Nantes Atlantique
- 2026–: Cofidis

Yaël Joalland (born 20 September 2000) is a French cyclist, who currently rides for UCI ProTeam Cofidis.

== Major results ==
2020
10th Overall Ronde de l'Isard
2021
6th Overall Ronde de l'Isard
2023
5th Overall Alpes Isère Tour
2025
7th Overall Route d'Occitanie
