= Viktor Soenens =

Belgian cyclist

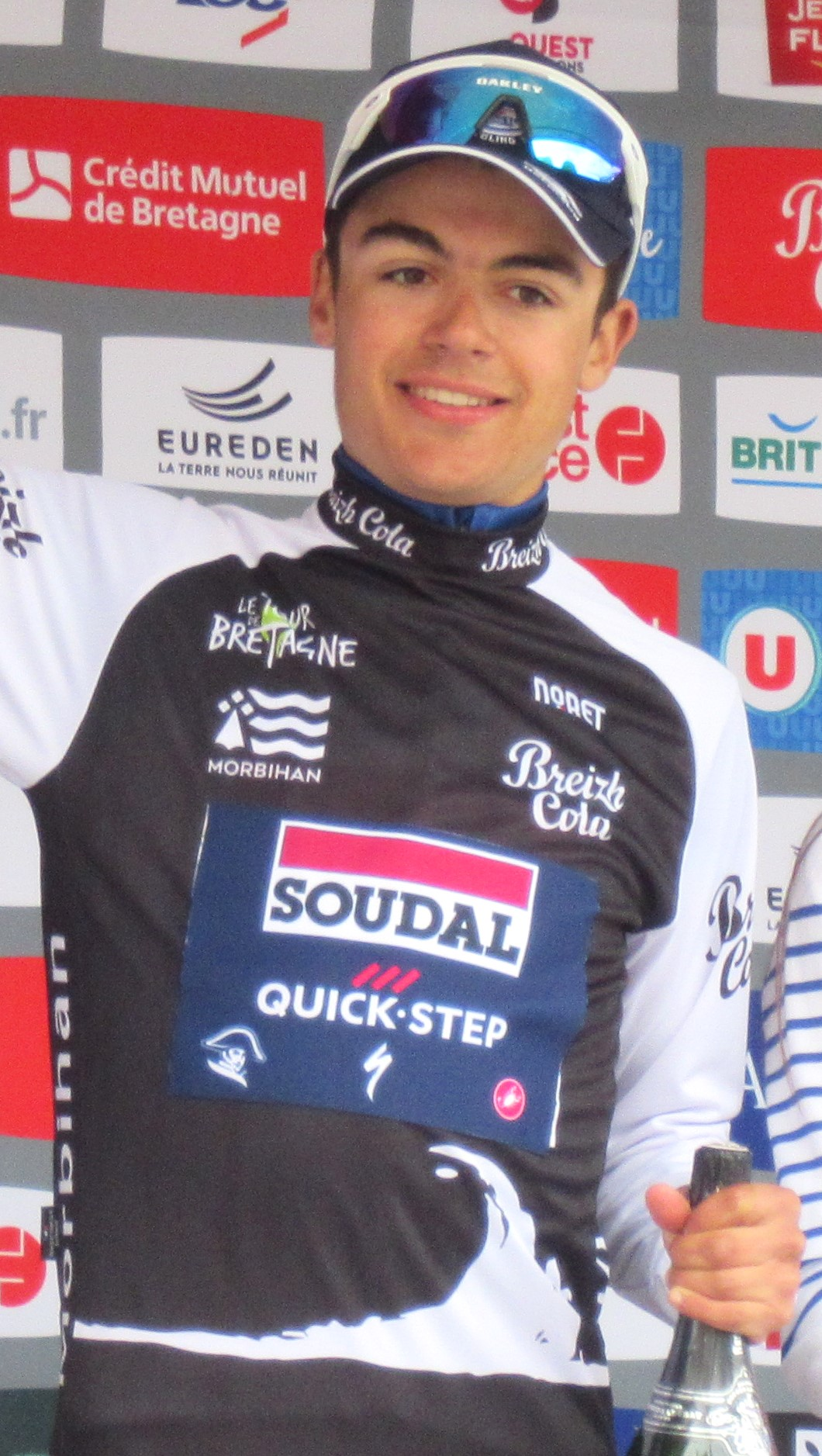
- Soenens in 2024

Personal information
- Born: 5 October 2005 (age 21) Aalter, Belgium
- Height: 1.80 m (5 ft 11 in)

Cycling career
- Sport: Cycling
- Current team: Soudal–Quick-Step Devo Team
- Discipline: Road
- Role: Rider

Amateur team
- 2022–2023: Onder Ons Parike

Professional team
- 2024–: Soudal–Quick-Step Devo Team

Viktor Soenens (born 5 October 2005) is a Belgian professional racing cyclist, who currently rides for UCI Continental team Soudal–Quick-Step Devo Team.

== Major results ==
2022
1st GP Phalempin
3rd Challenge Wallonie-Picare Vezon
4th GP Ernest Beco
5th Liège–Bastogne–Liège Juniors
5th Gistel
7th Tombroek Koerse-Rollegem
8th GP Sélection Meubles
8th Course de côte Herbeumont Juniors
9th E3 Saxo Bank Classic Juniors
2023
2nd Overall Trixxo Ster van Zuid-Limburg

1st Stage 4

3rd Gistel
4th Overall Aubel–Thimister–Stavelot
4th Overall La Philippe Gilbert Juniors
4th E3 Saxo Bank Classic Juniors
6th Tour of Flanders Juniors
6th Arend der Junioren Rekkem
7th De Klijte-Heuvelland
7th Deinze Nevele
7th GP Ernest Beco
7th Heestert
7th De Klijte
8th Honnelles-Angreau
9th Overall Triptyque Ardennais Juniors
9th Varsenare
2024
1st Grand Prix de Honnelles
2nd Ronde van Limburg
4th Overall Tour de Bretagne

1st Young rider classification

4th Oost-Vlaamse Sluitingsprijs
5th Coppa Città di San Daniele
7th GP Vermarc
10th Piccolo Giro di Lombardia
2025
7th Liège–Bastogne–Liège Espoirs
8th Overall O Gran Camiño

1st Young rider classification

2026
10th Overall Volta a la Comunitat Valenciana
