= Henrique Bravo =

Brazilian cyclist

Personal information
- Full name: Henrique Ribeiro Bravo
- Born: 20 April 2006 (age 20) Nova Lima, Brazil
- Height: 1.72 m (5 ft 8 in)
- Weight: 51 kg (112 lb)

Cycling career
- Sport: Cycling
- Current team: Soudal–Quick-Step Devo Team
- Disciplines: Road; Mountain
- Role: Rider
- Rider type: Climber

Amateur team
- 2024: Picusa Academy

Professional teams
- 2024–2025: Specialized Racing BR (MTB)
- 2025–: Soudal–Quick-Step Devo Team

Henrique Ribeiro Bravo (born 20 April 2006) is a Brazilian professional racing cyclist, who currently rides for UCI Continental team Soudal–Quick-Step Devo Team.

== Career ==
Bravo initially specialized in mountain biking, having been inspired by Henrique Avancini. In 2024, he started competing in road races in Europe, winning the Vuelta Junior a la Ribera del Duero. He also had a successful mountain bike season, winning the Brazilian national championships, finishing second in the Pan American championships and thirteenth in the UCI Cross-Country World Championships, all in the junior category.

He signed with Soudal–Quick-Step Devo Team in 2025, placing in the top ten overall in the Tour Alsace and Giro della Valle d'Aosta. Bravo took his first professional win in February 2026 on stage 7 of the Tour du Rwanda, going on to place 6th overall. The following month, he won the Tour of Antalya in Turkey, followed by the Oberösterreich Rundfahrt in June.

== Major results ==
=== Road ===
2024
1st Overall Vuelta Junior a la Ribera del Duero

1st Stage 2

National Junior Championships

2nd Time trial
3rd Road race

2025
5th Time trial, National Championships
7th Overall Tour Alsace
8th Overall Giro della Valle d'Aosta
2026 (1 pro win)
1st Overall Tour of Antalya

1st Young rider classification
1st Stage 3

1st Overall Oberösterreich Rundfahrt

1st Young rider classification
1st Stage 1

1st Overall Giro della Valle d'Aosta

1st Stage 1 (ITT)

2nd Overall Okolo Slovenska

1st Young rider classification

3rd Overall Giro d'Italia Next Gen
4th Overall Tour de l'Ain
5th Overall Tour de l'Avenir
6th Overall Tour du Rwanda

1st Stage 7

7th Overall Circuit des Ardennes

1st Young rider classification

=== Mountain bike ===
2024
1st Cross-country, National Junior Championships
Pan American Junior Championships

2nd Cross-country
3rd Team relay
