= Danny van der Tuuk =

Dutch cyclist

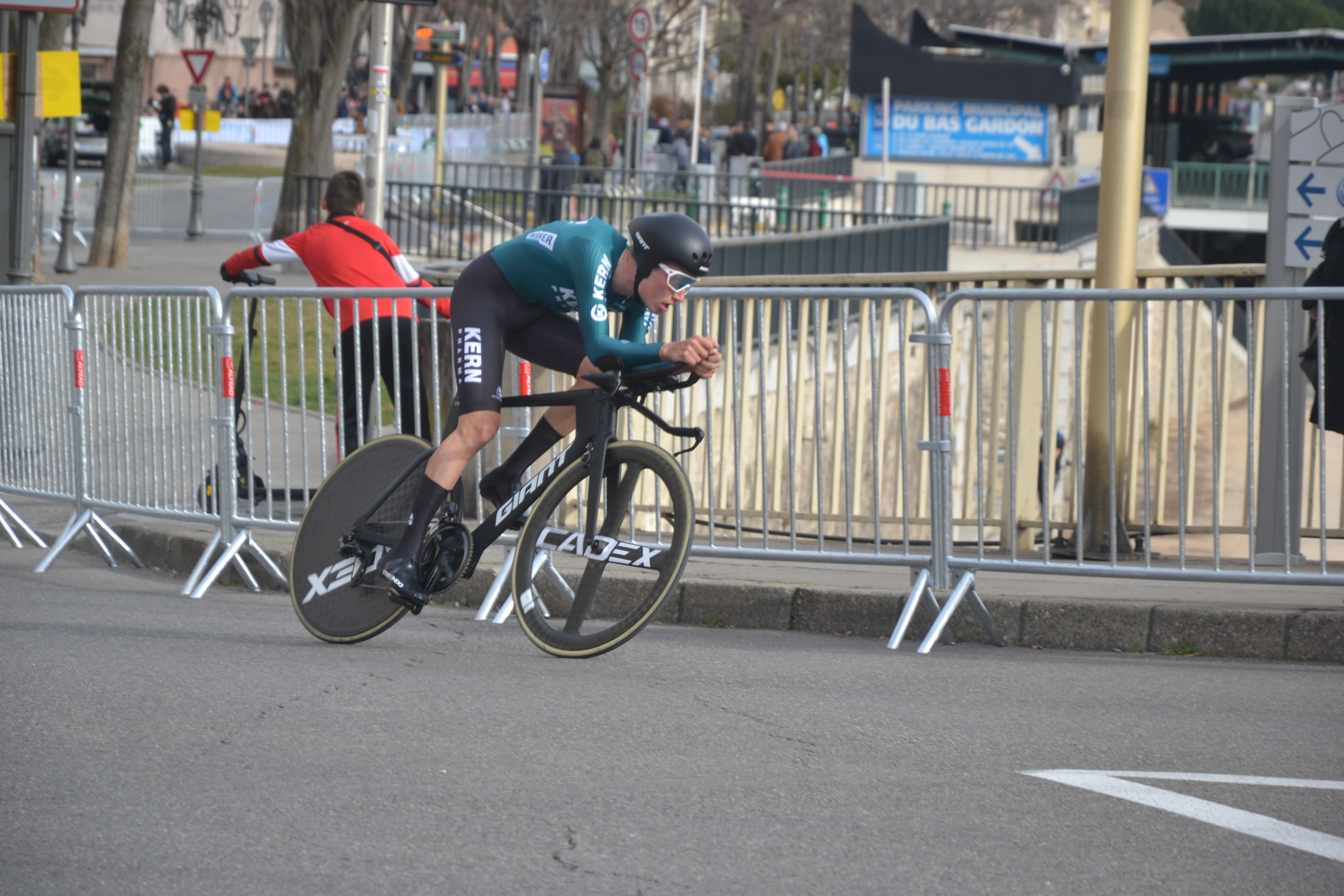
- Van der Tuuk during the 2022 Étoile de Bessèges

Personal information
- Full name: Danny van der Tuuk
- Born: 5 November 1999 (age 26) Assen, Netherlands
- Height: 1.80 m (5 ft 11 in)
- Weight: 60 kg (132 lb)

Cycling career
- Sport: Cycling
- Current team: Euskaltel–Euskadi
- Discipline: Road
- Role: Rider
- Rider type: Climber

Amateur team
- 2015–2017: Forte Young

Professional teams
- 2018–2020: Metec–TKH
- 2021–2024: Equipo Kern Pharma
- 2025–: Euskaltel–Euskadi

Danny van der Tuuk (born 5 November 1999) is a Polish-Dutch professional racing cyclist, who currently rides for UCI ProTeam Euskaltel–Euskadi.

== Personal life ==
He is the older brother of fellow racing cyclist Axel van der Tuuk. His mother Kaśka Rogulska is a former speed skater, who competed for both Poland and the Netherlands. Outside of cycling, van der Tuuk owns a clothing company alongside his brother Axel, known as D&A. He started cycling as a child initially to train for speed-skating but at 14 years old he started to cycle to compete.

In 2024, van der Tuuk obtained Polish citizenship, which he now races under.

== Career ==
=== Amateur (2015 to 2017) ===
Van de Tuuk signed for the Forte Young Junior cycling team in July 2015 for one and half years through to the end of 2016. In March 2017 van der Tuuk won the Trofeo Victor Cabedo after launching an attack in the final kilometres to win by less than a wheel to Enrique Gandía. Van der Tuuk won the opening stage of Ronde des Vallées a junior stage-race held in France. He lost the lead in the second stage time trial where he dropped to fourth overall. The final stage ended with van der Tuuk in fourth place moving him to third overall.

=== Metec–TKH (2018 to 2020) ===
Van de Tuuk started 2018, his first UCI continental season, with Metec–TKH. His goals for the year included; the Olympia's Tour, Ronde van Drenthe and Gouden Pijl. His first race of the season was the Ronde van Drenthe where he was in the break of the day, unfortunately the effort was too much for van der Tuuk who pulled out of the race. During stage 3 of the 2019 Czech Cycling Tour van der Tuuk attacked and was part of the early break. He was caught as the UCI WorldTour teams paced to endure the stage ended in a mass sprint, he finished in 76th last place in the peloton.

=== Equipo Kern Pharma (2021 to present) ===
After 3 years with Metec–TKH van der Tuuk joined Equipo Kern Pharma in 2021 to start his first professional season. 2022 brought van der Tuuk his first Cycling monument participation, Liège–Bastogne–Liège, where he finished over 21 minutes down in 114th position. Van der Tuuk was selected to ride the 2022 Presidential Tour of Turkey. During stage 1 he crashed heavily and was rushed to hospital. The injuries were not serious and he was able to continue the race where he finished 37th overall. With the 2022 Vuelta a España starting in van der Tuuk's home country he was on the shortlist to start. His Equipo Kern Pharma team decided to go with a more Spanish focused team with van der Tuuk missing out. In October 2022 van der Tuuk announced he had extended his contract with kern Pharma to the end of 2024.

== Major results ==
2017
1st Trofeo Victor Cabedo
3rd Overall Ronde des Vallées

1st Stage 1

2024
4th Time trial, National Road Championships
2026
1st Mountains classification, Volta a la Comunitat Valenciana
3rd Classique Djamaa El Kbir
6th Time trial, National Road Championships
