= Bourg-en-Bresse Ain Cyclisme =

French road cycling team

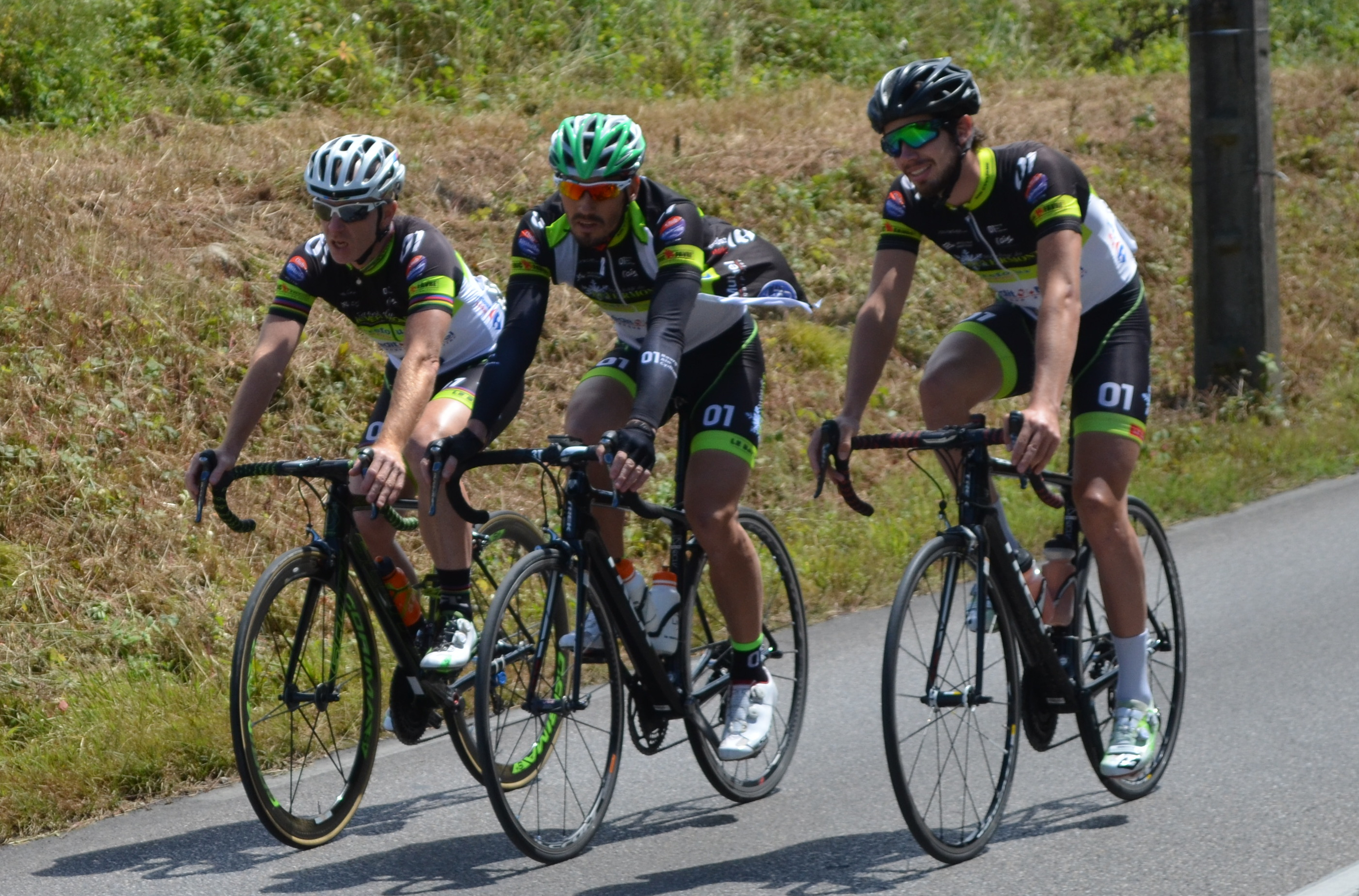
- The team in 2016

Team information
- UCI code: BAC
- Registered: France
- Founded: 2008
- Discipline: Road
- Status: DN1 (–2024); UCI Continental (2025–)
- Bicycles: Focus

Key personnel
- General manager: Thibaut Chanel
- Team managers: Vincent Garin; Christian Milesi

Team name history
- 2008–: Bourg-en-Bresse Ain Cyclisme

Bourg-en-Bresse Ain Cyclisme is a French UCI Continental road cycling team based in Bourg-en-Bresse. Established in 2008, it was a national first-division (DN1) club team until 2025.

== Major wins ==
2023
Overall Tour du Pays de Montbéliard, Sten Van Gucht

Stage 1, Sten Van Gucht

Stage 3 Giro della Valle d'Aosta, Martin Tjøtta
Stage 3 Tour de la Mirabelle, Sten Van Gucht
2025
Stage 1 Ronde de l'Isard, Huw Buck Jones
2026
Portuguese National Under-23 Road Race Championships, Daniel Lima
Stage 3 Ronde de l'Isard, Huw Buck Jones
