= Kuota =

Italian bicycle brand

Coordinates: 45.5981555°N 9.3066041°E

- Type: Private
- Industry: Bicycle industry
- Founded: 2001; 25 years ago, Villasanta
- Headquarters: Canada
- Area served: Worldwide
- Products: Bicycles and related components
- Parent: Kuota International Co. Ltd.
- Website: www.eu.kuota-cycle.com www.shop.kuota-cycle.com

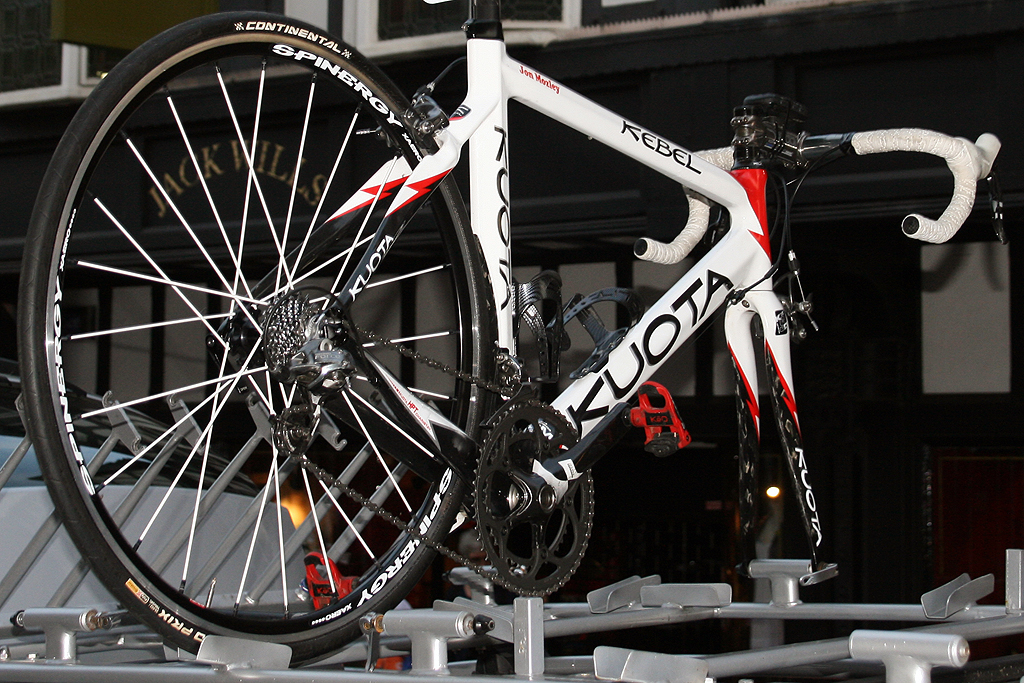
A Kuota Kebel at the Halfords Tour Series 2010 in Chester

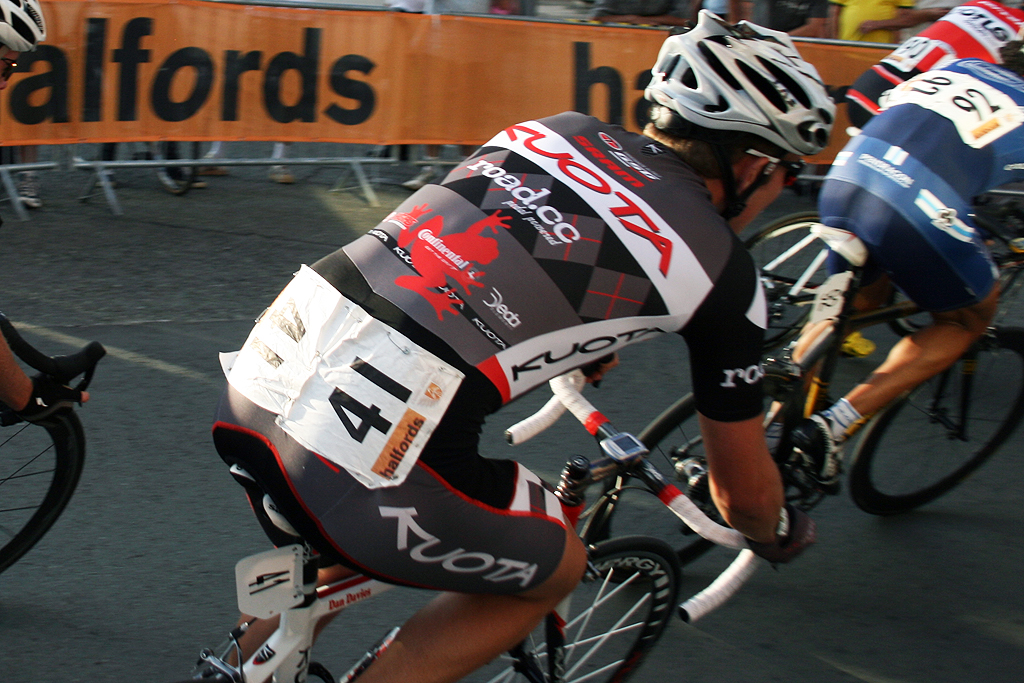
A Kuota-road.cc rider at the Halfords Tour Series 2010 in Chester

Kuota is an Italian bicycle brand, owned by Kuota International Co. Ltd, founded in 2001. Their bicycles are distributed in Europe and the UK, Canada, USA, Japan, Korea, Taiwan, China, Hong Kong, Malaysia, Thailand, Indonesia and Philippines.

== Products ==
From 2026, Kuota's collection has focused on one-piece moulded carbon-fibre frames, manufactured using a continuous moulding process designed to minimise bonded joints within the main frame structure. The range includes road, endurance, gravel, time trial, triathlon and cross-country mountain bike models. The product range includes road, endurance, time trial, triathlon, gravel and mountain bike frames.

The 2026 collection leads with Kuota's one piece moulded K-A1 Aero Bike and one piece moulded Khan Hill Climbing Bike.

In 2003 the Khan model was named “Best Bike of the Year” by the French bicycle magazine Le Cycle.

== Involvement in cycling and triathlon ==
2001 to 2017: Kuota is sponsor of the UCI continental road cycling team Team RothAKROS since the beginning of season 2017. From 2002 to 2017, KUOTA was sponsor or cosponsor of several professional road cycling teams such as Team Uniqa (2007), OUCH–Maxxis (2009), Indeland [2010], Kalev Chocolate-Kuota (2010), Team Dila (200X), Ag2r–La Mondiale (2010–2013), Agritubel (2009) and Androni Giocattoli (2015–2016) as well as several U23 and junior cycling teams. In 2015 Kuota started sponsoring Lensworld.eu–Zannata, a UCI women's road cycling team.

2018 to 2019: For the 2018 and 2019 seasons, Kuota provided bikes for the UCI Pro Continental team Cofidis.

2026: After production was paused in 2020, Kuota returned to racing, sponsoring Team UKYO (2026) riding the Kuota K-A1 Aero Bike and KT8 TT Bikes with many stage wins for the team Riders include: Tommaso Dati, Andrea D'Amato, Nahom Zeray. Kuota also took Gold and Bronze in the European Olympics (2026) with the Italian National Cycling Team.

In triathlon, Kuota has been supporting several international athletes, such as two time Ironman world champion Normann Stadler, Andy Böcherer and Andy Potts. Kuota is currently sponsoring the 2016 Challenge Fuerteventura champion and 2016 4th at Ironman Kona Anja Beranek (since 2015), the two time Italian Olympic triathlete and 2016 Ironman Taiwan champion Daniel Fontana (since 2009) and British Triathlon squad member Tom Bishop (since 2017).

== See also ==
- List of bicycle parts
- List of Italian companies
