= Markel Beloki =

Spanish cyclist (born 2005)

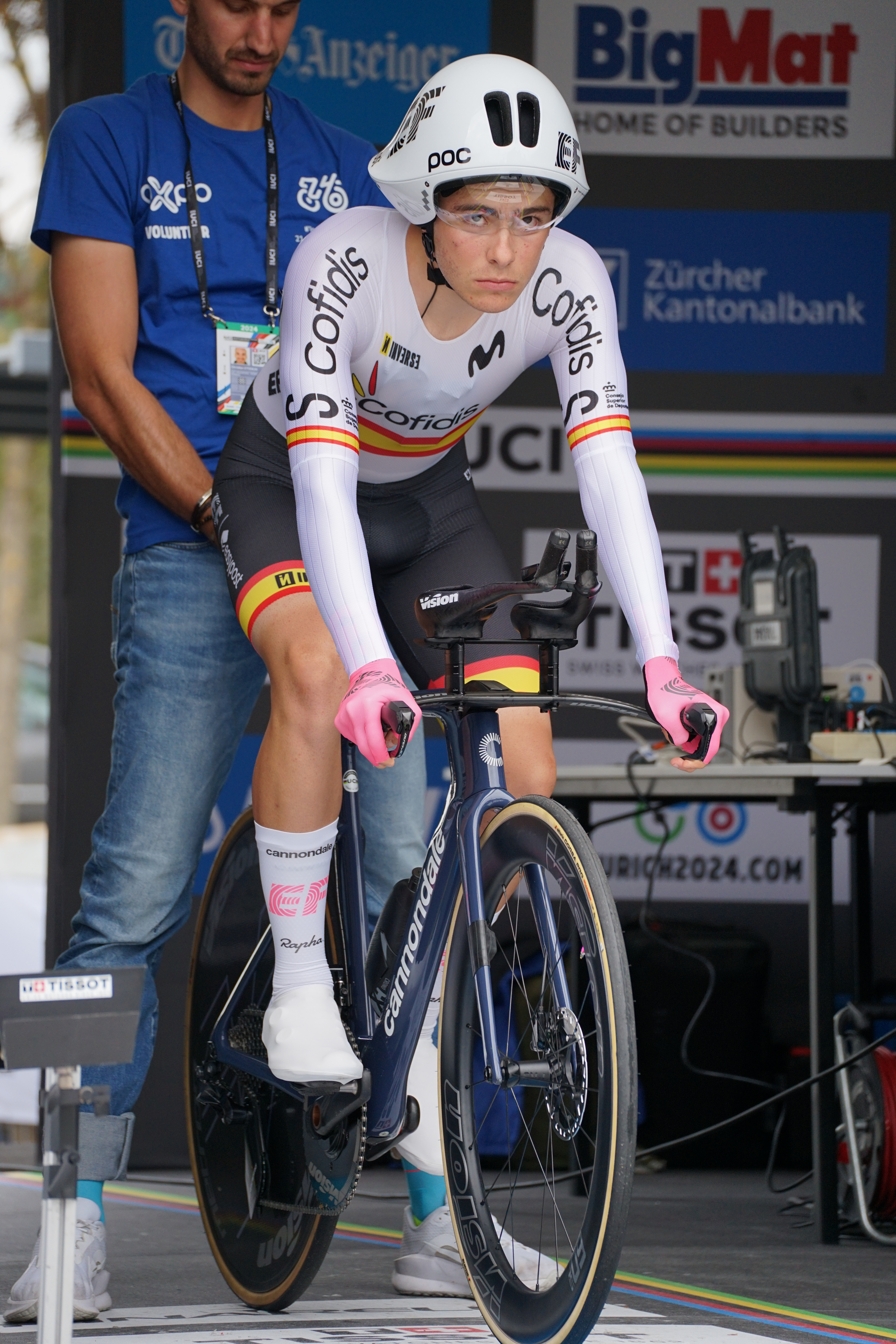
- Beloki at the 2024 World Road Championships

Personal information
- Full name: Markel Beloki Fernández
- Born: 27 July 2005 (age 21) Vitoria-Gasteiz, Spain

Cycling career
- Sport: Cycling
- Current team: EF Education–EasyPost
- Discipline: Road
- Role: Rider

Amateur teams
- 2021: Iridoi Eguzkilore
- 2022–2023: MMR Factory Racing

Professional team
- 2024–: EF Education–EasyPost

Markel Beloki Fernández (born 27 July 2005) is a Spanish professional cyclist who rides for UCI WorldTeam EF Education–EasyPost. In 2023, he became the Spanish junior time trial champion. He is the son of former professional cyclist Joseba Beloki, who finished in the top three at the Tour de France three times.

== Early life and junior career ==
Born in Vitoria-Gasteiz, he discovered cycling with his father as a child and joined a Basque cycling club at the age of 12 years-old.

A member of the MMR Cycling Academy, he rode during the winter of 2022–2023 in a six-day internship with the UCI World Tour team Movistar. In 2023, he won several victories in Spanish junior races, including the Junior National Time Trial title as well as second place in the junior national road race. Selected to represent Spain at the Junior World and Junior European Championships, his finished in seventh place in the European Championship time trial.

== Professional career ==
In late 2023 he signed a two-year contract to ride for UCI WorldTeam EF Education–EasyPost for the 2024 and 2025 seasons. He made his Grand Tour debut at the 2025 Vuelta, where he was the youngest rider in the race. In 2025, he won stage and overall victory at the Tour Alsace in 2025 and the 2026 Tour de l'Ain. Ahead of the 2027 season, he signed for UCI WorldTeam Netcompany–Ineos.

== Personal life ==
He is the son of three-time Tour de France podium finisher Joseba Beloki. However, they have different body types with Markel already taller than his father by the age of 17.

== Major results ==
2022
1st Subida a Opakua
3rd Overall Bizkaiko Itzulia

1st Stage 1

2023
National Junior Road Championships

1st Time trial
2nd Road race

1st Beasaingo Proba
1st Memorial Chely Álvarez
2nd Overall Vuelta Junior a la Ribera del Duero

1st Stage 1

2nd Trofeo Monte Llosorio
3rd Overall Bizkaiko Itzulia

1st Stage 1

4th Overall Vuelta al Besaya
7th Time trial, UEC European Junior Road Championships
2024
2nd Time trial, National Road Championships
2025
1st Overall Tour Alsace

1st Young rider classification
1st Stage 3

2026 (2 pro wins)
1st Overall Tour de l'Ain

1st Points classification
1st Young rider classification
1st Stage 2

8th Overall Vuelta a Burgos
9th GP Miguel Induráin

=== Grand Tour general classification results timeline ===
| Grand Tour | 2025 | 2026 |
|---|---|---|
| Giro d'Italia | — | 35 |
| Tour de France | — | — |
| Vuelta a España | 50 | |
