= Francisco Joel Peñuela =

Venezuelan cyclist

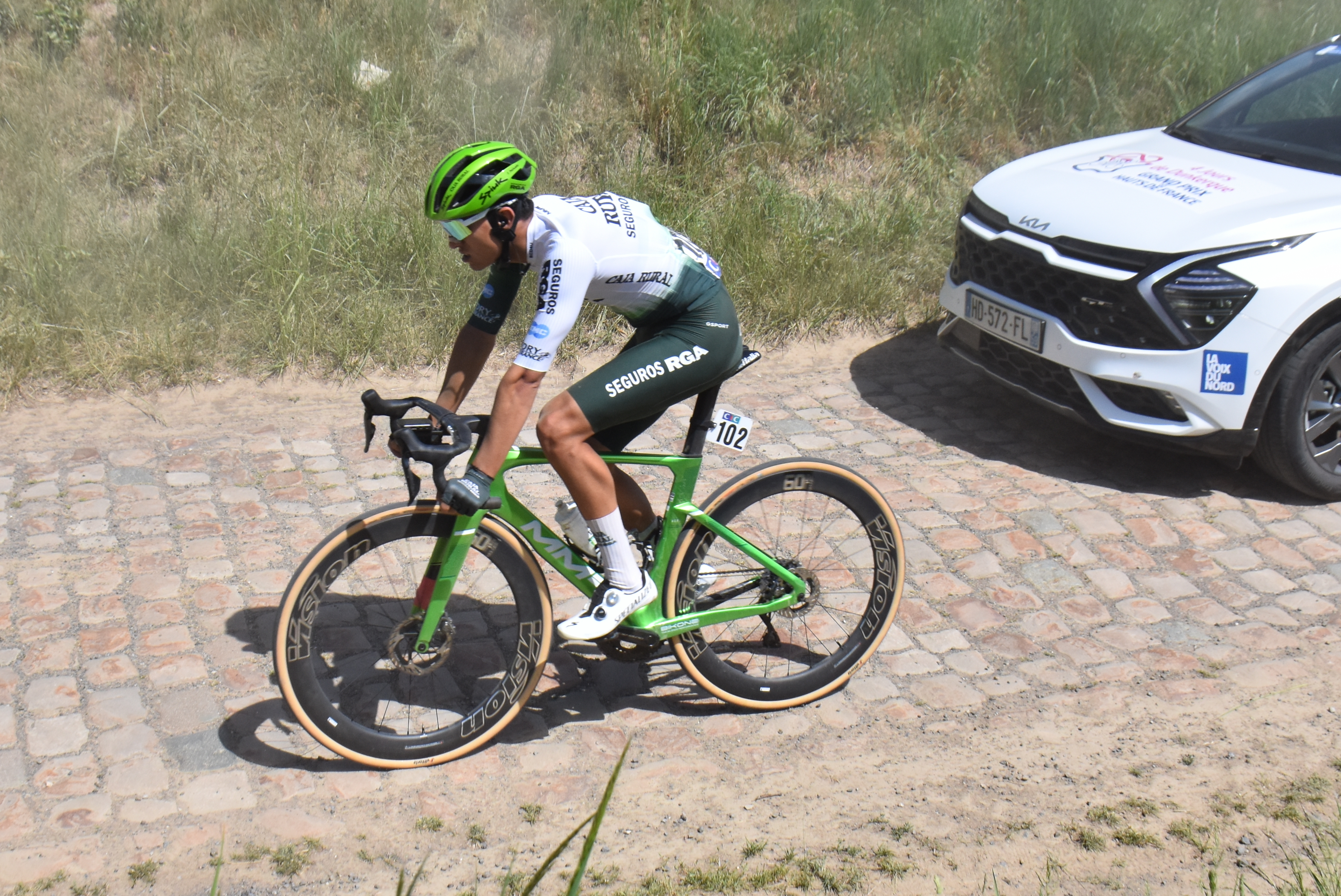
- Peñuela in 2025

Personal information
- Full name: Francisco Joel Peñuela Sandoval
- Born: 1 February 2001 (age 25)
- Height: 1.75 m (5 ft 9 in)
- Weight: 56 kg (123 lb)

Cycling career
- Sport: Cycling
- Current team: Caja Rural–Seguros RGA
- Discipline: Road
- Role: Rider

Amateur teams
- 2019–2020: Venezuela País de Futuro–Fina Arroz
- 2020: Tenerife–Bike Point–Pizzería Española
- 2021: Escribano Sport Team
- 2022: Drone Hopper–Gsport–Grupo Innova Tormo

Professional teams
- 2020: Gios–Kiwi Atlántico (stagiaire)
- 2023: Israel Premier Tech Academy
- 2024: Rádio Popular–Paredes–Boavista
- 2025–: Caja Rural–Seguros RGA

Francisco Joel Peñuela Sandoval (born 1 February 2001) is a Venezuelan cyclist, who currently rides for UCI ProTeam Caja Rural–Seguros RGA.

== Major results ==
2018
3rd Road race, National Junior Road Championships
2019
10th Road race, Pan American Junior Road Championships
2023
2nd Ruota d'Oro
9th Gran Premio Sportivi di Poggiana
10th GP Capodarco
10th Grand Prix de Plouay
2024 (1 pro win)
1st Stage 7 Volta a Portugal
1st Stage 1 Grande Prémio Douro Internacional
2nd Overall Volta ao Alentejo
2025
2nd Time trial, National Road Championships
3rd Overall Vuelta del Uruguay
7th Grand Prix du Morbihan
8th Boucles de l'Aulne
2026
6th Circuit Franco-Belge
