= West Bohemia Tour =

Czech multi-day road cycling race

Race details
- Date: August
- Region: Czech Republic
- Discipline: Road race
- Competition: UCI Europe Tour
- Type: Stage race
- Organiser: Roman Kreuziger Racing Academy

History
- First edition: 2024
- Editions: 3 (as of 2026)
- First winner: Victor Vaneeckhoutte (BEL)
- Most wins: No repeat winners
- Most recent: Václav Ježek (CZE)

The West Bohemia Tour is a multi-day road cycling race that has been held annually in the Czech Republic since 2024. It is part of the UCI Europe Tour in category 2.2U.

== Winners ==
Year	Country	Rider	Team
2024	Belgium	Victor Vaneeckhoutte	Lotto–Dstny Development Team
2025	Italy	Federico Savino	Soudal–Quick-Step Devo Team
2026	Czech Republic	Václav Ježek	Kasper Crypto4me
