= Soudal–Quick-Step Devo Team =

Belgian cycling team

Team information
- UCI code: SQD
- Registered: Belgium
- Founded: 2015
- Discipline: Road
- Status: UCI Continental

Key personnel
- General manager: Bart Roosens
- Team manager: Kevin Hulsmans

Team name history
- 2015 2016–2019 2020–2021 2022 2023–: Home Solution–Anmapa; Home Solution–Anmapa–Soenens; Home Solution–Soenens; Elevate p/b Home Solution–Soenens; Soudal–Quick-Step Devo Team
Soudal–Quick-Step Devo Team jersey
Jersey

Soudal–Quick-Step Devo Team is a Belgian UCI Continental team founded in 2015. The team gained UCI Continental status in 2022. Since 2023, the team has acted as the development team for UCI WorldTeam Soudal–Quick-Step.

== Team roster ==
As of 2 July 2025.

Rider	Date of birth
Henrique Bravo (BRA)	20 April 2006 (age 20)
Mathijs De Clercq (BEL)	23 February 2006 (age 20)
Renato Favero (ITA)	27 February 2005 (age 21)
Jelle Harteel (BEL)	8 August 2003 (age 23)
Senne Hulsmans (BEL)	22 October 2003 (age 22)
Hodei Muñoz (ESP)	1 August 2006 (age 20)
Thomas Pesenti (ITA)	16 October 1999 (age 26)
Federico Savino (ITA)	10 July 2004 (age 22)
Joeri Schaper (NED)	29 January 2006 (age 20)

Rider	Date of birth
Jasper Schoofs (BEL)	30 March 2006 (age 20)
Gauthier Servranckx (BEL)	7 July 2005 (age 21)
Viktor Soenens (BEL)	5 October 2005 (age 20)
Erazem Valjavec (SLO)	18 August 2006 (age 20)
Matijs Van Strijthem (BEL)	14 March 2006 (age 20)
Lars Vanden Heede (BEL)	18 March 2005 (age 21)
Jonathan Vervenne (BEL)	27 May 2003 (age 23)
Marc Zafra (ESP)	22 September 2006 (age 19)

== Major wins ==
2020
Paris–Tours Espoirs, Rune Herregodts
2023
Stages 1 & 2 Tour du Rwanda, Ethan Vernon
Le Tour des 100 Communes, Jonathan Vervenne
Youngster Coast Challenge, Warre Vangheluwe
Gent–Wevelgem U23, Gil Gelders
Stage 2 Giro Next Gen, Gil Gelders
Ruota d'Oro, Gil Gelders
Il Piccolo Lombardia, Junior Lecerf
2024
Stage 1 Tour du Rwanda (TTT) (Note: The riders in the squad were Junior Lecerf, Jelle Harteel, Pepijn Reinderink, Jonathan Vervenne and Jan Kino.)
Stage 4 Tour du Rwanda, Junior Lecerf
Stage 3 Circuit des Ardennes, Federico Savino
Stages 2 & 4 Giro Next Gen, Paul Magnier
Stage 2 West Bohemia Tour, Lars Vanden Heede
Stage 3 West Bohemia Tour, Senne Hulsmans
Grote Prijs Stad Halle, Federico Savino
2025
Stage 2 Giro Next Gen, Jonathan Vervenne
2026
Ist overall Tour of Antalya, Henrique Bravo
1st Boucle de l'Artois, Cériel Desal

== National champions ==
2023
Belgian Under-23 Time Trial, Jonathan Vervenne
Netherlands National Under-23 Road Race, Pepijn Reinderink
2024
Italian Under-23 Time Trial, Andrea Raccagni
Cypriot Under-23 Road Race, Bogdan Zabelinskiy
2025
Belgian Under-23 Time Trial, Jonathan Vervenne
