= CIC U Nantes Atlantique =

French road cycling team

Team UC Nantes Atlantique
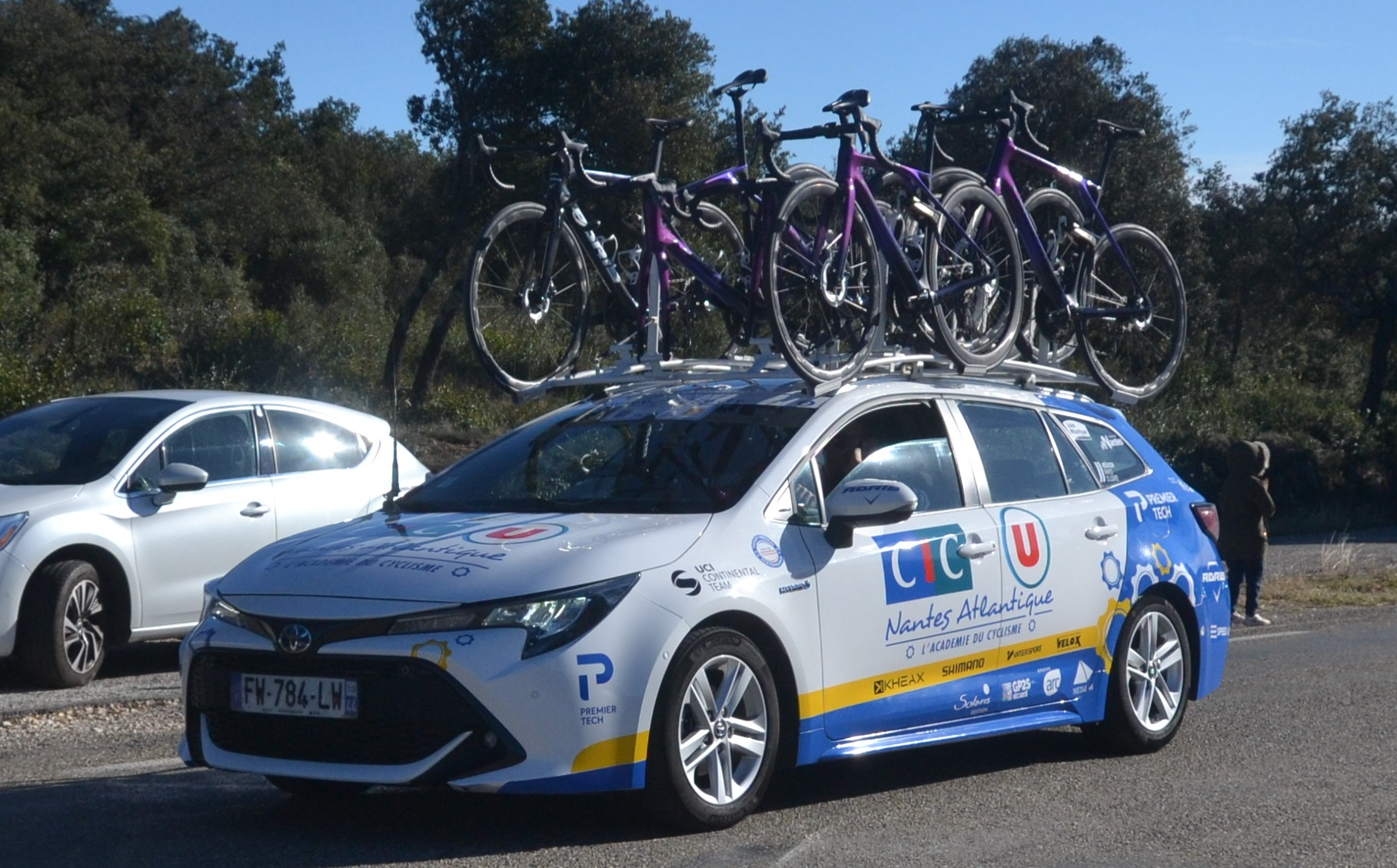
- Team car

Team information
- UCI code: 194 (–2022); UNA (2022); UCN (2023–)
- Registered: France
- Founded: 1909
- Discipline: Road
- Status: DN1 (–2021); UCI Continental (2022–)
- Bicycles: Wilier Triestina

Key personnel
- Team managers: Axel Clot-Courant; Stéphane André

Team name history
- 1909–2021 2022 2023–: UC Nantes Atlantique; Team U Nantes Atlantique; CIC U Nantes Atlantique

CIC U Nantes Atlantique is a French UCI Continental road cycling team established in 1909. Until 2022, it was a national first-division (DN1) club team, but upgraded to UCI Continental status for the 2022 season.

== Team roster ==
As of 2 February 2024.

Rider	Date of birth
Pierre Henry Basset (FRA)	29 March 2004 (age 22)
Enzo Boulet (FRA)	26 February 2003 (age 23)
Clément Braz Afonso (FRA)	8 November 1999 (age 26)
Enzo Briand (FRA)	8 May 2004 (age 22)
Léo Danès (FRA)	9 December 1996 (age 29)
Maël Guégan (FRA)	19 January 1998 (age 28)

Rider	Date of birth
Antoine Hue (FRA)	17 December 2004 (age 21)
Artus Jaladeau (FRA)	8 February 2000 (age 26)
Yaël Joalland (FRA)	20 September 2000 (age 25)
Matisse Julien (CAN)	21 January 2003 (age 23)
Robin Plamondon (CAN)	7 January 2000 (age 26)
Jon Rye-Johnsen (NOR)	8 February 2003 (age 23)
