= Tour of Valle d'Aosta - Mont-Blanc =

Bike race in Italy

Tour of Valle d'Aosta / Mont-Blanc
Race details
- Date: July
- Region: Aosta Valley, Italy
- Local name(s): Giro della Valle d'Aosta / Mont-Blanc (Italian); Tour de la Vallée d'Aoste / Mont-Blanc (French)
- Discipline: Road race
- Competition: UCI Europe Tour
- Type: Stage race
- Organiser: Società Ciclistica Valdostana
- Race director: François Domaine
- Web site: www.girovalledaosta.it

History
- First edition: 1962
- Editions: 62 (as of 2026)
- First winner: Gilberto Vendemmiati (ITA)
- Most wins: Ivan Gotti (ITA); Yaroslav Popovych (UKR); Marco Marzano (ITA); Fabio Aru (ITA); Jarno Widar (BEL) (2 wins)
- Most recent: Henrique Bravo (BRA)

Tour of Valle d'Aosta / Mont-Blanc (Italian: Giro della Valle d'Aosta / Mont-Blanc; French: Tour de la Vallée d'Aoste / Mont-Blanc) is a stage race road bicycle race held annually in August in Aosta Valley, Italy. Since 2005, the race is organized as a 2.2 event on the UCI Europe Tour. Since 2012, the race takes place in July.

The concerned municipalities are: Arvier, Courmayeur, Saint-Vincent Bionaz, Verrayes, Fénis and Valtournenche.

== Winners ==
Year	Country	Rider	Team
1962	Italy	Gilberto Vendemmiati	
1963	Italy	Gianni Motta	
1964	Italy	Adriano Passuello	
1965–1966	No race		
1967	Italy	Arturo Pecchielan	
1968	Italy	Pierfranco Vianelli	
1969	Italy	Vittorio Urbani	
1970	Italy	Franco Baroni	
1971	Italy	Mario Corti	
1972	Italy	Efrem Dall'Anese	
1973	Italy	Gabriele Mirri	
1974	Italy	Giuseppe Rodella	
1975	Italy	Leone Pizzini	
1976	Italy	Francesco Masi	
1977	Italy	Ennio Vanotti	
1978	Italy	Claudio Gosetto	
1979	Italy	Alessandro Paganessi	
1980	Italy	Fabrizio Verza	
1981	Italy	Maurizio Viotto	
1982	Italy	Stefano Tomasini	
1983	Belgium	Luc Wallays	
1984	Italy	Flavio Giupponi	
1985	Sweden	Stefan Brykt	
1986	Italy	Marco Lanteri	
1987	France	Fabrice Philipot	
1988	Italy	Enrico Zaina	
1989	Italy	Ivan Gotti	
1990	Italy	Ivan Gotti	
1991	Italy	Wladimir Belli	
1992	Italy	Gilberto Simoni	
1993	Italy	Roberto Menegotto	
1994	Italy	Roberto Pistore	
1995	Italy	Valentino Fois	
1996	Italy	Claudio Vandelli	
1997	Italy	Devis Miorin	
1998	Moldova	Igor Pugaci	
1999	Czech Republic	Milan Kadlec	
2000	Ukraine	Yaroslav Popovych	Vellutex Zoccorinese
2001	Ukraine	Yaroslav Popovych	Vellutex Zoccorinese
2002	Italy	Marco Marzano	Sintofarm Feralpi
2003	Italy	Marco Marzano	Ceramiche Pagnoncelli
2004	Slovenia	Tomasz Nose	Slovenia (national team)
2005	Italy	Morris Possoni	Unidelta Egidio Colibrì Garda
2006	Italy	Alessandro Bisolti	U.C. Palazzago
2007	Colombia	Alex Cano	Unidelta Bottoli Arvedi Garda
2008	Italy	Michele Gaia	Bergamasca 1902
2009	France	Thibaut Pinot	France (national team)
2010	Russia	Petr Ignatenko	Itera–Katusha
2011	Italy	Fabio Aru	U.C. Palazzago
2012	Italy	Fabio Aru	U.C. Palazzago
2013	Italy	Davide Villella	Team Colpack
2014	Colombia	Bernardo Suaza	4-72 Colombia
2015	Australia	Robert Power	Australia (national team)
2016	Switzerland	Kilian Frankiny	BMC Development Team
2017	Russia	Pavel Sivakov	BMC Development Team
2018	Kazakhstan	Vadim Pronskiy	Astana City
2019	Belgium	Mauri Vansevenant	EFC–L&R–Vulsteke
2020	No race due to COVID-19 pandemic		
2021	New Zealand	Reuben Thompson	Équipe Continentale Groupama–FDJ
2022	France	Lenny Martinez	Équipe Continentale Groupama–FDJ
2023	Ireland	Darren Rafferty	Hagens Berman Axeon
2024	Belgium	Jarno Widar	Lotto–Dstny Development Team
2025	Belgium	Jarno Widar	Lotto Development Team
2026	Brazil	Henrique Bravo	Soudal–Quick-Step Devo Team
