= Cofidis (cycling team) =

French cycling team

Team information
- UCI code: COF
- Registered: France
- Founded: 1997
- Discipline: Road
- Status: UCI Professional Continental (2010–2019); UCI WorldTeam (2005–2009, 2020–2025); UCI ProTeam (2026–)
- Bicycles: Look (2009–2014, 2023–); Orbea (2015–2017); Kuota (2018–2019); De Rosa (2020–2022)
- Website: Team home page

Key personnel
- General manager: Cédric Vasseur

Cofidis (UCI team code: COF) is a French professional road bicycle racing team sponsored by a money-lending company, Cofidis. It was started in 1996 by Cyrille Guimard, the former manager of Bernard Hinault, Greg LeMond and Laurent Fignon of the Renault–Elf–Gitane team of the 1980s. The team's sponsor has supported the team despite repeated problems such as doping scandals. After it was part of the UCI ProTour for the ProTour's first five seasons, from 2010 the team competed as a UCI Professional Continental team. The team joined the UCI World Tour for the 2020 season, but was relegated to the UCI ProSeries in 2026.

== History ==
Cyrille Guimard started the team in 1996 with backing from François Migraine, the chief executive of Cofidis. An early acquisition was Lance Armstrong, formerly of Motorola Cycling Team. Armstrong was dropped because of his cancer and another American, Bobby Julich, became leader for stage races. Julich's place in the top three of the 1998 Tour de France brought the team to the spotlight, and Frank Vandenbroucke brought further results in classics. That year, Cofidis won the team classification in the Tour.

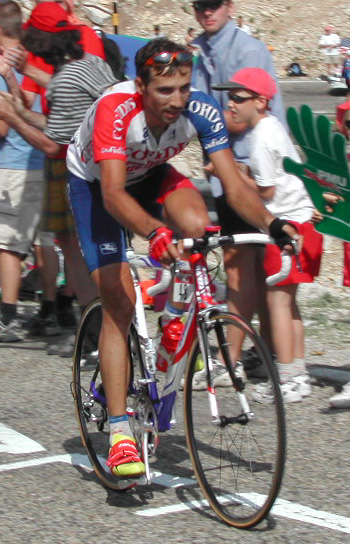
David Moncoutie riding for Cofidis at the 2002 Tour de France.

Years of drought followed as Julich and Vandenbroucke left the team. Vandenbroucke's Belgian compatriots, Nico Mattan, Chris Peers, Peter Farazijn, and Jo Planckaert, stayed on but were criticised for inconsistent performances. Cofidis, on the demand of Migraine, began paying riders by results, judged by the points they won in a season-long competition run by the Union Cycliste Internationale. Belgian riders criticised the policy, saying it would lead riders to ride conservatively to be sure of good placings at the finish. They debated the issue publicly with the manager, Alain Bondue, and left.

David Millar raised the team's profile by winning the prologue of the 2000 Tour de France, taking leadership of the team. Millar criticized the points system and the team relented.

In 2004 Cofidis had three world champions – Igor Astarloa on the road, David Millar in the individual time trial and Laurent Gané on the track. However, a doping scandal involving Millar and other riders led them to stop racing until it was resolved. Astarloa left the team. The investigation decided that doping was by individual riders and that the team was not involved. David Millar has since suggested otherwise, in a strongly worded interview with the BBC. In May 2004 the team announced that Bondue and team doctor Jean-Jacques Menuet had both resigned. The team then returned to competition for the 2004 Tour de France, in which Stuart O'Grady and David Moncoutié won stages, Moncoutié's on Bastille Day.

Following the doping scandals, the team appointed Éric Boyer as team manager in 2005. Moncoutié won on Bastille day again in the 2005 Tour de France – the only French stage win – with O'Grady's help. A new signing, Sylvain Chavanel failed to win a stage or to make a strong impression.

O'Grady and Matthew White left in 2006. Cédric Vasseur – often the road captain – also left. An early victory in Classic Haribo by Arnaud Coyot showed the team still had firepower. Cofidis won the first stage of the 2006 Tour de France with Jimmy Casper, in a chaotic sprint.

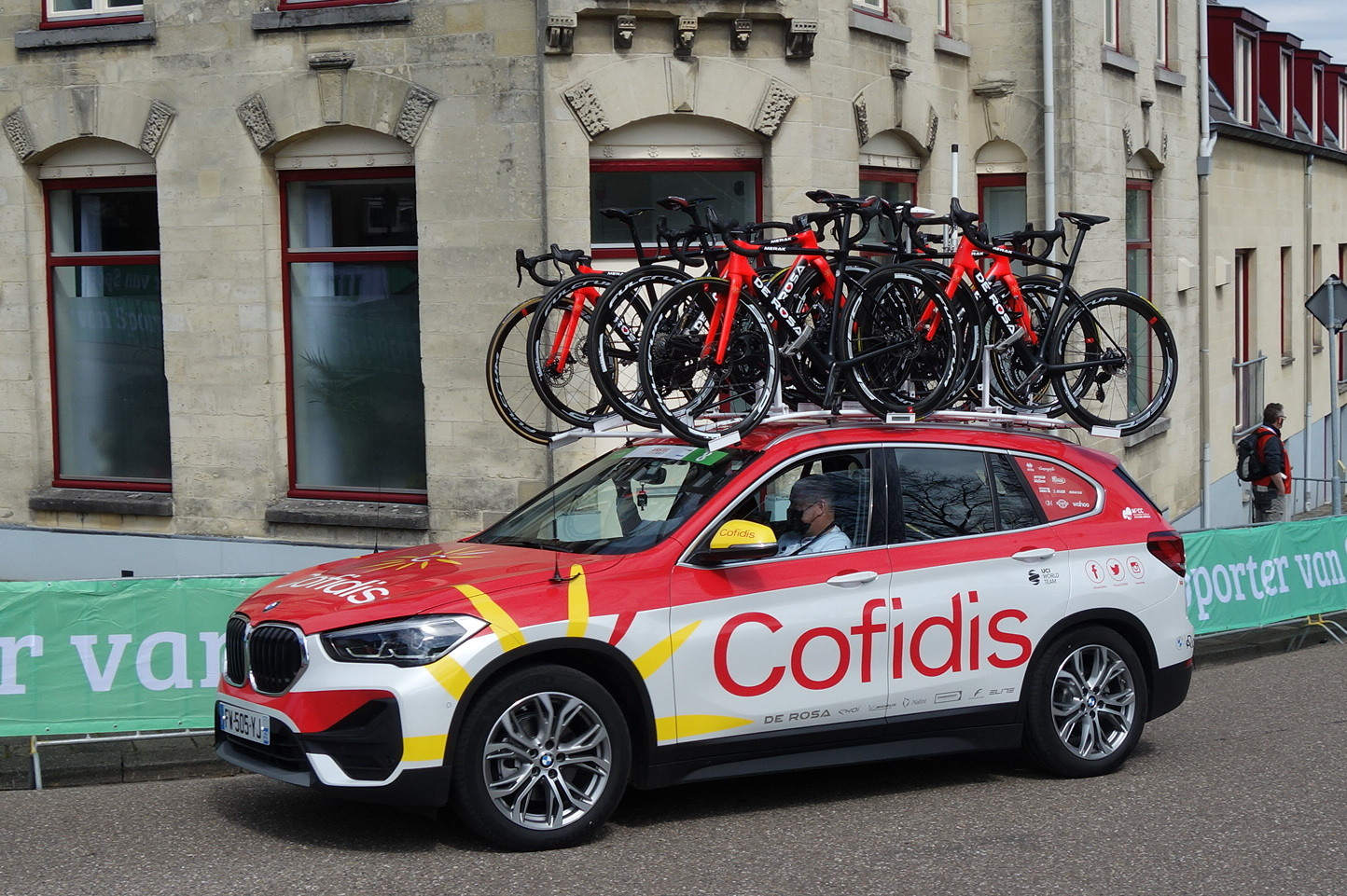
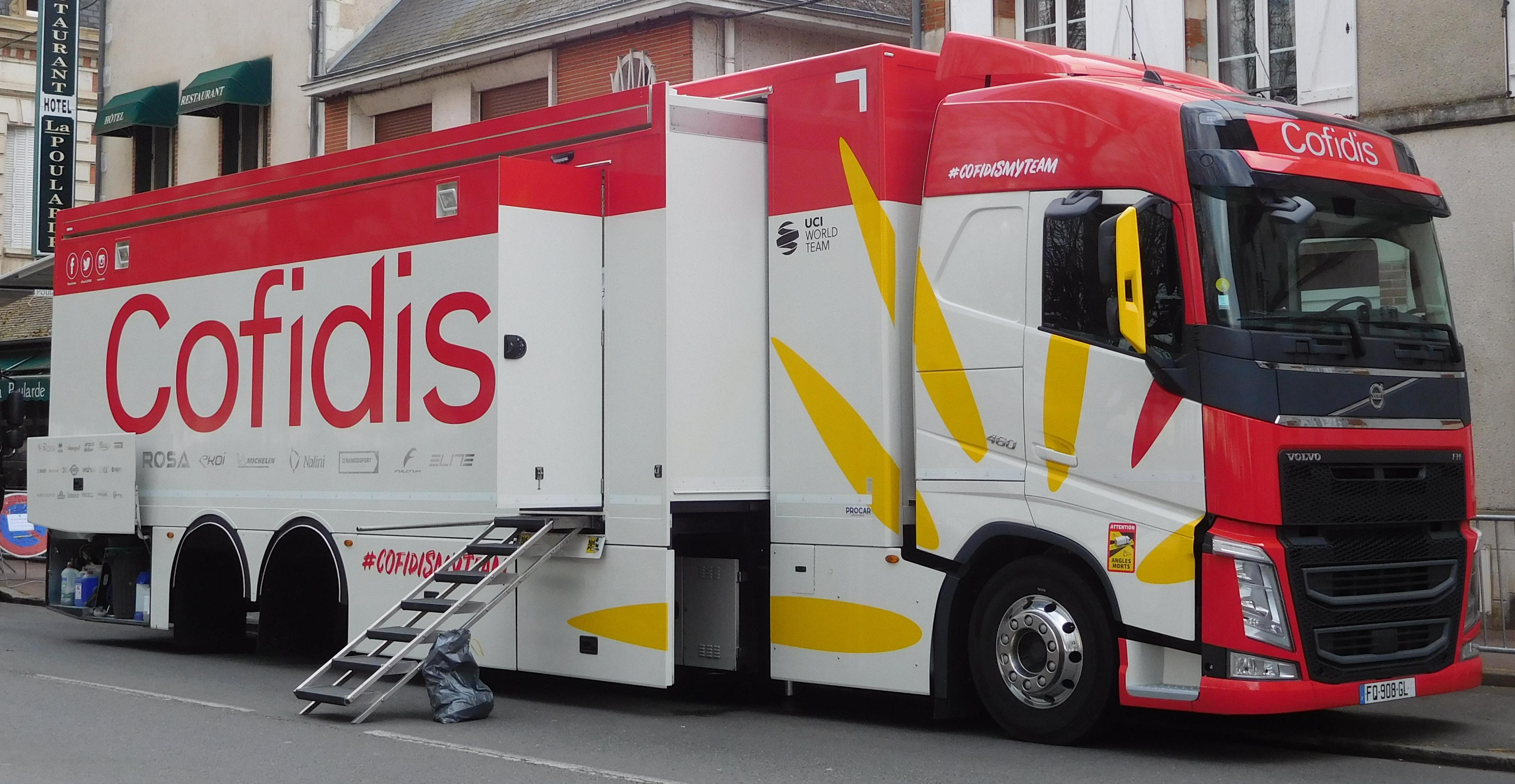
Team Cofidis team vehicles in 2021

For 2007 the team signed Belgians Nick Nuyens and Kevin De Weert from Quick-Step–Innergetic.

On 25 July 2007 Cofidis rider Cristian Moreni failed his doping test after the 11th stage of the Tour de France. His blood contained traces of testosterone. Moreni acknowledged doping. The team withdrew from the Tour.

In 2008 the team enjoyed the most successful season of Boyer's time as manager, with Chavanel winning Dwars door Vlaanderen and Brabantse Pijl and Chavanel and Samuel Dumoulin both taking stage wins in that year's Tour de France.

On 29 September 2009, the UCI ProTour decided not to renew the ProTour licenses of Cofidis and Bbox Bouygues Telecom, due to poor results.

In 2012, the team received a wildcard invitation to the Tour de France, along with three other French-registered teams. A few days before the start of the race, Boyer was sacked as manager of the team, with Migraine blaming him for poor results: he was replaced by former Festina, Astana and FDJ–BigMat directeur sportif Yvon Sanquer.

On 10 July 2012, the first rest day in the 2012 Tour de France, French police raided the Cofidis team hotel, arresting French rider Rémy Di Gregorio on suspicion of doping.

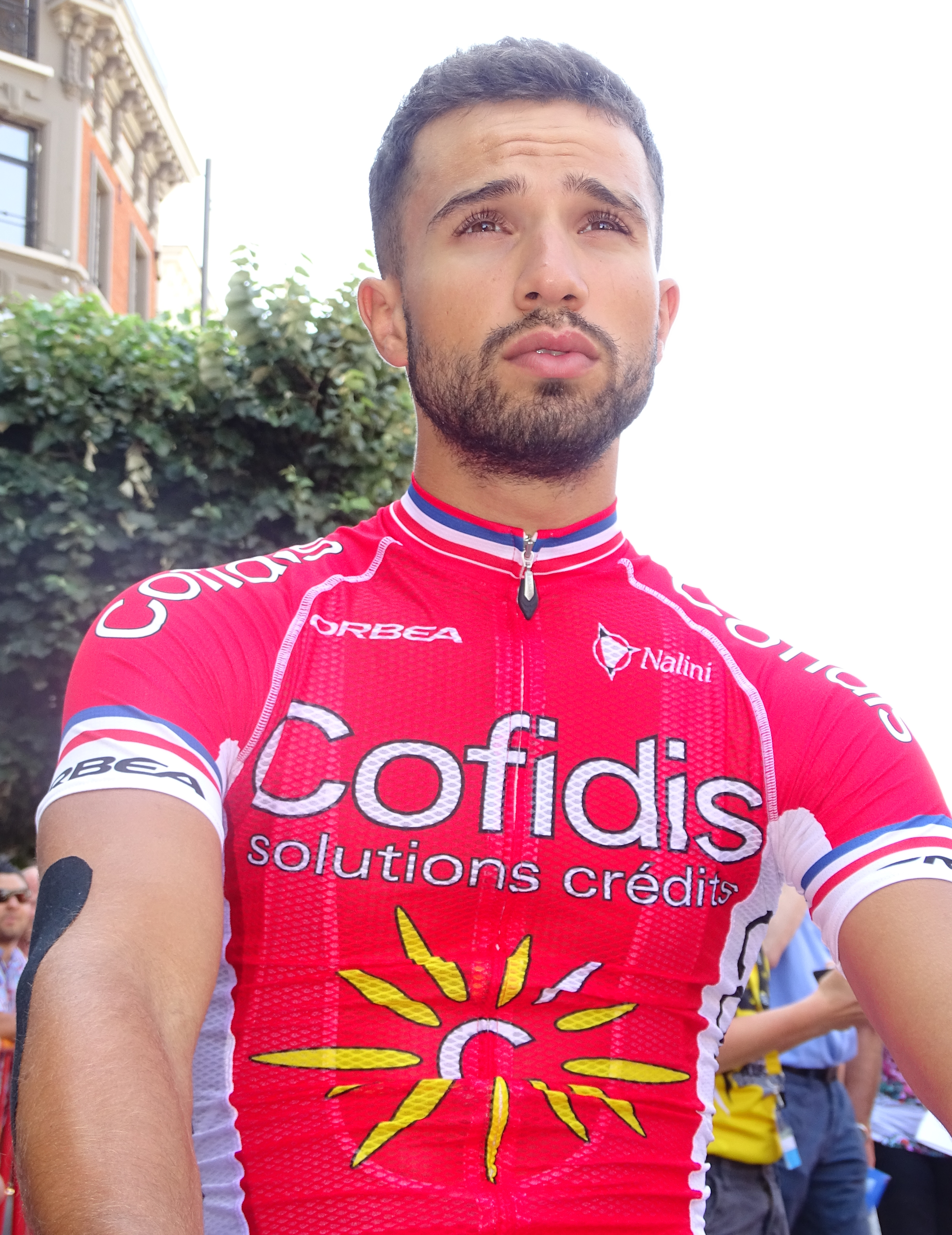
Nacer Bouhanni in his Cofidis jersey at the 2015 Tour de France

For the 2015 season the team announced it had signed 2014 Giro d'Italia points classification winner, Nacer Bouhanni, along with Dominique Rollin, Geoffrey Soupe and Steve Chainel.

After a 2017 season during which the team only took 13 wins, in October of that year the team announced that Sanquer had been sacked, and that he would be replaced as manager by former Cofidis rider Vasseur.

The team returned to UCI WorldTour status in the 2020 season, and the team will using De Rosa bikes beginning from the 2020 season, ending their contract with Kuota.

Starting with the 2023 season the team rode Look bicycles.

Following the 2025 season, the team were set to be relegated from the UCI WorldTour after finishing twentieth in the UCI teams ranking.

== Team roster ==
As of 14 September 2026.

Rider	Date of birth
Piet Allegaert (BEL)	20 January 1995 (age 31)
Stanisław Aniołkowski (POL)	20 January 1997 (age 29)
Alex Aranburu (ESP)	19 September 1995 (age 30)
Jenthe Biermans (BEL)	30 October 1995 (age 30)
Emanuel Buchmann (GER)	18 November 1992 (age 33)
Simon Carr (GBR)	29 August 1998 (age 28)
Camille Charret (FRA)	3 July 2006 (age 20)
Bryan Coquard (FRA)	25 April 1992 (age 34)
Nicolas Debeaumarché (FRA)	24 February 1998 (age 28)
Valentin Ferron (FRA)	8 February 1998 (age 28)
Milan Fretin (BEL)	19 March 2001 (age 25)
Ion Izagirre (ESP)	4 February 1989 (age 37)
Clément Izquierdo (FRA)	16 February 2002 (age 24)
Yaël Joalland (FRA)	20 September 2000 (age 25)
Alex Kirsch (LUX)	12 June 1992 (age 34)

Rider	Date of birth
Oliver Knight (GBR)	25 January 2001 (age 25)
Jan Maas (NED)	19 February 1996 (age 30)
Sam Maisonobe (FRA)	8 September 2003 (age 23)
Jamie Meehan (IRL)	6 September 2003 (age 23)
Sylvain Moniquet (BEL)	14 January 1998 (age 28)
Paul Ourselin (FRA)	13 April 1994 (age 32)
Hugo Page (FRA)	24 July 2001 (age 25)
Alexis Renard (FRA)	1 June 1999 (age 27)
Ludovic Robeet (BEL)	22 May 1994 (age 32)
Louis Rouland (FRA)	21 October 2002 (age 23)
Sergio Samitier (ESP)	31 August 1995 (age 31)
Dylan Teuns (BEL)	1 March 1992 (age 34)
Benjamin Thomas (FRA)	12 September 1995 (age 31)
Damien Touzé (FRA)	7 July 1996 (age 30)
Edoardo Zamperini (ITA)	19 March 2003 (age 23)

== National champions ==
2000
Luxembourgish Time Trial, Steve Fogen
2001
Estonian Road Race, Janek Tombak
2003
Australian Road Race, Stuart O'Grady
Estonian Road Race, Janek Tombak
2005
French Time Trial, Sylvain Chavanel
2006
French Time Trial, Sylvain Chavanel
2008
French Time Trial, Sylvain Chavanel
2009
Estonian Road Race, Rein Taaramäe
Estonian Time Trial, Rein Taaramäe
2010
Estonian Road Race, Kalle Kriit
2011
Estonian Time Trial, Rein Taaramäe
2012
Latvian Road Race, Aleksejs Saramotins
Estonian Time Trial, Rein Taaramäe
2013
Estonian Road Race, Rein Taaramäe
2014
French U23 Cyclo-cross, Clément Venturini
Estonian Time Trial, Gert Jõeäär
2015
Estonian Time Trial, Gert Jõeäär
Estonian Road Race, Gert Jõeäär
2016
Estonian Time Trial, Gert Jõeäär
2017
French Cyclo-cross, Clément Venturini
2018
Eritrean Time Trial, Daniel Teklehaimanot
2019
Eritrean Road Race, Natnael Berhane
2026
Luxembourgish Time Trial, Alex Kirsch

== See also ==
- List of teams and cyclists in the 2008 Tour de France
- 2008 Tour de France
- Tour de France
