= 2026 Volta a Catalunya =

Spanish cycling race

2026 UCI World Tour, race 9 of 36

Race details
- Dates: 23–29 March 2026
- Stages: 7
- Distance: 1,059.1 km (658.1 mi)
- Winning time: 25h 56' 36"

Results
Jersey awarded to the overall winner	Winner	Jonas Vingegaard (DEN)	(Visma–Lease a Bike)
	Second	Lenny Martinez (FRA)	(Team Bahrain Victorious)
	Third	Florian Lipowitz (GER)	(Red Bull–Bora–Hansgrohe)
Jersey awarded to the points classification winner	Points	Dorian Godon (FRA)	(INEOS Grenadiers)
Jersey awarded to the mountains classification winner	Mountains	Giulio Ciccone (ITA)	(Lidl–Trek)
Jersey awarded to the young rider classification winner	Young rider	Lenny Martinez (FRA)	(Team Bahrain Victorious)
Jersey awarded to the team classification winner	Team	(Germany) Red Bull–Bora–Hansgrohe	

The 2026 Volta a Catalunya was a road cycling stage race that took place between 23 and 29 March. It was the 105th edition of the Volta a Catalunya and the ninth race of the 2026 UCI World Tour.

== Teams ==
Seventeen UCI WorldTeams and six UCI ProTeams participated in the race.

UCI WorldTeams

- Alpecin–Premier Tech
- Decathlon CMA CGM
- EF Education–EasyPost
- Groupama–FDJ United
- INEOS Grenadiers
- Lidl–Trek
- Lotto–Intermarché
- Movistar Team
- NSN Cycling Team
- Red Bull–Bora–Hansgrohe
- Soudal–Quick-Step
- Team Bahrain Victorious
- Team Jayco–AlUla
- UAE Team Emirates XRG
- Uno-X Mobility
- Visma–Lease a Bike
- XDS Astana Team

UCI ProTeams

- Burgos Burpellet BH
- Caja Rural–Seguros RGA
- Equipo Kern Pharma
- Euskaltel–Euskadi
- Modern Adventure Pro Cycling
- Pinarello–Q36.5 Pro Cycling Team

== Route ==
Stage characteristics and winners
Stage	Date	Course	Distance	Type	Winner
1	23 March	Sant Feliu de Guíxols to Sant Feliu de Guíxols	172.6 km (107.2 mi)	Flat stage	Dorian Godon (FRA)
2	24 March	Figueres to Banyoles	167.4 km (104.0 mi)	Flat stage	Magnus Cort (DEN)
3	25 March	Costa Daurada (Mont-roig del Camp) to Costa Daurada (Vila-seca)	159.5 km (99.1 mi)	Flat stage	Dorian Godon (FRA)
4	26 March	Mataró to ~~Vallter~~ Camprodon	~~173 km (107 mi)~~ 151 km (94 mi)	Mountain stage	Ethan Vernon (GBR)
5	27 March	La Seu d'Urgell to La Molina (Coll de Pal)	~~155.3 km (96.5 mi)~~ 153.1 km (95.1 mi)	Mountain stage	Jonas Vingegaard (DEN)
6	28 March	Berga to Queralt	158.2 km (98.3 mi)	Mountain stage	Jonas Vingegaard (DEN)
7	29 March	Barcelona to Barcelona	95.1 km (59.1 mi)	Hilly stage	Brady Gilmore (AUS)
Total			1,059.1 km (658.1 mi)		

== Stages ==
=== Stage 1 ===
23 March 2026 — Sant Feliu de Guíxols to Sant Feliu de Guíxols, 172.6 km (107.2 mi)

Stage 1 Result (1–10)
Rank	Rider	Team	Time
1	Dorian Godon (FRA)	INEOS Grenadiers	4h 01' 09"
2	Remco Evenepoel (BEL)	Red Bull–Bora–Hansgrohe	+ 0"
3	Tom Pidcock (GBR)	Pinarello–Q36.5 Pro Cycling Team	+ 0"
4	Guillermo Thomas Silva (URU)	XDS Astana Team	+ 0"
5	Simone Gualdi (ITA)	Lotto–Intermarché	+ 0"
6	Lenny Martinez (FRA)	Team Bahrain Victorious	+ 0"
7	Andrea Raccagni (ITA)	Soudal–Quick-Step	+ 0"
8	Henri Uhlig (GER)	Alpecin–Premier Tech	+ 0"
9	Oscar Onley (GBR)	INEOS Grenadiers	+ 0"
10	Antoine L'Hote (FRA)	Decathlon CMA CGM	+ 0"

General classification after Stage 1 (1–10)
Rank	Rider	Team	Time
1	Dorian Godon (FRA)	INEOS Grenadiers	4h 01' 09"
2	Remco Evenepoel (BEL)	Red Bull–Bora–Hansgrohe	+ 4"
3	Tom Pidcock (GBR)	Pinarello–Q36.5 Pro Cycling Team	+ 6"
4	Guillermo Thomas Silva (URU)	XDS Astana Team	+ 10"
5	Simone Gualdi (ITA)	Lotto–Intermarché	+ 10"
6	Lenny Martinez (FRA)	Team Bahrain Victorious	+ 10"
7	Andrea Raccagni (ITA)	Soudal–Quick-Step	+ 10"
8	Henri Uhlig (GER)	Alpecin–Premier Tech	+ 10"
9	Oscar Onley (GBR)	INEOS Grenadiers	+ 10"
10	Antoine L'Hote (FRA)	Decathlon CMA CGM	+ 10"

=== Stage 2 ===
24 March 2026 — Figueres to Banyoles, 167.4 km (104.0 mi)

Stage 2 Result (1–10)
Rank	Rider	Team	Time
1	Magnus Cort (DEN)	Uno-X Mobility	3h 45' 28"
2	Noa Isidore (FRA)	Decathlon CMA CGM	+ 0"
3	Francesco Busatto (ITA)	Alpecin–Premier Tech	+ 0"
4	Dorian Godon (FRA)	INEOS Grenadiers	+ 0"
5	Alberto Dainese (ITA)	Soudal–Quick-Step	+ 0"
6	Guillermo Thomas Silva (URU)	XDS Astana Team	+ 0"
7	Noah Hobbs (GBR)	EF Education–EasyPost	+ 0"
8	Ivo Oliveira (POR)	UAE Team Emirates XRG	+ 0"
9	Toon Aerts (BEL)	Lotto–Intermarché	+ 0"
10	Sergi Darder (ESP)	Caja Rural–Seguros RGA	+ 0"

General classification after Stage 2 (1–10)
Rank	Rider	Team	Time
1	Dorian Godon (FRA)	INEOS Grenadiers	7h 46' 27"
2	Magnus Cort (DEN)	Uno-X Mobility	+ 4"
3	Remco Evenepoel (BEL)	Red Bull–Bora–Hansgrohe	+ 4"
4	Tom Pidcock (GBR)	Pinarello–Q36.5 Pro Cycling Team	+ 6"
5	Guillermo Thomas Silva (URU)	XDS Astana Team	+ 10"
6	Andrea Raccagni (ITA)	Soudal–Quick-Step	+ 10"
7	Antoine L'Hote (FRA)	Decathlon CMA CGM	+ 10"
8	Lenny Martinez (FRA)	Team Bahrain Victorious	+ 10"
9	Rudy Molard (FRA)	Groupama–FDJ United	+ 10"
10	Anthon Charmig (DEN)	Uno-X Mobility	+ 10"

=== Stage 3 ===
25 March 2026 — Costa Daurada (Mont-roig del Camp) to Costa Daurada (Vila-seca), 159.5 km (99.1 mi)

Stage 3 Result (1–10)
Rank	Rider	Team	Time
1	Dorian Godon (FRA)	INEOS Grenadiers	3h 43' 33"
2	Ethan Vernon (GBR)	NSN Cycling Team	+ 0"
3	Noah Hobbs (GBR)	EF Education–EasyPost	+ 0"
4	Toon Aerts (BEL)	Lotto–Intermarché	+ 0"
5	Anthon Charmig (DEN)	Uno-X Mobility	+ 0"
6	Tom Pidcock (GBR)	Pinarello–Q36.5 Pro Cycling Team	+ 0"
7	Noa Isidore (FRA)	Decathlon CMA CGM	+ 0"
8	Davide Piganzoli (ITA)	Visma–Lease a Bike	+ 0"
9	Michel Hessmann (GER)	Movistar Team	+ 0"
10	Mark Stewart (GBR)	Modern Adventure Pro Cycling	+ 0"

General classification after Stage 3 (1–10)
Rank	Rider	Team	Time
1	Dorian Godon (FRA)	INEOS Grenadiers	11h 29' 50"
2	Remco Evenepoel (BEL)	Red Bull–Bora–Hansgrohe	+ 11"
3	Tom Pidcock (GBR)	Pinarello–Q36.5 Pro Cycling Team	+ 16"
4	Jonas Vingegaard (DEN)	Visma–Lease a Bike	+ 18"
5	Brandon McNulty (USA)	UAE Team Emirates XRG	+ 10"
6	Anthon Charmig (DEN)	Uno-X Mobility	+ 20"
7	Rudy Molard (FRA)	Groupama–FDJ United	+ 20"
8	Oscar Onley (GBR)	INEOS Grenadiers	+ 20"
9	Antoine L'Hote (FRA)	Decathlon CMA CGM	+ 20"
10	Jai Hindley (AUS)	Red Bull–Bora–Hansgrohe	+ 20"

=== Stage 4 ===
26 March 2026 — Mataró to Camprodon, 151 km (94 mi)

Stage 4 Result (1–10)
Rank	Rider	Team	Time
1	Ethan Vernon (GBR)	NSN Cycling Team	4h 01' 03"
2	Dorian Godon (FRA)	INEOS Grenadiers	+ 0"
3	Tom Pidcock (GBR)	Pinarello–Q36.5 Pro Cycling Team	+ 0"
4	Brandon McNulty (USA)	UAE Team Emirates XRG	+ 0"
5	Magnus Cort (DEN)	Uno-X Mobility	+ 0"
6	David González (ESP)	Pinarello–Q36.5 Pro Cycling Team	+ 0"
7	Mathieu Kockelmann (LUX)	Lotto–Intermarché	+ 0"
8	Alberto Dainese (ITA)	Soudal–Quick-Step	+ 0"
9	Noah Hobbs (GBR)	EF Education–EasyPost	+ 0"
10	Mark Stewart (GBR)	Modern Adventure Pro Cycling	+ 0"

General classification after Stage 4 (1–10)
Rank	Rider	Team	Time
1	Dorian Godon (FRA)	INEOS Grenadiers	15h 30' 47"
2	Tom Pidcock (GBR)	Pinarello–Q36.5 Pro Cycling Team	+ 13"
3	Remco Evenepoel (BEL)	Red Bull–Bora–Hansgrohe	+ 14"
4	Jonas Vingegaard (DEN)	Visma–Lease a Bike	+ 24"
5	Simone Gualdi (ITA)	Lotto–Intermarché	+ 24"
6	Andrea Raccagni (ITA)	Soudal–Quick-Step	+ 25"
7	Brandon McNulty (USA)	UAE Team Emirates XRG	+ 25"
8	Rudy Molard (FRA)	Groupama–FDJ United	+ 26"
9	Antoine L'Hote (FRA)	Decathlon CMA CGM	+ 26"
10	Ben O'Connor (AUS)	Team Jayco–AlUla	+ 26"

=== Stage 5 ===
27 March 2026 — La Seu d'Urgell to La Molina (Coll de Pal), 153.1 km (95.1 mi)

Stage 5 Result (1–10)
Rank	Rider	Team	Time
1	Jonas Vingegaard (DEN)	Visma–Lease a Bike	4h 13' 44"
2	Felix Gall (AUT)	Decathlon CMA CGM	+ 51"
3	Lenny Martinez (FRA)	Team Bahrain Victorious	+ 1' 01"
4	Florian Lipowitz (GER)	Red Bull–Bora–Hansgrohe	+ 1' 01"
5	Valentin Paret-Peintre (FRA)	Soudal–Quick-Step	+ 1' 03"
6	Remco Evenepoel (BEL)	Red Bull–Bora–Hansgrohe	+ 1' 38"
7	Mattias Skjelmose (DEN)	Lidl–Trek	+ 1' 39"
8	Lorenzo Fortunato (ITA)	XDS Astana Team	+ 1' 39"
9	Cian Uijtdebroeks (BEL)	Movistar Team	+ 1' 39"
10	Ben O'Connor (AUS)	Team Jayco–AlUla	+ 1' 39"

General classification after Stage 5 (1–10)
Rank	Rider	Team	Time
1	Jonas Vingegaard (DEN)	Visma–Lease a Bike	19h 44' 45"
2	Felix Gall (AUT)	Decathlon CMA CGM	+ 57"
3	Lenny Martinez (FRA)	Team Bahrain Victorious	+ 1' 09"
4	Florian Lipowitz (GER)	Red Bull–Bora–Hansgrohe	+ 1' 13"
5	Valentin Paret-Peintre (FRA)	Soudal–Quick-Step	+ 1' 15"
6	Remco Evenepoel (BEL)	Red Bull–Bora–Hansgrohe	+ 1' 38"
7	Ben O'Connor (AUS)	Team Jayco–AlUla	+ 1' 51"
8	Mattias Skjelmose (DEN)	Lidl–Trek	+ 1' 51"
9	Cian Uijtdebroeks (BEL)	Movistar Team	+ 1' 51"
10	Lorenzo Fortunato (ITA)	XDS Astana Team	+ 1' 51"

=== Stage 6 ===
28 March 2026 — Berga to Queralt, 158.2 km (98.3 mi)

Stage 6 Result (1–10)
Rank	Rider	Team	Time
1	Jonas Vingegaard (DEN)	Visma–Lease a Bike	4h 05' 19"
2	Lenny Martinez (FRA)	Team Bahrain Victorious	+ 10"
3	Florian Lipowitz (GER)	Red Bull–Bora–Hansgrohe	+ 10"
4	Valentin Paret-Peintre (FRA)	Soudal–Quick-Step	+ 16"
5	Remco Evenepoel (BEL)	Red Bull–Bora–Hansgrohe	+ 27"
6	Richard Carapaz (ECU)	EF Education–EasyPost	+ 1' 29"
7	Felix Gall (AUT)	Decathlon CMA CGM	+ 2' 08"
8	Mattias Skjelmose (DEN)	Lidl–Trek	+ 2' 08"
9	Afonso Eulálio (POR)	Team Bahrain Victorious	+ 2' 55"
10	Matthew Riccitello (USA)	Decathlon CMA CGM	+ 3' 16"

General classification after Stage 6 (1–10)
Rank	Rider	Team	Time
1	Jonas Vingegaard (DEN)	Visma–Lease a Bike	23h 49' 52"
2	Lenny Martinez (FRA)	Team Bahrain Victorious	+ 1' 22"
3	Florian Lipowitz (GER)	Red Bull–Bora–Hansgrohe	+ 1' 30"
4	Valentin Paret-Peintre (FRA)	Soudal–Quick-Step	+ 1' 43"
5	Remco Evenepoel (BEL)	Red Bull–Bora–Hansgrohe	+ 2' 17"
6	Felix Gall (AUT)	Decathlon CMA CGM	+ 3' 17"
7	Mattias Skjelmose (DEN)	Lidl–Trek	+ 4' 11"
8	Cian Uijtdebroeks (BEL)	Movistar Team	+ 5' 20"
9	Matthew Riccitello (USA)	Decathlon CMA CGM	+ 5' 25"
10	Richard Carapaz (ECU)	EF Education–EasyPost	+ 5' 36"

=== Stage 7 ===
29 March 2026 — Barcelona to Barcelona, 95.1 km (59.1 mi)

Stage 7 Result (1–10)
Rank	Rider	Team	Time
1	Brady Gilmore (AUS)	NSN Cycling Team	2h 06' 44"
2	Dorian Godon (FRA)	INEOS Grenadiers	+ 0"
3	Remco Evenepoel (BEL)	Red Bull–Bora–Hansgrohe	+ 0"
4	David González (SPA)	Pinarello–Q36.5 Pro Cycling Team	+ 0"
5	Antoine L'Hote (FRA)	Decathlon CMA CGM	+ 0"
6	Senna Remijn (NED)	Alpecin–Premier Tech	+ 0"
7	Luca Vergallito (ITA)	Alpecin–Premier Tech	+ 0"
8	Simone Gualdi (ITA)	Lotto–Intermarché	+ 0"
9	Lenny Martinez (FRA)	Team Bahrain Victorious	+ 0"
10	Henok Mulubrhan (ERI)	XDS Astana Team	+ 0"

General classification after Stage 7 (1–10)
Rank	Rider	Team	Time
1	Jonas Vingegaard (DEN)	Visma–Lease a Bike	25h 56' 36"
2	Lenny Martinez (FRA)	Team Bahrain Victorious	+ 1' 22"
3	Florian Lipowitz (GER)	Red Bull–Bora–Hansgrohe	+ 1' 30"
4	Valentin Paret-Peintre (FRA)	Soudal–Quick-Step	+ 1' 43"
5	Remco Evenepoel (BEL)	Red Bull–Bora–Hansgrohe	+ 2' 13"
6	Felix Gall (AUT)	Decathlon CMA CGM	+ 3' 17"
7	Mattias Skjelmose (DEN)	Lidl–Trek	+ 4' 11"
8	Cian Uijtdebroeks (BEL)	Movistar Team	+ 5' 20"
9	Matthew Riccitello (USA)	Decathlon CMA CGM	+ 5' 25"
10	Richard Carapaz (ECU)	EF Education–EasyPost	+ 5' 36"

== Classification leadership table ==
Classification leadership by stage
Stage	Winner	General classification	Points classification	Mountains classification	Young rider classification	Team classification	Combativity award
1	Dorian Godon	Dorian Godon	Dorian Godon	Baptiste Veistroffer	Simone Gualdi	INEOS Grenadiers	Baptiste Veistroffer
2	Magnus Cort	Dorian Godon	Baptiste Veistroffer	Baptiste Veistroffer	Andrea Raccagni	INEOS Grenadiers	Samuel Fernández
3	Dorian Godon	Dorian Godon	Dorian Godon	Baptiste Veistroffer	Antoine L'Hote	INEOS Grenadiers	Diego Uriarte
4	Ethan Vernon	Dorian Godon	Dorian Godon	Baptiste Veistroffer	Simone Gualdi	INEOS Grenadiers	Samuel Fernández
5	Jonas Vingegaard	Jonas Vingegaard	Dorian Godon	Baptiste Veistroffer	Lenny Martinez	Visma–Lease a Bike	Giulio Ciccone
6	Jonas Vingegaard	Jonas Vingegaard	Dorian Godon	Giulio Ciccone	Lenny Martinez	Red Bull–Bora–Hansgrohe	Giulio Ciccone
7	Brady Gilmore	Jonas Vingegaard	Dorian Godon	Giulio Ciccone	Lenny Martinez	Red Bull–Bora–Hansgrohe	Baptiste Veistroffer
Final		Jonas Vingegaard	Dorian Godon	Giulio Ciccone	Lenny Martinez	Red Bull–Bora–Hansgrohe	Not awarded

== Classification standings ==
Legend
Denotes the winner of the general classification	Denotes the winner of the young rider classification
Denotes the winner of the points classification	Denotes the winner of the team classification
Denotes the winner of the mountains classification	Denotes the winner of the combativity award

=== General classification ===
Final general classification (1–10)
Rank	Rider	Team	Time
1	Jonas Vingegaard (DEN)	Visma–Lease a Bike	25h 56' 36"
2	Lenny Martinez (FRA)	Team Bahrain Victorious	+ 1' 22"
3	Florian Lipowitz (GER)	Red Bull–Bora–Hansgrohe	+ 1' 30"
4	Valentin Paret-Peintre (FRA)	Soudal–Quick-Step	+ 1' 43"
5	Remco Evenepoel (BEL)	Red Bull–Bora–Hansgrohe	+ 2' 13"
6	Felix Gall (AUT)	Decathlon CMA CGM	+ 3' 17"
7	Mattias Skjelmose (DEN)	Lidl–Trek	+ 4' 11"
8	Cian Uijtdebroeks (BEL)	Movistar Team	+ 5' 20"
9	Matthew Riccitello (USA)	Decathlon CMA CGM	+ 5' 25"
10	Richard Carapaz (ECU)	EF Education–EasyPost	+ 5' 36"

=== Points classification ===
Final points classification (1-10)
Rank	Rider	Team	Points
1	Dorian Godon (FRA)	INEOS Grenadiers	32
2	Jonas Vingegaard (DEN)	Visma–Lease a Bike	24
3	Baptiste Veistroffer (FRA)	Lotto–Intermarché	18
4	Ethan Vernon (GBR)	NSN Cycling Team	16
5	Remco Evenepoel (BEL)	Red Bull–Bora–Hansgrohe	16
6	Magnus Cort (DEN)	Uno-X Mobility	13
7	Lenny Martinez (FRA)	Team Bahrain Victorious	13
8	Liam Slock (BEL)	Lotto–Intermarché	12
9	Brady Gilmore (AUS)	NSN Cycling Team	10
10	Giulio Ciccone (ITA)	Lidl–Trek	6

=== Mountains classification ===
Final mountains classification (1–10)
Rank	Rider	Team	Points
1	Giulio Ciccone (ITA)	Lidl–Trek	73
2	Marc Soler (ESP)	UAE Team Emirates XRG	61
3	Jonas Vingegaard (DEN)	Visma–Lease a Bike	44
4	Baptiste Veistroffer (FRA)	Lotto–Intermarché	39
5	Remco Evenepoel (BEL)	Red Bull–Bora–Hansgrohe	27
6	Lenny Martinez (FRA)	Team Bahrain Victorious	27
7	Embret Svestad-Bårdseng (NOR)	INEOS Grenadiers	24
8	Davide Piganzoli (ITA)	Visma–Lease a Bike	22
9	Florian Lipowitz (GER)	Red Bull–Bora–Hansgrohe	21
10	Felix Gall (AUT)	Decathlon CMA CGM	20

=== Young rider classification ===
Final young rider classification (1–10)
Rank	Rider	Team	Time
1	Lenny Martinez (FRA)	Team Bahrain Victorious	25h 57' 58"
2	Cian Uijtdebroeks (BEL)	Movistar Team	+ 3' 58"
3	Jaume Guardeño (ESP)	Caja Rural–Seguros RGA	+ 14' 31"
4	Jan Castellon (ESP)	Caja Rural–Seguros RGA	+ 18' 02"
5	Jakob Omrzel (SLO)	Team Bahrain Victorious	+ 28' 48"
6	Adrià Pericas (ESP)	UAE Team Emirates XRG	+ 29' 14"
7	Simone Gualdi (ITA)	Lotto–Intermarché	+ 34' 19"
8	Maxime Decomble (FRA)	Groupama–FDJ United	+ 34' 56"
9	Léo Bisiaux (FRA)	Decathlon CMA CGM	+ 35' 22"
10	Jørgen Nordhagen (NOR)	Visma–Lease a Bike	+ 35' 51"

=== Team classification ===
Final team classification (1–10)
Rank	Team	Time
1	(Germany) Red Bull–Bora–Hansgrohe	78h 03' 12"
2	(France) Decathlon CMA CGM	+ 5' 39"
3	(Netherlands) Visma–Lease a Bike	+ 7' 29"
4	(Belgium) Soudal–Quick-Step	+ 8' 40"
5	(Spain) Movistar Team	+ 11' 28"
6	Team Bahrain Victorious	+ 13' 26"
7	(Spain) Caja Rural–Seguros RGA	+ 21' 09"
8	(Kazakhstan) XDS Astana Team	+ 22' 53"
9	(United Kingdom) INEOS Grenadiers	+ 24' 47"
10	(United States) EF Education–EasyPost	+ 39' 31"
