= 2026 Volta a Portugal =

2026 Tour of Portugal
2026 UCI Europe Tour

Race details
- Dates: 5–16 August 2026
- Stages: 11
- Distance: 1,430.1 km (888.6 mi)

The 87th edition of the Tour of Portugal Jogos Santa Casa, organized by the Portuguese Cycling Federation, takes place from 5 to 16 August 2026. The race, which is part of the 2026 UCI Europe Tour calendar as a category 2.1 event, consists of a prologue and ten stages, including an individual time trial.

== Presentation ==
This edition was presented on Wednesday, 8 July, at Alto da Senhora da Graça, in Mondim de Basto, unveiling an edition that marks the beginning of a new era for Portugal's premier cycling race.
On the road to its centenary, which will be celebrated in 2027, the Tour features a demanding and balanced route designed to provide exciting racing from the opening day to the finale.
Over 12 days, the race will pass through 71 municipalities, make a brief incursion into Spain, return to iconic locations in Portuguese cycling, and introduce several new features that promise to leave a lasting mark on the recent history of the race.

=== Route ===
The Tour of Portugal begins with a prologue in the city of Lisbon, before heading south to the Algarve, finishing in Albufeira at the end of Stage 2.
After crossing the Alentejo region, the riders face their first major challenge with the legendary climb to Alto da Torre in the Serra da Estrela during Stage 4.
The opening week concludes with an individual time trial between Anadia and Águeda, in the Aveiro Region, before the rest day on 11 August.
The second half of the Tour features five stages in the Northern Region of the country, including a visit to the Peneda-Gerês National Park and a brief incursion into Spain during Stage 7.
After finishing in Fafe, one of the most iconic towns in the history of the Volta a Portugal, the riders will tackle, for the first time in the race's history, the famous Alto da Senhora da Graça climb twice during Stage 9 in Mondim de Basto.
The 87th edition of the Tour of Portugal concludes in the Porto District with a finish on Avenida dos Aliados in Porto.

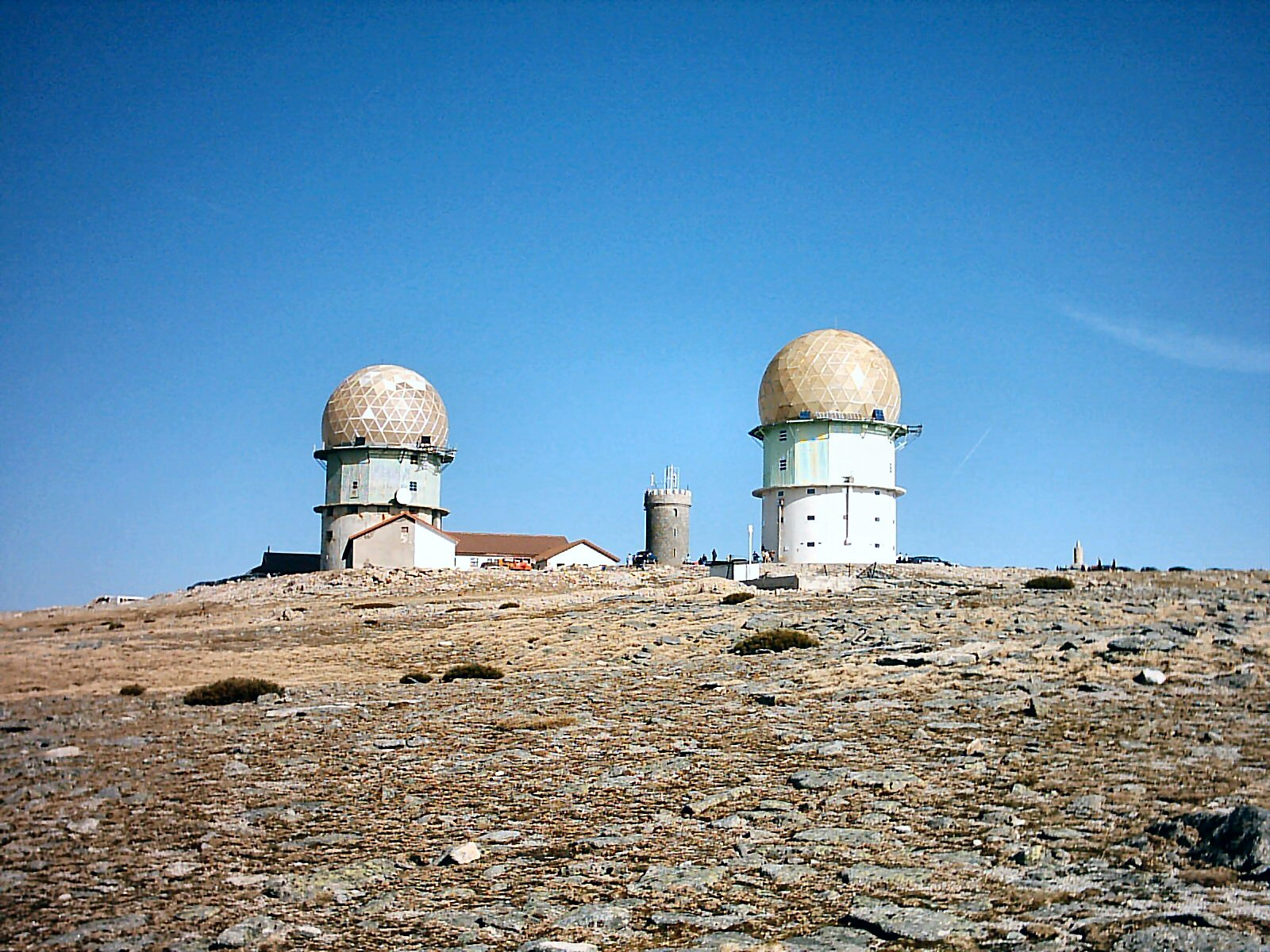
Alto da Torre, the summit finish of Stage 4.

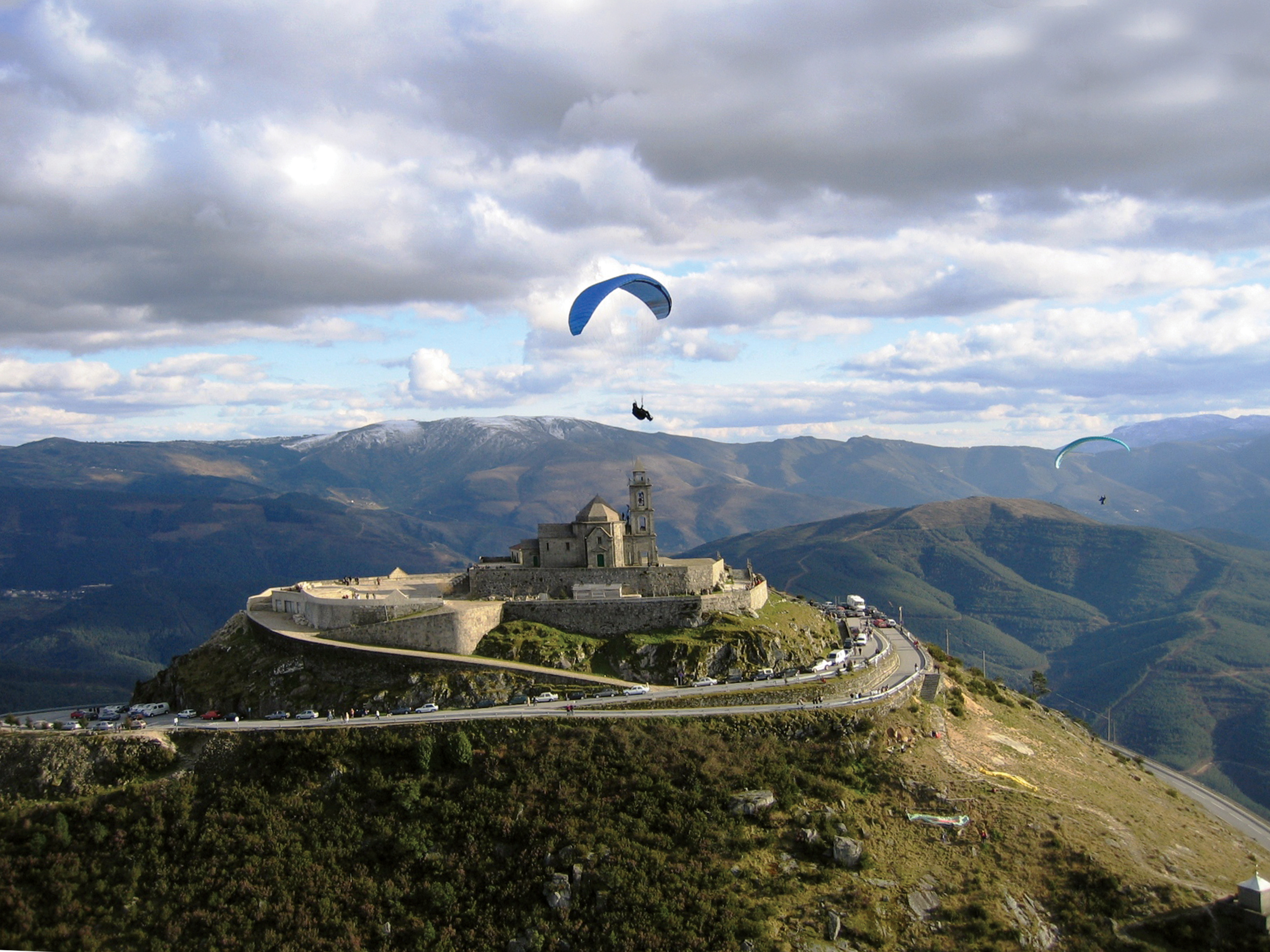
Alto da Senhora da Graça, the summit finish of Stage 9.

=== Teams ===
UCI WorldTeams

- UAE Team Emirates XRG

UCI ProTeams

- Burgos Burpellet BH
- Caja Rural–Seguros RGA

UCI Continental Teams

- Aviludo–Louletano–Loulé
- Anicolor / Campicarn
- Credibom / LA Alumínios / Marcos Car
- Efapel Cycling
- Feira dos Sofás–Boavista
- Feirense–Beeceler
- GI Group Holding–Simoldes–UDO
- Tavfer–Ovos Matinados–Mortágua
- Team Tavira / Crédito Agrícola

== Stages ==
The 2026 Tour of Portugal consists of eleven stages covering a total distance of 1,388 kilometres (862 mi). A rest day is scheduled for 11 August.

== Race progress ==
=== Prologue ===
5 August 2026 — Lisbon – Lisbon, 6.5 km (4.0 mi)

Prologue Result
Rank	Rider	Team	Time
1	Julius Johansen (DEN)	UAE Team Emirates XRG	7' 12"
2	Rui Oliveira (POR)	UAE Team Emirates XRG	+ 4"
3	Rafael Reis (POR)	Anicolor / Campicarn	+ 7"
4	Luca Giaimi (ITA)	UAE Team Emirates XRG	+ 9"
5	Artem Nych (RUS)	Anicolor / Campicarn	+ 13"
6	Axel van der Tuuk (NED)	Euskaltel–Euskadi	+ 14"
7	Txomin Juaristi (ESP)	Euskaltel–Euskadi	+ 15"
8	Carlos Salgueiro (POR)	Team Tavira / Crédito Agrícola	+ 16"
9	Tiago Antunes (POR)	Efapel Cycling	+ 17"
10	Filipe Francisco (POR)	Aviludo–Louletano–Loulé	+ 17"

General classification after Prologue
Rank	Rider	Team	Time
1	Julius Johansen (DEN)	UAE Team Emirates XRG	7' 12"
2	Rui Oliveira (POR)	UAE Team Emirates XRG	+ 4"
3	Rafael Reis (POR)	Anicolor / Campicarn	+ 7"
4	Luca Giaimi (ITA)	UAE Team Emirates XRG	+ 9"
5	Artem Nych (RUS)	Anicolor / Campicarn	+ 13"
6	Axel van der Tuuk (NED)	Euskaltel–Euskadi	+ 14"
7	Txomin Juaristi (ESP)	Euskaltel–Euskadi	+ 15"
8	Carlos Salgueiro (POR)	Team Tavira / Crédito Agrícola	+ 16"
9	Tiago Antunes (POR)	Efapel Cycling	+ 17"
10	Filipe Francisco (POR)	Aviludo–Louletano–Loulé	+ 17"

=== Stage 1 ===
6 August 2026 — Lourinhã – Queluz, 157.1 km (97.6 mi)

Stage 1 Result
Rank	Rider	Team	Time
1	Francisco Campos (POR)	Team Tavira / Crédito Agrícola	3h 39' 08"
2	Daniel Cavia (ESP)	Burgos Burpellet BH	+ 0"
3	Carlos Salgueiro (POR)	Team Tavira / Crédito Agrícola	+ 0"
4	Rui Oliveira (POR)	UAE Team Emirates XRG	+ 2"
5	Axel van der Tuuk (NED)	Euskaltel–Euskadi	+ 2"
6	Tomas Contte (ARG)	Aviludo–Louletano–Loulé	+ 2"
7	Fábio Costa (POR)	Feira dos Sofás–Boavista	+ 2"
8	Pedro Silva (POR)	Feira dos Sofás–Boavista	+ 2"
9	Henrique Avancini (BRA)	Localiza Meoo / Swift Pro Cycling	+ 2"
10	João Medeiros (POR)	Credibom / LA Alumínios / Marcos Car	+ 2"

General classification after Stage 1
Rank	Rider	Team	Time
1	Rui Oliveira (POR)	UAE Team Emirates XRG	3h 46' 24"
2	Rafael Reis (POR)	Anicolor / Campicarn	+ 3"
3	Carlos Salgueiro (POR)	Team Tavira / Crédito Agrícola	+ 9"
4	Artem Nych (RUS)	Anicolor / Campicarn	+ 10"
5	Axel van der Tuuk (NED)	Euskaltel–Euskadi	+ 11"
6	Txomin Juaristi (ESP)	Euskaltel–Euskadi	+ 11"
7	Tiago Antunes (POR)	Efapel Cycling	+ 13"
8	Emanuel Duarte (POR)	Credibom / LA Alumínios / Marcos Car	+ 17"
9	Adrià Pericas (ESP)	UAE Team Emirates XRG	+ 17"
10	Fábio Costa (POR)	Feira dos Sofás–Boavista	+ 21"

=== Stage 2 ===
7 August 2026 — Sines – Albufeira, 180.4 km (112.1 mi)

Stage 2 Result
Rank	Rider	Team	Time
1	Santiago Mesa (COL)	Anicolor / Campicarn	3h 59' 08"
2	Daniel Cavia (ESP)	Burgos Burpellet BH	+ 0"
3	Tomas Contte (ARG)	Aviludo–Louletano–Loulé	+ 0"
4	Xabier Isasa (ESP)	Euskaltel–Euskadi	+ 0"
5	Francisco Campos (POR)	Team Tavira / Crédito Agrícola	+ 0"
6	Rui Oliveira (POR)	UAE Team Emirates XRG	+ 0"
7	Jordi Lopez (ESP)	Euskaltel–Euskadi	+ 0"
8	Carlos Salgueiro (POR)	Team Tavira / Crédito Agrícola	+ 0"
9	Pedro Silva (POR)	Feira dos Sofás–Boavista	+ 0"
10	João Martins (POR)	Credibom / LA Alumínios / Marcos Car	+ 0"

General classification after Stage 2
Rank	Rider	Team	Time
1	Rui Oliveira (POR)	UAE Team Emirates XRG	7h 45' 32"
2	Rafael Reis (POR)	Anicolor / Campicarn	+ 3"
3	Carlos Salgueiro (POR)	Team Tavira / Crédito Agrícola	+ 9"
4	Artem Nych (RUS)	Anicolor / Campicarn	+ 10"
5	Axel van der Tuuk (NED)	Euskaltel–Euskadi	+ 11"
6	Txomin Juaristi (ESP)	Euskaltel–Euskadi	+ 11"
7	Tiago Antunes (POR)	Efapel Cycling	+ 13"
8	Emanuel Duarte (POR)	Credibom / LA Alumínios / Marcos Car	+ 17"
9	Adrià Pericas (ESP)	UAE Team Emirates XRG	+ 17"
10	Fábio Costa (POR)	Feira dos Sofás–Boavista	+ 21"

=== Stage 3 ===
8 August 2026 — Beja – Elvas, 182.2 km (113.2 mi)

Stage 3 Result
Rank	Rider	Team	Time
1	Leangel Linarez (VEN)	Tavfer–Ovos Matinados–Mortágua	4h 21' 42"
2	João Matias (POR)	Tavfer–Ovos Matinados–Mortágua	+ 0"
3	Tomas Contte (ARG)	Aviludo–Louletano–Loulé	+ 0"
4	Iker Bonillo (ESP)	Feira dos Sofás–Boavista	+ 0"
5	Rui Oliveira (POR)	UAE Team Emirates XRG	+ 0"
6	Daniel Cavia (ESP)	Burgos Burpellet BH	+ 0"
7	Santiago Mesa (COL)	Anicolor / Campicarn	+ 0"
8	Itamar Einhorn (ISR)	NSN Cycling Team	+ 0"
9	Alvaro Navas (ESP)	Óbidos Cycling Team	+ 0"
10	Francisco Campos (POR)	Team Tavira / Crédito Agrícola	+ 0"

General classification after Stage 3
Rank	Rider	Team	Time
1	Rui Oliveira (POR)	UAE Team Emirates XRG	12h 07' 14"
2	Rafael Reis (POR)	Anicolor / Campicarn	+ 3"
3	Carlos Salgueiro (POR)	Team Tavira / Crédito Agrícola	+ 9"
4	Artem Nych (RUS)	Anicolor / Campicarn	+ 10"
5	Axel van der Tuuk (NED)	Euskaltel–Euskadi	+ 11"
6	Txomin Juaristi (ESP)	Euskaltel–Euskadi	+ 11"
7	Tiago Antunes (POR)	Efapel Cycling	+ 13"
8	Emanuel Duarte (POR)	Credibom / LA Alumínios / Marcos Car	+ 17"
9	Adrià Pericas (ESP)	UAE Team Emirates XRG	+ 17"
10	Fábio Costa (POR)	Feira dos Sofás–Boavista	+ 21"

=== Stage 4 ===
9 August 2026 — Figueiró dos Vinhos – Covilhã (Torre), 154.6 km (96.1 mi)

Stage 4 Result
Rank	Rider	Team	Time
1	Alexis Guérin (FRA)	Anicolor / Campicarn	4h 09' 49"
2	Artem Nych (RUS)	Anicolor / Campicarn	+ 1' 44"
3	Pedro Silva (POR)	Feira dos Sofás–Boavista	+ 1' 56"
4	Jokin Murguialday (ESP)	Euskaltel–Euskadi	+ 1' 58"
5	José Fernandes (POR)	GI Group Holding–Simoldes–UDO	+ 1' 58"
6	Abner González (PUR)	Feirense–Beeceler	+ 2' 17"
7	Rafael Barbas (POR)	Tavfer–Ovos Matinados–Mortágua	+ 2' 18"
8	Louis Ferreira (FRA)	Anicolor / Campicarn	+ 2' 20"
9	Emanuel Duarte (POR)	Credibom / LA Alumínios / Marcos Car	+ 2' 20"
10	Jesús David Peña (COL)	Efapel Cycling	+ 2' 20"

General classification after Stage 4
Rank	Rider	Team	Time
1	Alexis Guérin (FRA)	Anicolor / Campicarn	16h 17' 25"
2	Artem Nych (RUS)	Anicolor / Campicarn	+ 1' 26"
3	José Fernandes (POR)	GI Group Holding–Simoldes–UDO	+ 1' 58"
4	Pedro Silva (POR)	Feira dos Sofás–Boavista	+ 2' 01"
5	Txomin Juaristi (ESP)	Euskaltel–Euskadi	+ 2' 09"
6	Jokin Murguialday (ESP)	Euskaltel–Euskadi	+ 2' 15"
7	Emanuel Duarte (POR)	Credibom / LA Alumínios / Marcos Car	+ 2' 15"
8	Tiago Antunes (POR)	Efapel Cycling	+ 2' 15"
9	Adrià Pericas (ESP)	UAE Team Emirates XRG	+ 2' 19"
10	Fábio Costa (POR)	Feira dos Sofás–Boavista	+ 2' 21"

=== Stage 5 ===
10 August 2026 — Anadia – Águeda, 17.4 km (10.8 mi)

Stage 5 Result
Rank	Rider	Team	Time
1	Julius Johansen (DEN)	UAE Team Emirates XRG	21' 13"
2	Tiago Antunes (POR)	Efapel Cycling	+ 30"
3	Axel van der Tuuk (NED)	Euskaltel–Euskadi	+ 35"
4	Artem Nych (RUS)	Anicolor / Campicarn	+ 39"
5	Luca Giaimi (ITA)	UAE Team Emirates XRG	+ 43"
6	Enzo Leijnse (NED)	Anicolor / Campicarn	+ 45"
7	Rafael Reis (POR)	Anicolor / Campicarn	+ 47"
8	Alexis Guérin (FRA)	Anicolor / Campicarn	+ 53"
9	José Fernandes (POR)	GI Group Holding–Simoldes–UDO	+ 58"
10	Adrià Pericas (ESP)	UAE Team Emirates XRG	+ 1' 00"

General classification after Stage 5
Rank	Rider	Team	Time
1	Alexis Guérin (FRA)	Anicolor / Campicarn	16h 39' 31"
2	Artem Nych (RUS)	Anicolor / Campicarn	+ 1' 12"
3	Tiago Antunes (POR)	Efapel Cycling	+ 1' 52"
4	José Fernandes (POR)	GI Group Holding–Simoldes–UDO	+ 2' 04"
5	Adrià Pericas (ESP)	UAE Team Emirates XRG	+ 2' 26"
6	Emanuel Duarte (POR)	Credibom / LA Alumínios / Marcos Car	+ 2' 28"
7	Pedro Silva (POR)	Feira dos Sofás–Boavista	+ 2' 49"
8	Jokin Murguialday (ESP)	Euskaltel–Euskadi	+ 2' 53"
9	Fábio Costa (POR)	Feira dos Sofás–Boavista	+ 3' 00"
10	Txomin Juaristi (ESP)	Euskaltel–Euskadi	+ 3' 03"

=== Stage 6 ===
12 August 2026 — Santa Maria da Feira – Peso da Régua, 132.6 km (82.4 mi)

Stage 6 Result
Rank	Rider	Team	Time
1	Xabier Isasa (ESP)	Euskaltel–Euskadi	3h 01' 23"
2	Rui Oliveira (POR)	UAE Team Emirates XRG	+ 0"
3	Francisco Campos (POR)	Team Tavira / Crédito Agrícola	+ 0"
4	Tiago Antunes (POR)	Efapel Cycling	+ 0"
5	Artem Nych (RUS)	Anicolor / Campicarn	+ 0"
6	Jesus del Pino (ESP)	Aviludo–Louletano–Loulé	+ 0"
7	Adrián Bustamante (COL)	GI Group Holding–Simoldes–UDO	+ 0"
8	Adrià Pericas (ESP)	UAE Team Emirates XRG	+ 0"
9	Txomin Juaristi (ESP)	Euskaltel–Euskadi	+ 0"
10	Diogo Barbosa (POR)	Team Tavira / Crédito Agrícola	+ 0"

General classification after Stage 6
Rank	Rider	Team	Time
1	Alexis Guérin (FRA)	Anicolor / Campicarn	19h 41' 17"
2	Artem Nych (RUS)	Anicolor / Campicarn	+ 49"
3	Tiago Antunes (POR)	Efapel Cycling	+ 1' 28"
4	Adrià Pericas (ESP)	UAE Team Emirates XRG	+ 2' 03"
5	José Fernandes (POR)	GI Group Holding–Simoldes–UDO	+ 2' 04"
6	Emanuel Duarte (POR)	Credibom / LA Alumínios / Marcos Car	+ 2' 28"
7	Txomin Juaristi (ESP)	Euskaltel–Euskadi	+ 2' 40"
8	Pedro Silva (POR)	Feira dos Sofás–Boavista	+ 2' 49"
9	Jokin Murguialday (ESP)	Euskaltel–Euskadi	+ 2' 53"
10	Fábio Costa (POR)	Feira dos Sofás–Boavista	+ 3' 00"

=== Stage 7 ===
13 August 2026 — Vieira do Minho – Gerês, 153 km (95 mi)

Stage 7 Result
Rank	Rider	Team	Time
1	Adrià Pericas (ESP)	UAE Team Emirates XRG	3h 48' 32"
2	Artem Nych (RUS)	Anicolor / Campicarn	+ 0"
3	Alexis Guérin (FRA)	Anicolor / Campicarn	+ 0"
4	Pedro Silva (POR)	Feira dos Sofás–Boavista	+ 28"
5	José Fernandes (POR)	GI Group Holding–Simoldes–UDO	+ 2' 21"
6	Jokin Murguialday (ESP)	Euskaltel–Euskadi	+ 2' 21"
7	David Domínguez (ESP)	Feira dos Sofás–Boavista	+ 3' 19"
8	Rafael Barbas (POR)	Tavfer–Ovos Matinados–Mortágua	+ 3' 26"
9	Louis Ferreira (FRA)	Anicolor / Campicarn	+ 3' 26"
10	Diogo Barbosa (POR)	Team Tavira / Crédito Agrícola	+ 3' 26"

General classification after Stage 7
Rank	Rider	Team	Time
1	Alexis Guérin (FRA)	Anicolor / Campicarn	23h 29' 45"
2	Artem Nych (RUS)	Anicolor / Campicarn	+ 47"
3	Adrià Pericas (ESP)	UAE Team Emirates XRG	+ 1' 57"
4	Pedro Silva (POR)	Feira dos Sofás–Boavista	+ 3' 21"
5	José Fernandes (POR)	GI Group Holding–Simoldes–UDO	+ 4' 29"
6	Tiago Antunes (POR)	Efapel Cycling	+ 4' 57"
7	Jokin Murguialday (ESP)	Euskaltel–Euskadi	+ 5' 18"
8	Emanuel Duarte (POR)	Credibom / LA Alumínios / Marcos Car	+ 5' 58"
9	Rui Carvalho (POR)	GI Group Holding–Simoldes–UDO	+ 7' 54"
10	Louis Ferreira (FRA)	Anicolor / Campicarn	+ 8' 03"

=== Stage 8 ===
14 August 2026 — Melgaço – Fafe, 166 km (103 mi)

The 8th stage was neutralized due to the death of British cyclist Finlay Tarling of the NSN Development team.

General classification after Stage 8
Rank	Rider	Team	Time
1	Alexis Guérin (FRA)	Anicolor / Campicarn	23h 29' 45"
2	Artem Nych (RUS)	Anicolor / Campicarn	+ 47"
3	Adrià Pericas (ESP)	UAE Team Emirates XRG	+ 1' 57"
4	Pedro Silva (POR)	Feira dos Sofás–Boavista	+ 3' 21"
5	José Fernandes (POR)	GI Group Holding–Simoldes–UDO	+ 4' 29"
6	Tiago Antunes (POR)	Efapel Cycling	+ 4' 57"
7	Jokin Murguialday (ESP)	Euskaltel–Euskadi	+ 5' 18"
8	Emanuel Duarte (POR)	Credibom / LA Alumínios / Marcos Car	+ 5' 58"
9	Rui Carvalho (POR)	GI Group Holding–Simoldes–UDO	+ 7' 54"
10	Louis Ferreira (FRA)	Anicolor / Campicarn	+ 8' 03"

=== Stage 9 ===
15 August 2026 — Paredes – Mondim de Basto, 142.6 km (88.6 mi)

Stage 9 Result
Rank	Rider	Team	Time
1	Alexis Guérin (FRA)	Anicolor / Campicarn	3h 44' 55"
2	José Fernandes (POR)	GI Group Holding–Simoldes–UDO	+ 3"
3	Artem Nych (RUS)	Anicolor / Campicarn	+ 9"
4	Tiago Antunes (POR)	Efapel Cycling	+ 46"
5	Emanuel Duarte (POR)	Credibom / LA Alumínios / Marcos Car	+ 46"
6	Pedro Silva (POR)	Feira dos Sofás–Boavista	+ 59"
7	Jokin Murguialday (ESP)	Euskaltel–Euskadi	+ 1' 08"
8	Jesus del Pino (ESP)	Aviludo–Louletano–Loulé	+ 1' 22"
9	Keegan Swirbul (USA)	Efapel Cycling	+ 1' 32"
10	Rui Carvalho (POR)	GI Group Holding–Simoldes–UDO	+ 2' 27"

General classification after Stage 9
Rank	Rider	Team	Time
1	Alexis Guérin (FRA)	Anicolor / Campicarn	23h 29' 45"
2	Artem Nych (RUS)	Anicolor / Campicarn	+ 1' 02"
3	Pedro Silva (POR)	Feira dos Sofás–Boavista	+ 4' 30"
4	José Fernandes (POR)	GI Group Holding–Simoldes–UDO	+ 4' 36"
5	Adrià Pericas (ESP)	UAE Team Emirates XRG	+ 5' 38"
6	Tiago Antunes (POR)	Efapel Cycling	+ 5' 53"
7	Jokin Murguialday (ESP)	Euskaltel–Euskadi	+ 6' 36"
8	Emanuel Duarte (POR)	Credibom / LA Alumínios / Marcos Car	+ 6' 54"
9	Rui Carvalho (POR)	GI Group Holding–Simoldes–UDO	+ 10' 31"
10	Diogo Barbosa (POR)	Team Tavira / Crédito Agrícola	+ 11' 55"

=== Stage 10 ===
16 August 2026 — Maia – Porto, 136.9 km (85.1 mi)

Stage 10 Result
Rank	Rider	Team	Time
1	Rui Oliveira (POR)	UAE Team Emirates XRG	3h 06' 35"
2	Daniel Cavia (ESP)	Burgos Burpellet BH	+ 0"
3	Francisco Campos (POR)	Team Tavira / Crédito Agrícola	+ 2"
4	Axel van der Tuuk (NED)	Euskaltel–Euskadi	+ 2"
5	Jordi López (ESP)	Euskaltel–Euskadi	+ 2"
6	Artem Nych (RUS)	Anicolor / Campicarn	+ 2"
7	Tiago Antunes (POR)	Efapel Cycling	+ 2"
8	Alexis Guérin (FRA)	Anicolor / Campicarn	+ 2"
9	David Domínguez (ESP)	Feira dos Sofás–Boavista	+ 2"
10	Tomas Contte (ARG)	Aviludo–Louletano–Loulé	+ 6"

Final General classification
Rank	Rider	Team	Time
1	Alexis Guérin (FRA)	Anicolor / Campicarn	30h 21' 07"
2	Artem Nych (RUS)	Anicolor / Campicarn	+ 1' 02"
3	Pedro Silva (POR)	Feira dos Sofás–Boavista	+ 4' 37"
4	José Fernandes (POR)	GI Group Holding–Simoldes–UDO	+ 4' 47"
5	Adrià Pericas (ESP)	UAE Team Emirates XRG	+ 5' 38"
6	Tiago Antunes (POR)	Efapel Cycling	+ 5' 53"
7	Jokin Murguialday (ESP)	Euskaltel–Euskadi	+ 6' 47"
8	Emanuel Duarte (POR)	Credibom / LA Alumínios / Marcos Car	+ 6' 54"
9	Rui Carvalho (POR)	GI Group Holding–Simoldes–UDO	+ 10' 42"
10	Diogo Barbosa (POR)	Team Tavira / Crédito Agrícola	+ 12' 06"

== Classifications ==
=== Final general classification ===
Final General classification
Rank	Rider	Team	Time
1	Alexis Guérin (FRA)	Anicolor / Campicarn	30h 21' 07"
2	Artem Nych (RUS)	Anicolor / Campicarn	+ 1' 02"
3	Pedro Silva (POR)	Feira dos Sofás–Boavista	+ 4' 37"
4	José Fernandes (POR)	GI Group Holding–Simoldes–UDO	+ 4' 47"
5	Adrià Pericas (ESP)	UAE Team Emirates XRG	+ 5' 38"
6	Tiago Antunes (POR)	Efapel Cycling	+ 5' 53"
7	Jokin Murguialday (ESP)	Euskaltel–Euskadi	+ 6' 47"
8	Emanuel Duarte (POR)	Credibom / LA Alumínios / Marcos Car	+ 6' 54"
9	Rui Carvalho (POR)	GI Group Holding–Simoldes–UDO	+ 10' 42"
10	Diogo Barbosa (POR)	Team Tavira / Crédito Agrícola	+ 12' 06"

=== Final secondary classifications ===
==== Points classification ====
Final Points classification
Rank	Rider	Team	Time
1	Rui Oliveira (POR)	UAE Team Emirates XRG	105
2	Daniel Cavia (ESP)	Burgos Burpellet BH	78
3	Artem Nych (RUS)	Anicolor / Campicarn	75
4	Francisco Campos (POR)	Team Tavira / Crédito Agrícola	74
5	Alexis Guérin (FRA)	Anicolor / Campicarn	72
6	Pedro Silva (POR)	Feira dos Sofás–Boavista	43
7	Tomas Contte (ARG)	Aviludo–Louletano–Loulé	43
8	Xabier Isasa (ESP)	Euskaltel–Euskadi	40
9	José Fernandes (POR)	GI Group Holding–Simoldes–UDO	40
10	Tiago Antunes (POR)	Efapel Cycling	34

==== Mountains classification ====
Final Mountains classification
Rank	Rider	Team	Time
1	Alexis Guérin (FRA)	Anicolor / Campicarn	72
2	Pedro Silva (POR)	Feira dos Sofás–Boavista	62
3	Artem Nych (RUS)	Anicolor / Campicarn	61
4	Oscar Rota (ESP)	Feira dos Sofás–Boavista	51
5	José Fernandes (POR)	GI Group Holding–Simoldes–UDO	37
6	Adrià Pericas (ESP)	UAE Team Emirates XRG	32
7	Jokin Murguialday (ESP)	Euskaltel–Euskadi	27
8	Tiago Antunes (POR)	Efapel Cycling	18
9	Fábio Costa (POR)	Feira dos Sofás–Boavista	17
10	Rúben Rodrigues (POR)	Feira dos Sofás–Boavista	15

==== Young rider classification ====
Final Young Rider classification
Rank	Rider	Team	Time
1	Adrià Pericas (ESP)	UAE Team Emirates XRG	30h 26' 45"
2	Rafael Barbas (POR)	Tavfer–Ovos Matinados–Mortágua	+ 15' 31"
3	André Ribeiro (POR)	GI Group Holding–Simoldes–UDO	+ 24' 17"
4	Jeremy Smith (AUS)	Óbidos Cycling Team	+ 1h 02' 35"
5	Guilherme Mestre (POR)	Team Tavira / Crédito Agrícola	+ 1h 14' 10"
6	Cláudio Leal (POR)	Aviludo–Louletano–Loulé	+ 1h 28' 18"
7	João Martins (POR)	Credibom / LA Alumínios / Marcos Car	+ 1h 37' 31"
8	Rúben Rodrigues (POR)	Feira dos Sofás–Boavista	+ 1h 38' 33"
9	Jaime Torres (ESP)	UAE Team Emirates XRG	+ 1h 46' 58"
10	Alvaro Navas (ESP)	Óbidos Cycling Team	+ 1h 54' 45"

==== Team classification ====
TBA

=== Classification progression ===
Progression of the classification leaders after each stage
Stage	Stage winner	General classification	Points classification	Mountains classification	Young rider classification	Team classification
Prologue	Julius Johansen	Julius Johansen	not awarded	not awarded	Luca Giaimi	Anicolor / Campicarn
Stage 1	Francisco Campos	Rui Oliveira	Francisco Campos	Oscar Rota	Adrià Pericas	Anicolor / Campicarn
Stage 2	Santiago Mesa	Rui Oliveira	Daniel Cavia	Oscar Rota	Adrià Pericas	Anicolor / Campicarn
Stage 3	Leangel Linarez	Rui Oliveira	Daniel Cavia	Oscar Rota	Adrià Pericas	Anicolor / Campicarn
Stage 4	Alexis Guérin	Alexis Guérin	Daniel Cavia	Oscar Rota	Adrià Pericas	Anicolor / Campicarn
Stage 5	Julius Johansen	Alexis Guérin	Daniel Cavia	Oscar Rota	Adrià Pericas	Anicolor / Campicarn
Stage 6	Xabier Isasa	Alexis Guérin	Rui Oliveira	Oscar Rota	Adrià Pericas	Anicolor / Campicarn
Stage 7	Adrià Pericas	Alexis Guérin	Rui Oliveira	Alexis Guérin	Adrià Pericas	Anicolor / Campicarn
Stage 8	not awarded	Alexis Guérin	Rui Oliveira	Alexis Guérin	Adrià Pericas	Anicolor / Campicarn
Stage 9	Alexis Guérin	Alexis Guérin	Rui Oliveira	Alexis Guérin	Adrià Pericas	Anicolor / Campicarn
Stage 10	Rui Oliveira	Alexis Guérin	Rui Oliveira	Alexis Guérin	Adrià Pericas	Anicolor / Campicarn
Final classifications		Alexis Guérin	Rui Oliveira	Alexis Guérin	Adrià Pericas	Anicolor / Campicarn

== Off-the-road aspects ==
=== Partners ===
- The official broadcaster is the Portuguese public television channel RTP.
- The title sponsor is the Portuguese brand Jogos Santa Casa.
- The official jersey sponsors are:
  - Galp Energia – Points classification jersey
  - Continente – Mountains classification jersey
  - Paredes - Rota dos Móveis – Young rider classification jersey

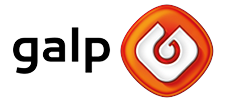
