= 2026 Tour of Oman =

Omani cycling race

2026 UCI ProSeries

Race details
- Dates: 7–11 February 2026
- Stages: 5
- Distance: 856.3 km (532.1 mi)
- Winning time: 19h 33' 16"

Results
| Jersey awarded to the overall winner | Winner | Christian Scaroni (ITA) | (XDS Astana Team) |
| | Second | Cristián Rodríguez (ESP) | (XDS Astana Team) |
| | Third | Adam Yates (GBR) | (UAE Team Emirates XRG) |
| Jersey awarded to the points classification winner | Points | Christian Scaroni (ITA) | (XDS Astana Team) |
| Jersey awarded to the young rider classification winner | Young rider | Diego Pescador (COL) | (Movistar Team) |
| Jersey awarded to the sprints classification winner | Sprints | Patryk Goszczurny (POL) | (Visma–Lease a Bike) |
| | Team | (Kazakhstan) XDS Astana Team | |

The 2026 Tour of Oman is a road cycling stage race that takes place between 7 and 11 February 2026 in Oman. The race is rated as a Category 2. Pro event on the 2026 UCI ProSeries calendar, and is the 15th edition of the Tour of Oman.

== Teams ==
Eleven UCI WorldTeams, six UCI ProTeams, and the Omani national team made up the 18 teams that participate in the race.

UCI WorldTeams

- Alpecin–Premier Tech
- EF Education–EasyPost
- Groupama–FDJ United
- Lotto–Intermarché
- Movistar Team
- Soudal–Quick-Step
- Team Jayco–AlUla
- UAE Team Emirates XRG
- Uno-X Mobility
- Visma–Lease a Bike
- XDS Astana Team

UCI ProTeams

- Burgos Burpellet BH
- Caja Rural–Seguros RGA
- Cofidis
- Pinarello–Q36.5 Pro Cycling Team
- Team TotalEnergies
- Tudor Pro Cycling Team

National Teams

- Oman

== Route ==
Stage characteristics and winners
| Stage | Date | Course | Distance | Type | Stage winner |
|---|---|---|---|---|---|
| 1 | 7 February | Ministry of Tourism to Bimmah Sink Hole | 170.9 km (106.2 mi) | Flat stage | Juan Sebastián Molano (COL) |
| 2 | 8 February | Al Rustaq Fort to Yitti Hills | 191.4 km (118.9 mi) | Hilly stage | Baptiste Veistroffer (FRA) |
| 3 | 9 February | Samail "Al Fayhaa Resthouse" to Misfat al Abriyeen (Eastern Mountain) | 191.3 km (118.9 mi) | Hilly stage | Mauro Schmid (SUI) |
| 4 | 10 February | Al Sawadi Beach to Sohar | 146.8 km (91.2 mi) | Flat stage | Erlend Blikra (NOR) |
| 5 | 11 February | Nizwa to Jabal al Akhdhar (Green Mountain) | 155.9 km (96.9 mi) | Mountain stage | Christian Scaroni (ITA) |
| Total | | | 856.3 km (532.1 mi) | | |

== Stages ==
=== Stage 1 ===
7 February 2026 — Ministry of Tourism to Bimmah Sink Hole, 170.9 km (106.2 mi)

Stage 1 Result
| Rank | Rider | Team | Time |
|---|---|---|---|
| 1 | Juan Sebastián Molano (COL) | UAE Team Emirates XRG | 4h 24' 54" |
| 2 | Fernando Gaviria (COL) | Caja Rural–Seguros RGA | + 0" |
| 3 | Gerben Thijssen (BEL) | Alpecin–Premier Tech | + 0" |
| 4 | Erlend Blikra (NOR) | Uno-X Mobility | + 0" |
| 5 | Amaury Capiot (BEL) | Team Jayco–AlUla | + 0" |
| 6 | Rick Pluimers (NED) | Tudor Pro Cycling Team | + 0" |
| 7 | Madis Mihkels (EST) | EF Education–EasyPost | + 0" |
| 8 | Iván García Cortina (ESP) | Movistar Team | + 0" |
| 9 | Bryan Coquard (FRA) | Cofidis | + 0" |
| 10 | Steffen De Schuyteneer (BEL) | Lotto–Intermarché | + 0" |

General classification after Stage 1
| Rank | Rider | Team | Time |
|---|---|---|---|
| 1 | Juan Sebastián Molano (COL) | UAE Team Emirates XRG | 4h 24' 44" |
| 2 | Fernando Gaviria (COL) | Caja Rural–Seguros RGA | + 4" |
| 3 | Patryk Goszczurny (POL) | Visma–Lease a Bike | + 4" |
| 4 | Gerben Thijssen (BEL) | Alpecin–Premier Tech | + 6" |
| 5 | Alex Díaz (ESP) | Caja Rural–Seguros RGA | + 7" |
| 6 | José Luis Faura (ESP) | Burgos Burpellet BH | + 7" |
| 7 | Erlend Blikra (NOR) | Uno-X Mobility | + 10" |
| 8 | Amaury Capiot (BEL) | Team Jayco–AlUla | + 10" |
| 9 | Rick Pluimers (NED) | Tudor Pro Cycling Team | + 10" |
| 10 | Madis Mihkels (EST) | EF Education–EasyPost | + 10" |

=== Stage 2 ===
8 February 2026 — Al Rustaq Fort to Yitti Hills, 191.4 km (118.9 mi)

Stage 2 Result
| Rank | Rider | Team | Time |
|---|---|---|---|
| 1 | Baptiste Veistroffer (FRA) | Lotto–Intermarché | 4h 22' 43" |
| 2 | Henok Mulubrhan (ERI) | XDS Astana Team | + 17" |
| 3 | Thibaud Gruel (FRA) | Groupama–FDJ United | + 17" |
| 4 | Bryan Coquard (FRA) | Cofidis | + 17" |
| 5 | Diego Ulissi (ITA) | XDS Astana Team | + 17" |
| 6 | Natnael Tesfatsion (ERI) | Movistar Team | + 17" |
| 7 | Emilien Jeannière (FRA) | Team TotalEnergies | + 17" |
| 8 | Bart Lemmen (NED) | Visma–Lease a Bike | + 17" |
| 9 | Lukas Nerurkar (GBR) | EF Education–EasyPost | + 17" |
| 10 | Roger Adrià (ESP) | Movistar Team | + 17" |

General classification after Stage 2
| Rank | Rider | Team | Time |
|---|---|---|---|
| 1 | Baptiste Veistroffer (FRA) | Lotto–Intermarché | 8h 47' 23" |
| 2 | Henok Mulubrhan (ERI) | XDS Astana Team | + 25" |
| 3 | Thibaud Gruel (FRA) | Groupama–FDJ United | + 27" |
| 4 | Bryan Coquard (FRA) | Cofidis | + 31" |
| 5 | Rick Pluimers (NED) | Tudor Pro Cycling Team | + 31" |
| 6 | Stefano Oldani (ITA) | Caja Rural–Seguros RGA | + 31" |
| 7 | Iván García Cortina (ESP) | Movistar Team | + 31" |
| 8 | Emilien Jeannière (FRA) | Team TotalEnergies | + 31" |
| 9 | Mikkel Frølich Honoré (DEN) | EF Education–EasyPost | + 31" |
| 10 | Marcel Camprubí (ESP) | Pinarello–Q36.5 Pro Cycling Team | + 31" |

=== Stage 3 ===
9 February 2026 — Samail "Al Fayhaa Resthouse" to Misfat al Abriyeen (Eastern Mountain), 191.3 km (118.9 mi)

Stage 3 Result
| Rank | Rider | Team | Time |
|---|---|---|---|
| 1 | Mauro Schmid (SUI) | Team Jayco–AlUla | 4h 13' 17" |
| 2 | Christian Scaroni (ITA) | XDS Astana Team | + 1" |
| 3 | Martin Tjøtta (NOR) | Uno-X Mobility | + 1" |
| 4 | Sebastian Berwick (AUS) | Caja Rural–Seguros RGA | + 3" |
| 5 | Thomas Bonnet (FRA) | Team TotalEnergies | + 7" |
| 6 | Diego Pescador (COL) | Movistar Team | + 7" |
| 7 | Cristián Rodríguez (ESP) | XDS Astana Team | + 11" |
| 8 | Chris Harper (AUS) | Pinarello–Q36.5 Pro Cycling Team | + 11" |
| 9 | Paul Double (GBR) | Team Jayco–AlUla | + 15" |
| 10 | Diego Ulissi (ITA) | XDS Astana Team | + 18" |

General classification after Stage 3
| Rank | Rider | Team | Time |
|---|---|---|---|
| 1 | Mauro Schmid (SUI) | Team Jayco–AlUla | 13h 01' 01" |
| 2 | Christian Scaroni (ITA) | XDS Astana Team | + 4" |
| 3 | Martin Tjøtta (NOR) | Uno-X Mobility | + 9" |
| 4 | Sebastian Berwick (AUS) | Caja Rural–Seguros RGA | + 13" |
| 5 | Diego Pescador (COL) | Movistar Team | + 17" |
| 6 | Chris Harper (AUS) | Pinarello–Q36.5 Pro Cycling Team | + 21" |
| 7 | Cristián Rodríguez (ESP) | XDS Astana Team | + 21" |
| 8 | Paul Double (GBR) | Team Jayco–AlUla | + 25" |
| 9 | Diego Ulissi (ITA) | XDS Astana Team | + 28" |
| 10 | Nairo Quintana (COL) | Movistar Team | + 30" |

=== Stage 4 ===
10 February 2026 — Al Sawadi Beach to Sohar, 146.8 km (91.2 mi)

Stage 4 Result
| Rank | Rider | Team | Time |
|---|---|---|---|
| 1 | Erlend Blikra (NOR) | Uno-X Mobility | 3h 09' 02" |
| 2 | Emmanuel Houcou (FRA) | Pinarello–Q36.5 Pro Cycling Team | + 0" |
| 3 | Juan Sebastián Molano (COL) | UAE Team Emirates XRG | + 0" |
| 4 | Stanisław Aniołkowski (POL) | Cofidis | + 0" |
| 5 | Stefano Oldani (ITA) | Caja Rural–Seguros RGA | + 0" |
| 6 | Rick Pluimers (NED) | Tudor Pro Cycling Team | + 0" |
| 7 | Fernando Gaviria (COL) | Caja Rural–Seguros RGA | + 0" |
| 8 | Amaury Capiot (BEL) | Team Jayco–AlUla | + 0" |
| 9 | Iván García Cortina (ESP) | Movistar Team | + 0" |
| 10 | Emilien Jeannière (FRA) | Team TotalEnergies | + 0" |

General classification after Stage 4
| Rank | Rider | Team | Time |
|---|---|---|---|
| 1 | Mauro Schmid (SUI) | Team Jayco–AlUla | 16h 10' 03" |
| 2 | Christian Scaroni (ITA) | XDS Astana Team | + 4" |
| 3 | Martin Tjøtta (NOR) | Uno-X Mobility | + 9" |
| 4 | Sebastian Berwick (AUS) | Caja Rural–Seguros RGA | + 13" |
| 5 | Diego Pescador (COL) | Movistar Team | + 17" |
| 6 | Chris Harper (AUS) | Pinarello–Q36.5 Pro Cycling Team | + 21" |
| 7 | Cristián Rodríguez (ESP) | XDS Astana Team | + 21" |
| 8 | Paul Double (GBR) | Team Jayco–AlUla | + 25" |
| 9 | Diego Ulissi (ITA) | XDS Astana Team | + 28" |
| 10 | Nairo Quintana (COL) | Movistar Team | + 30" |

=== Stage 5 ===
11 February 2026 — Nizwa to Jabal al Akhdhar (Green Mountain), 155.9 km (96.9 mi)

Stage 5 Result
| Rank | Rider | Team | Time |
|---|---|---|---|
| 1 | Christian Scaroni (ITA) | XDS Astana Team | 3h 23' 19" |
| 2 | Cristián Rodríguez (ESP) | XDS Astana Team | + 3" |
| 3 | Luke Plapp (AUS) | Team Jayco–AlUla | + 6" |
| 4 | Adam Yates (GBR) | UAE Team Emirates XRG | + 6" |
| 5 | Paul Double (GBR) | Team Jayco–AlUla | + 13" |
| 6 | Nairo Quintana (COL) | Movistar Team | + 16" |
| 7 | Sebastian Berwick (AUS) | Caja Rural–Seguros RGA | + 26" |
| 8 | Louis Rouland (FRA) | Cofidis | + 29" |
| 9 | Junior Lecerf (BEL) | Soudal–Quick-Step | + 30" |
| 10 | Diego Pescador (COL) | Movistar Team | + 30" |

General classification after Stage 5
| Rank | Rider | Team | Time |
|---|---|---|---|
| 1 | Christian Scaroni (ITA) | XDS Astana Team | 19h 33' 16" |
| 2 | Cristián Rodríguez (ESP) | XDS Astana Team | + 24" |
| 3 | Adam Yates (GBR) | UAE Team Emirates XRG | + 44" |
| 4 | Mauro Schmid (SUI) | Team Jayco–AlUla | + 44" |
| 5 | Paul Double (GBR) | Team Jayco–AlUla | + 44" |
| 6 | Sebastian Berwick (AUS) | Caja Rural–Seguros RGA | + 45" |
| 7 | Nairo Quintana (COL) | Movistar Team | + 52" |
| 8 | Diego Pescador (COL) | Movistar Team | + 53" |
| 9 | Martin Tjøtta (NOR) | Uno-X Mobility | + 1' 06" |
| 10 | Louis Rouland (FRA) | Cofidis | + 1' 07" |

== Classification leadership table ==
Classification leadership by stage
| Stage | Winner | General classification | Points classification | Young rider classification | Active rider classification | Team classification |
|---|---|---|---|---|---|---|
| 1 | Juan Sebastián Molano | Juan Sebastián Molano | Juan Sebastián Molano | Patryk Goszczurny | Patryk Goszczurny | Caja Rural–Seguros RGA |
| 2 | Baptiste Veistroffer | Baptiste Veistroffer | Baptiste Veistroffer | Thibaud Gruel | Patryk Goszczurny | Lotto–Intermarché |
| 3 | Mauro Schmid | Mauro Schmid | Baptiste Veistroffer | Martin Tjøtta | Patryk Goszczurny | XDS Astana Team |
| 4 | Erlend Blikra | Mauro Schmid | Baptiste Veistroffer | Martin Tjøtta | Patryk Goszczurny | XDS Astana Team |
| 5 | Christian Scaroni | Christian Scaroni | Christian Scaroni | Diego Pescador | Patryk Goszczurny | XDS Astana Team |
| Final | | Christian Scaroni | Christian Scaroni | Diego Pescador | Patryk Goszczurny | XDS Astana Team |

== Classification standings ==
Legend
| Denotes the leader of the general classification | Denotes the leader of the young rider classification |
| Denotes the leader of the points classification | Denotes the leader of the active rider classification |

=== General classification ===
Final general classification (1–10)
| Rank | Rider | Team | Time |
|---|---|---|---|
| 1 | Christian Scaroni (ITA) | XDS Astana Team | 19h 33' 16" |
| 2 | Cristián Rodríguez (ESP) | XDS Astana Team | + 24" |
| 3 | Adam Yates (GBR) | UAE Team Emirates XRG | + 44" |
| 4 | Mauro Schmid (SUI) | Team Jayco–AlUla | + 44" |
| 5 | Paul Double (GBR) | Team Jayco–AlUla | + 45" |
| 6 | Sebastian Berwick (AUS) | Caja Rural–Seguros RGA | + 45" |
| 7 | Nairo Quintana (COL) | Movistar Team | + 52" |
| 8 | Diego Pescador (COL) | Movistar Team | + 53" |
| 9 | Martin Tjøtta (NOR) | Uno-X Mobility | + 1' 06" |
| 10 | Louis Rouland (FRA) | Cofidis | + 1' 07" |

=== Points classification ===
Final points classification (1–10)
| Rank | Rider | Team | Points |
|---|---|---|---|
| 1 | Christian Scaroni (ITA) | XDS Astana Team | 27 |
| 2 | Baptiste Veistroffer (FRA) | Lotto–Intermarché | 26 |
| 3 | Juan Sebastián Molano (COL) | UAE Team Emirates XRG | 24 |
| 4 | Erlend Blikra (NOR) | Uno-X Mobility | 22 |
| 5 | Patryk Goszczurny (POL) | Visma–Lease a Bike | 18 |
| 6 | Cristián Rodríguez (ESP) | XDS Astana Team | 16 |
| 7 | Fernando Gaviria (COL) | Caja Rural–Seguros RGA | 16 |
| 8 | Mauro Schmid (SUI) | Team Jayco–AlUla | 15 |
| 9 | Henok Mulubrhan (ERI) | XDS Astana Team | 12 |
| 10 | Emmanuel Houcou (FRA) | Pinarello–Q36.5 Pro Cycling Team | 12 |

=== Young rider classification ===
Final young rider classification (1–10)
| Rank | Rider | Team | Time |
|---|---|---|---|
| 1 | Diego Pescador (COL) | Movistar Team | 19h 34' 09" |
| 2 | Martin Tjøtta (NOR) | Uno-X Mobility | + 13" |
| 3 | Louis Rouland (FRA) | Cofidis | + 14" |
| 4 | Niels Driesen (BEL) | Lotto–Intermarché | + 1' 06" |
| 5 | Lukas Nerurkar (GBR) | EF Education–EasyPost | + 1' 30" |
| 6 | Jan Castellon (ESP) | Caja Rural–Seguros RGA | + 1' 38" |
| 7 | Simone Gualdi (ITA) | Lotto–Intermarché | + 2' 12" |
| 8 | Pablo Torres (ESP) | UAE Team Emirates XRG | + 2' 29" |
| 9 | Sam Maisonobe (FRA) | Cofidis | + 4' 41" |
| 10 | Alex Baudin (FRA) | EF Education–EasyPost | + 5' 26" |

=== Active rider classification ===
Final active rider classification (1–10)
| Rank | Rider | Team | Points |
|---|---|---|---|
| 1 | Patryk Goszczurny (POL) | Visma–Lease a Bike | 30 |
| 2 | Baptiste Veistroffer (FRA) | Lotto–Intermarché | 20 |
| 3 | Jonas Iversby Hvideberg (NOR) | Uno-X Mobility | 6 |
| 4 | Christian Scaroni (ITA) | XDS Astana Team | 5 |
| 5 | José Luis Faura (ESP) | Burgos Burpellet BH | 5 |
| 6 | Warre Vangheluwe (BEL) | Soudal–Quick-Step | 4 |
| 7 | Alex Díaz (ESP) | Caja Rural–Seguros RGA | 4 |
| 8 | Cristián Rodríguez (ESP) | XDS Astana Team | 4 |
| 9 | Tim Marsman (NED) | Alpecin–Premier Tech | 4 |
| 10 | Mauro Schmid (SUI) | Team Jayco–AlUla | 3 |

=== Team classification ===
Final team classification (1–10)
| Rank | Team | Time |
|---|---|---|
| 1 | (Kazakhstan) XDS Astana Team | 58h 41' 46" |
| 2 | (Australia) Team Jayco–AlUla | + 2' 46" |
| 3 | (Spain) Movistar Team | + 3' 22" |
| 4 | (Spain) Burgos Burpellet BH | + 4' 28" |
| 5 | (France) Team TotalEnergies | + 4' 34" |
| 6 | (United States) EF Education–EasyPost | + 7' 24" |
| 7 | (Spain) Caja Rural–Seguros RGA | + 8' 55" |
| 8 | (Switzerland) Tudor Pro Cycling Team | + 9' 36" |
| 9 | (Belgium) Lotto–Intermarché | + 9' 49" |
| 10 | (United Arab Emirates) UAE Team Emirates XRG | + 12' 29" |
