= Diego Pescador =

Colombian cyclist

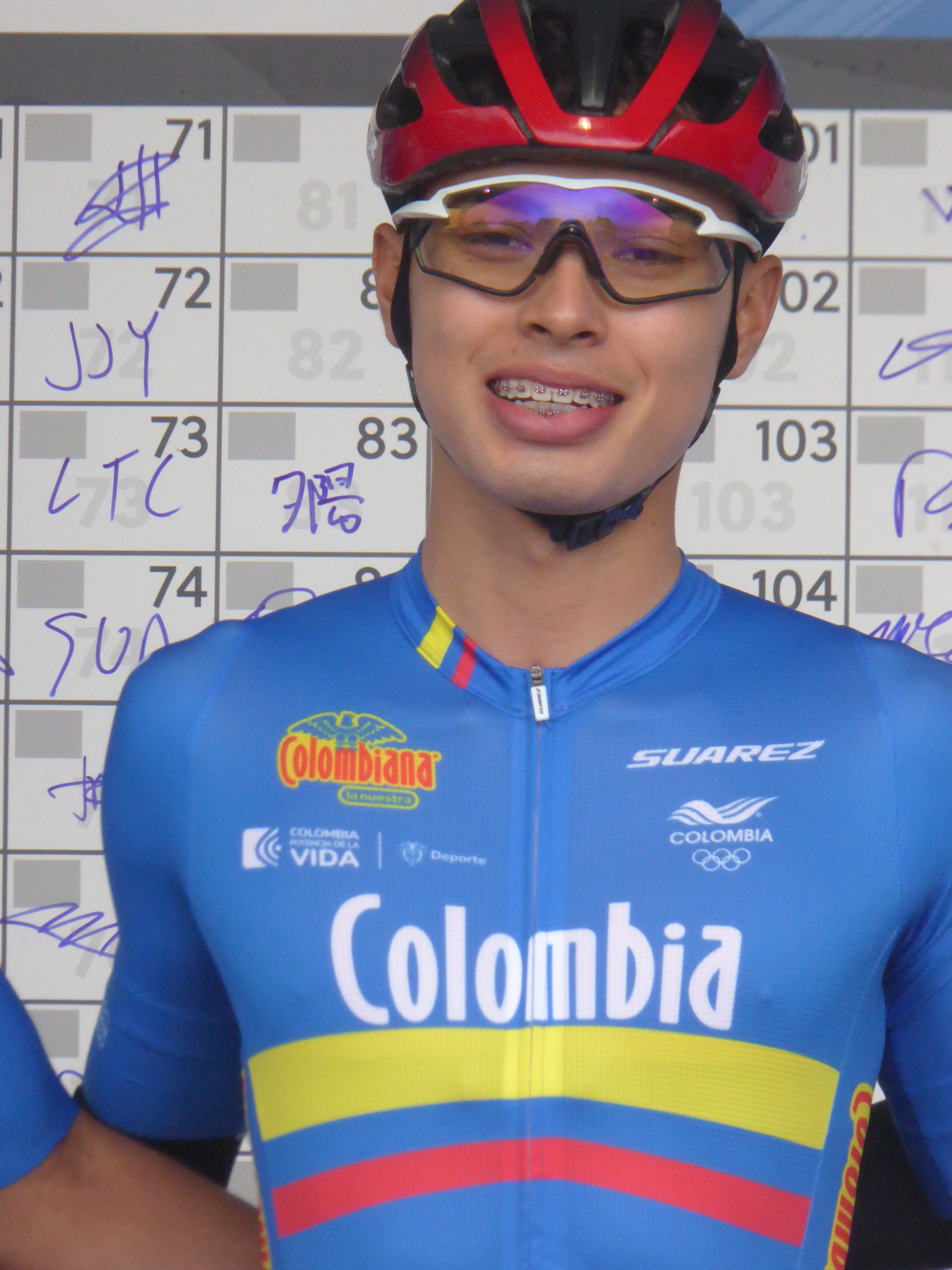
- Pescador in 2023

Personal information
- Full name: Diego Fernando Pescador Castro
- Nickname: The Fisherman
- Born: 21 December 2004 (age 21) Quimbaya, Quindío, Colombia
- Height: 1.74 m (5 ft 9 in)
- Weight: 60 kg (132 lb)

Cycling career
- Sport: Cycling
- Current team: Movistar Team
- Discipline: Road
- Role: Rider
- Rider type: Climber

Amateur teams
- 2021: Risaralda Casta de Campeones
- 2022: Bicicletas-Colombia

Professional teams
- 2023–2024: GW Shimano–Sidermec
- 2025–: Movistar Team

Diego Fernando Pescador Castro (born 21 December 2004) is a Colombian professional road racing cyclist, who currently rides for UCI WorldTeam Movistar Team.

== Major results ==
2023
1st Overall Vuelta a Antioquia

1st Young rider classification

1st Young rider classification, Vuelta a Colombia
5th Overall Clásico RCN

1st Stage 8

2024
2nd Overall Vuelta de la Juventud de Colombia

1st Stage 3

2nd G.P. Palio del Recioto
3rd Trofeo Piva
4th Overall Clásico RCN

1st Young rider classification

7th Overall Tour de l'Avenir
2025
6th Overall Vuelta a Asturias
2026
8th Overall Tour of Oman

1st Young rider classification

9th Trofeo Andratx–Pollença
