= Misfat al Abriyeen =

Village in Oman

Misfat al Abriyeen مسفاة العبريين
- Village
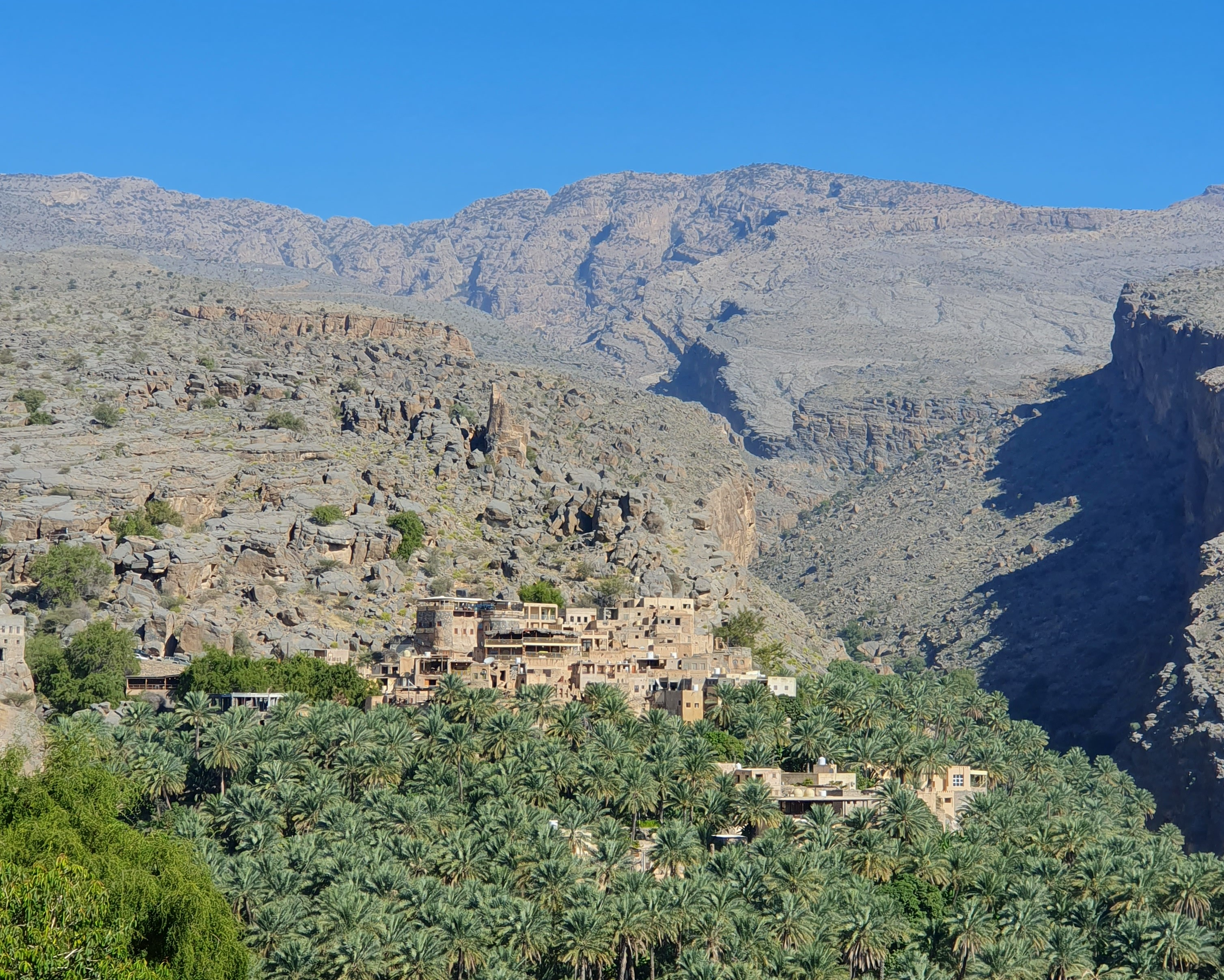

- Location in Oman
- Coordinates: 23°8′15″N 57°18′31″E
- Country: Oman
- Governorate: Ad Dakhiliyah
- Wilayah: Al Hamra

Population (2020)
  - Total: 962
- Time zone: UTC+4 (GST)

Misfat al Abriyeen or Misfah al Abriyyin (Arabic: مسفاة العبريين, romanized: msfā ālʿbryyn) is a village in the wilayah of Al Hamra in Oman.

Located in an oasis at 900 metres (3,000 ft) above sea level in the Western Hajar mountains, it has an extensive falaj water canalization system which dates back more than 2,000 years. It is still in use nowadays to supply the village with water from a local spring, and to irrigate the terraced fields where crops such as mangoes, pomegranates, figs, and olives are grown.

The settlement is perched on a rock, which acts as a natural fortification, and is characterized by narrow stone-paved roads and houses built with mud, stone and sarooj. Several of the buildings that are still standing date back more than 200 years. Its architectural style has been described as similar to that of the Yemeni highlands.

The village has undergone significant restoration work in the past years, with the creation of new hotels and heritage houses, and has been placed in the Best Tourism Villages list by the World Tourism Organization in 2021.

The valley of Wadi Al-Saq can be reached from the village, and is a tourist destination for hiking and trekking. From Misfat departs the trekking route W9 along an ancient donkey path, leading to the junction with W8 to Bilad Sayt and W10 to Sharaf Al Alamayn.

== Population ==
Population census
Year	Pop.	±%
2003	592	—
2010	696	+17.6%
2020	962	+38.2%

As of 2020, the village counted 962 inhabitants. Of these, 901 were Omani nationals and 61 foreign residents (6.3%). 39.2% of the inhabitants (377) were 14 years old or younger, while only 44 residents (4.6%) were 65 or older. Most of the inhabitants are of Bedouin descent.
