= Ayguatébia-Talau =

Ayguatébia-Talau Aiguatèbia i Talau (Catalan)
- Commune
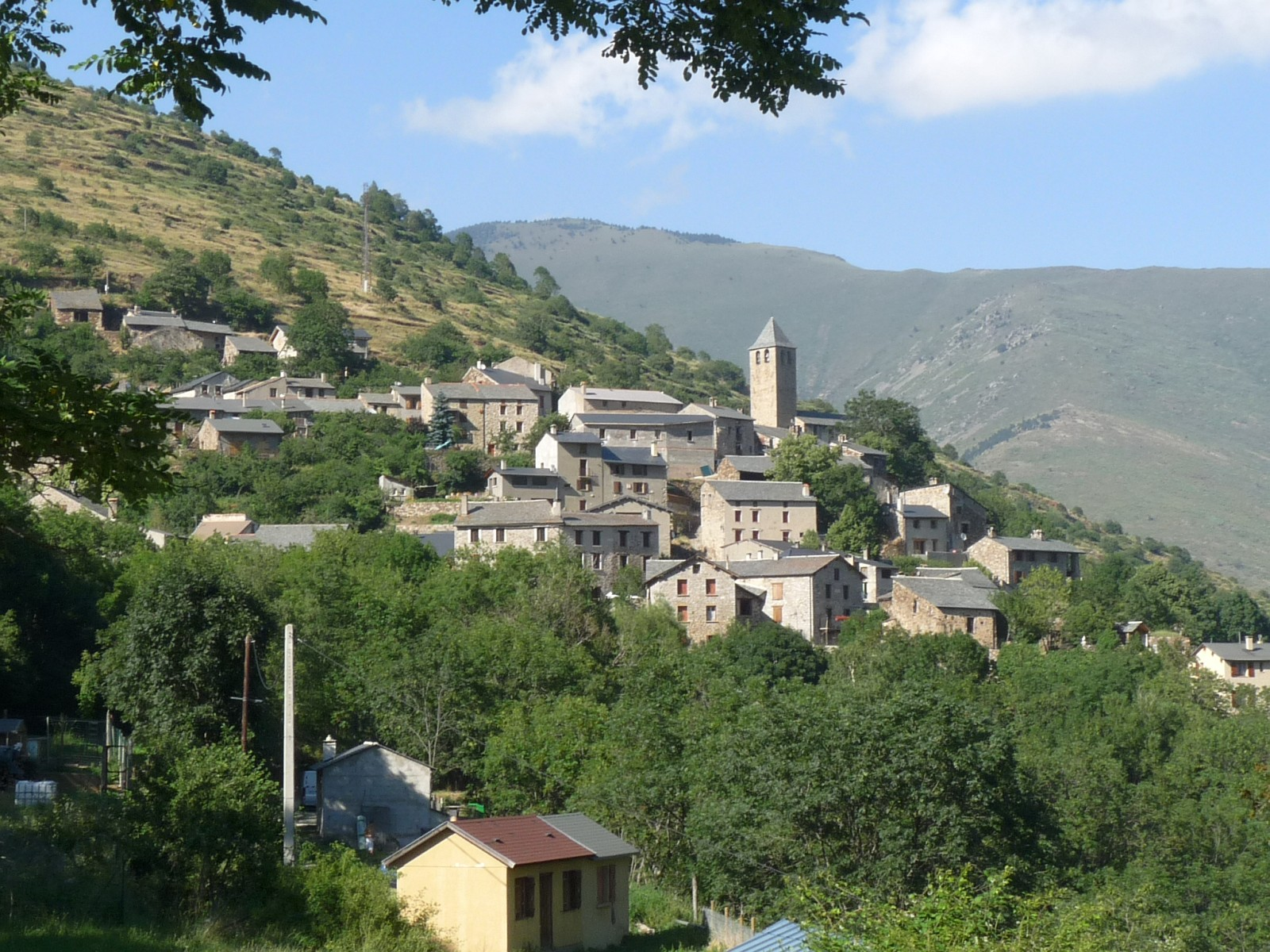
- A general view of Ayguatébia-Talau

- Coat of arms
- Location of Ayguatébia-Talau
- Location within France Location within Occitanie
- Coordinates: 42°34′26″N 2°11′07″E
- Country: France
- Region: Occitania
- Department: Pyrénées-Orientales
- Arrondissement: Prades
- Canton: Les Pyrénées catalanes
- Intercommunality: CC Pyrénées Catalanes

Government
  - Mayor (2020–2026): Georges Vicens
- Area^{1}: 29.68 km^{2} (11.46 sq mi)
- Elevation: 1,365 m (4,478 ft)
- Highest elevation: 2,030 m (6,660 ft)
- Lowest elevation: 720 m (2,360 ft)
- Population (2023): 49
  - Density: 1.7/km^{2} (4.3/sq mi)
- Time zone: UTC+01:00 (CET)
  - Summer (DST): UTC+02:00 (CEST)
- INSEE/Postal code: 66010 /66360
- ^{1} French Land Register data, which excludes lakes, ponds, glaciers > 1 km^{2} (0.386 sq mi or 247 acres) and river estuaries.

Ayguatébia-Talau (French pronunciation: [aiɡwatebja talo]; Catalan: Aiguatèbia i Talau) is a commune in the Pyrénées-Orientales department in southern France.

== Geography ==
=== Location ===
Ayguatébia-Talau is located in the canton of Les Pyrénées catalanes and in the arrondissement of Prades.

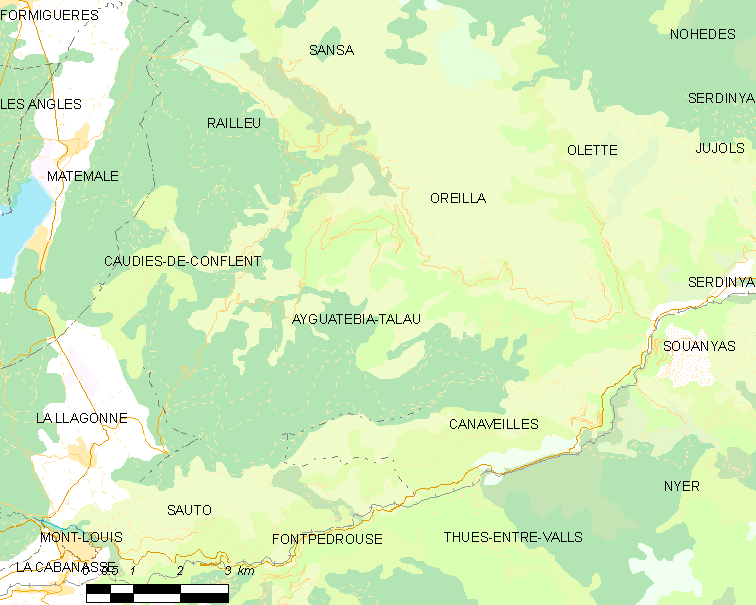
Map of Ayguatébia-Talau and its surrounding communes

== Toponymy ==
Attested forms

The name of Ayguatébia appears in 958 as Aqua tebeda, immediately followed in 959 by Aquatepida. Villa Aque tepida is used during the 11th century and Aiguetevia is found in 1392. From the 17th century and on, the common forms are Aiguetebia and Ayguatebia. The modern spelling in Catalan is Aiguatèbia, but the traditional spelling, Ayguatèbia, should be preferred.

The name of Talau appears in 874 as Villa Talatio and in 876 as Talacho. Talazo, Talaz and Talaxo are used during the 10th century. Talau appears in the 13th century and is used since.

Etymology

The name of Ayguatébia comes from the Latin aqua tepida, meaning lukewarm water, in relation with warm springs found in Ayguatébia.

The name of Talau comes from a pre-Latin radical, Tal or Tala, meaning a small plateau found above a cliff or a hill, which corresponds to the situation of the village of Talau, located above the valley of the Cabrils river.

== History ==
The commune Ayguatébia-Talau was created on January 1, 1983, by uniting the former communes of Ayguatébia and Talau.

== Government and politics ==
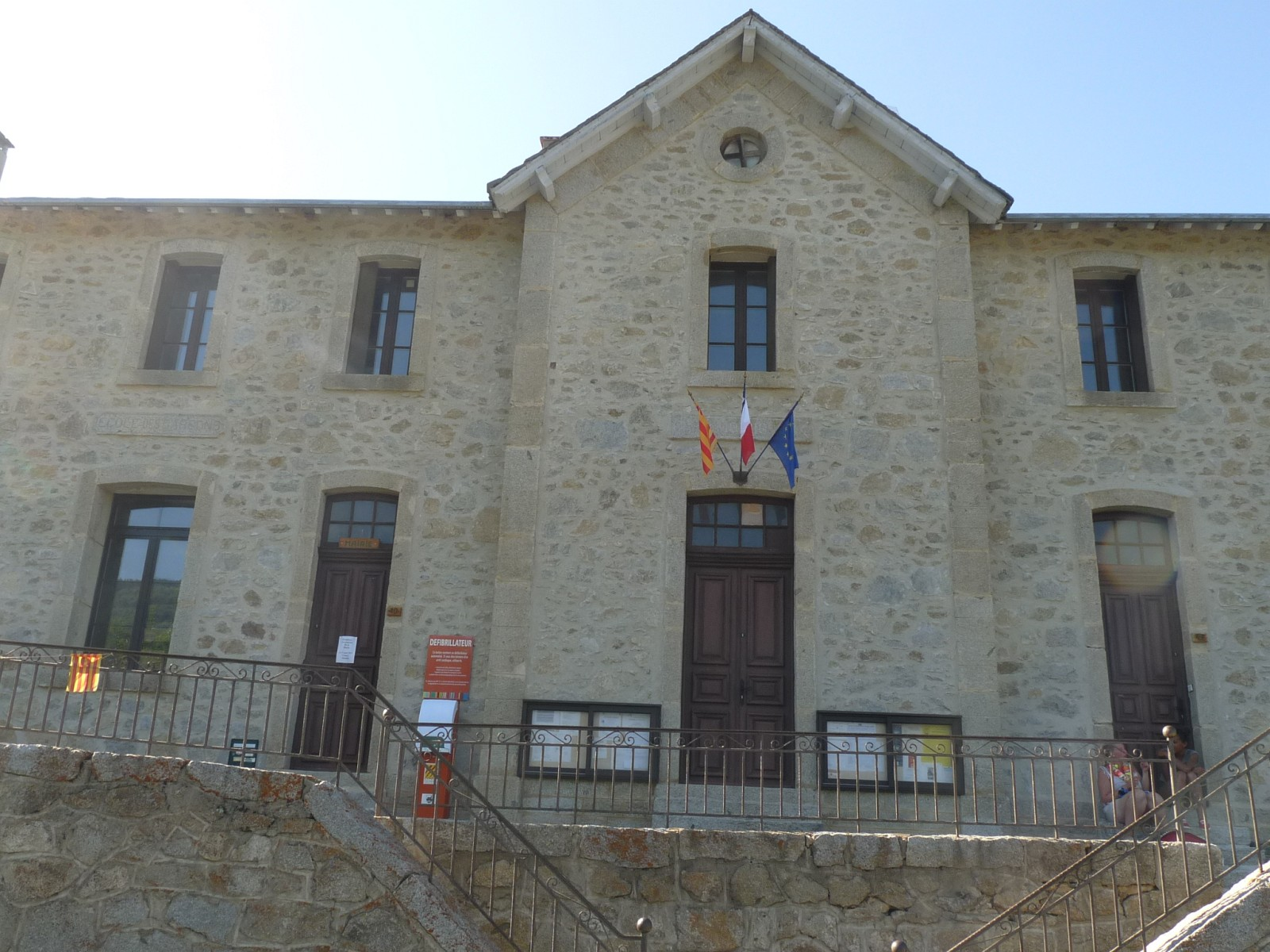
The town hall in Ayguatebia

=== Mayors ===
Mayor	Term start	Term end
Lucien Mitjaville	1983	2011
Marc Rousset	2011	2012
Lucien Mitjaville	2012	2014
Georges Vicens	2014	

== Population ==
Historical population
Year	Pop.	±% p.a.
1954	95	—
1962	42	−9.70%
1968	32	−4.43%
1975	23	−4.61%
1982	21	−1.29%
1990	45	+10.00%
1999	46	+0.24%
2007	45	−0.27%
2012	44	−0.45%
2017	38	−2.89%
2023	49	+4.33%
Source: INSEE

== Architecture ==
- Saint-Felix and Saint-Armengol church in Ayguatébia
- Saint-Stephen church in Talau
- Saint-Michael of the Plans church

== Notable people ==
- Saint Ermengol (?–1035) was possibly born in Ayguatébia.

== See also ==
- Communes of the Pyrénées-Orientales department
