= Saint Ermengol =

Spanish bishop (died 1035)

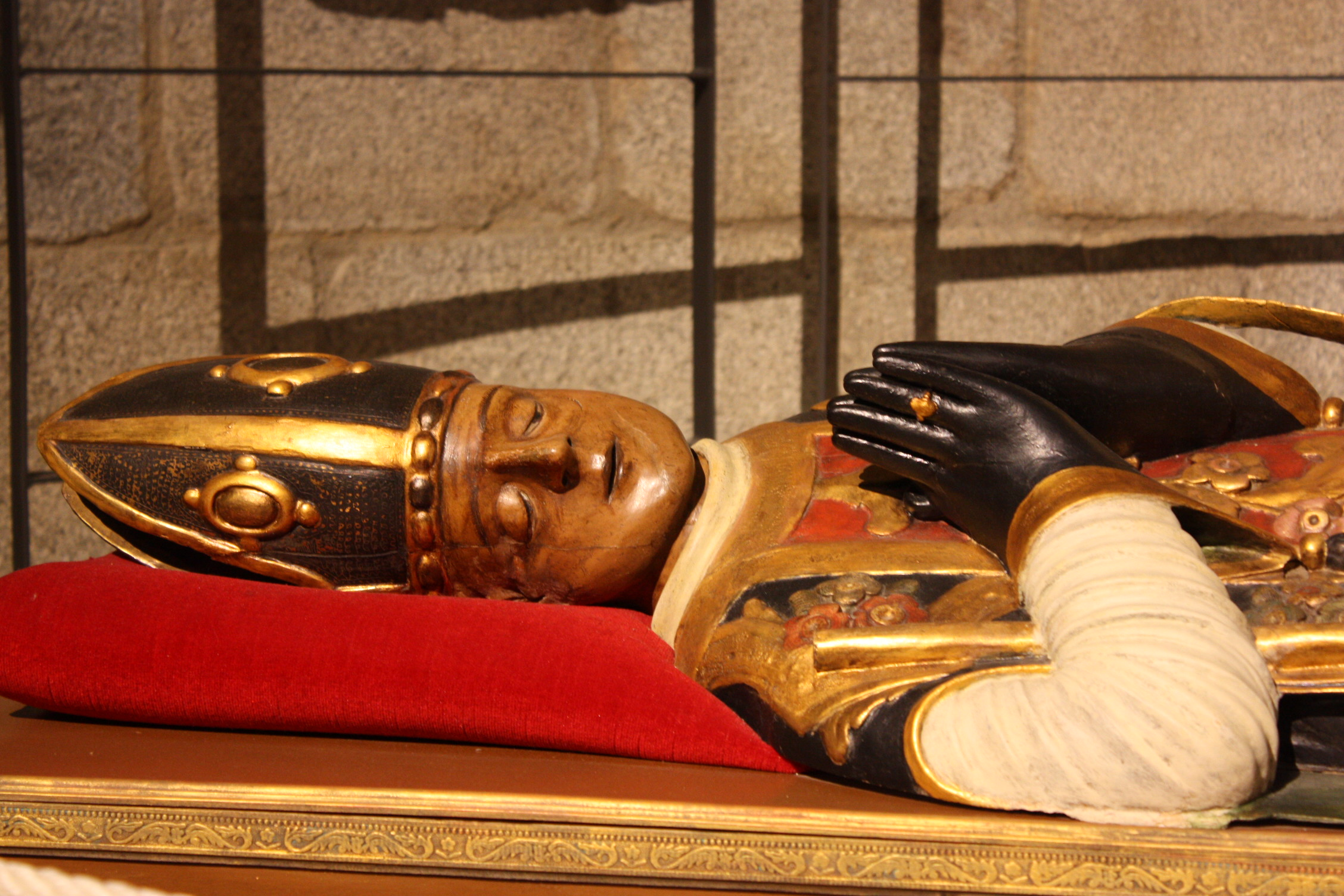

Bishop of Urgell
- Born: Unknown; Ayguatébia, Conflent (?)
- Died: 1035; El Pont de Bar
- Venerated in: Roman Catholicism; Eastern Orthodox Church
- Feast: November 3

Saint Ermengol (also Armengol or Armengod) or Hermengaudius was the bishop of Urgell from 1010 until his death in 1035.

Possibly born in the village of Ayguatébia, he was the son of Bernat I, viscount of Conflent, and his wife Guisla de Lluçià, and also nephew and successor to bishop Sal·la, as well as member of the ruling dynasty of the county of Conflent.

By 1002 Ermengol reached the post of archdeacon, and the following year, the bishop of Urgell, Sal·la, had the arrangements made for Ermengol to succeed him. Ermengol began his episcopate by reforming the cathedral canons along the lines of the life of Saint Augustine, as well as granting them lands in the shires of Vallespir, Cerdanya, and Alt Urgell. In 1012 he travelled to Rome for an audience with pope Benedict VIII, who confirmed the possessions of his bishopric as well as its jurisdiction, including the one over the county of Ribagorza. In 1017, Ermengol was involved in the establishment of the bishopric of Roda de Isábena, consecrated a certain Borrell as bishop, and received recognition from the latter of his superiority in the ecclesiastical hierarchy. Ermengol is also credited with having led the Christian military expedition that wrested the Guissona plain from the Islamic Taifa of Zaragoza around 1020.

He conflicted often with the nobility of the county of Urgell and collaborated in the undertaking of many public works. He also built the cathedral of Urgell, which was consecrated in 1040 by his successor, bishop Eribau. Because of all these works, Ermengol is celebrated each year at the Saint Ermengol Fair, in Seu d'Urgell town. He died in 1035 while assisting in the building of a bridge near El Pont de Bar village. The following year after his death, the veneration of Ermengol began, and a few years later he was canonised. His holiday is celebrated in November 3.

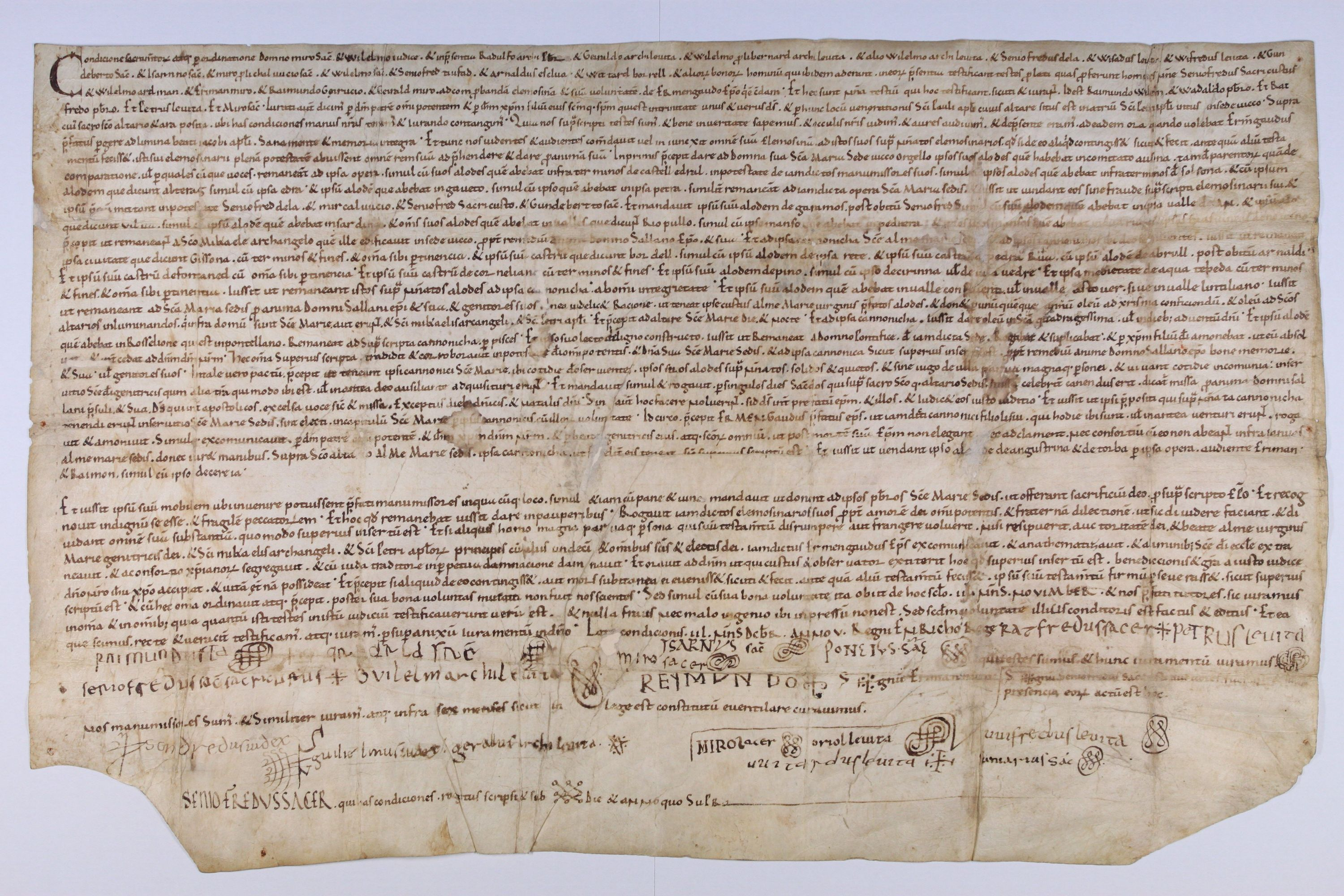
Saint Ermengol's sacramental last will and testament, Arxiu Comarcal de l'Alt Urgell.
