= Tour of Huangshan =

Chinese multi-day road cycling race

Race details
- Date: July
- Region: Anhui, China
- Local name: 黄山 (in Chinese)
- Discipline: Road
- Competition: UCI Asia Tour 2.2
- Type: Stage race

History
- First edition: 2023
- Editions: 3 (as of 2025)
- First winner: Julien Trarieux (FRA)
- Most recent: Daniel Cavia (ESP)

The Tour of Huangshan is an annual professional road bicycle racing stage race held in Anhui Province, China. The race consists of three stages and is part of the UCI Asia Tour. The event was first held in 2023 as a 2.2 UCI race and was created in order to promote cycling in Huangshan City.

== Winners ==
Year	Country	Rider	Team
2023	France	Julien Trarieux	China Glory Continental Cycling Team
2024	Russia	Roman Maikin	Chengdu Cycling Team
2025	Spain	Daniel Cavia	Burgos Burpellet BH
2026	New Zealand	Luke Mudgway	Li-Ning Star
