= Queralt =

Queralt is a Catalan female given name. Notable people with the name include:

- Queralt Casas (born 1992), Spanish basketball player
- Queralt Castellet (born 1989), Spanish snowboarder
- Queralt Lahoz (born 1991), Spanish singer
- Queralt Vidal (born 2000), Catalan social media personality
