= Queralt Vidal =

Catalan lawyer (born 2000)

Queralt Vidal Sala (born January 26, 2000 in Manresa) is a Catalan lawyer and social media personality.

== Social media ==
During her law and international relations studies, Vidal studied in New York, where she began making videos on social media about how the city was different to expectations, initially only visible to her friends. They encouraged her to make public videos, and she decided to keep making them in the Catalan language as her native tongue. She has also discussed feeling disconnected from her language while living abroad, with videos another reason to speak it, and a desire to maintain and share it around the world. She credits her early videos going viral with it being made in New York and the "highly territorial" nature of TikTok. When people asked about the language, she began making videos about it for edutainment, and similarly branched out to videos about law in Spain.

Her videos on TikTok and Instagram became more popular when she began studying a master's degree in conflict resolution in Geneva, Switzerland. The content of her videos focused on her life in Switzerland, including everyday situations as well as the democracy and corruption she was studying. Her videos focusing on cultural differences became popular, exposing the language to more non-speakers, including both people who insult her and those who have become interested in learning it as a result.
