= Bilad Sayt =

Village in Oman

Bilad Sayt بلاد سيت
- Village
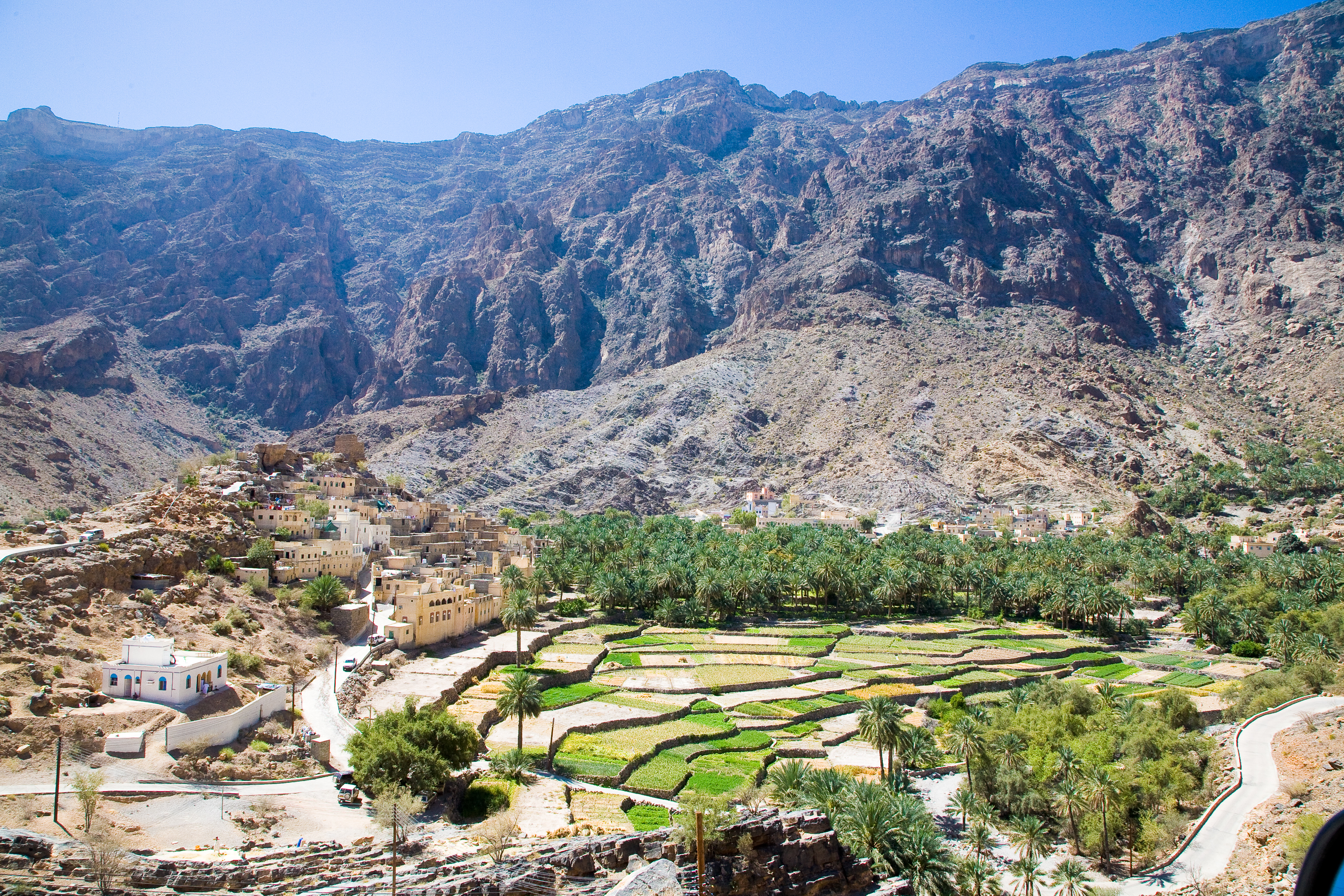
- The village of Bilad Sayt

- Location of Bilad Sayt in Oman
- Coordinates: 23°11′24.9″N 57°23′16.5″E
- Country: Oman
- Governorate: Ad Dakhiliyah
- Wilayah: Bahla

Population (2020)
  - Total: 3,567
- Time zone: UTC+4 (GST)

Bilad Sayt (Arabic: بلاد سيت, romanized: blād syt) is a mountain village in the wilayah of Bahla in Oman.

The village is located on the NE slope of the Al Hajar Mountains near the highest peak in the Sultanate of Oman, Jebel Shams. Bilad Sayt can be reached through Wadi Al Sahtan and Wadi Bani Awf from NE or via Al Hamra from the SW and is only accessible by 4-wheel-drive vehicles. Its clustered mud-and-stone houses and terraced fields make it a tourist attraction.

== Population ==
Population census
Year	Pop.	±%
2003	2,404	—
2010	2,484	+3.3%
2020	3,567	+43.6%

As of 2020, the village counted 3 567 inhabitants. Of these, 3 255 were Omani nationals and 312 foreign residents (8.7%).

== Bibliography ==
- Diana Darke; Shields, S. (2006). Oman. Bradt Travel Guides. p. 140. ISBN 9781841621685.
