= Baptiste Veistroffer =

French cyclist

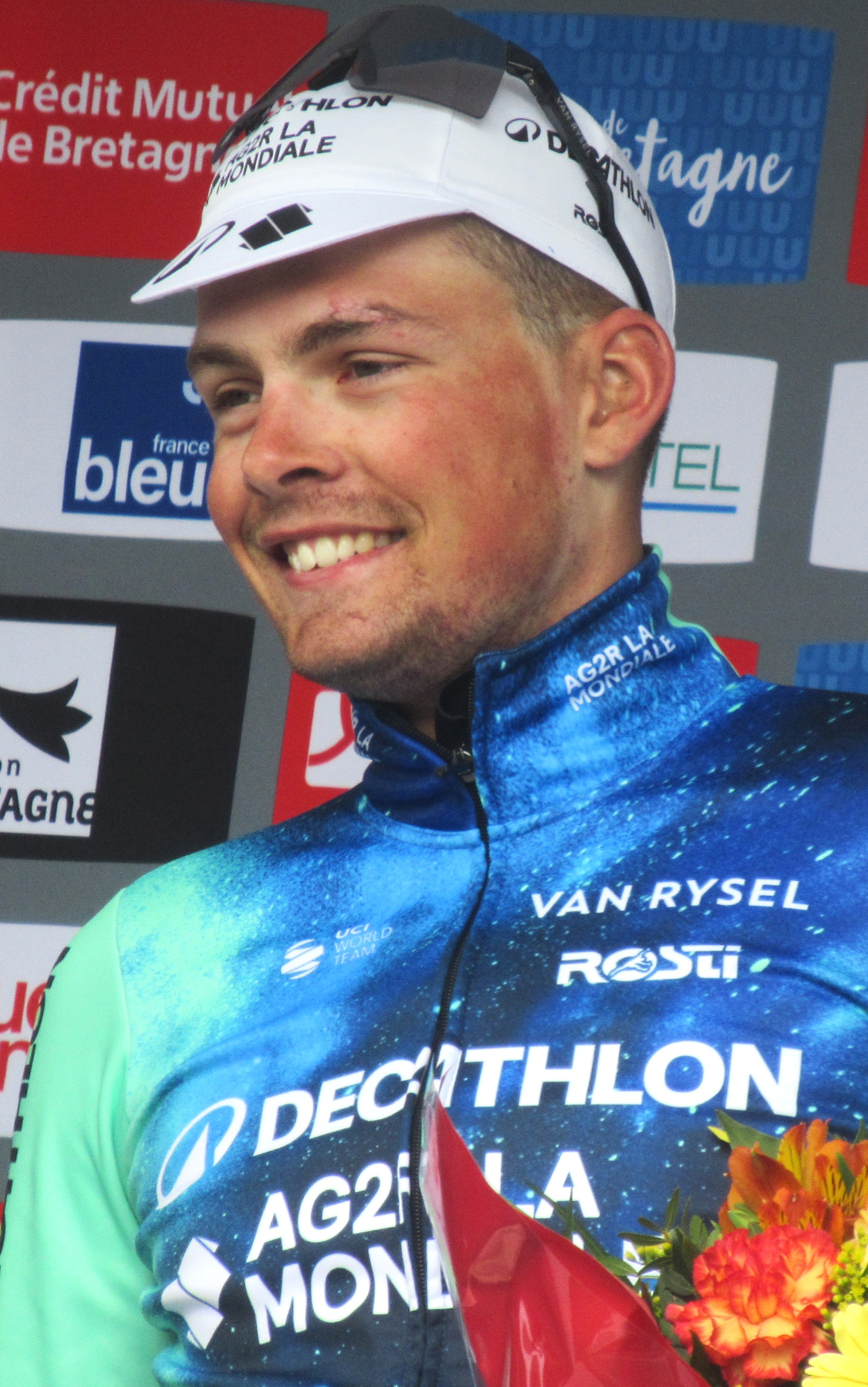
- Veistroffer in 2024

Personal information
- Born: 29 May 2000 (age 26) Vernon, France
- Height: 1.82 m (6 ft 0 in)
- Weight: 75 kg (165 lb)

Cycling career
- Sport: Cycling
- Current team: Lotto–Intermarché
- Discipline: Road
- Role: Rider

Amateur teams
- 2020–2021: UCK Vannes
- 2022–2023: VC Pays de Loudéac

Professional teams
- 2023: AG2R Citroën Team (stagiaire)
- 2024: Decathlon–AG2R La Mondiale Development Team
- 2025–: Lotto

Baptiste Veistroffer (born 29 May 2000) is a French road cyclist, who rides for UCI WorldTeam Lotto–Intermarché.

Veistroffer rose to prominence in the 2026 Tour de France, due to being in the breakaways on several stages. Most notably, on stage five, where he spent 144 km solo. He won most combative rider, an award he also won on stages seven and twelve.

== Major results ==
2022
2nd Grand Prix de la ville de Nogent-sur-Oise
8th Grand Prix de la Somme
2023
1st Boucles de l'Essor
3rd Grand Prix de Fougères
4th Circuit du Morbihan
2024
Tour de Bretagne

1st Sprints classification
1st Stage 4

1st Sprints classification, Tour d'Eure-et-Loir
10th Overall Tour Poitou-Charentes en Nouvelle Aquitaine
2026 (1 pro win)
1st Stage 2 Tour of Oman
1st Mountains classification, Tour of Guangxi
Tour de France

Combativity award Stages 5, 7 & 12
