= Figuerola =

Figuerola is a Hispanic surname. Notable people with the surname include:

- Agustín Figuerola (born 1985), Argentine rugby union footballer
- Enrique Figuerola (born 1938), Cuban sprinter
- Justo Figuerola (1771–1854), President of Peru
- Sebastià Figuerola (1919–1996), Catalan composer

== See also ==
- Figuerola del Camp, a municipality in Tarragona, Catalonia, Spain
