= Daniel Cavia =

Spanish cyclist (born 2000)

Personal information
- Full name: Daniel Cavia Sanz
- Born: 2 June 2002 (age 24) Laguna de Duero, Spain
- Height: 1.69 m (5 ft 7 in)
- Weight: 62 kg (137 lb)

Cycling career
- Sport: Cycling
- Current team: Burgos Burpellet BH
- Discipline: Road
- Role: Rider

Amateur teams
- 2019: E.C Tinlohi
- 2020: Atra Sport LPS Forestal
- 2021–2022: Eiser–Hirumet
- 2023: Gomur–Cantabria Infinita
- 2024: Padronés Cortizo

Professional team
- 2025–: Burgos Burpellet BH

Daniel Cavia Sanz (born 2 June 2002) is a Spanish cyclist, who currently rides for UCI ProTeam Burgos Burpellet BH.

== Major results ==
2023
1st Overall Vuelta a Cantabria

1st Stage 1

1st Stage 4 Volta a Castelló
1st Stage 4 Volta a Galicia
2024
1st Overall Copa de España amateur de ciclismo
1st Santikutz Klasika
1st Gran Premio Primavera de Ontur
1st Stage 3 Vuelta a Zamora
2025 (2 pro wins)
1st Overall Tour of Huangshan

1st Points classification
1st Mountains classification
1st Stage 2

7th Overall Tour de Taiwan

=== Grand Tour general classification results timeline ===
Grand Tour	2025
Giro d'Italia	—
Tour de France	—
Vuelta a España	DNF

Legend
—	Did not compete
DNF	Did not finish
IP	In progress
