= Jordi López =

Jordi López may refer to:

- Jordi López (cyclist) (born 1998), Spanish cyclist
- Jordi López (footballer) (born 1981), Spanish former footballer
