= Simone Gualdi =

Italian bicycle racer

Personal information
- Born: 16 April 2005 (age 21) Alzano Lombardo, Italy
- Height: 1.73 m (5 ft 8 in)
- Weight: 61 kg (134 lb)

Cycling career
- Sport: Cycling
- Current team: Lotto–Intermarché
- Discipline: Road
- Role: Rider
- Rider type: Climber

Amateur team
- 2022–2023: ASD Scuola Ciclismo

Professional teams
- 2024–2025: Wanty–Nippo–ReUz
- 2026–: Lotto–Intermarché

Simone Gualdi (born 16 April 2005) is an Italian cyclist, who currently rides for UCI WorldTeam Lotto–Intermarché.

== Major results ==
2022
4th Overall Giro della Lunigiana

1st Young rider classification

3rd Trofeo Comune di Vertova
5th Trofeo Buffoni
2023
1st Road race, National Junior Road Championships
2nd Overall Eroica Juniores
9th Coppa Andrea Meneghelli
2024
2nd Overall Triptyque Ardennais
4th Road race, National Under-23 Road Championships
4th Grote Prijs Stad Halle
9th Overall Giro della Valle d'Aosta
10th Circuit de Wallonie
2025
2nd Tour des 100 Communes
3rd Overall Grand Prix Jeseníky

1st Points classification
1st Young rider classification

3rd Road race, National Under-23 Road Championships
3rd Liège–Bastogne–Liège Espoirs
4th Road race, UEC European Under-23 Road Championships
6th Overall Circuit des Ardennes
9th Flèche Ardennaise
10th Trofeo Laigueglia
2026
5th Eschborn–Frankfurt
6th Philadelphia Cycling Classic
8th Trofeo Laigueglia
10th Tre Valli Varesine

=== Grand Tour general classification results timeline ===
| Grand Tour | 2026 |
|---|---|
| Giro d'Italia | 44 |
| Tour de France | — |
| Vuelta a España | — |

Legend
| — | Did not compete |
| DNF | Did not finish |
