= Adrià Pericas =

Spanish cyclist (born 2006)

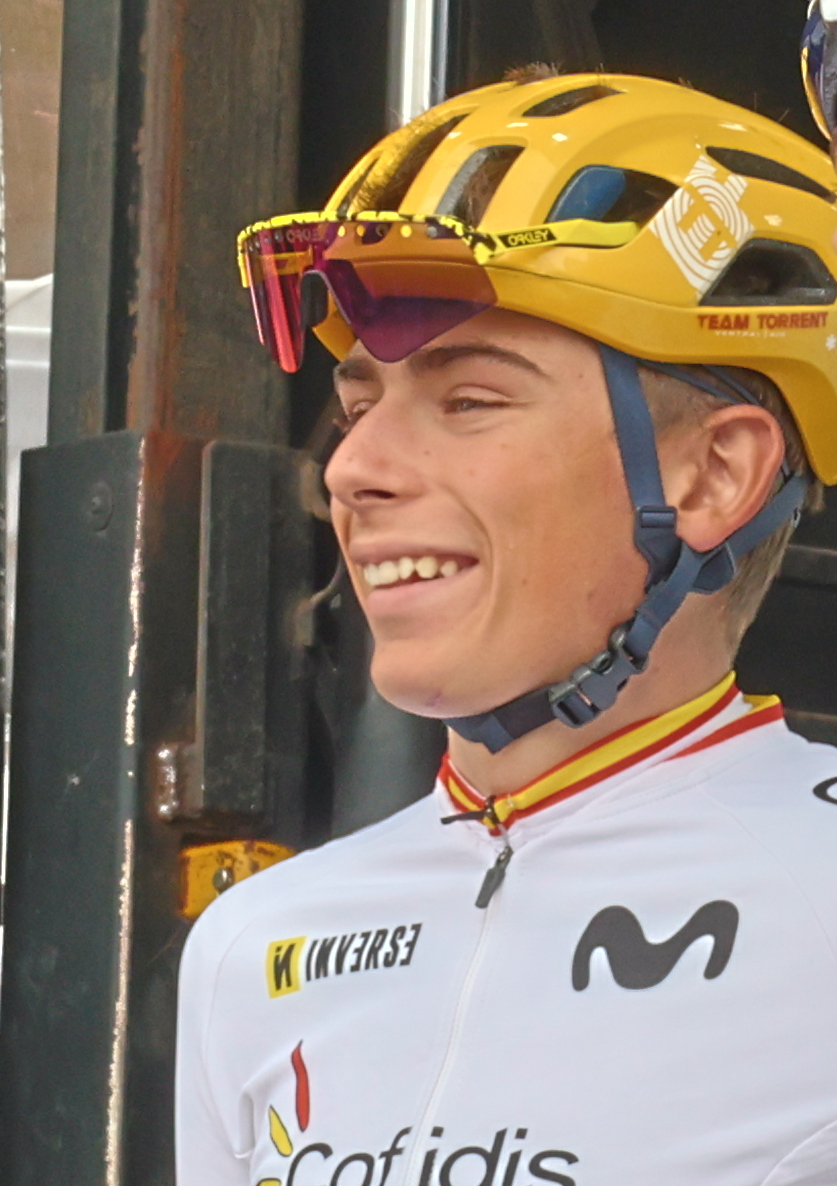
- Pericas in 2023

Personal information
- Full name: Adrià Pericas Capdevila
- Born: 26 May 2006 (age 20) Tona, Spain

Cycling career
- Sport: Cycling
- Current team: UAE Team Emirates XRG
- Discipline: Road
- Role: Rider

Amateur teams
- 2021: Jufré Vic–ETB
- 2022–2024: Team Torrent–Tadesan–Purito

Professional teams
- 2025: UAE Team Emirates Gen Z
- 2026–: UAE Team Emirates XRG

Adrià Pericas Capdevila (born 26 May 2006) is a Spanish cyclist, who currently rides for UCI WorldTeam UAE Team Emirates XRG.

== Major results ==
2023
1st GP Diputació
2nd Time trial, National Junior Road Championships
2nd Overall Vuelta a Talavera Juniors

1st Stage 3

2nd Overall Volta a Girona

1st Stage 3

2nd Challenge la Subbética
2nd Trofeu Mas de la Costa
3rd Mapei Classic
5th Overall Eroica Juniores

1st Mountains classification

8th Overall Tour du Valromey
2024
1st Time trial, National Junior Road Championships
1st Overall Vuelta al Besaya

1st Mountains classification
1st Stage 4

1st Overall Vuelta a la Montaña Central de Asturias

1st Mountains classification
1st Stages 3 & 4

1st Overall Vuelta a la Subbética

1st Points classification
1st Stages 1 & 2

1st Overall Volta a la Plana Baixa

1st Mountains classification
1st Stage 2

1st Overall GP F.W.R Baron

1st Stage 1 (TTT)

1st Gran Premi Les Franqueses KH7
1st Gran Premi Vila de Ripoll
1st Clásica Araba
2nd Overall Tour du Pays de Vaud
2nd La Classique des Alpes Juniors
2nd Trofeo Entrada de Toros y Caballos
2nd Trofeo Castillo de Onda
3rd Trofeo Ayuntamiento Castellnovo
8th Overall Tour du Valromey
2025
2nd Overall Istrian Spring Tour

1st Stage 2

4th Trofeo Piva
5th Overall Tour du Rwanda
6th Liège–Bastogne–Liège Espoirs
9th Road race, UCI Road World Under-23 Championships
9th Vuelta a Murcia
2026
8th Overall Giro di Sardegna
10th Eschborn–Frankfurt
