= 2026 UCI Europe Tour =

Season of UCI Europe Tour

- Twenty-second edition of the UCI Europe Tour

Details
- Dates: 23 January – October 2026
- Location: Europe
- Races: 10

The 2026 UCI Europe Tour is the 22nd season of the UCI Europe Tour.

Throughout the season, points are awarded to the top finishers of stages within stage races and the final general classification standings of each of the stages races and one-day events. The quality and complexity of a race also determined how many points were awarded to the top finishers, the higher the UCI rating of a race, the more points were awarded.

The UCI ratings from highest to lowest were as follows:

- Multi-day events: 2.Pro, 2.1 and 2.2
- One-day events: 1.Pro, 1.1 and 1.2

== Events ==
=== January ===
Races in the 2026 UCI Europe Tour
Race	Rating	Date	Winner	Team	Ref
(Spain) Clàssica Camp de Morvedre	1.1	23 January	Christian Scaroni (ITA)	XDS Astana Team	
(Spain) Gran Premio Castellón	1.1	24 January	Michael Matthews (AUS)	Team Jayco–AlUla	
(Spain) Clàssica Comunitat Valenciana	1.1	25 January	Dylan Groenewegen (NED)	Unibet Rose Rockets	
(Spain) Trofeo Calvià	1.1	28 January	António Morgado (POR)	UAE Team Emirates XRG	
(Spain) Trofeo Ses Salines	1.1	29 January	(Germany) Red Bull–Bora–Hansgrohe	Remco Evenepoel; Florian Lipowitz; Nico Denz; Maxim Van Gils; Mattia Cattaneo; Lorenzo Finn; Gianni Moscon	
(Spain) Trofeo Serra Tramuntana	1.1	30 January	Remco Evenepoel (BEL)	Red Bull–Bora–Hansgrohe	
(Spain) Trofeo Andratx - Pollença	1.1	31 January	Remco Evenepoel (BEL)	Red Bull–Bora–Hansgrohe	

=== February ===
Races in the 2026 UCI Europe Tour
Race	Rating	Date	Winner	Team	Ref
(France) Grand Prix La Marseillaise	1.1	1 February	Bryan Coquard (FRA)	Cofidis	
(Spain) Trofeo Palma	1.1	1 February	Arne Marit (BEL)	Red Bull–Bora–Hansgrohe	
(France) Étoile de Bessèges	2.1	4–8 February	Ewen Costiou (FRA)	Groupama–FDJ United	
(Turkey) Grand Prix Antalya	1.2	7 February	Mustafa Tarakcı (TUR)	Konya Büyükşehir Belediyespor	
(Spain) Vuelta a Murcia	2.1	13–14 February	Race is cancelled due to wind and safety concerns.		
(France) Tour de la Provence	2.1	13–15 February	Matthew Riccitello (USA)	Decathlon CMA CGM	
(Spain) Clásica Jaén	1.1	16 February	Tim Wellens (BEL)	UAE Team Emirates XRG	
(France) Classic Var	1.1	21 February	Jason Tesson (FRA)	Team TotalEnergies	
(Turkey) Grand Prix Alaiye	1.2	21 February	Pierre Barbier (FRA)	Terengganu Cycling Team	
(France) Tour des Alpes-Maritimes	1.1	22 February	Paul Lapeira (FRA)	Decathlon CMA CGM	
(Italy) Giro di Sardegna	2.1	25 February – 1 March	Filippo Zana (ITA)	Soudal–Quick-Step	
(Greece) Visit South Aegean GP	1.1	28 February	Bryan Coquard (FRA)	Cofidis	
(Turkey) Grand Prix Pedalia	1.2	28 February	Adne van Engelen (NED)	Terengganu Cycling Team	

=== March ===
Races in the 2026 UCI Europe Tour
Race	Rating	Date	Winner	Team	Ref
(Greece) Region on Dodecanese GP	1.1	1 March	Iván Cobo (ESP)	Equipo Kern Pharma	
(Belgium) Le Samyn	1.1	3 March	Jordi Meeus (BEL)	Red Bull–Bora–Hansgrohe	
(Croatia) Umag Classic	1.2	4 March	Adam Bradáč (CZE); Dušan Rajović (SRB)	Factor Racing; Solution Tech NIPPO Rali	
(Netherlands) Ster van Zwolle	2.1	7 March	Mathis Avondts (BEL)	Azerion / Villa Valkenburg	
(Greece) International Rhodes Grand Prix	1.2	7 March	Nikiforos Arvanitou (GRE)	Team United Shipping	
(France) Le Tour des 100 Communes	1.2	7 March	Matys Grisel (FRA)	Lotto–Groupe Wanty	
(Turkey) Grand Prix Apollon Temple	1.2	7 March	Mustafa Tarakcı (TUR)	Konya Büyükşehir Belediyespor	
(France) Grand Prix de la Ville de Lillers	1.2	8 March	Jules Hesters (BEL)	Team Flanders–Baloise	
(Croatia) Poreč Classic	1.2	8 March	Viggo Moore (USA)	Tirol KTM Cycling Team	
(Netherlands) Dorpenomloop Rucphen	1.2	8 March	Timothy Dupont (BEL)	Tarteletto–Isorex	
(Greece) International Tour of Rhodes	2.2	12–15 March	Matteo Scalco (ITA)	XDS Astana Development Team	
(Croatia) Istrian Spring Tour	2.2	12–15 March	Matisse Van Kerckhove (BEL)	Visma–Lease a Bike Development	
(Turkey) Tour of Antalya	2.2	12–15 March	Henrique Bravo (BRA)	Soudal–Quick-Step Devo Team	
(Italy) La Popolarissima	1.2	15 March	Davide Persico (ITA)	MBH Bank CSB Telecom Fort	
(Belgium) Youngster Coast Challenge	1.2U	20 March	Eliott Boulet (FRA)	Groupama–FDJ United Continental Team	
(Spain) Clásica Terres de l'Ebre	1.1	21 March	José Manuel Díaz (ESP)	Burgos Burpellet BH	
(Slovenia) GP Slovenian Istria	1.2	22 March	Nicolò Buratti (ITA)	MBH Bank CSB Telecom Fort	
(Portugal) Troféu Internacional da Arrábida	1.2	22 March	Enea Sambinello (ITA)	UAE Team Emirates Gen Z	
(Belgium) Grote Prijs Jean-Pierre Monseré	1.1	22 March	Dylan Groenewegen (NED)	Unibet Rose Rockets	
(Spain) Gran Premio Primavera Ontur	1.2	22 March	Axel van der Tuuk (NED)	Euskaltel–Euskadi	
(Italy) Settimana Internazionale di Coppi e Bartali	2.1	24–29 March	Mauro Schmid (SUI)	Team Jayco–AlUla	
(Netherlands) Olympia's Tour	2.2	25–29 March	Mads Andersen (DEN)	Swatt Club	
(Portugal) Volta ao Alentejo	2.2	25–29 March	Tiago Antunes (POR)	Efapel Cycling	
(Turkey) Grand Prix Syedra Ancient City	1.2	28 March	Rudolf Remkhi (KAZ)	Muğla Büyükşehir Belediyesi Spor Kulübü	
(France) Classic Loire Atlantique	1.2	28 March	Iúri Leitão (POR)	Caja Rural–Seguros RGA	
(Slovenia) Velika Nagrada Novega Mesta	1.2	29 March	Tommaso Nencini (ITA)	Solution Tech NIPPO Rali	
(France) La Roue Tourangelle	1.1	29 March	Clément Venturini (FRA)	Unibet Rose Rockets	
(France) Classic Annemasse Agglo	1.2	29 March	Rémi Daumas (FRA)	Groupama–FDJ United Continental Team	
(France) Paris–Camembert	1.1	31 March	Pierre Gautherat (FRA)	Decathlon CMA CGM	

=== April ===
Races in the 2026 UCI Europe Tour
Race	Rating	Date	Winner	Team	Ref
(France) Classic Velox Adélie de Vitré	1.1	3 April	Marc Brustenga (ESP)	Equipo Kern Pharma	
(Turkey) Grand Prix Alanya	1.2	3 April	Due to adverse weather conditions, the race was cancelled with 25 kilometers to go.		
(Netherlands) NXT Classic	1.1	4 April	Tibor Del Grosso (NED)	Alpecin–Premier Tech	
(France) Boucle de l'Artois	1.2	4 April	Cériel Desal (BEL)	Soudal–Quick-Step Devo Team	
(Italy) Trofeo Piva	1.2U	5 April	Riccardo Lorello (ITA)	S.C. Padovani Polo Cherry Bank	
(Belgium) Mur de Huy Classic	1.2U	6 April	Eike Behrens (GER)	Team Lotto–Kern Haus Outlet Montabaur	
(Italy) Giro del Belvedere	1.2U	6 April	Lorenzo Finn (ITA)	Red Bull–Bora–Hansgrohe Rookies	
(Italy) Gran Premio Palio del Recioto	1.2U	7 April	Lorenzo Finn (ITA)	Red Bull–Bora–Hansgrohe Rookies	
(France) Circuit des Ardennes International	2.2	8–12 April	Théo Hébert (FRA)	Vendée U Primeo Energie	
(Turkey) Tour of Mersin	2.2	9–12 April	Serdar Anıl Depe (TUR)	Spor Toto Cycling Team	
(Italy) Giro della Provincia di Reggio Calabria	1.1	10 April	Cancelled		
(Netherlands) Omloop van de Braakman	1.2	11 April	David Dekker (NED)	BEAT CC p/b Saxo	
(France) Paris-Roubaix Espoirs	1.2U	12 April	Davide Donati (ITA)	Red Bull–Bora–Hansgrohe Rookies	
(Italy) Trofeo Città di San Vendemiano	1.2U	12 April	Jan Jackowiak (POL)	Bahrain Victorious Development Team	
(Poland) Ślężański Mnich	1.2	12 April	Patryk Stosz (POL)	Voster Team	
(Spain) Clásica de Pascua	1.2	12 April	Mats Wenzel (LUX)	Equipo Kern Pharma	
(Italy) Giro della Magna Grecia	2.1	12–16 April	Cancelled		
(Spain) O Gran Camiño	2.1	14–18 April	Adam Yates (GBR)	UAE Team Emirates XRG	
(Belgium) Ronde van Limburg	1.1	15 April	Tim Merlier (BEL)	Soudal–Quick-Step	
(France) Tour du Loir-et-Cher	2.2	15–19 April	Marceli Bogusławski (POL)	ATT Investments	
(France) Classic Grand Besançon Doubs	1.1	17 April	Jordan Jegat (FRA)	Team TotalEnergies	
Tour of Bosnia and Herzegovina	2.2	17–19 April	Mihael Štajnar (SLO)	Pogi Team Gusto Ljubljana	
(France) Tour du Jura	1.1	18 April	Matthew Riccitello (USA)	Decathlon CMA CGM	
(Belgium) Liège–Bastogne–Liège U23	1.2U	18 April	Daan Dijkman (NED)	UAE Team Emirates Gen Z	
(Italy) Giro della Provincia di Biella	1.2	19 April	Andrea Piras (ITA)	Solution Tech NIPPO Rali	
(Bosnia and Herzegovina) Belgrade–Banja Luka	2.2	22–25 April	Dušan Rajović (SRB)	Serbia (national team)	
(Spain) Vuelta Asturias	2.1	23–26 April	Nairo Quintana (COL)	Movistar Team	
(France) Tour de Bretagne	2.2	25 April – 1 May	Aubin Sparfel (FRA)	Decathlon–CMA CGM Development Team	
(Italy) Gran Premio della Liberazione	1.2U	25 April	Mirko Bozzola (ITA)	S.C. Padovani Polo Cherry Bank	
(Italy) Giro dell'Appennino	1.1	26 April	Ludovico Crescioli (ITA)	Team Polti VisitMalta	
(United Kingdom) Rutland–Melton CiCLE Classic	1.2	26 April	Otto van Zanden (NED)	Azerion / Villa Valkenburg	

=== May ===
Races in the 2026 UCI Europe Tour
Race	Rating	Date	Winner	Team	Ref
(Portugal) Grande Prémio Anicolor	2.1	1–3 May	Alexis Guérin (FRA)	Anicolor / Campicarn	
(Austria) GP Vorarlberg	1.2	1 May	Santiago Umba (COL)	Solution Tech NIPPO Rali	
(Belgium) Omloop van het Waasland	1.2	1 May	Kenny Molly (BEL)	Van Rysel–Roubaix	
(Netherlands) Ronde van Overijssel	1.2	2 May	Patrick Eddy (AUS)	Team Brennan	
(Denmark) GP Herning	1.2	2 May	Mads Landbo (DEN)	Team ColoQuick	
(Belgium) Famenne Ardenne Classic	1.1	3 May	Arnaud De Lie (BEL)	Lotto–Intermarché	
(Denmark) Fyen Rundt	1.2	3 May	Mads Andersen (DEN)	Swatt Club	
(Netherlands) Slag om Woensdrecht	1.2	3 May	Roan Konings (NED)	Metec–Solarwatt p/b Mantel	
Tour of Greece	2.1	6–10 May	Václav Ježek (CZE)	Kasper Crypto4me	
(Belgium) La Vesdrienne	1.2	6 May	Jesper Stiansen (NOR)	Tudor Pro Cycling Team U23	
(Belgium) Flèche Ardennaise	1.2	7 May	Jack Ward (AUS)	Lidl–Trek Future Racing	
(Poland) Kryterium Asow Laguna Beskidów	1.2	7 May	Andrin Züger (SUI)	Run & Race–Solarpur	
(Norway) Sundvolden GP	1.2	9 May	Gustav Lovidius (SWE)	Svealand Cycling Team	
(Poland) Kryterium Asów - Beskid Race	1.2	9 May	Filip Řeha (CZE)	ATT Investments	
(Italy) Gran Premio Industrie del Marmo	1.2U	10 May	Matteo Gialli (ITA)	Hopplà–Petroli Firenze–Don Camillo	
(Belgium) Gent–Wevelgem U23	1.2U	10 May	Cameron Rogers (AUS)	Netcompany Ineos Racing Academy	
(Norway) Ringerike GP	1.2	10 May	Kevin Sandli Messel (NOR)	Team Ringerike	
(Poland) Kryterium Asów - Beskid Classic	1.2	10 May	Michael Kukrle (CZE)	Kasper Crypto4me	
Baku-Khankendi Azerbaijan Cycling Race	2.1	10–14 May	Josh Burnett (NZL)	Burgos Burpellet BH	
(Luxembourg) Flèche du Sud	2.1	13–17 May	Matisse Van Kerckhove (BEL)	Visma–Lease a Bike	
(Belgium) Circuit de Wallonie	1.1	14 May	Riley Sheehan (AUS)	NSN Development Team	
Volta a Portugal do Futuro	2.2U	14–17 May	Matvei Boldyrev	UAE Team Emirates Gen Z	
(France) Tour du Finistère	1.1	16 May	Jon Barrenetxea (ESP)	Movistar Team	
(Germany) Rund um Köln	1.1	17 May	Laurence Pithie (NZL)	Red Bull–Bora–Hansgrohe	
(France) Boucles de l'Aulne	1.1	17 May	Jon Barrenetxea (ESP)	Movistar Team	
(Italy) Circuito del Porto	1.2	17 May	Alessio Delle Vedove (ITA)	XDS Astana Development Team	
(Netherlands) Omloop der Kempen	1.2	17 May	Gustav Frederik Dahl (DEN)	Team Give Steel	
Tour of Albania	2.2	18–22 May	Niels Reemeijer (NED)	Wielerploeg Groot Amsterdam	
(France) Ronde de l'Isard	2.2U	20–24 May	Niels Driesen (BEL)	Lotto–Groupe Wanty	
(Portugal) GP Beiras e Serra da Estrela	2.1	20–24 May	Jesús David Peña (COL)	Efapel Cycling	
(Netherlands) Veenendaal-Veenendaal Classic	1.1	23 May	Matteo Moschetti (ITA)	Pinarello–Q36.5 Pro Cycling Team	
(Italy) Due Giorni Marchigiana – G.P. Santa Rita	1.2	23 May	Samuele Zoccarato (ITA)	MBH Bank CSB Telecom Fort	
(Belgium) Grand Prix Criquielion	1.1	24 May	Alessandro Borgo (ITA)	Team Bahrain Victorious	
(Italy) Due Giorni Marchigiana – Trofeo Città di Castelfidardo	1.2	24 May	Marco Manenti (ITA)	Bardiani–CSF 7 Saber	
(Belgium) Antwerp Port Epic	1.1	25 May	Per Strand Hagenes (NOR)	Visma–Lease a Bike	
(France) Paris–Troyes	1.2	25 May	Silas Köch (GER)	Team Lotto–Kern Haus Outlet Montabaur	
(France) Alpes Isère Tour	2.2	27–31 May	Matisse Van Kerckhove (BEL)	Visma–Lease a Bike Development	
Tour of Lithuania	2.2	27–31 May	Alexander Konychev (ITA)	China Anta–Mentech Cycling Team	
(Czech Republic) Peace Race	2.2U	28–31 May	Kamiel Eeman (BEL)	Belgium (national team)	

=== June ===
Races in the 2026 UCI Europe Tour
Race	Rating	Date	Winner	Team	Ref
(Italy) Trofeo Alcide De Gasperi	1.2	2 June	Filippo D'Aiuto (ITA)	General Store–Essegibi–Fratelli Curia	
(France) Mercan'Tour Classic	1.1	3 June	Ibon Ruiz (ESP)	Equipo Kern Pharma	
Tour of Estonia	2.1	4–6 June	Marceli Bogusławski (POL)	ATT Investments	
(Austria) Oberösterreich Rundfahrt	2.2	4–7 June	Henrique Bravo (BRA)	Soudal–Quick-Step Devo Team	
(France) Ronde de l'Oise	2.2	4–7 June	Patrick Eddy (AUS)	Team Brennan	
(Belgium) Heistse Pijl	1.1	6 June	Noah Hobbs (GBR)	EF Education–EasyPost	
Visegrad 4 Bicycle Race – GP Czech Republic	1.2	6 June	Piotr Pękala (POL)	ATT Investments	
(Italy) Coppa della Pace	1.2U	7 June	Riccardo Lorello (ITA)	S.C. Padovani Polo Cherry Bank	
Visegrad 4 Bicycle Race – GP Poland	1.2	7 June	Nikiforos Arvanitou (GRE)	Team United Shipping	
(Poland) Tour of Malopolska	2.2	11–14 June	Colin Stüssi (SUI)	Team Vorarlberg	
(Belgium) Dwars door het Hageland	1.1	13 June	Cancelled		
(Italy) Giro Next Gen	2.2U	14–21 June	Lorenzo Finn (ITA)	Red Bull–Bora–Hansgrohe Rookies	
(Switzerland) GP Gippingen	1.1	14 June	Liam Slock (BEL)	Lotto–Intermarché	
(Belgium) Muur Classic Geraardsbergen	1.1	14 June	Paul Magnier (FRA)	Soudal–Quick-Step	
(France) Route d'Occitanie	2.1	18–20 June	Davide Piganzoli (ITA)	Visma–Lease a Bike	
(Poland) Tour Szlakiem Mazurskich Twierdz	2.2	19–21 June	Rait Ärm (EST)	Energus Cycling Team	
Andorra MoraBanc Clàssica	1.1	21 June	Tom Pidcock (GBR)	Pinarello–Q36.5 Pro Cycling Team	
(Italy) Trofeo Città di Brescia	1.2	30 June	Luca Colnaghi (ITA)	Bardiani–CSF 7 Saber	

=== July ===
Races in the 2026 UCI Europe Tour
Race	Rating	Date	Winner	Team	Ref
(Italy) Lyon - Torino	2.1	1–3 July	Cancelled		
(Poland) Course de Solidarność et des Champions Olympiques	2.2	1–4 July	Marceli Bogusławski (POL)	ATT Investments	
(Romania) Sibiu Cycling Tour	2.1	4–7 July	Lorenzo Finn (ITA)	Red Bull–Bora–Hansgrohe	
(Italy) Giro del Medio Brenta	1.2	5 July	Davide De Cassan (ITA)	General Store–Essegibi–Fratelli Curia	
(Netherlands) Midden–Brabant Poort Omloop	1.2	5 July	Patrick Eddy (AUS)	Team Brennan	
(Belgium) BW Classic	1.2	5 July	Aless de Bock (BEL)	Alpecin–Premier Tech Development Team	
(France) Grand Prix de la ville de Nogent-sur-Oise	1.2	5 July	Hugo Théot (FRA)	Guidon Chalettois	
Tour of Austria	2.1	8–12 July	Gregor Mühlberger (AUT)	Austria (national team)	
(Portugal) Troféu Joaquim Agostinho	2.2	9–12 July	Tiago Antunes (POR)	Efapel Cycling	
(Hungary) Visegrad 4 Bicycle Race Kerekparverseny	1.2	11 July	Luca Cretti (ITA)	MBH Bank CSB Telecom Fort	
Visegrad 4 Bicycle Race GP Slovakia	1.2	12 July	Alessandro Verre (ITA)	MBH Bank CSB Telecom Fort	
(Italy) Tour of Valle d'Aosta - Mont-Blanc	2.2U	15–19 July	Henrique Bravo (BRA)	Soudal–Quick-Step Devo Team	
(Poland) Memoriał Andrzeja Trochanowskiego	1.2	21 July	Lars Rouffaer (NED)	EEW–VDK Cyclingteam	
(Poland) Dookoła Mazowsza	2.2	22–25 July	Michał Pomorski (POL)	ATT Investments	
(Spain) Prueba Villafranca de Ordizia	1.1	25 July	Guillermo Thomas Silva (URU)	XDS Astana Team	
(Spain) Clásica Castilla y León	1.1	26 July	Guillermo Thomas Silva (URU)	XDS Astana Team	
(Poland) Puchar MON	1.2	26 July	Marceli Bogusławski (POL)	ATT Investments	
(France) Grand Prix de la ville de Pérenchies	1.2	26 July	Maxime Jarnet (FRA)	Van Rysel–Roubaix	
(France) Tour de l'Ain	2.1	28–30 July	Markel Beloki (ESP)	EF Education–EasyPost	
(France) Tour Alsace	2.2	29 July – 2 August	Cancelled		
(France) Kreiz Breizh Elites	2.2	31 July – 3 August	Jermaine Zemke (GER)	Rembe / Rad-Net	
(France) Tour de Guadeloupe	2.2	31 July – 9 August	Owen Cole (USA)	Entreposage Bluebird Québec en vélo	

=== August ===
Races in the 2026 UCI Europe Tour
Race	Rating	Date	Winner	Team	Ref
(Spain) Circuito de Getxo	1.1	2 August	Natnael Tesfatsion (ERI)	Movistar Team	
(Turkey) Tour of Kahramanmaraş	2.2	4–7 August	Kyrylo Tsarenko (UKR)	Solution Tech NIPPO Rali	
Volta a Portugal	2.1	5–16 August	Alexis Guérin (FRA)	Anicolor / Campicarn	
(Romania) Tour of Szeklerland	2.2	6–8 August	Cancelled		
(Italy) Gran Premio di Poggiana Trofeo Bonin Costruzioni	1.2U	9 August	Nicolas Milesi (ITA)	Netcompany Ineos Racing Academy	
(Turkey) Ordu Coast to Summit	1.2	15 August	Kyrylo Tsarenko (UKR)	Solution Tech NIPPO Rali	
(Italy) Gran Premio Capodarco	1.2U	16 August	Jan Jackowiak (POL)	Bahrain Victorious Development Team	
(France) La Polynormande	1.1	16 August	Hugo Page (FRA)	Cofidis	
(Turkey) Ordu Black Sea Classic	1.2	16 August	Santiago Umba (COL)	Solution Tech NIPPO Rali	
(France) Tour du Limousin	2.1	18–21 August	Ewen Costiou (FRA)	Groupama–FDJ United	
(Czech Republic) West Bohemia Tour	2.2U	20–23 August	Václav Ježek (CZE)	Kasper Crypto4me	
(France) Tour de l'Avenir	2.2U	20–26 August	Lorenzo Finn (ITA)	Red Bull–Bora–Hansgrohe Rookies	
(Estonia) Baltic Chain Tour	2.2	21–23 August	Lauri Tamm (EST)	Estonia (national team)	
(Italy) Cycling at the 2026 Mediterranean Games ITT	1.2	22 August	Tiago Antunes (POR)	Portugal (national team)	
(Italy) GP Colli Rovescalesi	1.2	23 August	Andrii Ponomar (UKR)	General Store–Essegibi–Fratelli Curia	
(Netherlands) Slag om Norg	1.2	23 August	Cancelled		
(Italy) Cycling at the 2026 Mediterranean Games RR	1.2	24 August	Tommaso Dati (ITA)	Italy (national team)	
(France) Tour Poitou-Charentes en Nouvelle-Aquitaine	2.1	25–28 August	Maxime Decomble (FRA)	Groupama–FDJ United	
(Turkey) Tour of Samsun	2.2	27–30 August	Ramazan Yılmaz (TUR)	Konya Büyükşehir Belediyespor	
Tour of Bulgaria	2.2	29 August – 3 September	Antoni Muryj (POL)	Mazowsze Serce Polski	
(Slovenia) GP Kranj	1.1	30 August	Cancelled		
(Netherlands) Ronde van de Achterhoek	1.2	30 August	Roan Konings (NED)	Metec–Solarwatt p/b Mantel	
(Belgium) Ixina Classic	1.2	30 August	Killian Théot (FRA)	Van Rysel–Roubaix	
(France) Grand Prix de Plouay	1.2	30 August	Tommaso Bessega (ITA)	Team Polti VisitMalta	

=== September ===
Races in the 2026 UCI Europe Tour
Race	Rating	Date	Winner	Team	Ref
(Netherlands) ZLM Tour	2.1	2–6 September	Mathias Vacek (CZE)	Lidl–Trek	
(Turkey) Tour of Istanbul	2.1	3–6 September	Baptiste Vadic (FRA)	Team TotalEnergies	
Tour of Kosovo	2.2	3–5 September	Cancelled		
(Czech Republic) Okolo Jižních Čech	2.2	3–6 September	Mateusz Gajdulewicz (POL)	ATT Investments	
(Italy) Giro della Regione Friuli Venezia Giulia	2.2	3–6 September	Nicolò Garibbo (ITA)	Team UKYO	
(Germany) Sauerlandrundfahrt	2.2	3–6 September	Paul Fietzke (GER)	Red Bull–Bora–Hansgrohe Rookies	
(Belgium) Flanders Tomorrow Tour	2.2U	4–6 September	Mads Landbo (DEN)	Team ColoQuick	
(France) Grand Prix de la Somme	1.2	6 September	Cancelled		
(Italy) Giro di Toscana	1.1	9 September	Giulio Pellizzari (ITA)	Red Bull–Bora–Hansgrohe	
Tour of Romania	2.2	9–13 September	Barnabás Vas (HUN)	Team United Shipping	
(Armenia) Tour d'Arménie	2.2	10–13 September	Simone Raccani (ITA)	Team UKYO	
(Italy) Memorial Marco Pantani	1.1	12 September	Ion Izagirre (ESP)	Cofidis	
(Netherlands) Arno Wallaard Memorial	1.2	12 September	Max Kroonen (NED)	BEAT CC p/b Saxo	
(Italy) Trofeo Matteotti	1.1	13 September	Sakarias Koller Løland (NOR)	Uno-X Mobility	
(Belgium) GP Rik Van Looy	1.2	13 September	Daan Depuydt (BEL)	Baloise Verzekeringen–Het Poetsbureau Lions	
(Italy) Giro d'Abruzzo	2.1	15–18 September	Kévin Vauquelin (FRA)	Netcompany–Ineos	
(Slovakia) Okolo Slovenska	2.1	16–20 September	Lennert Van Eetvelt (BEL)	Lotto–Intermarché	
(Belgium) Kampioenschap van Vlaanderen	1.1	18 September	Tim Merlier (BEL)	Soudal–Quick-Step	
(Italy) Gran Premio del Lazio	1.1	19 September	Dorian Godon (FRA)	Netcompany–Ineos	
(Italy) Milano-Rapallo	1.2	19 September	Cancelled		
(Italy) Giro della Romagna	1.1	20 September	Cancelled		
(Italy) Giro di Campania	1.1	20 September	Eric Fagúndez (URU)	Burgos Burpellet BH	
(Belgium) Gooikse Pijl	1.1	20 September	Max Kanter (GER)	XDS Astana Team	
(France) Grand Prix d'Isbergues	1.1	20 September	Olav Kooij (NED)	Decathlon CMA CGM	
(Italy) Milano-Rapallo gara in linea	2.2	20 September	Cancelled		
(Belgium) Omloop van het Houtland	1.1	23 September	Tim Merlier (BEL)	Soudal–Quick-Step	
(France) Tour de la Mirabelle	1.2	25 September	Cancelled		
(Belgium) Grand Prix Cerami	1.2	26 September	Cériel Desal (BEL)	Soudal–Quick-Step Devo Team	
(France) Paris-Chauny	1.1	27 September	Pavel Bittner (CZE)	Team Picnic–PostNL	
(Italy) Ruota d'Oro	1.2U	29 September	Mattia Negrente (ITA)	XDS Astana Development Team	

=== October ===
Races in the 2026 UCI Europe Tour
Race	Rating	Date	Winner	Team	Ref
(France) Cholet Agglo Tour	1.1	3 October	Jenthe Biermans (BEL)	Cofidis	
(Italy) Il Lombardia Under 23	1.2U	3 October	Henrique Bravo (BRA)	Soudal–Quick-Step Devo Team	
(France) Tour de Vendée	1.1	4 October	Alexis Renard (FRA)	Cofidis	
(Italy) Coppa Agostoni	1.1	4 October	Paul Lapeira (FRA)	Decathlon CMA CGM	
(Belgium) Binche–Chimay–Binche	1.1	6 October	Paul Magnier (FRA)	Soudal–Quick-Step	
(Italy) Coppa Città di San Daniele	1.2	6 October	Max Bock (GER)	Red Bull–Bora–Hansgrohe Rookies	
(France) Paris–Tours Espoirs	1.2U	11 October	Héctor Álvarez (ESP)	Lidl–Trek Future Racing	
(Italy) Trofeo Tessile & Moda	1.1	11 October	Cancelled		
(Netherlands) Tour of Holland	2.1	13–18 October	Victor Campenaerts (BEL)	Visma–Lease a Bike	
(Serbia) Tour de Serbie	2.2	16–18 October	Samuele Zoccarato (ITA)	MBH Bank CSB Telecom Fort	
(France) Chrono des Nations Espoirs	1.2U	18 October	Nicolas Milesi (ITA)	Netcompany Ineos Racing Academy	
(France) Chrono des Nations	1.1	18 October	Remco Evenepoel (BEL)	Red Bull–Bora–Hansgrohe	
