= 2026 Settimana Internazionale di Coppi e Bartali =

Italian cycling race

2026 UCI Europe Tour

Race details
- Dates: 25–29 March 2026
- Stages: 5
- Distance: 819.7 km (509.3 mi)
- Winning time: 19h 01' 50"

Results
Jersey awarded to the overall winner	Winner	Mauro Schmid (SUI)	(Team Jayco–AlUla)
	Second	Axel Laurance (FRA)	(INEOS Grenadiers)
	Third	Alan Hatherly (RSA)	(Team Jayco–AlUla)
Jersey awarded to the points classification winner	Points	Mauro Schmid (SUI)	(Team Jayco–AlUla)
Jersey awarded to the mountains classification winner	Mountains	Kevin Pezzo Rosola (ITA)	(General Store–Essegibi–Fratelli Curia)
Jersey awarded to the young rider classification winner	Young rider	Andrew August (USA)	(INEOS Grenadiers)
	Team	(Germany) Red Bull–Bora–Hansgrohe	

The 2026 Settimana Internazionale di Coppi e Bartali was a road cycling stage race that took place between 25 and 29 March 2026 in the Italian region of Emilia-Romagna. The race was rated as a category 2.1 event on the 2026 UCI Europe Tour calendar, and was the 41st edition of the Settimana Internazionale di Coppi e Bartali.

== Teams ==
Seven of the 18 UCI WorldTeams, five UCI ProTeams, and eight UCI Continental teams made up the twenty teams that participated in the race.

UCI WorldTeams

- EF Education–EasyPost
- INEOS Grenadiers
- Red Bull–Bora–Hansgrohe
- Soudal–Quick-Step
- Team Jayco–AlUla
- Visma–Lease a Bike
- XDS Astana Team

UCI ProTeams

- Bardiani–CSF 7 Saber
- MBH Bank CSB Telecom Fort
- Pinarello–Q36.5 Pro Cycling Team
- Solution Tech NIPPO Rali
- Team Polti VisitMalta

UCI Continental Teams

- Biesse–Carrera–Premac
- General Store–Essegibi–Fratelli Curia
- MG.K Vis Costruzioni e Ambiente
- Petrolike
- S.C. Padovani Polo Cherry Bank
- Team Technipes #inEmiliaRomagna Caffè Borbone
- Team UKYO
- Tudor Pro Cycling Team U23

== Route ==
Stage characteristics and winners
Stage	Date	Course	Distance	Type	Winner
1	25 March	Barbaresco to Barolo	161.1 km (100.1 mi)	Hilly stage	Axel Laurance (FRA)
2	26 March	Lodi to Massalengo	158 km (98 mi)	Hilly stage	Filippo D'Aiuto (ITA)
3	27 March	Erbusco to Iseo	175.5 km (109.1 mi)	Hilly stage	Tommaso Dati (ITA)
4	28 March	Ponte di Piave to Valdobbiadene	159.6 km (99.2 mi)	Medium-mountain stage	Axel Laurance (FRA)
5	29 March	Cormons to Gemona del Friuli	165.5 km (102.8 mi)	Hilly stage	Mauro Schmid (SUI)
Total			763.4 km (474.4 mi)		

== Stages ==
=== Stage 1 ===
25 March 2026 — Barbaresco to Barolo, 161.1 km (100.1 mi)

Stage 1 Result (1–10)
Rank	Rider	Team	Time
1	Axel Laurance (FRA)	INEOS Grenadiers	3h 44' 52"
2	Mauro Schmid (SUI)	Team Jayco–AlUla	+ 0"
3	Diego Ulissi (ITA)	XDS Astana Team	+ 0"
4	Adrien Boichis (FRA)	Red Bull–Bora–Hansgrohe	+ 0"
5	Nicolò Garibbo (ITA)	Team UKYO	+ 0"
6	Federico Iacomoni (ITA)	Team UKYO	+ 0"
7	Milan Vader (NED)	Pinarello–Q36.5 Pro Cycling Team	+ 0"
8	Tommaso Bambagioni (ITA)	Team Technipes #inEmiliaRomagna Caffè Borbone	+ 0"
9	Alessandro Fancellu (ITA)	MBH Bank CSB Telecom Fort	+ 0"
10	Filippo Turconi (ITA)	Bardiani–CSF 7 Saber	+ 0"

General classification after Stage 1 (1–10)
Rank	Rider	Team	Time
1	Axel Laurance (FRA)	INEOS Grenadiers	3h 44' 42"
2	Mauro Schmid (SUI)	Team Jayco–AlUla	+ 4"
3	Diego Ulissi (ITA)	XDS Astana Team	+ 6"
4	Adrien Boichis (FRA)	Red Bull–Bora–Hansgrohe	+ 10"
5	Nicolò Garibbo (ITA)	Team UKYO	+ 10"
6	Federico Iacomoni (ITA)	Team UKYO	+ 10"
7	Milan Vader (NED)	Pinarello–Q36.5 Pro Cycling Team	+ 10"
8	Tommaso Bambagioni (ITA)	Team Technipes #inEmiliaRomagna Caffè Borbone	+ 10"
9	Alessandro Fancellu (ITA)	MBH Bank CSB Telecom Fort	+ 10"
10	Filippo Turconi (ITA)	Bardiani–CSF 7 Saber	+ 10"

=== Stage 2 ===
26 March 2026 — Lodi to Massalengo, 158 km (98 mi)

Stage 2 Result (1–10)
Rank	Rider	Team	Time
1	Filippo D'Aiuto (ITA)	General Store–Essegibi–Fratelli Curia	3h 43' 06"
2	Matteo Moschetti (ITA)	Pinarello–Q36.5 Pro Cycling Team	+ 9"
3	Tommaso Bessega (ITA)	Team Polti VisitMalta	+ 9"
4	Alessio Magagnotti (ITA)	Red Bull–Bora–Hansgrohe	+ 9"
5	Alessio Menghini (ITA)	Team Technipes #inEmiliaRomagna Caffè Borbone	+ 9"
6	Martin Svrček (SVK)	Soudal–Quick-Step	+ 9"
7	Axel Laurance (FRA)	INEOS Grenadiers	+ 9"
8	Adrien Boichis (FRA)	Red Bull–Bora–Hansgrohe	+ 9"
9	Thomas Pesenti (ITA)	Team Polti VisitMalta	+ 9"
10	Nicolò Arrighetti (ITA)	General Store–Essegibi–Fratelli Curia	+ 9"

General classification after Stage 2 (1–10)
Rank	Rider	Team	Time
1	Filippo D'Aiuto (ITA)	General Store–Essegibi–Fratelli Curia	7h 27' 48"
2	Axel Laurance (FRA)	INEOS Grenadiers	+ 9"
3	Mauro Schmid (SUI)	Team Jayco–AlUla	+ 13"
4	Diego Ulissi (ITA)	XDS Astana Team	+ 15"
5	Adrien Boichis (FRA)	Red Bull–Bora–Hansgrohe	+ 19"
6	Thomas Pesenti (ITA)	Team Polti VisitMalta	+ 19"
7	Samuele Battistella (ITA)	EF Education–EasyPost	+ 19"
8	Tommaso Bambagioni (ITA)	Team Technipes #inEmiliaRomagna Caffè Borbone	+ 19"
9	Federico Iacomoni (ITA)	Team UKYO	+ 19"
10	Santiago Umba (COL)	Solution Tech NIPPO Rali	+ 19"

=== Stage 3 ===
27 March 2026 — Erbusco to Iseo, 175.5 km (109.1 mi)

Stage 3 Result (1–10)
Rank	Rider	Team	Time
1	Tommaso Dati (ITA)	Team UKYO	3h 54' 14"
2	Mauro Schmid (SUI)	Team Jayco–AlUla	+ 0"
3	Diego Ulissi (ITA)	XDS Astana Team	+ 0"
4	Federico Iacomoni (ITA)	Team UKYO	+ 0"
5	Samuele Battistella (ITA)	EF Education–EasyPost	+ 0"
6	Adrien Boichis (FRA)	Red Bull–Bora–Hansgrohe	+ 0"
7	Filippo Turconi (ITA)	Bardiani–CSF 7 Saber	+ 0"
8	Thomas Pesenti (ITA)	Team Polti VisitMalta	+ 0"
9	Eliot Rowe (GBR)	Visma–Lease a Bike	+ 0"
10	Matteo Fabbro (ITA)	Solution Tech NIPPO Rali	+ 0"

General classification after Stage 3 (1–10)
Rank	Rider	Team	Time
1	Mauro Schmid (SUI)	Team Jayco–AlUla	11h 22' 09"
2	Tommaso Dati (ITA)	Team UKYO	+ 2"
3	Axel Laurance (FRA)	INEOS Grenadiers	+ 2"
4	Diego Ulissi (ITA)	XDS Astana Team	+ 4"
5	Adrien Boichis (FRA)	Red Bull–Bora–Hansgrohe	+ 12"
6	Thomas Pesenti (ITA)	Team Polti VisitMalta	+ 12"
7	Samuele Battistella (ITA)	EF Education–EasyPost	+ 12"
8	Federico Iacomoni (ITA)	Team UKYO	+ 12"
9	Filippo Turconi (ITA)	Bardiani–CSF 7 Saber	+ 12"
10	Mark Donovan (GBR)	Pinarello–Q36.5 Pro Cycling Team	+ 12"

=== Stage 4 ===
28 March 2026 — Ponte di Piave to Valdobbiadene, 159.6 km (99.2 mi)

Stage 4 Result (1–10)
Rank	Rider	Team	Time
1	Axel Laurance (FRA)	INEOS Grenadiers	3h 38' 05"
2	Mauro Schmid (SUI)	Team Jayco–AlUla	+ 0"
3	Riccardo Lorello (ITA)	S.C. Padovani Polo Cherry Bank	+ 0"
4	Nicolò Arrighetti (ITA)	General Store–Essegibi–Fratelli Curia	+ 0"
5	Giovanni Bortoluzzi (ITA)	General Store–Essegibi–Fratelli Curia	+ 0"
6	Diego Ulissi (ITA)	XDS Astana Team	+ 0"
7	Tommaso Dati (ITA)	Team UKYO	+ 0"
8	Alessio Menghini (ITA)	Team Technipes #inEmiliaRomagna Caffè Borbone	+ 0"
9	Filippo Turconi (ITA)	Bardiani–CSF 7 Saber	+ 0"
10	Federico Iacomoni (ITA)	Team UKYO	+ 0"

General classification after Stage 4 (1–10)
Rank	Rider	Team	Time
1	Axel Laurance (FRA)	INEOS Grenadiers	15h 00' 06"
2	Mauro Schmid (SUI)	Team Jayco–AlUla	+ 2"
3	Tommaso Dati (ITA)	Team UKYO	+ 10"
4	Diego Ulissi (ITA)	XDS Astana Team	+ 12"
5	Adrien Boichis (FRA)	Red Bull–Bora–Hansgrohe	+ 20"
6	Federico Iacomoni (ITA)	Team UKYO	+ 20"
7	Thomas Pesenti (ITA)	Team Polti VisitMalta	+ 20"
8	Samuele Battistella (ITA)	EF Education–EasyPost	+ 20"
9	Filippo Turconi (ITA)	Bardiani–CSF 7 Saber	+ 20"
10	Mark Donovan (GBR)	Pinarello–Q36.5 Pro Cycling Team	+ 20"

=== Stage 5 ===
29 March 2026 — Cormons to Gemona del Friuli, 165.5 km (102.8 mi)

Stage 5 Result (1–10)
Rank	Rider	Team	Time
1	Mauro Schmid (SUI)	Team Jayco–AlUla	4h 01' 52"
2	Axel Laurance (FRA)	INEOS Grenadiers	+ 0"
3	Alan Hatherly (RSA)	Team Jayco–AlUla	+ 3"
4	Giovanni Aleotti (ITA)	Red Bull–Bora–Hansgrohe	+ 22"
5	Matteo Fabbro (ITA)	Solution Tech NIPPO Rali	+ 22"
6	Thomas Pesenti (ITA)	Team Polti VisitMalta	+ 22"
7	Alessandro Fancellu (ITA)	MBH Bank CSB Telecom Fort	+ 22"
8	Kamiel Bonneu (BEL)	Solution Tech NIPPO Rali	+ 22"
9	Anton Schiffer (GER)	Visma–Lease a Bike	+ 22"
10	Andrew August (USA)	INEOS Grenadiers	+ 22"

General classification after Stage 5 (1–10)
Rank	Rider	Team	Time
1	Mauro Schmid (SUI)	Team Jayco–AlUla	19h 01' 50"
2	Axel Laurance (FRA)	INEOS Grenadiers	+ 2"
3	Alan Hatherly (RSA)	Team Jayco–AlUla	+ 27"
4	Thomas Pesenti (ITA)	Team Polti VisitMalta	+ 50"
5	Anton Schiffer (GER)	Visma–Lease a Bike	+ 50"
6	Matteo Fabbro (ITA)	Solution Tech NIPPO Rali	+ 50"
7	Andrew August (USA)	INEOS Grenadiers	+ 50"
8	Giovanni Aleotti (ITA)	Red Bull–Bora–Hansgrohe	+ 50"
9	Jardi Christiaan van der Lee (NED)	EF Education–EasyPost	+ 57"
10	Diego Ulissi (ITA)	XDS Astana Team	+ 1' 03"

== Classification leadership table ==
Classification leadership by stage
Stage	Winner	General classification	Points classification	Mountains classification	Young rider classification	Team classification
1	Axel Laurance	Axel Laurance	Axel Laurance	Patryk Goszczurny	Adrien Boichis	Team UKYO
2	Filippo D'Aiuto	Filippo D'Aiuto	Axel Laurance	Kevin Pezzo Rosola	Adrien Boichis	General Store–Essegibi–Fratelli Curia
3	Tommaso Dati	Mauro Schmid	Mauro Schmid	Kevin Pezzo Rosola	Adrien Boichis	Team UKYO
4	Axel Laurance	Axel Laurance	Mauro Schmid	Kevin Pezzo Rosola	Adrien Boichis	Bardiani–CSF 7 Saber
5	Mauro Schmid	Mauro Schmid	Mauro Schmid	Kevin Pezzo Rosola	Andrew August	Red Bull–Bora–Hansgrohe
Final		Mauro Schmid	Mauro Schmid	Kevin Pezzo Rosola	Andrew August	Red Bull–Bora–Hansgrohe

== Classification standings ==
Legend
Denotes the leader of the general classification	Denotes the leader of the mountains classification
Denotes the leader of the points classification	Denotes the leader of the young rider classification

=== General classification ===
Final General classification (1-10)
Rank	Rider	Team	Time
1	Mauro Schmid (SUI)	Team Jayco–AlUla	19h 01' 50"
2	Axel Laurance (FRA)	INEOS Grenadiers	+ 2"
3	Alan Hatherly (RSA)	Team Jayco–AlUla	+ 27"
4	Thomas Pesenti (ITA)	Team Polti VisitMalta	+ 50"
5	Anton Schiffer (GER)	Visma–Lease a Bike	+ 50"
6	Matteo Fabbro (ITA)	Solution Tech NIPPO Rali	+ 50"
7	Andrew August (USA)	INEOS Grenadiers	+ 50"
8	Giovanni Aleotti (ITA)	Red Bull–Bora–Hansgrohe	+ 50"
9	Jardi Christiaan van der Lee (NED)	EF Education–EasyPost	+ 57"
10	Diego Ulissi (ITA)	XDS Astana Team	+ 1' 03"

=== Points classification ===
Final points classification (1-10)
Rank	Rider	Team	Points
1	Mauro Schmid (SUI)	Team Jayco–AlUla	34
2	Axel Laurance (FRA)	INEOS Grenadiers	30
3	Diego Ulissi (ITA)	XDS Astana Team	15
4	Tommaso Dati (ITA)	Team UKYO	12
5	Adrien Boichis (FRA)	Red Bull–Bora–Hansgrohe	9
6	Federico Iacomoni (ITA)	Team UKYO	8
7	Alan Hatherly (RSA)	Team Jayco–AlUla	6
8	Riccardo Lorello (ITA)	S.C. Padovani Polo Cherry Bank	6
9	Tommaso Bessega (ITA)	Team Polti VisitMalta	6
10	Giovanni Aleotti (ITA)	Red Bull–Bora–Hansgrohe	5

=== Mountains classification ===
Final mountains classification (1-10)
Rank	Rider	Team	Points
1	Kevin Pezzo Rosola (ITA)	General Store–Essegibi–Fratelli Curia	20
2	Emanuele Ansaloni (ITA)	Team Technipes #inEmiliaRomagna Caffè Borbone	15
3	Patryk Goszczurny (POL)	Visma–Lease a Bike	12
4	Alan Hatherly (RSA)	Team Jayco–AlUla	8
5	Alessandro Verre (ITA)	MBH Bank CSB Telecom Fort	8
6	Andrea Pietrobon (ITA)	Team Polti VisitMalta	8
7	Andrea Cantoni (ITA)	MG.K Vis Costruzioni e Ambiente	8
8	Peter Øxenberg (DEN)	INEOS Grenadiers	8
9	Adrien Boichis (FRA)	Red Bull–Bora–Hansgrohe	6
10	Mauro Schmid (SUI)	Team Jayco–AlUla	6

=== Young rider classification ===
Final young rider classification (1-10)
Rank	Rider	Team	Time
1	Andrew August (USA)	INEOS Grenadiers	+ 19h 02' 40"
2	Luca Paletti (ITA)	Bardiani–CSF 7 Saber	+ 21"
3	Emil Herzog (GER)	Red Bull–Bora–Hansgrohe	+ 21"
4	Robin Donzé (SUI)	Tudor Pro Cycling Team U23	+ 21"
5	Juan Diego Quintero (COL)	Petrolike	+ 21"
6	Lorenzo Finn (ITA)	Red Bull–Bora–Hansgrohe	+ 21"
7	Viktor Soenens (BEL)	Soudal–Quick-Step	+ 21"
8	Filippo Turconi (ITA)	Bardiani–CSF 7 Saber	+ 1' 13"
9	Michele Bicelli (ITA)	Biesse–Carrera–Premac	+ 1' 13"
10	Matteo Scalco (ITA)	XDS Astana Team	+ 1' 13"

=== Team classification ===
Final teams classification (1-10)
Rank	Team	Time
1	(Germany) Red Bull–Bora–Hansgrohe	57h 08' 42"
2	(Italy) Solution Tech NIPPO Rali	+ 59"
3	(United States) EF Education–EasyPost	+ 59"
4	(Japan) Team UKYO	+ 2' 12"
5	(Mexico) Petrolike	+ 2' 31"
6	(Italy) Bardiani–CSF 7 Saber	+ 3' 51"
7	(Switzerland) Pinarello–Q36.5 Pro Cycling Team	+ 7' 19"
8	(Australia) Team Jayco–AlUla	+ 8' 11"
9	(Kazakhstan) XDS Astana Team	+ 8' 15"
10	(Hungary) MBH Bank CSB Telecom Fort	+ 9' 17"
