= 2026 O Gran Camiño =

Spanish cycling race

2026 UCI Europe Tour

Race details
- Dates: 14 – 18 April 2026
- Stages: 5
- Distance: 633 km (393 mi)
- Winning time: 14h 40' 53"

Results
Jersey awarded to the overall winner	Winner	Adam Yates (GBR)	(UAE Team Emirates XRG)
	Second	Jørgen Nordhagen (NOR)	(Visma–Lease a Bike)
	Third	Alessandro Pinarello (ITA)	(NSN Cycling Team)
Jersey awarded to the points classification winner	Points	Alessandro Pinarello (ITA)	(NSN Cycling Team)
Jersey awarded to the mountains classification winner	Mountains	Alessandro Pinarello (ITA)	(NSN Cycling Team)
Jersey awarded to the young rider classification winner	Young rider	Jørgen Nordhagen (NOR)	(Visma–Lease a Bike)
	Team	(Spain) Caja Rural–Seguros RGA	

The 2026 O Gran Camiño (English: The Great Way) was a road cycling stage race that took place from 14 to 18 April 2026 in the autonomous community of Galicia in northwestern Spain. The race was rated as a category 2.1 event on the 2026 UCI Europe Tour calendar and was the fifth edition of the O Gran Camiño.

== Teams ==
Four UCI WorldTeams, four UCI ProTeams, and eight UCI Continental teams made up the 16 teams that participated in the race.

UCI WorldTeams

- Movistar Team
- NSN Cycling Team
- Visma–Lease a Bike
- UAE Team Emirates XRG

UCI ProTeams

- Burgos Burpellet BH
- Caja Rural–Seguros RGA
- Equipo Kern Pharma
- Euskaltel–Euskadi

UCI Continental Teams

- Anicolor / Campicarn
- Aviludo–Louletano–Loulé
- Credibom / LA Alumínios / Marcos Car
- Efapel Cycling
- Feira dos Sofás–Boavista
- Meridian Racing p/b de la Uz
- Tavfer–Ovos Matinados–Mortágua
- Team Tavira / Crédito Agrícola

== Route ==
Stage characteristics and winners
Stage	Date	Course	Distance	Type	Stage winner
1	14 April	Torre de Hércules to Torre de Hércules	15 km (9.3 mi)	Individual time trial	Julius Johansen (DEN)
2	15 April	Vilalba to Barreiros	148.6 km (92.3 mi)	Hilly stage	Carlos Canal (ESP)
3	16 April	Carballo to Padrón	169 km (105 mi)	Hilly stage	Iván Romeo (ESP)
4	17 April	Xinzo de Limia to Alto de Cabeza de Meda	145.7 km (90.5 mi)	Mountain stage	Adam Yates (GBR)
5	18 April	As Neves to Monte Trega	154.7 km (96.1 mi)	Mountain stage	Alessandro Pinarello (ITA)
Total			633 km (393 mi)		

== Stages ==
=== Stage 1 ===
14 April 2026 — Torre de Hércules to Torre de Hércules, 15 km (9.3 mi) (ITT)

Stage 1 Result (1–10)
Rank	Rider	Team	Time
1	Julius Johansen (DEN)	UAE Team Emirates XRG	17' 43.733"
2	Rafael Reis (POR)	Anicolor / Campicarn	+ 15.790"
3	Nelson Oliveira (POR)	Movistar Team	+ 16.627"
4	Jørgen Nordhagen (NOR)	Visma–Lease a Bike	+ 28.126"
5	Jakub Otruba (CZE)	Caja Rural–Seguros RGA	+ 38.816"
6	Adam Yates (GBR)	UAE Team Emirates XRG	+ 40.428"
7	Patryk Goszczurny (POL)	Visma–Lease a Bike	+ 44.561"
8	Alessandro Pinarello (ITA)	NSN Cycling Team	+ 46.560"
9	Carlos Miguel Salgueiro (POR)	Team Tavira / Crédito Agrícola	+ 52.305"
10	Enzo Leijnse (NED)	Anicolor / Campicarn	+ 54.795"

General classification after Stage 1 (1–10)
Rank	Rider	Team	Time
1	Julius Johansen (DEN)	UAE Team Emirates XRG	17' 43"
2	Rafael Reis (POR)	Anicolor / Campicarn	+ 15"
3	Nelson Oliveira (POR)	Movistar Team	+ 17"
4	Jørgen Nordhagen (NOR)	Visma–Lease a Bike	+ 28"
5	Jakub Otruba (CZE)	Caja Rural–Seguros RGA	+ 39"
6	Adam Yates (GBR)	UAE Team Emirates XRG	+ 41"
7	Patryk Goszczurny (POL)	Visma–Lease a Bike	+ 45"
8	Alessandro Pinarello (ITA)	NSN Cycling Team	+ 46"
9	Carlos Miguel Salgueiro (POR)	Team Tavira / Crédito Agrícola	+ 53"
10	Enzo Leijnse (NED)	Anicolor / Campicarn	+ 55"

=== Stage 2 ===
15 April 2026 — Vilalba to Barreiros, 148.6 km (92.3 mi)

Stage 2 Result (1–10)
Rank	Rider	Team	Time
1	Carlos Canal (ESP)	Movistar Team	3h 13' 25"
2	Mats Wenzel (LUX)	Equipo Kern Pharma	+ 0"
3	Eric Fagúndez (URU)	Burgos Burpellet BH	+ 0"
4	Patryk Goszczurny (POL)	Visma–Lease a Bike	+ 0"
5	Anton Schiffer (GER)	Visma–Lease a Bike	+ 0"
6	Alessandro Pinarello (ITA)	NSN Cycling Team	+ 0"
7	Sven Mernik (SLO)	Visma–Lease a Bike	+ 0"
8	Abel Balderstone (ESP)	Caja Rural–Seguros RGA	+ 0"
9	Kevin Vermaerke (USA)	UAE Team Emirates XRG	+ 0"
10	Jesús David Peña (COL)	Efapel Cycling	+ 0"

General classification after Stage 2 (1–10)
Rank	Rider	Team	Time
1	Rafael Reis (POR)	Anicolor / Campicarn	3h 31' 24"
2	Nelson Oliveira (POR)	Movistar Team	+ 1"
3	Jørgen Nordhagen (NOR)	Visma–Lease a Bike	+ 12"
4	Jakub Otruba (CZE)	Caja Rural–Seguros RGA	+ 23"
5	Adam Yates (GBR)	UAE Team Emirates XRG	+ 25"
6	Patryk Goszczurny (POL)	Visma–Lease a Bike	+ 29"
7	Alessandro Pinarello (ITA)	NSN Cycling Team	+ 30"
8	Kevin Vermaerke (USA)	UAE Team Emirates XRG	+ 40"
9	Abel Balderstone (ESP)	Caja Rural–Seguros RGA	+ 42"
10	Julius Johansen (DEN)	UAE Team Emirates XRG	+ 42"

=== Stage 3 ===
16 April 2026 —Carballo to Padrón, 169 km (105 mi)

Stage 3 Result (1–10)
Rank	Rider	Team	Time
1	Iván Romeo (ESP)	Movistar Team	3h 52' 33"
2	Alessandro Pinarello (ITA)	NSN Cycling Team	+ 15"
3	Abel Balderstone (ESP)	Caja Rural–Seguros RGA	+ 15"
4	George Bennett (NZL)	NSN Cycling Team	+ 25"
5	Adam Yates (GBR)	UAE Team Emirates XRG	+ 25"
6	Jørgen Nordhagen (NOR)	Visma–Lease a Bike	+ 25"
7	Patryk Goszczurny (POL)	Visma–Lease a Bike	+ 44"
8	David Domínguez (ESP)	Feira dos Sofás–Boavista	+ 44"
9	Mats Wenzel (LUX)	Equipo Kern Pharma	+ 44"
10	Nelson Oliveira (POR)	Movistar Team	+ 44"

General classification after Stage 3 (1–10)
Rank	Rider	Team	Time
1	Alessandro Pinarello (ITA)	NSN Cycling Team	7h 24' 30"
2	Jørgen Nordhagen (NOR)	Visma–Lease a Bike	+ 0"
3	Nelson Oliveira (POR)	Movistar Team	+ 12"
5	Adam Yates (GBR)	UAE Team Emirates XRG	+ 16"
9	Abel Balderstone (ESP)	Caja Rural–Seguros RGA	+ 19"
1	Iván Romeo (ESP)	Movistar Team	+ 29"
6	Patryk Goszczurny (POL)	Visma–Lease a Bike	+ 40"
8	Kevin Vermaerke (USA)	UAE Team Emirates XRG	+ 51"
4	George Bennett (NZL)	NSN Cycling Team	+ 52"
10	Diego Uriarte (ESP)	Equipo Kern Pharma	+ 55"

=== Stage 4 ===
17 April 2026 — Xinzo de Limia to Alto de Cabeza de Meda, 145.7 km (90.5 mi)

Stage 4 Result (1–10)
Rank	Rider	Team	Time
1	Adam Yates (GBR)	UAE Team Emirates XRG	3h 37' 18"
2	Jørgen Nordhagen (NOR)	Visma–Lease a Bike	+ 46"
3	Alessandro Pinarello (ITA)	NSN Cycling Team	+ 1' 04"
4	José Félix Parra (ESP)	Caja Rural–Seguros RGA	+ 1' 13"
5	Abel Balderstone (ESP)	Caja Rural–Seguros RGA	+ 1' 16"
6	Jesús Herrada (ESP)	Burgos Burpellet BH	+ 1' 39"
7	Jan Castellon (ESP)	Caja Rural–Seguros RGA	+ 1' 40"
8	Iván Romeo (ESP)	Movistar Team	+ 1' 47"
9	Jesús David Peña (COL)	Efapel Cycling	+ 1' 54"
10	Jon Agirre (ESP)	Equipo Kern Pharma	+ 2' 10"

General classification after Stage 4 (1–10)
Rank	Rider	Team	Time
1	Adam Yates (GBR)	UAE Team Emirates XRG	11h 01' 54"
2	Jørgen Nordhagen (NOR)	Visma–Lease a Bike	+ 34"
3	Alessandro Pinarello (ITA)	NSN Cycling Team	+ 54"
4	Abel Balderstone (ESP)	Caja Rural–Seguros RGA	+ 1' 29"
5	Iván Romeo (ESP)	Movistar Team	+ 2' 09"
6	José Félix Parra (ESP)	Caja Rural–Seguros RGA	+ 2' 32"
7	Nelson Oliveira (POR)	Movistar Team	+ 2' 46"
8	George Bennett (NZL)	NSN Cycling Team	+ 3' 02"
9	Txomin Juaristi (ESP)	Euskaltel–Euskadi	+ 3' 07"
10	Kevin Vermaerke (USA)	UAE Team Emirates XRG	+ 3' 10"

=== Stage 5 ===
18 April 2026 — As Neves to Monte Trega, 154.7 km (96.1 mi)

Stage 5 Result (1–10)
Rank	Rider	Team	Time
1	Alessandro Pinarello (ITA)	NSN Cycling Team	3h 39' 3"
2	Jørgen Nordhagen (NOR)	Visma–Lease a Bike	+ 0"
3	Adam Yates (GBR)	UAE Team Emirates XRG	+ 0"
4	Iván Romeo (ESP)	Movistar Team	+ 6"
5	Txomin Juaristi (ESP)	Euskaltel–Euskadi	+ 16"
6	Abel Balderstone (ESP)	Caja Rural–Seguros RGA	+ 16"
7	Jesús Herrada (ESP)	Burgos Burpellet BH	+ 31"
8	Jesús David Peña (COL)	Efapel Cycling	+ 31"
9	José Félix Parra (ESP)	Caja Rural–Seguros RGA	+ 31"
10	Jesús del Pino (ESP)	Aviludo–Louletano–Loulé	+ 35"

General classification after Stage 5 (1–10)
Rank	Rider	Team	Time
1	Adam Yates (GBR)	UAE Team Emirates XRG	14h 40' 53"
2	Jørgen Nordhagen (NOR)	Visma–Lease a Bike	+ 32"
3	Alessandro Pinarello (ITA)	NSN Cycling Team	+ 48"
4	Abel Balderstone (ESP)	Caja Rural–Seguros RGA	+ 1' 49"
5	Iván Romeo (ESP)	Movistar Team	+ 2' 19"
6	José Félix Parra (ESP)	Caja Rural–Seguros RGA	+ 3' 07"
7	Txomin Juaristi (ESP)	Euskaltel–Euskadi	+ 3' 27"
8	George Bennett (NZL)	NSN Cycling Team	+ 3' 43"
9	Jesús Herrada (ESP)	Burgos Burpellet BH	+ 3' 48"
10	Artem Nych	Anicolor / Campicarn	+ 4' 05"

== Classification leadership table ==
Classification leadership by stage
Stage	Winner	General classification	Points classification	Mountains classification	Young rider classification	Team classification	Combativity award
1	Julius Johansen	Julius Johansen	Julius Johansen	William Smith	Julius Johansen	UAE Team Emirates XRG	Not awarded
2	Carlos Canal	Rafael Reis	Patryk Goszczurny	Tomas Contte	Jørgen Nordhagen	Anicolor / Campicarn	
3	Iván Romeo	Alessandro Pinarello	Alessandro Pinarello	Tomas Contte	Jørgen Nordhagen	Visma–Lease a Bike	
4	Adam Yates	Adam Yates	Alessandro Pinarello	Adam Yates	Jørgen Nordhagen	Caja Rural–Seguros RGA	
5	Alessandro Pinarello	Adam Yates	Alessandro Pinarello	Alessandro Pinarello	Jørgen Nordhagen	Caja Rural–Seguros RGA	
Final		Adam Yates	Alessandro Pinarello	Alessandro Pinarello	Jørgen Nordhagen	Caja Rural–Seguros RGA	Not awarded

== Final classification standings ==
Legend
Denotes the winner of the general classification	Denotes the winner of the mountains classification
Denotes the winner of the points classification	Denotes the winner of the young rider classification

=== General classification ===
Final general classification (1–10)
Rank	Rider	Team	Time
1	Adam Yates (GBR)	UAE Team Emirates XRG	14h 40' 53"
2	Jørgen Nordhagen (NOR)	Visma–Lease a Bike	+ 32"
3	Alessandro Pinarello (ITA)	NSN Cycling Team	+ 48"
4	Abel Balderstone (ESP)	Caja Rural–Seguros RGA	+ 1' 49"
5	Iván Romeo (ESP)	Movistar Team	+ 2' 19"
6	José Félix Parra (ESP)	Caja Rural–Seguros RGA	+ 3' 07"
7	Txomin Juaristi (ESP)	Euskaltel–Euskadi	+ 3' 27"
8	George Bennett (NZL)	NSN Cycling Team	+ 3' 43"
9	Jesús Herrada (ESP)	Burgos Burpellet BH	+ 3' 48"
10	Artem Nych	Anicolor / Campicarn	+ 4' 05"

=== Points classification ===
Final points classification (1–10)
Rank	Rider	Team	Points
1	Alessandro Pinarello (ITA)	NSN Cycling Team	113
2	Jørgen Nordhagen (NOR)	Visma–Lease a Bike	90
3	Adam Yates (GBR)	UAE Team Emirates XRG	85
4	Abel Balderstone (ESP)	Caja Rural–Seguros RGA	70
5	Iván Romeo (ESP)	Movistar Team	66
6	Patryk Goszczurny (POL)	Visma–Lease a Bike	48
7	George Bennett (NZL)	NSN Cycling Team	41
8	Mats Wenzel (LUX)	Equipo Kern Pharma	34
9	Carlos Canal (ESP)	Movistar Team	30
10	Julius Johansen (DEN)	UAE Team Emirates XRG	30

=== Mountains classification ===
Final mountains classification (1–10)
Rank	Rider	Team	Points
1	Alessandro Pinarello (ITA)	NSN Cycling Team	14
2	George Bennett (NZL)	NSN Cycling Team	13
3	Adam Yates (GBR)	UAE Team Emirates XRG	11
4	Samuel Fernández (ESP)	Caja Rural–Seguros RGA	10
5	Jørgen Nordhagen (NOR)	Visma–Lease a Bike	10
6	Sinuhé Fernández (ESP)	Burgos Burpellet BH	8
7	Martín Rey (ESP)	Burgos Burpellet BH	6
8	Lucas Lopes (POR)	Efapel Cycling	4
9	Anton Schiffer (GER)	Visma–Lease a Bike	3
10	Jan Castellon (ESP)	Caja Rural–Seguros RGA	3

=== Young rider classification ===
Final young rider classification (1–10)
Rank	Rider	Team	Time
1	Jørgen Nordhagen (NOR)	Visma–Lease a Bike	14h 41' 25"
2	Patryk Goszczurny (POL)	Visma–Lease a Bike	+ 8' 07"
3	Duarte Domingues (POR)	Credibom / LA Alumínios / Marcos Car	+ 9' 51"
4	Rafael Durães (POR)	Efapel Cycling	+ 15' 35"
5	Sven Mernik (SLO)	Visma–Lease a Bike	+ 17' 18"
6	Patrick Casey (IRL)	NSN Cycling Team	+ 31' 13"
7	Guilherme Mestre (POR)	Team Tavira / Crédito Agrícola	+ 33' 17"
8	Jacob Roy (CAN)	Meridian Racing p/b de la Uz	+ 35' 41"
9	Tomás Pombo (ESP)	Movistar Team	+ 37' 13"
10	Rafael Barbas (POR)	Tavfer–Ovos Matinados–Mortágua	+ 39' 59"

=== Teams classification ===
Final team classification (1–10)
Rank	Team	Time
1	(Spain) Caja Rural–Seguros RGA	44h 11' 08"
2	(Netherlands) Visma–Lease a Bike	+ 51"
3	(Spain) Burgos Burpellet BH	+ 5' 27"
4	(Portugal) Efapel Cycling	+ 10' 34"
5	(United Arab Emirates) UAE Team Emirates XRG	+ 10' 36"
6	(Spain) Movistar Team	+ 14' 42"
7	(Portugal) Anicolor / Campicarn	+ 18' 05"
8	(Spain) Euskaltel–Euskadi	+ 26' 21"
9	(Switzerland) NSN Cycling Team	+ 27' 04"
10	(Portugal) Credibom / LA Alumínios / Marcos Car	+ 44' 26"
