= Filippo D'Aiuto =

Italian bicycle racer

Personal information
- Born: 21 March 2002 (age 24) Monfalcone, Italy

Cycling career
- Sport: Cycling
- Current team: General Store–Essegibi–Fratelli Curia
- Discipline: Road
- Role: Rider

Amateur team
- 2019: Danieli 1914 Cycling Team

Professional teams
- 2022–2024: General Store–Essegibi–Fratelli Curia
- 2025: Petrolike
- 2026–: General Store–Essegibi–Fratelli Curia
- 2026: MBH Bank CSB Telecom Fort (stagiaire)

Filippo D'Aiuto (born 21 March 2002) is an Italian cyclist, who currently rides for UCI Continental team General Store–Essegibi–Fratelli Curia. He rides with General Store since 2022, save for 2025 when he joined the Mexican team Petrolike, and returning to General Store the following year. In August 2026, he signed for UCI ProTeam MBH Bank CSB Telecom Fort as stagiaire while still riding for his current team until the end of the season.

He was disqualified after winning the national level race Memorial Polese, in which he rode solo in front for 60 km, due to noncompliance technicalities regarding his brake levers, which changed after he crashed his bike earlier in the race. In March 2026, D'Aiuto won his first professional win in his career at the 2026 Coppi e Bartali, attacking solo from the peloton 6 km before the finish line. D'Aiuto won stage 3 of 2026 Giro d'Abruzzo, being the lone survivor of a breakaway earlier in the race to reach the finish before the peloton seconds behind him.

== Major results ==
2023
2nd GP Capodarco
2024
1st GP Capodarco
6th Giro della Romagna
2025
9th Coppa Città di San Daniele
2026 (2 pro wins)
1st Trofeo Alcide Degasperi
1st Stage 2 Settimana Internazionale di Coppi e Bartali
1st Stage 3 Giro d'Abruzzo
