= 2022 Adriatica Ionica Race =

Cycling race held in Italy

2022 UCI Europe Tour

Race details
- Dates: 4–8 June 2022
- Stages: 5
- Distance: 826.5 km (513.6 mi)

Results
Jersey awarded to the overall winner	Winner	Filippo Zana (ITA)	(Bardiani–CSF–Faizanè)
	Second	Natnael Tesfatsion (ERI)	(Drone Hopper–Androni Giocattoli)
	Third	Vadim Pronskiy (KAZ)	(Astana Qazaqstan Team)
Jersey awarded to the points classification winner	Points	Christian Scaroni (ITA)	(Italy)
Jersey awarded to the mountains classification winner	Mountains	Natnael Tesfatsion (ERI)	(Drone Hopper–Androni Giocattoli)
Jersey awarded to the young rider classification winner	Young rider	Filippo Zana (ITA)	(Bardiani–CSF–Faizanè)
	Team	Bardiani–CSF–Faizanè	

The 2022 Adriatica Ionica Race/Sulle Rotte della Serenissima was a road cycling stage race that took place between 4 and 8 June 2022 in the northeastern Italy. It was the fourth edition of the Adriatica Ionica Race and a category 2.1 event on the 2022 UCI Europe Tour. The race was won by Filippo Zana who didn't win a stage but finished second in two decisive stages.

== Teams ==
One UCI WorldTeam, six UCI ProTeams, nine UCI Continental teams, and one national team made up the seventeen teams that participated in the race. With six riders each, Giotti Victoria–Savini Due and Team Qhubeka were the only teams to not enter a full squad of seven riders.

The favorites for the overall race victory included; Lorenzo Fortunato (Eolo–Kometa), Sebastián Henao (Astana Qazaqstan Team), Santiago Umba (Drone Hopper–Androni Giocattoli), Christian Scaroni (Italy), Nicholas Dlamini (Team Qhubeka), Davide Rebellin (Work Service–Vitalcare–Vega), Henok Mulubrhan and Filippo Zana (Bardiani–CSF–Faizanè).

UCI WorldTeams

- Astana Qazaqstan Team

UCI ProTeams

- Bardiani–CSF–Faizanè
- Drone Hopper–Androni Giocattoli
- Eolo–Kometa
- Equipo Kern Pharma
- Euskaltel–Euskadi
- Team Novo Nordisk

UCI Continental Teams

- Cycling Team Friuli ASD
- General Store–Essegibi–Fratelli Curia
- Giotti Victoria–Savini Due
- MG.K Vis Colors for Peace VPM
- Team Corratec
- Team Colpack–Ballan
- Team Qhubeka
- Work Service–Vitalcare–Vega
- Zalf Euromobil Fior

National Teams

- Italy

== Route ==
The full race route details were revealed in a press conference on 10 June 2021.

Stage characteristics and winners
Stage	Date	Route	Distance	Type	Winner
1	4 June	Tarvisio to Monfalcone	193.8 km (120.4 mi)	Hilly stage	Christian Scaroni (ITA)
2	5 June	Castelfranco Veneto to Cima Grappa	174.6 km (108.5 mi)	Mountain stage	Natnael Tesfatsion (ERI)
3	6 June	Ferrara to Brisighella	141.3 km (87.8 mi)	Intermediate stage	Giovanni Carboni (ITA)
4	7 June	Fano to Numana	164.5 km (102.2 mi)	Flat stage	Riccardo Lucca (ITA)
5	8 June	Castelraimondo to Ascoli Piceno	152.3 km (94.6 mi)	Hilly stage	Christian Scaroni (ITA)
Total			826.5 km (513.6 mi)		

== Stages ==
=== Stage 1 ===
4 June 2022 – Tarvisio to Monfalcone, 193.8 km (120.4 mi)

Stage 1 Result
Rank	Rider	Team	Time
1	Christian Scaroni (ITA)	Italy	3h 43' 48"
2	Filippo Zana (ITA)	Bardiani–CSF–Faizanè	+ 0"
3	Raúl García Pierna (ESP)	Equipo Kern Pharma	+ 0"
4	Riccardo Lucca (ITA)	Work Service–Vitalcare–Vega	+ 0"
5	Mikel Iturria (ESP)	Euskaltel–Euskadi	+ 5"
6	Davide Persico (ITA)	Team Colpack–Ballan	+ 19"
7	Matteo Malucelli (ITA)	Italy	+ 19"
8	Nicolas Dalla Valle (ITA)	Giotti Victoria–Savini Due	+ 19"
9	Samuele Zambelli (ITA)	Work Service–Vitalcare–Vega	+ 19"
10	Sacha Modolo (ITA)	Bardiani–CSF–Faizanè	+ 19"

General classification after Stage 1
Rank	Rider	Team	Time
1	Christian Scaroni (ITA)	Italy	3h 43' 48"
2	Filippo Zana (ITA)	Bardiani–CSF–Faizanè	+ 4"
3	Raúl García Pierna (ESP)	Equipo Kern Pharma	+ 6"
4	Riccardo Lucca (ITA)	Work Service–Vitalcare–Vega	+ 10"
5	Mikel Iturria (ESP)	Euskaltel–Euskadi	+ 15"
6	Davide Persico (ITA)	Team Colpack–Ballan	+ 29"
7	Nicolas Dalla Valle (ITA)	Giotti Victoria–Savini Due	+ 29"
8	Samuele Zambelli (ITA)	Work Service–Vitalcare–Vega	+ 29"
9	Sacha Modolo (ITA)	Bardiani–CSF–Faizanè	+ 29"
10	Francesco Carollo (ITA)	MG.K Vis Colors for Peace VPM	+ 29"

=== Stage 2 ===
5 June 2022 – Castelfranco Veneto to Cima Grappa 174.6 km (108.5 mi)

Stage 2 Result
Rank	Rider	Team	Time
1	Natnael Tesfatsion (ERI)	Drone Hopper–Androni Giocattoli	4h 12' 15"
2	Filippo Zana (ITA)	Bardiani–CSF–Faizanè	+ 0"
3	Vadim Pronskiy (KAZ)	Astana Qazaqstan Team	+ 0"
4	Luca Covili (ITA)	Bardiani–CSF–Faizanè	+ 8"
5	Jefferson Alexander Cepeda (ECU)	Drone Hopper–Androni Giocattoli	+ 12"
6	Mikel Bizkarra (ESP)	Euskaltel–Euskadi	+ 19"
7	Lorenzo Fortunato (ITA)	Eolo–Kometa	+ 42"
8	Christian Scaroni (ITA)	Italy	+ 1' 04"
9	Samuele Zoccarato (ITA)	Bardiani–CSF–Faizanè	+ 1' 04"
10	Riccardo Lucca (ITA)	Work Service–Vitalcare–Vega	+ 2' 10"

General classification after Stage 2
Rank	Rider	Team	Time
1	Filippo Zana (ITA)	Bardiani–CSF–Faizanè	7h 55' 51"
2	Natnael Tesfatsion (ERI)	Drone Hopper–Androni Giocattoli	+ 21"
3	Vadim Pronskiy (KAZ)	Astana Qazaqstan Team	+ 27"
4	Luca Covili (ITA)	Bardiani–CSF–Faizanè	+ 39"
5	Jefferson Alexander Cepeda (ECU)	Drone Hopper–Androni Giocattoli	+ 43"
6	Mikel Bizkarra (ESP)	Euskaltel–Euskadi	+ 50"
7	Christian Scaroni (ITA)	Italy	+ 1' 06"
8	Riccardo Lucca (ITA)	Work Service–Vitalcare–Vega	+ 2' 22"
9	Edoardo Sandri (ITA)	Cycling Team Friuli ASD	+ 3' 46"
10	Lorenzo Fortunato (ITA)	Eolo–Kometa	+ 4' 03"

=== Stage 3 ===
6 June 2022 – Ferrara to Brisighella 141.3 km (87.8 mi)

Stage 3 Result
Rank	Rider	Team	Time
1	Giovanni Carboni (ITA)	Italy	3h 25' 37"
2	Natnael Tesfatsion (ERI)	Drone Hopper–Androni Giocattoli	+ 25"
3	Paul Double (GBR)	MG.K Vis Colors for Peace VPM	+ 25"
4	Filippo Zana (ITA)	Bardiani–CSF–Faizanè	+ 25"
5	Vadim Pronskiy (KAZ)	Astana Qazaqstan Team	+ 28"
6	Luca Covili (ITA)	Bardiani–CSF–Faizanè	+ 28"
7	Henok Mulubrhan (ERI)	Bardiani–CSF–Faizanè	+ 33"
8	Jefferson Alexander Cepeda (ECU)	Drone Hopper–Androni Giocattoli	+ 38"
9	Lorenzo Fortunato (ITA)	Eolo–Kometa	+ 28" (Note: Fortunato crashed from the bunch that finished at 28s so received the same time as them even though he crossed the line 9th)
10	Alessandro Fancellu (ITA)	Eolo–Kometa	+ 1' 26"

General classification after Stage 3
Rank	Rider	Team	Time
1	Filippo Zana (ITA)	Bardiani–CSF–Faizanè	11h 21' 53"
2	Natnael Tesfatsion (ERI)	Drone Hopper–Androni Giocattoli	+ 15"
3	Vadim Pronskiy (KAZ)	Astana Qazaqstan Team	+ 30"
4	Luca Covili (ITA)	Bardiani–CSF–Faizanè	+ 42"
5	Jefferson Alexander Cepeda (ECU)	Drone Hopper–Androni Giocattoli	+ 56"
6	Mikel Bizkarra (ESP)	Euskaltel–Euskadi	+ 1' 55"
7	Lorenzo Fortunato (ITA)	Eolo–Kometa	+ 4' 06"
8	Edoardo Sandri (ITA)	Cycling Team Friuli ASD	+ 4' 48"
9	Paul Double (GBR)	MG.K Vis Colors for Peace VPM	+ 4' 59"
10	Oliver Stockwell (GBR)	Cycling Team Friuli ASD	+ 6' 17"

=== Stage 4 ===
7 June 2022 – Fano to Numana 164.5 km (102.2 mi)

Stage 4 Result
Rank	Rider	Team	Time
1	Riccardo Lucca (ITA)	Work Service–Vitalcare–Vega	3h 47' 41"
2	Emil Dima (ROM)	Giotti Victoria–Savini Due	+ 24"
3	Riccardo Verza (ITA)	Zalf Euromobil Fior	+ 28"
4	Enrico Battaglin (ITA)	Bardiani–CSF–Faizanè	+ 28"
5	Joan Bou (ESP)	Euskaltel–Euskadi	+ 32"
6	Antonio Nibali (ITA)	Astana Qazaqstan Team	+ 34"
7	Raúl García Pierna (ESP)	Equipo Kern Pharma	+ 40"
8	Natnael Tesfatsion (ERI)	Drone Hopper–Androni Giocattoli	+ 1' 10"
9	Filippo Zana (ITA)	Bardiani–CSF–Faizanè	+ 1' 10"
10	Vadim Pronskiy (KAZ)	Astana Qazaqstan Team	+ 1' 10"

General classification after Stage 4
Rank	Rider	Team	Time
1	Filippo Zana (ITA)	Bardiani–CSF–Faizanè	15h 10' 44"
2	Natnael Tesfatsion (ERI)	Drone Hopper–Androni Giocattoli	+ 15"
3	Vadim Pronskiy (KAZ)	Astana Qazaqstan Team	+ 30"
4	Luca Covili (ITA)	Bardiani–CSF–Faizanè	+ 51"
5	Jefferson Alexander Cepeda (ECU)	Drone Hopper–Androni Giocattoli	+ 1' 16"
6	Mikel Bizkarra (ESP)	Euskaltel–Euskadi	+ 2' 04"
7	Lorenzo Fortunato (ITA)	Eolo–Kometa	+ 4' 26"
8	Edoardo Sandri (ITA)	Cycling Team Friuli ASD	+ 5' 08"
9	Paul Double (GBR)	MG.K Vis Colors for Peace VPM	+ 5' 19"
10	Oliver Stockwell (GBR)	Cycling Team Friuli ASD	+ 6' 41"

=== Stage 5 ===
8 June 2022 – Castelraimondo to Ascoli Piceno 152.3 km (94.6 mi)

Stage 5 Result
Rank	Rider	Team	Time
1	Christian Scaroni (ITA)	Italy	3h 34' 06"
2	Pau Miquel (ESP)	Equipo Kern Pharma	+ 0"
3	Veljko Stojnić (SER)	Team Corratec	+ 0"
4	Manuele Boaro (ITA)	Astana Qazaqstan Team	+ 0"
5	Paul Wright (NZL)	MG.K Vis Colors for Peace VPM	+ 0"
6	Diego Pablo Sevilla (ESP)	Eolo–Kometa	+ 0"
7	Alessandro Fancellu (ITA)	Eolo–Kometa	+ 0"
8	Edoardo Zardini (ITA)	Drone Hopper–Androni Giocattoli	+ 0"
9	Raúl García Pierna (ESP)	Equipo Kern Pharma	+ 0"
10	Diego Lopez (ESP)	Equipo Kern Pharma	+ 0"

== Classification leadership table ==
Classification leadership by stage
Stage	Winner	General classification	Points classification	Mountains classification	Young rider classification	Team classification
1	Christian Scaroni	Christian Scaroni	Christian Scaroni	Paul Double	Filippo Zana	Work Service–Vitalcare–Vega
2	Natnael Tesfatsion	Filippo Zana	Filippo Zana	Natnael Tesfatsion	Filippo Zana	Bardiani–CSF–Faizanè
3	Giovanni Carboni	Filippo Zana	Filippo Zana	Natnael Tesfatsion	Filippo Zana	Bardiani–CSF–Faizanè
4	Riccardo Lucca	Filippo Zana	Riccardo Lucca	Natnael Tesfatsion	Filippo Zana	Bardiani–CSF–Faizanè
5	Christian Scaroni	Filippo Zana	Christian Scaroni	Natnael Tesfatsion	Filippo Zana	Bardiani–CSF–Faizanè
Final		Filippo Zana	Christian Scaroni	Natnael Tesfatsion	Filippo Zana	Bardiani–CSF–Faizanè

=== Notes ===
- On stage 2 third placed in the points competition, Raúl García Pierna, wore the red points jersey as first placed Christian Scaroni wore the blue jersey as overall leader and second placed Filippo Zana wore white as young rider leader.
- On stage 3 Edoardo Sandri wore the youth jersey as leader Filippo Zana already wore the blue jersey. Also Christian Scaroni wore the points jersey for the same reason.

== Final classification standings ==
Legend
Denotes the winner of the general classification	Denotes the winner of the mountains classification
Denotes the winner of the points classification	Denotes the winner of the young rider classification

=== General classification ===
Final general classification (1–10)
Rank	Rider	Team	Time
1	Filippo Zana (ITA)	Bardiani–CSF–Faizanè	18h 46' 19"
2	Natnael Tesfatsion (ERI)	Drone Hopper–Androni Giocattoli	+ 15"
3	Vadim Pronskiy (KAZ)	Astana Qazaqstan Team	+ 30"
4	Luca Covili (ITA)	Bardiani–CSF–Faizanè	+ 51"
5	Jefferson Alexander Cepeda (ECU)	Drone Hopper–Androni Giocattoli	+ 1' 16"
6	Mikel Bizkarra (ESP)	Euskaltel–Euskadi	+ 2' 04"
7	Lorenzo Fortunato (ITA)	Eolo–Kometa	+ 4' 26"
8	Edoardo Sandri (ITA)	Cycling Team Friuli ASD	+ 5' 08"
9	Paul Double (GBR)	MG.K Vis Colors for Peace VPM	+ 5' 19"
10	Oliver Stockwell (GBR)	Cycling Team Friuli ASD	+ 6' 41"

=== Points classification ===
Final points classification (1–10)
Rank	Rider	Team	Points
1	Christian Scaroni (ITA)	Italy	58
2	Riccardo Lucca (ITA)	Work Service–Vitalcare–Vega	44
3	Alessandro Fancellu (ITA)	Eolo–Kometa	44
4	Filippo Zana (ITA)	Bardiani–CSF–Faizanè	40
5	Natnael Tesfatsion (ERI)	Drone Hopper–Androni Giocattoli	36
6	Giovanni Carboni (ITA)	Italy	31
7	Matteo Zurlo (ITA)	Zalf Euromobil Fior	21
8	Mikel Bizkarra (ESP)	Euskaltel–Euskadi	21
9	Pau Miquel (ESP)	Equipo Kern Pharma	20
10	Raúl García Pierna (ESP)	Equipo Kern Pharma	19

=== Mountains classification ===
Final mountains classification (1–10)
Rank	Rider	Team	Points
1	Natnael Tesfatsion (ERI)	Drone Hopper–Androni Giocattoli	10
2	Alessandro Fancellu (ITA)	Eolo–Kometa	10
3	Filippo Zana (ITA)	Bardiani–CSF–Faizanè	8
4	Edoardo Zardini (ITA)	Drone Hopper–Androni Giocattoli	8
5	Riccardo Lucca (ITA)	Work Service–Vitalcare–Vega	7
6	Luca Covili (ITA)	Bardiani–CSF–Faizanè	7
7	Antonio Nibali (ITA)	Astana Qazaqstan Team	7
8	Giovanni Carboni (ITA)	Italy	6
9	Vadim Pronskiy (KAZ)	Astana Qazaqstan Team	6
10	Paul Double (GBR)	MG.K Vis Colors for Peace VPM	5

=== Young rider classification ===
Final young rider classification (1–10)
Rank	Rider	Team	Time
1	Filippo Zana (ITA)	Bardiani–CSF–Faizanè	18h 46' 19"
2	Natnael Tesfatsion (ERI)	Drone Hopper–Androni Giocattoli	+ 15"
3	Edoardo Sandri (ITA)	Cycling Team Friuli ASD	+ 5' 08"
4	Oliver Stockwell (GBR)	Cycling Team Friuli ASD	+ 6' 41"
5	Alessandro Fancellu (ITA)	Eolo–Kometa	+ 8' 52"
6	Negasi Haylu Abreha (ETH)	Team Qhubeka	+ 12' 03"
7	Alex Martin (ESP)	Eolo–Kometa	+ 15' 02"
8	Henok Mulubrhan (ERI)	Bardiani–CSF–Faizanè	+ 17' 23"
9	Carlos García Pierna (ESP)	Equipo Kern Pharma	+ 25' 00"
10	Santiago Umba (COL)	Drone Hopper–Androni Giocattoli	+ 27' 43"

=== Team classification ===
Final team classification (1–10)
Rank	Team	Time
1	Bardiani–CSF–Faizanè	56h 21' 21"
2	Drone Hopper–Androni Giocattoli	+ 4' 45"
3	Eolo–Kometa	+ 12' 25"
4	Euskaltel–Euskadi	+ 22' 42"
5	Work Service–Vitalcare–Vega	+ 28' 08"
6	Astana Qazaqstan Team	+ 39' 02"
7	Cycling Team Friuli ASD	+ 1h 15' 55"
8	Team Qhubeka	+ 1h 16' 45"
9	Equipo Kern Pharma	+ 1h 16' 59"
10	Zalf Euromobil Fior	+ 1h 23' 17"

== Notes ==
=== Sources ===
- Adriatica Ionica Race Roadbook 2022 Il Marcopolo (PDF). ASD Sport Union. 2022.
