= List of cycling races in Spain =

This is a list of men's cycling races in Spain. This list only includes road races that are part of the UCI World Tour or UCI Europe Tour.

== One day races ==
=== UCI World Tour ===
- Clásica de San Sebastián

=== UCI Europe Tour ===
==== 1.Pro ====
- GP Miguel Induráin
- Clásica de Almería

==== 1.1 ====
- Trofeo Mallorca
- Trofeo Cala Millor-Cala Bona
- Trofeo Pollença
- Trofeo Soller
- Trofeo Calvià

Note: The above five single-day races together make up the Vuelta a Mallorca

- Klasika Primavera
- Vuelta a La Rioja (stage race until 2008)
- GP Llodio
- Subida al Naranco
- Prueba Villafranca de Ordizia - Clasica de Ordizia
- Circuito de Getxo "Memorial Ricardo Otxoa"
- Subida a Urkiola
- Clásica Ciclista los Puertos

==== 1.2 ====
- Escalada a Montjuïc
- Bilbao Klasika starting in 2007 (cancelled)
- GP Área Metropolitana
- GP Ciudade de Vigo

== Stage races ==
=== UCI World Tour ===
- Vuelta a España
- Tour of the Basque Country
- Volta a Catalunya

=== UCI Europe Tour ===
==== 2.Pro ====
- Vuelta a Andalucía, "Ruta del Sol"
- Vuelta a Burgos
- Volta a la Comunitat Valenciana

==== 2.1 ====
- Vuelta a Asturias
- Vuelta a la Comunidad de Madrid
- Vuelta a Castilla y León
- Vuelta a Murcia
- O Gran Camiño

==== 2.2 ====
As of 2020, there are currently no Spanish races in this category

==== Discontinued stage races ====
- Cinturón Ciclista a Mallorca
- Cinturo de l'Emporda
- Circuito Montañés
- Clásica Internacional a Alcobendas y Collado Villalba (discontinued after 2008)
- Euskal Bizikleta (last held in 2008 as a 2.HC event, and was merged with the Tour of the Basque Country in 2009).
- Setmana Catalana de Ciclisme (discontinued after 2005)
- Tour of Galicia (discontinued)
- Volta a Lleida (discontinued after 2008)
- Vuelta a Aragón (last held in 2019)
- Vuelta Ciclista a León
- Vuelta Ciclista a Navarra (discontinued after 2008)
- Vuelta Ciclista Internacional a Extremadura
