= 2026 Memorial Marco Pantani =

2026 UCI Europe Tour
- Race podium

Race details
- Dates: 12 September 2026
- Stages: 1
- Distance: 186.4 km (115.8 mi)
- Winning time: 4h 23' 43"

Results
	Winner	Ion Izagirre (ESP)	(Cofidis)
	Second	Giulio Pellizzari (ITA)	(Red Bull–Bora–Hansgrohe)
	Third	Mikkel Honoré (DEN)	(EF Education–EasyPost)

The 2026 Memorial Marco Pantani was the 23rd edition of the Memorial Marco Pantani road cycling one day race, which was held on 12 September 2026 as part of the 2026 UCI Europe Tour calendar. The race started in Riccione and finished, as usual, in Cesenatico.

== Teams ==
Nine UCI WorldTeams and thirteen UCI ProTeams made up the twenty-two teams that participated in the race.

UCI WorldTeams

- Team Bahrain Victorious
- EF Education–EasyPost
- Groupama–FDJ United
- Movistar Team
- Netcompany INEOS
- Red Bull–Bora–Hansgrohe
- Team Jayco–AlUla
- UAE Team Emirates XRG
- XDS Astana Team

UCI ProTeams

- Tudor Pro Cycling Team
- Uno-X Mobility
- Bardiani–CSF 7 Saber
- Burgos Burpellet BH
- Caja Rural–Seguros RGA
- Cofidis
- Equipo Kern Pharma
- Euskaltel–Euskadi
- MBH Bank CSB Telecom Fort
- Solution Tech NIPPO Rali
- Team Polti VisitMalta
- Team TotalEnergies
- Unibet Rose Rockets

== Results ==
Ion Izagirre crossing the finish line

Result
Rank	Rider	Team	Time
1	Ion Izagirre (ESP)	Cofidis	4h 23' 43"
2	Giulio Pellizzari (ITA)	Red Bull–Bora–Hansgrohe	s.t.
3	Mikkel Honoré (DEN)	EF Education–EasyPost	s.t.
4	Michael Storer (AUS)	Tudor Pro Cycling Team	s.t.
5	Markus Hoelgaard (NOR)	Uno-X Mobility	+ 23"
6	Jai Hindley (AUS)	Red Bull–Bora–Hansgrohe	s.t.
7	Joris Delbove (FRA)	Team TotalEnergies	s.t.
8	Antonio Tiberi (ITA)	Team Bahrain Victorious	s.t.
9	Mathys Rondel (FRA)	Tudor Pro Cycling Team	+ 25"
10	Dorian Godon (FRA)	Netcompany INEOS	+ 30"
