= 2026 Vuelta a Murcia =

Spanish multi-day road cycling race

2026 UCI Europe Tour

Race details
- Dates: 13–14 February 2026
- Stages: 2
- Distance: 89.3 km (55.49 mi)

The 2026 Vuelta a Murcia is the 46th edition of the Vuelta a Murcia road cycling race. It was held on 13 and 14 February 2026 in the Region of Murcia region of south-eastern Spain as a category 1.1 event on the 2026 UCI Europe Tour calendar.

Marc Soler was originally declared winner of the race but the UCI declined to ratify the result, as according to the rules the overall classification can only be awarded if both stages had been run. Marc Soler won stage 1 and that result stands.

== Teams ==
Six UCI WorldTeams, ten UCI ProTeams, two UCI Continental and one national team made up the nineteen teams that participated in the race.

UCI WorldTeams

- Lotto–Intermarché
- Movistar Team
- Soudal–Quick-Step
- Team Bahrain Victorious
- UAE Team Emirates XRG
- XDS Astana Team

UCI ProTeams

- Bardiani–CSF 7 Saber
- Burgos Burpellet BH
- Caja Rural–Seguros RGA
- Equipo Kern Pharma
- Euskaltel–Euskadi
- Modern Adventure Pro Cycling
- Pinarello–Q36.5 Pro Cycling Team
- Team Flanders–Baloise
- Team TotalEnergies
- Unibet Rose Rockets

UCI Continental Teams

- Lucky Sport Cycling Team
- Petrolike

National Teams

- Spain

== Results ==
=== Stage 1 ===
13 February 2026 — Fortuna to Yecla, 89.3 km (55.5 mi)

The stage was originally 178.5 kilometres (110.9 mi) and the original start was at Cartagena, but high winds caused the start to be moved to Fortuna.

Result and general classification after Stage 1
Rank	Rider	Team	Time
1	Marc Soler (ESP)	UAE Team Emirates XRG	1h 50′ 39″
2	Julius Johansen (DEN)	UAE Team Emirates XRG	+ 19"
3	Tom Pidcock (GBR)	Pinarello–Q36.5 Pro Cycling Team	+ 40"
4	Pello Bilbao (ESP)	Team Bahrain Victorious	+ 1' 01"
5	Igor Arrieta (ESP)	UAE Team Emirates XRG	+ 1' 01"
6	Tim Wellens (BEL)	UAE Team Emirates XRG	+ 1' 01"
7	Héctor Álvarez (ESP)	Spain	+ 1' 01"
8	Matej Mohorič (SLO)	Team Bahrain Victorious	+ 1' 01"
9	Matyáš Kopecký (CZE)	Unibet Rose Rockets	+ 1' 01"
10	Benoît Cosnefroy (FRA)	UAE Team Emirates XRG	+ 1' 15"

=== Stage 2 ===
14 February 2026 — Fortuna to Santomera, 10 km (6.2 mi)

The stage were neutralized after 23 kilometres of racing, and subsequently cancelled because of strong headwinds.
