= Cycling at the 2026 Mediterranean Games – Men's road race =

Men's cycling road race at the 2026 Mediterranean Games
- Venue: Itria Valley
- Date: 24 August
- Competitors: 51 from 18 nations
- Winning time: 2:59:52

Medalists
gold medal	Tommaso Dati	Italy
silver medal	Tiago Antunes	Portugal
bronze medal	Federico Iacomoni	Italy

The men's road race was one of 4 cycling events of the 2026 Mediterranean Games in Taranto. The race started and finished on 24 August at the Itria Valley and was won by Tommaso Dati of Italy.

== Schedule ==
All times are Central European Summer Time (UTC+02:00)

Date	Time	Event
Monday, 24 August 2026	13:00	Final

== Results ==
Legend

- DNF — Did not finish

Rank	Athlete	Time
1st place, gold medalist(s)	Tommaso Dati (ITA)	2:59:52
2nd place, silver medalist(s)	Tiago Antunes (POR)	2:59:52
3rd place, bronze medalist(s)	Federico Iacomoni (ITA)	2:59:53
4	Bogdan Zabelinskiy (CYP)	3:01:10
5	Andrea Mifsud (MLT)	3:01:26
6	José María García (ESP)	3:01:26
7	Pedro Silva (POR)	3:01:26
8	Burak Abay (TUR)	3:01:26
9	Manuel Peñalver (ESP)	3:03:02
10	Luca Giaimi (ITA)	3:03:02
11	Nikiforos Arvanitou (GRE)	3:03:02
12	Georgios Bouglas (GRE)	3:03:02
13	Matic Žumer (SLO)	3:03:02
14	Émilien Jacquelin (FRA)	3:03:04
15	Mirco Maestri (ITA)	3:03:07
16	Mihael Štajnar (SLO)	3:03:19
17	Estanislao Calabuig (ESP)	3:03:42
18	Hamza Amari (ALG)	3:04:43
19	Tilen Finkšt (SLO)	3:04:45
20	Mihajlo Stolić (SRB)	3:04:45
21	Afonso Silva (POR)	3:10:14
22	Rafael Reis (POR)	3:10:14
23	Ognjen Ilić (SRB)	3:10:14
24	Aidan Buttigieg (MLT)	3:10:14
25	Mohamed Aziz Dellai (TUN)	3:10:14
26	Andreas Miltiadis (CYP)	3:10:14
—	Gabriele De Fabritiis (ALB)	DNF
—	Valentino Kamberaj (ALB)	DNF
—	Lukas Sulaj Kloppenborg (ALB)	DNF
—	Leo Piku (ALB)	DNF
—	Mohamed-Nadjib Assal (ALG)	DNF
—	Yacine Hamza (ALG)	DNF
—	Anes Riahi (ALG)	DNF
—	Anes Ćehajić (BIH)	DNF
—	Vedad Karić (BIH)	DNF
—	Christodoulos Achas (CYP)	DNF
—	Albion Kastrati (KOS)	DNF
—	Blerton Nuha (KOS)	DNF
—	Visar Nuhaj (KOS)	DNF
—	Bernard Galea (MLT)	DNF
—	Stefan Petrovski (MKD)	DNF
—	Andrea Chiarucci (SMR)	DNF
—	Anže Skok (SLO)	DNF
—	Marco Martín (ESP)	DNF
—	Emiliano Morbidelli (VAT)	DNF
—	Nadhem Ben Amar (TUN)	DNF
—	Hatem Ben Ameur (TUN)	DNF
—	Karim Mohamed Mliki (TUN)	DNF
—	Ahmet Örken (TUR)	DNF
—	Mustafa Tarakcı (TUR)	DNF
—	Ramazan Yılmaz (TUR)	DNF
