= Riccardo Lucca =

Italian cyclist (born 1997)

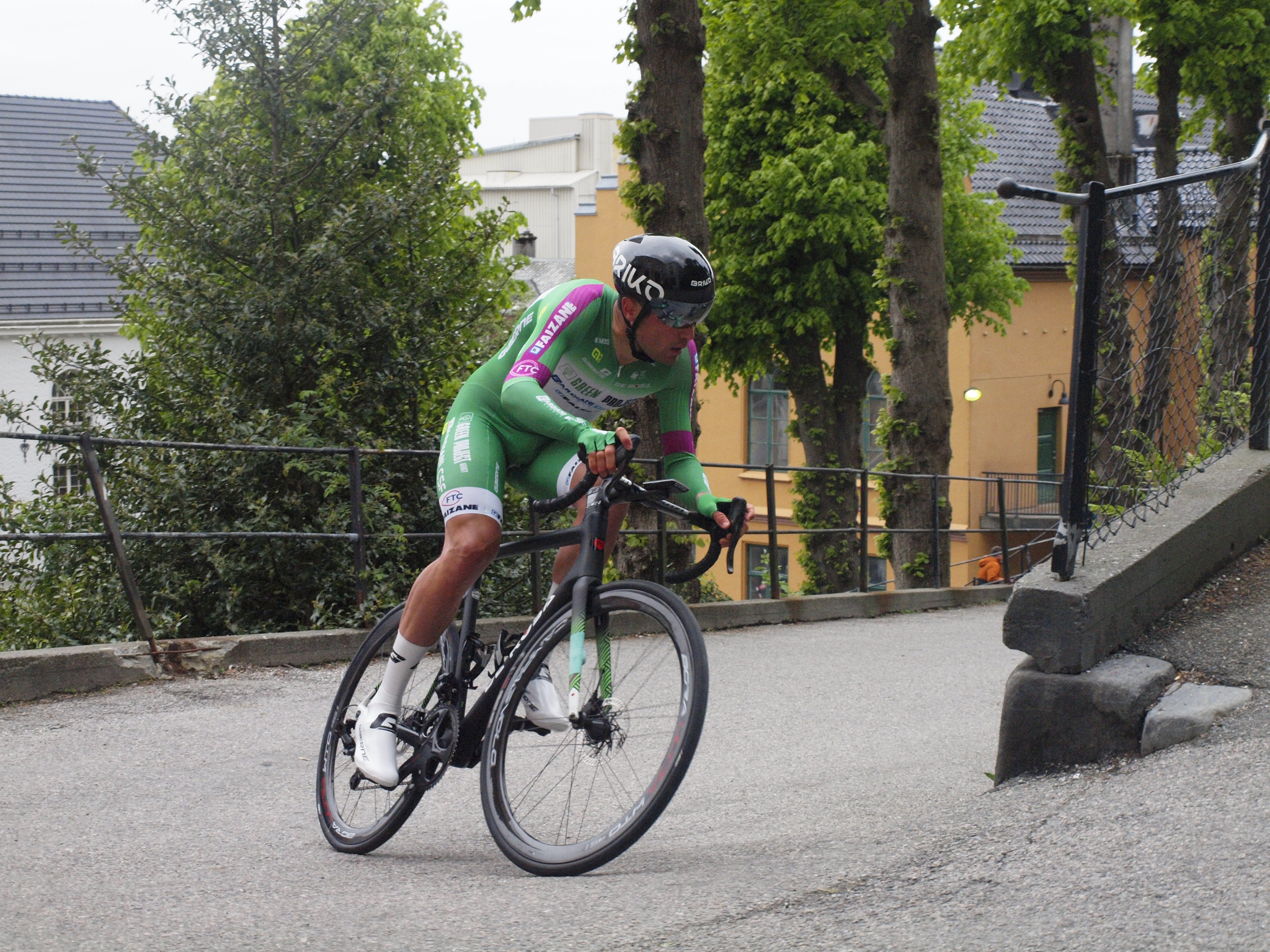
- Lucca at the 2023 Tour of Norway

Personal information
- Born: 24 February 1997 (age 29) Rovereto, Italy
- Height: 1.84 m (6 ft 0 in)
- Weight: 74 kg (163 lb)

Cycling career
- Sport: Cycling
- Discipline: Road
- Role: Rider
- Rider type: Climber

Amateur teams
- 2010–2013: Forti e Veloci
- 2014–2015: US Ausonia CSI Pescantina
- 2016–2017: Zalf–Euromobil–Désirée–Fior
- 2018: Team Colpack
- 2019: Work Service–Videa–Coppi Gazzera

Professional teams
- 2020–2021: General Store–Essegibi–Fratelli Curia
- 2021: Gazprom–RusVelo (stagiaire)
- 2022: Work Service–Vitalcare–Vega
- 2023–2024: Green Project–Bardiani–CSF–Faizanè

Riccardo Lucca (born 24 February 1997) is an Italian racing cyclist, who last rode for UCI ProTeam VF Group–Bardiani–CSF–Faizanè.

== Major results ==
2014
3rd Time trial, National Junior Road Championships
2015
2nd Overall Giro della Lunigiana
2019
7th Giro del Medio Brenta
2021
1st Trofeo Alcide Degasperi
1st Coppa Città di San Daniele
2022
1st Stage 4 Adriatica Ionica Race
7th Overall Giro della Friuli Venezia Giulia

1st Stage 3

7th Trofeo Alcide Degasperi
