= GP Capodarco =

Italian cycling race

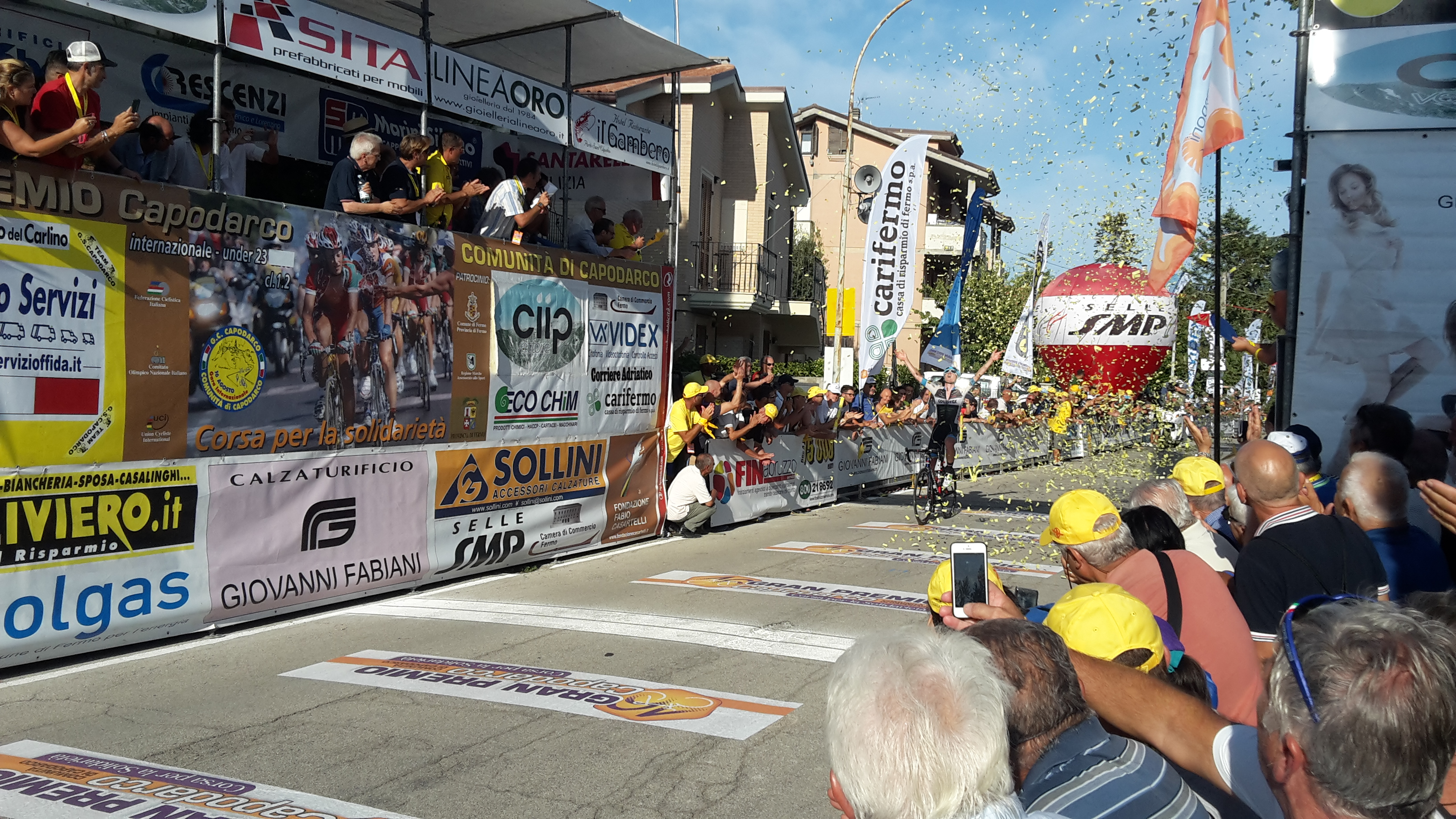

Race details
- Date: August
- Region: Italy
- Discipline: Road
- Competition: UCI Europe Tour
- Type: Single-day
- Web site: www.gpcapodarco.net

History
- First edition: 1964
- Editions: 54 (as of 2026)
- First winner: Stefanelli (ITA)
- Most wins: Tedeschi (ITA); Cortinovis (ITA); Moisés Aldape (MEX) (2 wins)
- Most recent: Jan Jackowiak (POL)

The GP Capodarco is a European bicycle race held in Capodarco, a city ward of Fermo, Italy. Since 2005, the race has been organised as a 1.2 event on the UCI Europe Tour.

== Winners ==
Year	Country	Rider	Team
1964	Italy	Marcello Baccarini	Sammontana Faenza
1965- 1972	No race		
1973	Italy	Massimo Zani	U.S. Trezzano
1974	Italy	Massimo Tedeschi	G.S. Sarila
1975	Italy	Massimo Tedeschi	G.S. Sarila
1976	Italy	Franco Abbruzzetti	G.C. Porto S. Elpidio
1977	Italy	Maurizio Pennacchini	G.S. Muraglia PRE.FAB
1978	Italy	Pierino Bravi	U.S. Europlastica
1979	Italy	Giancarlo Montedori	CIERRE Montone
1980	Italy	Giuseppe Di Sciorio	U.S. Europlastica
1981	Italy	Piero Onesti	G.S. Adriatica Arr.ti Odoardi
1982	Italy	Tullio Cortinovis	G.S. Novartiplast
1983	Italy	Salvatore Cavallaro	U.S. Fracor Levane
1984	Italy	Tullio Cortinovis	G.S. Brescialat Novartiplast
1985	Italy	Nino Tripodi	G.S. Ariston Di Monte TV Color
1986	Italy	Marcello Siboni	G.S. Alexander Gobbi Frutta
1987	Italy	Mario Austero	SICC Cucine Componibili
1988	Italy	Paolo Lanfranchi	G.S. Bresciaplast Remac
1989	Italy	Davide Bramati	G.S. Brescialat Verynet
1990	Italy	Wladimir Belli	G.S. Diana Calzature
1991	Italy	Fabio Casartelli	G.S. Domus '87 Plant Group
1992	Italy	Marco Milesi	G.S. Domus '87
1993	Italy	Roberto Pistore	G.S. Esoclear
1994	Spain	Juan Carlos Domínguez	Spain (National Team)
1995	Italy	Paolo Valoti	G.M.G. Paultex Vellutex
1996	Italy	Gianluca Valoti	Team Polti
1997	Italy	Massimo Codol	S.C. Ceramiche Pagnoncelli
1998	Italy	Giorgio Feliziani	S.C. Centri della Calzatura
1999	Czech Republic	Milan Kadlec	G.S. Brunero Bongioanni Boeris
2000	Italy	Massimiliano Martella	Team Olio Vezza Brunero
2001	Italy	Alessandro Delfatti	V.C. Sintofarm Feralpi
2002	Italy	Antonio Quadranti	V.C. Sintofarm Feralpi
2003	Mexico	Moises Aldape	Centri Calzatura-Riviera Adriatica A.S.T
2004	Mexico	Moises Aldape	Centri Calzatura
2005	Spain	Fernando Herrero	Vina-Magna Cropu Burgos
2006	Italy	Marco Bandiera	Zalf–Désirée–Fior
2007	Croatia	Hrvoje Miholjević	Loborika
2008	Great Britain	Peter Kennaugh	Great Britain (National Team)
2009	Italy	Salvatore Mancuso	Lucchini-Arvedi-Unidelta
2010	Italy	Enrico Battaglin	Italy (National Team)
2011	Italy	Mattia Cattaneo	U.C. Trevigiani–Dynamon–Bottoli
2012	Italy	Gianfranco Zilioli	Team Colpack
2013	Italy	Matteo Busato	U.C. Trevigiani–Dynamon–Bottoli
2014	Australia	Robert Power	Jayco–AIS World Tour Academy
2015	Italy	Riccardo Donato	Selle Italia-Cieffe-Ursus
2016	Australia	Jai Hindley	Jayco–AIS World Tour Academy
2017	Ukraine	Mark Padun	Team Colpack
2018	Colombia	Einer Rubio	Vejus-Tmf
2019	Italy	Filippo Zana	Sangemini–Trevigiani–MG.K Vis
2020	No race		
2021	Italy	Simone Raccani	Zalf Euromobil Fior
2022	Italy	Nicolò Buratti	Cycling Team Friuli ASD
2023	Italy	Matteo Ambrosini	Team Colpack–Ballan–CSB
2024	Italy	Filippo D'Aiuto	General Store–Essegibi–Fratelli Curia
2025	Slovenia	Jakob Omrzel	Bahrain Victorious Development Team
2026	Poland	Jan Jackowiak	Bahrain Victorious Development Team
