= Riccardo Donato =

Italian cyclist

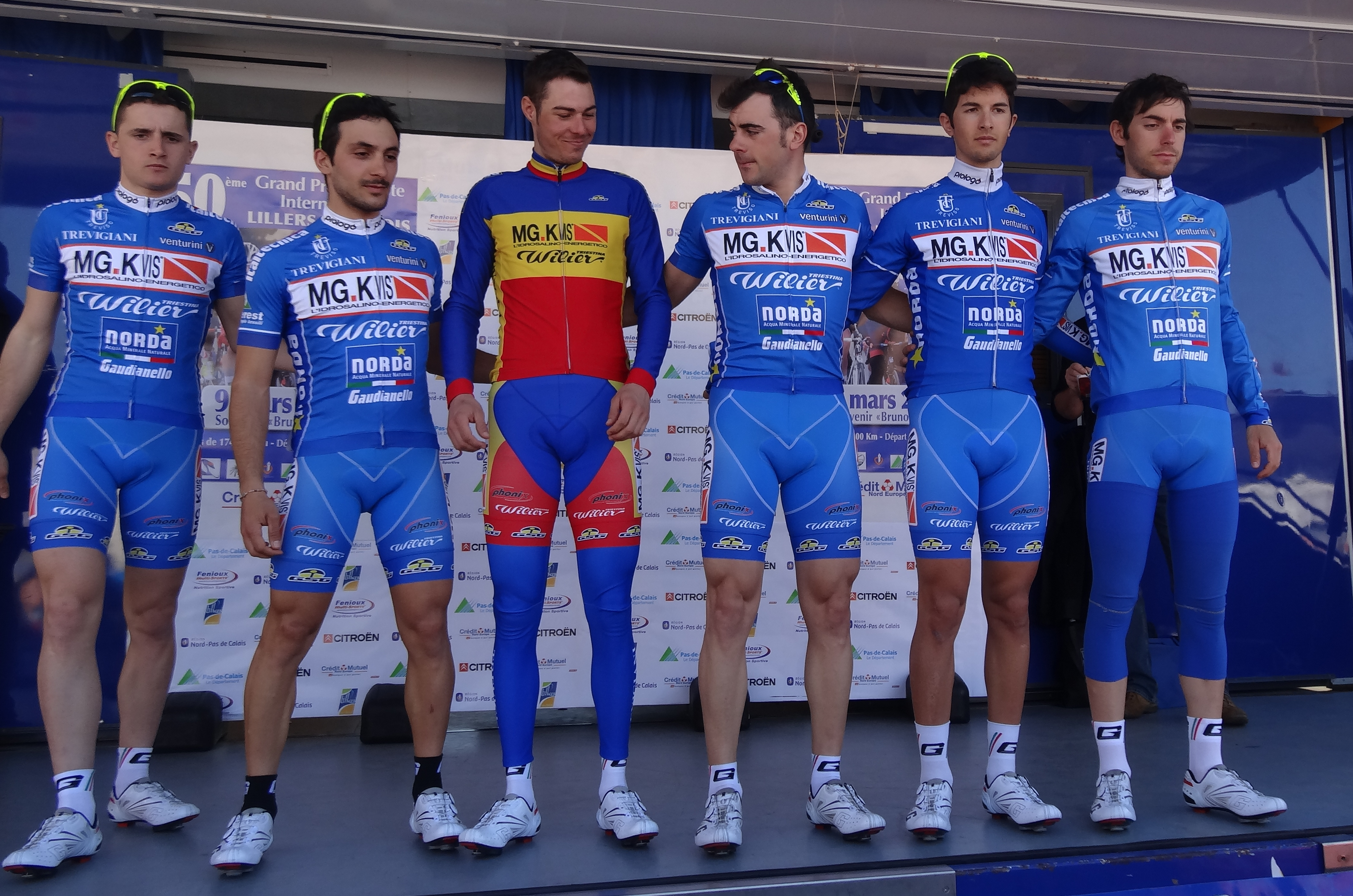
- Riccardo Donato (2nd from the right) in 2014

Personal information
- Born: 2 February 1994 (age 32) Italy

Cycling career
- Sport: Cycling
- Role: Rider

Riccardo Donato (born 2 February 1994) is an Italian racing cyclist. He rode at the 2014 UCI Road World Championships. The following year, he won the GP Capodarco.
