= 2026 Circuito de Getxo =

2026 UCI Europe Tour

Race details
- Dates: 2 August 2026
- Stages: 1
- Distance: 172.2 km (107.0 mi)
- Winning time: 3h 58' 49"

Results
	Winner	Natnael Tesfatsion (ERI)	(Movistar Team)
	Second	Pau Miquel (ESP)	(Team Bahrain Victorious)
	Third	Alex Aranburu (ESP)	(Cofidis)

The 2026 Circuito de Getxo or 81. Circuito de Getxo - Memorial Hermanos Otxoa is the 81st edition of the Circuito de Getxo one-day road cycling race. It was held on 2 August 2026 as a category 1.1 race on the 2026 UCI Europe Tour.

== Teams ==
Four UCI WorldTeams, nine UCI ProTeams and three UCI Continental Teams made up the sixteen teams that participated in the race.

UCI WorldTeams

- Team Bahrain Victorious
- Lidl–Trek
- Movistar Team
- UAE Team Emirates XRG

UCI ProTeams

- Burgos Burpellet BH
- Caja Rural–Seguros RGA
- Cofidis
- Equipo Kern Pharma
- Euskaltel–Euskadi
- Pinarello–Q36.5 Pro Cycling Team
- Team Polti VisitMalta
- Team TotalEnergies
- Unibet Rose Rockets

UCI Continental Teams

- APS Pro Cycling by Team Cadence Cyclery
- Meridian Racing p/b de la Uz
- Victoria Sports Pro Cycling

== Result ==
Result (1–10)
Rank	Rider	Team	Time
1	Natnael Tesfatsion (ERI)	Movistar Team	3h 58' 49"
2	Pau Miquel (ESP)	Team Bahrain Victorious	+ 0"
3	Alex Aranburu (ESP)	Cofidis	+ 0"
4	Marcel Camprubí (ESP)	Pinarello–Q36.5 Pro Cycling Team	+ 0"
5	Ludovico Crescioli (ITA)	Team Polti VisitMalta	+ 0"
6	Giulio Ciccone (ITA)	Lidl–Trek	+ 0"
7	Jordi López (ESP)	Euskaltel–Euskadi	+ 0"
8	Mathieu Burgaudeau (FRA)	Team TotalEnergies	+ 0"
9	César Pérez (ESP)	Equipo Kern Pharma	+ 4"
10	Dario Giuliano (FRA)	Team Polti VisitMalta	+ 8"
