= Oliver Stockwell =

British cyclist

Personal information
- Born: 7 June 2002 (age 24) Welwyn Garden City, England
- Height: 1.82 m (6 ft 0 in)

Cycling career
- Sport: Cycling
- Current team: Team Bahrain Victorious
- Discipline: Road
- Role: Rider

Amateur teams
- 2019: Ribble Pro Cycling U19
- 2020: Flamme Rouge
- 2021: GB Cycling Senior Academy

Professional teams
- 2022–2024: Cycling Team Friuli ASD
- 2025–: Team Bahrain Victorious

Oliver Stockwell (born 7 June 2002) is a British professional road racing cyclist who rides for UCI WorldTeam Team Bahrain Victorious. He was British junior champion in 2019.

== Career ==
From Welwyn Garden City, he raced cyclo-cross as well as on the road when he was young. In 2018, he won the British U16 boys national circuit championships. In 2019, he won the British Junior Road Race Championships at Bassingham in Lincolnshire on 28 July.

He raced on the GB Squad for the Tour de l'Avenir in August 2021. The following month he competed in the Tour of Britain.

He competed for Britain in the U23 road race at the UCI Road World Championships in 2022. In February 2023, he suffered a bad crash training in Italy which saw him receive multiple fractures to his right femur, and required surgery.

Riding for UCI Continental team CTF Victorious in 2024, he finished fifth in the Ronde de l'Isard. In September 2024, he was selected to ride for Britain in the UCI U23 World Road Race Championships in Zurich, Switzerland.

He signed a two year contract to ride for Team Bahrain Victorious from the 2025 season.

== Major results ==
=== Road ===
2019
1st Stage 1 (TTT) Sint-Martinusprijs Kontich
8th Overall Keizer der Juniores
2020
8th Overall La Philippe Gilbert Juniors
2022
1st Stage 1 (TTT) Giro della Regione Friuli Venezia Giulia
2nd GP Slovenian Istria
6th GP Czech Republic, Visegrad 4 Bicycle Race
8th Overall Giro della Valle d'Aosta
9th GP Vipava Valley & Crossborder Goriška
10th Overall Adriatica Ionica Race
10th Overall Carpathian Couriers Race
2024
5th Overall Ronde de l'Isard

=== Cyclo-cross ===
2019–2020
2nd National Junior Championships
Junior National Trophy Series

2nd Milnthorpe
2nd York
