= Alessandro Pinarello =

Italian cyclist

Personal information
- Born: 12 July 2003 (age 23) Conegliano, Italy

Cycling career
- Sport: Cycling
- Current team: NSN Cycling Team
- Discipline: Road
- Role: Rider

Amateur team
- 2020–2021: Borgo Molino Rinascita Ormelle

Professional teams
- 2022–2025: Bardiani–CSF–Faizanè
- 2026–: NSN Cycling Team

Alessandro Pinarello (born 12 July 2003) is an Italian racing cyclist, who currently rides for UCI WorldTeam NSN Cycling Team.

== Major results ==
2021
1st Trofeo Buffoni
1st Circuito delle Conche
3rd Overall Giro della Lunigiana
5th Trofeo Guido Dorigo
2022
7th Il Piccolo Lombardia
6th Giro del Belvedere
10th Gran Premio Industrie del Marmo
10th Gran Premio della Liberazione
2023
3rd G.P. Palio del Recioto
3rd Gran Premio della Liberazione
6th Overall Tour Alsace
6th Trofeo Città di San Vendemiano
6th Trofeo Piva
10th Overall Carpathian Couriers Race
2024
1st G.P. Palio del Recioto
2nd Overall Tour of Antalya
2nd Trofeo Piva
3rd Ruota d'Oro
4th Giro del Belvedere
7th Coppa Bernocchi
9th Overall Giro Next Gen
2025
4th Giro della Toscana
8th Clàssica Comunitat Valenciana 1969
9th Overall Settimana Internazionale di Coppi e Bartali
2026 (1 pro win)
3rd Overall O Gran Camiño

1st Points classification
1st Mountains classification
1st Stage 5

3rd Overall Arctic Race of Norway
9th Grand Prix Cycliste de Québec
10th Overall Tirreno–Adriatico

=== Grand Tour general classification results timeline ===
| Grand Tour | 2025 |
|---|---|
| Giro d'Italia | DNF |
| Tour de France | |
| Vuelta a España | |
