= Tommaso Dati =

Italian bicycle racer

Personal information
- Born: 13 July 2002 (age 24) Camaiore, Italy

Cycling career
- Sport: Cycling
- Current team: Team UKYO
- Discipline: Road
- Role: Rider

Amateur teams
- 2019–2020: GS Stabbia Ciclismo
- 2021–2022: Maltinti Lampadari–Banca Cambiano
- 2023: Mastromarco Sensi Nibali

Professional teams
- 2024–2025: Biesse–Carrera
- 2025: Cofidis (stagiaire)
- 2026–: Team UKYO
Medal record
Representing Italy
Men's road cycling
Mediterranean Games
Gold medal – first place	2026 Taranto	Road race

Tommaso Dati (born 13 July 2002) is an Italian cyclist, who currently rides for UCI Continental team Team UKYO.

== Career ==
Dati took his first pro win in March 2026 on stage three of the Settimana Internazionale di Coppi e Bartali, finishing ahead of Mauro Schmid. The following month, he outpsrinted Tom Pidcock in an upset victory on the first stage of the Tour of the Alps.

== Major results ==
2019
1st Coppa Giulio Burci
2022
6th Coppa Zappi
2024
1st Gran Premio Industrie del Marmo
2025
1st Trofeo Città di Castelfidardo
1st Coppa Varignana
1st Memorial Daniele Tortoli
1st Firenze-Viareggio
1st Trofeo Città di San Giovanni Valdarno
4th Gran Premio Santa Rita
6th Radsportfest Märwil
2026 (2 pro wins)
1st Road race, Mediterranean Games
1st Overall Tour de Gyeongnam
Tour of Japan

1st Points classification
1st Stage 1, 2 & 5

Tour of the Alps

1st Points classification
1st Stage 1

1st Stage 3 Settimana Internazionale di Coppi e Bartali
2nd Road race, National Road Championships
2nd Coppa Bernocchi
4th Overall Giro della Regione Friuli Venezia Giulia

1st Points classification
1st Stage 3
