= Nicolò Arrighetti =

Italian natural philosopher (1709–1767)

- Born: 17 March 1709; Florence, Italy
- Died: 31 January 1767 (aged 57)
- Known for: Theories of light, heat and electricity
- Scientific career
- Workplaces: Spoleto, Prato, Siena

Nicolò Arrighetti (17 March 1709 – 31 January 1767) was an Italian professor of natural philosophy. He was born in Florence, Italy in 1709. On 21 October 1724, he became a member of the Society of Jesus; he taught natural philosophy in Spoleto, Prato and Siena. He died in 1767.

His surviving works include treatises on theories of light, heat and electricity and on the causes of the movement of mercury in barometers.

== See also ==
- List of Roman Catholic scientist-clerics
