= Trofeo Alcide De Gasperi =

Italian one-day road cycling race

Race details
- Date: June
- Region: Italy
- Discipline: Road race
- Competition: UCI Europe Tour
- Type: Single day race
- Race director: Roberto Corradini

History
- First edition: 1955
- Editions: 70 (as of 2026)
- First winner: Marino Fontana (ITA)
- Most wins: Walter Magnago (ITA) (2 wins)
- Most recent: Filippo D'Aiuto (ITA)

The Trofeo Alcide De Gasperi is a one-day cycling race held annually in Italy. It was part of the UCI Europe Tour in category 1.2 from 2005 to 2015, when it was reserved for amateurs in 2016. It returned to the UCI Europe Tour in 2017.

== Winners ==
Year	Winner	Second	Third
1955	(Italy) Marino Fontana		
1956	(Italy) Marcello Zampredi		
1957	(Italy) Nunzio Pellicciari		
1958	(Italy) Avis Molinari		
1959	(Italy) Rino Luise		
1960	(Italy) Luigi Zanchetta		
1961	(Italy) Enzo Moser		
1962	(Italy) Silvano Consolati		
1963	(Italy) Lauro Grazioli		
1964	(Italy) Aldo Balasso		
1965	(Italy) Mino Denti		
1966	(Italy) Davide Boifava		
1967	(Italy) Romano Tumellero		
1968	(Italy) Flavio Martini		
1969	(Italy) Vittorio Cumino		
1970	(Italy) Ermenegildo Da Re		
1971	(Italy) Giovanni Varini	(Italy) Flavio Vencato	(Italy) Enzo Brentegani
1972	(Italy) Giancarlo Ferretti		
1973	(Italy) Giampaolo Flamini		
1974	(Italy) Glauco Santoni		
1975	(Italy) Pierluigi Fabbri		
1976	(Italy) Gabriele Landoni		
1977	(Italy) Claudio Corti		
1978	(Italy) Giorgio Zanotti		
1979	(Belgium) Guy Nulens		
1980	(Italy) Walter Magnago		
1981	(Italy) Antonio Leali		
1982	(Italy) Giovanni Viere		
1983	(Italy) Walter Magnago		
1984	(Italy) Domenico Cavallo		
1985	(Socialist Federal Republic of Yugoslavia) Primož Čerin		
1986	(Italy) Moravio Pianegonda		
1987	(Austria) Helmut Wechselberger		
1988	(Italy) Luigi Bielli		
1989	(Italy) Franco Rossato		
1990	(Italy) Mirko Gualdi		
1991	(Italy) Gilberto Simoni		
1992	(Italy) Davide Rebellin		
1993	(Italy) Marco Foligno		
1994	(Italy) Flavio Milan		
1995	(Italy) Paolo Savoldelli		
1996	(Italy) Davide Montanari		
1997	(Italy) Matteo Panzeri		
1998	(Italy) Devis Miorin		
1999	(Ukraine) Volodymir Gustov		
2000	(Russia) Dmitry Gaynitdinov		
2001	(Italy) Mario Pafundi		
2002	(Italy) Andrea Sanvido	(Russia) Vladimir Gusev	(Italy) Paolo Longo Borghini
2003	(Italy) Emanuele Sella	(Russia) Aleksandr Baženov	(Ukraine) Denys Kostjuk
2004	(Italy) Daniele Colli	(Italy) Elia Rigotto	(Ukraine) Andrij Pryščepa
2005	(Italy) David Garbelli	(Italy) Marco Bandiera	(Italy) Luca Gasparini
2006	(Australia) Matthew Lloyd	(Russia) Alexander Filippov	(Italy) Davide Malacarne
2007	(Italy) Jacopo Guarnieri	(Italy) Manuel Belletti	(Italy) Cristiano Fumagalli
2008	(Poland) Jarosław Marycz	(Australia) Simon Clarke	(Russia) Pavel Kochetkov
2009	(Russia) Pavel Kochetkov	(Italy) Manuele Boaro	(Russia) Egor Silin
2010	(Italy) Sonny Colbrelli	(Italy) Matteo Trentin	(Italy) Marco Canola
2011	(Italy) Matteo Trentin	(Italy) Moreno Moser	(Italy) Alberto Cecchin
2012	(Italy) Enrico Barbin	(Australia) Rohan Dennis	(Italy) Davide Villella
2013	(Australia) Damien Howson	(Italy) Gianluca Leonardi	(Italy) Gianluca Milani
2014	(Italy) Michele Gazzara	(Belarus) Ilia Koshevoy	(Italy) Paolo Brundo
2015	(Italy) Alberto Cecchin	(Italy) Lorenzo Rota	(Italy) Davide Ballerini
2016	(Italy) Filippo Rocchetti	(Italy) Fausto Masnada	(Italy) Andrea Marchi
2017	(Italy) Andrea Toniatti	(Belarus) Alexandr Riabushenko	(Italy) Nicolò Rocchi
2018	(Italy) Simone Ravanelli	(South Africa) Stefan de Bod	(Italy) Andrea Pietrobon
2019	(Australia) Benjamin Hill	(Italy) Marco Frigo	(New Zealand) Connor Brown
2020	No race due to the COVID-19 pandemic		
2021	(Italy) Riccardo Lucca	(Italy) Riccardo Verza	(Germany) Jon Knolle
2022	(Germany) Pierre-Pascal Keup	(Belgium) Luca Van Boven	(Denmark) Anders Foldager
2023	(Italy) Davide De Pretto	(Italy) Sergio Meris	(Italy) Michael Belleri
2024	No race		
2025	(Ukraine) Kyrylo Tsarenko	(Germany) Lennart Jasch	(Italy) Luca Cretti
2026	(Italy) Filippo D'Aiuto	(Colombia) Santiago Umba	(Italy) Lorenzo Conforti
