= Patryk Goszczurny =

Polish cyclist

Personal information
- Born: 14 March 2006 (age 20) Kalisz, Poland
- Height: 1.81 m (5 ft 11 in)

Cycling career
- Sport: Cycling
- Current team: Visma–Lease a Bike Development
- Discipline: Road
- Role: Rider

Amateur team
- 2023–2024: JEGG-DJR Academy

Professional team
- 2025–: Visma–Lease a Bike Development
Medal record
Representing Poland
Men's road bicycle racing
European Youth Summer Olympic Festival
| Gold medal – first place | 2022 Banská Bystrica | Boys' TT |
| Silver medal – second place | 2022 Banská Bystrica | Boys' road race |

Patryk Goszczurny (born 14 March 2006) is a Polish professional racing cyclist, who rides for UCI Continental team Visma–Lease a Bike Development.

== Major results ==
2023
National Junior Road Championships

2nd Road race
7th Time trial

2nd Overall Acht van Bladel

1st Young rider classification

5th Overall Giro della Lunigiana
8th Overall Watersley Junior Challenge
8th Overall La Philippe Gilbert juniors
2024
National Junior Road Championships

2nd Time trial
3rd Road race

4th Overall Giro della Lunigiana
5th Overall Tour du Bocage et de l'Ernée 53
6th Overall La Philippe Gilbert juniors
9th Overall Trophée Centre Morbihan
9th Overall Aubel-Thimister-Stavelot
2025
National Under-23 Road Championships

2nd Time trial
8th Road race

2026
National Under-23 Road Championships

1st Time trial
3rd Road race

3rd GP Vorarlberg
7th G.P. Palio del Recioto
10th Flèche Ardennaise
