= Settimana Internazionale di Coppi e Bartali =

Italian multi-day road cycling race

Settimana Ciclistica Internazionale di Coppi e Bartali
Race details
- Date: Late March
- Region: Emilia-Romagna, Italy
- English name: International Week of Coppi and Bartali
- Local name: Settimana Internazionale di Coppi e Bartali (in Italian)
- Discipline: Road
- Type: Stage race
- Organiser: Gruppo Sportivo Emilia
- Web site: www.gsemilia.it

History
- First edition: 1984; 42 years ago
- Editions: 41 (as of 2026)
- First winner: Moreno Argentin (ITA)
- Most wins: Moreno Argentin (ITA); Damiano Cunego (ITA) (2 wins)
- Most recent: Mauro Schmid (SUI)

The Settimana Internazionale di Coppi e Bartali (English: International Week of Coppi and Bartali), also known as Coppi e Bartali, is an Italian cycle road race. It is run typically in late March over five days in the Emilia-Romagna region of Italy.

== History ==
Between 1999 and 2000 it was called Memorial Cecchi Gori while it was also previously held as Giro di Sardegna and Giro di Sicilia. The race is named after Italian cyclists Gino Bartali and Fausto Coppi. Since 2005, the race has been organised as a 2.1 event on the UCI Europe Tour. It is considered one of the most important stage races in Italy and is organized by Gruppo Sportivo Emilia.

In 2004 the organization of the race retired the number 145, worn by Marco Pantani in 2003 when he placed tenth and finished second in one stage after Ruslan Ivanov, allowing him to stand on the podium for the last time in his life. At the start of the race a flock of white doves was also released to remember him.

In 2009 at the 24th edition of the race, Damiano Cunego was the overall victor after two stage wins and a second place on the last day. Damiano Cunego won by 24 seconds over Cadel Evans in 2nd place and by 38 seconds over Massimo Giunti in 3rd place. Both Damiano Cunego and Cadel Evans said this was an important part of their training lead up to both Giro d'Italia 2009 for Cunego and Tour de France 2009 for Cadel Evans.

== List of winners ==
Year	Country	Rider	Team
1984	Italy	Moreno Argentin	Sammontana
1985	France	Laurent Fignon	Renault–Elf
1986	Italy	Giuseppe Saronni	Del Tongo
1987	Italy	Maurizio Rossi	Ecoflam–BFB Bruciatori–Mareco–Alfa Lum
1988	Italy	Adriano Baffi	GIS–Ecoflam–Jolly
1989	Italy	Bruno Leali	Gewiss–Bianchi
1990	Denmark	Rolf Sørensen	Ariostea
1991	Australia	Phil Anderson	Motorola
1992	Italy	Moreno Argentin	Ariostea
1993	Italy	Michele Bartoli	Mercatone Uno–Zucchini–Medeghini
1994	Italy	Rodolfo Massi	Amore & Vita–Galatron
1995	No race		
1996	Italy	Gabriele Colombo	Gewiss Playbus
1997	Italy	Roberto Petito	Saeco–Estro
1998	No race		
1999	Latvia	Romāns Vainšteins	Vini Caldirola
2000	Italy	Paolo Bettini	Mapei–Quick-Step
2001	Moldova	Ruslan Ivanov	Alessio
2002	Italy	Francesco Casagrande	Fassa Bortolo
2003	Italy	Mirko Celestino	Saeco
2004	Italy	Giuliano Figueras	Ceramica Panaria–Margres
2005	Italy	Franco Pellizotti	Liquigas–Bianchi
2006	Italy	Damiano Cunego	Lampre–Fondital
2007	Italy	Michele Scarponi	Acqua & Sapone–Caffè Mokambo
2008	Australia	Cadel Evans	Silence–Lotto
2009	Italy	Damiano Cunego	Lampre–NGC
2010	Italy	Ivan Santaromita	Liquigas–Doimo
2011	Italy	Emanuele Sella	Androni Giocattoli
2012	Czech Republic	Jan Bárta	Team NetApp
2013	Italy	Diego Ulissi	Lampre–Merida
2014	Great Britain	Peter Kennaugh	Team Sky
2015	South Africa	Louis Meintjes	MTN–Qhubeka
2016	Russia	Sergey Firsanov	Gazprom–RusVelo
2017	France	Lilian Calmejane	Direct Énergie
2018	Italy	Diego Rosa	Team Sky
2019	Australia	Lucas Hamilton	Mitchelton–Scott
2020	Ecuador	Jhonatan Narváez	Ineos Grenadiers
2021	Denmark	Jonas Vingegaard	Team Jumbo–Visma
2022	Ireland	Eddie Dunbar	Ineos Grenadiers
2023	Switzerland	Mauro Schmid	Soudal–Quick-Step
2024	Netherlands	Koen Bouwman	Visma–Lease a Bike
2025	Great Britain	Ben Tulett	Visma–Lease a Bike
2026	Switzerland	Mauro Schmid	Team Jayco–AlUla
