= O Gran Camiño =

Spanish cycling race

Race details
- Date: Late February
- Region: Galicia
- Discipline: Road
- Competition: UCI Europe Tour
- Type: Stage race
- Organiser: EmeSports
- Web site: ograncamino.gal

History
- First edition: 2022
- Editions: 5 (as of 2026)
- First winner: Alejandro Valverde (ESP)
- Most wins: Jonas Vingegaard (DEN) (2 wins)
- Most recent: Adam Yates (GBR)

O Gran Camiño (English: The Great Way), also known as Gran Camiño and the International Galician Tour, is a road cycling stage race held in the autonomous community of Galicia in northwestern Spain. The race is rated as a category 2.1 event on the UCI Europe Tour calendar.

The race returns regular professional cycling to Galicia for the first time since the Tour of Galicia, which was last held as a professional event in 2000; however, the two events are not related. The inaugural edition of the event took place in late February 2022 and consisted of four stages.

The name of the race draws inspiration from the Camino de Santiago pilgrimage to the cathedral of Santiago de Compostela in Galicia.

== Winners ==
Year	Country	Rider	Team
2022	Spain	Alejandro Valverde	Movistar Team
2023	Denmark	Jonas Vingegaard	Team Jumbo–Visma
2024	Denmark	Jonas Vingegaard	Visma–Lease a Bike
2025	Canada	Derek Gee	Israel–Premier Tech
2026	Great Britain	Adam Yates	UAE Team Emirates XRG
