= General Store–Fratelli Curia–Essegibi =

Italian cycling team

Team information
- UCI code: GEF
- Registered: Italy
- Founded: 1998
- Discipline: Road
- Status: National (1998–2019); UCI Continental (2020–)

Key personnel
- General manager: Alessandro Spiniella
- Team manager: Giorgio Furlan

Team name history
- 1998–2002 2003–2005 2006 2007 2008 2009 2014–2019 2020 2021–: San Pellegrino–Bottoli–Artoni; G.S. Bottoli–Artoni; Team Filmop; Filmop Ramonda Parolin; Filmop Sorelle Ramonda Bottoli; Bottoli Nordelettrica Ramonda; General Store Bottoli Zardini; General Store–Essegibi–Fratelli Curia; General Store–Fratelli Curia–Essegibi

General Store–Fratelli Curia–Essegibi (UCI team code: GEF) is an Italian UCI Continental cycling team founded in 1998. The team competed domestically from 1998 through 2019, and gained UCI status in 2020.

== Team roster ==
As of 10 February 2021.

Rider	Date of birth
Nicholas Agostini (ITA)	1 September 2000 (age 26)
Matteo Baseggio (ITA)	18 June 1998 (age 28)
Samuele Carpene (ITA)	31 March 2000 (age 26)
Dominik Górak (POL)	12 October 2001 (age 24)
Riccardo Lucca (ITA)	24 February 1997 (age 29)
Davide Martini (ITA)	27 May 2000 (age 26)
Jacopo Menegotto (ITA)	26 July 2000 (age 26)
Gianluca Mignolli (ITA)	24 June 2000 (age 26)

Rider	Date of birth
Marco Palomba (ITA)	5 May 2002 (age 24)
Ettore Pozza (ITA)	16 July 1999 (age 27)
Cristian Rocchetta (ITA)	2 March 1998 (age 28)
Ricardo Tosin (ITA)	21 January 1998 (age 28)
Davide Vignato (ITA)	24 August 2000 (age 26)
Lorenzo Visintainer (ITA)	29 July 1999 (age 27)
Abderrahim Zahiri (MAR)	1 January 1996 (age 30)
