= 2024 Tour of Antalya =

2024 UCI Europe Tour

Race details
- Dates: 8–11 February 2024
- Stages: 4
- Distance: 592.8 km (368.3 mi)
- Winning time: 14h 09' 38"

Results
Jersey awarded to the overall winner	Winner	Davide Piganzoli (ITA)	(Polti–Kometa)
	Second	Alessandro Pinarello (ITA)	(VF Group–Bardiani–CSF–Faizanè)
	Third	Edoardo Zambanini (ITA)	(Team Bahrain Victorious)
Jersey awarded to the points classification winner	Points	Giovanni Lonardi (ITA)	(Polti–Kometa)
Jersey awarded to the mountains classification winner	Mountains	Davide Piganzoli (ITA)	(Polti–Kometa)
Jersey awarded to the sprints classification winner	Sprints	Hartthijs de Vries (NED)	(TDT–Unibet Cycling Team)
	Team	(Switzerland) Q36.5 Pro Cycling Team	

The 2024 Tour of Antalya, also known as 2024 Tour of Antalya powered by AKRA for sponsorship reasons, was the 5th edition of the Tour of Antalya road cycling stage race. It was part of UCI Europe Tour in category 2.1.

== Teams ==
Two UCI WorldTeams, nine UCI ProTeams, and fourteen UCI Continental teams make up the twenty-five teams that participated in the race.

UCI WorldTeams

- Alpecin–Deceuninck
- Team Bahrain Victorious

UCI ProTeams

- Bingoal WB
- Polti–Kometa
- Q36.5 Pro Cycling Team
- TDT–Unibet Cycling Team
- Team Corratec–Vini Fantini
- Team Novo Nordisk
- Tudor Pro Cycling Team
- Uno-X Mobility
- VF Group–Bardiani–CSF–Faizanè

UCI Continental Teams

- Adria Mobil
- Bike Aid
- China Glory–Mentech Continental Cycling Team
- Istanbul Büyükșehir Belediye Spor Türkiye
- Spor Toto Cycling Team
- Kinan Racing Team
- Tashkent City Professional Cycling Team
- Tarteletto–Isorex
- Sabgal–Anicolor
- Terengganu Cycling Team
- Konya Büyükşehir Belediyespor
- Team Vorarlberg
- Sakarya BB Pro Team
- Rembe Pro Cycling Team Sauerland

== Route ==
Stage schedule
Stage	Date	Route	Distance	Type	Winner
1	8 February	Side to Antalya	135 km (84 mi)	Flat stage	Timothy Dupont (BEL)
2	9 February	Demre to Antalya	140.5 km (87 mi)	Mountain stage	Matevž Govekar (SLO)
3	10 February	Kemer to Tahtalı	133.4 km (83 mi)	Mountain stage	Davide Piganzoli (ITA)
4	11 February	Antalya to Antalya	183.9 km (114 mi)	Hilly stage	Hartthijs de Vries (NED)

== Stages ==
=== Stage 1 ===
8 February 2024 — Side to Antalya, 135 km (84 mi)

Result of Stage 1
Rank	Rider	Team	Time
1	Timothy Dupont (BEL)	Tarteletto–Isorex	2h 52' 08"
2	Giovanni Lonardi (ITA)	Polti–Kometa	+ 0"
3	Alberto Bruttomesso (ITA)	Team Bahrain Victorious	+ 0"
4	Jensen Plowright (AUS)	Alpecin–Deceuninck	+ 0"
5	Enrico Zanoncello (ITA)	VF Group–Bardiani–CSF–Faizanè	+ 0"
6	Matyáš Kopecký (CZE)	Team Novo Nordisk	+ 0"
7	Szymon Sajnok (POL)	Q36.5 Pro Cycling Team	+ 0"
8	Ma Binyan (CHN)	China Glory–Mentech Continental Cycling Team	+ 0"
9	Marcus Sander Hansen (DEN)	Uno-X Mobility	+ 0"
10	Đorđe Đurić (SRB)	Adria Mobil	+ 0"

General classification after Stage 1
Rank	Rider	Team	Time
1	Timothy Dupont (BEL)	Tarteletto–Isorex	2h 51' 58"
2	Giovanni Lonardi (ITA)	Polti–Kometa	+ 4"
3	Alberto Bruttomesso (ITA)	Team Bahrain Victorious	+ 6"
4	José Sousa (POR)	Sabgal–Anicolor	+ 9"
5	Jensen Plowright (AUS)	Alpecin–Deceuninck	+ 10"
6	Enrico Zanoncello (ITA)	VF Group–Bardiani–CSF–Faizanè	+ 10"
7	Matyáš Kopecký (CZE)	Team Novo Nordisk	+ 10"
8	Szymon Sajnok (POL)	Q36.5 Pro Cycling Team	+ 10"
9	Ma Binyan (CHN)	China Glory–Mentech Continental Cycling Team	+ 10"
10	Marcus Sander Hansen (DEN)	Uno-X Mobility	+ 10"

=== Stage 2 ===
9 February 2024 — Demre to Antalya, 140.5 km (87 mi)

Result of Stage 2
Rank	Rider	Team	Time
1	Matevž Govekar (SLO)	Team Bahrain Victorious	3h 28' 08"
2	Kenneth Van Rooy (BEL)	Bingoal WB	+ 0"
3	Henri Uhlig (GER)	Alpecin–Deceuninck	+ 0"
4	Giovanni Lonardi (ITA)	Polti–Kometa	+ 0"
5	Axel Huens (FRA)	TDT–Unibet Cycling Team	+ 0"
6	Julien Trarieux (FRA)	China Glory–Mentech Continental Cycling Team	+ 0"
7	Enrico Zanoncello (ITA)	VF Group–Bardiani–CSF–Faizanè	+ 0"
8	Cyrus Monk (AUS)	Q36.5 Pro Cycling Team	+ 0"
9	Robbe Claeys (BEL)	Tarteletto–Isorex	+ 0"
10	Kristian Sbaragli (ITA)	Team Corratec–Vini Fantini	+ 0"

General classification after Stage 2
Rank	Rider	Team	Time
1	Matevž Govekar (SLO)	Team Bahrain Victorious	6h 20' 06"
2	Giovanni Lonardi (ITA)	Polti–Kometa	+ 4"
3	Kenneth Van Rooy (BEL)	Bingoal WB	+ 4"
4	Henri Uhlig (GER)	Alpecin–Deceuninck	+ 6"
5	Hannes Wilksch (GER)	Tudor Pro Cycling Team	+ 7"
6	José Sousa (POR)	Sabgal–Anicolor	+ 9"
7	Enrico Zanoncello (ITA)	VF Group–Bardiani–CSF–Faizanè	+ 10"
8	Marcus Sander Hansen (DEN)	Uno-X Mobility	+ 10"
9	Robbe Claeys (BEL)	Tarteletto–Isorex	+ 10"
10	Louis Blouwe (BEL)	Bingoal WB	+ 10"

=== Stage 3 ===
10 February 2024 — Kemer to Tahtalı, 133.4 km (83 mi)

Result of Stage 3
Rank	Rider	Team	Time
1	Davide Piganzoli (ITA)	Polti–Kometa	3h 33' 03"
2	Alessandro Pinarello (ITA)	VF Group–Bardiani–CSF–Faizanè	+ 14"
3	Edoardo Zambanini (ITA)	Team Bahrain Victorious	+ 18"
4	Anatolii Budiak (UKR)	Terengganu Cycling Team	+ 22"
5	Simon Dalby (DEN)	Uno-X Mobility	+ 23"
6	Matteo Badilatti (SUI)	Q36.5 Pro Cycling Team	+ 24"
7	Sébastien Reichenbach (SUI)	Tudor Pro Cycling Team	+ 24"
8	Anton Schiffer (GER)	Bike Aid	+ 26"
9	Alex Bogna (AUS)	Alpecin–Deceuninck	+ 28"
10	Frederico Figueiredo (POR)	Sabgal–Anicolor	+ 36"

General classification after Stage 3
Rank	Rider	Team	Time
1	Davide Piganzoli (ITA)	Polti–Kometa	9h 53' 09"
2	Alessandro Pinarello (ITA)	VF Group–Bardiani–CSF–Faizanè	+ 18"
3	Edoardo Zambanini (ITA)	Team Bahrain Victorious	+ 24"
4	Anatolii Budiak (UKR)	Terengganu Cycling Team	+ 32"
5	Simon Dalby (DEN)	Uno-X Mobility	+ 33"
6	Sébastien Reichenbach (SUI)	Tudor Pro Cycling Team	+ 34"
7	Anton Schiffer (GER)	Bike Aid	+ 36"
8	Valerio Conti (ITA)	Team Corratec–Vini Fantini	+ 47"
9	Ådne Holter (NOR)	Uno-X Mobility	+ 49"
10	Giulio Pellizzari (ITA)	VF Group–Bardiani–CSF–Faizanè	+ 55"

=== Stage 4 ===
11 February 2024 — Antalya to Antalya, 183.9 km (114 mi)

Result of Stage 4
Rank	Rider	Team	Time
1	Hartthijs de Vries (NED)	TDT–Unibet Cycling Team	4h 16' 08"
2	Fabio Van den Bossche (BEL)	Alpecin–Deceuninck	+ 0"
3	Alessandro Fancellu (ITA)	Q36.5 Pro Cycling Team	+ 0"
4	Roland Thalmann (SUI)	Tudor Pro Cycling Team	+ 0"
5	Ådne Holter (NOR)	Uno-X Mobility	+ 0"
6	Halvor Dolven (NOR)	Uno-X Mobility	+ 0"
7	Szymon Sajnok (POL)	Q36.5 Pro Cycling Team	+ 21"
8	Lorenzo Conforti (ITA)	VF Group–Bardiani–CSF–Faizanè	+ 21"
9	Giovanni Lonardi (ITA)	Polti–Kometa	+ 21"
10	Julien Trarieux (FRA)	China Glory–Mentech Continental Cycling Team	+ 21"

General classification after Stage 4
Rank	Rider	Team	Time
1	Davide Piganzoli (ITA)	Polti–Kometa	14h 09' 38"
2	Alessandro Pinarello (ITA)	VF Group–Bardiani–CSF–Faizanè	+ 18"
3	Edoardo Zambanini (ITA)	Team Bahrain Victorious	+ 24"
4	Ådne Holter (NOR)	Uno-X Mobility	+ 28"
5	Simon Dalby (DEN)	Uno-X Mobility	+ 33"
6	Sébastien Reichenbach (SUI)	Tudor Pro Cycling Team	+ 34"
7	Anton Schiffer (GER)	Bike Aid	+ 36"
8	Hartthijs de Vries (NED)	TDT–Unibet Cycling Team	+ 39"
9	Valerio Conti (ITA)	Team Corratec–Vini Fantini	+ 47"
10	Alessandro Fancellu (ITA)	Q36.5 Pro Cycling Team	+ 51"

== Classification leadership table ==
Stage	Winner	General classification	Points classification	Mountains classification	Intermediate sprints classification	Teams classification
1	Timothy Dupont	Timothy Dupont	Timothy Dupont	Henri Uhlig	Paul Wright	Polti–Kometa
2	Matevž Govekar	Matevž Govekar	Giovanni Lonardi	Natnael Berhane	Jensen Plowright	Q36.5 Pro Cycling Team
3	Davide Piganzoli	Davide Piganzoli	Giovanni Lonardi	Natnael Berhane	Axel Huens	VF Group–Bardiani–CSF–Faizanè
4	Hartthijs de Vries	Davide Piganzoli	Giovanni Lonardi	Davide Piganzoli	Hartthijs de Vries	Q36.5 Pro Cycling Team
Final		Davide Piganzoli	Giovanni Lonardi	Davide Piganzoli	Hartthijs de Vries	Q36.5 Pro Cycling Team

== Classification standings ==
Legend
Denotes the leader of the general classification	Denotes the leader of the mountains classification
Denotes the leader of the points classification	Denotes the leader of the intermediate sprints classification

=== General classification ===
Final general classification (1–10)
Rank	Rider	Team	Time
1	Davide Piganzoli (ITA)	Polti–Kometa	14h 09' 38"
2	Alessandro Pinarello (ITA)	VF Group–Bardiani–CSF–Faizanè	+ 18"
3	Edoardo Zambanini (ITA)	Team Bahrain Victorious	+ 24"
4	Ådne Holter (NOR)	Uno-X Mobility	+ 28"
5	Simon Dalby (DEN)	Uno-X Mobility	+ 33"
6	Sébastien Reichenbach (SUI)	Tudor Pro Cycling Team	+ 34"
7	Anton Schiffer (GER)	Bike Aid	+ 36"
8	Hartthijs de Vries (NED)	TDT–Unibet Cycling Team	+ 39"
9	Valerio Conti (ITA)	Team Corratec–Vini Fantini	+ 47"
10	Alessandro Fancellu (ITA)	Q36.5 Pro Cycling Team	+ 51"

=== Points classification ===
Final points classification (1–10)
Rank	Rider	Team	Points
1	Giovanni Lonardi (ITA)	Polti–Kometa	6
2	Davide Piganzoli (ITA)	Polti–Kometa	5
3	Matevž Govekar (SLO)	Team Bahrain Victorious	5
4	Axel Huens (FRA)	TDT–Unibet Cycling Team	4
5	Alessandro Pinarello (ITA)	VF Group–Bardiani–CSF–Faizanè	4
6	Kenneth Van Rooy (BEL)	Bingoal WB	4
7	Hannes Wilksch (GER)	Q36.5 Pro Cycling Team	3
8	Paul Wright (NZL)	Rembe Pro Cycling Team Sauerland	3
9	Edoardo Zambanini (ITA)	Team Bahrain Victorious	3
10	Henri Uhlig (GER)	Alpecin–Deceuninck	3

=== Mountains classification ===
Final mountains classification (1-10)
Rank	Rider	Team	Points
1	Davide Piganzoli (ITA)	Polti–Kometa	14
2	Alessandro Pinarello (ITA)	VF Group–Bardiani–CSF–Faizanè	13
3	Natnael Berhane (ERI)	Istanbul Büyükșehir Belediye Spor Türkiye	12
4	Anatolii Budiak (UKR)	Terengganu Cycling Team	9
5	Anton Schiffer (GER)	Bike Aid	8
6	Cyrus Monk (AUS)	Q36.5 Pro Cycling Team	7
7	Alessandro Monaco (ITA)	Team Corratec–Vini Fantini	7
8	Cedrik Bakke Christophersen (NOR)	TDT–Unibet Cycling Team	7
9	Willie Smit (RSA)	China Glory–Mentech Continental Cycling Team	6
10	Edoardo Zambanini (ITA)	Team Bahrain Victorious	6

=== Intermediate sprints rider classification ===
Final intermediate sprints classification (1–10)
Rank	Rider	Team	Time
1	Hartthijs de Vries (NED)	TDT–Unibet Cycling Team	3
2	Axel Huens (FRA)	TDT–Unibet Cycling Team	3
3	Jensen Plowright (AUS)	Alpecin–Deceuninck	3
4	Paul Wright (NZL)	Rembe Pro Cycling Team Sauerland	3
5	Fabio Van den Bossche (BEL)	Alpecin–Deceuninck	2
6	Cyrus Monk (AUS)	Q36.5 Pro Cycling Team	2
7	Erik Fetter (HUN)	Polti–Kometa	2
8	Pirmin Eisenbarth (GER)	Bike Aid	2
9	Roland Thalmann (SUI)	Q36.5 Pro Cycling Team	1
10	Alessandro Monaco (ITA)	Team Corratec–Vini Fantini	1

=== Team classification ===
Final team classification (1–10)
Rank	Team	Time
1	(Switzerland) Q36.5 Pro Cycling Team	42h 31' 22"
2	(Italy) VF Group–Bardiani–CSF–Faizanè	+ 6"
3	(Italy) Polti–Kometa	+ 45"
4	(Norway) Uno-X Mobility	+ 56"
5	(Switzerland) Tudor Pro Cycling Team	+ 2' 17"
6	(France) TDT–Unibet Cycling Team	+ 2' 20"
7	(Belgium) Bingoal WB	+ 9' 38"
8	China Glory–Mentech Continental Cycling Team	+ 9' 43"
9	(Portugal) Sabgal–Anicolor	+ 14' 09"
10	Team Bahrain Victorious	+ 14' 15"
