= 2025 Visma–Lease a Bike (men's team) season =

Visma–Lease a Bike
- 2025 season
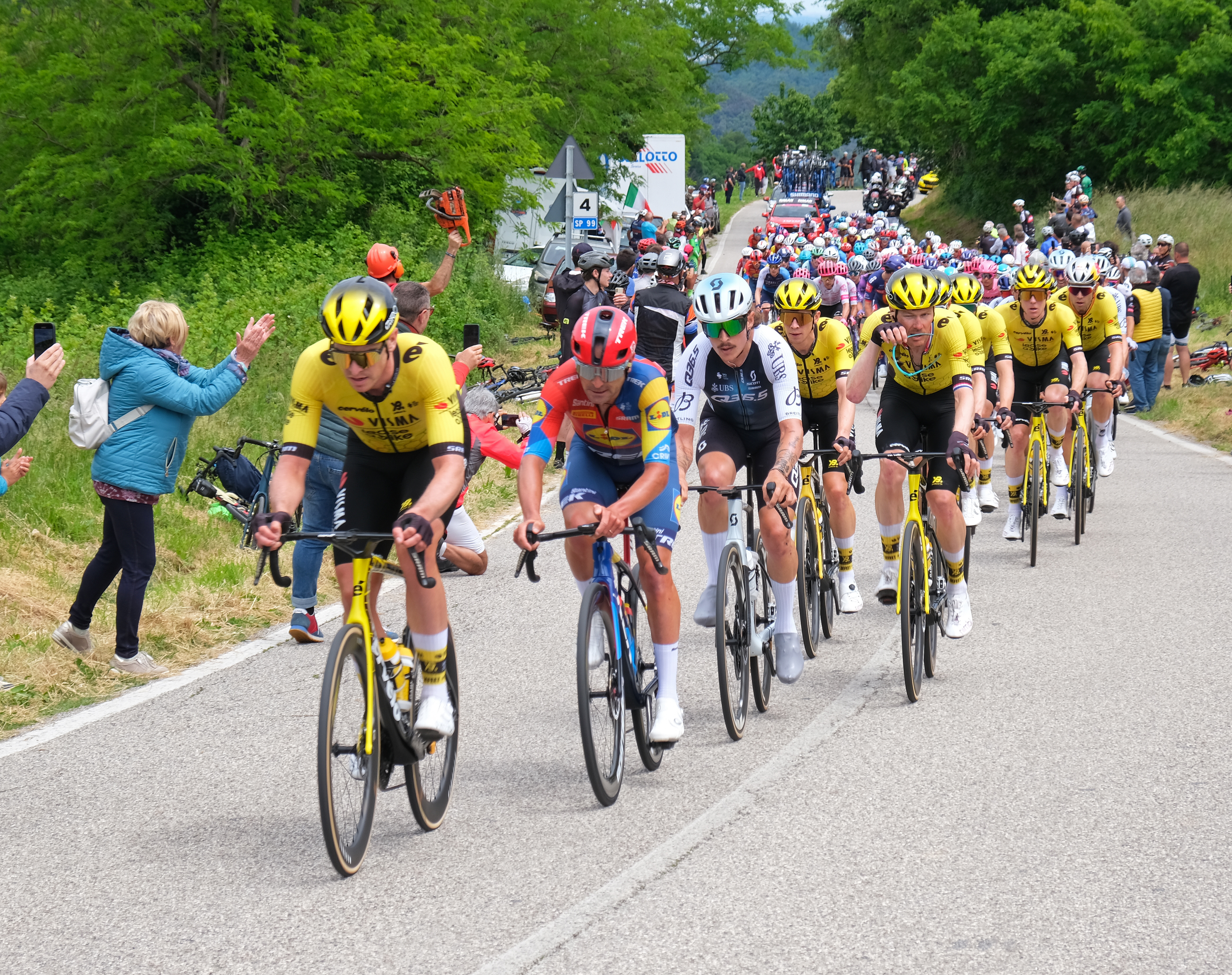
- Visma–Lease a Bike leading the peloton on Roverello pass, stage 13 of Giro d'Italia 2025
- UCI code: TVL
- Status: UCI WorldTeam
- Manager: Richard Plugge (NED)
- Main sponsor(s): Visma; Lease a Bike
- Based: Netherlands
- Bicycles: Cervélo
- Groupset: SRAM

Season victories
- One-day races: 1
- Stage race overall: 7
- Stage race stages: 30
- Most wins: (United Kingdom) Matthew Brennan (11)

The 2025 season for Visma–Lease a Bike is the team's 42nd season overall and the second season under the current name. The team has been a UCI WorldTeam since 2005, when the tier was first established.

== Team roster ==
All ages are as of 1 January 2025, the first day of the 2025 season.

As of 4 January 2025.

Rider	Date of birth
Edoardo Affini (ITA)	24 June 1996 (aged 28)
Niklas Behrens (GER)	6 November 2003 (aged 21)
Tiesj Benoot (BEL)	11 March 1994 (aged 30)
Matthew Brennan (GBR)	6 August 2005 (aged 19)
Victor Campenaerts (BEL)	28 October 1991 (aged 33)
Thomas Gloag (GBR)	13 September 2001 (aged 23)
Tijmen Graat (NED)	10 January 2003 (aged 21)
Per Strand Hagenes (NOR)	10 July 2003 (aged 21)
Menno Huising (NED)	8 April 2004 (aged 20)
Matteo Jorgenson (USA)	1 July 1999 (aged 25)
Wilco Kelderman (NED)	25 March 1991 (aged 33)
Olav Kooij (NED)	17 October 2001 (aged 23)
Steven Kruijswijk (NED)	7 June 1987 (aged 37)
Sepp Kuss (USA)	13 September 1994 (aged 30)
Christophe Laporte (FRA)	11 December 1992 (aged 32)

Rider	Date of birth
Bart Lemmen (NED)	14 October 1995 (aged 29)
Daniel McLay (GBR)	3 January 1992 (aged 32)
Jørgen Nordhagen (NOR)	10 January 2005 (aged 19)
Ben Tulett (GBR)	26 August 2001 (aged 23)
Cian Uijtdebroeks (BEL)	28 February 2003 (aged 21)
Attila Valter (HUN)	12 June 1998 (aged 26)
Wout van Aert (BEL)	15 September 1994 (aged 30)
Dylan van Baarle (NED)	21 May 1992 (aged 32)
Loe van Belle (NED)	24 January 2002 (aged 22)
Tosh Van der Sande (BEL)	28 November 1990 (aged 34)
Julien Vermote (BEL)	26 July 1989 (aged 35)
Jonas Vingegaard (DEN)	10 December 1996 (aged 28)
Simon Yates (GBR)	7 August 1992 (aged 32)
Axel Zingle (FRA)	18 December 1998 (aged 26)

== Season victories ==
Date	Race	Competition	Rider	Country	Location	Ref.
8 February	Tour of Oman, stage 1	UCI ProSeries	Olav Kooij (NED)	Oman	Bimmah Sinkhole	
11 February	Tour of Oman, stage 4	UCI ProSeries	Olav Kooij (NED)	Oman	Oman Convention and Exhibition Centre	
23 February	Volta ao Algarve, stage 5 (ITT)	UCI ProSeries	Jonas Vingegaard (DEN)	Portugal	Alto do Malhão	
23 February	Volta ao Algarve, overall	UCI ProSeries	Jonas Vingegaard (DEN)	Portugal		
11 March	Paris–Nice, stage 3 (TTT)	UCI World Tour	(Note: The riders in the squad were Matteo Jorgenson, Edoardo Affini, Victor Campenaerts, Per Strand Hagenes, Bart Lemmen, Jonas Vingegaard and Axel Zingle.)	France	Nevers	
13 March	Tirreno–Adriatico, stage 4	UCI World Tour	Olav Kooij (NED)	Italy	Trasacco	
16 March	Paris–Nice, overall	UCI World Tour	Matteo Jorgenson (USA)	France		
20 March	Grand Prix de Denain	UCI ProSeries	Matthew Brennan (GBR)	France	Denain	
24 March	Volta a Catalunya, stage 1	UCI World Tour	Matthew Brennan (GBR)	Spain	Sant Feliu de Guíxols	
28 March	Settimana Internazionale di Coppi e Bartali, stage 4	UCI Europe Tour	Ben Tulett (GBR)	Italy	Brisighella	
28 March	Volta a Catalunya, stage 5	UCI World Tour	Matthew Brennan (GBR)	Spain	Amposta	
29 March	Settimana Internazionale di Coppi e Bartali, overall	UCI Europe Tour	Ben Tulett (GBR)	Italy		
30 April	Tour de Romandie, stage 1	UCI World Tour	Matthew Brennan (GBR)	Switzerland	Fribourg	
14 May	Four Days of Dunkirk, stage 1	UCI ProSeries	Axel Zingle (FRA)	France	Amiens	
18 May	Giro d'Italia, stage 9	UCI World Tour	Wout van Aert (BEL)	Italy	Siena	
22 May	Giro d'Italia, stage 12	UCI World Tour	Olav Kooij (NED)	Italy	Viadana	
30 May	Tour of Norway, stage 2	UCI ProSeries	Matthew Brennan (GBR)	Norway	Oltedal	
1 June	Tour of Norway, stage 4	UCI ProSeries	Matthew Brennan (GBR)	Norway	Stavanger	
1 June	Tour of Norway, overall	UCI ProSeries	Matthew Brennan (GBR)	Norway		
1 June	Giro d'Italia, stage 21	UCI World Tour	Olav Kooij (NED)	Italy	Rome	
1 June	Giro d'Italia, overall	UCI World Tour	Simon Yates (GBR)	Italy		
14 July	Tour de France, stage 10	UCI World Tour	Simon Yates (GBR)	France	Mont-Dore (Puy de Sancy)	
27 July	Tour de France, stage 21	UCI World Tour	Wout van Aert (BEL)	France	Paris	
4 August	Tour de Pologne, stage 1	UCI World Tour	Olav Kooij (NED)	Poland	Legnica	
8 August	Tour de Pologne, stage 5	UCI World Tour	Matthew Brennan (GBR)	Poland	Zakopane	
8 August	Tour de l'Ain, stage 3	UCI Europe Tour	Cian Uijtdebroeks (BEL)	France	Belley	
8 August	Tour de l'Ain, overall	UCI Europe Tour	Cian Uijtdebroeks (BEL)	France		
21 August	Deutschland Tour, stage 1	UCI ProSeries	Matthew Brennan (GBR)	Germany	Herford	
21 August	Renewi Tour, stage 2	UCI World Tour	Olav Kooij (NED)	Belgium	Ardooie	
24 August	Vuelta a España, stage 2	UCI World Tour	Jonas Vingegaard (DEN)	Italy	Limone Piemonte	
24 August	Deutschland Tour, stage 4	UCI ProSeries	Matthew Brennan (GBR)	Germany	Magdeburg	
31 August	Vuelta a España, stage 9	UCI World Tour	Jonas Vingegaard (DEN)	Spain	Valdezcaray	
2 September	Tour of Britain, stage 1	UCI ProSeries	Olav Kooij (NED)	United Kingdom	Southwold	
3 September	Tour of Britain, stage 2	UCI ProSeries	Olav Kooij (NED)	United Kingdom	Stowmarket	
4 September	Tour of Britain, stage 3	UCI ProSeries	Matthew Brennan (GBR)	United Kingdom	Ampthill	
7 September	Tour of Britain, stage 6	UCI ProSeries	Olav Kooij (NED)	United Kingdom	Cardiff	
13 September	Vuelta a España, stage 20	UCI World Tour	Jonas Vingegaard (DEN)	Spain	Bola del Mundo	
14 September	Vuelta a España, overall	UCI World Tour	Jonas Vingegaard (DEN)	Spain		
