= 2025 Tour of Oman =

Omani cycling race

2025 UCI ProSeries

Race details
- Dates: 8–12 February 2025
- Stages: 5
- Distance: 881.4 km (547.7 mi)
- Winning time: 21h 13' 18"

Results
Jersey awarded to the overall winner	Winner	Adam Yates (GBR)	(UAE Team Emirates XRG)
	Second	Valentin Paret-Peintre (FRA)	(Soudal–Quick-Step)
	Third	David Gaudu (FRA)	(Groupama–FDJ)
Jersey awarded to the points classification winner	Points	Valentin Paret-Peintre (FRA)	(Soudal–Quick-Step)
Jersey awarded to the young rider classification winner	Young rider	Valentin Paret-Peintre (FRA)	(Soudal–Quick-Step)
Jersey awarded to the sprints classification winner	Sprints	Rodrigo Álvarez (ESP)	(Burgos Burpellet BH)
	Team	(Switzerland) Q36.5 Pro Cycling Team	

The 2025 Tour of Oman is a road cycling stage race that takes place between 8 and 12 February 2025 in Oman. The race is rated as a Category 2. Pro event on the 2025 UCI ProSeries calendar, and is the 14th edition of the Tour of Oman.

== Teams ==
Nine UCI WorldTeams, five UCI ProTeams, three UCI Continentalteams, and the Omani national team made up the 18 teams that participated in the race.

UCI WorldTeams

- Arkéa–B&B Hotels
- Groupama–FDJ
- Movistar Team
- Soudal–Quick-Step
- Team Jayco–AlUla
- Team Picnic–PostNL
- UAE Team Emirates XRG
- Visma–Lease a Bike
- XDS Astana Team

UCI ProTeams

- Burgos Burpellet BH
- Q36.5 Pro Cycling Team
- Team TotalEnergies
- Tudor Pro Cycling Team
- Uno-X Mobility

UCI Continental Teams

- Team UKYO
- Roojai Insurance
- Terengganu Cycling Team

National Teams

- Oman

== Route ==
Stage characteristics and winners
Stage	Date	Course	Distance	Type	Stage winner
1	8 February	Bushar to Bimmah Sink Hole	177.7 km (110.4 mi)	Flat stage	Olav Kooij (NED)
2	9 February	Al Rustaq Fort to Yitti Hills	202.9 km (126.1 mi)	Hilly stage	Louis Vervaeke (BEL)
3	10 February	Fanja to Eastern Mountain	180.8 km (112.3 mi)	Hilly stage	David Gaudu (FRA)
4	11 February	Oman Across Ages Museum to Oman Convention and Exhibition Centre (OCEC)	181.5 km (112.8 mi)	Flat stage	Olav Kooij (NED)
5	12 February	Imty to Jabal al Akhdhar (Green Mountain)	138.5 km (86.1 mi)	Mountain stage	Valentin Paret-Peintre (FRA)
Total			881.4 km (547.7 mi)		

== Stages ==
=== Stage 1 ===
8 February 2025 — Bushar to Bimmah Sink Hole, 177.7 km (110.4 mi)

Stage 1 Result
Rank	Rider	Team	Time
1	Olav Kooij (NED)	Visma–Lease a Bike	4h 27' 19"
2	Pavel Bittner (CZE)	Team Picnic–PostNL	+ 0"
3	Erlend Blikra (NOR)	Uno-X Mobility	+ 0"
4	Andrea D'Amato (ITA)	Team UKYO	+ 0"
5	Rick Pluimers (NED)	Tudor Pro Cycling Team	+ 0"
6	Fernando Gaviria (COL)	Movistar Team	+ 0"
7	Anthony Turgis (FRA)	Team TotalEnergies	+ 0"
8	Emilien Jeannière (FRA)	Team TotalEnergies	+ 0"
9	Luca Giaimi (ITA)	UAE Team Emirates XRG	+ 0"
10	Giacomo Nizzolo (ITA)	Q36.5 Pro Cycling Team	+ 0"

General classification after Stage 1
Rank	Rider	Team	Time
1	Olav Kooij (NED)	Visma–Lease a Bike	4h 27' 09"
2	Pavel Bittner (CZE)	Team Picnic–PostNL	+ 4"
3	Rodrigo Álvarez (ESP)	Burgos Burpellet BH	+ 5"
4	Erlend Blikra (NOR)	Uno-X Mobility	+ 6"
5	David Gaudu (FRA)	Groupama–FDJ	+ 9"
6	Andrea D'Amato (ITA)	Team UKYO	+ 10"
7	Rick Pluimers (NED)	Tudor Pro Cycling Team	+ 10"
8	Fernando Gaviria (COL)	Movistar Team	+ 10"
9	Anthony Turgis (FRA)	Team TotalEnergies	+ 10"
10	Emilien Jeannière (FRA)	Team TotalEnergies	+ 10"

=== Stage 2 ===
9 February 2025 — Al Rustaq Fort to Yitti Hills, 202.9 km (126.1 mi)

Stage 2 Result
Rank	Rider	Team	Time
1	Louis Vervaeke (BEL)	Soudal–Quick-Step	4h 45' 06"
2	Valentin Paret-Peintre (FRA)	Soudal–Quick-Step	+ 2"
3	Sean Flynn (GBR)	Team Picnic–PostNL	+ 2"
4	Felix Engelhardt (GER)	Team Jayco–AlUla	+ 2"
5	Marco Brenner (GER)	Tudor Pro Cycling Team	+ 2"
6	Henok Mulubrhan (ERI)	XDS Astana Team	+ 2"
7	Steff Cras (BEL)	Team TotalEnergies	+ 2"
8	Adam Yates (GBR)	UAE Team Emirates XRG	+ 2"
9	Mathys Rondel (FRA)	Tudor Pro Cycling Team	+ 2"
10	David Gaudu (FRA)	Groupama–FDJ	+ 2"

General classification after Stage 2
Rank	Rider	Team	Time
1	Louis Vervaeke (BEL)	Soudal–Quick-Step	9h 12' 15"
2	Valentin Paret-Peintre (FRA)	Soudal–Quick-Step	+ 6"
3	Sean Flynn (GBR)	Team Picnic–PostNL	+ 8"
5	David Gaudu (FRA)	Groupama–FDJ	+ 11"
5	Marco Brenner (GER)	Tudor Pro Cycling Team	+ 12"
6	Mathys Rondel (FRA)	Tudor Pro Cycling Team	+ 12"
7	Adam Yates (GBR)	UAE Team Emirates XRG	+ 12"
8	Diego Ulissi (ITA)	XDS Astana Team	+ 12"
9	Alessandro Fancellu (ITA)	Team UKYO	+ 12"
10	Larry Warbasse (USA)	Tudor Pro Cycling Team	+ 12"

=== Stage 3 ===
10 February 2025 — Fanja to Eastern Mountain, 180.8 km (112.3 mi)

Stage 3 Result
Rank	Rider	Team	Time
1	David Gaudu (FRA)	Groupama–FDJ	4h 16' 10"
2	Adam Yates (GBR)	UAE Team Emirates XRG	+ 1"
3	Damien Howson (AUS)	Q36.5 Pro Cycling Team	+ 5"
4	Valentin Paret-Peintre (FRA)	Soudal–Quick-Step	+ 13"
5	Marco Brenner (GER)	Tudor Pro Cycling Team	+ 13"
6	Cian Uijtdebroeks (BEL)	Visma–Lease a Bike	+ 16"
7	Chris Harper (AUS)	Team Jayco–AlUla	+ 16"
8	Diego Ulissi (ITA)	XDS Astana Team	+ 23"
9	Ruben Guerreiro (POR)	Movistar Team	+ 23"
10	Wout Poels (NED)	XDS Astana Team	+ 23"

General classification after Stage 3
Rank	Rider	Team	Time
1	David Gaudu (FRA)	Groupama–FDJ	13h 28' 26"
2	Adam Yates (GBR)	UAE Team Emirates XRG	+ 6"
3	Damien Howson (AUS)	Q36.5 Pro Cycling Team	+ 12"
4	Valentin Paret-Peintre (FRA)	Soudal–Quick-Step	+ 18"
5	Marco Brenner (GER)	Tudor Pro Cycling Team	+ 24"
6	Chris Harper (AUS)	Team Jayco–AlUla	+ 27"
7	Cian Uijtdebroeks (BEL)	Visma–Lease a Bike	+ 27"
8	Diego Ulissi (ITA)	XDS Astana Team	+ 34"
9	Wout Poels (NED)	XDS Astana Team	+ 34"
10	Ruben Guerreiro (POR)	Movistar Team	+ 34"

=== Stage 4 ===
11 February 2025 — Oman Across Ages Museum to Oman Convention and Exhibition Centre (OCEC), 181.5 km (112.8 mi)

Stage 4 Result
Rank	Rider	Team	Time
1	Olav Kooij (NED)	Visma–Lease a Bike	4h 31' 35"
2	Giacomo Nizzolo (ITA)	Q36.5 Pro Cycling Team	+ 0"
3	Orluis Aular (VEN)	Movistar Team	+ 0"
4	Erlend Blikra (NOR)	Uno-X Mobility	+ 0"
5	Max Kanter (GER)	XDS Astana Team	+ 0"
6	Pavel Bittner (CZE)	Team Picnic–PostNL	+ 0"
7	Emilien Jeannière (FRA)	Team TotalEnergies	+ 0"
8	Iván García Cortina (ESP)	Movistar Team	+ 0"
9	Amaury Capiot (BEL)	Arkéa–B&B Hotels	+ 0"
10	Florian Vermeersch (BEL)	UAE Team Emirates XRG	+ 0"

General classification after Stage 4
Rank	Rider	Team	Time
1	David Gaudu (FRA)	Groupama–FDJ	18h 00' 01"
2	Adam Yates (GBR)	UAE Team Emirates XRG	+ 6"
3	Damien Howson (AUS)	Q36.5 Pro Cycling Team	+ 12"
4	Valentin Paret-Peintre (FRA)	Soudal–Quick-Step	+ 18"
5	Marco Brenner (GER)	Tudor Pro Cycling Team	+ 24"
6	Chris Harper (AUS)	Team Jayco–AlUla	+ 27"
7	Cian Uijtdebroeks (BEL)	Visma–Lease a Bike	+ 27"
8	Ruben Guerreiro (POR)	Movistar Team	+ 34"
9	Wout Poels (NED)	XDS Astana Team	+ 34"
10	Embret Svestad-Bårdseng (NOR)	Arkéa–B&B Hotels	+ 38"

=== Stage 5 ===
12 February 2025 — Imty to Jabal al Akhdhar (Green Mountain), 138.5 km (86.1 mi)

Stage 5 Result
Rank	Rider	Team	Time
1	Valentin Paret-Peintre (FRA)	Soudal–Quick-Step	3h 13' 15"
2	Adam Yates (GBR)	UAE Team Emirates XRG	+ 2"
3	David Gaudu (FRA)	Groupama–FDJ	+ 45"
4	Embret Svestad-Bårdseng (NOR)	Arkéa–B&B Hotels	+ 51"
5	Cian Uijtdebroeks (BEL)	Visma–Lease a Bike	+ 51"
6	Wout Poels (NED)	XDS Astana Team	+ 51"
7	Damien Howson (AUS)	Q36.5 Pro Cycling Team	+ 57"
8	Chris Harper (AUS)	Team Jayco–AlUla	+ 57"
9	Jay Vine (AUS)	UAE Team Emirates XRG	+ 1' 15"
10	Marco Brenner (GER)	Tudor Pro Cycling Team	+ 1' 15"

General classification after Stage 5
Rank	Rider	Team	Time
1	Adam Yates (GBR)	UAE Team Emirates XRG	21h 13' 18"
2	Valentin Paret-Peintre (FRA)	Soudal–Quick-Step	+ 6"
3	David Gaudu (FRA)	Groupama–FDJ	+ 39"
4	Damien Howson (AUS)	Q36.5 Pro Cycling Team	+ 1' 07"
5	Cian Uijtdebroeks (BEL)	Visma–Lease a Bike	+ 1' 16"
6	Chris Harper (AUS)	Team Jayco–AlUla	+ 1' 22"
7	Wout Poels (NED)	XDS Astana Team	+ 1' 23"
8	Embret Svestad-Bårdseng (NOR)	Arkéa–B&B Hotels	+ 1' 27"
9	Marco Brenner (GER)	Tudor Pro Cycling Team	+ 1' 37"
10	Simon Dalby (DEN)	Uno-X Mobility	+ 2' 05"

== Classification leadership table ==
Classification leadership by stage
Stage	Winner	General classification	Points classification	Active rider classification	Young rider classification	Team classification
1	Olav Kooij	Olav Kooij	Olav Kooij	Kane Richards	Olav Kooij	Team TotalEnergies
2	Louis Vervaeke	Louis Vervaeke	Louis Vervaeke	Rodrigo Álvarez	Valentin Paret-Peintre	Soudal–Quick-Step
3	David Gaudu	David Gaudu	Valentin Paret-Peintre	Rodrigo Álvarez	Valentin Paret-Peintre	Q36.5 Pro Cycling Team
4	Olav Kooij	David Gaudu	Olav Kooij	Rodrigo Álvarez	Valentin Paret-Peintre	Q36.5 Pro Cycling Team
5	Valentin Paret-Peintre	Adam Yates	Valentin Paret-Peintre	Rodrigo Álvarez	Valentin Paret-Peintre	Q36.5 Pro Cycling Team
Final		Adam Yates	Valentin Paret-Peintre	Rodrigo Álvarez	Valentin Paret-Peintre	Q36.5 Pro Cycling Team

== Classification standings ==
Legend
Denotes the winner of the general classification	Denotes the winner of the active rider classification
Denotes the winner of the points classification	Denotes the winner of the young rider classification

=== General classification ===
Final general classification (1–10)
Rank	Rider	Team	Time
1	Adam Yates (GBR)	UAE Team Emirates XRG	21h 13' 18"
2	Valentin Paret-Peintre (FRA)	Soudal–Quick-Step	+ 6"
3	David Gaudu (FRA)	Groupama–FDJ	+ 39"
4	Damien Howson (AUS)	Q36.5 Pro Cycling Team	+ 1' 07"
5	Cian Uijtdebroeks (BEL)	Visma–Lease a Bike	+ 1' 16"
6	Chris Harper (AUS)	Team Jayco–AlUla	+ 1' 22"
7	Wout Poels (NED)	XDS Astana Team	+ 1' 23"
8	Embret Svestad-Bårdseng (NOR)	Arkéa–B&B Hotels	+ 1' 27"
9	Marco Brenner (GER)	Tudor Pro Cycling Team	+ 1' 37"
10	Simon Dalby (DEN)	Uno-X Mobility	+ 2' 05"

=== Points classification ===
Final points classification (1–10)
Rank	Rider	Team	Points
1	Valentin Paret-Peintre (FRA)	Soudal–Quick-Step	34
2	Olav Kooij (NED)	Visma–Lease a Bike	30
3	Adam Yates (GBR)	UAE Team Emirates XRG	27
4	David Gaudu (FRA)	Groupama–FDJ	26
5	Pavel Bittner (CZE)	Team Picnic–PostNL	19
6	Erlend Blikra (NOR)	Uno-X Mobility	16
7	Louis Vervaeke (BEL)	Soudal–Quick-Step	15
8	Sean Flynn (GBR)	Team Picnic–PostNL	14
9	Giacomo Nizzolo (ITA)	Q36.5 Pro Cycling Team	14
10	Damien Howson (AUS)	Q36.5 Pro Cycling Team	13

=== Active rider classification ===
Final active rider classification (1–10)
Rank	Rider	Team	Points
1	Rodrigo Álvarez (ESP)	Burgos Burpellet BH	15
2	Kane Richards (AUS)	Roojai Insurance	13
3	Louis Vervaeke (BEL)	Soudal–Quick-Step	8
4	David Gaudu (FRA)	Groupama–FDJ	6
5	Nicolas Vinokurov (KAZ)	XDS Astana Team	6
6	Muhammad Haizam Mohd Shabri (MAS)	Terengganu Cycling Team	6
7	Magnus Kulset (NOR)	Uno-X Mobility	6
8	Sean Flynn (GBR)	Team Picnic–PostNL	5
9	Amaury Capiot (BEL)	Arkéa–B&B Hotels	5
10	Mohamed Al-Wahibi (OMN)	Oman	5

=== Young rider classification ===
Final young rider classification (1–10)
Rank	Rider	Team	Time
1	Valentin Paret-Peintre (FRA)	Soudal–Quick-Step	21h 13' 24"
2	Cian Uijtdebroeks (BEL)	Visma–Lease a Bike	+ 1' 10"
3	Embret Svestad-Bårdseng (NOR)	Arkéa–B&B Hotels	+ 1' 21"
4	Marco Brenner (GER)	Tudor Pro Cycling Team	+ 1' 31"
5	Simon Dalby (DEN)	Uno-X Mobility	+ 1' 59"
6	Nahom Zeray (ERI)	Team UKYO	+ 2' 06"
7	Mario Aparicio (ESP)	Burgos Burpellet BH	+ 2' 21"
8	Kevin Vermaerke (USA)	Team Picnic–PostNL	+ 2' 39"
9	Mathys Rondel (FRA)	Tudor Pro Cycling Team	+ 3' 18"
10	Gianmarco Garofoli (ITA)	Soudal–Quick-Step	+ 3' 53"

=== Team classification ===
Final team classification (1–10)
Rank	Team	Time
1	(Switzerland) Q36.5 Pro Cycling Team	63h 46' 07"
2	(Switzerland) Tudor Pro Cycling Team	+ 2' 17"
3	(Kazakhstan) XDS Astana Team	+ 2' 55"
4	(Belgium) Soudal–Quick-Step	+ 3' 42"
5	(Spain) Burgos Burpellet BH	+ 4' 24"
6	(France) Arkéa–B&B Hotels	+ 4' 40"
7	(Malaysia) Terengganu Cycling Team	+ 6' 54"
8	(Australia) Team Jayco–AlUla	+ 7' 01"
9	(Netherlands) Team Picnic–PostNL	+ 7' 03"
10	(United Arab Emirates) UAE Team Emirates XRG	+ 8' 05"
