= Bimah =

Bimah or Bimmah may refer to:

- Bema: Judaism; bema, in Jewish contexts bimah or bima: an elevated platform, a dais; also "stage" in Modern Hebrew
- Bimah Prefecture in Togo, West Africa
- Bimah, Oman, a village in Al Hamra Province, Ad Dakhiliyah Governorate, Oman 23°12′29″N 57°22′53″E
- Bimmah, Oman, a village in eastern Muscat Governorate near Bimmah Sinkhole, Oman 22°59′24″N 59°08′18″E

== See also ==
- Habima Theatre, lit. "The Stage [bima(h)] Theatre"
