= Omran Company =

Tourism company of Oman

Oman Tourism Development Company (OMRAN) is a Government owned company mandated to drive the investment, growth and development of the tourism sector in the Sultanate of Oman. Established in 2005, they are the master developers of major tourism, heritage and urban developments.

== History ==
Omran was established to support Oman's emerging tourism sector, with a directive to take over the development of the tourism infrastructure in the Sultanate of Oman. The first project completed by OMRAN was the Millennium Resort Mussanah, formerly the site of the Second Asian Beach Games in 2010.

In 2014, OMRAN's mandate was broadened and the company underwent restructuring. Omran was handed all responsibility for tourism infrastructure development, leaving the Ministry of Tourism with a regulatory role. The company is now responsible for mega-developments including large mixed use projects.

== Developments, Assets and Joint Ventures ==
=== Partners / JVs ===
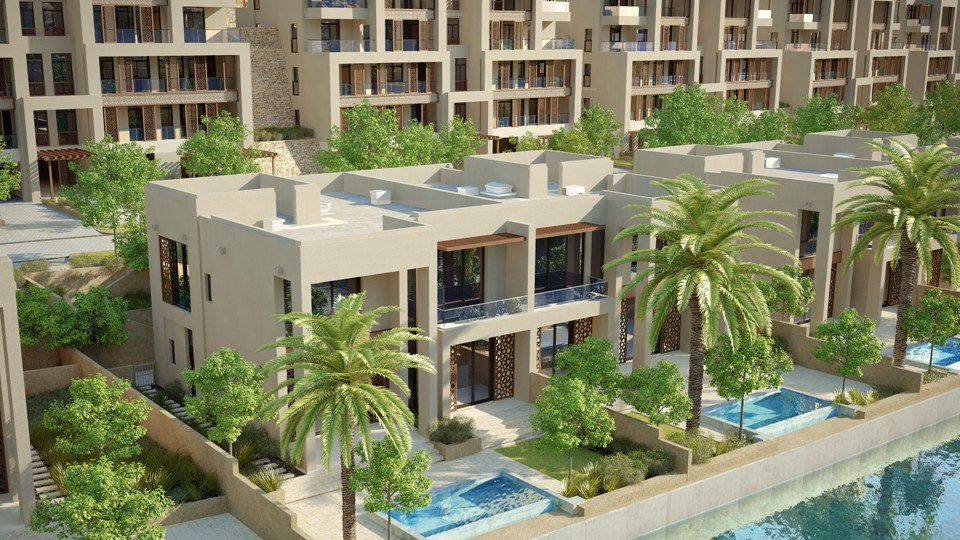
Saraya Bandar Jissah

- Saraya Bandar Jissah
- Musstir LLC
- Orascom Hotels & Development
- Al Futtaim Group
- Oman National Investments Developments Company
- Duqm Development Company
- Middle East Hospitality

=== Subsidiaries ===
In 2014 three new OMRAN subsidiary companies were established to accommodate Omran's new operating mandate.

- National Omani Hospitality Company is a hospitality operator company. Presently, National Omani Hospitality Company manages two hotels under the brand name 'Atana' — Oman's first local hotel chain.
- Oman Heritage Development and Project Management Company is a subsidiary dedicated to the tourism management of Oman's culture and heritage sites.
- Oman Project Management & Development Company is responsible for developing and executing tourism projects throughout the Sultanate. The company is tasked to work on Omran and Ministry of Tourism's small and medium projects and executing single asset projects and related tourism infrastructure.

=== Developments ===
Several developments have been recently completed or are under way:

- Oman Convention and Exhibition Centre (OCEC) - Scheduled to open in 2017, the larger OCEC complex (Wadi Irfan) will include four hotels, a business park, retail shopping areas and residential districts, surrounded by a nature reserve. The completed OCEC will also feature the largest fixed seating auditorium in the GCC (3,200 seats) and the largest car park structure in Oman (4,200 spaces), the country's largest district cooling plant (32,500 refrigeration tons), the largest steel truss span (80 metres) supporting the Exhibition Halls and the largest dome in Oman (120 metre span).
- Al Irfan Urban Development - The Government of Oman is contemplating the development of a master plan to create a new city centre overlooking the site of Muscat International Airport and adjacent to the Oman Convention and Exhibition Centre. In 2014, the Government of Oman officially appointed Omran as the developer for the Hay Al Irfan Urban Centre, the Sultanate's largest urban development. It will create a new downtown area for the Muscat capital district that will set a model for planning other modern cities across the Sultanate.
- W Hotel - The 5 star hotel will be located in Muscat's Shatti Al Qurum District, adjacent to the Royal Opera House. Once completed the hotel will cover a gross floor area of approximately 46,000 m^{2} on 9 levels and will be operated by Starwood Hotels and Resorts and feature 287 hotel rooms and suites, including 29 suites, 4 special suites and one royal villa. The property will also include spa facilities, multiple dining venues, swimming pools and water features, a fitness centre, ballroom, meeting rooms, retail space and business centre.
- Atana Hotels - The Arabic name ‘Atana’ which translates as ‘came to us’ is the first Omani hotel brand in the Sultanate. Run by the National Omani Hospitality Company LLC, Atana Hotels have two hotels in operation in Musandam and Khasab.
- Al Baleed Seafood Restaurant - Set on 13,000 m^{2} of coastline facing a lagoon on the Arabian Sea, Al Baleed Seafood Restaurant will feature a 60-seat indoor restaurant and buffet and 50 seat outdoor patio dining area plus a 30-seat rooftop dining area.
- Rest Areas - The Quriyat-Sur Rest Area is located in the proximity of the touristic site of the Bimmah Sinkhole and is the pilot project in Omran's "Rest Areas" concept – to develop a nationwide network of rest areas along Oman's main roads and highways. Construction began on September 18, 2013, with project completion scheduled for 2015.

=== Assets ===
In addition to its projects and investments, Omran is also responsible for a portfolio of hotels‚ resorts and tourism assets under various levels of supervision and management. Some of these are owned by Omran while some are managed on behalf of others.

There are currently 10 properties in Omran's Asset Management portfolio including:

- Alila Jabal Akhdar Set 2000 metres above sea level two hours’ drive from Muscat, Alila Jabal Akhdar is the first resort development in the mountainous Jabal Akhdar region of Oman. The resort, run by boutique Asian hotelier Alila Hotels & Resorts, In March 2015 the property received the LEED Silver certification in the Building Design and Construction rating system for New Construction by the U.S. Green Building Council. The certification makes Alila Jabal Akhdar the first development in Oman to receive the eco label.
- Intercontinental Hotel Muscat - The InterContinental Muscat is one of the city's longest-standing five star hotel properties and has 258 guest rooms‚ ten suites‚ six restaurants and bars‚ and large banqueting facilities. The 35-acre site is owned and managed by Omran.
- Millennium Resort Mussanah Formerly the site of the Second Asian Beach Games‚ the Millennium Resort – Mussanah operates as a mixed-use residential‚ commercial and tourism destination.
- City Hotel Duqm - A 3- star hotel built by Omran at Duqm, Al Wusta region. The soft opening for the hotel was held in May 2012 and it was officially opened in December 2012. The hotel consists of 120 guest rooms with options of single, double, twin beds, and 5 suite rooms.
- Crowne Plaza Hotel Duqm - Located in the new town of Duqm‚ on the east coast of Oman, this 4-Star Business Hotel and Conference Centre services Al Duqm Port and Dry-dock. The Crowne Plaza Duqm features 213 rooms and suites.
- Golden Tulip Dibbah - Opened in 2006‚ the Golden Tulip Resort in Dibbah is a three star property with 54 rooms‚ cafes and restaurants‚ and a health club.
- Ras Al Jinz Scientific Centre - The Ras Al Jinz Scientific Centre was constructed by the Ministry of Tourism‚ along with Oman LNG. The centre is situated in the Ras Al Hadd Turtle Reserve‚ a world-renowned nesting site for the green turtle. Omran took over management of the 19-room eco lodge and scientific centre in September 2009.
- Masirah Island Resort - Masirah Island Resort is located in Masirah‚ Oman's largest island and located 15 kilometres off the south-east coast of Oman.
- Atana Khasab - Part of the local Omani Hotel Chain Atana, the 4 star resort is located in the Musandam Peninsular.
- Atana Musandam - Atana Musandam Resort is located on the northern tip of the Musandam peninsula near Khasab Airport. This resort was opened in July 2014 and is decorated with modern Omani art. The Atana Musandam Resort includes 105 guest rooms and suites, each overlooking the Musandam Sea or surrounding mountains.

=== Joint ventures ===
- Jebel Sifah - Located 45 kilometers from Muscat, Jebel Sifah is a 6.2 million square meter Integrated Tourism Complex (ITC) development encompassing 950 homes, four hotels including Sifawy Boutique Hotel (55) rooms, Missoni (250) rooms, Four Season (200) rooms, and Banyan Tree (240) rooms, an 18- hole PGA-standard golf course, retail outlets and a 200-berth in-land marina. The soft opening of Sifawy Hotel was held in September 2011.The soft opening of the 200 berth marina was held in March 2012 and the official opening of both the Sifawy Boutique Hotel and Marina was held on May 1, 2012.
- Hawana Salalah - Spread over an area of 15.6 million square meters, Hawana Salalah is an integrated tourism complex, comprising 1150 luxury freehold apartments and villas, a shopping and retail outlets, four hotels including Juweira (65) rooms, Movenpick (392) rooms, Rotana (400) rooms, and Club Med (440) rooms, two 18-hole PGA-standard golf courses and a 200-berth inland marina.
- Al Baleed Resort - Located in the Dhofar region of Oman, the resort will feature 106 one, two, and three bedroom chalets. The main hotel building will house 28 guest rooms and a range of recreation facilities.
- Duqm Frontier Town - Duqm Development Company SAOC (DDC) was established in 2010 as a 50-50 joint venture between OMRAN and Daewoo Shipbuilding & Marine Engineering Oman LLC "DSME Oman" to develop Duqm Frontier Town. The 36.7 Million RO project covers various stages of development that will deliver residential units, shops and many other facilities in the Duqm dry dock area.
- Saraya Bandar Jissah - Located half an hour southeast of Muscat, Saraya Bandar Jissah is a $600 million project. The project consist of 2 five star hotels (200 key and 120 key), and 398 villas, townhouses, duplexes and apartments spread across five residential zones: Safa, Na’eem, Zaha, Nameer and Wajd.

== Corporate Responsibility ==
=== Environment ===
In March 2014 Omran asset Alila Jabal Akhdar became the first development in Oman to be awarded with the Leadership in Energy & Environmental Design (LEED) certification for green building.

=== Local Development Policy ===
Omran's Local Development Policy (LDP) was established in 2012 to ensure that the company's contracting, procurement and supply-chain processes favour Omani businesses and suppliers.

=== Corporate Social Responsibility (CSR) ===
Omran's CSR Initiatives include:

- Intajee - Meaning ‘my product’ in Arabic, Intajee is a program aimed to support the growth of micro-businesses buy assisting local producers to create, package and sell their goods.
- Zaree - Launched in November 2012, Zaree is a program designed to support all female micro-businesses in Wilayat Khasab through the sale of locally produced garments and cuisine.
- Coral Reef - In April 2014, Omran launched the "Together We Protect Marine Life" campaign in Wilayat Khasab, which included beach and coral reef cleaning initiatives and awareness building activities in local schools and communities.
