= Louis Vervaeke =

Belgian bicycle racer

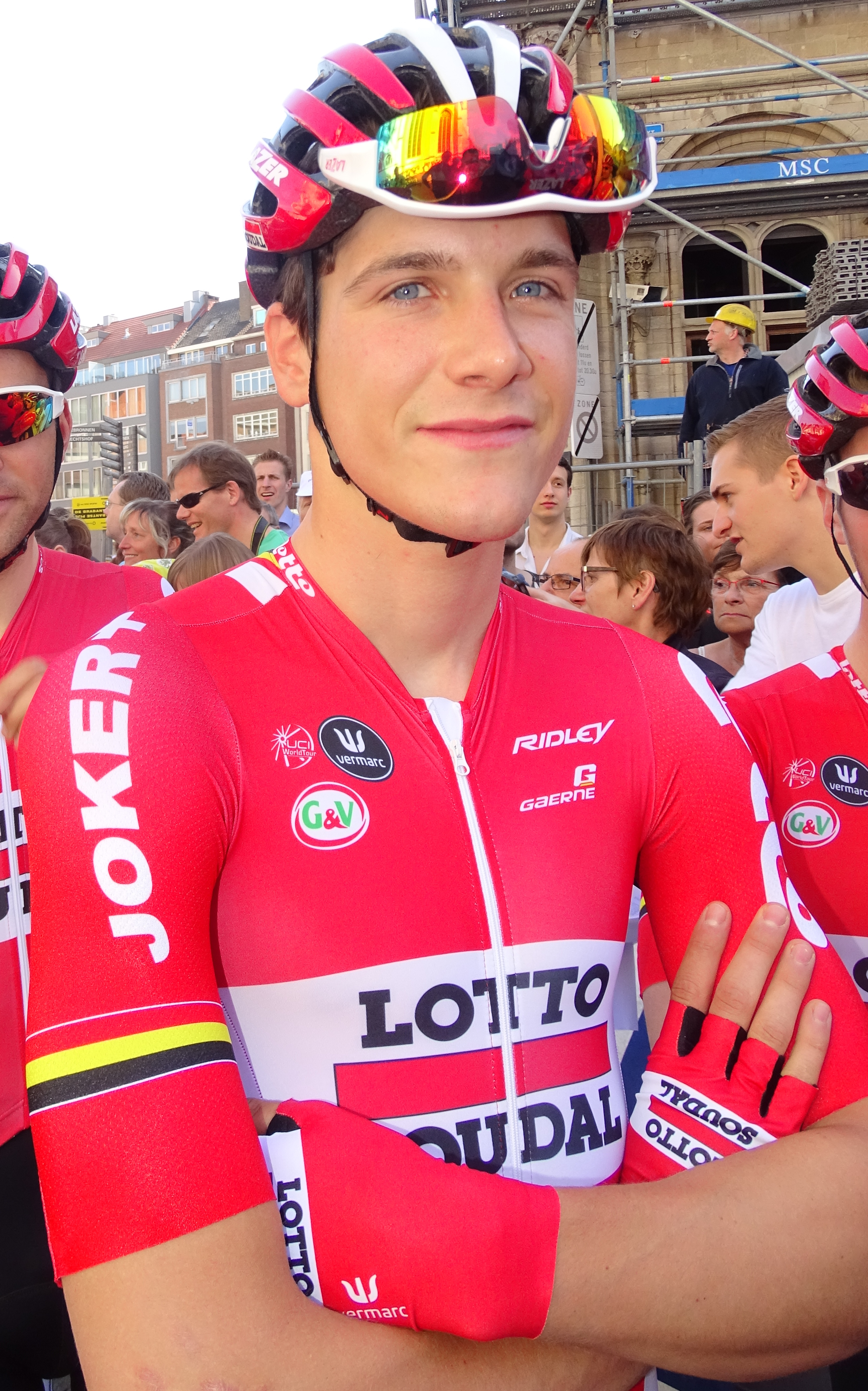
- Vervaeke at the 2015 Brabantse Pijl.

Personal information
- Full name: Louis Vervaeke
- Born: 6 October 1993 (age 33) Ronse, Belgium
- Height: 1.80 m (5 ft 11 in)
- Weight: 65 kg (143 lb; 10.2 st)

Cycling career
- Sport: Cycling
- Current team: Soudal–Quick-Step
- Discipline: Road
- Role: Rider
- Rider type: Climbing specialist

Amateur teams
- 2011: Onder Ons Parike
- 2013–2014: Lotto–Belisol U23

Professional teams
- 2012: Jong Vlaanderen
- 2014–2017: Lotto–Belisol
- 2018–2019: Team Sunweb
- 2020–2021: Alpecin–Fenix
- 2022–: Quick-Step Alpha Vinyl Team

Louis Vervaeke (born 6 October 1993 in Ronse) is a Belgian cyclist, who currently rides for UCI WorldTeam Soudal–Quick-Step. In November 2021 Vervaeke announced that he would be joining Deceuninck–Quick-Step on a two-year deal from 2022, with a role as a climbing domestique for Remco Evenepoel in Grand Tours.

== Major results ==
2011
3rd Overall Grand Prix Rüebliland
2013
4th Overall Tour des Pays de Savoie
4th Overall Giro della Valle d'Aosta
2014
1st Overall Tour des Pays de Savoie

1st Points classification
1st Young rider classification
1st Stage 5

1st Overall Ronde de l'Isard
5th Overall Tour de l'Avenir

1st Stage 7

5th Circuit de Wallonie
5th GP Maurice Raes
2015
1st Sprints classification, Tour of the Basque Country
2017
2nd Trofeo Serra de Tramuntana
4th Trofeo Pollenca–Port de Andratx
2020
8th Gran Trittico Lombardo
2021
1st Mountains classification, Deutschland Tour
2022
10th Overall Tour de la Provence
2023
1st Stage 2 (TTT) UAE Tour
2nd Trofeo Calvia
2025 (1 pro win)
1st Stage 2 Tour of Oman
Combativity award Stage 15 Vuelta a España

=== Grand Tour general classification results timeline ===
Grand Tour	2015	2016	2017	2018	2019	2020	2021	2022	2023	2024
Giro d'Italia	DNF	—	—	DNF	DNF	—	20	—	DNF	—
Tour de France	—	—	—	—	—	—	—	—	—	DNF
Vuelta a España	—	89	—	—	—	—	—	—	33	59

Legend
—	Did not compete
DNF	Did not finish
