= Simon Dalby (cyclist) =

Danish cyclist

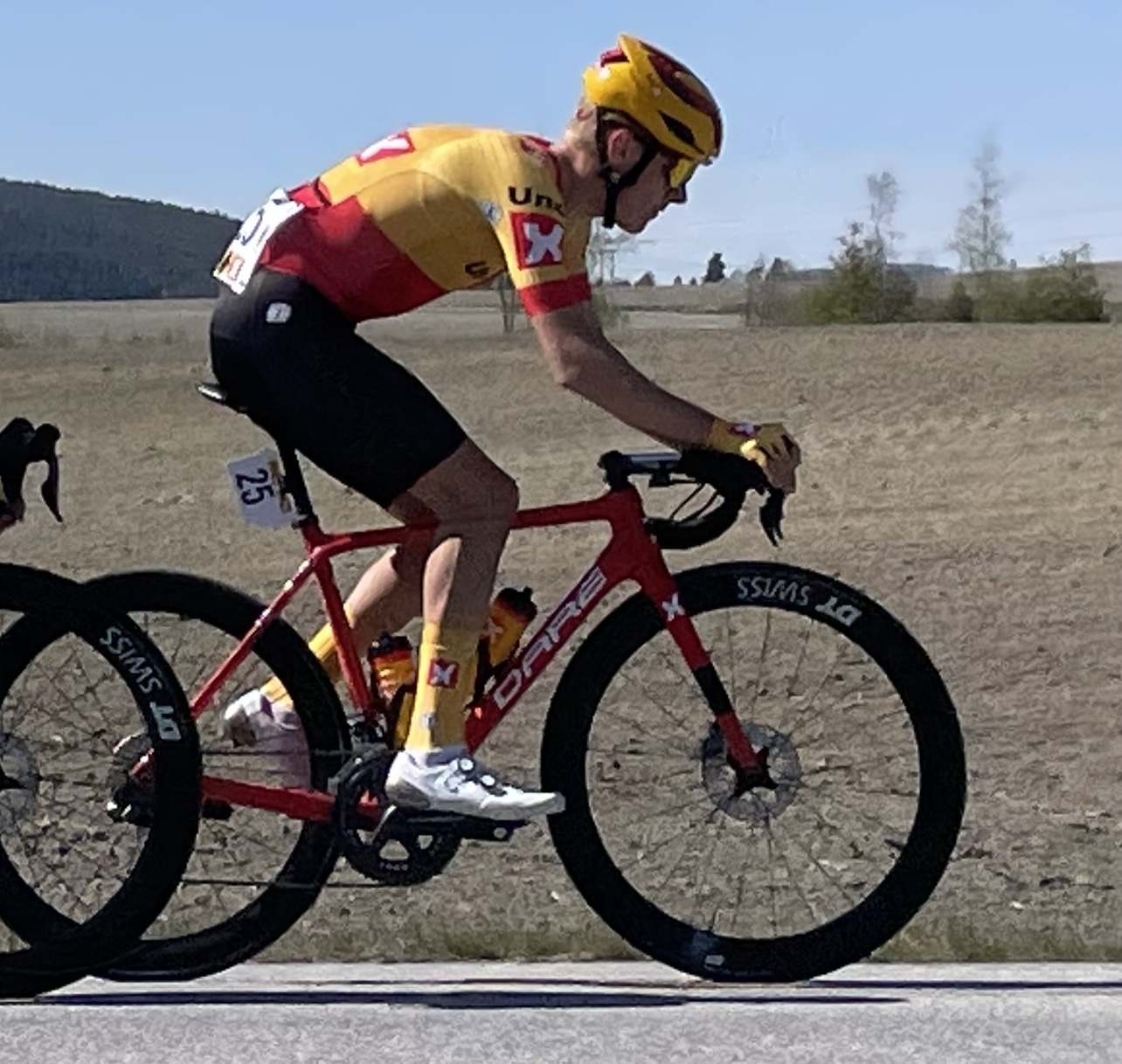
- Dalby in 2022

Personal information
- Full name: Simon Dalby Jensen
- Born: 29 January 2003 (age 23) Holstebro, Denmark

Cycling career
- Sport: Cycling
- Current team: Uno-X Mobility
- Discipline: Road
- Role: Rider

Amateur team
- 2020–2021: Team Mascot Workwear

Professional teams
- 2022–2024: Uno-X Dare Development Team
- 2025–: Uno-X Mobility

Simon Dalby Jensen (born 29 January 2003) is a Danish cyclist, who currently rides for UCI ProTeam Uno-X Mobility.

He took his first UCI race victory on stage two of the 2023 Course de la Paix U23 – Grand Prix Jeseníky, going on to finish second overall.

== Major results ==
2021
5th Overall La Philippe Gilbert juniors
10th Overall Aubel–Thimister–Stavelot
2022
5th Sundvolden GP
2023
1st Stage 3 (TTT) Tour de l'Avenir
2nd Overall Grand Prix Jeseníky

1st Young rider classification
1st Stage 2

7th Sundvolden GP
2024
2nd Sundvolden GP
4th Overall Grand Prix Jeseníky
5th Overall Tour of Antalya
6th Overall Tour de l'Avenir
9th Classic Var
10th Route Adélie
2025
2nd Overall Grand Prix Jeseníky

1st Stage 3

10th Overall Tour of Oman
