= Anton Schiffer =

German bicycle racer

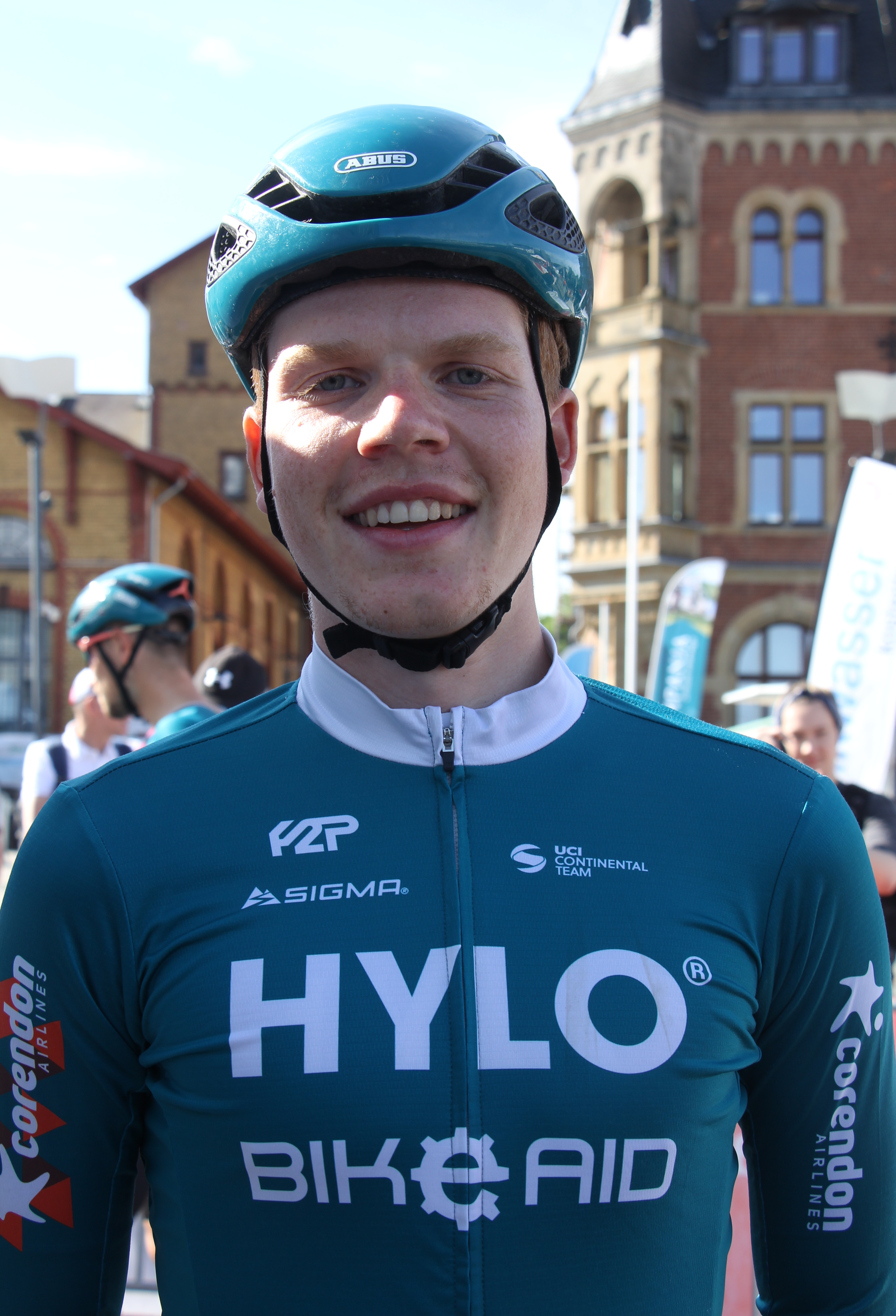
- Schiffer in 2024

Personal information
- Born: 1 September 1999 (age 27) Mühlacker, Germany
- Height: 1.78 m (5 ft 10 in)
- Weight: 62 kg (137 lb)

Cycling career
- Sport: Cycling
- Current team: Visma–Lease a Bike
- Discipline: Road
- Role: Rider
- Rider type: Climber

Amateur teams
- 2022: Pulheimer SC
- 2023: Team Bike Aid Development

Professional teams
- 2023–2025: Bike Aid
- 2025–: Visma–Lease a Bike

Anton Schiffer (born 1 September 1999) is a German cyclist, who currently rides for UCI WorldTeam Visma–Lease a Bike.

Schiffer began his career as a triathete. He entered his first official cycling competitions in 2022, soon achieving good results in amateur races, in addition to having a VO2 Max of 83 ml/min/kg. In January 2023, he joined Team Bike Aid Development. That spring, he finished second in the Zwift Academy, in addition to seventh overall at the Tour of Antalya and winning the mountains classification at the Tour of Hellas. In August, he was promoted to the professional team. In September, he won the German Hill Climb Championships.

In April 2025, he finished second overall at the Tour of Hellas. He took his first professional win in July on stage three of the Sibiu Cycling Tour. In August, it was announced Schiffer would join Visma–Lease a Bike starting in October 2025 until 2027.

== Major results ==
2024
1st National Hill-climb Championships
1st Mountains classification, Tour of Hellas
7th Overall Tour of Antalya
8th Overall Tour de Serbie
2025 (1 pro win)
2nd Overall Tour of Hellas
3rd Road race, National Road Championships
4th Overall Sibiu Cycling Tour

1st Stage 3

2026
5th Overall Settimana Internazionale di Coppi e Bartali
