= Valentin Paret-Peintre =

French cyclist (born 2001)

Personal information
- Born: 14 January 2001 (age 25) Annemasse, France
- Height: 1.76 m (5 ft 9 in)
- Weight: 52 kg (115 lb)

Cycling career
- Sport: Cycling
- Current team: Soudal–Quick-Step
- Discipline: Road
- Role: Rider
- Rider type: Climber

Amateur teams
- 2014–2019: VC Annemasse
- 2018: BTWIN U19 Racing Team
- 2019: Van Rysel–AG2R La Mondiale
- 2020–2021: Chambéry CF

Professional teams
- 2022–2024: AG2R Citroën Team
- 2025–: Soudal–Quick-Step

Major wins
- Grand Tours Tour de France 1 individual stage (2025) Giro d'Italia 1 individual stage (2024)

Valentin Paret-Peintre (French: [valɑ̃tɛ̃ paʁɛ pɛ̃tʁ]; born 14 January 2001) is a French professional road racing cyclist who rides for UCI WorldTeam Soudal–Quick-Step. His older brother Aurélien Paret-Peintre is also a professional cyclist.

A climbing specialist, Paret-Peintre turned professional with AG2R Citroën Team in 2022, and took his first victory the following year at the 2024 Giro d'Italia, winning stage 10 from the breakaway. After moving to Soudal–Quick-Step for the 2025 season, he won the Muscat Classic and a stage of the 2025 Tour of Oman, finishing second overall while securing both the points and young rider classifications. Later that year, he became the first Frenchman in 23 years to win on Mont Ventoux at the 2025 Tour de France, taking stage 16 and delivering the race's first French stage win.

== Early life and amateur career ==
Born in Annemasse, Haute-Savoie, Paret-Peintre grew up in a cycling family; his father Olivier has served as president of Vélo Club Annemasse, and his siblings Aurélien and Maéva also raced. He began competing at around six years old and later rode for VC Annemasse at junior level.

As a junior, Paret-Peintre competed for VC Annemasse and the Van Rysel–AG2R La Mondiale development teams. In 2018, he won the Tour du Pays d'Olliergues and was runner-up at the Classique des Alpes Juniors; that spring he earned France U19 selection and debuted at the Tour du Pays de Vaud.

In 2019, Paret-Peintre won the Classique des Alpes Juniors and took the Auvergne–Rhône–Alpes regional junior road title at Sauvain, although crashes in July and August curtailed the second half of his season.

He joined Chambéry Cyclisme Formation for 2020, taking his first U23 stage win at the Ronde de l'Isard (stage 3 to Ax 3 Domaines) and finishing sixth overall. He subsequently turned professional in 2022 with AG2R Citroën Team.

Paret-Peintre turned professional in 2022 with AG2R Citroën Team. In 2024, he took his first pro win on stage 10 of the Giro d'Italia from the breakaway.

== Professional career ==
=== 2022–25: AG2R ===
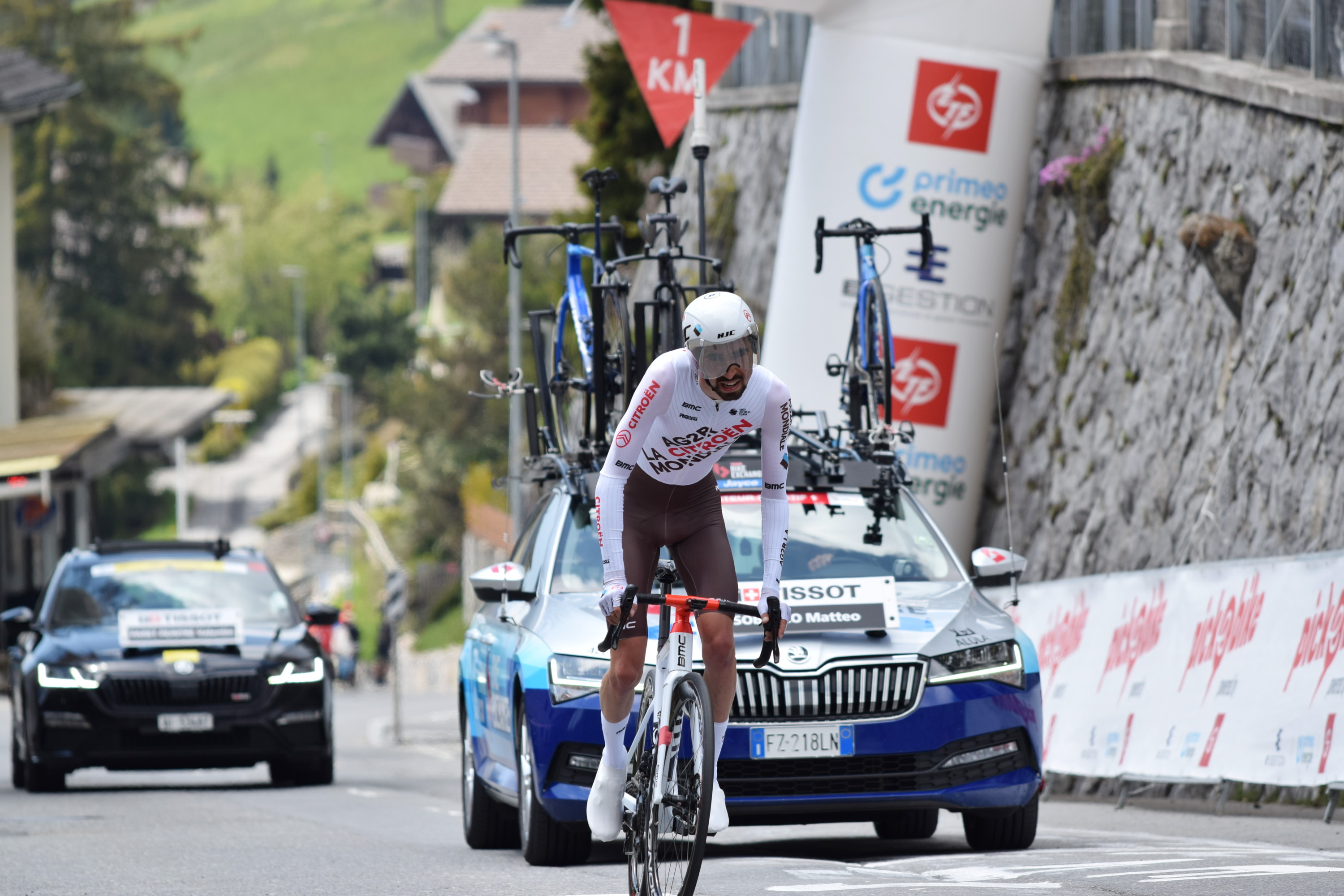
Paret-Peintre at the 2022 Tour de Romandie

In 2022 he joined the AG2R Citroën Team alongside his brother Aurélien. In August 2022 he placed ninth on stage 3 of the 2022 Tour de l'Ain.

In April 2023, after a 150 km breakaway, he finished ninth on stage 5 of the 2023 Tour of the Alps. That May, he rode his first Giro d'Italia, finishing fifth on stage 13 to Crans-Montana. In June he placed eighth at the 2023 Mont Ventoux Dénivelé Challenge.

He opened his 2024 season with an eighth place overall at the 2024 Tour Down Under. As a domestique for Ben O'Connor at the 2024 Tour of the Alps, he finished ninth, fifth and third on stages 3–5 respectively, placing fourth overall, 44 seconds behind winner Juan Pedro López.

In May, he claimed his first professional victory by winning stage 10 of the 2024 Giro d'Italia, soloing to the line ahead of Romain Bardet and Jan Tratnik. Later that season, he made his debut at the Vuelta a España, finishing 45th overall while supporting O'Connor, who placed second on the general classification.

=== 2025–present: Soudal–Quick-Step ===
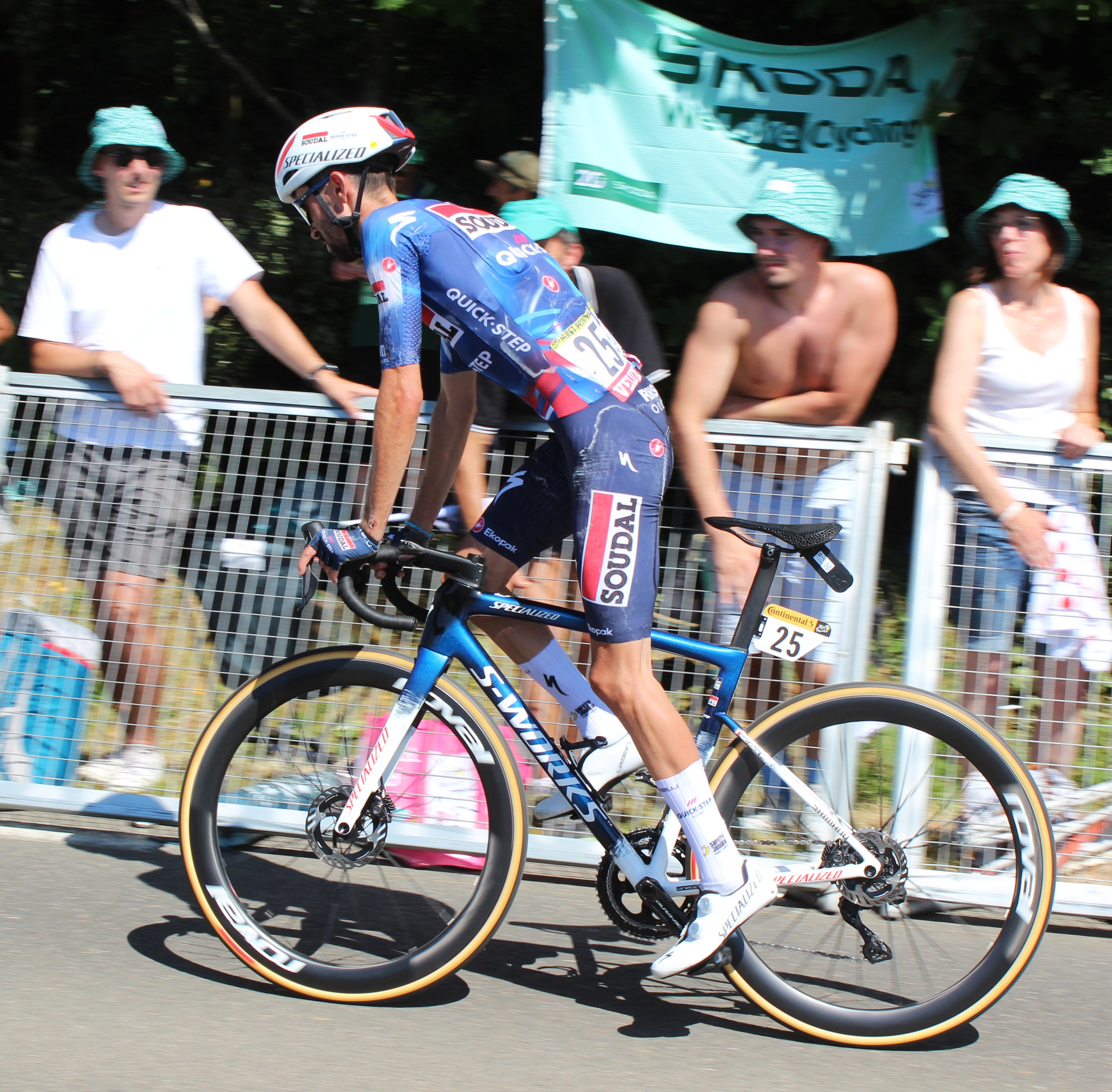
Paret-Peintre at the 2025 Tour de France

On 25 September 2024, it was announced that Paret-Peintre would leave Decathlon–AG2R La Mondiale at the end of the season to join Soudal Quick-Step on a contract through 2026. In the team's announcement he described Quick-Step as a "legendary team" whose history of victories in Paris–Roubaix and the Tour of Flanders had inspired him, adding that he aimed to become a strong climbing domestique and target top-ten finishes in week-long stage races.

Paret-Peintre began his 2025 season in Oman, finishing sixth at the Muscat Classic in the winner's time. At the 2025 Tour of Oman, riding as team leader, he won the decisive final stage to Jebel Akhdar and placed second overall, six seconds behind Adam Yates. He also won the points and young rider classifications.

On 22 July, Paret-Peintre won Stage 16 of the 2025 Tour de France from Montpellier to Mont Ventoux, becoming the first French stage winner of the race and the first Frenchman to win on Ventoux since 2002; he became the fifth French rider to triumph on the climb after Raymond Poulidor (1965), Bernard Thévenet (1972), Jean-François Bernard (1987) and Richard Virenque (2002).

== Major results ==
2018
2nd La Classique des Alpes Juniors
2019
1st La Classique des Alpes Juniors
2020
6th Overall Ronde de l'Isard

1st Stage 3

2021
1st Overall Tour de Moselle
4th Paris–Tours Espoirs
4th Giro del Belvedere
2023
8th Mont Ventoux Dénivelé Challenge
2024 (1 pro win)
1st Stage 10 Giro d'Italia
4th Overall Tour of the Alps
8th Overall Tour Down Under
2025 (2)
1st Stage 16 Tour de France
2nd Overall Tour of Oman

1st Points classification
1st Young rider classification
1st Stage 5

6th Muscat Classic
2026
4th Overall Volta a Catalunya

=== Grand Tour general classification results timeline ===
Grand Tour	2023	2024	2025	2026
Giro d'Italia	37	16	—	—
Tour de France	—	—	41	
Vuelta a España	—	45	DNF	

Legend
—	Did not compete
DNF	Did not finish
