= Hartthijs de Vries =

Dutch cyclist

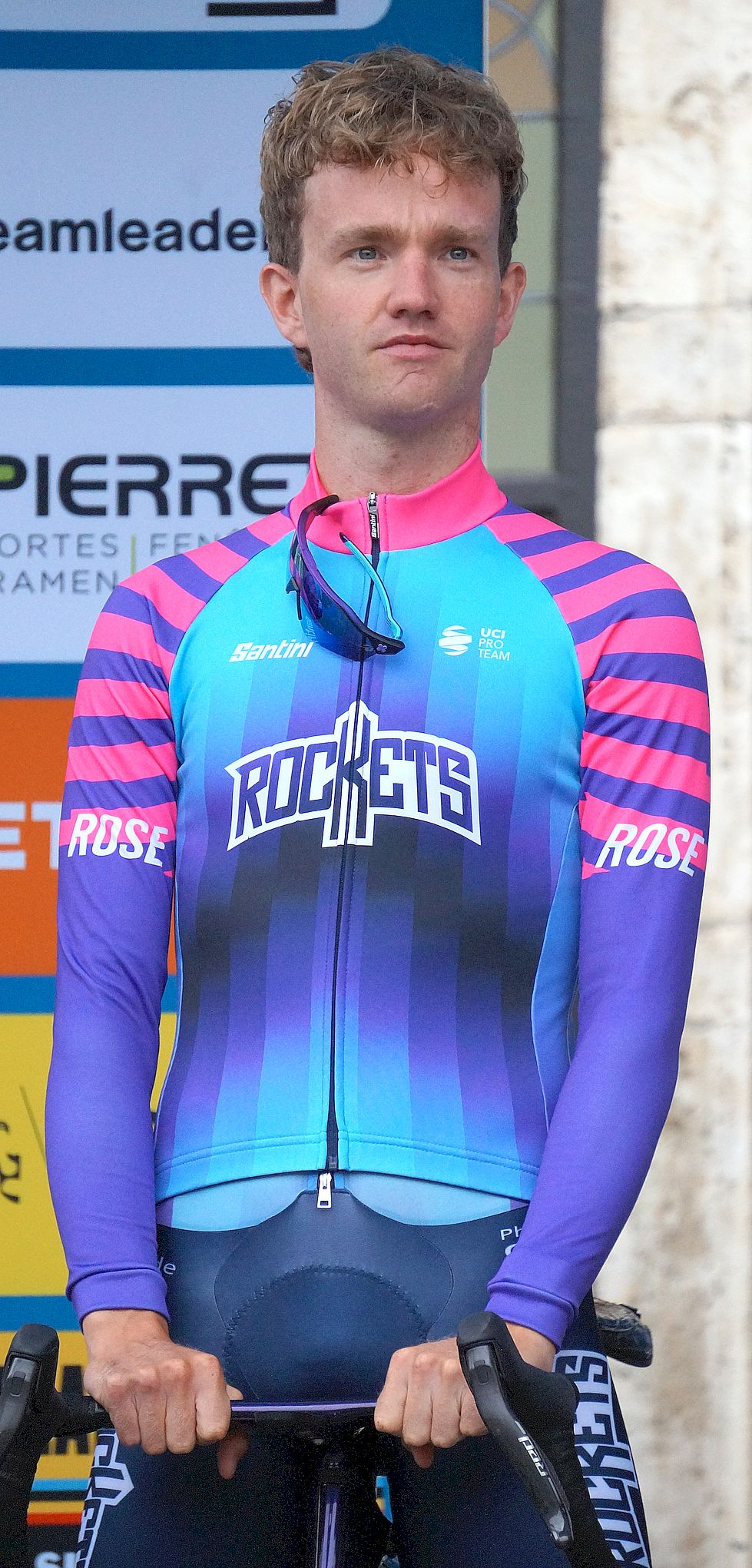
- de Vries in 2026

Personal information
- Born: 11 July 1996 (age 30) Kollum, Netherlands
- Height: 1.84 m (6 ft 0 in)
- Weight: 66 kg (146 lb)

Cycling career
- Sport: Cycling
- Current team: Unibet Rose Rockets
- Discipline: Road
- Role: Rider

Amateur team
- 2018: NWV Groningen

Professional teams
- 2015–2016: Rabobank Development Team
- 2017: SEG Racing Academy
- 2019–2020: Vlasman Cycling Team
- 2021–2022: Metec–Solarwatt p/b Mantel
- 2023–: TDT–Unibet Cycling Team

Hartthijs de Vries (born 11 July 1996) is a Dutch cyclist, who currently rides for UCI ProTeam Unibet Rose Rockets.

In September 2017, he signed a two-year professional contract with Roompot–Nederlandse Loterij. However, before the season began he was forced to surrender his contract due to cardiac arrhythmias. He instead joined club team NWV Groningen, where he was able to make a comeback and secure a stagiaire spot on UCI WorldTeam LottoNL–Jumbo. However, this was waived.

== Major results ==
2014
5th Overall Aubel–Thimister–La Gleize
2015
6th Grand Prix de la ville de Pérenchies
2016
3rd Overall Olympia's Tour
10th Ronde van Overijssel
2017
National Under-23 Road Championships

3rd Road race
4th Time trial

4th Paris–Tours Espoirs
5th Kattekoers
8th Gooikse Pijl
2018
1st Time trial, National Under-23 Road Championships
2021
4th Ronde van de Achterhoek
10th Overall Tour de la Mirabelle
2022
1st Points classification, Alpes Isère Tour
2nd Midden-Brabant Poort Omloop
4th Ronde van Overijssel
5th PWZ Zuidenveld Tour
5th Visit Friesland Elfsteden Race
6th Districtenpijl - Ekeren-Deurne
8th Overall Ronde de l'Oise
2023
1st Overall Kreiz Breizh Elites
5th Egmont Cycling Race
5th Grand Prix Herning
6th Visit Friesland Elfsteden Race
10th Overall ZLM Tour
2024 (1 pro win)
3rd Dwars door het Hageland
8th Overall Tour of Antalya

1st Stage 4

2025
8th Overall Tour of Holland
