= Axel Huens =

French cyclist (born 2001)

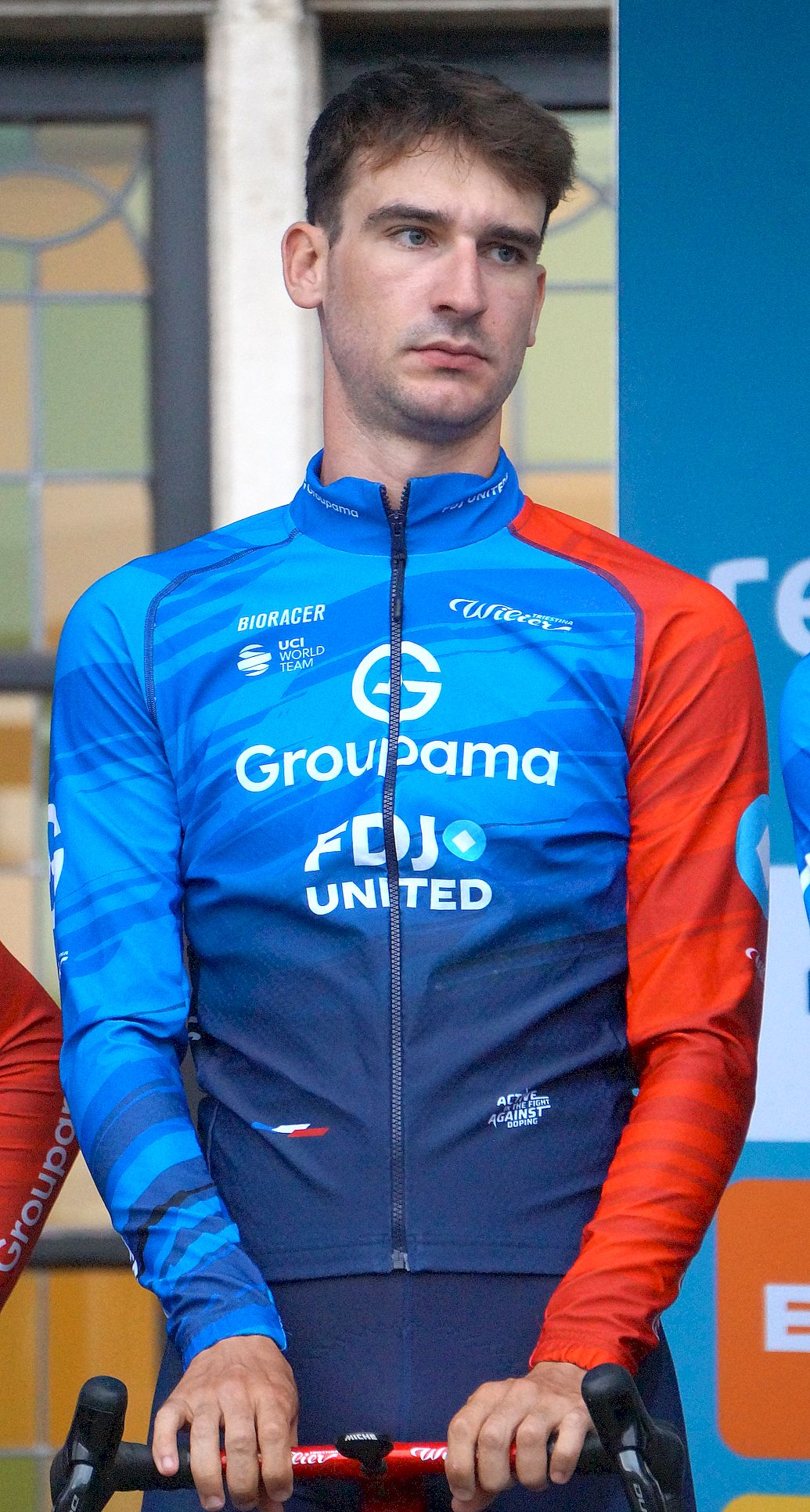
- Huens in 2026

Personal information
- Born: 5 September 2001 (age 25) Buire-Courcelles, France

Cycling career
- Sport: Cycling
- Current team: Groupama–FDJ United
- Discipline: Road
- Role: Rider

Amateur teams
- 2018–2019: OGS U19 Cycling Team
- 2020–2021: VC Rouen 76
- 2022: Dunkerque Grand Littoral Cyclisme

Professional teams
- 2023: Circus–ReUz–Technord
- 2024–2025: TDT–Unibet Cycling Team
- 2026–: Groupama–FDJ United

Axel Huens (born 5 September 2001) is a French road cyclist, who rides for UCI WorldTeam Groupama–FDJ United.

== Major results ==
2018
1st Stage 2b Tour des Portes du Pays d'Othe
3rd Keizer der Juniores
7th Menen–Kemmel–Menen
2019
1st Johan Museeuw Classic
4th Trofee van Vlaanderen
5th E3 BinckBank Classic Junioren
10th Overall Keizer der Juniores
10th GP Luxembourg
2021
8th Grand Prix de la Somme
2023
2nd Brussel–Opwijk
3rd Road race, National Under-23 Road Championships
3rd Grand Prix de la Somme
4th Paris–Tours Espoirs
5th Gent–Wevelgem U23
5th Memorial Philippe Van Coningsloo
6th Dorpenomloop Rucphen
10th Grand Prix Cerami
2024
5th Coppa Sabatini
6th Overall Kreiz Breizh Elites
7th Famenne Ardenne Classic
2025
8th Binche–Chimay–Binche
9th Grand Prix Criquielion
10th Grand Prix d'Isbergues
2026
7th Grand Prix de Denain
10th Flandrien 0.0 Classic
