= Oman Convention and Exhibition Centre =

- Location within Oman

General information
- Type: Convention and Exhibition Centre
- Architectural style: Islamic architecture
- Location: Muscat, Oman
- Coordinates: 23.5681702°N 58.3219381°E
- Construction started: 2013
- Completed: 2016
- Client: Oman Tourism Development Company

Design and construction
- Architecture firm: SSH
- Main contractor: Carillion Alawi (Phase 1); Shapoorji Pallonji and Oman Shapoorji Company (Phase 2)

Website
- www.omanconvention.com

The Oman Convention and Exhibition Centre is a major business and tourism facility owned and developed by the Oman Tourism Development Company and located in the Seeb area of Capital city Muscat, Oman.

== History ==
The first phase of the project, which includes the exhibition halls designed by SSH and built by Carillion Alawi, opened in June 2016. There are five exhibition halls which in total provide 22,000 sq m of exhibition space.

The second phase, which includes the convention centre itself being built by a joint venture between Shapoorji Pallonji and Oman Shapoorji Company, is due to open in June 2018. The convention centre has an auditorium which can accommodate 3,200 people and a theatre which can host 450 people.

The complex also includes a Crowne Plaza hotel which opened in December 2017 and a JW Marriott hotel which is expected to open in June 2018.
