= Tour of Antalya =

Turkish multi-day road cycling race

Race details
- Date: February
- Discipline: Road
- Competition: UCI Europe Tour
- Type: Stage race
- Web site: tourofantalya.com

History
- First edition: 2018
- Editions: 6 (as of 2026)
- First winner: Artem Ovechkin (RUS)
- Most wins: No repeat winners
- Most recent: Henrique Bravo (BRA)

The Tour of Antalya is a multi-day road cycling race held annually in Turkey. It is part of UCI Europe Tour in category 2.1. The first two editions were category 2.2, before upgrading in 2020.

== Winners ==
Year	Country	Rider	Team
2018	Russia	Artem Ovechkin	Marathon–Tula
2019	Poland	Szymon Rekita	Leopard Pro Cycling
2020	Great Britain	Max Stedman	Canyon dhb p/b Soreen
2021	No race due to the COVID-19 pandemic		
2022	Denmark	Jacob Hindsgaul Madsen	Uno-X Pro Cycling Team
2023	No race due to the 2023 Turkey–Syria earthquake		
2024	Italy	Davide Piganzoli	Team Polti Kometa
2025	No race		
2026	Brazil	Henrique Bravo	Soudal–Quick-Step Devo Team

== Classifications ==
The jerseys worn by the leaders of the individual classifications are:

- Pink Jersey – Worn by the leader of the general classification.
- Yellow Jersey – Worn by the leader of the points classification.
- Orange Jersey – Worn by the leader of the climber classification.
- Green Jersey – Worn by the sprinter who leads the Green Future Prime classification.
