= Bimmah Sinkhole =

Sinkhole in Oman

Coordinates: 23°02′10″N 59°04′19″E

Hawiyyat Najm (Arabic: هوية نجم), known as Bimmah Sinkhole in English, is a water-filled depression, structurally a sinkhole, in the limestone of eastern Muscat Governorate in the Sultanate of Oman, very close to the Al Sharqiyah region just off the highway to Sur, few kilometers before Tiwi.

== Location ==
To preserve the sinkhole, the local municipality developed a fenced and toilet-equipped park, Hawiyat Najm Park, around it, along with a stairway leading down to the hole.

== Geology ==
A lake of turquoise waters, it is 50 m by 70 m wide and approximately 20 m deep. It is only about 600 m away from the sea, between the coastal towns of Ḑibāb and Bamah (Bimmah). The sinkhole was formed by a collapse of the surface layer due to dissolution of the underlying limestone. However, locals used to believe this sinkhole in the shape of a water well was created by a meteorite, hence the Arabic name Hawiyyat Najm which means "the deep well of the (falling) star".

Bimmah Sinkhole ranges in depth from only a few feet to over 300+ feet in the deepest part.

== Gallery ==
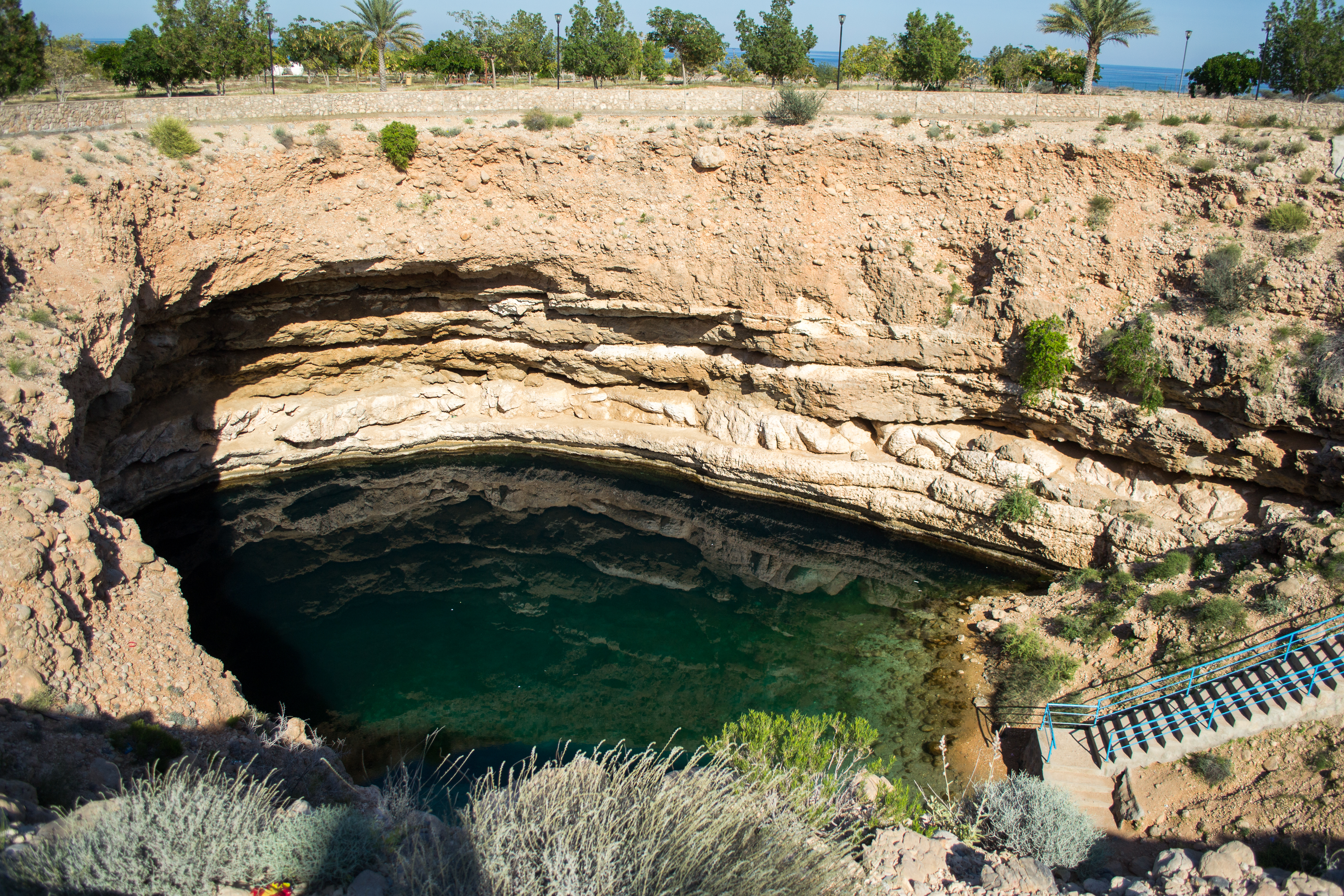
Bimmah Sinkhole

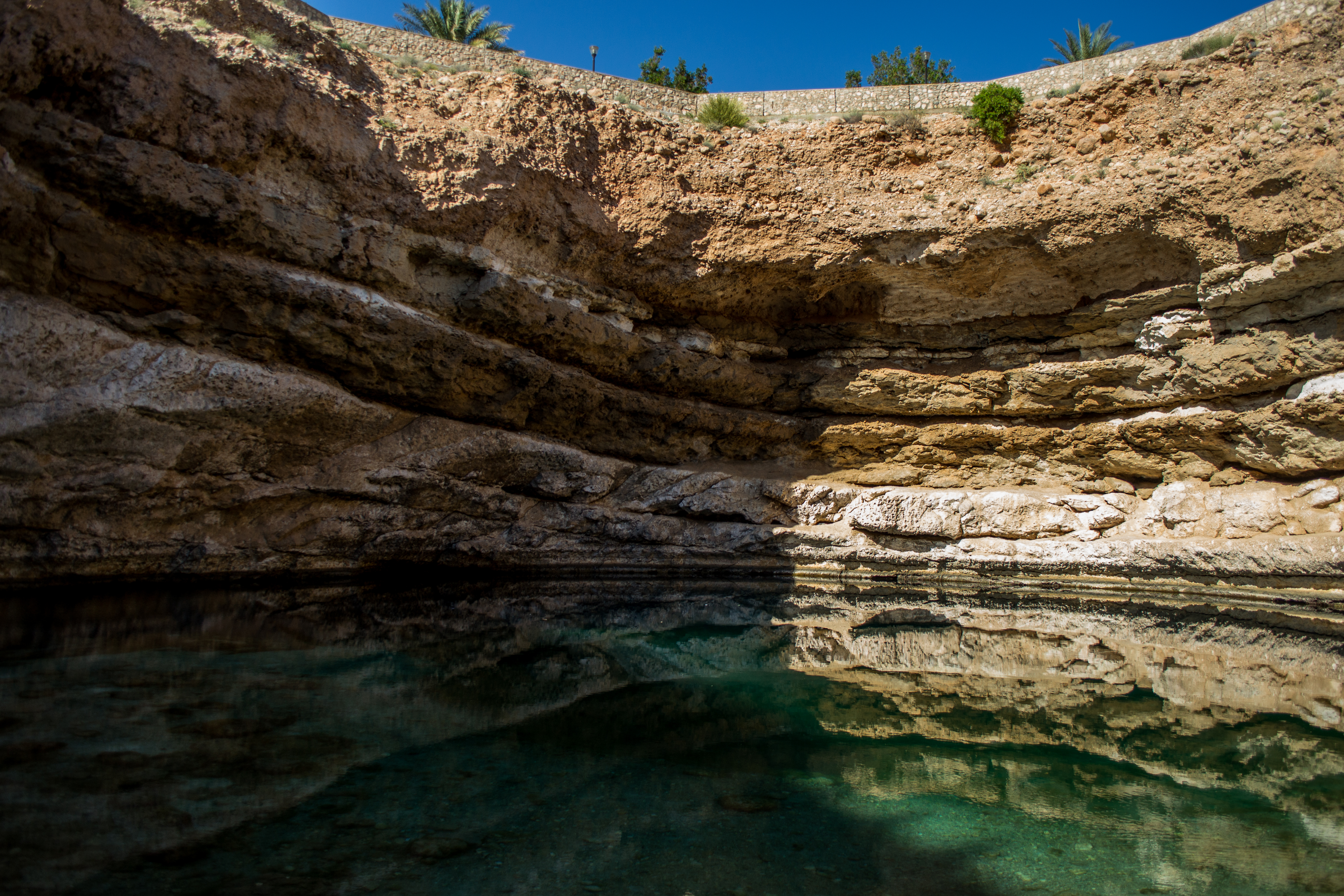
Inside the Bimmah Sinkhole

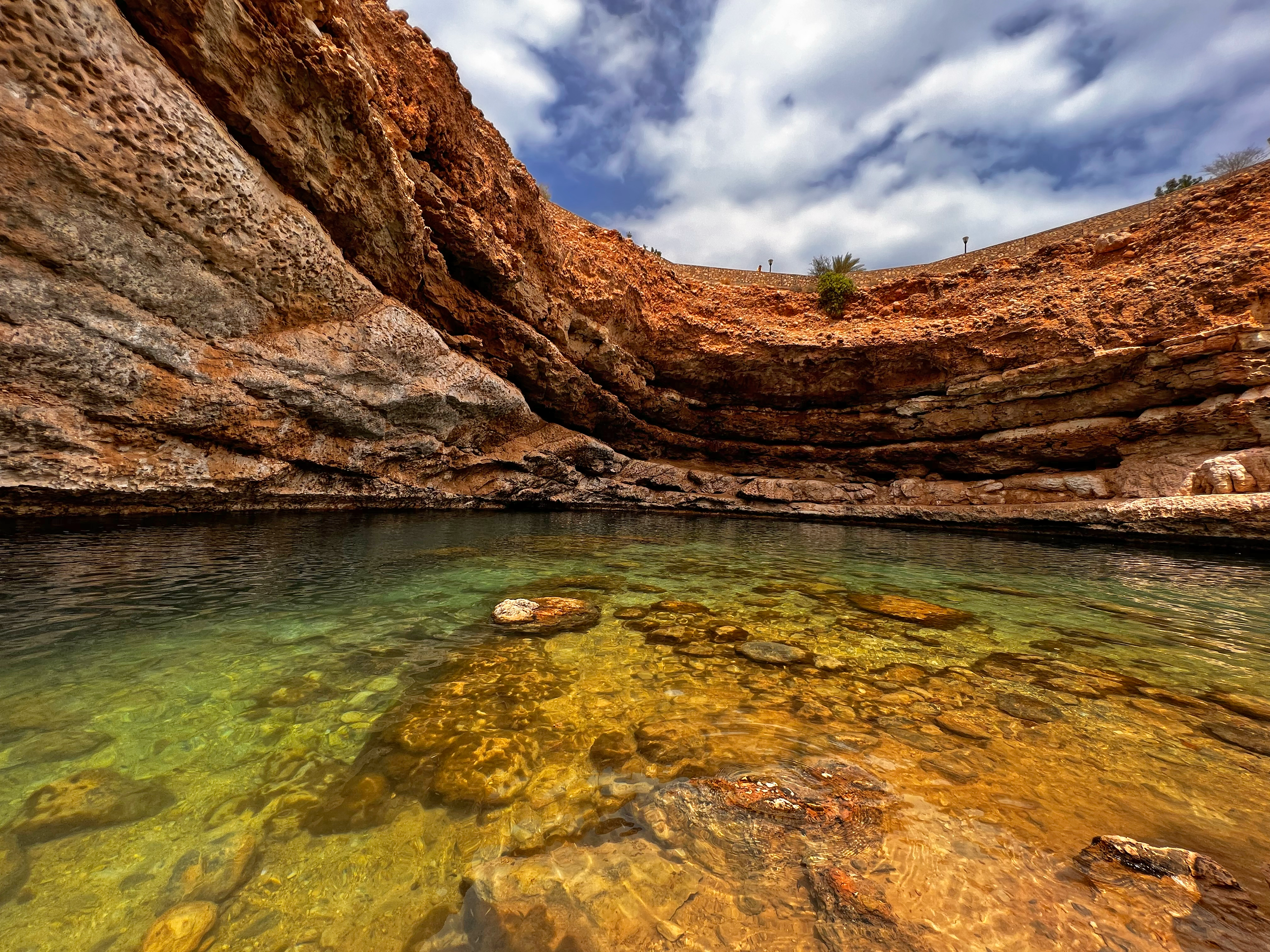
Hawiyet Najm
