= List of teams and cyclists in the 2022 Giro d'Italia =

List of cyclists

The following is a list of teams and cyclists who took part in the 2022 Giro d'Italia.

== Teams ==
UCI WorldTeams

- AG2R Citroën Team
- Astana Qazaqstan Team
- Bora–Hansgrohe
- Cofidis
- EF Education–EasyPost
- Groupama–FDJ
- Ineos Grenadiers
- Intermarché–Wanty–Gobert Matériaux
- Israel–Premier Tech
- Lotto–Soudal
- Movistar Team
- Quick-Step Alpha Vinyl Team
- Team Bahrain Victorious
- Team BikeExchange–Jayco
- Team DSM
- Team Jumbo–Visma
- Trek–Segafredo
- UAE Team Emirates

UCI ProTeams

- Alpecin–Fenix
- Bardiani–CSF–Faizanè
- Drone Hopper–Androni Giocattoli
- Eolo–Kometa

== Cyclists ==
Legend
No.	Starting number worn by the rider during the Giro
Pos.	Position in the general classification
Time	Deficit to the winner of the general classification
†	Denotes riders born on or after 1 January 1997 eligible for the young rider classification
General classification	Denotes the winner of the general classification
Points classification	Denotes the winner of the points classification
Mountains classification	Denotes the winner of the mountains classification
Young rider classification	Denotes the winner of the young rider classification (eligibility indicated by †)
Combativity award	Denotes the winner of the combativity award
DNS	Denotes a rider who did not start a stage, followed by the stage before which he withdrew
DNF	Denotes a rider who did not finish a stage, followed by the stage in which he withdrew
DSQ	Denotes a rider who was disqualified from the race, followed by the stage in which this occurred
HD	Denotes a rider finished outside the time limit, followed by the stage in which they did so
COV	Denotes a rider who withdrawn because of COVID-19 either because he tested positive or team members tested positive, followed by the stage before which he withdrew
Ages correct as of Friday 6 May 2022, the date on which the Giro began

=== By starting number ===
No.	Name	Nationality	Team	Age	Pos.	Time	Ref.
1	Richard Carapaz	Ecuador	Ineos Grenadiers	28	2	+ 1' 18"	
2	Jonathan Castroviejo	Spain	Ineos Grenadiers	35	64	+ 3h 24' 18"	
3	Jhonatan Narváez †	Ecuador	Ineos Grenadiers	25	42	+ 2h 37' 05"	
4	Richie Porte	Australia	Ineos Grenadiers	37	DNF-19	–	
5	Salvatore Puccio	Italy	Ineos Grenadiers	32	85	+ 4h 14' 36"	
6	Pavel Sivakov †	France	Ineos Grenadiers	24	16	+ 41' 43"	
7	Ben Swift	Great Britain	Ineos Grenadiers	34	66	+ 3h 27' 26"	
8	Ben Tulett †	Great Britain	Ineos Grenadiers	20	38	+ 2h 27' 26"	
11	Andrea Vendrame	Italy	AG2R Citroën Team	27	55	+ 3h 10' 26"	
12	Lilian Calmejane	France	AG2R Citroën Team	29	86	+ 4h 17' 30"	
13	Mikaël Cherel	France	AG2R Citroën Team	36	23	+ 1h 22' 20"	
14	Felix Gall †	Austria	AG2R Citroën Team	24	50	+ 2h 58' 05"	
15	Jaakko Hänninen †	Finland	AG2R Citroën Team	25	90	+ 4h 32' 32"	
16	Lawrence Naesen	Belgium	AG2R Citroën Team	29	124	+ 5h 45' 54"	
17	Nans Peters	France	AG2R Citroën Team	28	58	+ 3h 16' 00"	
18	Nicolas Prodhomme †	France	AG2R Citroën Team	25	65	+ 3h 27' 00"	
21	Mathieu van der Poel	Netherlands	Alpecin–Fenix	27	57	+ 3h 14' 39"	
22	Tobias Bayer †	Austria	Alpecin–Fenix	22	100	+ 4h 57' 16"	
23	Dries De Bondt	Belgium	Alpecin–Fenix	30	109	+ 5h 17' 20"	
24	Alexander Krieger	Germany	Alpecin–Fenix	30	DNS-14	–	
25	Senne Leysen	Belgium	Alpecin–Fenix	26	118	+ 5h 38' 59"	
26	Jakub Mareczko	Italy	Alpecin–Fenix	28	DNF-4	–	
27	Stefano Oldani †	Italy	Alpecin–Fenix	24	84	+ 4h 13' 50"	
28	Oscar Riesebeek	Netherlands	Alpecin–Fenix	29	113	+ 5h 27' 57"	
31	Vincenzo Nibali	Italy	Astana Qazaqstan Team	37	4	+ 9' 02"	
32	Valerio Conti	Italy	Astana Qazaqstan Team	29	DNF-15	–	
33	David de la Cruz	Spain	Astana Qazaqstan Team	33	DNF-20	–	
34	Joe Dombrowski	United States	Astana Qazaqstan Team	30	22	+ 1h 12' 21"	
35	Fabio Felline	Italy	Astana Qazaqstan Team	32	41	+ 2h 36' 40"	
36	Miguel Ángel López	Colombia	Astana Qazaqstan Team	28	DNF-4	–	
37	Vadim Pronskiy †	Kazakhstan	Astana Qazaqstan Team	23	29	+ 2h 03' 10"	
38	Harold Tejada †	Colombia	Astana Qazaqstan Team	25	56	+ 3h 12' 38"	
41	Mikel Landa	Spain	Team Bahrain Victorious	32	3	+ 3' 24"	
42	Phil Bauhaus	Germany	Team Bahrain Victorious	27	138	+ 6h 20' 13"	
43	Pello Bilbao	Spain	Team Bahrain Victorious	32	5	+ 9' 14"	
44	Santiago Buitrago †	Colombia	Team Bahrain Victorious	22	12	+ 24' 23"	
45	Domen Novak	Slovenia	Team Bahrain Victorious	26	31	+ 2h 08' 46"	
46	Wout Poels	Netherlands	Team Bahrain Victorious	34	34	+ 2h 15' 18"	
47	Jasha Sütterlin	Germany	Team Bahrain Victorious	29	87	+ 4h 23' 10"	
48	Jan Tratnik	Slovenia	Team Bahrain Victorious	32	DNF-3	–	
51	Filippo Zana †	Italy	Bardiani–CSF–Faizanè	23	47	+ 2h 53' 56"	
52	Luca Covili †	Italy	Bardiani–CSF–Faizanè	25	24	+ 1h 30' 24"	
53	Filippo Fiorelli	Italy	Bardiani–CSF–Faizanè	27	DNF-5	–	
54	Davide Gabburo	Italy	Bardiani–CSF–Faizanè	29	53	+ 3h 09' 09"	
55	Sacha Modolo	Italy	Bardiani–CSF–Faizanè	34	114	+ 5h 28' 00"	
56	Luca Rastelli †	Italy	Bardiani–CSF–Faizanè	22	106	+ 5h 12' 56"	
57	Alessandro Tonelli	Italy	Bardiani–CSF–Faizanè	29	52	+ 3h 04' 45"	
58	Samuele Zoccarato †	Italy	Bardiani–CSF–Faizanè	24	DNF-7	–	
61	Wilco Kelderman	Netherlands	Bora–Hansgrohe	31	17	+ 41' 45"	
62	Giovanni Aleotti †	Italy	Bora–Hansgrohe	22	72	+ 3h 48' 32"	
63	Cesare Benedetti	Poland	Bora–Hansgrohe	34	120	+ 5h 41' 28"	
64	Emanuel Buchmann	Germany	Bora–Hansgrohe	29	7	+ 13' 19"	
65	Patrick Gamper †	Austria	Bora–Hansgrohe	25	108	+ 5h 13' 44"	
66	Jai Hindley	Australia	Bora–Hansgrohe	26	1	86h 31' 14"	
67	Lennard Kämna	Germany	Bora–Hansgrohe	25	19	+ 43' 58"	
68	Ben Zwiehoff	Germany	Bora–Hansgrohe	28	51	+ 2h 59' 37"	
71	Guillaume Martin	France	Cofidis	28	14	+ 28' 37"	
72	Davide Cimolai	Italy	Cofidis	32	135	+ 6h 16' 34"	
73	Simone Consonni	Italy	Cofidis	27	121	+ 5h 41' 36"	
74	Wesley Kreder	Netherlands	Cofidis	31	139	+ 6h 22' 10"	
75	Anthony Perez	France	Cofidis	31	88	+ 4h 26' 42"	
76	Pierre-Luc Périchon	France	Cofidis	35	94	+ 4h 43' 55"	
77	Rémy Rochas	France	Cofidis	25	71	+ 3h 46' 28"	
78	Davide Villella	Italy	Cofidis	30	63	+ 3h 23' 54"	
81	Natnael Tesfatsion †	Eritrea	Drone Hopper–Androni Giocattoli	22	DNF-16	–	
82	Mattia Bais	Italy	Drone Hopper–Androni Giocattoli	25	82	+ 4h 12' 26"	
83	Jefferson Alexander Cepeda †	Ecuador	Drone Hopper–Androni Giocattoli	23	DNS-19	–	
84	Andrii Ponomar †	Ukraine	Drone Hopper–Androni Giocattoli	19	117	+ 5h 33' 47"	
85	Simone Ravanelli	Italy	Drone Hopper–Androni Giocattoli	26	91	+ 4h 32' 42"	
86	Eduardo Sepúlveda	Argentina	Drone Hopper–Androni Giocattoli	30	76	+ 3h 54' 40"	
87	Filippo Tagliani	Italy	Drone Hopper–Androni Giocattoli	26	143	+ 6h 29' 04"	
88	Edoardo Zardini	Italy	Drone Hopper–Androni Giocattoli	32	78	+ 4h 03' 18"	
91	Hugh Carthy	Great Britain	EF Education–EasyPost	27	9	+ 17' 54"	
92	Jonathan Kléver Caicedo	Ecuador	EF Education–EasyPost	29	DNS-16	–	
93	Diego Andrés Camargo †	Colombia	EF Education–EasyPost	24	79	+ 4h 05' 46"	
94	Simon Carr †	Great Britain	EF Education–EasyPost	23	DNS-8	–	
95	Magnus Cort	Denmark	EF Education–EasyPost	29	95	+ 4h 44' 51"	
96	Owain Doull	Great Britain	EF Education–EasyPost	29	DNF-7	–	
97	Merhawi Kudus	Eritrea	EF Education–EasyPost	28	61	+ 3h 19' 16"	
98	Julius van den Berg	Netherlands	EF Education–EasyPost	25	140	+ 6h 24' 30"	
101	Lorenzo Fortunato	Italy	Eolo–Kometa	25	15	+ 33' 15"	
102	Vincenzo Albanese	Italy	Eolo–Kometa	25	68	+ 3h 35' 53"	
103	Davide Bais †	Italy	Eolo–Kometa	24	125	+ 5h 47' 49"	
104	Erik Fetter †	Hungary	Eolo–Kometa	22	83	+ 4h 12' 51"	
105	Francesco Gavazzi	Italy	Eolo–Kometa	37	67	+ 3h 35' 13"	
106	Mirco Maestri	Italy	Eolo–Kometa	30	96	+ 4h 45' 59"	
107	Samuele Rivi †	Italy	Eolo–Kometa	23	126	+ 5h 48' 28"	
109	Diego Rosa	Italy	Eolo–Kometa	33	77	+ 3h 58' 26"	
111	Arnaud Démare	France	Groupama–FDJ	30	130	+ 5h 54' 06"	
112	Clément Davy †	France	Groupama–FDJ	23	144	+ 6 34' 20"	
113	Jacopo Guarnieri	Italy	Groupama–FDJ	34	136	+ 6h 16' 35"	
114	Ignatas Konovalovas	Lithuania	Groupama–FDJ	36	115	+ 5h 30' 15"	
115	Tobias Ludvigsson	Sweden	Groupama–FDJ	31	102	+ 5h 02' 16"	
116	Miles Scotson	Australia	Groupama–FDJ	28	127	+ 5h 48' 32"	
117	Ramon Sinkeldam	Netherlands	Groupama–FDJ	33	132	+ 6h 01' 25"	
118	Attila Valter †	Hungary	Groupama–FDJ	23	35	+ 2h 15' 53"	
121	Biniam Girmay †	Eritrea	Intermarché–Wanty–Gobert Matériaux	22	DNS-11	–	
122	Aimé De Gendt	Belgium	Intermarché–Wanty–Gobert Matériaux	27	105	+ 5h 03' 53"	
123	Jan Hirt	Czechia	Intermarché–Wanty–Gobert Matériaux	31	6	+ 9' 28"	
124	Barnabás Peák †	Hungary	Intermarché–Wanty–Gobert Matériaux	23	110	+ 5h 19' 47"	
125	Domenico Pozzovivo	Italy	Intermarché–Wanty–Gobert Matériaux	39	8	+ 17' 29"	
126	Lorenzo Rota	Italy	Intermarché–Wanty–Gobert Matériaux	26	32	+ 2h 09' 53"	
127	Rein Taaramäe	Estonia	Intermarché–Wanty–Gobert Matériaux	35	46	+ 2h 51' 22"	
128	Loïc Vliegen	Belgium	Intermarché–Wanty–Gobert Matériaux	28	DNF-16	–	
131	Giacomo Nizzolo	Italy	Israel–Premier Tech	33	DNS-14	–	
132	Jenthe Biermans	Belgium	Israel–Premier Tech	26	123	+ 5h 42' 24"	
133	Matthias Brändle	Austria	Israel–Premier Tech	32	147	+ 6h 52' 52"	
134	Alexander Cataford	Canada	Israel–Premier Tech	28	101	+ 5h 01' 44"	
135	Alessandro De Marchi	Italy	Israel–Premier Tech	35	92	+ 4h 34' 50"	
136	Alex Dowsett	Great Britain	Israel–Premier Tech	33	134	+ 6h 10' 38"	
137	Reto Hollenstein	Switzerland	Israel–Premier Tech	36	129	+ 5h 51' 25"	
138	Rick Zabel	Germany	Israel–Premier Tech	28	137	+ 6h 19' 48"	
141	Tom Dumoulin	Netherlands	Team Jumbo–Visma	31	DNF-14	–	
142	Edoardo Affini	Italy	Team Jumbo–Visma	25	97	+ 4h 48' 11"	
143	Koen Bouwman	Netherlands	Team Jumbo–Visma	28	21	+ 1h 06' 03"	
144	Pascal Eenkhoorn †	Netherlands	Team Jumbo–Visma	25	62	+ 3h 21' 01"	
145	Tobias Foss †	Norway	Team Jumbo–Visma	24	54	+ 3h 09' 19"	
146	Gijs Leemreize †	Netherlands	Team Jumbo–Visma	22	28	+ 1h 59' 40"	
147	Sam Oomen	Netherlands	Team Jumbo–Visma	26	20	+ 1h 04' 22"	
148	Jos van Emden	Netherlands	Team Jumbo–Visma	37	89	+ 4h 31' 35"	
151	Caleb Ewan	Australia	Lotto–Soudal	27	DNS-12	–	
152	Thomas De Gendt	Belgium	Lotto–Soudal	35	74	+ 3h 49' 52"	
153	Matthew Holmes	Great Britain	Lotto–Soudal	28	116	+ 5h 33' 05"	
154	Roger Kluge	Germany	Lotto–Soudal	36	149	+ 7h 13' 57"	
155	Sylvain Moniquet †	Belgium	Lotto–Soudal	24	48	+ 2h 54' 15"	
156	Michael Schwarzmann	Germany	Lotto–Soudal	31	133	+ 6h 08' 22"	
157	Rüdiger Selig	Germany	Lotto–Soudal	33	DNF-9	–	
158	Harm Vanhoucke †	Belgium	Lotto–Soudal	24	DNF-17	–	
161	Alejandro Valverde	Spain	Movistar Team	42	11	+ 23' 24"	
162	Jorge Arcas	Spain	Movistar Team	29	60	+ 3h 18' 44"	
163	Will Barta	United States	Movistar Team	26	59	+ 3h 16' 57"	
164	Oier Lazkano †	Spain	Movistar Team	22	98	+ 4h 52' 44"	
165	Antonio Pedrero	Spain	Movistar Team	30	27	+ 1h 50' 13"	
166	José Joaquín Rojas	Spain	Movistar Team	36	69	+ 3h 37' 21"	
167	Sergio Samitier	Spain	Movistar Team	26	DNF-7	–	
168	Iván Ramiro Sosa †	Colombia	Movistar Team	24	49	+ 2h 55' 35"	
171	Mark Cavendish	Great Britain	Quick-Step Alpha Vinyl Team	36	145	+ 6h 46' 38"	
172	Davide Ballerini	Italy	Quick-Step Alpha Vinyl Team	27	99	+ 4h 56' 56"	
173	James Knox	Great Britain	Quick-Step Alpha Vinyl Team	26	81	+ 4h 09' 18"	
174	Michael Mørkøv	Denmark	Quick-Step Alpha Vinyl Team	37	DNS-7	–	
175	Mauro Schmid †	Switzerland	Quick-Step Alpha Vinyl Team	22	75	+ 3h 52' 22"	
176	Pieter Serry	Belgium	Quick-Step Alpha Vinyl Team	33	148	+ 6h 57' 02"	
177	Bert Van Lerberghe	Belgium	Quick-Step Alpha Vinyl Team	29	146	+ 6h 48' 50"	
178	Mauri Vansevenant †	Belgium	Quick-Step Alpha Vinyl Team	22	30	+ 2h 03' 44"	
181	Simon Yates	Great Britain	Team BikeExchange–Jayco	29	DNF-17	–	
182	Lawson Craddock	United States	Team BikeExchange–Jayco	30	107	+ 5h 13' 16"	
183	Lucas Hamilton	Australia	Team BikeExchange–Jayco	26	13	+ 28' 02"	
184	Michael Hepburn	Australia	Team BikeExchange–Jayco	30	112	+ 5h 26' 35"	
185	Damien Howson	Australia	Team BikeExchange–Jayco	29	33	+ 2h 14' 31"	
186	Christopher Juul-Jensen	Denmark	Team BikeExchange–Jayco	32	93	+ 4h 41' 31"	
187	Callum Scotson	Australia	Team BikeExchange–Jayco	25	80	+ 4h 05' 51"	
188	Matteo Sobrero †	Italy	Team BikeExchange–Jayco	24	70	+ 3h 44' 44"	
191	Romain Bardet	France	Team DSM	31	DNF-13	–	
192	Thymen Arensman †	Netherlands	Team DSM	22	18	+ 42' 31"	
193	Cees Bol	Netherlands	Team DSM	26	DNS-14	–	
194	Romain Combaud	France	Team DSM	31	104	+ 5h 03' 35"	
195	Alberto Dainese †	Italy	Team DSM	24	122	+ 5h 41' 37"	
196	Nico Denz	Germany	Team DSM	28	111	+ 5h 24' 09"	
197	Chris Hamilton	Australia	Team DSM	26	39	+ 2h 29' 45"	
198	Martijn Tusveld	Netherlands	Team DSM	28	43	+ 2h 38' 00"	
201	Giulio Ciccone	Italy	Trek–Segafredo	27	25	+ 1h 32' 25"	
202	Dario Cataldo	Italy	Trek–Segafredo	37	73	+ 3h 49' 24"	
203	Mattias Skjelmose Jensen †	Denmark	Trek–Segafredo	21	40	+ 2h 33' 10"	
204	Juan Pedro López †	Spain	Trek–Segafredo	24	10	+ 18' 40"	
205	Bauke Mollema	Netherlands	Trek–Segafredo	35	26	+ 1h 39' 47"	
206	Jacopo Mosca	Italy	Trek–Segafredo	28	103	+ 5h 03' 07"	
207	Edward Theuns	Belgium	Trek–Segafredo	31	131	+ 5h 58' 13"	
208	Otto Vergaerde	Belgium	Trek–Segafredo	27	119	+ 5h 39' 05"	
211	João Almeida †	Portugal	UAE Team Emirates	23	COV-18	–	
212	Rui Oliveira	Portugal	UAE Team Emirates	25	141	+ 6h 27' 39"	
213	Rui Costa	Portugal	UAE Team Emirates	35	44	+ 2h 38' 11"	
214	Alessandro Covi †	Italy	UAE Team Emirates	23	45	+ 2h 50' 07"	
215	Davide Formolo	Italy	UAE Team Emirates	29	36	+ 2h 20' 58"	
216	Fernando Gaviria	Colombia	UAE Team Emirates	27	128	+ 5h 50' 24"	
217	Maximiliano Richeze	Argentina	UAE Team Emirates	39	142	+ 6h 27' 58"	
218	Diego Ulissi	Italy	UAE Team Emirates	32	37	+ 2h 26' 30"	

=== By team ===
(United Kingdom) Ineos Grenadiers (IGD)
No.	Rider	Pos.
1	Richard Carapaz (ECU)	2
2	Jonathan Castroviejo (ESP)	64
3	Jhonatan Narváez (ECU)	42
4	Richie Porte (AUS)	DNF-19
5	Salvatore Puccio (ITA)	85
6	Pavel Sivakov (FRA)	16
7	Ben Swift (GBR)	66
8	Ben Tulett (GBR)	38
Directeur sportif: Matteo Tosatto, Oliver Cookson

(France) AG2R Citroën Team (ALM)
No.	Rider	Pos.
11	Andrea Vendrame (ITA)	55
12	Lilian Calmejane (FRA)	86
13	Mikaël Cherel (FRA)	23
14	Felix Gall (AUT)	50
15	Jaakko Hänninen (FIN)	90
16	Lawrence Naesen (BEL)	124
17	Nans Peters (FRA)	58
18	Nicolas Prodhomme (FRA)	65
Directeur sportif: Didier Jannel, Artūras Kasputis

(Belgium) Alpecin–Fenix (AFC)
No.	Rider	Pos.
21	Mathieu van der Poel (NED)	57
22	Tobias Bayer (AUT)	100
23	Dries De Bondt (BEL)	109
24	Alexander Krieger (GER)	DNS-14
25	Senne Leysen (BEL)	118
26	Jakub Mareczko (ITA)	DNF-4
27	Stefano Oldani (ITA)	84
28	Oscar Riesebeek (NED)	113
Directeur sportif: Christoph Roodhooft, Bart Leysen

(Kazakhstan) Astana Qazaqstan Team (AST)
No.	Rider	Pos.
31	Vincenzo Nibali (ITA)	4
32	Valerio Conti (ITA)	DNF-15
33	David de la Cruz (ESP)	DNF-20
34	Joe Dombrowski (USA)	22
35	Fabio Felline (ITA)	41
36	Miguel Ángel López (COL)	DNF-4
37	Vadim Pronskiy (KAZ)	29
38	Harold Tejada (COL)	56
Directeur sportif: Alexandr Shefer, Mario Manzoni

Team Bahrain Victorious (TBV)
No.	Rider	Pos.
41	Mikel Landa (ESP)	3
42	Phil Bauhaus (GER)	138
43	Pello Bilbao (ESP)	5
44	Santiago Buitrago (COL)	12
45	Domen Novak (SLO)	31
46	Wout Poels (NED)	34
47	Jasha Sütterlin (GER)	87
48	Jan Tratnik (SLO)	DNF-3
Directeur sportif: Gorazd Štangelj, Alberto Volpi

(Italy) Bardiani–CSF–Faizanè (BCF)
No.	Rider	Pos.
51	Filippo Zana (ITA)	47
52	Luca Covili (ITA)	24
53	Filippo Fiorelli (ITA)	DNF-5
54	Davide Gabburo (ITA)	53
55	Sacha Modolo (ITA)	114
56	Luca Rastelli (ITA)	106
57	Alessandro Tonelli (ITA)	52
58	Samuele Zoccarato (ITA)	DNF-7
Directeur sportif: Roberto Reverberi, Alessandro Donati

(Germany) Bora–Hansgrohe (BOH)
No.	Rider	Pos.
61	Wilco Kelderman (NED)	17
62	Giovanni Aleotti (ITA)	72
63	Cesare Benedetti (POL)	120
64	Emanuel Buchmann (GER)	7
65	Patrick Gamper (AUT)	108
66	Jai Hindley (AUS)	1
67	Lennard Kämna (GER)	19
68	Ben Zwiehoff (GER)	51
Directeur sportif: Enrico Gasparotto, Jean-Pierre Heynderickx

(France) Cofidis (COF)
No.	Rider	Pos.
71	Guillaume Martin (FRA)	14
72	Davide Cimolai (ITA)	135
73	Simone Consonni (ITA)	121
74	Wesley Kreder (NED)	139
75	Anthony Perez (FRA)	88
76	Pierre-Luc Périchon (FRA)	94
77	Rémy Rochas (FRA)	71
78	Davide Villella (ITA)	63
Directeur sportif: Roberto Damiani, Gorka Guerricagoitia

(Italy) Drone Hopper–Androni Giocattoli (DRA)
No.	Rider	Pos.
81	Natnael Tesfatsion (ERI)	DNF-16
82	Mattia Bais (ITA)	82
83	Jefferson Alexander Cepeda (ECU)	DNS-19
84	Andrii Ponomar (UKR)	117
85	Simone Ravanelli (ITA)	91
86	Eduardo Sepúlveda (ARG)	76
87	Filippo Tagliani (ITA)	143
88	Edoardo Zardini (ITA)	78
Directeur sportif: Giovanni Ellena, Alessandro Spezialetti

(United States) EF Education–EasyPost (EFE)
No.	Rider	Pos.
91	Hugh Carthy (GBR)	9
92	Jonathan Kléver Caicedo (ECU)	DNS-16
93	Diego Andrés Camargo (COL)	79
94	Simon Carr (GBR)	DNS-8
95	Magnus Cort (DEN)	95
96	Owain Doull (GBR)	DNF-7
97	Merhawi Kudus (ERI)	61
98	Julius van den Berg (NED)	140
Directeur sportif: Juan Manuel Gárate, Matti Breschel

(Italy) Eolo–Kometa (EOK)
No.	Rider	Pos.
101	Lorenzo Fortunato (ITA)	15
102	Vincenzo Albanese (ITA)	68
103	Davide Bais (ITA)	125
104	Erik Fetter (HUN)	83
105	Francesco Gavazzi (ITA)	67
106	Mirco Maestri (ITA)	96
107	Samuele Rivi (ITA)	126
109	Diego Rosa (ITA)	77
Directeur sportif: Stefano Zanatta, Jesús Hernández Blázquez

(France) Groupama–FDJ (GFC)
No.	Rider	Pos.
111	Arnaud Démare (FRA)	130
112	Clément Davy (FRA)	144
113	Jacopo Guarnieri (ITA)	136
114	Ignatas Konovalovas (LTU)	115
115	Tobias Ludvigsson (SWE)	102
116	Miles Scotson (AUS)	127
117	Ramon Sinkeldam (NED)	132
118	Attila Valter (HUN)	35
Directeur sportif: Sébastien Joly, Jussi Veikkanen

(Belgium) Intermarché–Wanty–Gobert Matériaux (IWG)
No.	Rider	Pos.
121	Biniam Girmay (ERI)	DNS-11
122	Aimé De Gendt (BEL)	105
123	Jan Hirt (CZE)	6
124	Barnabás Peák (HUN)	110
125	Domenico Pozzovivo (ITA)	8
126	Lorenzo Rota (ITA)	32
127	Rein Taaramäe (EST)	46
128	Loïc Vliegen (BEL)	DNF-16
Directeur sportif: Valerio Piva, Steven De Neef

Israel–Premier Tech (IPT)
No.	Rider	Pos.
131	Giacomo Nizzolo (ITA)	DNS-14
132	Jenthe Biermans (BEL)	123
133	Matthias Brändle (AUT)	147
134	Alexander Cataford (CAN)	101
135	Alessandro De Marchi (ITA)	92
136	Alex Dowsett (GBR)	134
137	Reto Hollenstein (SUI)	129
138	Rick Zabel (GER)	137
Directeur sportif: Claudio Cozzi, Oscar Guerrero

(Netherlands) Team Jumbo–Visma (TJV)
No.	Rider	Pos.
141	Tom Dumoulin (NED)	DNF-14
142	Edoardo Affini (ITA)	97
143	Koen Bouwman (NED)	21
144	Pascal Eenkhoorn (NED)	62
145	Tobias Foss (NOR)	54
146	Gijs Leemreize (NED)	28
147	Sam Oomen (NED)	20
148	Jos van Emden (NED)	89
Directeur sportif: Addy Engels, Marc Reef

(Belgium) Lotto–Soudal (LTS)
No.	Rider	Pos.
151	Caleb Ewan (AUS)	DNS-12
152	Thomas De Gendt (BEL)	74
153	Matthew Holmes (GBR)	116
154	Roger Kluge (GER)	149
155	Sylvain Moniquet (BEL)	48
156	Michael Schwarzmann (GER)	133
157	Rüdiger Selig (GER)	DNF-9
158	Harm Vanhoucke (BEL)	DNF-17
Directeur sportif: Allan Davis, Marc Wauters

(Spain) Movistar Team (MOV)
No.	Rider	Pos.
161	Alejandro Valverde (ESP)	11
162	Jorge Arcas (ESP)	60
163	Will Barta (USA)	59
164	Oier Lazkano (ESP)	98
165	Antonio Pedrero (ESP)	27
166	José Joaquín Rojas (ESP)	69
167	Sergio Samitier (ESP)	DNF-7
168	Iván Ramiro Sosa (COL)	49
Directeur sportif: Maximilian Sciandri, Iván Velasco

(Belgium) Quick-Step Alpha Vinyl Team (QST)
No.	Rider	Pos.
171	Mark Cavendish (GBR)	145
172	Davide Ballerini (ITA)	99
173	James Knox (GBR)	81
174	Michael Mørkøv (DEN)	DNS-7
175	Mauro Schmid (SUI)	75
176	Pieter Serry (BEL)	148
177	Bert Van Lerberghe (BEL)	146
178	Mauri Vansevenant (BEL)	30
Directeur sportif: Davide Bramati, Geert Van Bondt

(Australia) Team BikeExchange–Jayco (BEX)
No.	Rider	Pos.
181	Simon Yates (GBR)	DNF-17
182	Lawson Craddock (USA)	107
183	Lucas Hamilton (AUS)	13
184	Michael Hepburn (AUS)	112
185	Damien Howson (AUS)	33
186	Christopher Juul-Jensen (DEN)	93
187	Callum Scotson (AUS)	80
188	Matteo Sobrero (ITA)	70
Directeur sportif: Matthew White, Gene Bates

(Netherlands) Team DSM (DSM)
No.	Rider	Pos.
191	Romain Bardet (FRA)	DNF-13
192	Thymen Arensman (NED)	18
193	Cees Bol (NED)	DNS-14
194	Romain Combaud (FRA)	104
195	Alberto Dainese (ITA)	122
196	Nico Denz (GER)	111
197	Chris Hamilton (AUS)	39
198	Martijn Tusveld (NED)	43
Directeur sportif: Matthew Winston, Marcel Sieberg

(United States) Trek–Segafredo (TFS)
No.	Rider	Pos.
201	Giulio Ciccone (ITA)	25
202	Dario Cataldo (ITA)	73
203	Mattias Skjelmose Jensen (DEN)	40
204	Juan Pedro López (ESP)	10
205	Bauke Mollema (NED)	26
206	Jacopo Mosca (ITA)	103
207	Edward Theuns (BEL)	131
208	Otto Vergaerde (BEL)	119
Directeur sportif: Grégory Rast, Adriano Baffi

(United Arab Emirates) UAE Team Emirates (UAD)
No.	Rider	Pos.
211	João Almeida (POR)	COV-18
212	Rui Oliveira (POR)	141
213	Rui Costa (POR)	44
214	Alessandro Covi (ITA)	45
215	Davide Formolo (ITA)	36
216	Fernando Gaviria (COL)	128
217	Maximiliano Richeze (ARG)	142
218	Diego Ulissi (ITA)	37
Directeur sportif: Fabio Baldato, Marco Marcato

=== By nationality ===
Country	No. of riders	Finished	Stage wins
Argentina	2	2	
Australia	9	7	1 (Jai Hindley)
Austria	4	4	
Belgium	14	12	2 (Dries De Bondt, Thomas De Gendt)
Canada	1	1	
Colombia	6	5	1 (Santiago Buitrago)
Czechia	1	1	1 (Jan Hirt)
Denmark	4	3	
Ecuador	4	2	
Eritrea	3	1	1 (Biniam Girmay)
Estonia	1	1	
Finland	1	1	
France	13	12	3 (Arnaud Démare x3)
Germany	11	9	1 (Lennard Kämna)
Great Britain	10	7	3 (Mark Cavendish, Simon Yates x2)
Hungary	3	3	
Italy	45	40	5 (Giulio Ciccone, Alessandro Covi, Alberto Dainese, Stefano Oldani, Matteo Sobrero)
Kazakhstan	1	1	
Lithuania	1	1	
Netherlands	17	15	3 (Koen Bouwman x2, Mathieu van der Poel)
Norway	1	1	
Poland	1	1	
Portugal	3	2	
Slovenia	2	1	
Spain	11	9	
Sweden	1	1	
Switzerland	2	2	
Ukraine	1	1	
United States	3	3	
Total	176	149	21
