= 2022 Giro d'Italia, Stage 12 to Stage 21 =

Cycling race stages

The 2022 Giro d'Italia was the 105th edition of the Giro d'Italia, one of cycling's Grand Tours. The Giro began in Budapest on 6 May, and Stage 12 occurred on 19 May with a stage from Parma. The race finished in Verona on 29 May.

== Classification standings ==
Legend
A pink jersey.	Denotes the leader of the general classification	A blue jersey.	Denotes the leader of the mountains classification
A violet jersey.	Denotes the leader of the points classification	A white jersey.	Denotes the leader of the young rider classification
A white jersey with a red number bib.	Denotes the winner of the combativity award		

== Stage 12 ==
19 May 2022 — Parma to Genoa, 204 km (127 mi)

The twelfth stage featured a hilly parcours, with the riders heading from Parma to Genoa for the race's longest stage at 204 kilometres (127 mi). From the start of the stage, the riders went on a false flat uphill, passing through the intermediate sprint for points after 56.9 kilometres (35.4 mi), before going up the third-category Passo del Bocco. The Giro went back to the climb for the first time since Wouter Weylandt died after crashing on the climb's descent eleven years ago. Following the descent and a short flat section, the riders reached the intermediate sprint for bonus seconds with 64.1 kilometres (39.8 mi) remaining. Shortly afterwards, the riders climbed the third-category La Colletta. The descent immediately led to the foot of the toughest climb of the day, the third-category Valico di Trensasco, a 4.3-kilometre (2.7 mi) climb with an average gradient of 8 per cent. The climb was crested with 30.6 kilometres (19.0 mi) left. After the descent, the rest of the stage was mostly flat.

Before the start of the stage, Caleb Ewan (Lotto–Soudal) announced that he was leaving the race to prepare for the upcoming Tour de France. A large fight for the break ensued during the initial kilometres. Multiple groups went up the road, but they were caught each time. At the intermediate sprint for points, with no break established yet, Arnaud Démare (Groupama–FDJ) took maximum points to extend his lead for the maglia ciclamino. Immediately after the sprint, a large group of 22 riders went off the front. At one point, a group containing Richard Carapaz (INEOS Grenadiers) tried to bridge to the break but they were reeled back in. Alessandro De Marchi (Israel–Premier Tech) and Dries De Bondt (Alpecin–Fenix) also tried to bridge to the break but they were swept up. Eventually, the Bardiani–CSF–Faizanè pair of Luca Covili and Davide Gabburo as well as Edoardo Zardini (Drone Hopper–Androni Giocattoli) were successful in their attempt to make it to the break, making it 25 riders up front. The highest placed GC rider in the break was Wilco Kelderman (Bora–Hansgrohe), who was 11 minutes down. The peloton let their gap increase and they were content to let the break contest for the stage win.

The break worked together over the Passo del Bocco before safely negotiating the descent. On the climb of La Colletta, Lorenzo Rota (Intermarché–Wanty–Gobert Matériaux) attacked from the break. Stefano Oldani (Alpecin–Fenix) and Gijs Leemreize (Team Jumbo–Visma) chased him before eventually catching him to make it three leaders up front. On the descent, multiple riders tried to bridge up to the leading group, but the leaders maintained their advantage. The three leaders reached the foot of the last climb of the day, the Valico di Trensasco, with a lead of around a minute over the chasing group. As the chasers reached the climb, Santiago Buitrago (Team Bahrain Victorious) began to distance the group. The only chasers able to go with him were Lucas Hamilton (Team BikeExchange–Jayco), Bauke Mollema (Trek–Segafredo), and Kelderman. The four chasers managed to decrease the leaders' advantage to around half a minute at the top of the climb. Despite the best efforts of the chasers to reduce the advantage of the lead group, they never came close to making the catch, with the leaders' advantage going back up towards a minute. Inside the final kilometre, Leemreize made a late attack, but Oldani and Rota quickly reeled him back. Leemreize opened his sprint inside the final 300 metres (980 ft). Oldani and Rota went around him, with Oldani holding off Rota to take his first professional victory. The chasing group crossed the line at 57 seconds down while the peloton finished at just over nine minutes down. This meant that Kelderman rose to 13th on GC at just less than three minutes behind while Hamilton rose to 16th. Juan Pedro López (Trek–Segafredo) kept the maglia rosa as there were no changes in the top ten.

Stage 12 Result
Rank	Rider	Team	Time
1	Stefano Oldani (ITA)	Alpecin–Fenix	4h 26' 47"
2	Lorenzo Rota (ITA)	Intermarché–Wanty–Gobert Matériaux	+ 0"
3	Gijs Leemreize (NED)	Team Jumbo–Visma	+ 2"
4	Bauke Mollema (NED)	Trek–Segafredo	+ 57"
5	Santiago Buitrago (COL)	Team Bahrain Victorious	+ 57"
6	Wilco Kelderman (NED)	Bora–Hansgrohe	+ 57"
7	Lucas Hamilton (AUS)	Team BikeExchange–Jayco	+ 57"
8	Andrea Vendrame (ITA)	AG2R Citroën Team	+ 1' 44"
9	Rein Taaramäe (EST)	Intermarché–Wanty–Gobert Matériaux	+ 1' 49"
10	Pascal Eenkhoorn (NED)	Team Jumbo–Visma	+ 2' 55"

General classification after Stage 12
Rank	Rider	Team	Time
1	Juan Pedro López (ESP)	Trek–Segafredo	51h 19' 07"
2	Richard Carapaz (ECU)	INEOS Grenadiers	+ 12"
3	João Almeida (POR)	UAE Team Emirates	+ 12"
4	Romain Bardet (FRA)	Team DSM	+ 14"
5	Jai Hindley (AUS)	Bora–Hansgrohe	+ 20"
6	Guillaume Martin (FRA)	Cofidis	+ 28"
7	Mikel Landa (ESP)	Team Bahrain Victorious	+ 29"
8	Domenico Pozzovivo (ITA)	Intermarché–Wanty–Gobert Matériaux	+ 54"
9	Emanuel Buchmann (GER)	Bora–Hansgrohe	+ 1' 09"
10	Pello Bilbao (ESP)	Team Bahrain Victorious	+ 1' 22"

== Stage 13 ==
20 May 2022 — Sanremo to Cuneo, 150 km (93 mi)

The thirteenth stage featured the penultimate chance for the sprinters to take a win, with the riders tackling 150 kilometres (93 mi) from Sanremo to Cuneo. After a flat start, the riders gradually went uphill before reaching the intermediate sprint for points after 43.7 kilometres (27.2 mi). Immediately afterwards, the riders tackled the only categorised climb of the day, the third-category Colle di Nava. The climb is 10.1 kilometres (6.3 mi) long with an average gradient of 6.7 per cent, providing a chance for the riders to drop the pure sprinters. The climb was crested with 95.9 kilometres (59.6 mi) remaining. The rest of the stage was mostly flat, apart from a few lumps on the way. The intermediate sprint for bonus seconds took place with 38 kilometres (24 mi) left.

After 9 kilometres (5.6 mi) of racing, a group of five riders was able to get up the road. The group contained Nicolas Prodhomme (AG2R Citroën Team), Filippo Tagliani (Drone Hopper–Androni Giocattoli), Julius van den Berg (EF Education–EasyPost), Mirco Maestri (Eolo–Kometa), and Pascal Eenkhoorn (Team Jumbo–Visma). The break led by as much as three and a half minutes before the sprinters’ teams began to control the gap. Just before the riders reached the climb of Colle di Nava, news filtered through that Romain Bardet (Team DSM), who sat in 4th on GC, abandoned the race. It was revealed that he got sick with stomach problems overnight and his condition did not improve. At the intermediate sprint for points, after the break took maximum points, Arnaud Démare (Groupama–FDJ), the maglia ciclamino leader, led the peloton across to extend his lead in the points classification. On the climb, the peloton took it easy, with no sprinters getting dropped. This allowed the break to extend their lead to almost seven minutes. Up front, Tagliani was dropped on the climb, making it four riders left in the lead group.

After the climb, the sprinters' teams began to send riders to the front of the peloton. However, the break worked well together to prevent the peloton from reeling them in too quickly. With 30 kilometres (19 mi) to go, the break still held a lead of around three minutes. Because of the peloton's pace, there was a split in the peloton but no GC contenders were caught out. The peloton slowly decreased the break's lead before finally making the catch inside the final kilometre. In the sprint, Groupama–FDJ successfully led out Démare into a good position. Despite challenges from Phil Bauhaus (Team Bahrain Victorious), Mark Cavendish (Quick-Step Alpha Vinyl Team), and Fernando Gaviria (UAE Team Emirates), Démare held them off to win his third stage in this year's Giro, further extending his lead in the points classification. Meanwhile, Juan Pedro López (Trek–Segafredo) extended his run in the maglia rosa to ten days. With Bardet's withdrawal, the riders below fourth on GC moved up one spot, with Alejandro Valverde (Movistar Team) moving inside the top ten as a result.

Stage 13 Result
Rank	Rider	Team	Time
1	Arnaud Démare (FRA)	Groupama–FDJ	3h 18' 16"
2	Phil Bauhaus (GER)	Team Bahrain Victorious	+ 0"
3	Mark Cavendish (GBR)	Quick-Step Alpha Vinyl Team	+ 0"
4	Fernando Gaviria (COL)	UAE Team Emirates	+ 0"
5	Alberto Dainese (ITA)	Team DSM	+ 0"
6	Simone Consonni (ITA)	Cofidis	+ 0"
7	Dries De Bondt (BEL)	Alpecin–Fenix	+ 0"
8	Giacomo Nizzolo (ITA)	Israel–Premier Tech	+ 0"
9	Andrea Vendrame (ITA)	AG2R Citroën Team	+ 0"
10	Tobias Bayer (AUT)	Alpecin–Fenix	+ 0"

General classification after Stage 13
Rank	Rider	Team	Time
1	Juan Pedro López (ESP)	Trek–Segafredo	54h 37' 23"
2	Richard Carapaz (ECU)	INEOS Grenadiers	+ 12"
3	João Almeida (POR)	UAE Team Emirates	+ 12"
4	Jai Hindley (AUS)	Bora–Hansgrohe	+ 20"
5	Guillaume Martin (FRA)	Cofidis	+ 28"
6	Mikel Landa (ESP)	Team Bahrain Victorious	+ 29"
7	Domenico Pozzovivo (ITA)	Intermarché–Wanty–Gobert Matériaux	+ 54"
8	Emanuel Buchmann (GER)	Bora–Hansgrohe	+ 1' 09"
9	Pello Bilbao (ESP)	Team Bahrain Victorious	+ 1' 22"
10	Alejandro Valverde (ESP)	Movistar Team	+ 1' 23"

== Stage 14 ==
21 May 2022 — Santena to Turin, 147 km (91 mi)

The fourteenth stage featured a mountainous parcours that took the riders from Santena to Turin. After a flat start and a few lumps, the riders tackled the third-category Il Pilonetto, which was crested after 43.3 kilometres (26.9 mi). Following an uncategorised hill, the riders climbed the uncategorised climb of Parco del Nobile for the first time before reaching the intermediate sprint for points with 70.8 kilometres (44.0 mi) left. At this point, the riders entered two laps of a circuit where the riders tackled the second-category climb of Superga, the second-category climb of Colle della Maddalena, and the uncategorised climb of Parco del Nobile. Superga, a 5-kilometre (3.1 mi) climb with an average gradient of 8.6 per cent, has featured in previous editions of Milano–Torino. Meanwhile, the climb of Colle della Maddalena is 3.5 kilometres (2.2 mi) long with an average gradient of 8.1 per cent, with the first 2 kilometres (1.2 mi) averaging 11.6 per cent. Each ascent of Superga and Colle della Maddalena were categorised. The riders reached the intermediate sprint for bonus seconds at the top of the third passage of Parco del Nobile with 4.5 kilometres (2.8 mi) remaining before the riders descended towards the finish.

The first rider to get a gap following the stage's official start was Mathieu van der Poel (Alpecin–Fenix), but he was caught after a while. A furious fight for the break ensued, and no break was formed until after the first climb of Il Pilonetto. After the leader of the KOM classification, Diego Rosa (Eolo–Kometa), took maximum points at the top, a group of 12 riders formed a break on the descent. INEOS Grenadiers initially controlled the gap, letting the break gain two and a half minutes, before Bora–Hansgrohe lit up the peloton with a ferocious pace. The peloton immediately began to split with the pace, with the break being caught by the elite GC group just before the first climb of Superga. At one point, only Richard Carapaz (INEOS Grenadiers) and Simon Yates (Team BikeExchange–Jayco) were able to follow Bora–Hansgrohe, but most GC contenders would eventually bridge up to them, including the race leader, Juan Pedro López (Trek–Segafredo). Contenders who were caught out included João Almeida (UAE Team Emirates), Guillaume Martin (Cofidis), Alejandro Valverde (Movistar Team), and Thymen Arensman (Team DSM). Just before the climb of Superga, Valverde suffered a mechanical, losing even more time. On the climb, after some effort, only Almeida was successful in bridging up to the lead group. Meanwhile, Martin, Valverde, and Arensman would lose considerable time, losing somewhere from eight to ten and a half minutes on the day.

Towards the top of Superga, more riders would drop until only 12 riders remained up front. Wilco Kelderman (Bora–Hansgrohe) continued to set the pace in the group throughout the rest of the first lap, also taking maximum KOM points at the first passages of Superga and Colle della Maddalena. As the group climbed Superga for the second time, Jai Hindley (Bora–Hansgrohe) accelerated, taking with him Vincenzo Nibali (Astana Qazaqstan Team), Mikel Landa (Team Bahrain Victorious), López, and Carapaz. Meanwhile, Almeida dragged Pello Bilbao (Team Bahrain Victorious), Emanuel Buchmann (Bora–Hansgrohe), Domenico Pozzovivo (Intermarché–Wanty–Gobert Matériaux), and Yates with him in the chase group, which slowly bridged up to the front group. The two groups merged with around 30 kilometres (19 mi) left. Towards the top, the race leader, López, was unable to follow the pace. At around the same time, Carapaz attacked, building a lead of around 20 seconds towards the top of Superga. His lead hovered between 20 and 30 seconds until he reached the foot of Colle della Maddalena.

As the chase group climbed up the Colle della Maddalena for the second time, Nibali attacked, bringing Hindley with him while Yates chased after the two. Hindley would soon drop Nibali, eventually catching Carapaz with around 14 kilometres (8.7 mi) left. Towards the top, Nibali and Yates caught the leading pair to make it four riders up front while only Almeida and Pozzovivo were left in the chase group. The pair came to within 12 seconds of catching the lead group, but they could not make the catch, with Pozzovivo also dropping Almeida on the descent. On the final uncategorised climb of Parco del Nobile, Nibali attacked but he was not able to get a gap. Eventually, Yates accelerated, building a gap of around 20 seconds towards the finish. He would not be caught as he won his second stage of the race. 15 seconds later, Hindley outsprinted Carapaz for second, with Nibali taking fourth. Pozzovivo and Almeida finished 28 and 39 seconds behind, respectively, while Landa and Bilbao lost 51 seconds. López eventually crossed the line at four and a half minutes down.

In the GC, Carapaz took the maglia rosa, seven seconds ahead of Hindley while Almeida sits in third, 30 seconds behind. Landa rose to fourth, 59 seconds down, with Pozzovivo in fifth, just two seconds behind the Spaniard. With his ride, Nibali rose to eighth. After ten days in the maglia rosa, López dropped to ninth at four minutes behind.

Stage 14 Result
Rank	Rider	Team	Time
1	Simon Yates (GBR)	Team BikeExchange–Jayco	3h 43' 44"
2	Jai Hindley (AUS)	Bora–Hansgrohe	+ 15"
3	Richard Carapaz (ECU)	INEOS Grenadiers	+ 15"
4	Vincenzo Nibali (ITA)	Astana Qazaqstan Team	+ 15"
5	Domenico Pozzovivo (ITA)	Intermarché–Wanty–Gobert Matériaux	+ 28"
6	João Almeida (POR)	UAE Team Emirates	+ 39"
7	Mikel Landa (ESP)	Team Bahrain Victorious	+ 51"
8	Pello Bilbao (ESP)	Team Bahrain Victorious	+ 51"
9	Emanuel Buchmann (GER)	Bora–Hansgrohe	+ 1' 10"
10	Juan Pedro López (ESP)	Trek–Segafredo	+ 4' 25"

General classification after Stage 14
Rank	Rider	Team	Time
1	Richard Carapaz (ECU)	INEOS Grenadiers	58h 21' 28"
2	Jai Hindley (AUS)	Bora–Hansgrohe	+ 7"
3	João Almeida (POR)	UAE Team Emirates	+ 30"
4	Mikel Landa (ESP)	Team Bahrain Victorious	+ 59"
5	Domenico Pozzovivo (ITA)	Intermarché–Wanty–Gobert Matériaux	+ 1' 01"
6	Pello Bilbao (ESP)	Team Bahrain Victorious	+ 1' 52"
7	Emanuel Buchmann (GER)	Bora–Hansgrohe	+ 1' 58"
8	Vincenzo Nibali (ITA)	Astana Qazaqstan Team	+ 2' 58"
9	Juan Pedro López (ESP)	Trek–Segafredo	+ 4' 04"
10	Alejandro Valverde (ESP)	Movistar Team	+ 9' 06"

== Stage 15 ==
22 May 2022 — Rivarolo Canavese to Cogne, 178 km (111 mi)

The race returned to the high mountains for the fifteenth stage, with the riders tackling three big climbs in the final half of the stage. The first 90.2 kilometres (56.0 mi) featured mostly rolling terrain before reaching the intermediate sprint for points at Pollein. Immediately afterwards, the riders climbed the first-category Pila-Les Fleurs, a 12.3-kilometre (7.6 mi) climb with an average gradient of 6.9 per cent. After the descent, the riders reached the foot of the toughest climb of the day, the first-category climb to Verrogne. The climb is 13.8 kilometres (8.6 mi) long with an average gradient of 7.1 per cent. The descent immediately led to the foot of the final climb, the second-category climb to Cogne, a 22.4-kilometre (13.9 mi) climb with an average gradient of 4.3 per cent. The first 9 kilometres (5.6 mi) had irregular gradients, featuring a 3-kilometre (1.9 mi) section that averages 7.1 per cent, before easing in the final 13 kilometres (8.1 mi), which averaged around 3 per cent. The intermediate sprint for bonus seconds took place 3.2 kilometres (2.0 mi) from the top of the climb.

Much like the previous day, attacks marked the start as several riders tried to get into the break. After around 5 kilometres (3.1 mi) of racing, a crash brought down several riders. Some notable names involved were the race leader, Richard Carapaz (INEOS Grenadiers), Mikel Landa (Team Bahrain Victorious), and Simon Yates (Team BikeExchange–Jayco), but all riders got back up and continued racing. It took almost 80 kilometres (50 mi) before a group of 27 riders got away from the peloton, with José Joaquín Rojas (Movistar Team) bridging up to them to make it 28 leaders. INEOS Grenadiers immediately went to the front of the peloton to set a steady pace, content to let the break battle for the stage win. On the climb of Pila-Les Fleurs, Koen Bouwman (Team Jumbo–Visma) attacked near the top to take the maximum KOM points. Without the maglia azzurra wearer, Diego Rosa (Eolo–Kometa), in the break, Bouwman moved into the virtual lead of the KOM classification. On the descent, he would soon be joined by Mathieu van der Poel (Alpecin–Fenix) and Martijn Tusveld (Team DSM). The trio increased their lead over the chasers to as much as a minute and a half at the foot of the second climb to Verrogne.

On the climb, the chasing group split while the front group began to lose ground. Giulio Ciccone (Trek–Segafredo) and Santiago Buitrago (Team Bahrain Victorious) emerged as the strongest riders from the chasers, with Antonio Pedrero (Movistar Team) also joining the two shortly thereafter. They went past van der Poel and Bouwman to go into the lead of the stage, while Tusveld held on for a while before being dropped. Near the top, Hugh Carthy (EF Education–EasyPost) and Rui Costa (UAE Team Emirates) were in pursuit of the lead group, before Carthy dropped Costa and bridging up to the lead group. On the descent, Costa and Tusveld managed to catch the front group to make it six up front. As they reached the steepest section of the climb to Cogne, Ciccone attacked twice, with his last move allowing him to go solo. He gradually built his gap over the rest of the climb to win the stage. Buitrago was the closest rider to him at a minute and a half down. The peloton rolled across the line at almost eight minutes down. Only Guillaume Martin (Cofidis) attacked from the peloton, gaining almost two minutes at the end. The move allowed him to enter the top ten, eight minutes down on Carapaz, who kept the maglia rosa heading into the second rest day.

Stage 15 Result
Rank	Rider	Team	Time
1	Giulio Ciccone (ITA)	Trek–Segafredo	4h 37' 41"
2	Santiago Buitrago (COL)	Team Bahrain Victorious	+ 1' 31"
3	Antonio Pedrero (ESP)	Movistar Team	+ 2' 19"
4	Hugh Carthy (GBR)	EF Education–EasyPost	+ 3' 09"
5	Martijn Tusveld (NED)	Team DSM	+ 4' 36"
6	Luca Covili (ITA)	Bardiani–CSF–Faizanè	+ 5' 08"
7	Natnael Tesfatsion (ERI)	Drone Hopper–Androni Giocattoli	+ 5' 27"
8	Bauke Mollema (NED)	Trek–Segafredo	+ 5' 27"
9	Gijs Leemreize (NED)	Team Jumbo–Visma	+ 5' 27"
10	Guillaume Martin (FRA)	Cofidis	+ 6' 06"

General classification after Stage 15
Rank	Rider	Team	Time
1	Richard Carapaz (ECU)	INEOS Grenadiers	63h 06' 57"
2	Jai Hindley (AUS)	Bora–Hansgrohe	+ 7"
3	João Almeida (POR)	UAE Team Emirates	+ 30"
4	Mikel Landa (ESP)	Team Bahrain Victorious	+ 59"
5	Domenico Pozzovivo (ITA)	Intermarché–Wanty–Gobert Matériaux	+ 1' 01"
6	Pello Bilbao (ESP)	Team Bahrain Victorious	+ 1' 52"
7	Emanuel Buchmann (GER)	Bora–Hansgrohe	+ 1' 58"
8	Vincenzo Nibali (ITA)	Astana Qazaqstan Team	+ 2' 58"
9	Juan Pedro López (ESP)	Trek–Segafredo	+ 4' 04"
10	Guillaume Martin (FRA)	Cofidis	+ 8' 02"

== Rest day 3 ==
23 May 2022 — Salò

== Stage 16 ==
24 May 2022 — Salò to Aprica (Sforzato Wine Stage), 202 km (126 mi)

Following the last rest day, the race entered the Dolomites in what is considered as the queen stage. Following the start in Salò, the riders gradually climbed towards the foot of the first-category Goletto di Cadino, a 19.9-kilometre (12.4 mi) climb with an average of 6.2 per cent. After the descent and a short valley section, the riders passed through the intermediate sprint for points with 89.4 kilometres (55.6 mi) left before reaching the foot of the first-category Passo del Mortirolo. On this occasion, the riders tackled the climb from Edolo, where the climb is 12.6 kilometres (7.8 mi) long with an average of 7.6 per cent. The climb was crested with 72.1 kilometres (44.8 mi) left. Following a technical descent, the riders tackled the climb of Teglio. Although unclassified, the climb is 5.1 kilometres (3.2 mi) long at an average of 8.7 per cent, with the riders reaching the intermediate sprint for bonus seconds at the top. The descent immediately led to the foot of the final climb, the first-category Valico di Santa Cristina, a 13.5-kilometre (8.4 mi) climb with an average of 8 per cent. The last 6.6 kilometres (4.1 mi) of the climb averages 10.1 per cent, with the climb being crested at 6.2 kilometres (3.9 mi) from the finish. A short descent and false flat uphill section led to the finish at Aprica. Overall, the altitude gain of the stage added up to 5,250 metres (17,220 ft).

After the official start, a group of six riders went up the road, including the likes of Mark Cavendish (Quick-Step Alpha Vinyl Team), Thomas De Gendt (Lotto–Soudal), and Mathieu van der Poel (Alpecin–Fenix). Multiple riders tried to bridge up to them, but they were unable to do so. On the climb of Goletto di Cadino, the sextet up front was brought back before a 25-man break went up the road. Some notable names in the break were Alejandro Valverde (Movistar Team), Guillaume Martin (Cofidis), Simon Yates (Team BikeExchange–Jayco), Giulio Ciccone (Trek–Segafredo), and the Bora–Hansgrohe pair of Wilco Kelderman and Lennard Kämna. INEOS Grenadiers immediately went to the front of the peloton to control the gap. Towards the top, 18 riders were left in the break, while Ciccone outsprinted the maglia azzurra leader, Koen Bouwman (Team Jumbo–Visma), for the maximum KOM points. On the short valley before the Mortirolo, the break split, with eight riders going off the front. On the climb of the Mortirolo, Lorenzo Rota (Intermarché–Wanty–Gobert Matériaux), Chris Hamilton (Team DSM), and Dario Cataldo (Trek–Segafredo) dropped from the front while Hugh Carthy (EF Education–EasyPost) and Jan Hirt (Intermarché–Wanty–Gobert Matériaux) managed to bridge to the front, making it seven riders in the lead. At the top, Bouwman took maximum KOM points to extend his lead in the KOM classification.

As the break reached the uncategorised climb to Teglio, Bouwman got dropped while the chase group got swept up by the peloton. The six leaders' advantage over the peloton gradually decreased but they maintained a three-minute advantage ahead of the final climb to Valico di Santa Cristina. Just before the climb, Kämna dropped the rest of the lead group, building a lead of around 50 seconds on the lowest slopes of the climb. Towards the steepest sections, Thymen Arensman (Team DSM) and Hirt attacked from the chase group at separate times, dropping Carthy and Valverde. They joined together in pursuit of Kämna, with the pair catching him with 8.7 kilometres (5.4 mi) left. Arensman and Hirt immediately dropped Kämna before Hirt distanced Arensman with 7.9 kilometres (4.9 mi) remaining. Hirt held a lead of around 15 seconds on Arensman over the top of Santa Cristina. Arensman tried to close the gap on the descent, but Hirt held him off, winning his first Grand Tour stage. Arensman finished just seven seconds down.

In the peloton, INEOS Grenadiers took control until Astana Qazaqstan Team went to the front on the climb of Mortirolo. They set a fast tempo that thinned out the peloton into around 12 riders. On the descent, Vincenzo Nibali (Astana Qazaqstan Team) attacked, going solo off the front of the peloton. He held a lead of around 10 seconds, but he had to wait for the rest of the group. As Nibali attacked, Domenico Pozzovivo (Intermarché–Wanty–Gobert Matériaux) crashed. He was a minute behind at one point, but he came back before the uncategorised climb to Teglio as the peloton slowed the pace. On the climb, Team Bahrain Victorious took over at the front of the peloton, controlling the pace until they tackled the climb of Valico di Santa Cristina. Several contenders were dropped by the pace, like Juan Pedro López (Trek–Segafredo) and Martin, who both dropped out of the top ten. Emanuel Buchmann (Bora–Hansgrohe) and Pozzovivo were also distanced further up the climb of Santa Cristina.

With around 10 kilometres (6.2 mi) to go, a touch of wheels caused Pello Bilbao (Team Bahrain Victorious) to go down, while his teammate, Mikel Landa, João Almeida (UAE Team Emirates), and Jai Hindley (Bora–Hansgrohe) were caught up. All riders would get back to the maglia rosa group, before Landa accelerated with around 9.5 kilometres (5.9 mi) to go. Only the race leader, Richard Carapaz (INEOS Grenadiers), and Hindley were able to follow him. Almeida and Nibali tried to get back before Almeida dropped Nibali in pursuit of the maglia rosa group, which passed the remnants of the breakaway. The trio maintained their advantage over the top and on the descent, with Hindley outsprinting Carapaz for third, 1' 24" behind Hirt, and the four bonus seconds. Almeida lost 14 seconds while Nibali lost 42 seconds. Bilbao crossed the line almost two minutes behind the maglia rosa group while Pozzovivo and Buchmann lost almost three minutes.

In the GC, Carapaz kept the maglia rosa with a decreased advantage of just three seconds over Hindley. Almeida kept third at 44 seconds down while Landa is the only other rider within a minute at 59 seconds down. Nibali entered the top five, just ahead of Pozzovivo, Bilbao, and Buchmann. With their rides in the break, Hirt and Valverde entered the top ten.

Stage 16 Result
Rank	Rider	Team	Time
1	Jan Hirt (CZE)	Intermarché–Wanty–Gobert Matériaux	5h 40' 45"
2	Thymen Arensman (NED)	Team DSM	+ 7"
3	Jai Hindley (AUS)	Bora–Hansgrohe	+ 1' 24"
4	Richard Carapaz (ECU)	INEOS Grenadiers	+ 1' 24"
5	Alejandro Valverde (ESP)	Movistar Team	+ 1' 24"
6	Mikel Landa (ESP)	Team Bahrain Victorious	+ 1' 24"
7	Lennard Kämna (GER)	Bora–Hansgrohe	+ 1' 38"
8	João Almeida (POR)	UAE Team Emirates	+ 1' 38"
9	Vincenzo Nibali (ITA)	Astana Qazaqstan Team	+ 2' 06"
10	Hugh Carthy (GBR)	EF Education–EasyPost	+ 2' 13"

General classification after Stage 16
Rank	Rider	Team	Time
1	Richard Carapaz (ECU)	INEOS Grenadiers	68h 49' 06"
2	Jai Hindley (AUS)	Bora–Hansgrohe	+ 3"
3	João Almeida (POR)	UAE Team Emirates	+ 44"
4	Mikel Landa (ESP)	Team Bahrain Victorious	+ 59"
5	Vincenzo Nibali (ITA)	Astana Qazaqstan Team	+ 3' 40"
6	Domenico Pozzovivo (ITA)	Intermarché–Wanty–Gobert Matériaux	+ 3' 48"
7	Pello Bilbao (ESP)	Team Bahrain Victorious	+ 3' 51"
8	Emanuel Buchmann (GER)	Bora–Hansgrohe	+ 4' 45"
9	Jan Hirt (CZE)	Intermarché–Wanty–Gobert Matériaux	+ 7' 42"
10	Alejandro Valverde (ESP)	Movistar Team	+ 9' 04"

== Stage 17 ==
25 May 2022 — Ponte di Legno to Lavarone, 168 km (104 mi)

Another mountain stage awaited the riders on the seventeenth stage, with the riders tackling two first-category climbs in the final third of the stage. Out of the gates, the riders went up the uncategorised climb of Passo del Tonale, an 8.6-kilometre (5.3 mi) climb with an average of 6.3 per cent. After cresting the climb, the riders faced a 70-kilometre (43 mi) long descent until they reached the foot of the third-category climb to Giovo, which is 5.9 kilometres (3.7 mi) long with an average of 6.8 per cent. Following the climb, they faced a rolling terrain before reaching the intermediate sprint for points with 46.2 kilometres (28.7 mi) left. Immediately afterwards, the riders tackled the first-category Passo del Vetriolo, an 11.8-kilometre (7.3 mi) climb with an average of 7.7 per cent. The descent and a short valley section led to the intermediate sprint for bonus seconds with 18.1 kilometres (11.2 mi) remaining, right near the foot of the first-category Monterovere. The climb is 7.9 kilometres (4.9 mi) long with an average of 9.9 per cent, with the steepest sections right near the top. The climb was crested with 7.9 kilometres (4.9 mi) remaining, before the riders tackled a rolling terrain to the finish.

On the Passo del Tonale, Felix Gall (AG2R Citroën Team), Hugh Carthy (EF Education–EasyPost), Alessandro Covi (UAE Team Emirates), and Thymen Arensman (Team DSM) got a gap over the peloton. Further up the climb, several chase groups formed before the peloton slowed down. On the descent, the front group ballooned to 25 riders while the peloton was being controlled by INEOS Grenadiers. The best-placed GC rider in the break was Jan Hirt (Intermarché–Wanty–Gobert Matériaux), who was ninth at only seven minutes down. The break gradually built their advantage to six and a half minutes, with the peloton not keen on chasing the break. At the climb to Giovo, Koen Bouwman (Team Jumbo–Visma) took maximum KOM points to extend his lead for the maglia azzurra. 79 kilometres (49 mi) from the finish, the break split, with 10 riders slipping off the front. The rest of the break slowly caught up before making the catch with 70 kilometres (43 mi) left. A bit later, Mathieu van der Poel (Alpecin–Fenix) attacked from the break. Guillaume Martin (Cofidis), Covi, and Gall managed to bridge to him to make it four riders at the front. The quartet extended their lead to a minute over the chasers ahead of the climb of Passo del Vetriolo.

On the climb, Covi was dropped by the front group. There were also two accelerations by Carthy in the chase group, with his last move turning the chase group into a more selective group. He brought Santiago Buitrago (Team Bahrain Victorious), Hirt, and Bouwman with him, catching the front group with 36 kilometres (22 mi) to go. Gijs Leemreize (Team Jumbo–Visma) also bridged to the front a few kilometres later. At the top, Bouwman again took maximum KOM points to extend his lead further. On the technical descent, Leemreize and van der Poel attacked, building a lead of a minute and a half ahead of the final climb to Monterovere. On the lower slopes, van der Poel distanced Leemreize, but Leemreize slowly reeled him back before passing him with 11 kilometres (6.8 mi) left. In the chase group, Buitrago dropped the rest of the chasers, going in pursuit of Leemreize. He caught him with 8.3 kilometres (5.2 mi) left. Towards the top, Buitrago dropped Leemreize, gradually building his gap to win the stage, despite crashing earlier during the stage. Leemreize finished 35 seconds behind while Hirt and Carthy finished two and a half minutes down.

In the peloton, INEOS Grenadiers continued to pace until Team Bahrain Victorious took over on the Passo del Vetriolo. The pace thinned out the group, with Alejandro Valverde (Movistar Team) and Domenico Pozzovivo (Intermarché–Wanty–Gobert Matériaux) among those losing contact on the climb. As the peloton reached the climb of Monterovere, INEOS Grenadiers took over once again. Towards the top, Emanuel Buchmann (Bora–Hansgrohe), Pello Bilbao (Team Bahrain Victorious), Vincenzo Nibali (Astana Qazaqstan Team), and João Almeida (UAE Team Emirates) were unable to follow the pace. A few kilometres from the top, Mikel Landa (Team Bahrain Victorious) made his move, with only the race leader, Richard Carapaz (INEOS Grenadiers), and Jai Hindley (Bora–Hansgrohe) able to follow him. Landa also got some help from his teammate, Wout Poels, who came back a couple of times on the climb. The three contenders remained together until the finish, where Carapaz and Hindley sprinted to gain six seconds on Landa. Almeida lost a minute while Nibali lost two minutes. Buchmann and Bilbao finished two and a half minutes behind the Carapaz group while Pozzovivo and Valverde ended up losing nine minutes.

In the GC, Carapaz kept the maglia rosa, maintaining his three-second advantage over Hindley while Landa moved into third, 1' 05" down. Almeida dropped to fourth at almost two minutes down while Nibali retained fifth. Hirt moved up to eighth after finishing ahead of the main contenders. Juan Pedro López (Trek–Segafredo) moved back inside the top ten while Pozzovivo dropped to tenth.

Stage 17 Result
Rank	Rider	Team	Time
1	Santiago Buitrago (COL)	Team Bahrain Victorious	4h 27' 41"
2	Gijs Leemreize (NED)	Team Jumbo–Visma	+ 35"
3	Jan Hirt (CZE)	Intermarché–Wanty–Gobert Matériaux	+ 2' 28"
4	Hugh Carthy (GBR)	EF Education–EasyPost	+ 2' 28"
5	Richard Carapaz (ECU)	INEOS Grenadiers	+ 2' 53"
6	Jai Hindley (AUS)	Bora–Hansgrohe	+ 2' 53"
7	Mauri Vansevenant (BEL)	Quick-Step Alpha Vinyl Team	+ 2' 57"
8	Koen Bouwman (NED)	Team Jumbo–Visma	+ 2' 59"
9	Guillaume Martin (FRA)	Cofidis	+ 2' 59"
10	Mikel Landa (ESP)	Team Bahrain Victorious	+ 2' 59"

General classification after Stage 17
Rank	Rider	Team	Time
1	Richard Carapaz (ECU)	INEOS Grenadiers	73h 19' 40"
2	Jai Hindley (AUS)	Bora–Hansgrohe	+ 3"
3	Mikel Landa (ESP)	Team Bahrain Victorious	+ 1' 05"
4	João Almeida (POR)	UAE Team Emirates	+ 1' 54"
5	Vincenzo Nibali (ITA)	Astana Qazaqstan Team	+ 5' 48"
6	Pello Bilbao (ESP)	Team Bahrain Victorious	+ 6' 19"
7	Jan Hirt (CZE)	Intermarché–Wanty–Gobert Matériaux	+ 7' 12"
8	Emanuel Buchmann (GER)	Bora–Hansgrohe	+ 7' 13"
9	Juan Pedro López (ESP)	Trek–Segafredo	+ 12' 27"
10	Domenico Pozzovivo (ITA)	Intermarché–Wanty–Gobert Matériaux	+ 12' 30"

== Stage 18 ==
26 May 2022 — Borgo Valsugana to Treviso, 156 km (97 mi)

After four consecutive mountain stages, the eighteenth stage featured the only flat stage of the third week and the last chance for the sprinters to take the win. The first 106.7 kilometres (66.3 mi) featured rolling terrain, with a few lumps and two fourth-category climbs. The last categorised climb, the Muro di Ca' del Poggio, is only 1.1 kilometres (0.68 mi) long, but it averages 12.3 per cent and was crested with 54 kilometres (34 mi) left. Following the climb, the rest of the stage was flat. The intermediate sprint for points took place after just 24.6 kilometres (15.3 mi) while the intermediate sprint for bonus seconds took place with 39.6 kilometres (24.6 mi) remaining.

Before the stage, it was reported that João Almeida (UAE Team Emirates), fourth on GC, tested positive for COVID-19, forcing him to withdraw from the race. This meant that Juan Pedro López (Trek–Segafredo) took over the maglia bianca as the best young rider. A few kilometres following the start, a group of four riders escaped from the peloton. The break was composed of Magnus Cort (EF Education–EasyPost), Edoardo Affini (Team Jumbo–Visma), Davide Gabburo (Bardiani–CSF–Faizanè), and Dries De Bondt (Alpecin–Fenix). They gained a maximum advantage of around two and a half minutes before the sprinters’ team began to stabilise the gap. At the intermediate sprint for points, the four leaders took maximum points while the maglia ciclamino wearer, Arnaud Démare (Groupama–FDJ), led the peloton across to extend his lead. As the riders went across the top of Muro di Ca' del Poggio, the break still held a lead of two and a half minutes.

In the final part of the stage, the break's lead gradually decreased, but the leaders collaborated well together to maintain their advantage. Meanwhile, in the peloton, there was a split; the most notable name caught out was López, who sat ninth on GC. With less than 20 kilometres (12 mi) to go, the break still held a lead of almost two minutes on the peloton. Despite the sprinters' teams efforts to chase the leaders down, the break headed inside the final kilometre with a lead of around 25 seconds. Cort led out the sprint before Affini and De Bondt came around him in the final 250 metres (820 ft). De Bondt managed to get ahead of Affini by half a wheel to win his first Grand Tour stage. Alberto Dainese (Team DSM) led the sprinters' group home at 14 seconds down, with the group of favorites finishing a few seconds further behind. López's group ended up losing two and a half minutes. Meanwhile, Jai Hindley suffered a mechanical close to the finish, but since it happened inside the last 3 kilometres (1.9 mi), he was credited with the same time as the GC group. Because of Almeida's withdrawal, the contenders below third moved up a spot, but López kept ninth because of his time loss. Hugh Carthy (EF Education–EasyPost) also entered the top ten as Richard Carapaz (INEOS Grenadiers) kept the maglia rosa.

Stage 18 Result
Rank	Rider	Team	Time
1	Dries De Bondt (BEL)	Alpecin–Fenix	3h 21' 21"
2	Edoardo Affini (ITA)	Team Jumbo–Visma	+ 0"
3	Magnus Cort (DEN)	EF Education–EasyPost	+ 0"
4	Davide Gabburo (ITA)	Bardiani–CSF–Faizanè	+ 0"
5	Alberto Dainese (ITA)	Team DSM	+ 14"
6	Arnaud Démare (FRA)	Groupama–FDJ	+ 14"
7	Davide Cimolai (ITA)	Cofidis	+ 14"
8	Mark Cavendish (GBR)	Quick-Step Alpha Vinyl Team	+ 14"
9	Fernando Gaviria (COL)	UAE Team Emirates	+ 14"
10	Simone Consonni (ITA)	Cofidis	+ 14"

General classification after Stage 18
Rank	Rider	Team	Time
1	Richard Carapaz (ECU)	INEOS Grenadiers	76h 41' 15"
2	Jai Hindley (AUS)	Bora–Hansgrohe	+ 3"
3	Mikel Landa (ESP)	Team Bahrain Victorious	+ 1' 05"
4	Vincenzo Nibali (ITA)	Astana Qazaqstan Team	+ 5' 48"
5	Pello Bilbao (ESP)	Team Bahrain Victorious	+ 6' 19"
6	Jan Hirt (CZE)	Intermarché–Wanty–Gobert Matériaux	+ 7' 12"
7	Emanuel Buchmann (GER)	Bora–Hansgrohe	+ 7' 13"
8	Domenico Pozzovivo (ITA)	Intermarché–Wanty–Gobert Matériaux	+ 12' 30"
9	Juan Pedro López (ESP)	Trek–Segafredo	+ 15' 04"
10	Hugh Carthy (GBR)	EF Education–EasyPost	+ 17' 03"

== Stage 19 ==
27 May 2022 — Marano Lagunare to Santuario di Castelmonte, 177 km (110 mi)

The race headed back to the mountains for the nineteenth stage, with the riders tackling a 177-kilometre (110 mi) course from Marano Lagunare to Santuario di Castelmonte. The first 66.7 kilometres (41.4 mi) were mostly flat, with the riders passing through the intermediate sprint for points after 55.8 kilometres (34.7 mi) of racing. Afterwards, the climbing began with the third-category climb to Villanova Grotte, a 3.7-kilometre (2.3 mi) climb with an average of 8 per cent. This was immediately followed by the third-category climb of Passo di Tanamea, which is 9 kilometres (5.6 mi) long with an average of 5.4 per cent. After a section of rolling terrain, the riders entered Slovenia where they tackled the hardest climb of the day, the first-category Kolovrat. The climb, which is 10.3 kilometres (6.4 mi) long with an average of 9.2 per cent, was crested with 43.4 kilometres (27.0 mi) left. Following the descent, the riders went back to Italy before passing through the intermediate sprint for bonus seconds with 9.6 kilometres (6.0 mi) left. Shortly afterwards, the riders tackled the second-category Santuario di Castelmonte, a 7.1-kilometre (4.4 mi) climb with an average of 7.8 per cent, with the riders finishing at the top of it.

A few kilometres after the stage's official start, a group of 12 riders, including the maglia azzurra wearer, Koen Bouwman (Team Jumbo–Visma), went up the road. Although some riders tried to catch the break, the peloton gradually let the group go. The break gained a maximum advantage of 11 minutes before Bora–Hansgrohe took control of the peloton. At the intermediate sprint for points, Fernando Gaviria (UAE Team Emirates) sprinted to take maximum points. As the break went across the first two climbs of the day, Bouwman took maximum KOM points to further increase his lead in the KOM classification. The break soon reached the foot of the first-category climb of Kolovrat with a lead of more than eight minutes over the peloton.

On the climb, the break split into several groups, with Mauro Schmid (Quick-Step Alpha Vinyl Team), Attila Valter (Groupama–FDJ), Alessandro Tonelli (Bardiani–CSF–Faizanè), and Bouwman proving themselves the strongest from the front group. Most of the breakaway riders were swept up by the peloton, but Andrea Vendrame (AG2R Citroën Team) slowly clawed his way back to the front group. As he caught the front group, Vendrame immediately went on the attack on the descent. He gained a few seconds but was eventually brought back. On the final climb, although Tonelli, Bouwman, and Valter made some attacks, the stage win was decided by a five-man sprint. On the final corner, which featured a sharp left-hander, Bouwman made his turn first. This caused Schmid, who was close to him, to suddenly break and miss the apex while Vendrame and Valter misread the turn and had to stop their sprints. Schmid tried to go around Bouwman but the Dutchman held him off to take his second stage of the Giro. By taking maximum KOM points at all four climbs, Bouwman also mathematically clinched the maglia azzurra, provided he finishes the race.

In the GC group, there were no action until the final climb of Santuario di Castelmonte. As INEOS Grenadiers lifted the pace, Emanuel Buchmann (Bora–Hansgrohe) got distanced first, soon followed by Juan Pedro López (Trek–Segafredo), Domenico Pozzovivo (Intermarché–Wanty–Gobert Matériaux), and Alejandro Valverde (Movistar Team). Towards the top, Richard Carapaz (INEOS Grenadiers), Jai Hindley (Bora–Hansgrohe), and Mikel Landa (Team Bahrain Victorious) traded attacks, but the top three GC riders were inseparable. Most of the contenders finished between three and 25 seconds behind the trio, but Buchmann lost more than a minute. In the GC, Carapaz kept the maglia rosa and although there were time gaps between the top ten contenders, there were no movements in the top ten ahead of the final mountain stage of the race.

Stage 19 Result
Rank	Rider	Team	Time
1	Koen Bouwman (NED)	Team Jumbo–Visma	4h 32' 55"
2	Mauro Schmid (SUI)	Quick-Step Alpha Vinyl Team	+ 0"
3	Alessandro Tonelli (ITA)	Bardiani–CSF–Faizanè	+ 3"
4	Attila Valter (HUN)	Groupama–FDJ	+ 6"
5	Andrea Vendrame (ITA)	AG2R Citroën Team	+ 10"
6	Tobias Bayer (AUT)	Alpecin–Fenix	+ 2' 45"
7	Guillaume Martin (FRA)	Cofidis	+ 3' 49"
8	Richard Carapaz (ECU)	INEOS Grenadiers	+ 3' 56"
9	Jai Hindley (AUS)	Bora–Hansgrohe	+ 3' 56"
10	Mikel Landa (ESP)	Team Bahrain Victorious	+ 3' 56"

General classification after Stage 19
Rank	Rider	Team	Time
1	Richard Carapaz (ECU)	INEOS Grenadiers	81h 18' 12"
2	Jai Hindley (AUS)	Bora–Hansgrohe	+ 3"
3	Mikel Landa (ESP)	Team Bahrain Victorious	+ 1' 05"
4	Vincenzo Nibali (ITA)	Astana Qazaqstan Team	+ 5' 53"
5	Pello Bilbao (ESP)	Team Bahrain Victorious	+ 6' 22"
6	Jan Hirt (CZE)	Intermarché–Wanty–Gobert Matériaux	+ 7' 15"
7	Emanuel Buchmann (GER)	Bora–Hansgrohe	+ 8' 21"
8	Domenico Pozzovivo (ITA)	Intermarché–Wanty–Gobert Matériaux	+ 12' 55"
9	Juan Pedro López (ESP)	Trek–Segafredo	+ 15' 29"
10	Hugh Carthy (GBR)	EF Education–EasyPost	+ 17' 10"

== Stage 20 ==
28 May 2022 — Belluno to Marmolada (Passo Fedaia), 168 km (104 mi)

The penultimate stage of the race featured the final mountain stage, with the riders tackling three big climbs at high altitude. After a flat start and two uncategorised hills, the riders gradually went uphill towards the intermediate sprint for points after 63.5 kilometres (39.5 mi) of racing, right at the foot of the first-category Passo San Pellegrino. The climb is 18.5 kilometres (11.5 mi) long with an average of 6.2 per cent, but the last 6 kilometres (3.7 mi) averaged 9 per cent. After the descent and a valley section, the riders tackled the climb of Passo Pordoi, which is 11.8 kilometres (7.3 mi) long with a steady average of 6.8 per cent. At 2,239 metres (7,346 ft) above sea level, the climb is the Cima Coppi for the highest point reached during the race. The climb was crested at 44.6 kilometres (27.7 mi) from the finish. The long descent immediately led to the foot of the final climb for a summit finish at the top of the first-category Passo Fedaia. The climb is 14 kilometres (8.7 mi) long with an average of 7.6 per cent, but the last 5.4 kilometres (3.4 mi) averaged approximately 11.1 per cent. The intermediate sprint for bonus seconds took place halfway up the climb, at 5.5 kilometres (3.4 mi) from the finish.

Multiple attacks marked the start of the stage as several riders attempted to jump into the break. As the riders reached the uncategorised climbs after just 20 kilometres (12 mi), a group of 15 riders went up the road while the peloton began to splinter into pieces. At one point, Domenico Pozzovivo (Intermarché–Wanty–Gobert Matériaux), eighth on GC, was dropped but he eventually managed to get back. As the peloton calmed down, the break began to increase their lead to as much as six minutes while Team Bahrain Victorious took over at the front of the peloton. The break headed up the first climb of Passo San Pellegrino with a lead of more than five minutes over the peloton. There were no moves from both groups on the climb, with Davide Formolo (UAE Team Emirates) taking maximum KOM points ahead of Giulio Ciccone (Trek–Segafredo). Over the next few kilometres, the break maintained their five-minute advantage as Team Bahrain Victorious continued to set a steady pace in the peloton.

On the climb of Passo Pordoi, the break split as several riders began to drop. 54 kilometres (34 mi) from the finish, Edoardo Zardini (Drone Hopper–Androni Giocattoli) was the first to make his move from the break, but he was quickly caught. After a kilometre, Alessandro Covi (UAE Team Emirates) attacked from the break. A chase group of eight riders formed behind Covi, but the lack of cooperation from the chasers meant that his lead gradually ballooned. At the top, Covi led by a minute and a half, taking the Cima Coppi in the process. On the descent, his lead continued to increase, going out to a maximum of two and a half minutes on the bottom of Passo Fedaia. On the lower slopes of the climb, the chase group splintered, with Domen Novak (Team Bahrain Victorious), Thymen Arensman (Team DSM), Antonio Pedrero (Movistar Team), and Ciccone emerging as the strongest chasers. Upon reaching the climb's steepest sections, Novak went off in pursuit of Covi, who was still leading by around a minute and a half at this point. Novak began to eat into Covi's advantage, getting to as close as 30 seconds, but Covi held him off to win his first Grand Tour stage. Novak finished 32 seconds down, with Ciccone finishing a further five seconds behind the Slovenian.

In the GC group, there were no attacks until they reached the final climb of Passo Fedaia. On the lower slopes of the climb, Guillaume Martin (Cofidis) attacked, but he was caught as INEOS Grenadiers took over the pace-setting. The GC group continued to thin out, with the INEOS Grenadiers pair of Pavel Sivakov and Richard Carapaz, Jai Hindley (Bora–Hansgrohe), Mikel Landa (Team Bahrain Victorious), and Hugh Carthy (EF Education–EasyPost) the only ones remaining in the group on the climb's steepest sections. Inside the final 5 kilometres (3.1 mi), Hindley attacked and only the race leader, Carapaz, could follow. Hindley linked up with his teammate, Lennard Kämna, who dropped back from the break. As Kämna set the tempo, Carapaz began to lose contact within the last 3 kilometres (1.9 mi). Hindley gradually increased his advantage towards the top, while Carapaz suffered as he was passed and dropped by Kämna, Carthy, and Landa. Hindley eventually finished the stage in sixth, exactly two and a half minutes down, while Carthy and Landa finished 49 seconds behind the Australian. Carapaz ended up losing almost a minute and a half.

In the GC standings, Hindley took over the maglia rosa, almost a minute and a half ahead of Carapaz. Landa closed to within 26 seconds of Carapaz with his time gains on the Ecuadorian. There were no other movements within the top ten despite the time gaps on the stage as the race headed to the final day individual time trial.

Stage 20 Result
Rank	Rider	Team	Time
1	Alessandro Covi (ITA)	UAE Team Emirates	4h 46' 34"
2	Domen Novak (SLO)	Team Bahrain Victorious	+ 32"
3	Giulio Ciccone (ITA)	Trek–Segafredo	+ 37"
4	Antonio Pedrero (ESP)	Movistar Team	+ 1' 36"
5	Thymen Arensman (NED)	Team DSM	+ 1' 50"
6	Jai Hindley (AUS)	Bora–Hansgrohe	+ 2' 30"
7	Gijs Leemreize (NED)	Team Jumbo–Visma	+ 3' 04"
8	Hugh Carthy (GBR)	EF Education–EasyPost	+ 3' 19"
9	Mikel Landa (ESP)	Team Bahrain Victorious	+ 3' 19"
10	Lennard Kämna (GER)	Bora–Hansgrohe	+ 3' 39"

General classification after Stage 20
Rank	Rider	Team	Time
1	Jai Hindley (AUS)	Bora–Hansgrohe	86h 07' 19"
2	Richard Carapaz (ECU)	INEOS Grenadiers	+ 1' 25"
3	Mikel Landa (ESP)	Team Bahrain Victorious	+ 1' 51"
4	Vincenzo Nibali (ITA)	Astana Qazaqstan Team	+ 7' 57"
5	Pello Bilbao (ESP)	Team Bahrain Victorious	+ 8' 55"
6	Jan Hirt (CZE)	Intermarché–Wanty–Gobert Matériaux	+ 9' 07"
7	Emanuel Buchmann (GER)	Bora–Hansgrohe	+ 11' 18"
8	Domenico Pozzovivo (ITA)	Intermarché–Wanty–Gobert Matériaux	+ 16' 04"
9	Juan Pedro López (ESP)	Trek–Segafredo	+ 17' 29"
10	Hugh Carthy (GBR)	EF Education–EasyPost	+ 17' 56"

== Stage 21 ==
29 May 2022 — Verona (Cronometro delle Colline Veronesi), 17.4 km (10.8 mi) (ITT)

For the fourth successive edition, the Giro ended with an individual time trial, with the riders tackling a 17.4-kilometre (10.8 mi) course in Verona. The first 4.9 kilometres (3.0 mi) were flat before the riders went up the fourth-category climb of Torricella Massimiliana, which is 4.1 kilometres (2.5 mi) long with an average of 5.4 per cent. The riders went through the only intermediate time check at the top of the climb with 7.9 kilometres (4.9 mi) left. The riders descended until there were 3.6 kilometres (2.2 mi) remaining before tackling a short flat section towards the finish in Piazza Bra.

As is customary for time trials, the riders set off in reverse order of their GC placings, with Roger Kluge (Lotto–Soudal) the first rider to go down the start ramp. The first rider to set a benchmark time was Julius van den Berg (EF Education–EasyPost), who set a time of 24' 53". However, his time was soon smashed by Michael Hepburn (Team BikeExchange–Jayco), going through the course a minute faster with a time of 23' 48". Edoardo Affini (Team Jumbo–Visma) was one of the favorites for the stage win, but he fell short of beating Hepburn's time by six seconds. Eventually, Magnus Cort (EF Education–EasyPost) went into the hot seat after finishing in 23' 42", six seconds faster than Hepburn. Mauro Schmid (Quick-Step Alpha Vinyl Team) ended up going a second faster than Cort, but by the time he finished, the Italian time trial champion, Matteo Sobrero (Team BikeExchange–Jayco), was flying through the course. Sobrero took the fastest time at the time check before finishing with a time of 22' 24". Only two riders came to within less than a minute of his time as Thymen Arensman (Team DSM) and Mathieu van der Poel (Alpecin–Fenix) were 23 and 40 seconds down, respectively. This meant that Sobrero won his first Grand Tour stage. Meanwhile, Arnaud Démare (Groupama–FDJ) and Koen Bouwman (Team Jumbo–Visma) safely finished to confirm their victories in the points and mountains classifications, respectively.

The battle soon shifted to the GC contenders as some spots in the top ten were still set to be decided. In the battle for the ninth spot, Juan Pedro López (Trek–Segafredo) led Hugh Carthy (EF Education–EasyPost) by only 27 seconds. Carthy, who finished 11th on the stage, took more than a minute to pass the Spaniard into ninth but López did go home with the maglia bianca as the best young rider. Emanuel Buchmann (Bora–Hansgrohe) and Domenico Pozzovivo (Intermarché–Wanty–Gobert Matériaux) safely negotiated the stage to retain their seventh and eighth spots, respectively. Meanwhile, Jan Hirt (Intermarché–Wanty–Gobert Matériaux) trailed Pello Bilbao (Team Bahrain Victorious) by only 12 seconds for fifth on GC. Both riders were evenly matched but Bilbao finished two seconds ahead to retain his fifth place. Both riders also came close to overtaking Vincenzo Nibali (Astana Qazaqstan Team), who was almost a minute slower but retained his fourth place. In the battle for second place, Mikel Landa (Team Bahrain Victorious) was 26 seconds behind Richard Carapaz (INEOS Grenadiers). However, Carapaz finished tenth on the stage, taking more than a minute and a half on Landa. The last rider off the start ramp was Jai Hindley (Bora–Hansgrohe), the race leader. He safely went through the course, finishing in 15th with a time of 23' 55", more than enough to keep the maglia rosa and win the Giro. This marked his first Grand Tour victory and he became the first Australian to win the Giro. The traditional prize-giving commenced shortly afterwards.

Stage 21 Result
Rank	Rider	Team	Time
1	Matteo Sobrero (ITA)	Team BikeExchange–Jayco	22' 24"
2	Thymen Arensman (NED)	Team DSM	+ 23"
3	Mathieu van der Poel (NED)	Alpecin–Fenix	+ 40"
4	Bauke Mollema (NED)	Trek–Segafredo	+ 1' 08"
5	Ben Tulett (GBR)	INEOS Grenadiers	+ 1' 12"
6	Mauro Schmid (SUI)	Quick-Step Alpha Vinyl Team	+ 1' 17"
7	Magnus Cort (DEN)	EF Education–EasyPost	+ 1' 18"
8	Tobias Foss (NOR)	Team Jumbo–Visma	+ 1' 19"
9	Michael Hepburn (AUS)	Team BikeExchange–Jayco	+ 1' 24"
10	Richard Carapaz (ECU)	INEOS Grenadiers	+ 1' 24"

Final general classification
Rank	Rider	Team	Time
1	Jai Hindley (AUS)	Bora–Hansgrohe	86h 31' 14"
2	Richard Carapaz (ECU)	INEOS Grenadiers	+ 1' 18"
3	Mikel Landa (ESP)	Team Bahrain Victorious	+ 3' 24"
4	Vincenzo Nibali (ITA)	Astana Qazaqstan Team	+ 9' 02"
5	Pello Bilbao (ESP)	Team Bahrain Victorious	+ 9' 14"
6	Jan Hirt (CZE)	Intermarché–Wanty–Gobert Matériaux	+ 9' 28"
7	Emanuel Buchmann (GER)	Bora–Hansgrohe	+ 13' 19"
8	Domenico Pozzovivo (ITA)	Intermarché–Wanty–Gobert Matériaux	+ 17' 29"
9	Hugh Carthy (GBR)	EF Education–EasyPost	+ 17' 54"
10	Juan Pedro López (ESP)	Trek–Segafredo	+ 18' 40"
