= Jorge Arcas =

Spanish cyclist

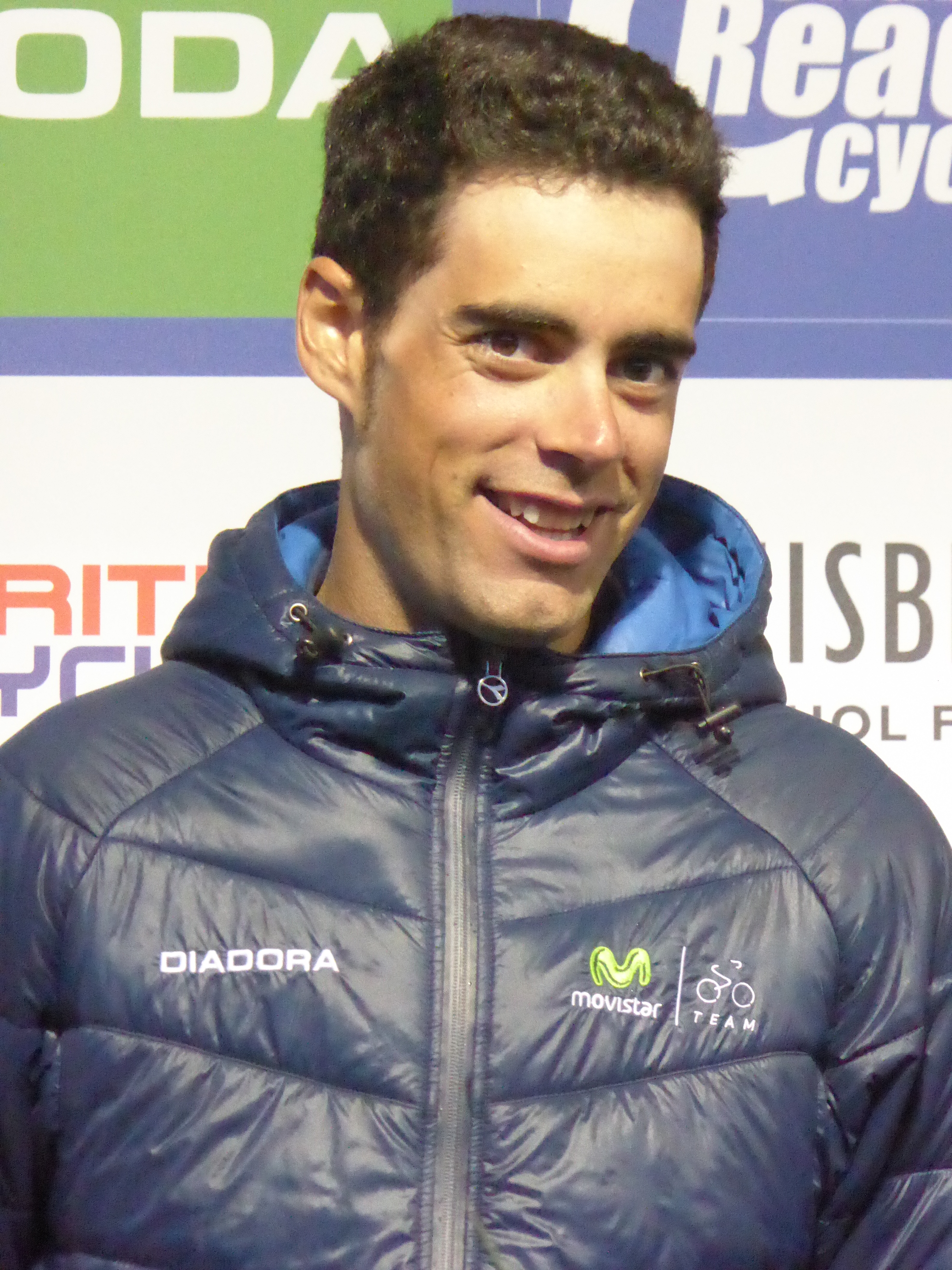
- Arcas at the 2016 Tour of Britain.

Personal information
- Full name: Jorge Arcas Peña
- Born: 8 July 1992 (age 34) Sabiñánigo, Spain
- Height: 1.87 m (6 ft 2 in)
- Weight: 68 kg (150 lb)

Cycling career
- Sport: Cycling
- Current team: Movistar Team
- Discipline: Road
- Role: Rider

Amateur team
- 2011–2015: Lizarte

Professional team
- 2016–: Movistar Team

Jorge Arcas Peña (born 8 July 1992) is a Spanish cyclist, who currently rides for UCI WorldTeam Movistar Team. He was named in the startlist for the 2017 Vuelta a España.

== Major results ==
2015
1st Stage 2 Vuelta a Navarra
2nd Vuelta Ciclista a León

=== Grand Tour general classification results timeline ===
Grand Tour	2017	2018	2019	2020	2021	2022	2023
Giro d'Italia	—	—	—	—	—	60	—
Tour de France	—	—	—	—	90	—	—
Vuelta a España	DNF	—	93	77	—	—	87

Legend
—	Did not compete
DNF	Did not finish
