= Andrii Ponomar =

Ukrainian cyclist (born 2002)

- Ponomar in 2026

Personal information
- Born: 5 September 2002 (age 24) Chernihiv, Ukraine
- Height: 1.85 m (6 ft 1 in)
- Weight: 65 kg (143 lb; 10 st 3 lb)

Cycling career
- Sport: Cycling
- Current team: General Store–Essegibi–Fratelli Curia
- Discipline: Road
- Role: Rider

Amateur team
- 2020: Team Franco Ballerini Due C

Professional teams
- 2021–2022: Androni Giocattoli–Sidermec
- 2023: Arkéa–Samsic
- 2023–2024: Team Corratec–Selle Italia
- 2025–2026: Petrolike
- 2026–: General Store–Essegibi–Fratelli Curia

Major wins
- One-day races and Classics National Road Race Championships (2021)

Andrii Vyacheslavovych Ponomar (Ukrainian: Андрій В’ячеславович Пономар; born 5 September 2002) is a Ukrainian cyclist, who currently rides for UCI Continental team General Store–Essegibi–Fratelli Curia.

== Career ==
In May 2021, he was named in the startlist for the 2021 Giro d'Italia, he is the youngest rider to compete since 1929. Ponomar won his first professional race in 2021, the Ukrainian national road race championship.

On 31 July 2023, Ponomar mutually terminated his contract with Arkéa–Samsic, as Ponomar chose to stay in Italy to be closer to his family.

== Major results ==
2018
3rd Time trial, National Junior Road Championships
2019
National Junior Road Championships

1st Time trial
1st Road race

UEC European Junior Road Championships

1st Road race
8th Time trial

1st Stage 3 Trophée Centre Morbihan
4th Overall La Coupe du President de la Ville de Grudziądz
5th Overall Saarland Trofeo

1st Stage 2

6th Overall Course de la Paix Juniors
2020
1st Overall Grand Prix Rüebliland

1st Stage 1

2021
1st Road race, National Road Championships
1st Young rider classification, Belgrade–Banja Luka
2022
10th Giro della Toscana
2024
2nd Trofeo Città di Brescia
8th Giro del Medio Brenta
2025
2nd Giro dell'Appennino
10th Memorial Marco Pantani
2026
1st Gran Premio Colli Rovescalesi
4th Giro dell'Appennino

=== Grand Tour general classification results timeline ===
Grand Tour	2021	2022
Giro d'Italia	67	117
Tour de France	—	—
Vuelta a España	—	—

Legend
—	Did not compete
DNF	Did not finish
