= Luca Rastelli =

Italian cyclist

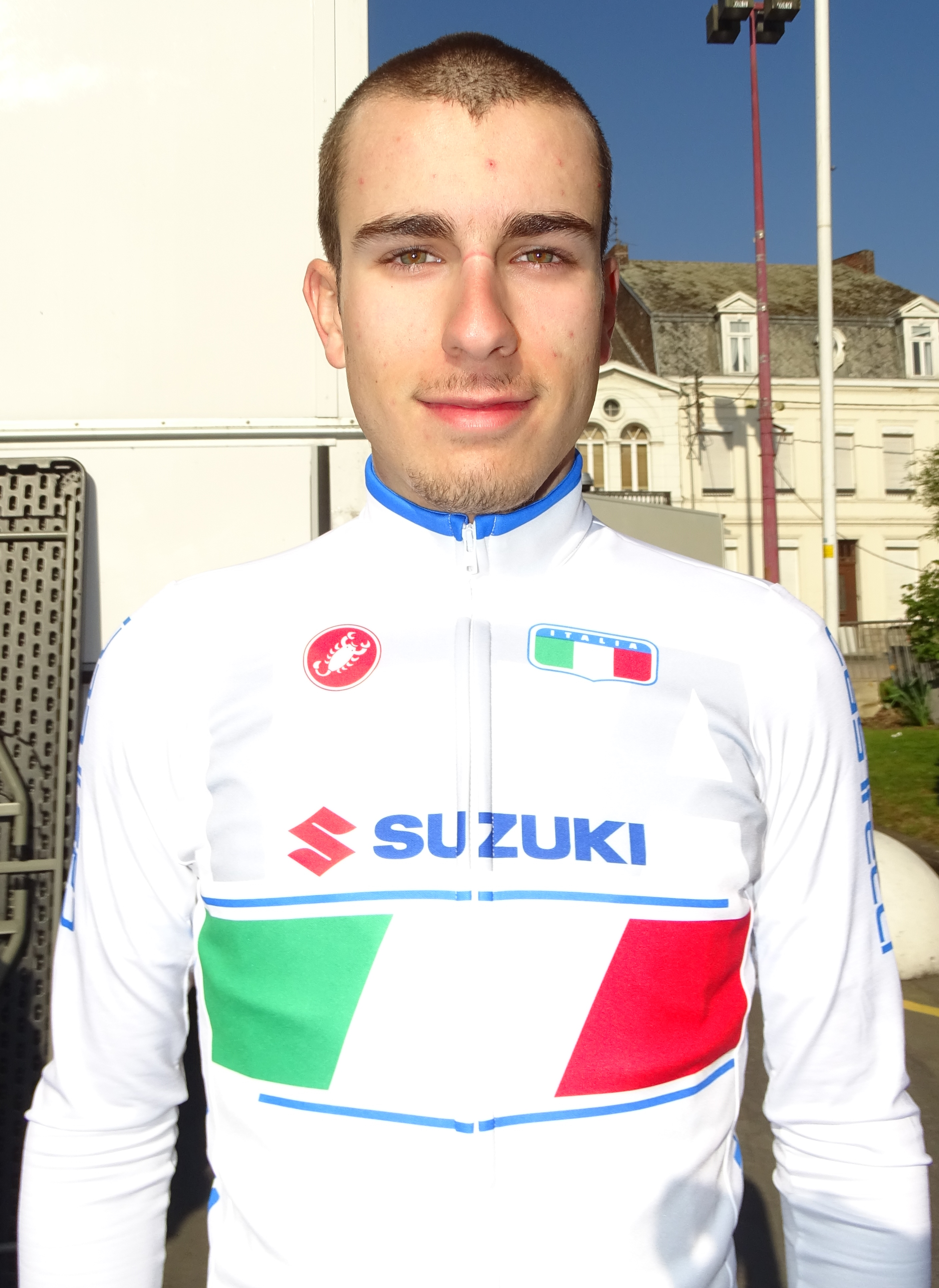
- Rastelli in 2017

Personal information
- Born: 29 December 1999 (age 26) Cremona, Italy
- Height: 1.75 m (5 ft 9 in)

Cycling career
- Sport: Cycling
- Current team: Retired
- Discipline: Road
- Role: Rider

Amateur teams
- 2013–2015: CC Cremonese 1891 Gruppo Arvedi
- 2016: GB Junior
- 2017: CC Cremonese 1891 Gruppo Arvedi–GB
- 2019: Delio Gallina Colosio Eurofeed

Professional teams
- 2018: Biesse–Carrera Gavardo
- 2020–2021: Team Colpack–Ballan
- 2022–2023: Bardiani–CSF–Faizanè
- 2024: Work Service–Vitalcare–Dynatek

Luca Rastelli (born 29 December 1999) is an Italian former racing cyclist, who competed as a professional from 2018 to January 2024.

== Major results ==
2017
2nd Road race, UCI Junior Road World Championships
2nd Trofeo Citta di Loano
3rd Time trial, National Junior Road Championships
6th Trofeo Buffoni
8th Trofeo Emilio Paganessi
9th Montichiari–Roncone
2018
7th Gran Premio Industrie del Marmo
2019
2nd Coppa della Pace
5th Visegrad 4 Kerékpárverseny
10th Ruota d'Oro
2021
2nd Coppa Collecchio

=== Grand Tour general classification results timeline ===
Grand Tour	2022
Giro d'Italia	106
Tour de France	—
Vuelta a España	—

Legend
—	Did not compete
DNF	Did not finish
