= 2022 Giro d'Italia =

Cycling competition

2022 UCI World Tour, race 20 of 32
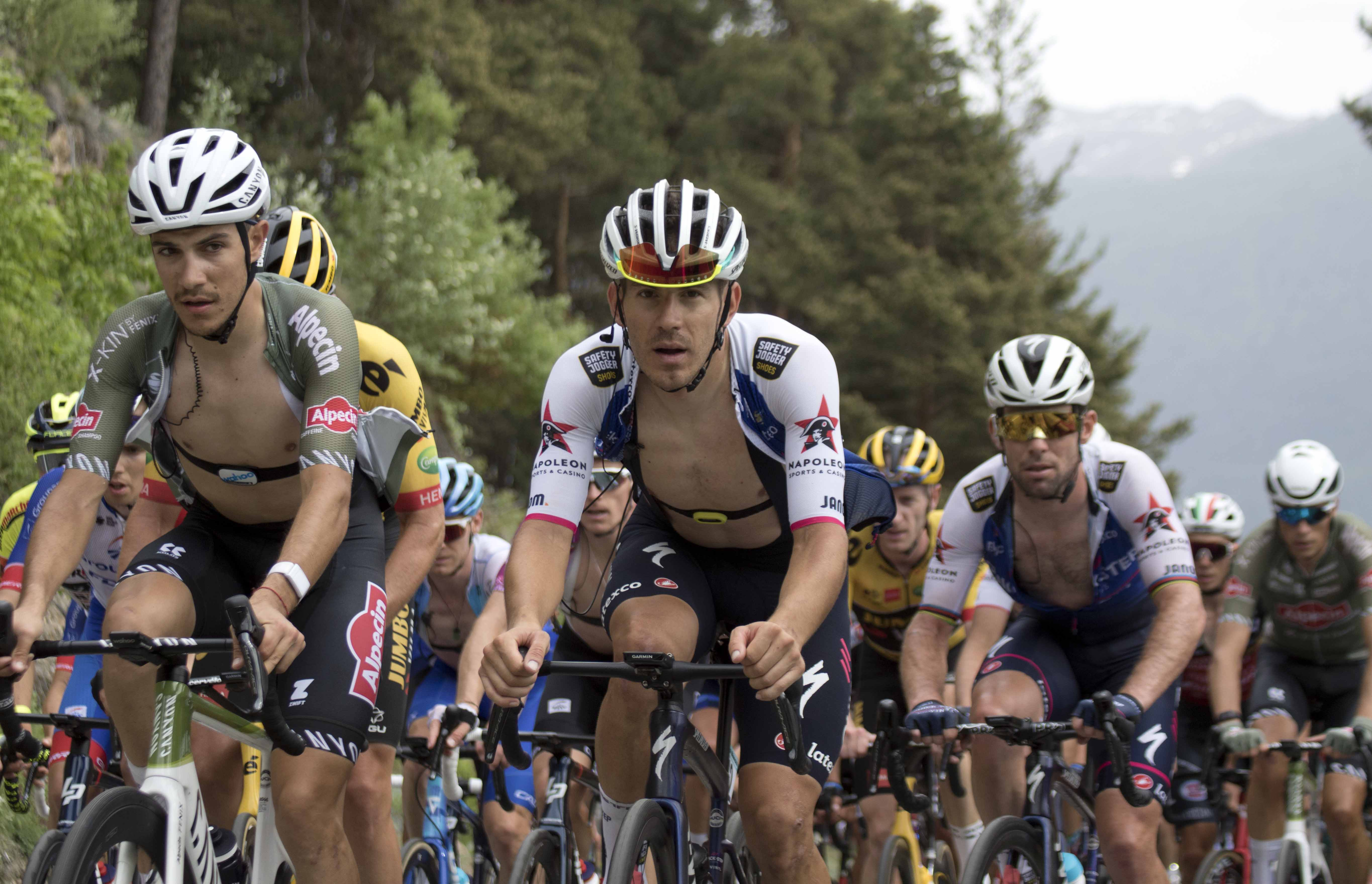
- The Gruppetto on Stage 15

Race details
- Dates: 6–29 May 2022
- Stages: 21
- Distance: 3,445.6 km (2,141.0 mi)
- Winning time: 86h 31' 14"

Results
Jersey awarded to the overall winner	Winner	Jai Hindley (AUS)	(Bora–Hansgrohe)
	Second	Richard Carapaz (ECU)	(INEOS Grenadiers)
	Third	Mikel Landa (ESP)	(Team Bahrain Victorious)
Jersey awarded to the points classification winner	Points	Arnaud Démare (FRA)	(Groupama–FDJ)
Jersey awarded to the mountains classification winner	Mountains	Koen Bouwman (NED)	(Team Jumbo–Visma)
Jersey awarded to the young rider classification winner	Young rider	Juan Pedro López Pérez (ESP)	(Trek–Segafredo)
	Sprints	Filippo Tagliani (ITA)	(Drone Hopper–Androni Giocattoli)
Jersey awarded to the combativity classification winner	Combativity	Mathieu van der Poel (NED)	(Alpecin–Fenix)
	Team	Team Bahrain Victorious	

The 2022 Giro d'Italia was the 105th edition of the Giro d'Italia, a three-week Grand Tour cycling stage race. The race started on 6 May in Budapest, Hungary, and finished on 29 May in Verona, Italy.

The race was won by Jai Hindley of Bora–Hansgrohe, taking his first Grand Tour victory and becoming the first Australian to win the Giro. Hindley came into the race as one of his team's three potential GC leaders before taking the team leadership when he won stage 9, which finished atop Blockhaus. Over the last half of the race, he emerged as one of the strongest climbers, staying within ten seconds of the race lead until stage 20 to Marmolada. On that stage, he rode away from the rest of the contenders on the final climb to move into the race lead, which he kept in the final day time trial. Second place went to Richard Carapaz of INEOS Grenadiers. Carapaz took the maglia rosa on stage 14, holding a slim advantage over Hindley. The two were inseparable until the penultimate stage, when Carapaz was dropped inside the final three kilometres. He dropped to second place, which he solidified in the final day time trial. Third place went to Mikel Landa of Team Bahrain Victorious. He performed consistently in the mountains, emerging as one of the strongest climbers in the race to take his first podium result in a Grand Tour since the 2015 Giro.

In the race's other classifications, Arnaud Démare of Groupama–FDJ won the points classification. He was the race's best sprinter, winning three sprint stages along the way. Koen Bouwman of Team Jumbo–Visma won the mountains classification while also winning two stages from the breakaway. Juan Pedro López of Trek–Segafredo won the young rider classification. Apart from finishing in the top ten, López also held the maglia rosa for ten days before losing it to Carapaz midway through the race. Team Bahrain Victorious took both the teams classification and the fair play classification. Filippo Tagliani of Drone Hopper–Androni Giocattoli won the intermediate sprint classification for taking the most points in intermediate sprints while his teammate, Mattia Bais, took the breakaway classification for spending the greatest number of kilometres in the break. Meanwhile, Mathieu van der Poel of Alpecin–Fenix won the combativity classification. He also won the first stage and held the maglia rosa for the first three days before getting into multiple breaks over the rest of the race.

== Teams ==
Although Arkéa–Samsic are invited to all UCI World Tour events, they declined their invitation to this year's Giro deciding to focus on the Tour de France and the Vuelta a España.

UCI WorldTeams

- AG2R Citroën Team
- Astana Qazaqstan Team
- Bora–Hansgrohe
- Cofidis
- EF Education–EasyPost
- Groupama–FDJ
- INEOS Grenadiers
- Intermarché–Wanty–Gobert Matériaux
- Israel–Premier Tech
- Lotto–Soudal
- Movistar Team
- Quick-Step Alpha Vinyl Team
- Team Bahrain Victorious
- Team BikeExchange–Jayco
- Team DSM
- Team Jumbo–Visma
- Trek–Segafredo
- UAE Team Emirates

UCI ProTeams

- Bardiani–CSF–Faizanè
- Drone Hopper–Androni Giocattoli
- Eolo–Kometa
- Alpecin–Fenix

== Pre-race favourites ==
Richard Carapaz (INEOS Grenadiers), the 2019 champion, was considered the pre-race favourite, followed by Simon Yates (Team BikeExchange–Jayco) and João Almeida (UAE Team Emirates). Their closest challengers were seen to be Miguel Ángel López (Astana Qazaqstan Team), Mikel Landa (Team Bahrain Victorious) and 2017 champion Tom Dumoulin (Team Jumbo–Visma). Other contenders were considered to be Wilco Kelderman (Bora–Hansgrohe), Romain Bardet (Team DSM) and Hugh Carthy (EF Education–EasyPost). Defending champion Egan Bernal did not participate, as he had not recovered from injuries suffered on a training ride during the offseason.

Riders believed to be the main contenders for victories on the sprint stages were Mark Cavendish (Quick-Step Alpha Vinyl Team), Mathieu van der Poel (Alpecin–Fenix), Arnaud Démare (Groupama–FDJ), and Caleb Ewan (Lotto–Soudal).

== Route and stages ==
Stage characteristics and winners
Stage	Date	Course	Distance	Type	Winner
1	6 May	Budapest (Hungary) to Visegrád (Hungary)	195 km (121 mi)	Flat stage	Mathieu van der Poel (NED)
2	7 May	Budapest (Hungary)	9.2 km (5.7 mi)	Individual time trial	Simon Yates (GBR)
3	8 May	Kaposvár (Hungary) to Balatonfüred (Hungary)	201 km (125 mi)	Flat stage	Mark Cavendish (GBR)
	9 May	Avola		Rest day	
4	10 May	Avola to Etna (Rif. Sapienza)	172 km (107 mi)	Mountain stage	Lennard Kämna (GER)
5	11 May	Catania to Messina	174 km (108 mi)	Flat stage	Arnaud Démare (FRA)
6	12 May	Palmi to Scalea (Riviera dei Cedri)	192 km (119 mi)	Flat stage	Arnaud Démare (FRA)
7	13 May	Diamante to Potenza	196 km (122 mi)	Intermediate stage	Koen Bouwman (NED)
8	14 May	Naples to Naples (Procida Capitale Italiana della Cultura)	153 km (95 mi)	Hilly stage	Thomas De Gendt (BEL)
9	15 May	Isernia to Blockhaus	191 km (119 mi)	Mountain stage	Jai Hindley (AUS)
	16 May	Pescara		Rest day	
10	17 May	Pescara to Jesi	196 km (122 mi)	Hilly stage	Biniam Girmay (ERI)
11	18 May	Santarcangelo di Romagna to Reggio Emilia	203 km (126 mi)	Flat stage	Alberto Dainese (ITA)
12	19 May	Parma to Genoa	204 km (127 mi)	Intermediate stage	Stefano Oldani (ITA)
13	20 May	Sanremo to Cuneo	150 km (93 mi)	Flat stage	Arnaud Démare (FRA)
14	21 May	Santena to Turin	147 km (91 mi)	Mountain stage	Simon Yates (GBR)
15	22 May	Rivarolo Canavese to Cogne	178 km (111 mi)	Mountain stage	Giulio Ciccone (ITA)
	23 May	Salò		Rest day	
16	24 May	Salò to Aprica (Sforzato Wine Stage)	202 km (126 mi)	Mountain stage	Jan Hirt (CZE)
17	25 May	Ponte di Legno to Lavarone	168 km (104 mi)	Mountain stage	Santiago Buitrago (COL)
18	26 May	Borgo Valsugana to Treviso	156 km (97 mi)	Flat stage	Dries De Bondt (BEL)
19	27 May	Marano Lagunare to Santuario di Castelmonte	177 km (110 mi)	Mountain stage	Koen Bouwman (NED)
20	28 May	Belluno to Marmolada (Passo Fedaia)	168 km (104 mi)	Mountain stage	Alessandro Covi (ITA)
21	29 May	Verona (Cronometro delle Colline Veronesi)	17.4 km (10.8 mi)	Individual time trial	Matteo Sobrero (ITA)
Total			3,449.6 km (2,143.5 mi)		

== Classification leadership ==
Classification leadership by stage
Stage	Winner	General classification	Points classification	Mountains classification	Young rider classification	General Super Team	Intermediate sprint classification	Combativity classification	Breakaway classification	Fair play classification
1	Mathieu van der Poel	Mathieu van der Poel	Mathieu van der Poel	Mathieu van der Poel	Biniam Girmay	INEOS Grenadiers	Filippo Tagliani	Lennard Kämna	Mattia Bais	Alpecin–Fenix
2	Simon Yates	Mathieu van der Poel	Mathieu van der Poel	Mathieu van der Poel	Matteo Sobrero	Team Jumbo–Visma	Mattia Bais	Rick Zabel	Mattia Bais	Alpecin–Fenix
3	Mark Cavendish	Mathieu van der Poel	Mathieu van der Poel	Rick Zabel	Matteo Sobrero	Team Jumbo–Visma	Filippo Tagliani	Mattia Bais	Mattia Bais	Alpecin–Fenix
4	Lennard Kämna	Juan Pedro López	Mathieu van der Poel	Lennard Kämna	Juan Pedro López	Bora–Hansgrohe	Filippo Tagliani	Stefano Oldani	Mattia Bais	Trek–Segafredo
5	Arnaud Démare	Juan Pedro López	Arnaud Démare	Lennard Kämna	Juan Pedro López	Bora–Hansgrohe	Filippo Tagliani	Mattia Bais	Mattia Bais	Trek–Segafredo
6	Arnaud Démare	Juan Pedro López	Arnaud Démare	Lennard Kämna	Juan Pedro López	Bora–Hansgrohe	Filippo Tagliani	Diego Rosa	Mattia Bais	Trek–Segafredo
7	Koen Bouwman	Juan Pedro López	Arnaud Démare	Koen Bouwman	Juan Pedro López	Trek–Segafredo	Filippo Tagliani	Tom Dumoulin	Mattia Bais	Trek–Segafredo
8	Thomas De Gendt	Juan Pedro López	Arnaud Démare	Koen Bouwman	Juan Pedro López	Intermarché–Wanty–Gobert Matériaux	Filippo Tagliani	Thomas De Gendt	Mattia Bais	Bora–Hansgrohe
9	Jai Hindley	Juan Pedro López	Arnaud Démare	Diego Rosa	Juan Pedro López	Bora–Hansgrohe	Filippo Tagliani	João Almeida	Mattia Bais	Team DSM
10	Biniam Girmay	Juan Pedro López	Arnaud Démare	Diego Rosa	Juan Pedro López	Bora–Hansgrohe	Filippo Tagliani	Alessandro De Marchi	Mattia Bais	Team DSM
11	Alberto Dainese	Juan Pedro López	Arnaud Démare	Diego Rosa	Juan Pedro López	Bora–Hansgrohe	Filippo Tagliani	Dries De Bondt	Mattia Bais	Team DSM
12	Stefano Oldani	Juan Pedro López	Arnaud Démare	Diego Rosa	Juan Pedro López	Intermarché–Wanty–Gobert Matériaux	Filippo Tagliani	Lorenzo Rota	Mattia Bais	Team DSM
13	Arnaud Démare	Juan Pedro López	Arnaud Démare	Diego Rosa	Juan Pedro López	Intermarché–Wanty–Gobert Matériaux	Filippo Tagliani	Pascal Eenkhoorn	Mattia Bais	Bora–Hansgrohe
14	Simon Yates	Richard Carapaz	Arnaud Démare	Diego Rosa	João Almeida	Bora–Hansgrohe	Filippo Tagliani	Richard Carapaz	Mattia Bais	Team Bahrain Victorious
15	Giulio Ciccone	Richard Carapaz	Arnaud Démare	Koen Bouwman	João Almeida	Bora–Hansgrohe	Filippo Tagliani	Giulio Ciccone	Mattia Bais	Team Bahrain Victorious
16	Jan Hirt	Richard Carapaz	Arnaud Démare	Koen Bouwman	João Almeida	Bora–Hansgrohe	Filippo Tagliani	Thymen Arensman	Mattia Bais	Team Bahrain Victorious
17	Santiago Buitrago	Richard Carapaz	Arnaud Démare	Koen Bouwman	João Almeida	Team Bahrain Victorious	Filippo Tagliani	Mathieu van der Poel	Mattia Bais	Team Bahrain Victorious
18	Dries De Bondt	Richard Carapaz	Arnaud Démare	Koen Bouwman	Juan Pedro López	Team Bahrain Victorious	Filippo Tagliani	Edoardo Affini	Mattia Bais	Team Bahrain Victorious
19	Koen Bouwman	Richard Carapaz	Arnaud Démare	Koen Bouwman	Juan Pedro López	Team Bahrain Victorious	Filippo Tagliani	Andrea Vendrame	Mattia Bais	Team Bahrain Victorious
20	Alessandro Covi	Jai Hindley	Arnaud Démare	Koen Bouwman	Juan Pedro López	Team Bahrain Victorious	Filippo Tagliani	Alessandro Covi	Mattia Bais	Team Bahrain Victorious
21	Matteo Sobrero	Jai Hindley	Arnaud Démare	Koen Bouwman	Juan Pedro López	Team Bahrain Victorious	Filippo Tagliani	Mathieu van der Poel	Mattia Bais	Team Bahrain Victorious
Final		Jai Hindley	Arnaud Démare	Koen Bouwman	Juan Pedro López	Team Bahrain Victorious	Filippo Tagliani	Mathieu van der Poel	Mattia Bais	Team Bahrain Victorious

- On stage 2, Pello Bilbao, who was third in the points classification, wore the cyclamen jersey, because first placed Mathieu van der Poel wore the pink jersey as leader of the general classification, and second placed Biniam Girmay wore the white jersey as the leader of the young rider classification. Additionally, Magnus Cort Nielsen wore the blue jersey, although Van der Poel, Girmay and Bilbao were the only riders to score in the mountains classification until that point.
- On stages 3 and 4, Biniam Girmay, who was second in the points classification, wore the cyclamen jersey, because first placed Mathieu van der Poel wore the pink jersey as leader of the general classification. Because Van der Poel also led the mountains classification before stage 3, Rick Zabel, who was second in the mountains classification, wore the blue jersey on that stage.
- On stages 5–9, Mauri Vansevenant, who was second in the young riders classification, wore the white jersey, because first placed Juan Pedro López wore the pink jersey as leader of the general classification. On stages 10–14, João Almeida wore the white jersey for the same reason.
- On stage 18, Juan Pedro López, who was second in the young riders classification, wore the white jersey, because first placed João Almeida withdrew before the start of the stage.

== Final classification standings ==
Legend
A pink jersey.	Denotes the winner of the general classification	A blue jersey.	Denotes the winner of the mountains classification
A violet jersey.	Denotes the winner of the points classification	A white jersey.	Denotes the winner of the young rider classification
A white jersey with a red number bib.	Denotes the winner of the combativity award		

=== General classification ===
Final general classification (1–10)
Rank	Rider	Team	Time
1	Jai Hindley (AUS)	Bora–Hansgrohe	86h 31' 14"
2	Richard Carapaz (ECU)	INEOS Grenadiers	+ 1' 18"
3	Mikel Landa (ESP)	Team Bahrain Victorious	+ 3' 24"
4	Vincenzo Nibali (ITA)	Astana Qazaqstan Team	+ 9' 02"
5	Pello Bilbao (ESP)	Team Bahrain Victorious	+ 9' 14"
6	Jan Hirt (CZE)	Intermarché–Wanty–Gobert Matériaux	+ 9' 28"
7	Emanuel Buchmann (GER)	Bora–Hansgrohe	+ 13' 19"
8	Domenico Pozzovivo (ITA)	Intermarché–Wanty–Gobert Matériaux	+ 17' 29"
9	Hugh Carthy (GBR)	EF Education–EasyPost	+ 17' 54"
10	Juan Pedro López (ESP)	Trek–Segafredo	+ 18' 40"

Final general classification (11–149)
Rank	Rider	Team	Time
11	Alejandro Valverde (ESP)	Movistar Team	+ 23' 24"
12	Santiago Buitrago (COL)	Team Bahrain Victorious	+ 24' 23"
13	Lucas Hamilton (AUS)	Team BikeExchange–Jayco	+ 28' 02"
14	Guillaume Martin (FRA)	Cofidis	+ 28' 37"
15	Lorenzo Fortunato (ITA)	Eolo–Kometa	+ 33' 15"
16	Pavel Sivakov (FRA)	INEOS Grenadiers	+ 41' 43"
17	Wilco Kelderman (NED)	Bora–Hansgrohe	+ 41' 45"
18	Thymen Arensman (NED)	Team DSM	+ 42' 31"
19	Lennard Kämna (GER)	Bora–Hansgrohe	+ 43' 58"
20	Sam Oomen (NED)	Team Jumbo–Visma	+ 1h 04' 22"
21	Koen Bouwman (NED)	Team Jumbo–Visma	+ 1h 06' 03"
22	Joe Dombrowski (USA)	Astana Qazaqstan Team	+ 1h 12' 21"
23	Mikaël Cherel (FRA)	AG2R Citroën Team	+ 1h 22' 20"
24	Luca Covili (ITA)	Bardiani–CSF–Faizanè	+ 1h 30' 24"
25	Giulio Ciccone (ITA)	Trek–Segafredo	+ 1h 32' 25"
26	Bauke Mollema (NED)	Trek–Segafredo	+ 1h 39' 47"
27	Antonio Pedrero (ESP)	Movistar Team	+ 1h 50' 13"
28	Gijs Leemreize (NED)	Team Jumbo–Visma	+ 1h 59' 40"
29	Vadim Pronskiy (KAZ)	Astana Qazaqstan Team	+ 2h 03' 10"
30	Mauri Vansevenant (BEL)	Quick-Step Alpha Vinyl Team	+ 2h 03' 44"
31	Domen Novak (SLO)	Team Bahrain Victorious	+ 2h 08' 46"
32	Lorenzo Rota (ITA)	Intermarché–Wanty–Gobert Matériaux	+ 2h 09' 53"
33	Damien Howson (AUS)	Team BikeExchange–Jayco	+ 2h 14' 31"
34	Wout Poels (NED)	Team Bahrain Victorious	+ 2h 15' 18"
35	Attila Valter (HUN)	Groupama–FDJ	+ 2h 15' 53"
36	Davide Formolo (ITA)	UAE Team Emirates	+ 2h 20' 58"
37	Diego Ulissi (ITA)	UAE Team Emirates	+ 2h 26' 30"
38	Ben Tulett (GBR)	INEOS Grenadiers	+ 2h 27' 26"
39	Chris Hamilton (AUS)	Team DSM	+ 2h 29' 45"
40	Mattias Skjelmose Jensen (DEN)	Trek–Segafredo	+ 2h 33' 10"
41	Fabio Felline (ITA)	Astana Qazaqstan Team	+ 2h 36' 40"
42	Jhonatan Narváez (ECU)	INEOS Grenadiers	+ 2h 37' 05"
43	Martijn Tusveld (NED)	Team DSM	+ 2h 38' 00"
44	Rui Costa (POR)	UAE Team Emirates	+ 2h 38' 11"
45	Alessandro Covi (ITA)	UAE Team Emirates	+ 2h 50' 07"
46	Rein Taaramäe (EST)	Intermarché–Wanty–Gobert Matériaux	+ 2h 51' 22"
47	Filippo Zana (ITA)	Bardiani–CSF–Faizanè	+ 2h 53' 56"
48	Sylvain Moniquet (BEL)	Lotto–Soudal	+ 2h 54' 15"
49	Iván Ramiro Sosa (COL)	Movistar Team	+ 2h 55' 35"
50	Felix Gall (AUT)	AG2R Citroën Team	+ 2h 58' 05"
51	Ben Zwiehoff (GER)	Bora–Hansgrohe	+ 2h 59' 37"
52	Alessandro Tonelli (ITA)	Bardiani–CSF–Faizanè	+ 3h 04' 45"
53	Davide Gabburo (ITA)	Bardiani–CSF–Faizanè	+ 3h 09' 09"
54	Tobias Foss (NOR)	Team Jumbo–Visma	+ 3h 09' 19"
55	Andrea Vendrame (ITA)	AG2R Citroën Team	+ 3h 10' 26"
56	Harold Tejada (COL)	Astana Qazaqstan Team	+ 3h 12' 38"
57	Mathieu van der Poel (NED)	Alpecin–Fenix	+ 3h 14' 39"
58	Nans Peters (FRA)	AG2R Citroën Team	+ 3h 16' 00"
59	Will Barta (USA)	Movistar Team	+ 3h 16' 57"
60	Jorge Arcas (ESP)	Movistar Team	+ 3h 18' 44"
61	Merhawi Kudus (ERI)	EF Education–EasyPost	+ 3h 19' 16"
62	Pascal Eenkhoorn (NED)	Team Jumbo–Visma	+ 3h 21' 01"
63	Davide Villella (ITA)	Cofidis	+ 3h 23' 54"
64	Jonathan Castroviejo (ESP)	INEOS Grenadiers	+ 3h 24' 18"
65	Nicolas Prodhomme (FRA)	AG2R Citroën Team	+ 3h 27' 00"
66	Ben Swift (GBR)	INEOS Grenadiers	+ 3h 27' 26"
67	Francesco Gavazzi (ITA)	Eolo–Kometa	+ 3h 35' 13"
68	Vincenzo Albanese (ITA)	Eolo–Kometa	+ 3h 35' 53"
69	José Joaquín Rojas (ESP)	Movistar Team	+ 3h 37' 21"
70	Matteo Sobrero (ITA)	Team BikeExchange–Jayco	+ 3h 44' 44"
71	Rémy Rochas (FRA)	Cofidis	+ 3h 46' 28"
72	Giovanni Aleotti (ITA)	Bora–Hansgrohe	+ 3h 48' 32"
73	Dario Cataldo (ITA)	Trek–Segafredo	+ 3h 49' 24"
74	Thomas De Gendt (BEL)	Lotto–Soudal	+ 3h 49' 52"
75	Mauro Schmid (SUI)	Quick-Step Alpha Vinyl Team	+ 3h 52' 22"
76	Eduardo Sepúlveda (ARG)	Drone Hopper–Androni Giocattoli	+ 3h 54' 40"
77	Diego Rosa (ITA)	Eolo–Kometa	+ 3h 58' 26"
78	Edoardo Zardini (ITA)	Drone Hopper–Androni Giocattoli	+ 4h 03' 18"
79	Diego Andrés Camargo (COL)	EF Education–EasyPost	+ 4h 05' 46"
80	Callum Scotson (AUS)	Team BikeExchange–Jayco	+ 4h 05' 51"
81	James Knox (GBR)	Quick-Step Alpha Vinyl Team	+ 4h 09' 18"
82	Mattia Bais (ITA)	Drone Hopper–Androni Giocattoli	+ 4h 12' 26"
83	Erik Fetter (HUN)	Eolo–Kometa	+ 4h 12' 51"
84	Stefano Oldani (ITA)	Alpecin–Fenix	+ 4h 13' 50"
85	Salvatore Puccio (ITA)	INEOS Grenadiers	+ 4h 14' 36"
86	Lilian Calmejane (FRA)	AG2R Citroën Team	+ 4h 17' 30"
87	Jasha Sütterlin (GER)	Team Bahrain Victorious	+ 4h 23' 10"
88	Anthony Perez (FRA)	Cofidis	+ 4h 26' 42"
89	Jos van Emden (NED)	Team Jumbo–Visma	+ 4h 31' 35"
90	Jaakko Hänninen (FIN)	AG2R Citroën Team	+ 4h 32' 32"
91	Simone Ravanelli (ITA)	Drone Hopper–Androni Giocattoli	+ 4h 32' 42"
92	Alessandro De Marchi (ITA)	Israel–Premier Tech	+ 4h 34' 50"
93	Christopher Juul-Jensen (DEN)	Team BikeExchange–Jayco	+ 4h 41' 31"
94	Pierre-Luc Périchon (FRA)	Cofidis	+ 4h 43' 35"
95	Magnus Cort (DEN)	EF Education–EasyPost	+ 4h 44' 51"
96	Mirco Maestri (ITA)	Eolo–Kometa	+ 4h 45' 59"
97	Edoardo Affini (ITA)	Team Jumbo–Visma	+ 4h 48' 11"
98	Oier Lazkano (ESP)	Movistar Team	+ 4h 52' 44"
99	Davide Ballerini (ITA)	Quick-Step Alpha Vinyl Team	+ 4h 56' 56"
100	Tobias Bayer (AUT)	Alpecin–Fenix	+ 4h 57' 16"
101	Alexander Cataford (CAN)	Israel–Premier Tech	+ 5h 01' 44"
102	Tobias Ludvigsson (SWE)	Groupama–FDJ	+ 5h 02' 16"
103	Jacopo Mosca (ITA)	Trek–Segafredo	+ 5h 03' 07"
104	Romain Combaud (FRA)	Team DSM	+ 5h 03' 35"
105	Aimé De Gendt (BEL)	Intermarché–Wanty–Gobert Matériaux	+ 5h 03' 53"
106	Luca Rastelli (ITA)	Bardiani–CSF–Faizanè	+ 5h 12' 56"
107	Lawson Craddock (USA)	Team BikeExchange–Jayco	+ 5h 13' 16"
108	Patrick Gamper (AUT)	Bora–Hansgrohe	+ 5h 13' 44"
109	Dries De Bondt (BEL)	Alpecin–Fenix	+ 5h 17' 20"
110	Barnabás Peák (HUN)	Intermarché–Wanty–Gobert Matériaux	+ 5h 19' 47"
111	Nico Denz (GER)	Team DSM	+ 5h 24' 09"
112	Michael Hepburn (AUS)	Team BikeExchange–Jayco	+ 5h 26' 35"
113	Oscar Riesebeek (NED)	Alpecin–Fenix	+ 5h 27' 57"
114	Sacha Modolo (ITA)	Bardiani–CSF–Faizanè	+ 5h 28' 00"
115	Ignatas Konovalovas (LTU)	Groupama–FDJ	+ 5h 30' 15"
116	Matthew Holmes (GBR)	Lotto–Soudal	+ 5h 33' 05"
117	Andrii Ponomar (UKR)	Drone Hopper–Androni Giocattoli	+ 5h 33' 47"
118	Senne Leysen (BEL)	Alpecin–Fenix	+ 5h 38' 59"
119	Otto Vergaerde (BEL)	Trek–Segafredo	+ 5h 39' 05"
120	Cesare Benedetti (POL)	Bora–Hansgrohe	+ 5h 41' 28"
121	Simone Consonni (ITA)	Cofidis	+ 5h 41' 36"
122	Alberto Dainese (ITA)	Team DSM	+ 5h 41' 37"
123	Jenthe Biermans (BEL)	Israel–Premier Tech	+ 5h 42' 24"
124	Lawrence Naesen (BEL)	AG2R Citroën Team	+ 5h 45' 54"
125	Davide Bais (ITA)	Eolo–Kometa	+ 5h 47' 49"
126	Samuele Rivi (ITA)	Eolo–Kometa	+ 5h 48' 28"
127	Miles Scotson (AUS)	Groupama–FDJ	+ 5h 48' 32"
128	Fernando Gaviria (COL)	UAE Team Emirates	+ 5h 50' 24"
129	Reto Hollenstein (SUI)	Israel–Premier Tech	+ 5h 51' 25"
130	Arnaud Démare (FRA)	Groupama–FDJ	+ 5h 54' 06"
131	Edward Theuns (BEL)	Trek–Segafredo	+ 5h 58' 13"
132	Ramon Sinkeldam (NED)	Groupama–FDJ	+ 6h 01' 25"
133	Michael Schwarzmann (GER)	Lotto–Soudal	+ 6h 08' 22"
134	Alex Dowsett (ITA)	Israel–Premier Tech	+ 6h 10' 38"
135	Davide Cimolai (ITA)	Cofidis	+ 6h 16' 34"
136	Jacopo Guarnieri (ITA)	Groupama–FDJ	+ 6h 16' 35"
137	Rick Zabel (GER)	Israel–Premier Tech	+ 6h 19' 48"
138	Phil Bauhaus (GER)	Team Bahrain Victorious	+ 6h 20' 13"
139	Wesley Kreder (NED)	Cofidis	+ 6h 22' 10"
140	Julius van den Berg (NED)	EF Education–EasyPost	+ 6h 24' 30"
141	Rui Oliveira (POR)	UAE Team Emirates	+ 6h 27' 39"
142	Maximiliano Richeze (ARG)	UAE Team Emirates	+ 6h 27' 58"
143	Filippo Tagliani (ITA)	Drone Hopper–Androni Giocattoli	+ 6h 29' 04"
144	Clément Davy (FRA)	Groupama–FDJ	+ 6h 34' 20"
145	Mark Cavendish (GBR)	Quick-Step Alpha Vinyl Team	+ 6h 46' 38"
146	Bert Van Lerberghe (BEL)	Quick-Step Alpha Vinyl Team	+ 6h 48' 50"
147	Matthias Brändle (AUT)	Israel–Premier Tech	+ 6h 52' 52"
148	Pieter Serry (BEL)	Quick-Step Alpha Vinyl Team	+ 6h 57' 02"
149	Roger Kluge (GER)	Lotto–Soudal	+ 7h 13' 57"

=== Points classification ===
Final points classification (1–10)
Rank	Rider	Team	Points
1	Arnaud Démare (FRA)	Groupama–FDJ	254
2	Fernando Gaviria (COL)	UAE Team Emirates	136
3	Mark Cavendish (GBR)	Quick-Step Alpha Vinyl Team	132
4	Mathieu van der Poel (NED)	Alpecin–Fenix	105
5	Alberto Dainese (ITA)	Team DSM	95
6	Dries De Bondt (BEL)	Alpecin–Fenix	83
7	Simone Consonni (ITA)	Cofidis	73
8	Phil Bauhaus (GER)	Team Bahrain Victorious	72
9	Koen Bouwman (NED)	Team Jumbo–Visma	71
10	Filippo Tagliani (ITA)	Drone Hopper–Androni Giocattoli	70

=== Mountains classification ===
Final mountains classification (1–10)
Rank	Rider	Team	Points
1	Koen Bouwman (NED)	Team Jumbo–Visma	294
2	Giulio Ciccone (ITA)	Trek–Segafredo	163
3	Alessandro Covi (ITA)	UAE Team Emirates	102
4	Diego Rosa (ITA)	Eolo–Kometa	94
5	Davide Formolo (ITA)	UAE Team Emirates	87
6	Jai Hindley (AUS)	Bora–Hansgrohe	78
7	Lennard Kämna (GER)	Bora–Hansgrohe	78
8	Santiago Buitrago (COL)	Team Bahrain Victorious	71
9	Richard Carapaz (ECU)	INEOS Grenadiers	65
10	Jan Hirt (CZE)	Intermarché–Wanty–Gobert Matériaux	57

=== Young rider classification ===
Final young rider classification (1–10)
Rank	Rider	Team	Time
1	Juan Pedro López (ESP)	Trek–Segafredo	86h 49' 54"
2	Santiago Buitrago (COL)	Team Bahrain Victorious	+ 5' 43"
3	Pavel Sivakov (FRA)	INEOS Grenadiers	+ 23' 03"
4	Thymen Arensman (NED)	Team DSM	+ 23' 51"
5	Luca Covili (ITA)	Bardiani–CSF–Faizanè	+ 1h 11' 44"
6	Gijs Leemreize (NED)	Team Jumbo–Visma	+ 1h 41' 00"
7	Vadim Pronskiy (KAZ)	Astana Qazaqstan Team	+ 1h 44' 30"
8	Mauri Vansevenant (BEL)	Quick-Step Alpha Vinyl Team	+ 1h 45' 04"
9	Attila Valter (HUN)	Groupama–FDJ	+ 1h 57' 13"
10	Ben Tulett (GBR)	INEOS Grenadiers	+ 2h 08' 46"

=== Team classification ===
Final team classification (1–10)
Rank	Team	Time
1	Team Bahrain Victorious	259h 48' 12"
2	(Germany) Bora–Hansgrohe	+ 4' 07"
3	(United Kingdom) INEOS Grenadiers	+ 1h 22' 29"
4	(Belgium) Intermarché–Wanty–Gobert Matériaux	+ 1h 23' 57"
5	(Kazakhstan) Astana Qazaqstan Team	+ 2h 18' 46"
6	(United States) Trek–Segafredo	+ 2h 21' 10"
7	(Netherlands) Team Jumbo–Visma	+ 2h 40' 16"
8	(United Arab Emirates) UAE Team Emirates	+ 3h 21' 02"
9	(Australia) Team BikeExchange–Jayco	+ 3h 29' 58"
10	(Spain) Movistar Team	+ 3h 39' 45"

=== Intermediate sprint classification ===
Final intermediate sprint classification (1–10)
Rank	Rider	Team	Points
1	Filippo Tagliani (ITA)	Drone Hopper–Androni Giocattoli	78
2	Mattia Bais (ITA)	Drone Hopper–Androni Giocattoli	45
3	Koen Bouwman (NED)	Team Jumbo–Visma	32
4	Stefano Oldani (ITA)	Alpecin–Fenix	29
5	Diego Rosa (ITA)	Eolo–Kometa	28
6	Dries De Bondt (BEL)	Alpecin–Fenix	25
7	Julius van den Berg (NED)	EF Education–EasyPost	22
8	Richard Carapaz (ECU)	INEOS Grenadiers	19
9	Giulio Ciccone (ITA)	Trek–Segafredo	19
10	Bauke Mollema (NED)	Trek–Segafredo	19

=== Breakaway classification ===
Final breakaway classification (1–10)
Rank	Rider	Team	Kilometres
1	Mattia Bais (ITA)	Drone Hopper–Androni Giocattoli	617
2	Filippo Tagliani (ITA)	Drone Hopper–Androni Giocattoli	581
3	Diego Rosa (ITA)	Eolo–Kometa	301
4	Koen Bouwman (NED)	Team Jumbo–Visma	293
5	Mirco Maestri (ITA)	Eolo–Kometa	247
6	Dries De Bondt (BEL)	Alpecin–Fenix	207
7	Davide Gabburo (ITA)	Bardiani–CSF–Faizanè	192
8	Alessandro Tonelli (ITA)	Bardiani–CSF–Faizanè	188
9	Pascal Eenkhoorn (NED)	Team Jumbo–Visma	182
10	Samuele Rivi (ITA)	Eolo–Kometa	172

=== Fair play classification ===
Final fair play classification (1–10)
Rank	Team	Points
1	Team Bahrain Victorious	0
2	(France) Cofidis	0
3	(Netherlands) Team DSM	0
4	(United States) Trek–Segafredo	20
5	(Germany) Bora–Hansgrohe	30
6	(Belgium) Quick-Step Alpha Vinyl Team	30
7	(Belgium) Intermarché–Wanty–Gobert Matériaux	50
8	(Italy) Eolo–Kometa	50
9	(Italy) Bardiani–CSF–Faizanè	60
10	(Kazakhstan) Astana Qazaqstan Team	70
