= Gijs Leemreize =

Dutch cyclist (born 1999)

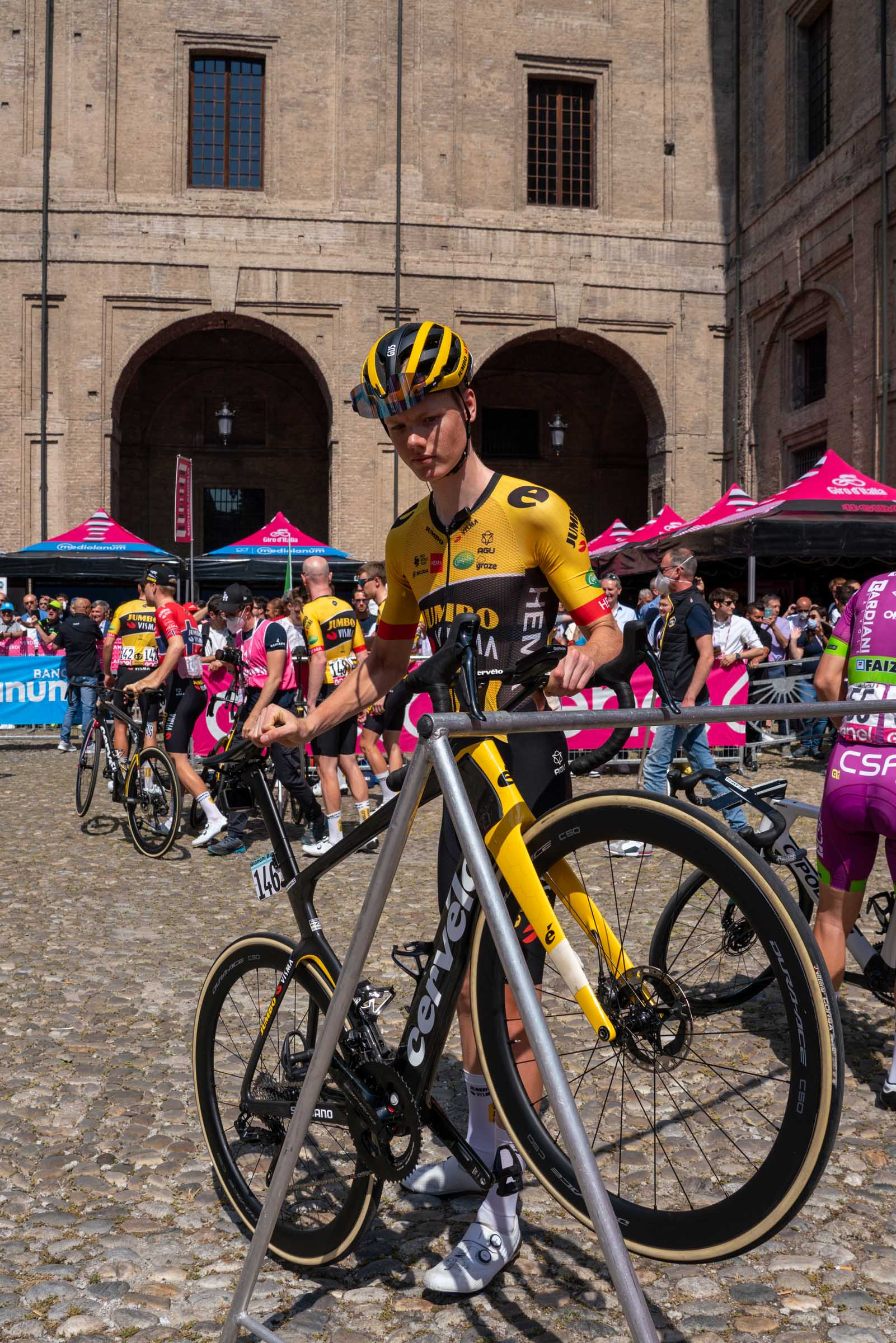

Personal information
- Full name: Gijs Leemreize
- Nickname: Young Gizza
- Born: 23 October 1999 (age 27) Ruurlo, Netherlands
- Height: 1.9 m (6 ft 3 in)
- Weight: 74 kg (163 lb)

Cycling career
- Sport: Cycling
- Current team: Team Picnic–PostNL
- Discipline: Road
- Role: Rider
- Rider type: Climber

Amateur team
- 2019: Sensa–Kanjers voor Kanjers

Professional teams
- 2020: Jumbo–Visma Development Team
- 2020: Team Jumbo–Visma (development) (Note: Leemreize competed at the 2020 Tour de la Provence and the 2020 Vuelta a Burgos with Team Jumbo–Visma, following the introduction of a UCI rule allowing riders registered with a development team to participate in UCI ProSeries or Class 1 events.)
- 2021–2023: Team Jumbo–Visma
- 2024–: Team dsm–firmenich PostNL

Gijs Leemreize (born 23 October 1999) is a Dutch professional racing cyclist who currently rides for UCI WorldTeam Team Picnic–PostNL.

== Career ==
Leemreize joined the Jumbo–Visma Development Team for their inaugural season in 2020. Leemreize rode with UCI WorldTeam Team Jumbo–Visma as a development opportunity – following the introduction of a UCI rule permitting these – at the Tour de la Provence, in February. Following the announcement that he was joining the team full-time in 2021, Leemreize made a second appearance with the team at the Vuelta a Burgos. He was involved in a heavy crash on the first stage of the race; as a result of the crash, he severed a finger on his right hand and had to abandon the race. He was taken to hospital and underwent surgery on the hand later that day.

== Major results ==
2019
1st Mountains classification Carpathian Couriers Race
2020
5th Overall Ronde de l'Isard
2021
1st Overall Ronde de l'Isard

1st Points classification
1st Stage 5

4th Overall Tour de l'Avenir

1st Stage 2 (TTT)

2022
5th Overall Sibiu Cycling Tour
2023
1st Stage 2 (TTT) Vuelta a Burgos

=== Grand Tour general classification results timeline ===
Grand Tour	2022	2023	2024	2025
Giro d'Italia	28	—	43	43
Tour de France	—	—	—	
Vuelta a España	—	—	84	

Legend
—	Did not compete
DNF	Did not finish
