= Luca Covili =

Italian cyclist (born 1997)

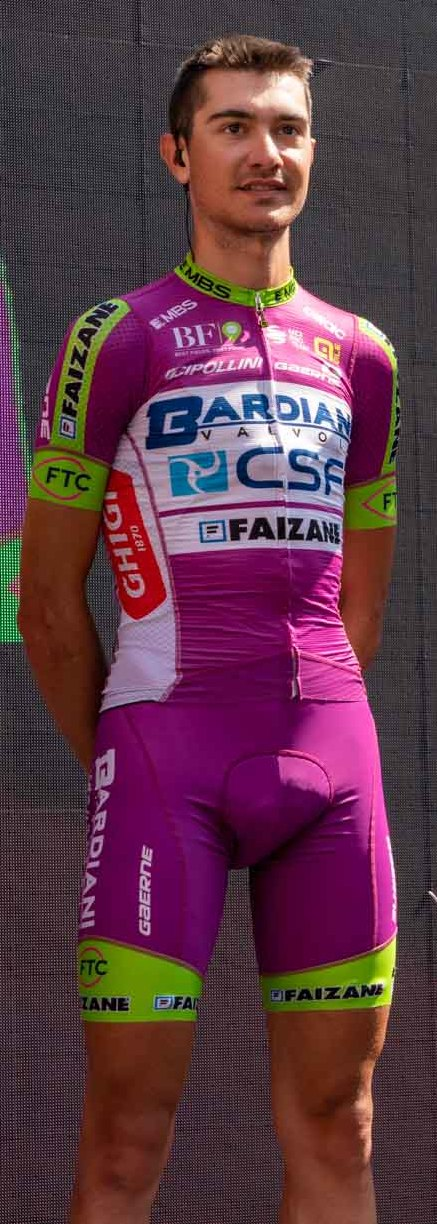

Personal information
- Born: 10 February 1997 (age 29) Pavullo nel Frignano, Italy

Cycling career
- Sport: Cycling
- Current team: Bardiani–CSF 7 Saber
- Discipline: Road
- Role: Rider

Amateur teams
- 2016–2017: Soligo Amarù Sirio Palazzago
- 2017: Amore & Vita–Selle SMP (stagiaire)
- 2018: Mastromarco Sensi FC Nibali

Professional team
- 2019–: Bardiani–CSF

Luca Covili (born 10 February 1997) is an Italian racing cyclist, who currently rides for UCI ProTeam Bardiani–CSF 7 Saber. In May 2019, he was named in the startlist for the 2019 Giro d'Italia.

== Major results ==
2017
6th Overall Giro della Valle d'Aosta
2018
8th Overall Toscana-Terra di Ciclismo
2021
7th Overall Adriatica Ionica Race
6th Overall Czech Cycling Tour
8th Grand Prix Alanya
8th Grand Prix Velo Alanya
2022
4th Overall Adriatica Ionica Race
9th Overall Czech Cycling Tour
2023
6th Overall Czech Tour
2025
7th Overall Tour de Langkawi
2026
9th Overall Tour of Slovenia

=== Grand Tour general classification results timeline ===
Grand Tour	2019	2020	2021	2022	2023	2024
Giro d'Italia	84	DNF	—	24	DNF	18
Tour de France	—	—	—	—	—	
Vuelta a España	—	—	—	—	—	

Legend
—	Did not compete
DNF	Did not finish
