= Filippo Tagliani =

Italian cyclist

- Tagliani at 2025 Tour of Romania

Personal information
- Born: 14 August 1995 (age 31) Gavardo, Italy
- Height: 1.8 m (5 ft 11 in)
- Weight: 70 kg (154 lb)

Cycling career
- Sport: Cycling
- Current team: GW Erco SportFitness
- Discipline: Road
- Role: Rider
- Rider type: Sprinter

Amateur teams
- 2009–2011: Organizzazione Soprazocco
- 2012–2013: Aspiratori Otelli–Cas. Zani
- 2014: Named Ferroli
- 2015–2018: Delio Gallina Colosio Eurofeed
- 2019: Casillo Maserati
- 2020: Zalf–Euromobil–Désirée–Fior

Professional team
- 2021–: Androni Giocattoli–Sidermec
Medal record
Representing Italy
Men's road bicycle racing
Mediterranean Games
Silver medal – second place	2018 Tarragona	Road race

Filippo Tagliani (born 14 August 1995) is an Italian cyclist who currently rides for UCI Continental team GW Erco SportFitness.

== Major results ==
2016
3rd Overall Gemenc Grand Prix
2017
1st Overall Gemenc Grand Prix

1st Points classification
1st Young rider classification
1st Prologue & Stage 1

Challenge du Prince

7th Trophée de la Maison Royale
9th Trophée de l'Anniversaire

3rd Trofeo Città di Brescia
2018
1st Coppa San Geo
1st Gran Premio San Giuseppe
2nd Road race, Mediterranean Games
6th Puchar Uzdrowisk Karpackich
2019
1st Trofeo Papà Cervi
1st Coppa Messapica
9th Circuito del Porto
2021
6th Overall Belgrade Banjaluka

=== Grand Tour general classification results timeline ===
Grand Tour	2021	2022
Giro d'Italia	123	143
Tour de France	—	—
Vuelta a España	—	—

Legend
—	Did not compete
DNF	Did not finish
