= 2020 Team Sunweb (men's team) season =

Team Sunweb
- 2020 season
- UCI code: SUN
- Status: UCI WorldTeam
- Manager: Iwan Spekenbrink
- Main sponsor(s): Sunweb
- Based: Germany
- Bicycles: Cervélo
- Groupset: Shimano

Season victories
- One-day races: 3
- Stage race overall: 1
- Stage race stages: 12
- Most wins: Jai Hindley (5)
- Jersey

The 2020 season for Team Sunweb began in January with the Tour Down Under.

== Team roster ==
As of 15 May 2020.

Rider	Date of birth
Thymen Arensman (GER)	4 December 1999 (aged 20)
Nikias Arndt (GER)	18 November 1991 (aged 28)
Tiesj Benoot (BEL)	11 March 1994 (aged 25)
Cees Bol (NED)	27 July 1995 (aged 24)
Alberto Dainese (ITA)	25 March 1998 (aged 21)
Nico Denz (GER)	15 February 1994 (aged 25)
Mark Donovan (GBR)	3 April 1999 (aged 20)
Nils Eekhoff (NED)	23 January 1998 (aged 21)
Felix Gall (AUT)	27 February 1998 (aged 21)
Chad Haga (USA)	26 August 1988 (aged 31)
Chris Hamilton (AUS)	18 May 1995 (aged 24)
Jai Hindley (AUS)	5 May 1996 (aged 23)
Marc Hirschi (SUI)	24 August 1998 (aged 21)
Max Kanter (GER)	22 October 1997 (aged 22)
Wilco Kelderman (NED)	25 March 1991 (aged 28)

Rider	Date of birth
Asbjørn Kragh Andersen (DEN)	9 April 1992 (aged 27)
Søren Kragh Andersen (DEN)	10 August 1994 (aged 25)
Michael Matthews (AUS)	26 September 1990 (aged 29)
Joris Nieuwenhuis (NED)	11 February 1996 (aged 23)
Sam Oomen (NED)	15 August 1995 (aged 24)
Casper Pedersen (DEN)	15 March 1996 (aged 23)
Robert Power (AUS)	11 May 1995 (aged 24)
Nicolas Roche (IRL)	3 July 1984 (aged 35)
Martin Salmon (GER)	29 October 1997 (aged 22)
Michael Storer (AUS)	28 February 1997 (aged 22)
Florian Stork (GER)	27 April 1997 (aged 22)
Jasha Sütterlin (GER)	4 November 1992 (aged 27)
Martijn Tusveld (NED)	9 September 1993 (aged 26)
Ilan Van Wilder (BEL)	14 May 2000 (aged 19)

Riders who joined the team for the 2020 season

Rider	2019 team
Thymen Arensman	neo-pro (SEG Racing Academy)
Tiesj Benoot	Lotto–Soudal
Alberto Dainese	neo-pro (SEG Racing Academy)
Mark Donovan	neo-pro (Team Wiggins Le Col)
Nico Denz	AG2R La Mondiale
Nils Eekhoff	neo-pro (Development Team Sunweb)
Felix Gall	neo-pro (Development Team Sunweb)
Martin Salmon	neo-pro (Development Team Sunweb)
Jasha Sutterlin	Movistar Team
Ilan Van Wilder	neo-pro

Riders who left the team during or after the 2019 season

Rider	2020 team
Jan Bakelants	Circus–Wanty Gobert
Roy Curvers	Retired
Tom Dumoulin	Team Jumbo–Visma
Johannes Fröhlinger	Retired
Lennard Kämna	Bora–Hansgrohe
Louis Vervaeke	Alpecin–Fenix
Max Walscheid	NTT Pro Cycling

== Season victories ==
Date	Race	Competition	Rider	Country	Location
5 February	Herald Sun Tour, Stage 1	UCI Oceania Tour	Alberto Dainese (ITA)	Australia	Shepparton
6 February	Herald Sun Tour, Stage 2	UCI Oceania Tour	Jai Hindley (AUS)	Australia	Falls Creek
8 February	Herald Sun Tour, Stage 4	UCI Oceania Tour	Jai Hindley (AUS)	Australia	Mount Buller
9 February	Herald Sun Tour, Overall	UCI Oceania Tour	Jai Hindley (AUS)	Australia	
9 February	Herald Sun Tour, Points classification	UCI Oceania Tour	Jai Hindley (AUS)	Australia	
9 February	Herald Sun Tour, Teams classification	UCI Oceania Tour	(Note: The riders in the squad were Alberto Dainese, Jai Hindley, Max Kanter, Asbjørn Kragh Andersen, Robert Power, Michael Storer, and Florian Stork.)	Australia	
21 February	Volta ao Algarve, Stage 3	UCI Europe Tour; UCI ProSeries	Cees Bol (NED)	Portugal	Tavira
11 March	Paris–Nice, Stage 4	UCI World Tour	Søren Kragh Andersen (DEN)	France	Saint-Amand-Montrond
13 March	Paris–Nice, Stage 6	UCI World Tour	Tiesj Benoot (BEL)	France	Apt
14 March	Paris–Nice, Points classification	UCI World Tour	Tiesj Benoot (BEL)	France	
14 March	Paris–Nice, Teams classification	UCI World Tour	(Note: The riders in the squad were Nikias Arndt, Tiesj Benoot, Cees Bol, Nico Denz, Nils Eekhoff, Chris Hamilton, Søren Kragh Andersen, and Michael Matthews.)	France	
25 August	Bretagne Classic Ouest–France	UCI World Tour	Michael Matthews (AUS)	France	Plouay
10 September	Tour de France, Stage 12	UCI World Tour	Marc Hirschi (SUI)	France	Sarran
12 September	Tour de France, Stage 14	UCI World Tour	Søren Kragh Andersen (DEN)	France	Lyon
14 September	Tirreno–Adriatico, Teams classification	UCI World Tour	(Note: The riders in the squad were Alberto Dainese, Chris Hamilton, Jai Hindley, Wilco Kelderman, Michael Matthews, Sam Oomen, and Martijn Tusveld.)	Italy	
17 September	Okolo Slovenska, Stage 2	UCI Europe Tour	Nico Denz (GER)	Slovakia	Banská Bystrica
18 September	Tour de France, Stage 19	UCI World Tour	Søren Kragh Andersen (DEN)	France	Champagnole
20 September	Tour de France, Super-combativity award	UCI World Tour	Marc Hirschi (SUI)	France	
30 September	La Flèche Wallonne	UCI World Tour	Marc Hirschi (SUI)	Belgium	Mur de Huy
2 October	BinckBank Tour, Stage 4	UCI World Tour	Søren Kragh Andersen (DEN)	Belgium	Riemst
11 October	Paris–Tours	UCI Europe Tour; UCI ProSeries	Casper Pedersen (DEN)	France	Tours
22 October	Giro d'Italia, Stage 18	UCI World Tour	Jai Hindley (AUS)	Italy	Laghi di Cancano

== National, Continental and World champions 2020 ==
Date	Discipline	Jersey	Rider	Country	Location
