= 2020 Mitchelton–Scott (men's team) season =

Mitchelton–Scott
- 2020 season
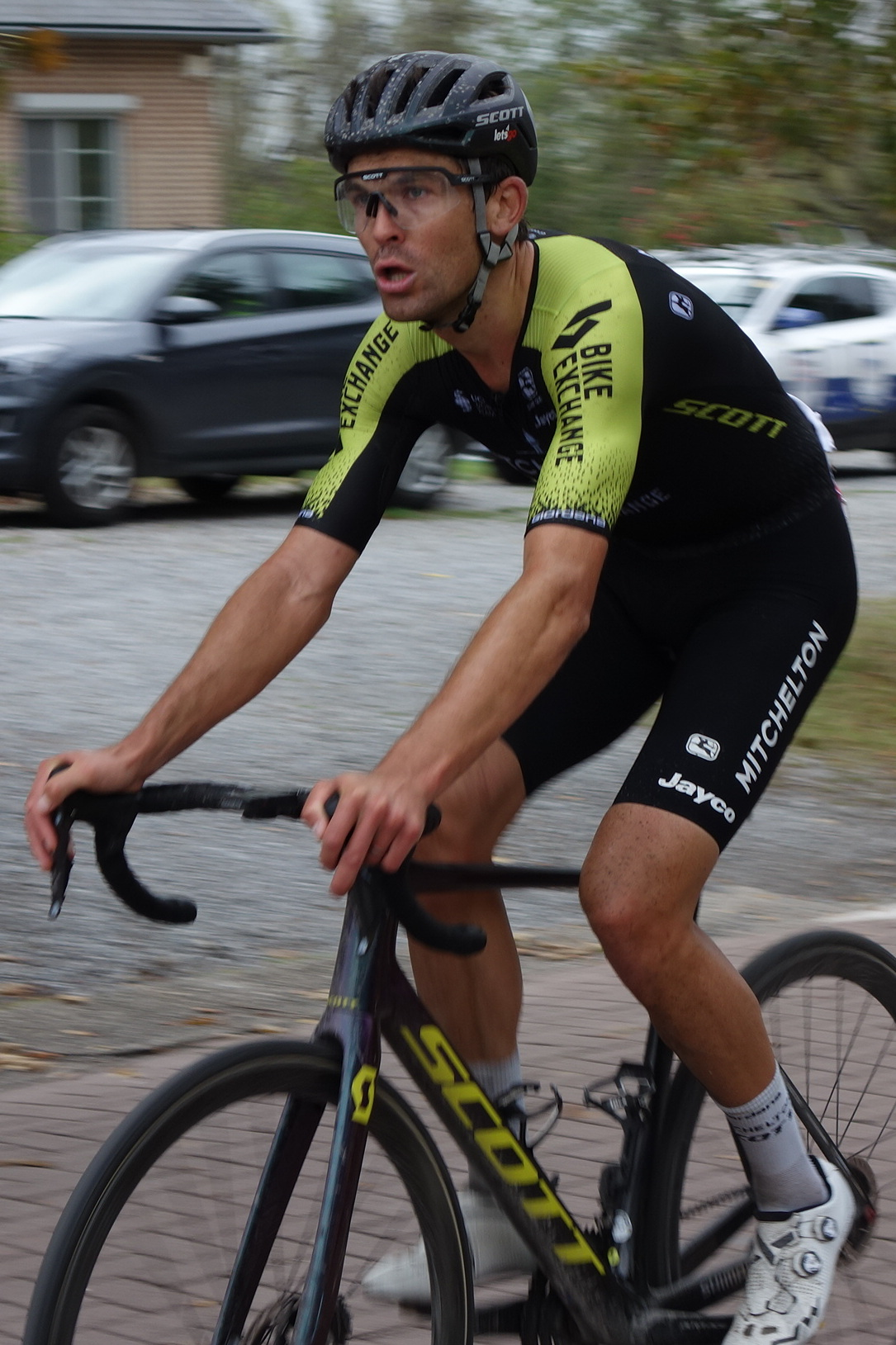
- Jack Bauer on La Flèche Wallonne
- UCI code: MTS
- Status: UCI WorldTeam
- Manager: Shayne Bannan
- Main sponsor(s): Mitchelton Wines, Scott
- Based: Australia
- Bicycles: Scott
- Groupset: Shimano

Season victories
- One-day races: 1
- Stage race overall: 3
- Stage race stages: 8
- National Championships: 4
- Most wins: Kaden Groves, Damien Howson, Adam Yates, Simon Yates (2 each)
- Jersey

The 2020 season for the Mitchelton–Scott cycling team began in January at the Tour Down Under.

== Team roster ==
As of 15 May 2020.

Rider	Date of birth
Edoardo Affini (ITA)	24 June 1996 (aged 23)
Michael Albasini (Note: Albasini will retire from the sport on June 14.) (SUI)	20 December 1980 (aged 39)
Jack Bauer (NZL)	7 April 1985 (aged 34)
Sam Bewley (NZL)	22 July 1987 (aged 32)
Brent Bookwalter (USA)	16 February 1984 (aged 35)
Esteban Chaves (COL)	17 January 1990 (aged 29)
Luke Durbridge (AUS)	9 April 1991 (aged 28)
Alex Edmondson (AUS)	22 December 1993 (aged 26)
Tsgabu Grmay (ETH)	25 August 1991 (aged 28)
Kaden Groves (AUS)	23 December 1998 (aged 21)
Jack Haig (AUS)	6 September 1993 (aged 26)
Lucas Hamilton (AUS)	12 February 1996 (aged 23)
Michael Hepburn (AUS)	17 August 1991 (aged 28)
Damien Howson (AUS)	13 August 1992 (aged 27)

Rider	Date of birth
Daryl Impey (RSA)	6 December 1984 (aged 35)
Christopher Juul-Jensen (DEN)	6 July 1989 (aged 30)
Alexander Konychev (ITA)	25 July 1998 (aged 21)
Cameron Meyer (AUS)	11 January 1988 (aged 31)
Luka Mezgec (SLO)	27 June 1988 (aged 31)
Mikel Nieve (ESP)	26 May 1984 (aged 35)
Barnabás Peák (HUN)	29 November 1998 (aged 21)
Nick Schultz (AUS)	13 September 1994 (aged 25)
Callum Scotson (AUS)	10 August 1996 (aged 23)
Dion Smith (NZL)	3 March 1993 (aged 26)
Robert Stannard (AUS)	16 September 1998 (aged 21)
Adam Yates (GBR)	7 August 1992 (aged 27)
Simon Yates (GBR)	7 August 1992 (aged 27)
Andrey Zeits (KAZ)	14 December 1986 (aged 33)

Riders who joined the team for the 2020 season

Rider	2019 team
Kaden Groves	neo-pro (SEG Racing Academy)
Alexander Konychev	neo-pro (Dimension Data for Qhubeka)
Barnabás Peák	neo-pro (SEG Racing Academy)
Andrey Zeits	Astana

Riders who left the team during or after the 2019 season

Rider	2020 team
Mathew Hayman	Retired
Matteo Trentin	CCC Team

== Season victories ==
Date	Race	Competition	Rider	Country	Location
7 February	Herald Sun Tour, Stage 3	UCI Oceania Tour	Kaden Groves (AUS)	Australia	Wangaratta
9 February	Herald Sun Tour, Stage 5	UCI Oceania Tour	Kaden Groves (AUS)	Australia	Melbourne
22 February	Vuelta a Andalucía, Stage 4	UCI Europe Tour; UCI ProSeries	Jack Haig (AUS)	Spain	Granada
25 February	UAE Tour, Stage 3	UCI World Tour	Adam Yates (GBR)	United Arab Emirates	Jebel Hafeet
27 February	UAE Tour, Overall	UCI World Tour	Adam Yates (GBR)	United Arab Emirates	
1 August	Vuelta a Burgos, Teams classification	UCI Europe Tour; UCI ProSeries	(Note: The riders in the squad were Esteban Chaves, Alex Edmondson, Jack Haig, Lucas Hamilton, Christopher Juul-Jensen, Mikel Nieve and Simon Yates.)	Spain	
6 August	Czech Cycling Tour, Stage 1 (TTT)	UCI Europe Tour	(Note: The winning riders were Edoardo Affini, Jack Bauer, Luke Durbridge, Kaden Groves, Lucas Hamilton, Michael Hepburn, and Damien Howson.)	Czech Republic	Uničov
9 August	Czech Cycling Tour, Stage 4	UCI Europe Tour	Damien Howson (AUS)	Czech Republic	Šternberk
9 August	Czech Cycling Tour, Overall	UCI Europe Tour	Damien Howson (AUS)	Czech Republic	
9 August	Tour de Pologne, Sprints classification	UCI World Tour	Luka Mezgec (SLO)	Poland	
9 August	Tour de Pologne, Teams classification	UCI World Tour	(Note: The riders in the squad were Sam Bewley, Esteban Chaves, Daryl Impey, Luka Mezgec, Mikel Nieve, Barnabás Peák, and Simon Yates.)	Poland	
10 September	Tirreno–Adriatico, Stage 4	UCI World Tour	Lucas Hamilton (AUS)	Italy	Cascia
11 September	Tirreno–Adriatico, Stage 5	UCI World Tour	Simon Yates (GBR)	Italy	Sassotetto
14 September	Tirreno–Adriatico, Overall	UCI World Tour	Simon Yates (GBR)	Italy	
17 September	Coppa Sabatini	UCI Europe Tour; UCI ProSeries	Dion Smith (NZL)	Italy	Peccioli

== National, Continental and World champions ==
Date	Discipline	Jersey	Rider	Country	Location
8 January	Australian National Time Trial Championships		Luke Durbridge (AUS)	Australia	Buninyong
12 January	Australian National Road Race Championships		Cameron Meyer (AUS)	Australia	Buninyong
7 February	South African National Time Trial Championships		Daryl Impey (RSA)	South Africa	Swadini Resort
21 August	Hungarian National Time Trial Championships		Barnabás Peák (HUN)	Hungary	Debrecen
