= 2020 Herald Sun Tour =

Cycling race

2020 Jayco Herald Sun Tour
2020 UCI Oceania Tour

Race details
- Dates: 5–9 February 2020
- Stages: 5
- Distance: 612.1 km (380.3 mi)
- Winning time: 14h 50' 23"

Results
Jersey awarded to the overall winner	Winner	Jai Hindley (AUS)	(Team Sunweb)
	Second	Sebastian Berwick (AUS)	(St George Continental Cycling Team)
	Third	Damien Howson (AUS)	(Mitchelton–Scott)
Jersey awarded to the mountains classification winner	Mountains	Jai Hindley (AUS)	(Team Sunweb)
Jersey awarded to the young rider classification winner	Young rider	Sebastian Berwick (AUS)	(St George Continental Cycling Team)
Jersey awarded to the sprints classification winner	Sprints	Benjamin Hill (AUS)	(Team BridgeLane)
	Team	Team Sunweb	

The 2020 Jayco Herald Sun Tour was a road cycling stage race that took place between 5 and 9 February 2020 in Victoria, Australia. It was the 67th edition of the Herald Sun Tour and was a part of the 2020 UCI Oceania Tour.

== Teams ==
Four UCI WorldTeams and nine UCI Continental teams were invited to the race. Along with an Australian national team, there were fourteen teams in the race. Each team entered seven riders with the except of Team Sapura Cycling, which entered only four. Of the 95 riders that started the race, 80 riders finished.

UCI WorldTeams

- EF Pro Cycling
- Israel Start-Up Nation
- Mitchelton–Scott
- Team Sunweb

UCI Continental Teams

- Aevolo
- ARA Pro Racing Sunshine Coast
- Black Spoke Pro Cycling Academy
- Kinan Cycling Team
- Nero Continental
- Oliver's Real Food Racing
- St George Continental Cycling Team
- Team BridgeLane
- Team Sapura Cycling

National Teams

- KordaMentha Real Estate Australia

== Route ==
Stage characteristics and winners
Stage	Date	Route	Distance	Type	Winner
1	5 February	Nagambie to Shepparton	121.9 km (75.7 mi)	Flat stage	Alberto Dainese (ITA)
2	6 February	Beechworth to Falls Creek	117.6 km (73.1 mi)	Mountain stage	Jai Hindley (AUS)
3	7 February	Bright to Wangaratta	178.1 km (110.7 mi)	Hilly stage	Kaden Groves (AUS)
4	8 February	Mansfield to Mount Buller	106.6 km (66.2 mi)	Mountain stage	Jai Hindley (AUS)
5	9 February	Melbourne	89.1 km (55.4 mi)	Flat stage	Kaden Groves (AUS)
Total		612.1 km (380.3 mi)			

== Stages ==
=== Stage 1 ===
5 February 2020 — Nagambie to Shepparton, 121.9 km (75.7 mi)

Stage 1 Result
Rank	Rider	Team	Time
1	Alberto Dainese (ITA)	Team Sunweb	2h 36' 42"
2	Kaden Groves (AUS)	Mitchelton–Scott	+ 0"
3	Moreno Hofland (NED)	EF Pro Cycling	+ 0"
4	Mihkel Räim (EST)	Israel Start-Up Nation	+ 0"
5	Godfrey Slattery (AUS)	KordaMentha Real Estate Australia	+ 0"
6	Michael Rice (AUS)	ARA Pro Racing Sunshine Coast	+ 0"
7	Roy Eefting (NED)	Team Sapura Cycling	+ 0"
8	Yasuharu Nakajima (JPN)	Kinan Cycling Team	+ 0"
9	Tom Scully (NZL)	EF Pro Cycling	+ 0"
10	Thomas Bolton (AUS)	Oliver's Real Food Racing	+ 0"

General classification after Stage 1
Rank	Rider	Team	Time
1	Alberto Dainese (ITA)	Team Sunweb	2h 36' 32"
2	Kaden Groves (AUS)	Mitchelton–Scott	+ 4"
3	Moreno Hofland (NED)	EF Pro Cycling	+ 6"
4	Roy Eefting (NED)	Team Sapura Cycling	+ 7"
5	Benjamin Hill (AUS)	Team BridgeLane	+ 7"
6	Craig Wiggins (AUS)	St George Continental Cycling Team	+ 9"
7	Charles-Étienne Chrétien (CAN)	Aevolo	+ 9"
8	Mihkel Räim (EST)	Israel Start-Up Nation	+ 10"
9	Godfrey Slattery (AUS)	KordaMentha Real Estate Australia	+ 10"
10	Michael Rice (AUS)	ARA Pro Racing Sunshine Coast	+ 10"

=== Stage 2 ===
6 February 2020 — Beechworth to Falls Creek, 117.6 km (73.1 mi)

Stage 2 Result
Rank	Rider	Team	Time
1	Jai Hindley (AUS)	Team Sunweb	3h 06' 29"
2	Damien Howson (AUS)	Mitchelton–Scott	+ 0"
3	Sebastian Berwick (AUS)	St George Continental Cycling Team	+ 0"
4	Neilson Powless (USA)	EF Pro Cycling	+ 13"
5	Michael Storer (AUS)	Team Sunweb	+ 37"
6	Jesse Ewart (AUS)	Team Sapura Cycling	+ 49"
7	James Whelan (AUS)	EF Pro Cycling	+ 1' 01"
8	Jay Vine (AUS)	Nero Continental	+ 1' 01"
9	Thomas Lebas (FRA)	Kinan Cycling Team	+ 1' 05"
10	Robert Power (AUS)	Team Sunweb	+ 1' 09"

General classification after Stage 2
Rank	Rider	Team	Time
1	Jai Hindley (AUS)	Team Sunweb	5h 43' 01"
2	Damien Howson (AUS)	Mitchelton–Scott	+ 4"
3	Sebastian Berwick (AUS)	St George Continental Cycling Team	+ 6"
4	Neilson Powless (USA)	EF Pro Cycling	+ 23"
5	Michael Storer (AUS)	Team Sunweb	+ 47"
6	Jesse Ewart (AUS)	Team Sapura Cycling	+ 59"
7	James Whelan (AUS)	EF Pro Cycling	+ 1' 11"
8	Jay Vine (AUS)	Nero Continental	+ 1' 11"
9	Thomas Lebas (FRA)	Kinan Cycling Team	+ 1' 15"
10	Robert Power (AUS)	Team Sunweb	+ 1' 19"

=== Stage 3 ===
7 February 2020 — Bright to Wangaratta, 178.1 km (110.7 mi)

Stage 3 Result
Rank	Rider	Team	Time
1	Kaden Groves (AUS)	Mitchelton–Scott	4h 07' 27"
2	Alberto Dainese (ITA)	Team Sunweb	+ 0"
3	Mihkel Räim (EST)	Israel Start-Up Nation	+ 0"
4	Moreno Hofland (NED)	EF Pro Cycling	+ 0"
5	Michael Rice (AUS)	ARA Pro Racing Sunshine Coast	+ 0"
6	Michael Freiberg (AUS)	ARA Pro Racing Sunshine Coast	+ 2"
7	Hayden McCormick (NZL)	Black Spoke Pro Cycling Academy	+ 2"
8	Omer Goldstein (ISR)	Israel Start-Up Nation	+ 2"
9	Godfrey Slattery (AUS)	KordaMentha Real Estate Australia	+ 2"
10	Samuel Jenner (AUS)	Team BridgeLane	+ 2"

General classification after Stage 3
Rank	Rider	Team	Time
1	Jai Hindley (AUS)	Team Sunweb	9h 50' 30"
2	Damien Howson (AUS)	Mitchelton–Scott	+ 4"
3	Sebastian Berwick (AUS)	St George Continental Cycling Team	+ 6"
4	Neilson Powless (USA)	EF Pro Cycling	+ 23"
5	Michael Storer (AUS)	Team Sunweb	+ 47"
6	Jesse Ewart (AUS)	Team Sapura Cycling	+ 59"
7	James Whelan (AUS)	EF Pro Cycling	+ 1' 08"
8	Jay Vine (AUS)	Nero Continental	+ 1' 11"
9	Thomas Lebas (FRA)	Kinan Cycling Team	+ 1' 15"
10	Rudy Porter (AUS)	KordaMentha Real Estate Australia	+ 1' 39"

=== Stage 4 ===
8 February 2020 — Mansfield to Mount Buller, 106.6 km (66.2 mi)

Stage 4 Result
Rank	Rider	Team	Time
1	Jai Hindley (AUS)	Team Sunweb	3h 01' 25"
2	Sebastian Berwick (AUS)	St George Continental Cycling Team	+ 0"
3	Jay Vine (AUS)	Nero Continental	+ 9"
4	Jesse Ewart (AUS)	Team Sapura Cycling	+ 17"
5	Neilson Powless (USA)	EF Pro Cycling	+ 18"
6	Nick Schultz (AUS)	Mitchelton–Scott	+ 22"
7	Damien Howson (AUS)	Mitchelton–Scott	+ 22"
8	James Piccoli (CAN)	Israel Start-Up Nation	+ 23"
9	Marcos García (ESP)	Kinan Cycling Team	+ 23"
10	Thomas Lebas (FRA)	Kinan Cycling Team	+ 30"

General classification after Stage 4
Rank	Rider	Team	Time
1	Jai Hindley (AUS)	Team Sunweb	12h 51' 45"
2	Sebastian Berwick (AUS)	St George Continental Cycling Team	+ 10"
3	Damien Howson (AUS)	Mitchelton–Scott	+ 36"
4	Neilson Powless (USA)	EF Pro Cycling	+ 51"
5	Jesse Ewart (AUS)	Team Sapura Cycling	+ 1' 26"
6	Jay Vine (AUS)	Nero Continental	+ 1' 26"
7	Michael Storer (AUS)	Team Sunweb	+ 1' 50"
8	Thomas Lebas (FRA)	Kinan Cycling Team	+ 1' 55"
9	Rudy Porter (AUS)	KordaMentha Real Estate Australia	+ 2' 32"
10	James Oram (NZL)	Black Spoke Pro Cycling Academy	+ 2' 50"

=== Stage 5 ===
9 February 2020 — Melbourne, 89.1 km (55.4 mi)

Stage 5 Result
Rank	Rider	Team	Time
1	Kaden Groves (AUS)	Mitchelton–Scott	1h 58' 38"
2	Dion Smith (NZL)	Mitchelton–Scott	+ 0"
3	Moreno Hofland (NED)	EF Pro Cycling	+ 0"
4	Michael Rice (AUS)	ARA Pro Racing Sunshine Coast	+ 0"
5	Mihkel Räim (EST)	Israel Start-Up Nation	+ 0"
6	Asbjørn Kragh Andersen (DEN)	Team Sunweb	+ 0"
7	Scott McGill (USA)	Aevolo	+ 0"
8	Luke Mudgway (NZL)	Black Spoke Pro Cycling Academy	+ 0"
9	Guillaume Boivin (CAN)	Israel Start-Up Nation	+ 0"
10	Tyler Stites (USA)	Aevolo	+ 0"

General classification after Stage 5
Rank	Rider	Team	Time
1	Jai Hindley (AUS)	Team Sunweb	14h 50' 23"
2	Sebastian Berwick (AUS)	St George Continental Cycling Team	+ 17"
3	Damien Howson (AUS)	Mitchelton–Scott	+ 36"
4	Neilson Powless (USA)	EF Pro Cycling	+ 1' 00"
5	Jay Vine (AUS)	Nero Continental	+ 1' 28"
6	Jesse Ewart (AUS)	Team Sapura Cycling	+ 1' 32"
7	Michael Storer (AUS)	Team Sunweb	+ 1' 59"
8	Thomas Lebas (FRA)	Kinan Cycling Team	+ 2' 02"
9	Rudy Porter (AUS)	KordaMentha Real Estate Australia	+ 2' 41"
10	James Oram (NZL)	Black Spoke Pro Cycling Academy	+ 2' 50"

== Classification leadership table ==
Classification leadership by stage
Stage	Winner	General classification	Mountains classification	Sprints classification	Young rider classification	Most competitive rider(s)	Team classification
1	Alberto Dainese	Alberto Dainese	not awarded	Alberto Dainese	Alberto Dainese	Benjamin Hill	EF Pro Cycling
2	Jai Hindley	Jai Hindley	Jai Hindley	Benjamin Hill	Sebastian Berwick	not awarded	Team Sunweb
3	Kaden Groves	Jai Hindley	Jai Hindley	Alberto Dainese	Sebastian Berwick	James Whelan	Team Sunweb
4	Jai Hindley	Jai Hindley	Jai Hindley	Benjamin Hill	Sebastian Berwick	not awarded	Team Sunweb
5	Kaden Groves	Jai Hindley	Jai Hindley	Benjamin Hill	Sebastian Berwick	Michael Freiberg	Team Sunweb
Final		Jai Hindley	Jai Hindley	Benjamin Hill	Sebastian Berwick	not awarded	Team Sunweb

== Classification standings ==
Legend
Denotes the leader of the general classification	Denotes the leader of the mountains classification
Denotes the leader of the sprints classification	Denotes the leader of the young rider classification

=== General classification ===
Final general classification (1–10)
Rank	Rider	Team	Time
1	Jai Hindley (AUS)	Team Sunweb	14h 50' 23"
2	Sebastian Berwick (AUS)	St George Continental Cycling Team	+ 17"
3	Damien Howson (AUS)	Mitchelton–Scott	+ 36"
4	Neilson Powless (USA)	EF Pro Cycling	+ 1' 00"
5	Jay Vine (AUS)	Nero Continental	+ 1' 28"
6	Jesse Ewart (AUS)	Team Sapura Cycling	+ 1' 32"
7	Michael Storer (AUS)	Team Sunweb	+ 1' 59"
8	Thomas Lebas (FRA)	Kinan Cycling Team	+ 2' 02"
9	Rudy Porter (AUS)	KordaMentha Real Estate Australia	+ 2' 41"
10	James Oram (NZL)	Black Spoke Pro Cycling Academy	+ 2' 50"

=== Sprints classification ===
Final sprints classification (1–10)
Rank	Rider	Team	Points
1	Benjamin Hill (AUS)	Team BridgeLane	34
2	Kaden Groves (AUS)	Mitchelton–Scott	28
3	Jai Hindley (AUS)	Team Sunweb	20
4	Alberto Dainese (ITA)	Team Sunweb	18
5	Jay Vine (AUS)	Nero Continental	16
6	Moreno Hofland (NED)	EF Pro Cycling	16
7	Sebastian Berwick (AUS)	St George Continental Cycling Team	14
8	Charles-Étienne Chrétien (CAN)	Aevolo	12
9	Jesse Ewart (AUS)	Team Sapura Cycling	10
10	Mihkel Räim (EST)	Israel Start-Up Nation	10

=== Mountains classification ===
Final mountains classification (1–10)
Rank	Rider	Team	Points
1	Jai Hindley (AUS)	Team Sunweb	54
2	James Whelan (AUS)	EF Pro Cycling	26
3	Sebastian Berwick (AUS)	St George Continental Cycling Team	24
4	James Oram (NZL)	Black Spoke Pro Cycling Academy	20
5	Samuel Hill (AUS)	Team BridgeLane	20
6	Damien Howson (AUS)	Mitchelton–Scott	16
7	Conor Murtagh (AUS)	Oliver's Real Food Racing	12
8	Hayden McCormick (NZL)	Black Spoke Pro Cycling Academy	12
9	Jay Vine (AUS)	Nero Continental	8
10	Ben Perry (CAN)	Israel Start-Up Nation	8

=== Young rider classification ===
Final young rider classification (1–10)
Rank	Rider	Team	Time
1	Sebastian Berwick (AUS)	St George Continental Cycling Team	14h 50' 40"
2	Rudy Porter (AUS)	KordaMentha Real Estate Australia	+ 2' 24"
3	Charles-Étienne Chrétien (CAN)	Aevolo	+ 3' 12"
4	Jonas Rutsch (GER)	EF Pro Cycling	+ 4' 52"
5	Conor Schunk (USA)	Aevolo	+ 9' 12"
6	Ari Scott (NZL)	Black Spoke Pro Cycling Academy	+ 9' 39"
7	Carter Turnbull (AUS)	KordaMentha Real Estate Australia	+ 14' 20"
8	Calan White (AUS)	KordaMentha Real Estate Australia	+ 15' 13"
9	Sebastian Presley (AUS)	Oliver's Real Food Racing	+ 21' 36"
10	Dylan McKenna (AUS)	Nero Continental	+ 25' 31"

=== Teams classification ===
Final teams classification (1–10)
Rank	Team	Time
1	Team Sunweb	44h 37' 09"
2	EF Pro Cycling	+ 5' 45"
3	Mitchelton–Scott	+ 8' 13"
4	Black Spoke Pro Cycling Academy	+ 9' 48"
5	KordaMentha Real Estate Australia	+ 12' 15"
6	Kinan Cycling Team	+ 15' 05"
7	Israel Start-Up Nation	+ 16' 17"
8	Team BridgeLane	+ 30' 01"
9	Aevolo	+ 33' 07"
10	Nero Continental	+ 47' 03"
