= 2020 Tour de Pologne =

77th Tour de Pologne road cycling race

2020 UCI World Tour, race 7 of 21
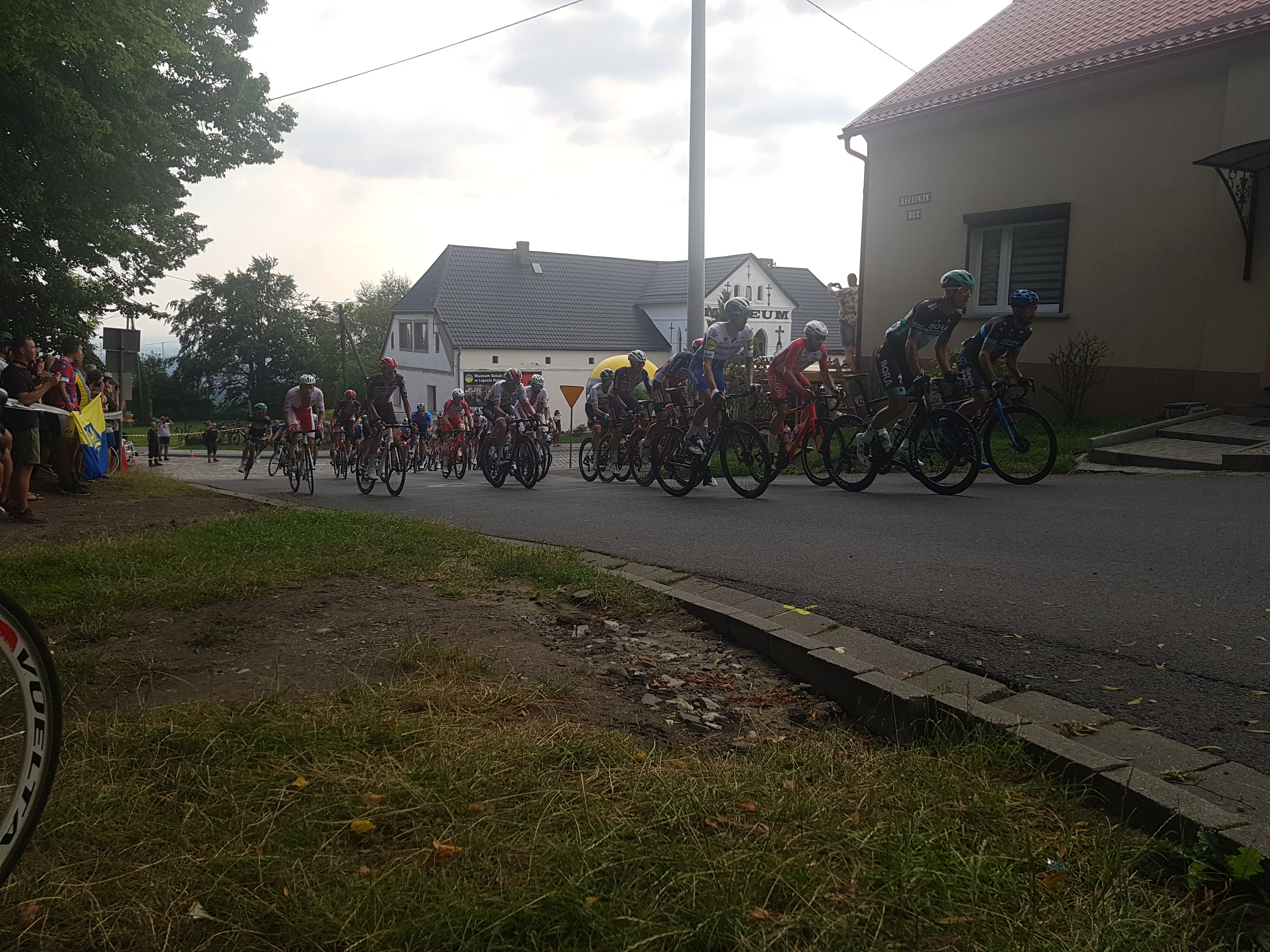

Race details
- Dates: 5 – 9 August 2020
- Stages: 5
- Distance: 911.4 km (566.3 mi)
- Winning time: 21h 29' 50"

Results
| Jersey awarded to the overall winner | Winner | Remco Evenepoel (BEL) | (Deceuninck–Quick-Step) |
| | Second | Jakob Fuglsang (DEN) | (Astana) |
| | Third | Simon Yates (GBR) | (Mitchelton–Scott) |
| Jersey awarded to the mountains classification winner | Mountains | Patryk Stosz (POL) | (Poland) |
| Jersey awarded to the sprints classification winner | Sprints | Luka Mezgec (SLO) | (Mitchelton–Scott) |
| Jersey awarded to the combativity classification winner | Combativity | Maciej Paterski (POL) | (Poland) |
| | Team | Mitchelton–Scott | |

The 2020 Tour de Pologne was the 77th running of the Tour de Pologne road cycling stage race. It started on 5 August in the Silesian Stadium, on the first anniversary of the death of Belgian rider Bjorg Lambrecht in the last edition of the race, and ended on 9 August in Kraków, after five stages. The tour was initially due to run from 5 to 11 July, but was postponed due to the COVID-19 pandemic. In memory of Lambrecht, the dossard number 143, which he wore in 2019, was retired from the race beginning this year.

After going solo on stage 4 and winning that stage by over a minute and a half, Belgian rider Remco Evenepoel of Deceuninck–Quick-Step held on to win the race comfortably over Danish rider Jakob Fuglsang of Astana and British rider Simon Yates of Mitchelton–Scott. Evenepoel dedicated his win to teammate Fabio Jakobsen, who had crashed on stage 1 and suffered several severe injuries. In winning the race at 20 years and 197 days old, Evenepoel became the third youngest winner, and second youngest distinct winner, of the Tour de Pologne after Dariusz Baranowski, who won the 1991 and 1992 editions of the race at 19 and 20 years of age, respectively.

== Teams ==
All nineteen UCI WorldTeams, two wildcard UCI ProTeams, and the Polish national team participated in the race. Each of the twenty-two teams entered seven riders, for a starting peloton of 154 riders. Of these riders, 138 finished the race.

UCI WorldTeams

- AG2R La Mondiale
- Astana
- Bahrain–McLaren
- Bora–Hansgrohe
- CCC Team
- Cofidis
- Deceuninck–Quick-Step
- EF Pro Cycling
- Groupama–FDJ
- Israel Start-Up Nation
- Lotto–Soudal
- Mitchelton–Scott
- Movistar Team
- NTT Pro Cycling
- Team Ineos
- Team Jumbo–Visma
- Team Sunweb
- Trek–Segafredo
- UAE Team Emirates

UCI ProTeams

- Gazprom–RusVelo
- Team Novo Nordisk

National Teams

- Poland

== Schedule ==
Stage characteristics and winners
| Stage | Date | Route | Distance | Type | Winner |
|---|---|---|---|---|---|
| 1 | 5 August | Stadion Śląski, Chorzów to Katowice | 195.8 km (121.7 mi) | Flat stage | Fabio Jakobsen (NED) (Note: Dylan Groenewegen was originally listed as the stage winner. Groenewegen was later disqualified by the race officials.) |
| 2 | 6 August | Opole to Zabrze | 151.5 km (94.1 mi) | Flat stage | Mads Pedersen (DEN) |
| 3 | 7 August | Wadowice to Bielsko-Biała | 203.1 km (126.2 mi) | Medium-mountain stage | Richard Carapaz (ECU) |
| 4 | 8 August | Terma Bukowina Tatrzańska to Bukowina Tatrzańska | 173 km (107 mi) | Mountain stage | Remco Evenepoel (BEL) |
| 5 | 9 August | Zakopane to Kraków | 188 km (117 mi) | Medium-mountain stage | Davide Ballerini (ITA) |
| Total | | 911.4 km (566.3 mi) | | | |

== Stages ==
=== Stage 1 ===
5 August 2020 – Stadion Śląski, Chorzów to Katowice, 195.8 km (121.7 mi)

The main breakaway of the day was made up of four riders, Polish riders Kamil Małecki of CCC Team and Maciej Paterski riding for the Polish national team, Dutch rider Julius van den Berg of EF Pro Cycling, and British rider Sam Brand of Team Novo Nordisk. The result for each of the three intermediate sprints was the same, with Paterski winning all of them, followed by Małecki in second and van den Berg in third; this meant that Paterski would be the first wearer of the blue jersey as the leader of the active rider classification. Later in the race, Małecki won the first KOM point in the first lap of the finishing circuit, and van den Berg would take the second KOM point before the breakaway was brought back with around 20 kilometers to go.

The stage was marred by several crashes late in the race, with Colombian rider Juan Sebastián Molano of UAE Team Emirates and German rider John Degenkolb of Lotto–Soudal among those to fall. The most notable of these crashes was a high-speed crash on the downhill sprint finish. As Dutch riders Dylan Groenewegen of Team Jumbo–Visma and Fabio Jakobsen of Deceuninck–Quick-Step were contesting the sprint, Groenewegen diverted from his line and veered to his right, colliding into Jakobsen, who was coming up alongside him. This caused Jakobsen to crash into and through the barriers, somersaulting and colliding with a race official sitting near the finish line. This crash caused a chain reaction and, with the barriers also coming loose, resulted in several more riders crashing behind the Dutch duo, including French rider Marc Sarreau of Groupama–FDJ, Spanish rider Eduard Prades of Movistar Team, and Belgian rider Jasper Philipsen of UAE Team Emirates. Groenewegen himself crashed as well, just after he crossed the finishing line when a flying section of barrier caught his back wheel. After the stage, the race jury decided to disqualify Groenewegen for his actions, thus expelling him from the race and expunging him of the win, which went to Jakobsen. Furthermore, the UCI fined Groenewegen 500 Swiss francs for violating UCI rules. In November 2020, Groenewegen was handed a nine-month ban for causing the crash, backdated to the day of the incident.

Jakobsen and the race official were taken to the hospital in critical condition, as were Sarreau, Prades, and French rider Damien Touzé of Cofidis, although the latter three suffered comparatively less severe injuries and only required further exams. The race official was reported to only have suffered a head injury and was in stable condition. The race doctor reported that Jakobsen had suffered several major injuries, including serious brain trauma and damage to the upper respiratory tract, a broken palate, and heavy blood loss, and remained in life-threatening condition. Later in the day, Jakobsen's condition was described as stable, but he remained in a medically induced coma awaiting further surgeries.

Stage 1 Result
| Rank | Rider | Team | Time |
|---|---|---|---|
| 1 | Fabio Jakobsen (NED) | Deceuninck–Quick-Step | 4h 31' 50" |
| 2 | Marc Sarreau (FRA) | Groupama–FDJ | + 0" |
| 3 | Luka Mezgec (SLO) | Mitchelton–Scott | + 0" |
| 4 | Jasper Philipsen (BEL) | UAE Team Emirates | + 0" |
| 5 | Ryan Gibbons (RSA) | NTT Pro Cycling | + 0" |
| 6 | Szymon Sajnok (POL) | CCC Team | + 0" |
| 7 | Damien Touzé (FRA) | Cofidis | + 0" |
| 8 | Roger Kluge (GER) | Lotto–Soudal | + 0" |
| 9 | Moreno Hofland (NED) | EF Pro Cycling | + 0" |
| 10 | Edward Theuns (BEL) | Trek–Segafredo | + 0" |

General classification after Stage 1
| Rank | Rider | Team | Time |
|---|---|---|---|
| 1 | Fabio Jakobsen (NED) | Deceuninck–Quick-Step | 4h 31' 44" |
| 2 | Marc Sarreau (FRA) | Groupama–FDJ | + 4" |
| 3 | Kamil Małecki (POL) | CCC Team | + 4" |
| 4 | Luka Mezgec (SLO) | Mitchelton–Scott | + 6" |
| 5 | Jasper Philipsen (BEL) | UAE Team Emirates | + 10" |
| 6 | Ryan Gibbons (RSA) | NTT Pro Cycling | + 10" |
| 7 | Szymon Sajnok (POL) | CCC Team | + 10" |
| 8 | Damien Touzé (FRA) | Cofidis | + 10" |
| 9 | Roger Kluge (GER) | Lotto–Soudal | + 10" |
| 10 | Moreno Hofland (NED) | EF Pro Cycling | + 10" |

=== Stage 2 ===
6 August 2020 – Opole to Zabrze, 151.5 km (94.1 mi)

Overnight, Jakobsen underwent intensive facial surgery, and doctors brought him out of the coma later in the day, reporting that he was "awake and in good condition." They elaborated, saying that "the extent of his injuries are such that his recovery process is expected to be 'long and arduous,'" but he was able to move his arms and legs and communicate with doctors. None of Jakobsen's vital organs were hit and major neurological problems were ruled out.

As a result of the injuries sustained in the previous day's crashes, Jakobsen, Prades, Sarreau, and Touzé did not start stage 2. Due to Jakobsen's and Sarreau's abandonments, Kamil Małecki, the best placed rider to start the stage, wore the yellow jersey.

The day's breakway was made up of two riders from the previous day's breakaway: Maciej Paterski and Julius van den Berg, who were the leaders of the active rider and mountains classifications, respectively. To add to their respective leads, Paterski won both intermediate sprints, while van den Berg won the KOM points on the only categorized climb of the day. With around 16 kilometers to go, the duo were caught by the peloton. A late attack from Patryk Stosz of the Polish national team with under 10 kilometers didn't last long, and he was swiftly brought back as several teams, notably Trek–Segafredo and Bora–Hansgrohe, began to set up for their sprinters.

Current road world champion Mads Pedersen of Trek–Segafredo took his first win in the rainbow jersey, as the Danish rider sprinted early and managed to hold off Bora–Hansgrohe's Pascal Ackermann and Deceuninck–Quick-Step's Davide Ballerini at the line.

Stage 2 Result
| Rank | Rider | Team | Time |
|---|---|---|---|
| 1 | Mads Pedersen (DEN) | Trek–Segafredo | 3h 26' 02" |
| 2 | Pascal Ackermann (GER) | Bora–Hansgrohe | + 0" |
| 3 | Davide Ballerini (ITA) | Deceuninck–Quick-Step | + 0" |
| 4 | Rudy Barbier (FRA) | Israel Start-Up Nation | + 0" |
| 5 | Alberto Dainese (ITA) | Team Sunweb | + 0" |
| 6 | Albert Torres (ESP) | Movistar Team | + 0" |
| 7 | Szymon Sajnok (POL) | CCC Team | + 0" |
| 8 | Jasper Philipsen (BEL) | UAE Team Emirates | + 0" |
| 9 | Piet Allegaert (BEL) | Cofidis | + 0" |
| 10 | Jürgen Roelandts (BEL) | Movistar Team | + 0" |

General classification after Stage 2
| Rank | Rider | Team | Time |
|---|---|---|---|
| 1 | Mads Pedersen (DEN) | Trek–Segafredo | 7h 57' 42" |
| 2 | Pascal Ackermann (GER) | Bora–Hansgrohe | + 4" |
| 3 | Kamil Małecki (POL) | CCC Team | + 4" |
| 4 | Luka Mezgec (SLO) | Mitchelton–Scott | + 6" |
| 5 | Davide Ballerini (ITA) | Deceuninck–Quick-Step | + 6" |
| 6 | Wout Poels (NED) | Bahrain–McLaren | + 9" |
| 7 | Jasper Philipsen (BEL) | UAE Team Emirates | + 10" |
| 8 | Szymon Sajnok (POL) | CCC Team | + 10" |
| 9 | Alberto Dainese (ITA) | Team Sunweb | + 10" |
| 10 | Mark Cavendish (GBR) | Bahrain–McLaren | + 10" |

=== Stage 3 ===
7 August 2020 – Wadowice to Bielsko-Biała, 203.1 km (126.2 mi)

On the uphill sprint finish, Ecuadorian rider Richard Carapaz of Team Ineos managed to catch everyone by surprise when he attacked with around 350 meters to go and managed to create enough separation from the peloton to hold on for the win, with Italian rider Diego Ulissi of UAE Team Emirates nearly catching Carapaz at the line to claim second. Commentators remarked that his effort was reminiscent of the one that Carapaz pulled when he won Stage 4 of the 2019 Giro d'Italia.

Stage 3 Result
| Rank | Rider | Team | Time |
|---|---|---|---|
| 1 | Richard Carapaz (ECU) | Team Ineos | 5h 04' 54" |
| 2 | Diego Ulissi (ITA) | UAE Team Emirates | + 0" |
| 3 | Rudy Molard (FRA) | Groupama–FDJ | + 0" |
| 4 | Jakob Fuglsang (DEN) | Astana | + 0" |
| 5 | Wilco Kelderman (NED) | Team Sunweb | + 0" |
| 6 | Luka Mezgec (SLO) | Mitchelton–Scott | + 0" |
| 7 | Jasper Stuyven (BEL) | Trek–Segafredo | + 0" |
| 8 | Ryan Gibbons (RSA) | NTT Pro Cycling | + 0" |
| 9 | Tim Wellens (BEL) | Lotto–Soudal | + 0" |
| 10 | Rafał Majka (POL) | Bora–Hansgrohe | + 0" |

General classification after Stage 3
| Rank | Rider | Team | Time |
|---|---|---|---|
| 1 | Richard Carapaz (ECU) | Team Ineos | 13h 02' 36" |
| 2 | Diego Ulissi (ITA) | UAE Team Emirates | + 4" |
| 3 | Kamil Małecki (POL) | CCC Team | + 4" |
| 4 | Luka Mezgec (SLO) | Mitchelton–Scott | + 6" |
| 5 | Rudy Molard (FRA) | Groupama–FDJ | + 6" |
| 6 | Ryan Gibbons (RSA) | NTT Pro Cycling | + 10" |
| 7 | Rui Costa (POR) | UAE Team Emirates | + 10" |
| 8 | Rafał Majka (POL) | Bora–Hansgrohe | + 10" |
| 9 | Neilson Powless (USA) | EF Pro Cycling | + 10" |
| 10 | Eddie Dunbar (IRL) | Team Ineos | + 10" |

=== Stage 4 ===
8 August 2020 – Terma Bukowina Tatrzańska to Bukowina Tatrzańska, 173 km (107 mi)

The day's breakaway was a quintet made of a trio of Australian riders (Nathan Haas of Cofidis, Chris Harper of Team Jumbo–Visma, and James Whelan of EF Pro Cycling) and a pair of Polish riders (Kamil Małecki of CCC Team and Patryk Stosz riding for the Polish national team). These five riders took all the points on offer at each of the first five KOM points, and Patryk Stosz was able to move into the lead of the mountains classification at the end of the day with the points he got. With around 62 kilometers to go, Haas and Stosz were dropped from the group, and a few kilometers later, the peloton caught up the rest of the breakaway.

With 51 kilometers to go, 20-year-old Belgian rider Remco Evenepoel of Deceuninck–Quick-Step managed to break and stay away for a solo victory. As he crossed the line, he dedicated his win to recovering teammate Fabio Jakobsen and held up a "75" bib number which Jakobsen wore. The next closest competitor, Danish rider Jakob Fuglsang of Astana, finished over a minute and a half behind Evenepoel, giving the Belgian a sizable lead heading into the final stage. Richard Carapaz, who was wearing the leader's yellow jersey, crashed earlier in the stage and struggled, finishing over three minutes behind Evenepoel and, as a result, dropped out of the top ten. Interestingly, the results of the stage meant that, for the fourth day in a row, new riders led the general, sprints, and mountains classifications.

Stage 4 Result
| Rank | Rider | Team | Time |
|---|---|---|---|
| 1 | Remco Evenepoel (BEL) | Deceuninck–Quick-Step | 3h 55' 52" |
| 2 | Jakob Fuglsang (DEN) | Astana | + 1' 48" |
| 3 | Simon Yates (GBR) | Mitchelton–Scott | + 2' 22" |
| 4 | Rafał Majka (POL) | Bora–Hansgrohe | + 2' 22" |
| 5 | Diego Ulissi (ITA) | UAE Team Emirates | + 3' 05" |
| 6 | Wilco Kelderman (NED) | Team Sunweb | + 3' 05" |
| 7 | Kamil Małecki (POL) | CCC Team | + 3' 08" |
| 8 | Mikel Nieve (ESP) | Mitchelton–Scott | + 3' 08" |
| 9 | Jonas Vingegaard (DEN) | Team Jumbo–Visma | + 3' 08" |
| 10 | Maximilian Schachmann (GER) | Bora–Hansgrohe | + 3' 09" |

General classification after Stage 4
| Rank | Rider | Team | Time |
|---|---|---|---|
| 1 | Remco Evenepoel (BEL) | Deceuninck–Quick-Step | 16h 58' 28" |
| 2 | Jakob Fuglsang (DEN) | Astana | + 1' 52" |
| 3 | Simon Yates (GBR) | Mitchelton–Scott | + 2' 28" |
| 4 | Rafał Majka (POL) | Bora–Hansgrohe | + 2' 32" |
| 5 | Diego Ulissi (ITA) | UAE Team Emirates | + 3' 09" |
| 6 | Kamil Małecki (POL) | CCC Team | + 3' 12" |
| 7 | Wilco Kelderman (NED) | Team Sunweb | + 3' 15" |
| 8 | Jonas Vingegaard (DEN) | Team Jumbo–Visma | + 3' 18" |
| 9 | Mikel Nieve (ESP) | Mitchelton–Scott | + 3' 18" |
| 10 | Rui Costa (POR) | UAE Team Emirates | + 3' 19" |

=== Stage 5 ===
9 August 2020 – Zakopane to Kraków, 188 km (117 mi)

The original breakaway of the day contained four riders. Australian rider James Whelan of EF Pro Cycling, who was in the breakaway the day before, was joined by French rider Geoffrey Bouchard of AG2R La Mondiale, Canadian rider Hugo Houle of Astana, and British rider Luke Rowe of Team Ineos, while Przemysław Kasperkiewicz, riding for the Polish national team, soon bridged across to make it a quintet. With under 70 kilometers to go, two more riders made it across to the breakaway, those being Dutch rider Jos van Emden of Team Jumbo–Visma and Bouchard's teammate and fellow Frenchman Alexis Gougeard. Kasperkiewicz, who had won both of the KOM sprints since he joined the breakaway, was the first to be dropped from it. However, it was only under around 7 kilometers left did the peloton finally catch up to the rest of the breakaway, and several teams, including Groupama–FDJ and Trek–Segafredo, began pulling on the front for their sprinters. In the end, it was Italian rider Davide Ballerini of Deceuninck–Quick-Step, one of Fabio Jakobsen's leadout men, that won in a close sprint just ahead of the heavy favorite, German rider Pascal Ackermann of Bora–Hansgrohe.

Stage 5 Result
| Rank | Rider | Team | Time |
|---|---|---|---|
| 1 | Davide Ballerini (ITA) | Deceuninck–Quick-Step | 4h 31' 22" |
| 2 | Pascal Ackermann (GER) | Bora–Hansgrohe | + 0" |
| 3 | Alberto Dainese (ITA) | Team Sunweb | + 0" |
| 4 | Ryan Gibbons (RSA) | NTT Pro Cycling | + 0" |
| 5 | Jasper Philipsen (BEL) | UAE Team Emirates | + 0" |
| 6 | Rudy Barbier (FRA) | Israel Start-Up Nation | + 0" |
| 7 | Juan Sebastián Molano (COL) | UAE Team Emirates | + 0" |
| 8 | Phil Bauhaus (GER) | Bahrain–McLaren | + 0" |
| 9 | Szymon Sajnok (POL) | CCC Team | + 0" |
| 10 | Albert Torres (ESP) | Movistar Team | + 0" |

General classification after Stage 5
| Rank | Rider | Team | Time |
|---|---|---|---|
| 1 | Remco Evenepoel (BEL) | Deceuninck–Quick-Step | 21h 29' 50" |
| 2 | Jakob Fuglsang (DEN) | Astana | + 1' 52" |
| 3 | Simon Yates (GBR) | Mitchelton–Scott | + 2' 28" |
| 4 | Rafał Majka (POL) | Bora–Hansgrohe | + 2' 32" |
| 5 | Diego Ulissi (ITA) | UAE Team Emirates | + 3' 09" |
| 6 | Kamil Małecki (POL) | CCC Team | + 3' 12" |
| 7 | Wilco Kelderman (NED) | Team Sunweb | + 3' 15" |
| 8 | Jonas Vingegaard (DEN) | Team Jumbo–Visma | + 3' 18" |
| 9 | Mikel Nieve (ESP) | Mitchelton–Scott | + 3' 18" |
| 10 | Rui Costa (POR) | UAE Team Emirates | + 3' 19" |

== Classification leadership table ==
Classification leadership by stage
| Stage | Winner | General classification (Polish: Żółta koszulka) | Sprints classification (Polish: Klasyfikacja sprinterska) | Mountains classification (Polish: Klasyfikacja górska) | Active rider classification (Polish: Klasyfikacja najaktywniejszych) | Polish rider classification (Polish: Najlepszy Polak) | Teams classification (Polish: Klasyfikacja drużynowa) |
|---|---|---|---|---|---|---|---|
| 1 | Fabio Jakobsen | Fabio Jakobsen | Fabio Jakobsen | Kamil Małecki | Maciej Paterski | Kamil Małecki | UAE Team Emirates |
| 2 | Mads Pedersen | Mads Pedersen | Jasper Philipsen | Julius van den Berg | Maciej Paterski | Kamil Małecki | UAE Team Emirates |
| 3 | Richard Carapaz | Richard Carapaz | Luka Mezgec | Kamil Gradek | Maciej Paterski | Kamil Małecki | Bora–Hansgrohe |
| 4 | Remco Evenepoel | Remco Evenepoel | Diego Ulissi | Patryk Stosz | Maciej Paterski | Rafał Majka | Mitchelton–Scott |
| 5 | Davide Ballerini | Remco Evenepoel | Luka Mezgec | Patryk Stosz | Maciej Paterski | Rafał Majka | Mitchelton–Scott |
| Final | | Remco Evenepoel | Luka Mezgec | Patryk Stosz | Maciej Paterski | Rafał Majka | Mitchelton–Scott |

- On stage two, Kamil Małecki, who was third in the general classification, wore the yellow jersey, because first placed Fabio Jakobsen and second placed Marc Sarreau did not start in stage two due to injuries.
- On stage two, Luka Mezgec, who was third in the sprints classification, wore the white jersey, because first placed Fabio Jakobsen and second placed Marc Sarreau did not start in stage two due to injuries.
- On stage two, Julius van den Berg, who was second in the mountains classification, wore the blue polkadot jersey, because first placed Kamil Małecki wore the yellow jersey as the best placed rider in the general classification that started stage two.

== Classification standings ==
Legend
| Denotes the winner of the general classification | Denotes the winner of the mountains classification |
| Denotes the winner of the sprints classification | Denotes the winner of the active rider classification |

=== General classification ===
Final general classification (1–10)
| Rank | Rider | Team | Time |
|---|---|---|---|
| 1 | Remco Evenepoel (BEL) | Deceuninck–Quick-Step | 21h 29' 50" |
| 2 | Jakob Fuglsang (DEN) | Astana | + 1' 52" |
| 3 | Simon Yates (GBR) | Mitchelton–Scott | + 2' 28" |
| 4 | Rafał Majka (POL) | Bora–Hansgrohe | + 2' 32" |
| 5 | Diego Ulissi (ITA) | UAE Team Emirates | + 3' 09" |
| 6 | Kamil Małecki (POL) | CCC Team | + 3' 12" |
| 7 | Wilco Kelderman (NED) | Team Sunweb | + 3' 15" |
| 8 | Jonas Vingegaard (DEN) | Team Jumbo–Visma | + 3' 18" |
| 9 | Mikel Nieve (ESP) | Mitchelton–Scott | + 3' 18" |
| 10 | Rui Costa (POR) | UAE Team Emirates | + 3' 19" |

=== Sprints classification ===
Final sprints classification (1–10)
| Rank | Rider | Team | Points |
|---|---|---|---|
| 1 | Luka Mezgec (SLO) | Mitchelton–Scott | 48 |
| 2 | Jasper Philipsen (BEL) | UAE Team Emirates | 46 |
| 3 | Ryan Gibbons (RSA) | NTT Pro Cycling | 46 |
| 4 | Diego Ulissi (ITA) | UAE Team Emirates | 45 |
| 5 | Pascal Ackermann (GER) | Bora–Hansgrohe | 44 |
| 6 | Szymon Sajnok (POL) | CCC Team | 41 |
| 7 | Davide Ballerini (ITA) | Deceuninck–Quick-Step | 38 |
| 8 | Alberto Dainese (ITA) | Team Sunweb | 37 |
| 9 | Jakob Fuglsang (DEN) | Astana | 36 |
| 10 | Rudy Barbier (FRA) | Israel Start-Up Nation | 32 |

=== Mountains classification ===
Final mountains classification (1–10)
| Rank | Rider | Team | Points |
|---|---|---|---|
| 1 | Patryk Stosz (POL) | Poland | 64 |
| 2 | Kamil Gradek (POL) | CCC Team | 42 |
| 3 | Nathan Haas (AUS) | Cofidis | 36 |
| 4 | Remco Evenepoel (BEL) | Deceuninck–Quick-Step | 35 |
| 5 | Taco van der Hoorn (NED) | Team Jumbo–Visma | 28 |
| 6 | Chris Harper (AUS) | Team Jumbo–Visma | 22 |
| 7 | James Whelan (AUS) | EF Pro Cycling | 22 |
| 8 | Kamil Małecki (POL) | CCC Team | 19 |
| 9 | Jakob Fuglsang (DEN) | Astana | 17 |
| 10 | Przemysław Kasperkiewicz (POL) | Poland | 15 |

=== Active rider classification ===
Final active rider classification (1–10)
| Rank | Rider | Team | Points |
|---|---|---|---|
| 1 | Maciej Paterski (POL) | Poland | 15 |
| 2 | Kamil Małecki (POL) | CCC Team | 6 |
| 3 | Taco van der Hoorn (NED) | Team Jumbo–Visma | 4 |
| 4 | Kamil Gradek (POL) | CCC Team | 4 |
| 5 | Patryk Stosz (POL) | Poland | 4 |
| 6 | Geoffrey Bouchard (FRA) | AG2R La Mondiale | 3 |
| 7 | Hugo Houle (CAN) | Astana | 2 |
| 8 | James Whelan (AUS) | EF Pro Cycling | 1 |
| 9 | Wout Poels (NED) | Bahrain–McLaren | 1 |
| 10 | Nils Eekhoff (NED) | Team Sunweb | 1 |

=== Teams classification ===
Final teams classification (1–10)
| Rank | Team | Time |
|---|---|---|
| 1 | Mitchelton–Scott | 64h 38' 39" |
| 2 | Bora–Hansgrohe | + 1" |
| 3 | Team Sunweb | + 1' 40" |
| 4 | Astana | + 8' 01" |
| 5 | CCC Team | + 11' 26" |
| 6 | UAE Team Emirates | + 13' 49" |
| 7 | Team Jumbo–Visma | + 14' 26" |
| 8 | Groupama–FDJ | + 14' 53" |
| 9 | Team Ineos | + 15' 07" |
| 10 | Cofidis | + 16' 17" |
