= Ben Hill (cyclist) =

Australian cyclist (born 1990)

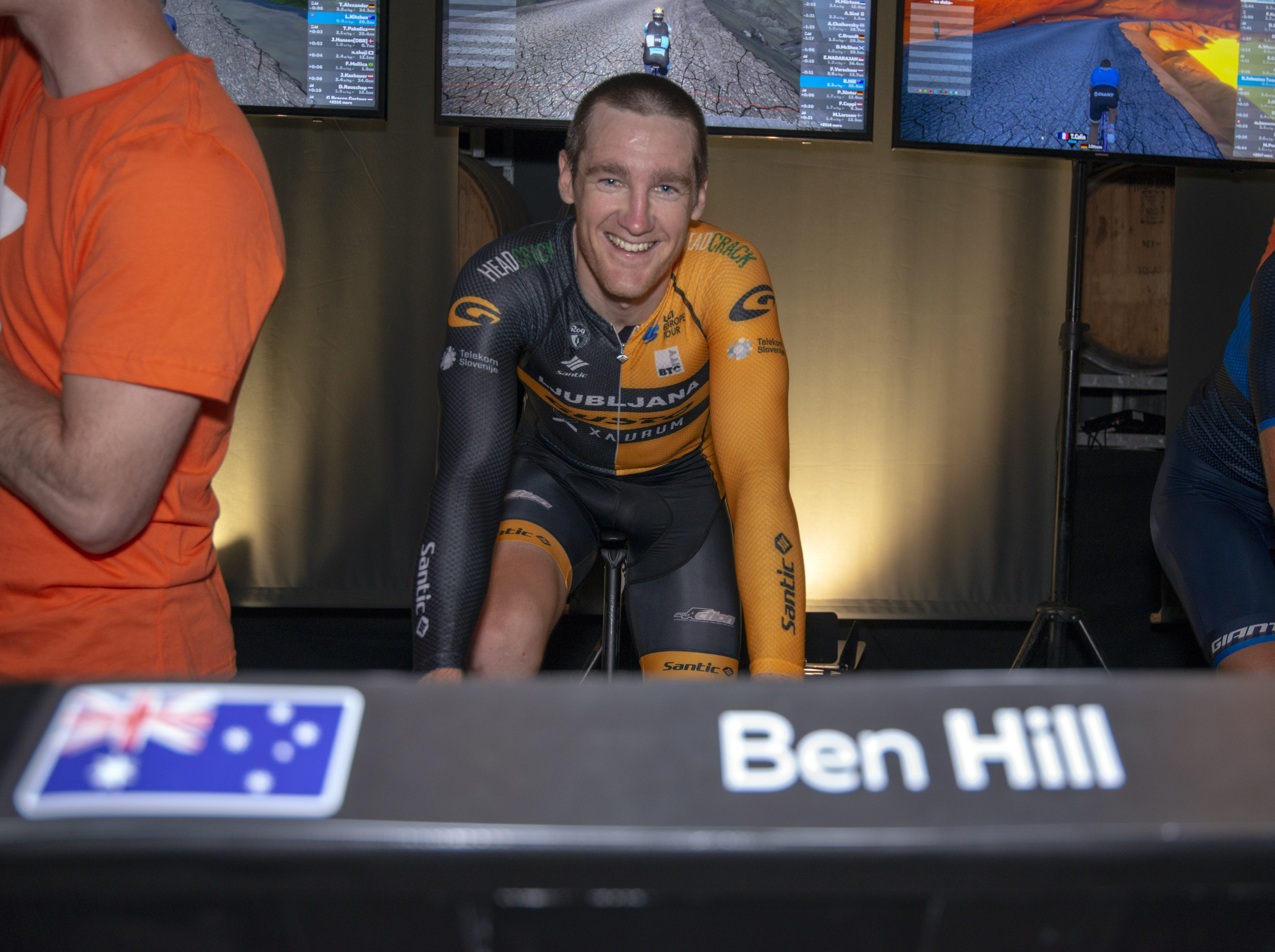
- Ben Hill in 2019

Personal information
- Full name: Benjamin Hill
- Born: 5 February 1990 (age 36) Scone, New South Wales, Australia
- Height: 1.79 m (5 ft 10 in)
- Weight: 67 kg (148 lb)

Cycling career
- Sport: Cycling
- Discipline: Road
- Role: Rider

Amateur team
- 2022–: Team CCS Canberra Men

Professional teams
- 2013: Hincapie Sportswear Development Team
- 2015: Charter Mason–Giant Racing Team
- 2016–2017: Attaque Team Gusto
- 2018–2019: Ljubljana Gusto Xaurum
- 2020: Team BridgeLane
Medal record
Cycling esports
Representing Team Epic
Olympic Esports Series
Silver medal – second place	2023 Singapore	Zwift

Benjamin Hill (born 5 February 1990) is an Australian cyclist, who last rode for UCI Continental team Team BridgeLane.

== Career ==
Hill was suspended for 2 years from cycling by the Australian Sports Anti-Doping Authority for testing positive for Methylhexanamine during the 2012 Tour of Tasmania. Hill admitted the error immediately after a teammate gave him the substance instead of caffeine. Hill tried to fight his suspension stating it was unfair he was given 2 years when people who purposely blood doped got 6 months. In the 2016 cycling season Hill was supposed to ride for Dynamo Cover, a new UCI Continental team which folded before it even started racing. This left Hill among others looking for a new team for 2016. At the National race, Cootamundra Annual Classic, Hill finished in first place, his partner Rebecca Wiasak also won her event. In 2017 at the Tour of Hainan Hill crashed during stage 8 and fractured 7 vertebrae ending his season early. At the 2020 Herald Sun Tour Hill spent every stage in the breakaway earning himself enough points to win the green sprinters jersey.

Since 2020 Hill has been working as a cycling coach at Today's Plan.

== Major results ==
2016
1st Overall Tour of Thailand
1st Sprints classification Herald Sun Tour
6th Tour of Yancheng Coastal Wetlands
2017
1st Overall Tour de Tochigi

1st Points classification
1st Mountains classification

1st Mountains classification Herald Sun Tour
7th Japan Cup Cycle Road Race
8th National Criterium Championships
2019
1st Stage 3 Tour of Japan
1st Trofeo Alcide Degasperi
2020
1st Sprints classification Herald Sun Tour
5th UCI Esports World Championships
8th Overall Tour de Taiwan
2022
4th UCI Esports World Championships
