= Wilco Kelderman =

Dutch road cyclist (born 1991)

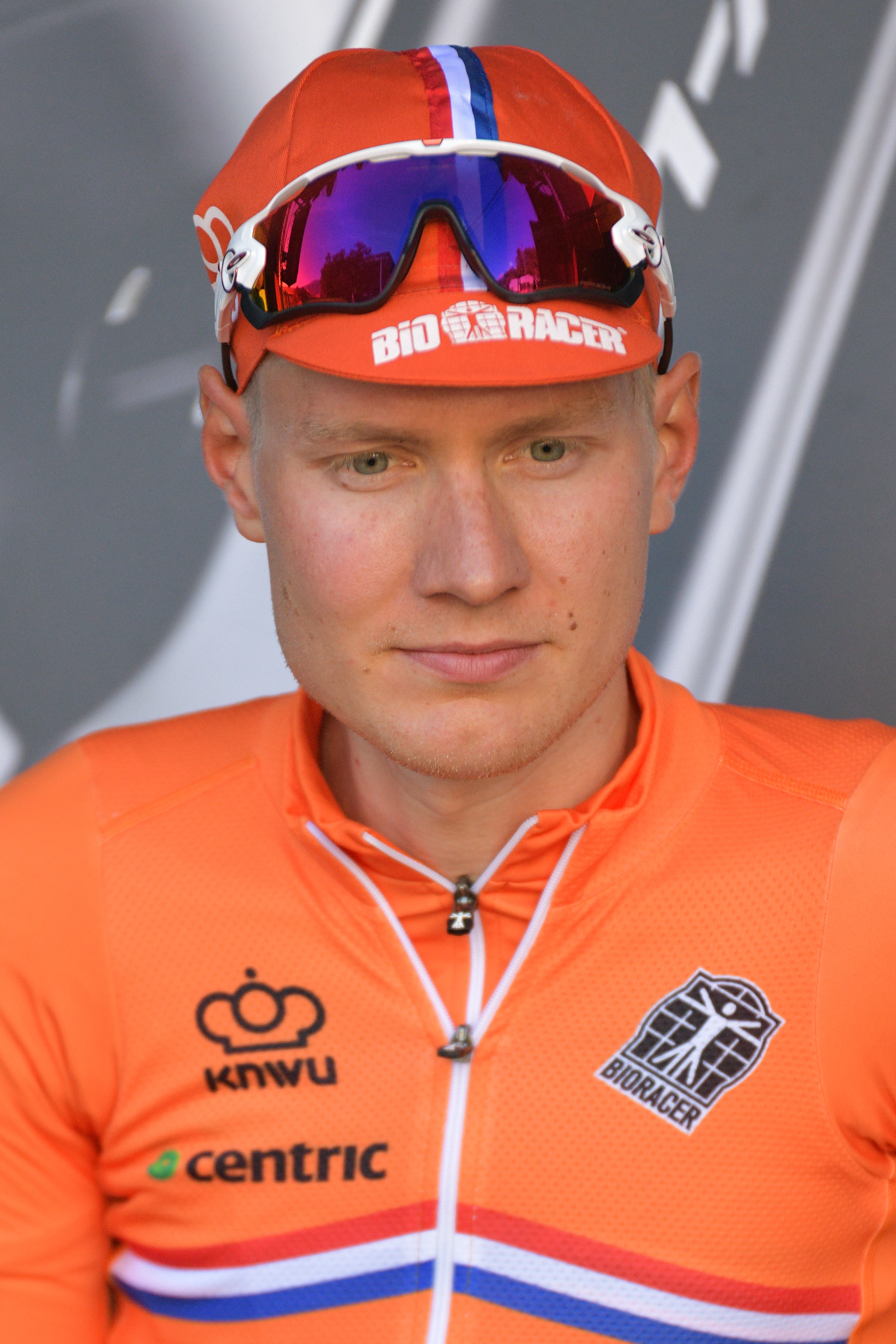
- Kelderman in 2018

Personal information
- Full name: Wilco Kelderman
- Born: 25 March 1991 (age 35) Amersfoort, Netherlands
- Height: 1.85 m (6 ft 1 in)
- Weight: 65 kg (143 lb)

Cycling career
- Sport: Cycling
- Current team: Visma–Lease a Bike
- Discipline: Road
- Role: Rider
- Rider type: All-rounder; Climber

Professional teams
- 2010–2011: Rabobank Continental Team
- 2012–2016: Rabobank
- 2017–2020: Team Sunweb
- 2021–2022: Bora–Hansgrohe
- 2023–: Team Jumbo–Visma

Major wins
- Stage races Danmark Rundt (2013) One-day races and Classics National Road Race Championships (2026) National Time Trial Championships (2015)
Medal record
Representing Team Sunweb
World Championships
Gold medal – first place	2017 Bergen	Team time trial
Silver medal – second place	2018 Innsbruck	Team time trial

Wilco Kelderman (born 25 March 1991) is a Dutch professional road bicycle racer who rides for UCI WorldTeam Visma–Lease a Bike.

== Professional career ==
=== Rabobank teams (2010–2016) ===
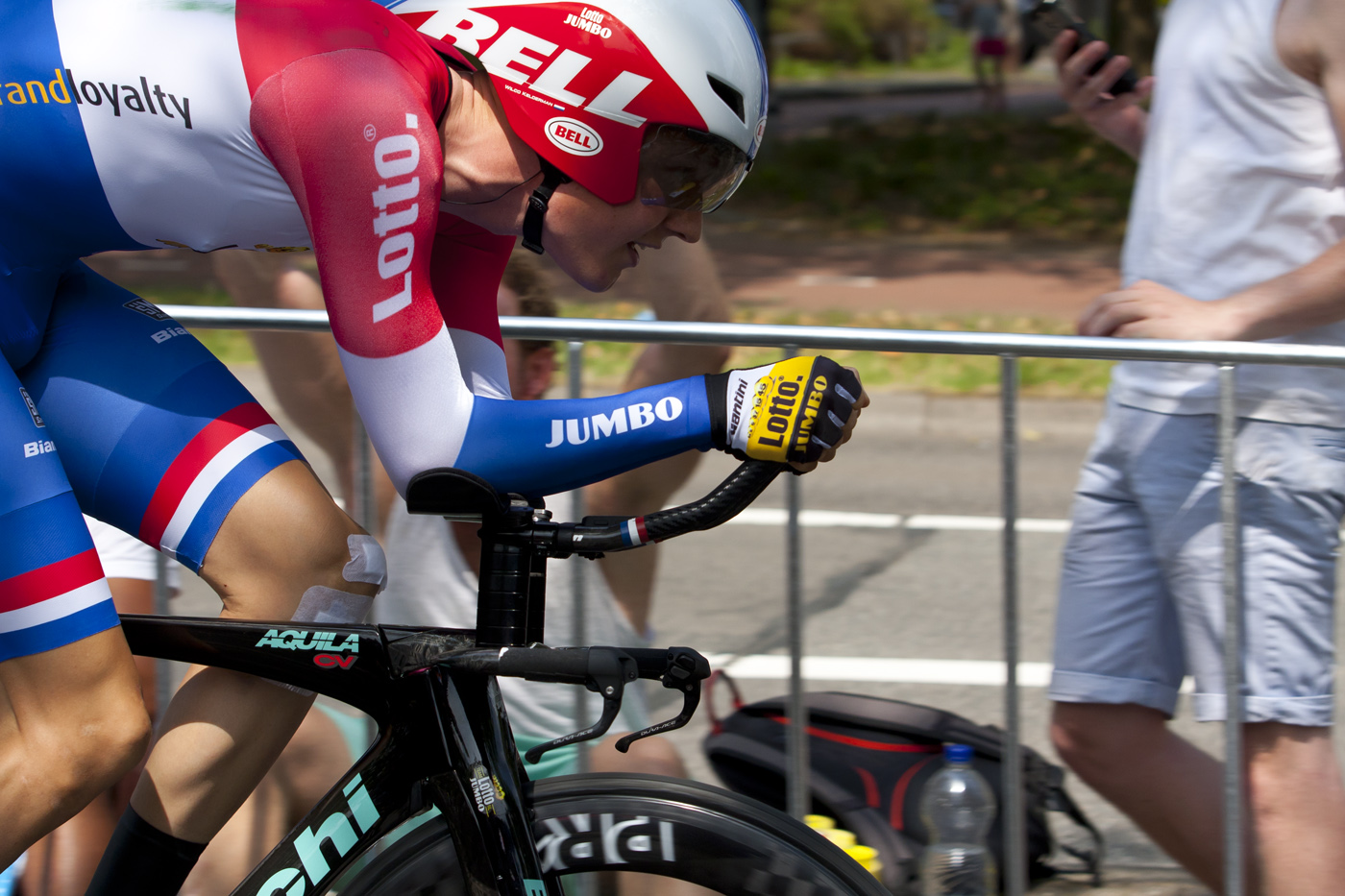
Kelderman at the 2015 Tour de France.

Born in Amersfoort, Kelderman finished in seventh position in the general classification of the 2014 Giro d'Italia. He broke his collarbone in the ensuing off-season while training. He was named in the start list for the 2015 Tour de France and finished in ninth place in the opening individual time trial. The following year he rode the Tour de France and placed 32nd overall.

=== Team Sunweb (2017–2020) ===
Kelderman moved to Team Sunweb for the 2017 season. He finished in the top ten of the Vuelta a España in three successive editions, between 2017 and 2019. At the 2020 Giro d'Italia, held in October due to the COVID-19 pandemic in Italy, he held the overall lead after stages 18 and 19, but lost time to Tao Geoghegan Hart and Jai Hindley; as a result, he finished in third overall.

=== Bora–Hansgrohe (2021–2022) ===
Kelderman joined the Bora–Hansgrohe team in 2021 on a two-year contract. He recorded top-five overall finishes at the Volta a Catalunya, the Critérium du Dauphiné and the Tour de France in his first season for the team. In his second season, he finished third at the Circuito de Getxo.

=== Team Jumbo–Visma ===
In August 2022, it was announced that Kelderman was to join Team Jumbo–Visma from the 2023 season, on a three-year contract. In his first season with the team, he finished in fourth place at the Tour de Suisse, and was a part of Grand Tour successes for Jonas Vingegaard at the Tour de France, and Sepp Kuss at the Vuelta a España.

== Major results ==
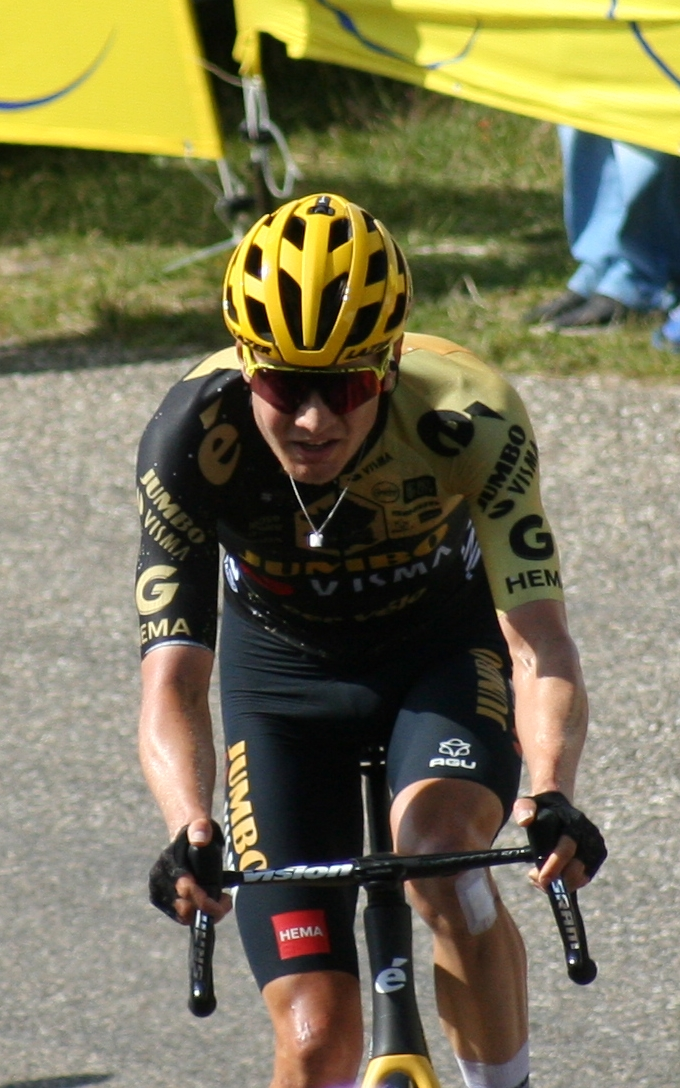
Kelderman at the 2023 Tour de France

2008
1st Time trial, National Junior Road Championships
1st Overall Liège–La Gleize
1st Stage 1 Tour de la région de Łódź
2nd Overall Giro della Lunigiana
3rd Overall Trofeo Karlsberg

1st Young rider classification

5th Overall Grand Prix Général Patton
2009
1st Overall Internationale 3-Etappen-Rundfahrt

1st Stage 3

4th Overall 3 Giorni Orobica

1st Stage 3

10th Overall Trofeo Karlsberg
2010
1st Overall Tour Alsace

1st Stage 5

3rd Overall Le Triptyque des Monts et Châteaux
3rd Overall Tour du Gévaudan Languedoc-Roussillon
3rd Skandis GP
5th Overall Istrian Spring Trophy
5th Overall Ringerike GP
5th Scandinavian Race Uppsala
8th Overall Circuit des Ardennes
8th Rund um den Finanzplatz Eschborn–Frankfurt U23
9th Rogaland GP
10th Overall Tour de l'Avenir
10th Grand Prix des Marbriers
2011 (1 pro win)
1st Time trial, National Under-23 Road Championships
1st Overall Tour of Norway

1st Young rider classification

1st Overall Thüringen Rundfahrt der U23

1st Stages 5 (ITT) & 6

1st Prologue Tour de l'Ain
5th Rogaland GP
7th Overall Grande Prémio Crédito Agrícola de la Costa Azul
8th Route Adélie de Vitré
2012
6th Rund um Köln
7th Overall Tour of California

1st Young rider classification

7th Overall Danmark Rundt

1st Young rider classification

8th Overall Critérium du Dauphiné

1st Young rider classification

10th Overall Vuelta a Andalucía
2013 (2)
1st Overall Danmark Rundt

1st Points classification
1st Young rider classification
1st Stage 5 (ITT)

5th Overall Tour de Romandie

1st Young rider classification

6th Overall Tour Down Under
7th Overall Eneco Tour
2014
4th Overall Critérium du Dauphiné

1st Young rider classification

5th Overall Volta ao Algarve
5th Overall Tour of Utah
7th Overall Giro d'Italia
2015 (1)
1st Time trial, National Road Championships
3rd Overall Eneco Tour
6th Grand Prix Cycliste de Montréal
8th Volta Limburg Classic
9th Overall Volta a Catalunya

1st Young rider classification

10th La Flèche Wallonne
2016
2nd Overall Tour du Poitou Charentes

1st Young rider classification

3rd Time trial, National Road Championships
4th Overall Vuelta a Andalucía
6th Overall Eneco Tour
8th Overall Tour de Suisse
10th Overall Tour of the Basque Country
2017
UCI Road World Championships

1st Team time trial
7th Time trial

4th Overall Vuelta a España
4th Overall Tour de Pologne
7th Overall Tour de Romandie
9th Overall Tour Down Under
2018
2nd Team time trial, UCI Road World Championships
2nd Overall Abu Dhabi Tour
3rd Time trial, National Road Championships
5th Overall Tour de Suisse
6th Milano–Torino
6th Tre Valli Varesine
10th Overall Vuelta a España
2019
5th Overall UAE Tour
7th Overall Vuelta a España
2020
3rd Overall Giro d'Italia

Held after Stages 18–19

4th Overall Tirreno–Adriatico
5th Overall Tour de la Provence
6th Overall UAE Tour
7th Overall Tour de Pologne
2021
4th Overall Critérium du Dauphiné
5th Overall Tour de France
5th Overall Volta a Catalunya
10th Overall Tour de Romandie
2022
3rd Circuito de Getxo
9th Overall Vuelta a Burgos
2023
4th Overall Tour de Suisse
2024
3rd Overall Tour de Pologne
7th Giro dell'Emilia
8th Overall Paris–Nice
9th Overall Tour de Suisse
2026 (1)
1st Road race, National Road Championships

=== General classification results timeline ===
Grand Tour general classification results
Grand Tour	2012	2013	2014	2015	2016	2017	2018	2019	2020	2021	2022	2023	2024	2025	2026
Giro d'Italia	—	17	7	—	—	DNF	—	—	3	—	17	—	—	37	DNF
Tour de France	—	—	—	79	32	—	—	DNF	—	5	—	18	21	—	
Vuelta a España	—	—	14	—	—	4	10	7	—	—	18	25	—	62	
Major stage race general classification results
Race	2012	2013	2014	2015	2016	2017	2018	2019	2020	2021	2022	2023	2024	2025	2026
Paris–Nice	—	DNF	13	15	13	—	—	14	—	—	—	—	8	—	45
Tirreno–Adriatico	—	—	—	—	—	—	DNF	—	4	—	19	DNF	—	—	—
Volta a Catalunya	DNF	—	12	9	DNF	—	—	DNF	NH	5	—	—	—	21	—
Tour of the Basque Country	—	—	—	—	10	—	—	—	NH	DNF	—	—	—	17	—
Tour de Romandie	30	5	—	—	31	7	—	—	NH	10	—	—	—	—	—
Critérium du Dauphiné	8	—	4	22	—	—	—	—	—	4	28	—	—	—	
Tour de Suisse	—	31	—	—	8	—	5	29	NH	—	—	4	9	—	

=== Classics results timeline ===
Monument	2012	2013	2014	2015	2016	2017	2018	2019	2020	2021	2022	2023
Milan–San Remo	Has not contested during his career											
Tour of Flanders	Has not contested during his career											
Paris–Roubaix	Has not contested during his career											
Liège–Bastogne–Liège	—	—	—	37	—	—	—	—	—	27	DNF	—
Giro di Lombardia	—	—	—	—	—	18	48	38	19	—	60	65

Legend
—	Did not compete
DNF	Did not finish
NH	Not held
IP	In progress
