= Attaque Team Gusto =

Cycling team

Team information
- UCI code: ATG
- Registered: Republic of China (Taiwan) (2014–2016); Slovenia (2017)
- Founded: 2014
- Discipline: Road
- Status: UCI Continental

Team name history
- 2014 2015–2017: Team Gusto; Attaque Team Gusto

Attaque Team Gusto was a Taiwanese UCI Continental cycling team established in 2014. The team folded after the 2017 season, and the sponsor and some team members merged to Team Ljubljana Gusto Xaurum.

== Final roster (2017) ==
| Rider | Date of birth |
|---|---|
| Chen Chien Chou (TWN) | 2 December 1997 (aged 20) |
| Alistair Donohoe (AUS) | 3 March 1995 (aged 22) |
| Timothy Guy (AUS) | 16 May 1989 (aged 28) |
| Ben Hill (AUS) | 5 February 1990 (aged 27) |
| Wen Chung Huang (TWN) | 20 September 1990 (aged 27) |
| Guy Kalma (AUS) | 19 January 1995 (aged 22) |
| Vladimir Kerkez (SLO) | 1 March 1984 (aged 33) |
| Nik Kranjec (SLO) | 26 May 1998 (aged 19) |

| Rider | Date of birth |
|---|---|
| Martin Lavrič (SLO) | 28 November 1998 (aged 19) |
| Shao Hsuan Lu (TWN) | 26 March 1994 (aged 23) |
| Alder Martz (USA) | 9 November 1990 (aged 27) |
| Jaka Paulič (SLO) | 29 November 1998 (aged 19) |
| Szymon Sajnok (POL) | 24 August 1997 (aged 20) |
| Alexandr Shushemoin (KAZ) | 26 February 1987 (aged 30) |
| Mario Vogt (GER) | 17 January 1992 (aged 25) |

== Major wins ==
2014
Stage 3 Tour of Thailand, Feng Chun-kai
Taiwan National Road Race championships, Feng Chun-kai
2015
Stage 1 Tour de Filipinas, Eric Sheppard
Stage 4 Tour of Thailand, Ronald Yeung
Stage 3 Tour de Kumano, Thomas Rabou
Stage 4 Tour de Singkarak, Thomas Rabou
2016
GP Capodarco, Jai Hindley
Overall Tour of Thailand, Benjamin Hill
Stage 4 Tour de Filipinas, Timothy Guy
Stage 3 Tour of Taihu Lake, Cameron Bayly
2017
Overall Tour de Tochigi, Benjamin Hill

Points classification, Benjamin Hill
Mountains classification, Benjamin Hill

Prologue Tour de Kumano, Szymon Sajnok

== National champions ==
2014
Taiwan Road Race, Feng Chun-kai
