= Rudy Porter =

Australian cyclist (born 2000)

Personal information
- Born: 15 December 2000 (age 25) Australia
- Height: 1.79 m (5 ft 10 in)

Cycling career
- Sport: Cycling
- Discipline: Road
- Role: Rider

Amateur team
- 2019–2020: Inform TM Insight Make

Professional teams
- 2021–2022: Trinity Racing
- 2023–2024: Team Jayco–AlUla

Rudy Porter (born 15 December 2000) is an Australian racing cyclist, who last rode for UCI WorldTeam Team Jayco–AlUla. On 25 July 2022 it was announced Rudy would ride for UCI WorldTeam Team BikeExchange–Jayco in 2023.

== Major results ==
2020
9th Overall Herald Sun Tour
2021
2nd Road race, National Under-23 Road Championships
10th Overall Tour Alsace
2022
2nd Overall Course de la Paix U23 – Grand Prix Jeseníky
4th Overall Alpes Isère Tour
4th Overall Santos Festival of Cycling
