= 2020 UCI Oceania Tour =

- Sixteenth edition of the UCI Oceania Tour

Details
- Dates: 15 January – 9 February
- Location: Oceania
- Races: 4

Champions
- Individual champion: (Australia) Caleb Ewan (Lotto–Soudal)
- Teams' champion: St George Continental Cycling Team
- Nations' champion: Australia

The 2020 UCI Oceania Tour was the 16th season of the UCI Oceania Tour. The season began on 15 January 2020 with the New Zealand Cycle Classic and finished on 9 February 2020 with the Herald Sun Tour.

Throughout the season, points were awarded to the top finishers of stages within stage races and the final general classification standings of each of the stages races and one-day events. The quality and complexity of a race also determined how many points were awarded to the top finishers, the higher the UCI rating of a race, the more points were awarded. The UCI ratings from highest to lowest were are as follows:

- Multi-day events: 2.1 and 2.2
- One-day events: 1.1 and 1.2

== Teams ==
The seven teams which competed in the 2020 tour were:

Code	Official Team Name	Country
ACA	ARA Pro Racing Sunshine Coast	Australia
BSC	Black Spoke Pro Cycling Academy	New Zealand
CMI	EuroCyclingTrips - CMI Pro Cycling	Guam
NER	Nero Continental	Australia
OLI	Oliver's Real Food Racing	Australia
STG	St George Continental Cycling Team	Australia
BLN	Team BridgeLane	Australia

== Events ==
Date	Race Name	Location	UCI Rating	Winner	Team	Ref.
15–19 January	New Zealand Cycle Classic	New Zealand	2.2	Rylee Field (AUS)	Team BridgeLane	
25 January	Gravel and Tar	New Zealand	1.2	Hayden McCormick (NZL)	Black Spoke Pro Cycling Academy	
30 January	Race Torquay	Australia	1.1	Sam Bennett (IRL)	Deceuninck–Quick-Step	
5–9 February	Herald Sun Tour	Australia	2.1	Jai Hindley (AUS)	Team Sunweb	

Due to the ongoing impact and restrictions associated with the global COVID-19 pandemic, the Tour of Brisbane, which was to include the 2020 Oceania Road Championships will not take place in 2020.
