= Charles-Étienne Chrétien =

Canadian cyclist

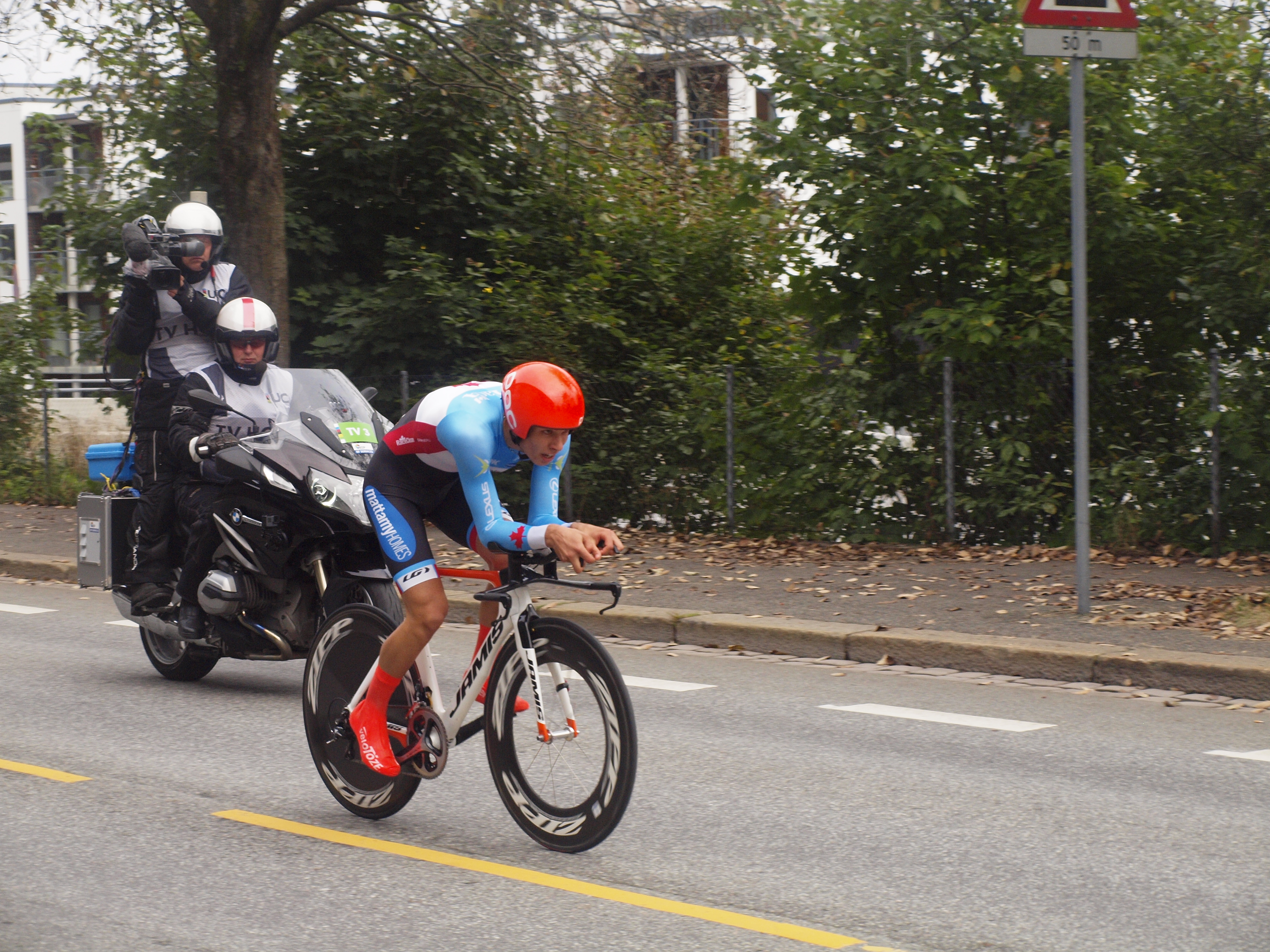
- Chrétien in 2017

Personal information
- Born: 16 June 1999 (age 27) Amos, Quebec, Canada
- Height: 1.77 m (5 ft 10 in)
- Weight: 65 kg (143 lb)

Cycling career
- Sport: Cycling
- Discipline: Road
- Role: Rider

Amateur team
- 2021: Laboral Kutxa

Professional teams
- 2018: Silber Pro Cycling Team
- 2019: Interpro Cycling Academy
- 2020: Aevolo
- 2021: Rally Cycling (stagiaire)
- 2022: Premier Tech U-23 Cycling Project
- 2022: Human Powered Health (stagiaire)
- 2023: Human Powered Health
Medal record
Men's road bicycle racing
Representing Canada
Pan American Championships
Bronze medal – third place	2023 Panama City	Road race

Charles-Étienne Chrétien (born 16 June 1999) is a Canadian cyclist, who last rode for UCI ProTeam Human Powered Health.

== Major results ==
2017
National Junior Road Championships

1st Road race
2nd Time trial

1st Stage 2 Green Mountain Stage Race Juniors
2021
1st San Gregorio Saria
1st Mémorial José María Anza
2022
7th Flèche Ardennaise
9th Overall Tour de Normandie
2023
3rd Road race, Pan American Road Championships
