= Michael Rice (cyclist) =

Australian cyclist

Personal information
- Full name: Michael Rice
- Born: 25 January 1996 (age 30) Canberra, Australia
- Height: 1.78 m (5 ft 10 in)

Cycling career
- Sport: Cycling
- Discipline: Road
- Role: Rider

Amateur team
- 2014: Search2retain–Health.com.au

Professional teams
- 2015: Search2retain–Health.com.au
- 2016: Garneau–Québecor
- 2017–2019: Axeon–Hagens Berman
- 2020–2021: ARA Pro Racing Sunshine Coast

Michael Rice (born 25 January 1996) is an Australian road cyclist, who last rode for UCI Continental team ARA Skip Capital. He competed in the 2018 Tour of California.

== Major results ==
2013
1st Road race, National Junior Road Championships
2016
1st Stage 3b Tour de Beauce
2018
1st Stage 4 Tour of the Gila
