= 2020 Tirreno–Adriatico =

Cycling race

2020 UCI World Tour, race 13 of 21

Race details
- Dates: 7–14 September 2020
- Stages: 8
- Distance: 1,309.05 km (813.41 mi)

Results
Jersey awarded to the overall winner	Winner	Simon Yates (GBR)	(Mitchelton–Scott)
	Second	Geraint Thomas (GBR)	(INEOS Grenadiers)
	Third	Rafał Majka (POL)	(Bora–Hansgrohe)
Jersey awarded to the points classification winner	Points	Pascal Ackermann (GER)	(Bora–Hansgrohe)
Jersey awarded to the mountains classification winner	Mountains	Héctor Carretero (ESP)	(Movistar Team)
Jersey awarded to the young rider classification winner	Young rider	Aleksandr Vlasov (RUS)	(Astana)
	Team	Team Sunweb	

The 2020 Tirreno–Adriatico was a road cycling stage race that was originally scheduled to take place between 11 and 17 March 2020 in Italy. On 6 March 2020, it was postponed due to COVID-19 concerns in Italy and rescheduled to 7 to 14 September. It was the 55th edition of Tirreno–Adriatico and part of the 2020 UCI World Tour.

== Teams ==
All nineteen UCI WorldTeams and six wildcard UCI ProTeams made up the twenty-four teams that participated in the race. Each team entered seven riders, making up a starting peloton of 175 riders. Of these riders, 152 finished the race.

UCI WorldTeams

- AG2R La Mondiale
- Astana
- Bahrain–McLaren
- Bora–Hansgrohe
- CCC Team
- Cofidis
- Deceuninck–Quick-Step
- EF Pro Cycling
- Groupama–FDJ
- Israel Start-Up Nation
- Lotto–Soudal
- Mitchelton–Scott
- Movistar Team
- NTT Pro Cycling
- INEOS Grenadiers
- Team Jumbo–Visma
- Team Sunweb
- Trek–Segafredo
- UAE Team Emirates

UCI ProTeams

- Androni Giocattoli–Sidermec
- Arkéa–Samsic
- Bardiani–CSF–Faizanè
- Gazprom–RusVelo
- Total Direct Énergie
- Vini Zabù–KTM

== Route ==
Stage characteristics and winners
Stage	Date	Route	Distance	Type	Winner
1	7 September	Lido di Camaiore to Lido di Camaiore	133 km (83 mi)	Flat stage	Pascal Ackermann (GER)
2	8 September	Camaiore to Follonica	201 km (125 mi)	Flat stage	Pascal Ackermann (GER)
3	9 September	Follonica to Saturnia	217 km (135 mi)	Hilly stage	Michael Woods (CAN)
4	10 September	Terni to Cascia	194 km (121 mi)	Mountain stage	Lucas Hamilton (AUS)
5	11 September	Norcia to Sassotetto	202 km (126 mi)	Mountain stage	Simon Yates (GBR)
6	12 September	Castelfidardo to Senigallia	171 km (106 mi)	Flat stage	Tim Merlier (BEL)
7	13 September	Pieve Torina to Loreto	181 km (112 mi)	Hilly stage	Mathieu van der Poel (NED)
8	14 September	San Benedetto del Tronto to San Benedetto del Tronto	10.05 km (6.24 mi)	Individual time trial	Filippo Ganna (ITA)
Total		1,309.05 km (813.41 mi)			

== Stages ==
=== Stage 1 ===
7 September 2020 — Lido di Camaiore to Lido di Camaiore, 133 km (83 mi)

Stage 1 Result
Rank	Rider	Team	Time
1	Pascal Ackermann (GER)	Bora–Hansgrohe	2h 57' 55"
2	Fernando Gaviria (COL)	UAE Team Emirates	+ 0"
3	Magnus Cort (DEN)	EF Pro Cycling	+ 0"
4	Szymon Sajnok (POL)	CCC Team	+ 0"
5	Davide Cimolai (ITA)	Israel Start-Up Nation	+ 0"
6	Andrea Vendrame (ITA)	AG2R La Mondiale	+ 0"
7	Jonas Rickaert (BEL)	Alpecin–Fenix	+ 0"
8	Romain Seigle (FRA)	Groupama–FDJ	+ 0"
9	Piet Allegaert (BEL)	Cofidis	+ 0"
10	Pascal Eenkhoorn (NED)	Team Jumbo–Visma	+ 0"

General classification after Stage 1
Rank	Rider	Team	Time
1	Pascal Ackermann (GER)	Bora–Hansgrohe	2h 57' 45"
2	Fernando Gaviria (COL)	UAE Team Emirates	+ 4"
3	Magnus Cort (DEN)	EF Pro Cycling	+ 6"
4	Paul Martens (GER)	Team Jumbo–Visma	+ 7"
5	Simon Pellaud (SUI)	Androni Giocattoli–Sidermec	+ 8"
6	Michael Matthews (AUS)	Team Sunweb	+ 9"
7	Szymon Sajnok (POL)	CCC Team	+ 10"
8	Davide Cimolai (ITA)	Israel Start-Up Nation	+ 10"
9	Andrea Vendrame (ITA)	AG2R La Mondiale	+ 10"
10	Jonas Rickaert (BEL)	Alpecin–Fenix	+ 10"

=== Stage 2 ===
8 September 2020 — Camaiore to Follonica, 201 km (125 mi)

Stage 2 Result
Rank	Rider	Team	Time
1	Pascal Ackermann (GER)	Bora–Hansgrohe	5h 01' 53"
2	Fernando Gaviria (COL)	UAE Team Emirates	+ 0"
3	Rick Zabel (GER)	Israel Start-Up Nation	+ 0"
4	Davide Ballerini (ITA)	Deceuninck–Quick-Step	+ 0"
5	Tim Merlier (BEL)	Alpecin–Fenix	+ 0"
6	Davide Cimolai (ITA)	Israel Start-Up Nation	+ 0"
7	Lorrenzo Manzin (FRA)	Total Direct Énergie	+ 0"
8	Luca Pacioni (ITA)	Androni Giocattoli–Sidermec	+ 0"
9	Florian Vermeersch (BEL)	Lotto–Soudal	+ 0"
10	Mike Teunissen (NED)	Team Jumbo–Visma	+ 0"

General classification after Stage 2
Rank	Rider	Team	Time
1	Pascal Ackermann (GER)	Bora–Hansgrohe	7h 59' 28"
2	Fernando Gaviria (COL)	UAE Team Emirates	+ 8"
3	Magnus Cort (DEN)	EF Pro Cycling	+ 16"
4	Rick Zabel (GER)	Israel Start-Up Nation	+ 16"
5	Nicola Bagioli (ITA)	Androni Giocattoli–Sidermec	+ 17"
6	Paul Martens (GER)	Team Jumbo–Visma	+ 17"
7	Simon Pellaud (SUI)	Androni Giocattoli–Sidermec	+ 18"
8	Michael Matthews (AUS)	Team Sunweb	+ 19"
9	Davide Cimolai (ITA)	Israel Start-Up Nation	+ 20"
10	Lorrenzo Manzin (FRA)	Total Direct Énergie	+ 20"

=== Stage 3 ===
9 September 2020 — Follonica to Saturnia, 217 km (135 mi)

Stage 3 Result
Rank	Rider	Team	Time
1	Michael Woods (CAN)	EF Pro Cycling	5h 19' 46"
2	Rafał Majka (POL)	Bora–Hansgrohe	+ 1"
3	Wilco Kelderman (NED)	Team Sunweb	+ 20"
4	Patrick Konrad (AUT)	Bora–Hansgrohe	+ 20"
5	Aleksandr Vlasov (RUS)	Astana	+ 20"
6	Sergio Henao (COL)	UAE Team Emirates	+ 20"
7	Tanel Kangert (EST)	EF Pro Cycling	+ 20"
8	Fausto Masnada (ITA)	Deceuninck–Quick-Step	+ 20"
9	Jakob Fuglsang (DEN)	Astana	+ 20"
10	Geraint Thomas (GBR)	INEOS Grenadiers	+ 20"

General classification after Stage 3
Rank	Rider	Team	Time
1	Michael Woods (CAN)	EF Pro Cycling	13h 19' 24"
2	Rafał Majka (POL)	Bora–Hansgrohe	+ 5"
3	Wilco Kelderman (NED)	Team Sunweb	+ 26"
4	Geraint Thomas (GBR)	INEOS Grenadiers	+ 30"
5	Patrick Konrad (AUT)	Bora–Hansgrohe	+ 30"
6	Sergio Henao (COL)	UAE Team Emirates	+ 30"
7	Fausto Masnada (ITA)	Deceuninck–Quick-Step	+ 30"
8	Tanel Kangert (EST)	EF Pro Cycling	+ 30"
9	Simon Yates (GBR)	Mitchelton–Scott	+ 30"
10	Aleksandr Vlasov (RUS)	Astana	+ 30"

=== Stage 4 ===
10 September 2020 — Terni to Cascia, 194 km (121 mi)

Stage 4 Result
Rank	Rider	Team	Time
1	Lucas Hamilton (AUS)	Mitchelton–Scott	4h 46' 22"
2	Fausto Masnada (ITA)	Deceuninck–Quick-Step	+ 0"
3	Michael Woods (CAN)	EF Pro Cycling	+ 10"
4	Aleksandr Vlasov (RUS)	Astana	+ 10"
5	Geraint Thomas (GBR)	INEOS Grenadiers	+ 10"
6	Wilco Kelderman (NED)	Team Sunweb	+ 10"
7	Jack Haig (AUS)	Mitchelton–Scott	+ 10"
8	Rafał Majka (POL)	Bora–Hansgrohe	+ 10"
9	James Knox (GBR)	Deceuninck–Quick-Step	+ 10"
10	Simon Yates (GBR)	Mitchelton–Scott	+ 10"

General classification after Stage 4
Rank	Rider	Team	Time
1	Michael Woods (CAN)	EF Pro Cycling	18h 05' 52"
2	Rafał Majka (POL)	Bora–Hansgrohe	+ 9"
3	Fausto Masnada (ITA)	Deceuninck–Quick-Step	+ 18"
4	Lucas Hamilton (AUS)	Mitchelton–Scott	+ 27"
5	Wilco Kelderman (NED)	Team Sunweb	+ 30"
6	Geraint Thomas (GBR)	INEOS Grenadiers	+ 34"
7	Simon Yates (GBR)	Mitchelton–Scott	+ 34"
8	Aleksandr Vlasov (RUS)	Astana	+ 34"
9	Jack Haig (AUS)	Mitchelton–Scott	+ 47"
10	James Knox (GBR)	Deceuninck–Quick-Step	+ 47"

=== Stage 5 ===
11 September 2020 — Norcia to Sassotetto, 202 km (126 mi)

Stage 5 Result
Rank	Rider	Team	Time
1	Simon Yates (GBR)	Mitchelton–Scott	5h 30' 43"
2	Geraint Thomas (GBR)	INEOS Grenadiers	+ 35"
3	Rafał Majka (POL)	Bora–Hansgrohe	+ 35"
4	Aleksandr Vlasov (RUS)	Astana	+ 39"
5	Wilco Kelderman (NED)	Team Sunweb	+ 54"
6	James Knox (GBR)	Deceuninck–Quick-Step	+ 58"
7	Fausto Masnada (ITA)	Deceuninck–Quick-Step	+ 1' 00"
8	Jai Hindley (AUS)	Team Sunweb	+ 1' 05"
9	Gianluca Brambilla (ITA)	Trek–Segafredo	+ 1' 11"
10	Louis Meintjes (RSA)	NTT Pro Cycling	+ 1' 46"

General classification after Stage 5
Rank	Rider	Team	Time
1	Simon Yates (GBR)	Mitchelton–Scott	23h 36' 59"
2	Rafał Majka (POL)	Bora–Hansgrohe	+ 16"
3	Geraint Thomas (GBR)	INEOS Grenadiers	+ 39"
4	Aleksandr Vlasov (RUS)	Astana	+ 49"
5	Fausto Masnada (ITA)	Deceuninck–Quick-Step	+ 54"
6	Wilco Kelderman (NED)	Team Sunweb	+ 1' 00"
7	James Knox (GBR)	Deceuninck–Quick-Step	+ 1' 21"
8	Michael Woods (CAN)	EF Pro Cycling	+ 1' 22"
9	Gianluca Brambilla (ITA)	Trek–Segafredo	+ 2' 28"
10	Jack Haig (AUS)	Mitchelton–Scott	+ 2' 44"

=== Stage 6 ===
12 September 2020 — Castelfidardo to Senigallia, 175 km (109 mi)

Stage 6 Result
Rank	Rider	Team	Time
1	Tim Merlier (BEL)	Alpecin–Fenix	3h 59' 30"
2	Pascal Ackermann (GER)	Bora–Hansgrohe	+ 0"
3	Magnus Cort (DEN)	EF Pro Cycling	+ 0"
4	Fernando Gaviria (COL)	UAE Team Emirates	+ 0"
5	Mike Teunissen (NED)	Team Jumbo–Visma	+ 0"
6	Davide Ballerini (ITA)	Deceuninck–Quick-Step	+ 0"
7	Lorrenzo Manzin (FRA)	B&B Hotels–Vital Concept	+ 0"
8	Piet Allegaert (BEL)	Cofidis	+ 0"
9	Iván García (ESP)	Bahrain–McLaren	+ 0"
10	Alex Aranburu (ESP)	Astana	+ 0"

General classification after Stage 6
Rank	Rider	Team	Time
1	Simon Yates (GBR)	Mitchelton–Scott	27h 36' 29"
2	Rafał Majka (POL)	Bora–Hansgrohe	+ 16"
3	Geraint Thomas (GBR)	INEOS Grenadiers	+ 39"
4	Aleksandr Vlasov (RUS)	Astana	+ 49"
5	Fausto Masnada (ITA)	Deceuninck–Quick-Step	+ 54"
6	Wilco Kelderman (NED)	Team Sunweb	+ 1' 00"
7	James Knox (GBR)	Deceuninck–Quick-Step	+ 1' 21"
8	Michael Woods (CAN)	EF Pro Cycling	+ 1' 22"
9	Gianluca Brambilla (ITA)	Trek–Segafredo	+ 2' 28"
10	Jack Haig (AUS)	Mitchelton–Scott	+ 2' 44"

=== Stage 7 ===
13 September 2020 — Pieve Torina to Loreto, 181 km (112 mi)

Stage 7 Result
Rank	Rider	Team	Time
1	Mathieu van der Poel (NED)	Alpecin–Fenix	4h 19' 23"
2	Ruben Guerreiro (POR)	EF Pro Cycling	+ 4"
3	Matteo Fabbro (ITA)	Bora–Hansgrohe	+ 4"
4	Wilco Kelderman (NED)	Team Sunweb	+ 9"
5	Alex Aranburu (ESP)	Astana	+ 10"
6	Simon Yates (GBR)	Mitchelton–Scott	+ 10"
7	Michael Woods (CAN)	EF Pro Cycling	+ 10"
8	Geraint Thomas (GBR)	INEOS Grenadiers	+ 10"
9	Aleksandr Vlasov (RUS)	Astana	+ 10"
10	Rafał Majka (POL)	Bora–Hansgrohe	+ 10"

General classification after Stage 7
Rank	Rider	Team	Time
1	Simon Yates (GBR)	Mitchelton–Scott	31h 56' 02"
2	Rafał Majka (POL)	Bora–Hansgrohe	+ 16"
3	Geraint Thomas (GBR)	INEOS Grenadiers	+ 39"
4	Aleksandr Vlasov (RUS)	Astana	+ 49"
5	Fausto Masnada (ITA)	Deceuninck–Quick-Step	+ 57"
6	Wilco Kelderman (NED)	Team Sunweb	+ 59"
7	Michael Woods (CAN)	EF Pro Cycling	+ 1' 22"
8	James Knox (GBR)	Deceuninck–Quick-Step	+ 1' 26"
9	Gianluca Brambilla (ITA)	Trek–Segafredo	+ 2' 33"
10	Jack Haig (AUS)	Mitchelton–Scott	+ 2' 47"

=== Stage 8 ===
14 September 2020 — San Benedetto del Tronto to San Benedetto del Tronto, 10.05 km (6.24 mi), individual time trial (ITT)

Stage 8 Result
Rank	Rider	Team	Time
1	Filippo Ganna (ITA)	INEOS Grenadiers	10' 42"
2	Victor Campenaerts (BEL)	NTT Pro Cycling	+ 20"
3	Rohan Dennis (AUS)	INEOS Grenadiers	+ 26"
4	Geraint Thomas (GBR)	INEOS Grenadiers	+ 28"
5	Tobias Ludvigsson (SWE)	Groupama–FDJ	+ 33"
6	Benjamin Thomas (FRA)	Groupama–FDJ	+ 34"
7	Jos van Emden (NED)	Team Jumbo–Visma	+ 39"
8	Nathan Van Hooydonck (BEL)	CCC Team	+ 40"
9	Jan Tratnik (SLO)	Bahrain–McLaren	+ 40"
10	Michael Matthews (AUS)	Team Sunweb	+ 42"

General classification after Stage 8
Rank	Rider	Team	Time
1	Simon Yates (GBR)	Mitchelton–Scott	32h 07' 34"
2	Geraint Thomas (GBR)	INEOS Grenadiers	+ 17"
3	Rafał Majka (POL)	Bora–Hansgrohe	+ 29"
4	Wilco Kelderman (NED)	Team Sunweb	+ 56"
5	Aleksandr Vlasov (RUS)	Astana	+ 58"
6	Fausto Masnada (ITA)	Deceuninck–Quick-Step	+ 1' 18"
7	James Knox (GBR)	Deceuninck–Quick-Step	+ 1' 41"
8	Michael Woods (CAN)	EF Pro Cycling	+ 2' 12"
9	Gianluca Brambilla (ITA)	Trek–Segafredo	+ 3' 02"
10	Jack Haig (AUS)	Mitchelton–Scott	+ 3' 10"

== Classification leadership table ==
Stage	Winner	General classification	Points classification	Mountains classification	Young rider classification	Teams classification
1	Pascal Ackermann	Pascal Ackermann	Pascal Ackermann	Nathan Haas	Szymon Sajnok	Bora–Hansgrohe
2	Pascal Ackermann	Pascal Ackermann	Pascal Ackermann	Nathan Haas	Nicola Bagioli	Bora–Hansgrohe
3	Michael Woods	Michael Woods	Pascal Ackermann	Nathan Haas	Aleksandr Vlasov	EF Pro Cycling
4	Lucas Hamilton	Michael Woods	Pascal Ackermann	Michael Woods	Lucas Hamilton	Mitchelton–Scott
5	Simon Yates	Simon Yates	Pascal Ackermann	Héctor Carretero	Aleksandr Vlasov	Astana
6	Tim Merlier	Simon Yates	Pascal Ackermann	Héctor Carretero	Aleksandr Vlasov	Astana
7	Mathieu van der Poel	Simon Yates	Pascal Ackermann	Héctor Carretero	Aleksandr Vlasov	Team Sunweb
8	Filippo Ganna	Simon Yates	Pascal Ackermann	Héctor Carretero	Aleksandr Vlasov	Team Sunweb
Final		Simon Yates	Pascal Ackermann	Héctor Carretero	Aleksandr Vlasov	Team Sunweb

== Final classification standings ==
Legend
Denotes the winner of the general classification	Denotes the winner of the mountains classification
Denotes the winner of the points classification	Denotes the winner of the young rider classification

=== General classification ===
Final general classification (1–10)
Rank	Rider	Team	Time
1	Simon Yates (GBR)	Mitchelton–Scott	32h 07' 34"
2	Geraint Thomas (GBR)	INEOS Grenadiers	+ 17"
3	Rafał Majka (POL)	Bora–Hansgrohe	+ 29"
4	Wilco Kelderman (NED)	Team Sunweb	+ 56"
5	Aleksandr Vlasov (RUS)	Astana	+ 58"
6	Fausto Masnada (ITA)	Deceuninck–Quick-Step	+ 1' 18"
7	James Knox (GBR)	Deceuninck–Quick-Step	+ 1' 41"
8	Michael Woods (CAN)	EF Pro Cycling	+ 2' 12"
9	Gianluca Brambilla (ITA)	Trek–Segafredo	+ 3' 02"
10	Jack Haig (AUS)	Mitchelton–Scott	+ 3' 10"

=== Points classification ===
Final points classification (1–10)
Rank	Rider	Team	Points
1	Pascal Ackermann (GER)	Bora–Hansgrohe	34
2	Geraint Thomas (GBR)	INEOS Grenadiers	27
3	Fernando Gaviria (COL)	UAE Team Emirates	27
4	Wilco Kelderman (NED)	Team Sunweb	26
5	Michael Woods (CAN)	EF Pro Cycling	24
6	Rafał Majka (POL)	Bora–Hansgrohe	22
7	Aleksandr Vlasov (RUS)	Astana	22
8	Simon Yates (GBR)	Mitchelton–Scott	18
9	Tim Merlier (BEL)	Alpecin–Fenix	18
10	Fausto Masnada (ITA)	Deceuninck–Quick-Step	17

=== Mountains classification ===
Final mountains classification (1–10)
Rank	Rider	Team	Points
1	Héctor Carretero (ESP)	Movistar Team	31
2	Simon Yates (GBR)	Mitchelton–Scott	25
3	Michael Woods (CAN)	EF Pro Cycling	20
4	Michael Matthews (AUS)	Team Sunweb	15
5	Aleksandr Vlasov (RUS)	Astana	15
6	Mathias Frank (SUI)	AG2R La Mondiale	14
7	Geraint Thomas (GBR)	INEOS Grenadiers	13
8	Carl Fredrik Hagen (NOR)	Lotto–Soudal	13
9	Rafał Majka (POL)	Bora–Hansgrohe	12
10	Dries De Bondt (BEL)	Alpecin–Fenix	11

=== Young rider classification ===
Final young rider classification (1–10)
Rank	Rider	Team	Time
1	Aleksandr Vlasov (RUS)	Astana	32h 08' 32"
2	James Knox (GBR)	Deceuninck–Quick-Step	+ 43"
3	Sam Oomen (NED)	Team Sunweb	+ 2' 13"
4	Jai Hindley (AUS)	Team Sunweb	+ 2' 47"
5	Denis Nekrasov (RUS)	Gazprom–RusVelo	+ 7' 30"
6	Jaakko Hänninen (FIN)	AG2R La Mondiale	+ 8' 22"
7	Matteo Fabbro (ITA)	Bora–Hansgrohe	+ 13' 33"
8	Tao Geoghegan Hart (GBR)	INEOS Grenadiers	+ 13' 33"
9	Óscar Rodríguez (ESP)	Astana	+ 13' 43"
10	Lucas Hamilton (AUS)	Mitchelton–Scott	+ 14' 22"

=== Teams classification ===
Final teams classification (1–10)
Rank	Team	Time
1	Team Sunweb	96h 29' 59"
2	Astana	+ 46"
3	EF Pro Cycling	+ 8' 44"
4	Mitchelton–Scott	+ 10' 44"
5	AG2R La Mondiale	+ 16' 15"
6	Bora–Hansgrohe	+ 21' 55"
7	Trek–Segafredo	+ 23' 29"
8	CCC Team	+ 27' 15"
9	Groupama–FDJ	+ 29' 06"
10	INEOS Grenadiers	+ 33' 50"
