= Alberto Dainese =

Italian cyclist (born 1998)

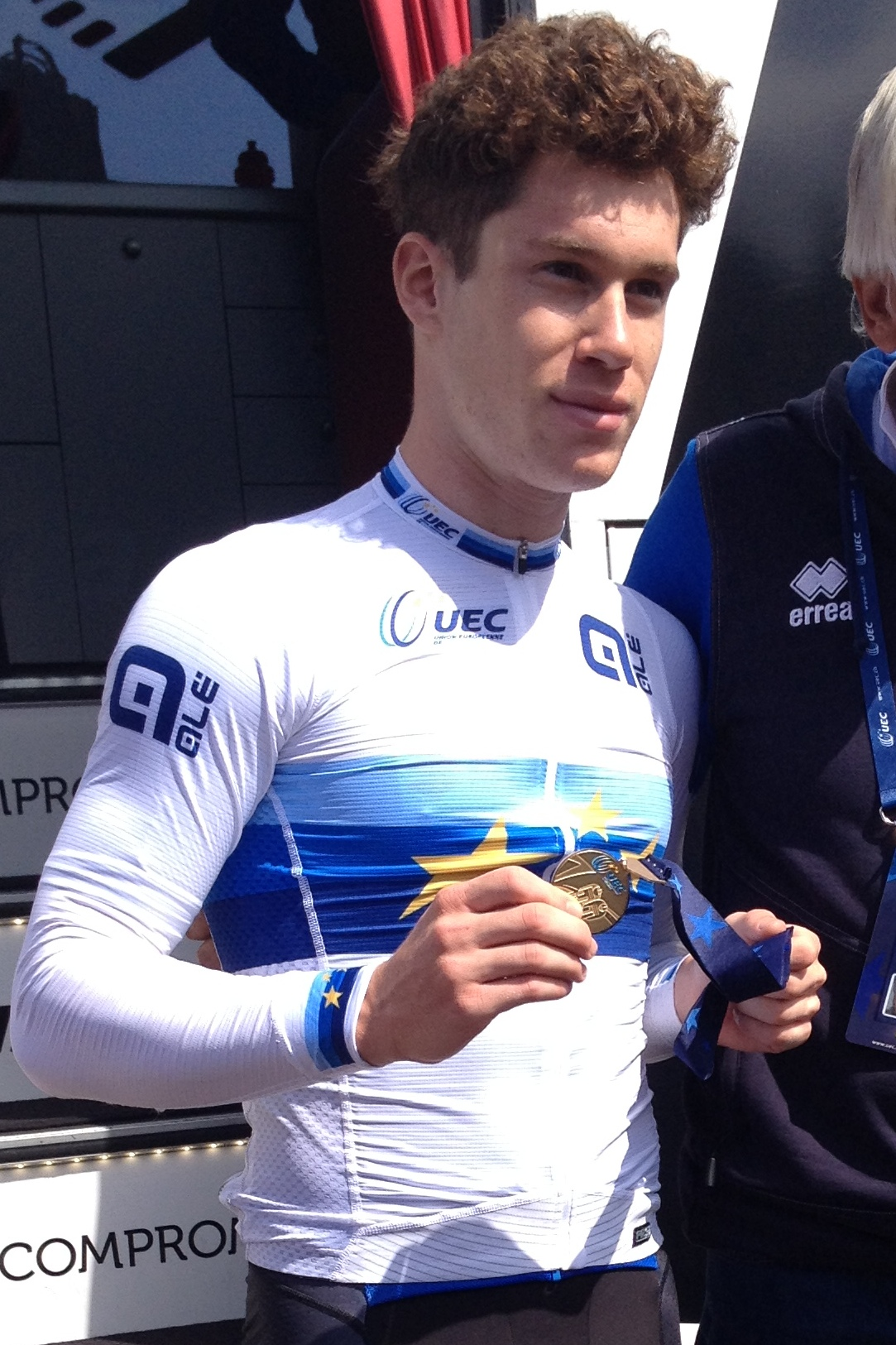
- Dainese in 2019

Personal information
- Full name: Alberto Vittorio Adolfo Dainese
- Born: 25 March 1998 (age 28) Abano Terme, Italy
- Height: 1.77 m (5 ft 10 in)
- Weight: 72 kg (159 lb)

Cycling career
- Sport: Cycling
- Current team: Soudal–Quick-Step
- Discipline: Road
- Role: Rider
- Rider type: Sprinter

Amateur teams
- 2017: General Store Bottoli Zardini
- 2018: Zalf–Euromobil–Désirée–Fior

Professional teams
- 2018–2019: SEG Racing Academy
- 2020–2023: Team Sunweb
- 2024–2025: Tudor Pro Cycling Team
- 2026–: Soudal–Quick-Step

Major wins
- Grand Tours Giro d'Italia 2 individual stages (2022, 2023) Vuelta a España 1 individual stage (2023) 1 TTT stage (2023)
Medal record
Representing Italy
Men's road bicycle racing
European Championships
Gold medal – first place	2019 Alkmaar	Under-23 road race

Alberto Dainese (born 25 March 1998) is an Italian professional cyclist who rides for UCI WorldTeam Soudal–Quick-Step. A sprinter, he has won two stages of the Giro d'Italia; in 2022 and 2023, and a stage of the 2023 Vuelta a España. He was also the 2019 European under-23 Road race champion. Before joining Tudor Pro Cycling Team in 2024, Dainese spent four years with the UCI WorldTeam Team Sunweb.

In August 2025, Dainese returned to the World Tour, signing with Soudal–Quick-Step ahead of the 2026 season.

== Major results ==
2016
1st Stage 3 Giro di Basilicata
2018
1st Trofeo Città di San Vendemiano
Giro della Regione Friuli Venezia Giulia

1st Points classification
1st Stage 1

1st Stage 9 Giro Ciclistico d'Italia
2nd Road race, National Under-23 Road Championships
6th Gooikse Pijl
10th Gran Premio Industrie del Marmo
2019 (1 pro win)
1st Road race, UEC European Under-23 Road Championships
1st Entre Brenne et Montmorillonnais
Tour de Normandie

1st Points classification
1st Stage 2

1st Stage 3 Czech Cycling Tour
2nd Gooikse Pijl
4th L'Etoile d'Or
5th Arno Wallaard Memorial
6th Overall Paris–Arras Tour
6th Coppa Bernocchi
6th Schaal Sels
7th Overall Tour de Bretagne

1st Stages 2, 3 & 6

2020 (1)
1st Stage 1 Herald Sun Tour
3rd Race Torquay
2021
2nd Paris–Chauny
3rd Grand Prix d'Isbergues
3rd Giro del Veneto
5th Omloop van het Houtland
2022 (1)
1st Stage 11 Giro d'Italia
5th Circuit Franco-Belge
2023 (3)
Vuelta a España

1st Stages 1 (TTT) & 19

1st Stage 17 Giro d'Italia
1st Stage 1 Arctic Race of Norway
4th Le Samyn
2024 (1)
1st Stage 3 Région Pays de la Loire Tour
2nd Trofeo Ses Salines-Felanitx
6th Trofeo Palma
9th Overall Région Pays de la Loire Tour
2025
3rd Classique Dunkerque
7th Clásica de Almería
8th Nokere Koerse
8th Münsterland Giro
10th Trofeo Palma
10th Omloop van het Houtland

=== Grand Tour general classification results timeline ===
Grand Tour	2021	2022	2023	2024	2025
Giro d'Italia	—	122	124	116	—
Tour de France	—	100	—	—	119
Vuelta a España	129	—	144	—	—

Legend
—	Did not compete
DNF	Did not finish
