= James Whelan (cyclist) =

Australian bicycle racer

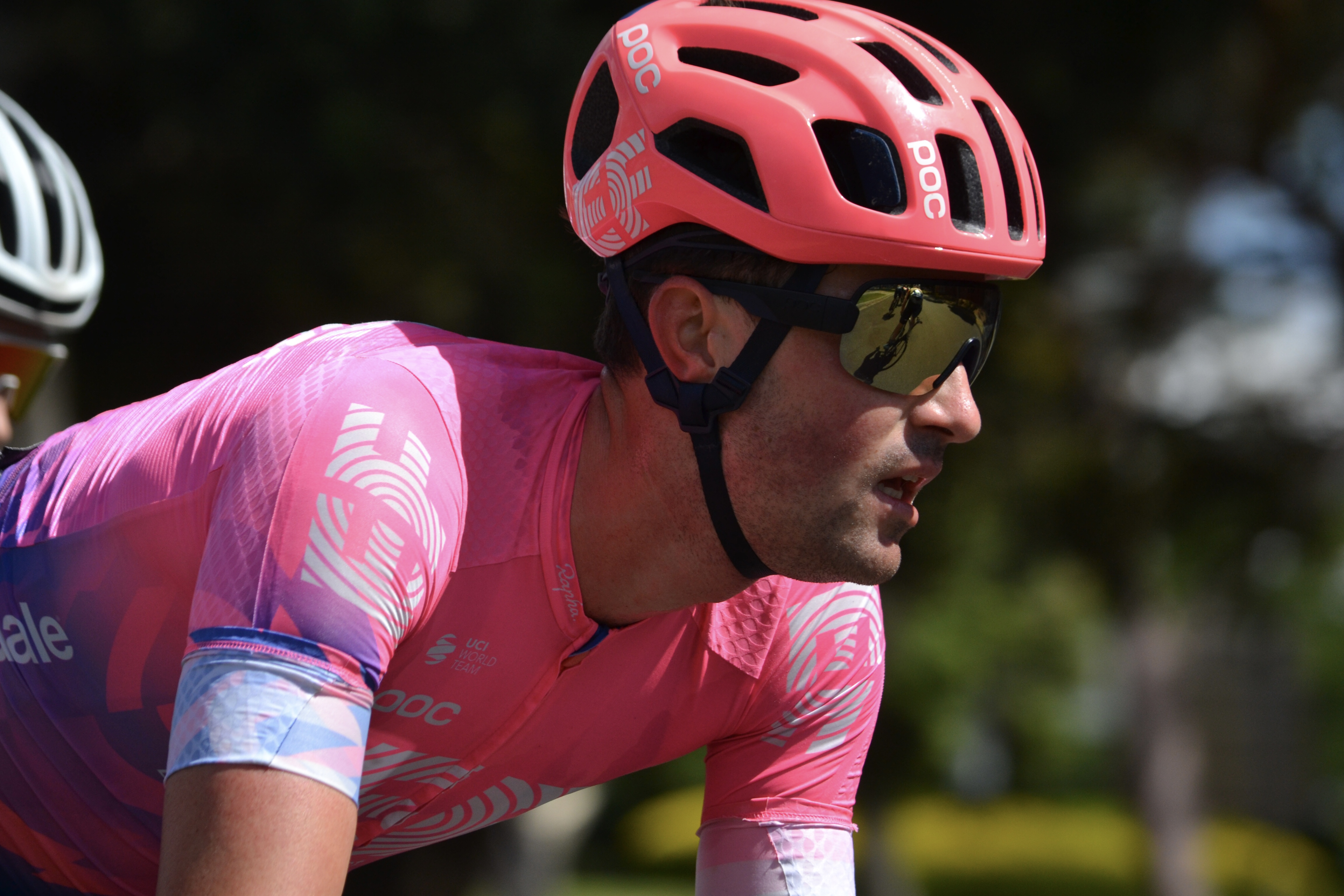

Personal information
- Born: 11 July 1996 (age 30) Melbourne, Victoria, Australia
- Height: 1.85 m (6 ft 1 in)
- Weight: 64 kg (141 lb)

Cycling career
- Sport: Cycling
- Discipline: Road
- Role: Rider

Amateur team
- 2017: InForm MAKE

Professional teams
- 2018: Drapac–EF p/b Cannondale Holistic Development Team
- 2018: EF Education First–Drapac p/b Cannondale (stagiaire)
- 2019–2021: EF Education First
- 2022–2023: Team BridgeLane
- 2023: Glassdrive–Q8–Anicolor
- 2024: Q36.5 Pro Cycling Team

James Whelan (born 11 July 1996) is an Australian long-distance runner, and former road racing cyclist, who competed as a professional from 2018 to 2024.

== Professional cycling career (2018–2024) ==
In April 2018, Whelan won the Tour of Flanders U23, which was his first cycling race in Europe.

In October 2020, he was named in the startlist for the 2020 Giro d'Italia, racing for American team EF Pro Cycling. He finished in 75th place overall.

== Professional running career (2026–present) ==
In 2026, Whelan signed a professional running deal with Salomon. He made his marathon debut at the 2026 Melbourne Marathon, finishing 5th overall with a time of 2:17:03. Notably, he ran alongside eventual winner and former marathon world record holder Eliud Kipchoge for the first 30 kilometres of the race.

== Major results (cycling) ==
2017
3rd Overall Tour of Tasmania
2018
1st Road race, Oceania Under–23 Road Championships
1st Ronde van Vlaanderen Beloften
2nd Road race, Oceania Road Championships
2nd Road race, National Under–23 Road Championships
2022
1st Overall Santos Festival of Cycling

1st Stage 1

2nd Road race, National Road Championships
2023
5th GP Internacional Torres Vedras - Trofeu Joaquim Agostinho
8th Overall Volta a Portugal

1st Stage 9

=== Grand Tour general classification results timeline ===
Grand Tour	2020
Giro d'Italia	105
Tour de France	—
Vuelta a España	—

Legend
—	Did not compete
DNF	Did not finish
