= Nero Continental =

Australian cycling team

Team information
- UCI code: NER
- Registered: Australia
- Founded: 2016
- Disbanded: ~2022
- Discipline: Road
- Status: UCI Continental

Key personnel
- General manager: Luke Manion
- Team manager: Kiichi Yamada

Team name history
- 2016–2017 2018 2019 2020–2022: Nero Racing; Nero–KOM Financial Advice Racing; Nero Bianchi; Nero Continental

Nero Continental was a UCI Continental cycling team which was founded in Australia in 2016.

The team was based in the Sydney suburb of Balmain. The sports director was Luke Manion and the owner in 2018 was listed as veteran cyclist Chris Miller. It last competed in about 2022.

== Team roster ==
As of 21 February 2021.

Rider	Date of birth
Iven Bennett (AUS)	6 April 1997 (age 29)
Ben Carman (AUS)	22 June 1995 (age 31)
Jesse Coyle (AUS)	12 July 1994 (age 32)
Jonathan Farley (AUS)	17 May 2002 (age 24)
Dylan McKenna (AUS)	18 June 1998 (age 28)

Rider	Date of birth
Chris Miller (AUS)	25 June 1981 (age 45)
Leigh Phillips (AUS)	12 November 1997 (age 28)
Cooper Sayers (AUS)	25 February 1999 (age 27)
Myles Stewart (AUS)	9 July 1999 (age 27)
Leo Yip (HKG)	2 June 1998 (age 28)

== Major wins ==
2019
Overall Tour of the Tropics, Jay Vine

Stage 1, Samuel Hill
Stage 3, Jay Vine

Stage 3 Tour de Filipinas, Samuel Hill
Stage 4 Tour de Filipinas, Jesse Coyle
Tour Great South Coast

Stage 2, Rylee Field
Stage 6, Jesse Coyle

Modesto, Samuel Hill
2020
Stage 1 National Tour NRS, Jay Vine
