= Jai Hindley =

Australian cyclist (born 1996)

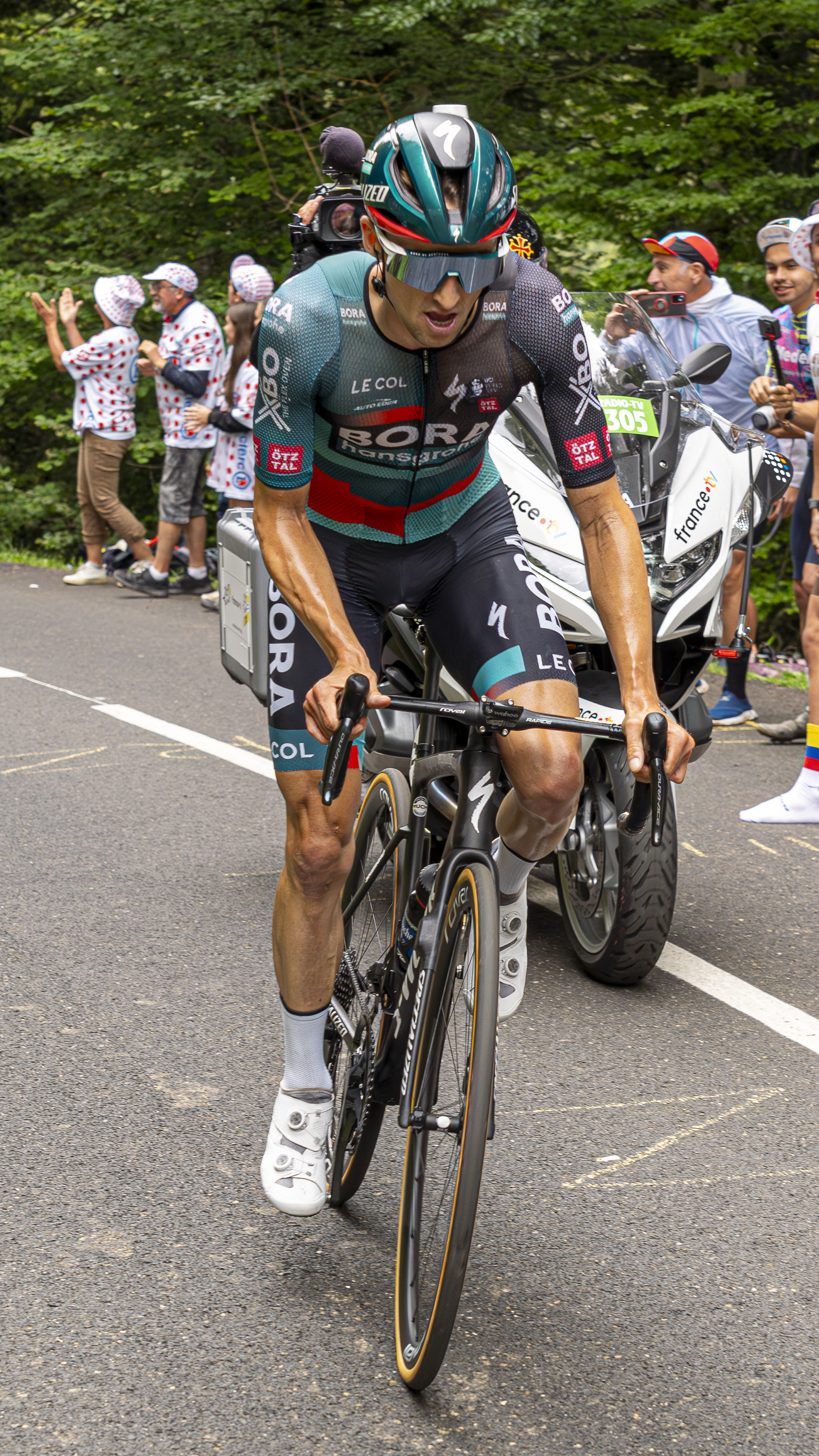
- Hindley at the 2023 Tour de France

Personal information
- Born: 5 May 1996 (age 30) Perth, Western Australia, Australia
- Height: 1.75 m (5 ft 9 in)
- Weight: 60 kg (130 lb; 9 st 6 lb)

Cycling career
- Sport: Cycling
- Current team: Red Bull–Bora–Hansgrohe
- Discipline: Road
- Role: Rider
- Rider type: Climber

Professional teams
- 2016: Attaque Team Gusto
- 2017: Mitchelton Scott
- 2018–2021: Team Sunweb
- 2022–: Bora–Hansgrohe

Major wins
- Grand Tours Tour de France 1 individual stage (2023) Giro d'Italia General classification (2022) 2 individual stages (2020, 2022)

Jai Hindley (born 5 May 1996) is an Australian professional cyclist who rides for UCI WorldTeam Red Bull–Bora–Hansgrohe. Hindley is primarily a climber, notable for winning the 2022 Giro d'Italia. He was the first Australian to win the general classification, and only the second Australian to win a Grand Tour after Cadel Evans. Hindley has also finished top 10 in the Tour de France and Vuelta a España.

== Career ==
=== Sunweb (2018–2021) ===
After joining the team for the 2018 season, Hindley made his debut for Team Sunweb at the 2018 Volta ao Algarve. In August 2018, he was named in the startlist for the Vuelta a España. In May 2019, he was named in the startlist for the 2019 Giro d'Italia.

Hindley started the 2020 season well by winning two stages and the general classification in the Herald Sun Tour in February. He started the Giro d'Italia in October. He moved up to third place on the general classification after finishing third on Stage 15. He won stage 18 which was considered the "Queen stage" crossing the Stelvio Pass. He moved up to second place overall after the stage and also took the lead in the young riders classification. He finished second to Tao Geoghegan Hart on the mountainous stage 20 to move into the overall lead with the same time as Geoghegan Hart. The final stage of the Giro was a 15.7 kilometre time trial. Hindley finished with a time 39 seconds slower than Geoghegan Hart, which meant Hindley finished the Giro in second place overall.

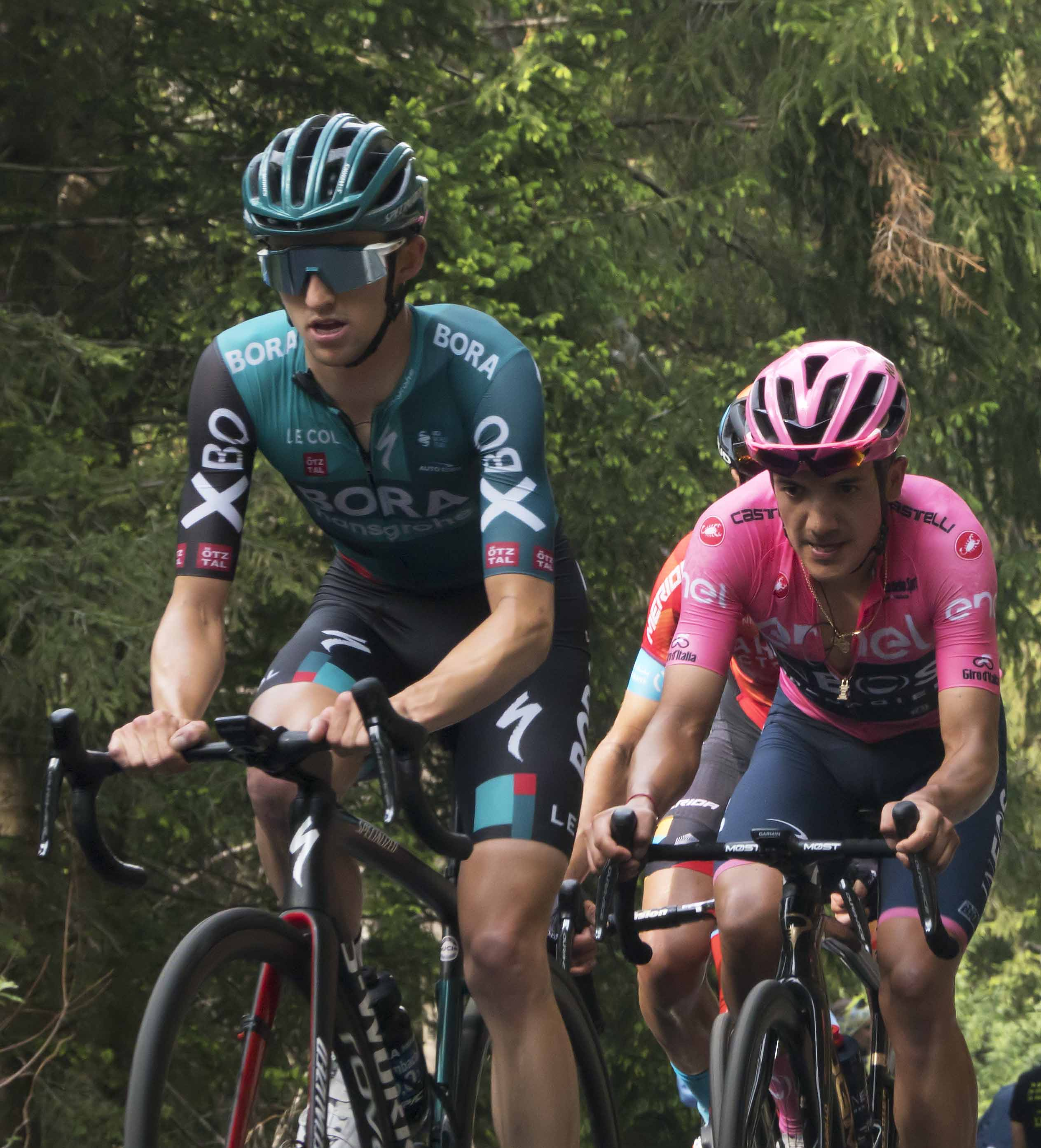
Hindley (left) at the 2022 Giro d'Italia

Hindley withdrew from the 2021 Giro d'Italia prior to the start of stage 14. At the time he was in 25th place more than 17 minutes off the lead.

=== Bora (2022–present) ===
Hindley moved to the Bora–Hansgrohe team for the 2022 season. Early in the season he managed a top 5 finish in the 2022 Tirreno–Adriatico. Two months later he won his first Grand Tour, the Giro d'Italia. Hindley rode strongly during the first two weeks of the race and won stage 9, a high mountain stage. For the majority of the third week he stood in 2nd place, just a few seconds behind Richard Carapaz. On the penultimate mountain stage dropped all of the GC contenders including Carapaz and ride himself into the lead with a comfortable margin going into the final ITT. For the second time in his career he rode the final ITT of the Giro d'Italia while wearing the Maglia Rosa, but this time he seized the moment and won the race. He is the first Australian to win the Giro and just the second Australian to win a grand tour, following Cadel Evans who won the Tour de France. Later in the season he rode in the 2022 Vuelta.

On 5 July 2023, Hindley won Stage 5 of the Tour de France by 32 seconds. His lead at the finish line put him in first place in the General Classification earning him the Yellow Jersey for the start of Stage 6. He finished the Tour in seventh place overall.

Hindley was forced to abandon the 2025 Giro d'Italia on 15 May 2025, after being injured in a crash in the peloton.

== Major results ==
2013
Oceania Junior Road Championships

2nd Road race
10th Time trial

2014
3rd Road race, Oceania Junior Road Championships
3rd Road race, National Junior Road Championships
2015
10th Time trial, Oceania Under-23 Road Championships
2016
1st GP Capodarco
2nd Overall An Post Rás

1st Young rider classification

2nd Taiwan KOM Challenge
5th Overall Tour de l'Avenir
6th Flèche Ardennaise
2017 (2 pro wins)
1st Overall Toscana-Terra di Ciclismo

1st Mountains classification
1st Stage 1a (TTT)

1st Overall Tour of Fuzhou

1st Stage 4

2nd Overall Herald Sun Tour

1st Young rider classification

2nd Trofeo Città di San Vendemiano
3rd Road race, Oceania Road Championships
3rd Overall Giro Ciclistico d'Italia

1st Stage 7

4th Overall Rhône-Alpes Isère Tour
4th Gran Premio Industrie del Marmo
9th Overall Tour Alsace
10th Overall Tour de l'Avenir
10th Gran Premio Palio del Recioto
2019
2nd Overall Tour de Pologne
2020 (4)
1st Overall Herald Sun Tour

1st Mountains classification
1st Stages 2 & 4

2nd Overall Giro d'Italia

1st Stage 18
Held after Stage 20
Held after Stages 18–20

2021
7th Overall Tour de Pologne
2022 (2)
1st Overall Giro d'Italia

1st Stage 9

5th Overall Tirreno–Adriatico
6th Clásica Jaén Paraíso Interior
7th Overall Vuelta a Burgos
10th Overall Vuelta a España
2023 (1)
4th Overall Critérium du Dauphiné
7th Overall Tour de France

1st Stage 5
Held after Stage 5

8th Overall Volta a Catalunya
2024
3rd Overall Tirreno–Adriatico
5th Overall Volta a la Comunitat Valenciana
10th Grand Prix Cycliste de Montréal
2025
4th Overall Vuelta a España
5th Overall Tirreno–Adriatico
8th Overall Tour of the Alps
9th Overall Volta a la Comunitat Valenciana
2026
3rd Overall Giro d'Italia
6th Memorial Marco Pantani

=== General classification results timeline ===
Grand Tour general classification results
| Grand Tour | 2018 | 2019 | 2020 | 2021 | 2022 | 2023 | 2024 | 2025 | 2026 |
| Giro d'Italia | — | 35 | 2 | DNF | 1 | — | — | DNF | 3 |
| Tour de France | — | — | — | — | — | 7 | 18 | — | 15 |
| Vuelta a España | 32 | — | — | — | 10 | — | — | 4 | — |
Major stage race general classification results
| Stage races | 2018 | 2019 | 2020 | 2021 | 2022 | 2023 | 2024 | 2025 | 2026 |
| Paris–Nice | — | — | — | 18 | — | — | — | — | — |
| Tirreno–Adriatico | — | — | 13 | — | 5 | 15 | 3 | 5 | 22 |
| Volta a Catalunya | 71 | — | NH | DNF | 13 | 8 | — | — | 17 |
| Tour of the Basque Country | — | — | NH | — | — | — | 12 | — | — |
| Tour de Romandie | — | — | NH | — | — | — | 28 | — | — |
| Critérium du Dauphiné | — | — | — | — | — | 4 | 20 | — | — |
| Tour de Suisse | — | — | NH | — | — | — | — | — | — |

Legend
| — | Did not compete |
| DNF | Did not finish |
