= List of teams and cyclists in the 2024 Tour de France =

List of cyclists

The following is a list of teams and cyclists who participated in the 2024 Tour de France.

== Teams ==
UCI WorldTeams

- Alpecin–Deceuninck
- Arkéa–B&B Hotels
- Astana Qazaqstan Team
- Cofidis
- Decathlon–AG2R La Mondiale
- EF Education–EasyPost
- Groupama–FDJ
- INEOS Grenadiers
- Intermarché–Wanty
- Lidl–Trek
- Movistar Team
- Red Bull–Bora–Hansgrohe
- Soudal–Quick-Step
- Team Bahrain Victorious
- Team dsm–firmenich PostNL
- Team Jayco–AlUla
- UAE Team Emirates
- Visma–Lease a Bike

UCI ProTeams

- Israel–Premier Tech
- Lotto–Dstny
- Team TotalEnergies
- Uno-X Mobility

== Cyclists ==
Legend
No.	Starting number worn by the rider during the Tour
Pos.	Position in the general classification
Time	Deficit to the winner of the general classification
‡	Denotes riders born on or after 1 January 1999 eligible for the young rider classification
General classification	Denotes the winner of the general classification
Points classification	Denotes the winner of the points classification
Mountains classification	Denotes the winner of the mountains classification
Young rider classification	Denotes the winner of the young rider classification (eligibility indicated by ‡)
Team classification	Denotes riders that represent the winner of the team classification
	Denotes the winner of the super-combativity award
DNS	Denotes a rider who did not start a stage, followed by the stage before which he withdrew
DNF	Denotes a rider who did not finish a stage, followed by the stage in which he withdrew
DSQ	Denotes a rider who was disqualified from the race, followed by the stage in which this occurred
OTL	Denotes a rider finished outside the time limit, followed by the stage in which they did so
Ages correct as of Saturday 29 June 2024, the date on which the Tour began

=== By starting number ===
No.	Name	Nationality	Team	Age	Pos.	Time	Ref.
1	Jonas Vingegaard	Denmark	Visma–Lease a Bike	27	2	+ 6' 17"	
2	Tiesj Benoot	Belgium	Visma–Lease a Bike	30	49	+ 3h 26' 11"	
3	Matteo Jorgenson ‡	United States	Visma–Lease a Bike	24	8	+ 26' 34"	
4	Wilco Kelderman	Netherlands	Visma–Lease a Bike	33	21	+ 1h 23' 11"	
5	Christophe Laporte	France	Visma–Lease a Bike	31	84	+ 4h 26' 27"	
6	Bart Lemmen	Netherlands	Visma–Lease a Bike	28	70	+ 3h 56' 28"	
7	Jan Tratnik	Slovenia	Visma–Lease a Bike	34	64	+ 3h 48' 34"	
8	Wout van Aert	Belgium	Visma–Lease a Bike	29	52	+ 3h 35' 56"	
11	Tadej Pogačar	Slovenia	UAE Team Emirates	25	1	83h 38' 56"	
12	João Almeida	Portugal	UAE Team Emirates	25	4	+ 19' 03"	
13	Juan Ayuso ‡	Spain	UAE Team Emirates	21	DNF-13	–	
14	Nils Politt	Germany	UAE Team Emirates	30	75	+ 4h 03' 21"	
15	Pavel Sivakov	France	UAE Team Emirates	26	32	+ 2h 14' 21"	
16	Marc Soler	Spain	UAE Team Emirates	30	44	+ 2h 55' 47"	
17	Tim Wellens	Belgium	UAE Team Emirates	33	80	+ 4h 20' 49"	
18	Adam Yates	Great Britain	UAE Team Emirates	31	6	+ 24' 07"	
21	Simon Yates	Great Britain	Team Jayco–AlUla	31	12	+ 39' 04"	
22	Luke Durbridge	Australia	Team Jayco–AlUla	33	123	+ 5h 26' 37"	
23	Dylan Groenewegen	Netherlands	Team Jayco–AlUla	31	135	+ 5h 57' 41"	
24	Chris Harper	Australia	Team Jayco–AlUla	29	DNS-16	–	
25	Christopher Juul-Jensen	Denmark	Team Jayco–AlUla	34	97	+ 4h 45' 12"	
26	Michael Matthews	Australia	Team Jayco–AlUla	33	89	+ 4h 30' 03"	
27	Luka Mezgec	Slovenia	Team Jayco–AlUla	36	116	+ 5h 17' 26"	
28	Elmar Reinders	Netherlands	Team Jayco–AlUla	32	DNS-17	–	
31	Carlos Rodríguez ‡	Spain	INEOS Grenadiers	23	7	+ 25' 04"	
32	Egan Bernal	Colombia	INEOS Grenadiers	27	29	+ 2h 03' 50"	
33	Jonathan Castroviejo	Spain	INEOS Grenadiers	37	53	+ 3h 35' 58"	
34	Laurens De Plus	Belgium	INEOS Grenadiers	28	15	+ 46' 24"	
35	Michał Kwiatkowski	Poland	INEOS Grenadiers	34	54	+ 3h 36' 34"	
36	Thomas Pidcock ‡	Great Britain	INEOS Grenadiers	24	DNS-14	–	
37	Geraint Thomas	Great Britain	INEOS Grenadiers	38	42	+ 2h 47' 36"	
38	Ben Turner ‡	Great Britain	INEOS Grenadiers	25	115	+ 5h 17' 11"	
41	Giulio Ciccone	Italy	Lidl–Trek	29	11	+ 30' 42"	
42	Julien Bernard	France	Lidl–Trek	32	22	+ 1h 37' 15"	
43	Tim Declercq	Belgium	Lidl–Trek	35	DNS-11	–	
44	Ryan Gibbons	South Africa	Lidl–Trek	29	87	+ 4h 28' 44"	
45	Mads Pedersen	Denmark	Lidl–Trek	28	DNS-8	–	
46	Toms Skujiņš	Latvia	Lidl–Trek	33	45	+ 2h 57' 02"	
47	Jasper Stuyven	Belgium	Lidl–Trek	32	61	+ 3h 47' 39"	
48	Carlos Verona	Spain	Lidl–Trek	31	24	+ 1h 47' 13"	
51	Felix Gall	Austria	Decathlon–AG2R La Mondiale	26	14	+ 46' 12"	
52	Bruno Armirail	France	Decathlon–AG2R La Mondiale	30	33	+ 2h 15' 39"	
53	Sam Bennett	Ireland	Decathlon–AG2R La Mondiale	33	DNF-17	–	
54	Dorian Godon	France	Decathlon–AG2R La Mondiale	28	82	+ 4h 23' 27"	
55	Paul Lapeira ‡	France	Decathlon–AG2R La Mondiale	24	88	+ 4h 28' 54"	
56	Oliver Naesen	Belgium	Decathlon–AG2R La Mondiale	33	83	+ 4h 23' 43"	
57	Nans Peters	France	Decathlon–AG2R La Mondiale	30	76	+ 4h 07' 39"	
58	Nicolas Prodhomme	France	Decathlon–AG2R La Mondiale	27	48	+ 3h 19' 25"	
61	Pello Bilbao	Spain	Team Bahrain Victorious	34	DNF-12	–	
62	Nikias Arndt	Germany	Team Bahrain Victorious	32	111	+ 5h 08' 28"	
63	Phil Bauhaus	Germany	Team Bahrain Victorious	29	DNS-17	–	
64	Santiago Buitrago ‡	Colombia	Team Bahrain Victorious	24	10	+ 29' 03"	
65	Jack Haig	Australia	Team Bahrain Victorious	30	31	+ 2h 11' 33"	
66	Matej Mohorič	Slovenia	Team Bahrain Victorious	29	127	+ 5h 33' 22"	
67	Wout Poels	Netherlands	Team Bahrain Victorious	36	43	+ 2h 54' 52"	
68	Fred Wright ‡	Great Britain	Team Bahrain Victorious	25	OTL-11	–	
71	Remco Evenepoel ‡	Belgium	Soudal–Quick-Step	24	3	+ 9' 18"	
72	Jan Hirt	Czechia	Soudal–Quick-Step	33	67	+ 3h 54' 00"	
73	Yves Lampaert	Belgium	Soudal–Quick-Step	33	125	+ 5h 27' 51"	
74	Mikel Landa	Spain	Soudal–Quick-Step	34	5	+ 20' 06"	
75	Gianni Moscon	Italy	Soudal–Quick-Step	30	86	+ 4h 26' 54"	
76	Casper Pedersen	Denmark	Soudal–Quick-Step	28	DNS-4	–	
77	Ilan Van Wilder ‡	Belgium	Soudal–Quick-Step	24	26	+ 1h 54' 30"	
78	Louis Vervaeke	Belgium	Soudal–Quick-Step	30	DNF-14	–	
81	Primož Roglič	Slovenia	Red Bull–Bora–Hansgrohe	34	DNS-13	–	
82	Nico Denz	Germany	Red Bull–Bora–Hansgrohe	30	110	+ 5h 08' 12"	
83	Marco Haller	Austria	Red Bull–Bora–Hansgrohe	33	85	+ 4h 26' 52"	
84	Jai Hindley	Australia	Red Bull–Bora–Hansgrohe	28	18	+ 57' 04"	
85	Bob Jungels	Luxembourg	Red Bull–Bora–Hansgrohe	31	37	+ 2h 29' 05"	
86	Matteo Sobrero	Italy	Red Bull–Bora–Hansgrohe	27	60	+ 3h 46' 46"	
87	Danny van Poppel	Netherlands	Red Bull–Bora–Hansgrohe	30	120	+ 5h 22' 16"	
88	Aleksandr Vlasov		Red Bull–Bora–Hansgrohe	28	DNS-10	–	
91	David Gaudu	France	Groupama–FDJ	27	65	+ 3h 49' 23"	
92	Kevin Geniets	Luxembourg	Groupama–FDJ	27	58	+ 3h 44' 19"	
93	Romain Grégoire ‡	France	Groupama–FDJ	21	41	+ 2h 43' 41"	
94	Stefan Küng	Switzerland	Groupama–FDJ	30	DNS-19	–	
95	Valentin Madouas	France	Groupama–FDJ	27	25	+ 1h 51' 59"	
96	Lenny Martinez ‡	France	Groupama–FDJ	20	124	+ 5h 26' 45"	
97	Quentin Pacher	France	Groupama–FDJ	32	46	+ 3h 15' 07"	
98	Clément Russo	France	Groupama–FDJ	29	102	+ 4h 51' 24"	
101	Mathieu van der Poel	Netherlands	Alpecin–Deceuninck	29	96	+ 4h 44' 05"	
102	Silvan Dillier	Switzerland	Alpecin–Deceuninck	33	126	+ 5h 31' 21"	
103	Robbe Ghys	Belgium	Alpecin–Deceuninck	27	134	+ 5h 55' 14"	
104	Søren Kragh Andersen	Denmark	Alpecin–Deceuninck	29	OTL-12	–	
105	Axel Laurance ‡	France	Alpecin–Deceuninck	23	99	+ 4h 46' 25"	
106	Jasper Philipsen	Belgium	Alpecin–Deceuninck	26	128	+ 5h 34' 33"	
107	Jonas Rickaert	Belgium	Alpecin–Deceuninck	30	OTL-12	–	
108	Gianni Vermeersch	Belgium	Alpecin–Deceuninck	31	107	+ 5h 02' 07"	
111	Richard Carapaz	Ecuador	EF Education–EasyPost	31	17	+ 49' 24"	
112	Alberto Bettiol	Italy	EF Education–EasyPost	30	DNF-14	–	
113	Stefan Bissegger	Switzerland	EF Education–EasyPost	25	100	+ 4h 46' 55"	
114	Rui Costa	Portugal	EF Education–EasyPost	37	68	+ 3h 54' 10"	
115	Ben Healy ‡	Ireland	EF Education–EasyPost	23	27	+ 1h 56' 12"	
116	Neilson Powless	United States	EF Education–EasyPost	27	59	+ 3h 45' 24"	
117	Sean Quinn ‡	United States	EF Education–EasyPost	24	78	+ 4h 10' 38"	
118	Marijn van den Berg ‡	Netherlands	EF Education–EasyPost	24	109	+ 5h 07' 55"	
121	Arnaud De Lie ‡	Belgium	Lotto–Dstny	22	119	+ 5h 19' 56"	
122	Cedric Beullens	Belgium	Lotto–Dstny	27	121	+ 5h 23' 17"	
123	Victor Campenaerts	Belgium	Lotto–Dstny	32	81	+ 4h 23' 21"	
124	Jarrad Drizners ‡	Australia	Lotto–Dstny	25	139	+ 6h 12' 21"	
125	Sébastien Grignard ‡	Belgium	Lotto–Dstny	25	129	+ 5h 36' 52"	
126	Maxim Van Gils ‡	Belgium	Lotto–Dstny	24	DNS-16	–	
127	Harm Vanhoucke	Belgium	Lotto–Dstny	27	130	+ 5h 37' 11"	
128	Brent Van Moer	Belgium	Lotto–Dstny	26	95	+ 4h 42' 29"	
131	Stephen Williams	Great Britain	Israel–Premier Tech	28	73	+ 3h 59' 57"	
132	Pascal Ackermann	Germany	Israel–Premier Tech	30	112	+ 5h 10' 14"	
133	Guillaume Boivin	Canada	Israel–Premier Tech	35	DNS-14	–	
134	Jakob Fuglsang	Denmark	Israel–Premier Tech	39	38	+ 2h 31' 42"	
135	Derek Gee	Canada	Israel–Premier Tech	26	9	+ 27' 21"	
136	Hugo Houle	Canada	Israel–Premier Tech	33	50	+ 3h 26' 55"	
137	Krists Neilands	Latvia	Israel–Premier Tech	29	66	+ 3h 52' 08"	
138	Jake Stewart ‡	Great Britain	Israel–Premier Tech	24	DNS-19	–	
141	Guillaume Martin	France	Cofidis	31	13	+ 43' 49"	
142	Piet Allegaert	Belgium	Cofidis	29	114	+ 5h 16' 14"	
143	Bryan Coquard	France	Cofidis	32	104	+ 4h 56' 46"	
144	Simon Geschke	Germany	Cofidis	38	94	+ 4h 40' 30"	
145	Jesús Herrada	Spain	Cofidis	33	DNS-13	–	
146	Ion Izagirre	Spain	Cofidis	35	DNF-11	–	
147	Alexis Renard ‡	France	Cofidis	25	DNF-11	–	
148	Axel Zingle	France	Cofidis	25	108	+ 5h 04' 30"	
151	Enric Mas	Spain	Movistar Team	29	19	+ 1h 11' 05"	
152	Alex Aranburu	Spain	Movistar Team	28	71	+ 3h 57' 53"	
153	Davide Formolo	Italy	Movistar Team	31	72	+ 3h 59' 41"	
154	Fernando Gaviria	Colombia	Movistar Team	29	DNF-17	–	
155	Oier Lazkano ‡	Spain	Movistar Team	24	79	+ 4h 10' 41"	
156	Gregor Mühlberger	Austria	Movistar Team	30	56	+ 3h 40' 17"	
157	Nelson Oliveira	Portugal	Movistar Team	35	51	+ 3h 33' 54"	
158	Javier Romo ‡	Spain	Movistar Team	25	23	+ 1h 42' 26"	
161	Kévin Vauquelin ‡	France	Arkéa–B&B Hotels	23	91	+ 4h 33' 56"	
162	Amaury Capiot	Belgium	Arkéa–B&B Hotels	31	DNF-14	–	
163	Clément Champoussin	France	Arkéa–B&B Hotels	26	101	+ 4h 49' 59"	
164	Arnaud Démare	France	Arkéa–B&B Hotels	32	OTL-19	–	
165	Raúl García Pierna ‡	Spain	Arkéa–B&B Hotels	23	98	+ 4h 46' 12"	
166	Daniel McLay	Great Britain	Arkéa–B&B Hotels	32	136	+ 5h 58' 08"	
167	Luca Mozzato	Italy	Arkéa–B&B Hotels	26	137	+ 5h 59' 36"	
168	Cristián Rodríguez	Spain	Arkéa–B&B Hotels	29	36	+ 2h 26' 59"	
171	Louis Meintjes	South Africa	Intermarché–Wanty	32	20	+ 1h 11' 50"	
172	Biniam Girmay ‡	Eritrea	Intermarché–Wanty	24	113	+ 5h 12' 47"	
173	Kobe Goossens	Belgium	Intermarché–Wanty	28	69	+ 3h 56' 05"	
174	Hugo Page ‡	France	Intermarché–Wanty	22	117	+ 5h 17' 59"	
175	Laurenz Rex ‡	Belgium	Intermarché–Wanty	24	118	+ 5h 18' 20"	
176	Mike Teunissen	Netherlands	Intermarché–Wanty	31	93	+ 4h 40' 14"	
177	Gerben Thijssen	Belgium	Intermarché–Wanty	26	DNF-15	–	
178	Georg Zimmermann	Germany	Intermarché–Wanty	26	77	+ 4h 07' 59"	
181	Romain Bardet	France	Team dsm–firmenich PostNL	33	30	+ 2h 04' 25"	
182	Warren Barguil	France	Team dsm–firmenich PostNL	32	40	+ 2h 42' 13"	
183	John Degenkolb	Germany	Team dsm–firmenich PostNL	35	122	+ 5h 24' 08"	
184	Nils Eekhoff	Netherlands	Team dsm–firmenich PostNL	26	DNF-19	–	
185	Fabio Jakobsen	Netherlands	Team dsm–firmenich PostNL	27	DNF-12	–	
186	Oscar Onley ‡	Great Britain	Team dsm–firmenich PostNL	21	39	+ 2h 41' 39"	
187	Frank van den Broek ‡	Netherlands	Team dsm–firmenich PostNL	23	62	+ 3h 48' 02"	
188	Bram Welten	Netherlands	Team dsm–firmenich PostNL	27	OTL-15	–	
191	Mark Cavendish	Great Britain	Astana Qazaqstan Team	39	141	+ 6h 23' 11"	
192	Davide Ballerini	Italy	Astana Qazaqstan Team	29	140	+ 6h 22' 46"	
193	Cees Bol	Netherlands	Astana Qazaqstan Team	28	138	+ 6h 08' 11"	
194	Yevgeniy Fedorov ‡	Kazakhstan	Astana Qazaqstan Team	24	OTL-12	–	
195	Michele Gazzoli ‡	Italy	Astana Qazaqstan Team	25	DNF-1	–	
196	Alexey Lutsenko	Kazakhstan	Astana Qazaqstan Team	31	DNF-17	–	
197	Michael Mørkøv	Denmark	Astana Qazaqstan Team	39	DNS-12	–	
198	Harold Tejada	Colombia	Astana Qazaqstan Team	27	74	+ 4h 00' 13"	
201	Magnus Cort	Denmark	Uno-X Mobility	33	57	+ 3h 41' 57"	
202	Jonas Abrahamsen	Norway	Uno-X Mobility	28	55	+ 3h 38' 58"	
203	Odd Christian Eiking	Norway	Uno-X Mobility	29	34	+ 2h 18' 34"	
204	Tobias Halland Johannessen ‡	Norway	Uno-X Mobility	24	35	+ 2h 21' 37"	
205	Alexander Kristoff	Norway	Uno-X Mobility	36	131	+ 5h 39' 42"	
206	Johannes Kulset ‡	Norway	Uno-X Mobility	20	47	+ 3h 17' 42"	
207	Rasmus Tiller	Norway	Uno-X Mobility	27	105	+ 4h 56' 51"	
208	Søren Wærenskjold	Norway	Uno-X Mobility	24	133	+ 5h 46' 24"	
211	Steff Cras	Belgium	Team TotalEnergies	28	16	+ 49' 18"	
212	Mathieu Burgaudeau	France	Team TotalEnergies	25	63	+ 3h 48' 17"	
213	Sandy Dujardin	France	Team TotalEnergies	27	132	+ 5h 40' 58"	
214	Thomas Gachignard ‡	France	Team TotalEnergies	23	92	+ 4h 38' 30"	
215	Fabien Grellier	France	Team TotalEnergies	29	90	+ 4h 33' 40"	
216	Jordan Jegat ‡	France	Team TotalEnergies	25	28	+ 2h 02' 36"	
217	Anthony Turgis	France	Team TotalEnergies	30	106	+ 4h 59' 48"	
218	Mattéo Vercher ‡	France	Team TotalEnergies	23	103	+ 4h 55' 14"	

=== By team ===
(Netherlands) Visma–Lease a Bike (TVL)
No.	Rider	Pos.
1	Jonas Vingegaard (DEN)	2
2	Tiesj Benoot (BEL)	49
3	Matteo Jorgenson (USA)	8
4	Wilco Kelderman (NED)	21
5	Christophe Laporte (FRA)	84
6	Bart Lemmen (NED)	70
7	Jan Tratnik (SLO)	64
8	Wout van Aert (BEL)	52
Directeur sportif: Frans Maassen, Arthur van Dongen

(United Arab Emirates) UAE Team Emirates (UAD)
No.	Rider	Pos.
11	Tadej Pogačar (SLO)	1
12	João Almeida (POR)	4
13	Juan Ayuso (ESP)	DNF-13
14	Nils Politt (GER)	75
15	Pavel Sivakov (FRA)	32
16	Marc Soler (ESP)	44
17	Tim Wellens (BEL)	80
18	Adam Yates (GBR)	6
Directeur sportif: Andrej Hauptman, Simone Pedrazzini

(Australia) Team Jayco–AlUla (JAY)
No.	Rider	Pos.
21	Simon Yates (GBR)	12
22	Luke Durbridge (AUS)	123
23	Dylan Groenewegen (NED)	135
24	Chris Harper (AUS)	DNS-16
25	Christopher Juul-Jensen (DEN)	97
26	Michael Matthews (AUS)	89
27	Luka Mezgec (SLO)	116
28	Elmar Reinders (NED)	DNS-17
Directeur sportif: Mathew Hayman, Andrew Smith

(United Kingdom) INEOS Grenadiers (IGD)
No.	Rider	Pos.
31	Carlos Rodríguez (ESP)	7
32	Egan Bernal (COL)	29
33	Jonathan Castroviejo (ESP)	53
34	Laurens De Plus (BEL)	15
35	Michał Kwiatkowski (POL)	54
36	Thomas Pidcock (GBR)	DNS-14
37	Geraint Thomas (GBR)	42
38	Ben Turner (GBR)	115
Directeur sportif: Zakkari Dempster, Xabier Zandio Echaide

(United States) Lidl–Trek (LTK)
No.	Rider	Pos.
41	Giulio Ciccone (ITA)	11
42	Julien Bernard (FRA)	22
43	Tim Declercq (BEL)	DNS-11
44	Ryan Gibbons (RSA)	87
45	Mads Pedersen (DEN)	DNS-8
46	Toms Skujiņš (LVA)	45
47	Jasper Stuyven (BEL)	61
48	Carlos Verona (ESP)	24
Directeur sportif: Steven de Jongh, Maxime Monfort

(France) Decathlon–AG2R La Mondiale (DAT)
No.	Rider	Pos.
51	Felix Gall (AUT)	14
52	Bruno Armirail (FRA)	33
53	Sam Bennett (IRL)	DNF-17
54	Dorian Godon (FRA)	82
55	Paul Lapeira (FRA)	88
56	Oliver Naesen (BEL)	83
57	Nans Peters (FRA)	76
58	Nicolas Prodhomme (FRA)	48
Directeur sportif: Julien Jurdie, Sébastien Joly

Team Bahrain Victorious (TBV)
No.	Rider	Pos.
61	Pello Bilbao (ESP)	DNF-12
62	Nikias Arndt (GER)	111
63	Phil Bauhaus (GER)	DNS-17
64	Santiago Buitrago (COL)	10
65	Jack Haig (AUS)	31
66	Matej Mohorič (SLO)	127
67	Wout Poels (NED)	43
68	Fred Wright (GBR)	OTL-11
Directeur sportif: Xavier Florencio, Roman Kreuziger

(Belgium) Soudal–Quick-Step (SOQ)
No.	Rider	Pos.
71	Remco Evenepoel (BEL)	3
72	Jan Hirt (CZE)	67
73	Yves Lampaert (BEL)	125
74	Mikel Landa (ESP)	5
75	Gianni Moscon (ITA)	86
76	Casper Pedersen (DEN)	DNS-4
77	Ilan Van Wilder (BEL)	26
78	Louis Vervaeke (BEL)	DNF-14
Directeur sportif: Tom Steels, Davide Bramati

(Germany) Red Bull–Bora–Hansgrohe (RBH)
No.	Rider	Pos.
81	Primož Roglič (SLO)	DNS-13
82	Nico Denz (GER)	110
83	Marco Haller (AUT)	85
84	Jai Hindley (AUS)	18
85	Bob Jungels (LUX)	37
86	Matteo Sobrero (ITA)	60
87	Danny van Poppel (NED)	120
88	Aleksandr Vlasov	DNS-10
Directeur sportif: Rolf Aldag, Christian Pömer

(France) Groupama–FDJ (GFC)
No.	Rider	Pos.
91	David Gaudu (FRA)	65
92	Kevin Geniets (LUX)	58
93	Romain Grégoire (FRA)	41
94	Stefan Küng (SUI)	DNS-19
95	Valentin Madouas (FRA)	25
96	Lenny Martinez (FRA)	124
97	Quentin Pacher (FRA)	46
98	Clément Russo (FRA)	102
Directeur sportif: Frédéric Guesdon, Benoît Vaugrenard

(Belgium) Alpecin–Deceuninck (ADC)
No.	Rider	Pos.
101	Mathieu van der Poel (NED)	96
102	Silvan Dillier (SUI)	126
103	Robbe Ghys (BEL)	134
104	Søren Kragh Andersen (DEN)	OTL-12
105	Axel Laurance (FRA)	99
106	Jasper Philipsen (BEL)	128
107	Jonas Rickaert (BEL)	OTL-12
108	Gianni Vermeersch (BEL)	107
Directeur sportif: Christoph Roodhooft, Gianni Meersman

(United States) EF Education–EasyPost (EFE)
No.	Rider	Pos.
111	Richard Carapaz (ECU)	17
112	Alberto Bettiol (ITA)	DNF-14
113	Stefan Bissegger (SUI)	100
114	Rui Costa (POR)	68
115	Ben Healy (IRE)	27
116	Neilson Powless (USA)	59
117	Sean Quinn (USA)	78
118	Marijn van den Berg (NED)	109
Directeur sportif: Charles Wegelius, Tom Southam

(Belgium) Lotto–Dstny (LTD)
No.	Rider	Pos.
121	Arnaud De Lie (BEL)	119
122	Cedric Beullens (BEL)	121
123	Victor Campenaerts (BEL)	81
124	Jarrad Drizners (AUS)	139
125	Sébastien Grignard (BEL)	129
126	Maxim Van Gils (BEL)	DNS-16
127	Harm Vanhoucke (BEL)	130
128	Brent Van Moer (BEL)	95
Directeur sportif: Mario Aerts, Marc Wauters

Israel–Premier Tech (IPT)
No.	Rider	Pos.
131	Stephen Williams (GBR)	73
132	Pascal Ackermann (GER)	112
133	Guillaume Boivin (CAN)	DNS-14
134	Jakob Fuglsang (DEN)	38
135	Derek Gee (CAN)	9
136	Hugo Houle (CAN)	50
137	Krists Neilands (LVA)	66
138	Jake Stewart (GBR)	DNS-19
Directeur sportif: Steve Bauer, Dror Pekatch

(France) Cofidis (COF)
No.	Rider	Pos.
141	Guillaume Martin (FRA)	13
142	Piet Allegaert (BEL)	114
143	Bryan Coquard (FRA)	104
144	Simon Geschke (GER)	94
145	Jesús Herrada (ESP)	DNS-13
146	Ion Izagirre (ESP)	DNF-11
147	Alexis Renard (FRA)	DNF-11
148	Axel Zingle (FRA)	108
Directeur sportif: Thierry Marichal, Bingen Fernández

(Spain) Movistar Team (MOV)
No.	Rider	Pos.
151	Enric Mas (ESP)	19
152	Alex Aranburu (ESP)	71
153	Davide Formolo (ITA)	72
154	Fernando Gaviria (COL)	DNF-17
155	Oier Lazkano (ESP)	79
156	Gregor Mühlberger (AUT)	56
157	Nelson Oliveira (POR)	51
158	Javier Romo (ESP)	23
Directeur sportif: José Vicente García, Iván Velasco

(France) Arkéa–B&B Hotels (ARK)
No.	Rider	Pos.
161	Kévin Vauquelin (FRA)	91
162	Amaury Capiot (BEL)	DNF-14
163	Clément Champoussin (FRA)	101
164	Arnaud Démare (FRA)	OTL-19
165	Raúl García Pierna (ESP)	98
166	Daniel McLay (GBR)	136
167	Luca Mozzato (ITA)	137
168	Cristián Rodríguez (ESP)	36
Directeur sportif: Sébastien Hinault, Yvon Ledanois

(Belgium) Intermarché–Wanty (IWA)
No.	Rider	Pos.
171	Louis Meintjes (RSA)	20
172	Biniam Girmay (ERI)	113
173	Kobe Goossens (BEL)	69
174	Hugo Page (FRA)	117
175	Laurenz Rex (BEL)	118
176	Mike Teunissen (NED)	93
177	Gerben Thijssen (BEL)	DNF-15
178	Georg Zimmermann (GER)	77
Directeur sportif: Laurenzo Lapage, Aike Visbeek

(Netherlands) Team dsm–firmenich PostNL (DFP)
No.	Rider	Pos.
181	Romain Bardet (FRA)	30
182	Warren Barguil (FRA)	40
183	John Degenkolb (GER)	122
184	Nils Eekhoff (NED)	DNF-19
185	Fabio Jakobsen (NED)	DNF-12
186	Oscar Onley (GBR)	39
187	Frank van den Broek (NED)	62
188	Bram Welten (NED)	OTL-15
Directeur sportif: Christian Guiberteau, Matthew Winston

(Kazakhstan) Astana Qazaqstan Team (AST)
No.	Rider	Pos.
191	Mark Cavendish (GBR)	141
192	Davide Ballerini (ITA)	140
193	Cees Bol (NED)	138
194	Yevgeniy Fedorov (KAZ)	OTL-12
195	Michele Gazzoli (ITA)	DNF-1
196	Alexey Lutsenko (KAZ)	DNF-17
197	Michael Mørkøv (DEN)	DNS-12
198	Harold Tejada (COL)	74
Directeur sportif: Dmitry Fofonov, Stefano Zanini

(Norway) Uno-X Mobility (UXM)
No.	Rider	Pos.
201	Magnus Cort (DEN)	57
202	Jonas Abrahamsen (NOR)	55
203	Odd Christian Eiking (NOR)	34
204	Tobias Halland Johannessen (NOR)	35
205	Alexander Kristoff (NOR)	131
206	Johannes Kulset (NOR)	47
207	Rasmus Tiller (NOR)	105
208	Søren Wærenskjold (NOR)	133
Directeur sportif: Gabriel Rasch, Stig Kristiansen

(France) Team TotalEnergies (TEN)
No.	Rider	Pos.
211	Steff Cras (BEL)	16
212	Mathieu Burgaudeau (FRA)	63
213	Sandy Dujardin (FRA)	132
214	Thomas Gachignard (FRA)	92
215	Fabien Grellier (FRA)	90
216	Jordan Jegat (FRA)	28
217	Anthony Turgis (FRA)	106
218	Mattéo Vercher (FRA)	103
Directeur sportif: Benoît Génauzeau, Romain Sicard

=== By nationality ===
Country	No. of riders	Finished	Stage wins
Australia	6	5	
Austria	3	3	
Belgium	28	22	5 (Victor Campenaerts, Remco Evenepoel, Jasper Philipsen x3)
Canada	3	2	
Colombia	4	3	
Czechia	1	1	
Denmark	8	4	1 (Jonas Vingegaard)
Ecuador	1	1	1 (Richard Carapaz)
Eritrea	1	1	3 (Biniam Girmay x3)
France	32	30	3 (Romain Bardet, Anthony Turgis, Kévin Vauquelin)
Germany	8	7	
Great Britain	11	8	1 (Mark Cavendish)
Ireland	2	1	
Italy	8	6	
Kazakhstan	2	0	
Latvia	2	2	
Luxembourg	2	2	
Netherlands	14	10	1 (Dylan Groenewegen)
Norway	7	7	
Poland	1	1	
Portugal	3	3	
Slovenia	5	4	6 (Tadej Pogačar x6)
South Africa	2	2	
Spain	15	11	
Switzerland	3	2	
United States	3	3	
	1	0	
Total	176	141	21
