= 2024 Tour de France, Stage 1 to Stage 11 =

Cycling results

The 2024 Tour de France was the 111th edition of the Tour de France. It started in Florence, Italy, on 29 June, and finished in Nice, France, on 21 July. The race did not finish in (or near) Paris for the first time since its inception, owing to preparations for the 2024 Summer Olympics in Paris.

== Classification standings ==
Legend
Denotes the leader of the general classification	Denotes the leader of the mountains classification
Denotes the leader of the points classification	Denotes the leader of the young rider classification
Denotes the leader of the team classification	Denotes the winner of the combativity award

== Stage 1 ==
29 June 2024 – Florence to Rimini (Italy), 206 km (128 mi)

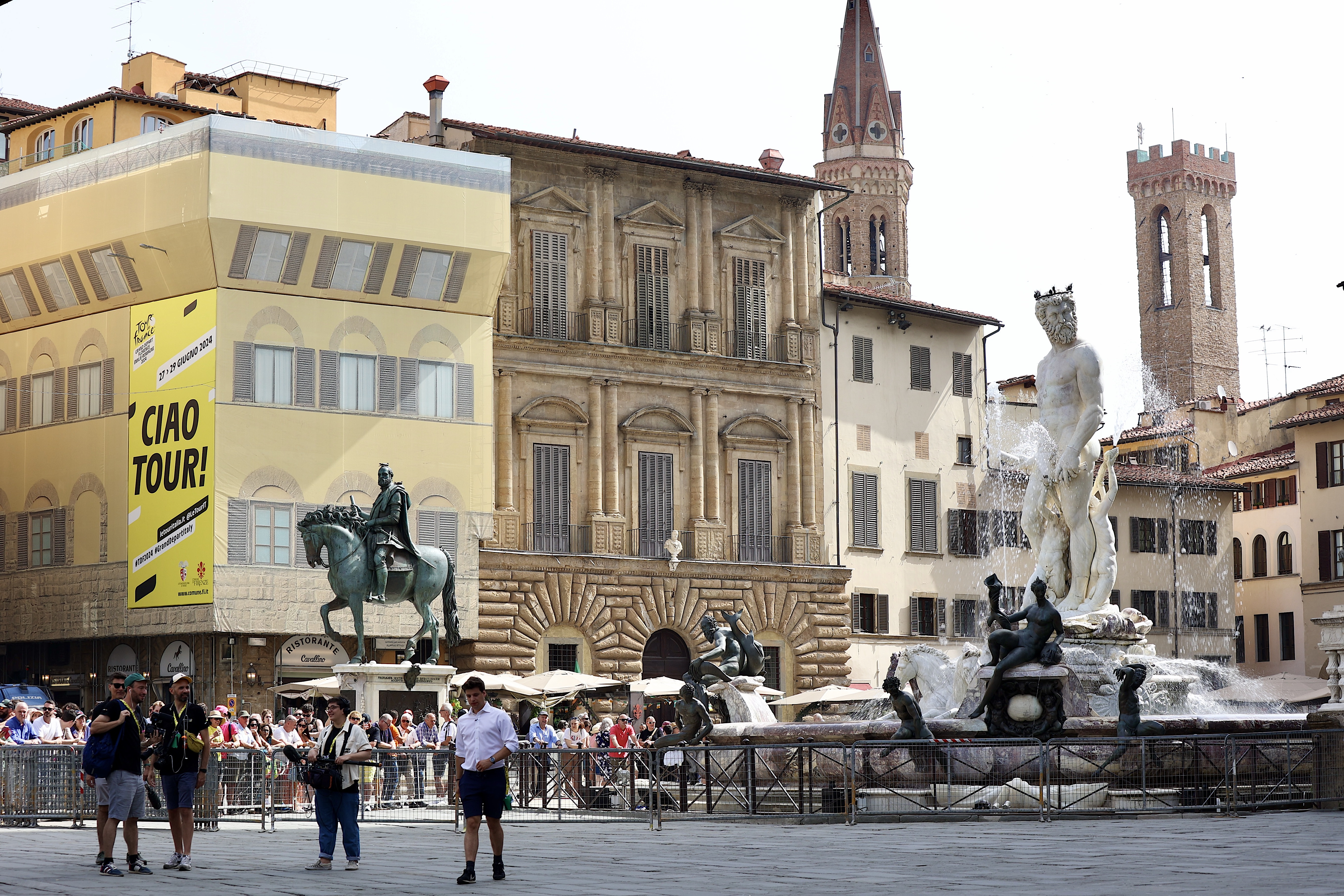
Florence in Italy hosted the start of the Tour

Stage 1 Result
Rank	Rider	Team	Time
1	Romain Bardet (FRA)	Team dsm–firmenich PostNL	5h 07' 22"
2	Frank van den Broek (NED)	Team dsm–firmenich PostNL	+ 0"
3	Wout van Aert (BEL)	Visma–Lease a Bike	+ 5"
4	Tadej Pogačar (SLO)	UAE Team Emirates	+ 5"
5	Maxim Van Gils (BEL)	Lotto–Dstny	+ 5"
6	Alex Aranburu (ESP)	Movistar Team	+ 5"
7	Mads Pedersen (DEN)	Lidl–Trek	+ 5"
8	Remco Evenepoel (BEL)	Soudal–Quick-Step	+ 5"
9	Pello Bilbao (ESP)	Team Bahrain Victorious	+ 5"
10	Alberto Bettiol (ITA)	EF Education–EasyPost	+ 5"

General classification after Stage 1
Rank	Rider	Team	Time
1	Romain Bardet (FRA)	Team dsm–firmenich PostNL	5h 07' 12"
2	Frank van den Broek (NED)	Team dsm–firmenich PostNL	+ 4"
3	Wout van Aert (BEL)	Visma–Lease a Bike	+ 11"
4	Tadej Pogačar (SLO)	UAE Team Emirates	+ 15"
5	Maxim Van Gils (BEL)	Lotto–Dstny	+ 15"
6	Alex Aranburu (ESP)	Movistar Team	+ 15"
7	Mads Pedersen (DEN)	Lidl–Trek	+ 15"
8	Remco Evenepoel (BEL)	Soudal–Quick-Step	+ 15"
9	Pello Bilbao (ESP)	Team Bahrain Victorious	+ 15"
10	Alberto Bettiol (ITA)	EF Education–EasyPost	+ 15"

== Stage 2 ==
30 June 2024 – Cesenatico to Bologna (Italy), 199.2 km (123.8 mi)

Stage 2 Result
Rank	Rider	Team	Time
1	Kévin Vauquelin (FRA)	Arkéa–B&B Hotels	4h 43' 42"
2	Jonas Abrahamsen (NOR)	Uno-X Mobility	+ 36"
3	Quentin Pacher (FRA)	Groupama–FDJ	+ 49"
4	Cristian Rodríguez (ESP)	Arkéa–B&B Hotels	+ 49"
5	Harold Tejada (COL)	Astana Qazaqstan Team	+ 49"
6	Nelson Oliveira (POR)	Movistar Team	+ 50"
7	Axel Laurance (FRA)	Alpecin–Deceuninck	+ 1' 12"
8	Mike Teunissen (NED)	Intermarché–Wanty	+ 1' 33"
9	Hugo Houle (CAN)	Israel–Premier Tech	+ 1' 36"
10	Richard Carapaz (ECU)	EF Education–EasyPost	+ 2' 21"

General classification after Stage 2
Rank	Rider	Team	Time
1	Tadej Pogačar (SLO)	UAE Team Emirates	9h 53' 30"
2	Remco Evenepoel (BEL)	Soudal–Quick-Step	+ 0"
3	Jonas Vingegaard (DEN)	Visma–Lease a Bike	+ 0"
4	Richard Carapaz (ECU)	EF Education–EasyPost	+ 0"
5	Romain Bardet (FRA)	Team dsm–firmenich PostNL	+ 6"
6	Maxim Van Gils (BEL)	Lotto–Dstny	+ 21"
7	Egan Bernal (COL)	INEOS Grenadiers	+ 21"
8	Pello Bilbao (ESP)	Team Bahrain Victorious	+ 21"
9	Tom Pidcock (GBR)	INEOS Grenadiers	+ 21"
10	Giulio Ciccone (ITA)	Lidl–Trek	+ 21"

== Stage 3 ==
1 July 2024 – Piacenza to Turin (Italy), 230.8 km (143.4 mi)

Stage 3 Result
Rank	Rider	Team	Time
1	Biniam Girmay (ERI)	Intermarché–Wanty	5h 26' 48"
2	Fernando Gaviria (COL)	Movistar Team	+ 0"
3	Arnaud De Lie (BEL)	Lotto–Dstny	+ 0"
4	Mads Pedersen (DEN)	Lidl–Trek	+ 0"
5	Dylan Groenewegen (NED)	Team Jayco–AlUla	+ 0"
6	Phil Bauhaus (GER)	Team Bahrain Victorious	+ 0"
7	Fabio Jakobsen (NED)	Team dsm–firmenich PostNL	+ 0"
8	Davide Ballerini (ITA)	Astana Qazaqstan Team	+ 0"
9	Sam Bennett (IRL)	Decathlon–AG2R La Mondiale	+ 0"
10	Bryan Coquard (FRA)	Cofidis	+ 0"

General classification after Stage 3
Rank	Rider	Team	Time
1	Richard Carapaz (ECU)	EF Education–EasyPost	15h 20' 18"
2	Tadej Pogačar (SLO)	UAE Team Emirates	+ 0"
3	Remco Evenepoel (BEL)	Soudal–Quick-Step	+ 0"
4	Jonas Vingegaard (DEN)	Visma–Lease a Bike	+ 0"
5	Romain Bardet (FRA)	Team dsm–firmenich PostNL	+ 6"
6	Pello Bilbao (ESP)	Team Bahrain Victorious	+ 21"
7	Guillaume Martin (FRA)	Cofidis	+ 21"
8	Egan Bernal (COL)	INEOS Grenadiers	+ 21"
9	Jai Hindley (AUS)	Red Bull–Bora–Hansgrohe	+ 21"
10	Aleksandr Vlasov	Red Bull–Bora–Hansgrohe	+ 21"

== Stage 4 ==
2 July 2024 – Pinerolo (Italy) to Valloire, 139.6 km (86.7 mi)

Stage 4 Result
Rank	Rider	Team	Time
1	Tadej Pogačar (SLO)	UAE Team Emirates	3h 46' 38"
2	Remco Evenepoel (BEL)	Soudal–Quick-Step	+ 35"
3	Juan Ayuso (ESP)	UAE Team Emirates	+ 35"
4	Primož Roglič (SLO)	Red Bull–Bora–Hansgrohe	+ 35"
5	Jonas Vingegaard (DEN)	Visma–Lease a Bike	+ 37"
6	Carlos Rodríguez (ESP)	INEOS Grenadiers	+ 37"
7	Mikel Landa (ESP)	Soudal–Quick-Step	+ 53"
8	João Almeida (POR)	UAE Team Emirates	+ 53"
9	Giulio Ciccone (ITA)	Lidl–Trek	+ 2' 41"
10	Santiago Buitrago (COL)	Team Bahrain Victorious	+ 2' 41"

General classification after Stage 4
Rank	Rider	Team	Time
1	Tadej Pogačar (SLO)	UAE Team Emirates	19h 06' 38"
2	Remco Evenepoel (BEL)	Soudal–Quick-Step	+ 45"
3	Jonas Vingegaard (DEN)	Visma–Lease a Bike	+ 50"
4	Juan Ayuso (ESP)	UAE Team Emirates	+ 1' 10"
5	Primož Roglič (SLO)	Red Bull–Bora–Hansgrohe	+ 1' 14"
6	Carlos Rodríguez (ESP)	INEOS Grenadiers	+ 1' 16"
7	Mikel Landa (ESP)	Soudal–Quick-Step	+ 1' 32"
8	João Almeida (POR)	UAE Team Emirates	+ 1' 32"
9	Giulio Ciccone (ITA)	Lidl–Trek	+ 3' 20"
10	Egan Bernal (COL)	INEOS Grenadiers	+ 3' 21"

== Stage 5 ==
3 July 2024 – Saint-Jean-de-Maurienne to Saint-Vulbas, 177.4 km (110.2 mi)

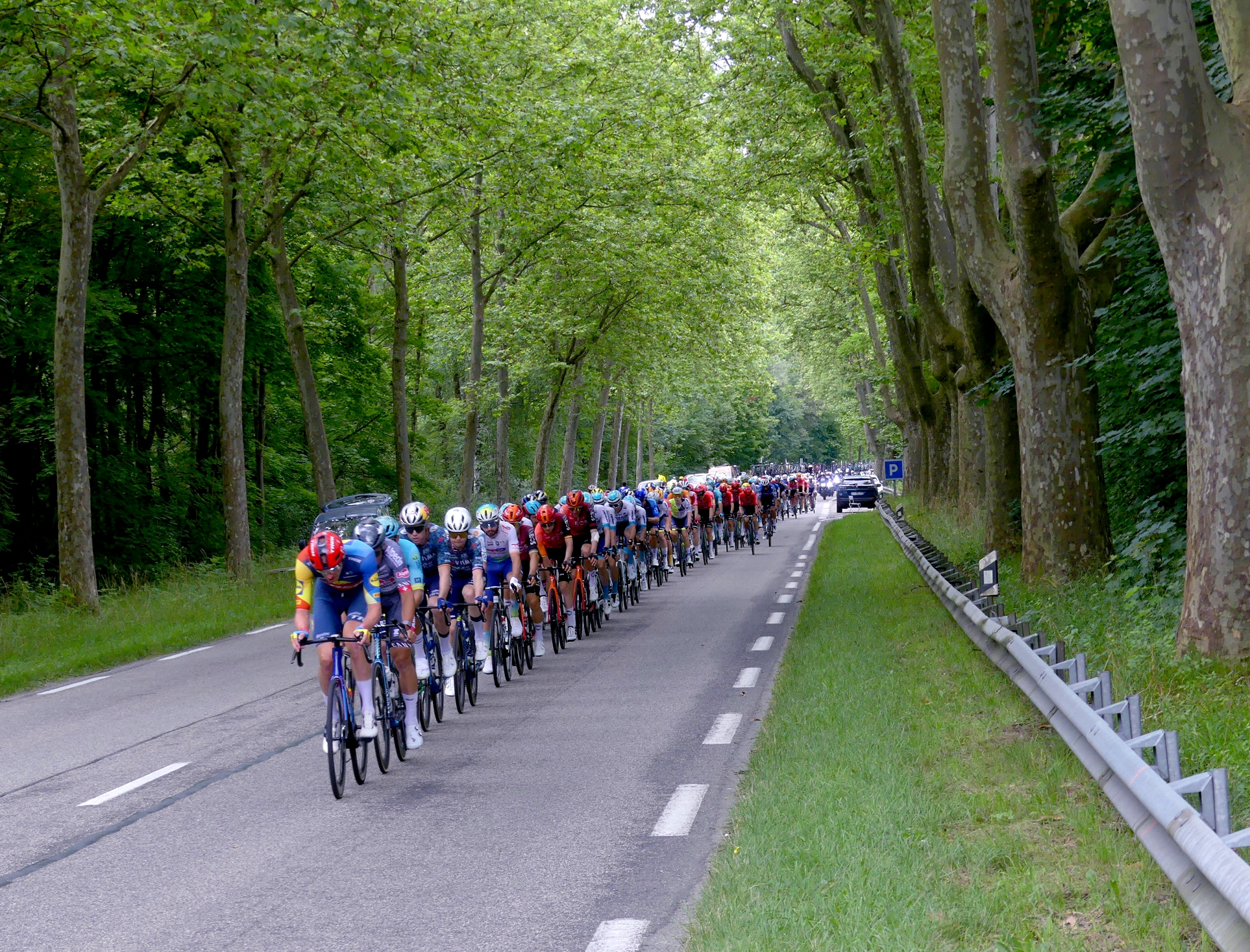
Peloton riding along the Maurienne valley

Stage 5 Result
Rank	Rider	Team	Time
1	Mark Cavendish (GBR)	Astana Qazaqstan Team	4h 08' 46"
2	Jasper Philipsen (BEL)	Alpecin–Deceuninck	+ 0"
3	Alexander Kristoff (NOR)	Uno-X Mobility	+ 0"
4	Arnaud de Lie (BEL)	Lotto–Dstny	+ 0"
5	Fabio Jakobsen (NED)	Team dsm–firmenich PostNL	+ 0"
6	Pascal Ackermann (GER)	Israel–Premier Tech	+ 0"
7	Arnaud Démare (FRA)	Arkéa–B&B Hotels	+ 0"
8	Gerben Thijssen (BEL)	Intermarché–Wanty	+ 0"
9	Biniam Girmay (ERI)	Intermarché–Wanty	+ 0"
10	Marijn van den Berg (NED)	EF Education–EasyPost	+ 0"

General classification after Stage 5
Rank	Rider	Team	Time
1	Tadej Pogačar (SLO)	UAE Team Emirates	23h 15' 24"
2	Remco Evenepoel (BEL)	Soudal–Quick-Step	+ 45"
3	Jonas Vingegaard (DEN)	Visma–Lease a Bike	+ 50"
4	Juan Ayuso (ESP)	UAE Team Emirates	+ 1' 10"
5	Primož Roglič (SLO)	Red Bull–Bora–Hansgrohe	+ 1' 14"
6	Carlos Rodríguez (ESP)	INEOS Grenadiers	+ 1' 16"
7	Mikel Landa (ESP)	Soudal–Quick-Step	+ 1' 32"
8	João Almeida (POR)	UAE Team Emirates	+ 1' 32"
9	Giulio Ciccone (ITA)	Lidl–Trek	+ 3' 20"
10	Egan Bernal (COL)	INEOS Grenadiers	+ 3' 21"

== Stage 6 ==
4 July 2024 – Mâcon to Dijon, 163.5 km (101.6 mi)

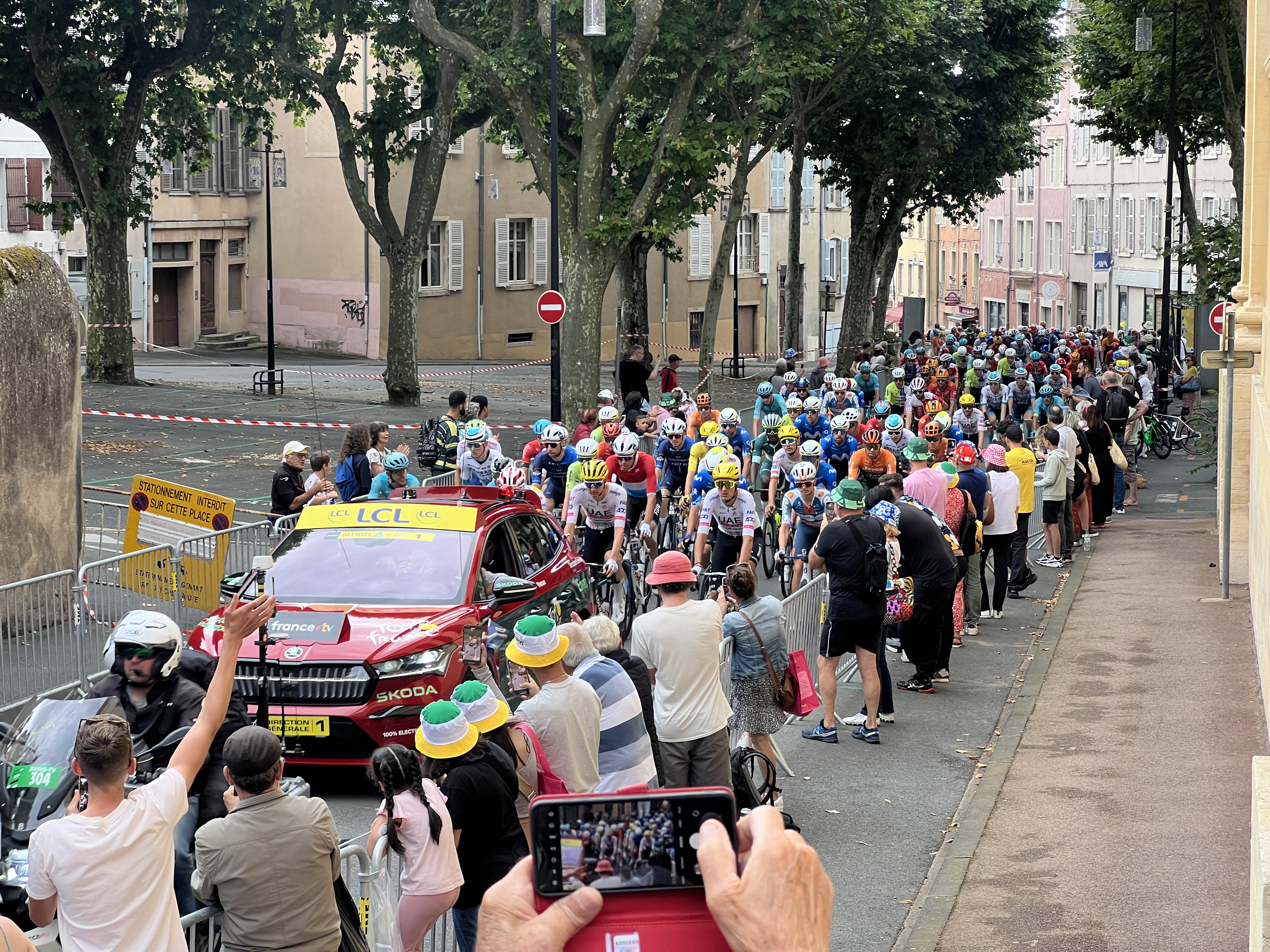
The Tour departing the start in Mâcon

Stage 6 Result
Rank	Rider	Team	Time
1	Dylan Groenewegen (NED)	Team Jayco–AlUla	3h 31' 55"
2	Biniam Girmay (ERI)	Intermarché–Wanty	+ 0"
3	Fernando Gaviria (COL)	Movistar Team	+ 0"
4	Phil Bauhaus (GER)	Team Bahrain Victorious	+ 0"
5	Arnaud de Lie (BEL)	Lotto–Dstny	+ 0"
6	Wout van Aert (BEL)	Visma–Lease a Bike	+ 0"
7	Arnaud Démare (FRA)	Arkéa–B&B Hotels	+ 0"
8	Alexander Kristoff (NOR)	Uno-X Mobility	+ 0"
9	Pascal Ackermann (GER)	Israel–Premier Tech	+ 0"
10	Piet Allegaert (BEL)	Cofidis	+ 0"

General classification after Stage 6
Rank	Rider	Team	Time
1	Tadej Pogačar (SLO)	UAE Team Emirates	26h 47' 19"
2	Remco Evenepoel (BEL)	Soudal–Quick-Step	+ 45"
3	Jonas Vingegaard (DEN)	Visma–Lease a Bike	+ 50"
4	Juan Ayuso (ESP)	UAE Team Emirates	+ 1' 10"
5	Primož Roglič (SLO)	Red Bull–Bora–Hansgrohe	+ 1' 14"
6	Carlos Rodríguez (ESP)	INEOS Grenadiers	+ 1' 16"
7	Mikel Landa (ESP)	Soudal–Quick-Step	+ 1' 32"
8	João Almeida (POR)	UAE Team Emirates	+ 1' 32"
9	Giulio Ciccone (ITA)	Lidl–Trek	+ 3' 20"
10	Egan Bernal (COL)	INEOS Grenadiers	+ 3' 21"

== Stage 7 ==
5 July 2024 – Nuits-Saint-Georges to Gevrey-Chambertin, 25.3 km (15.7 mi)

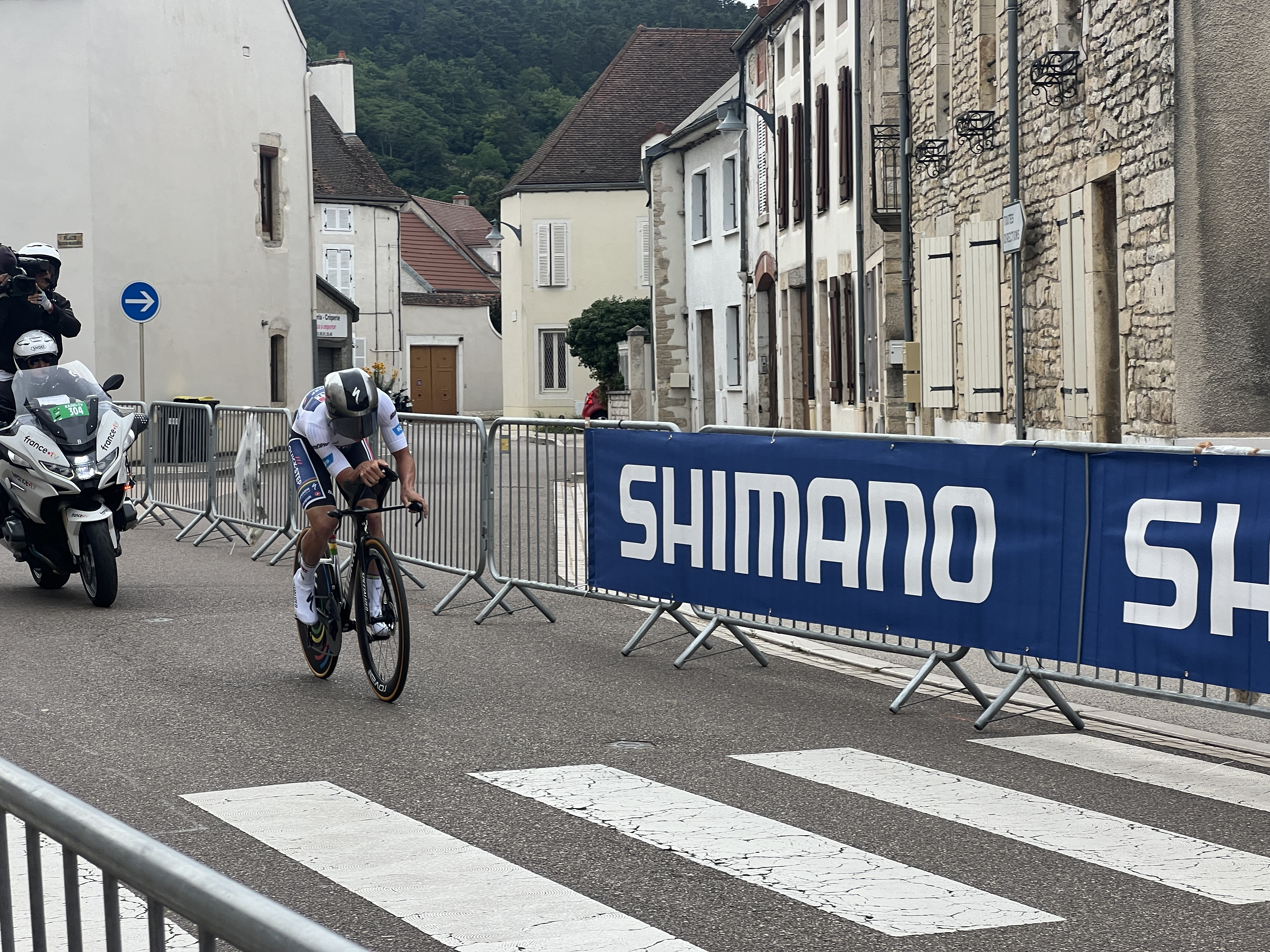
Stage winner Remco Evenepoel riding the individual time trial

Stage 7 Result
Rank	Rider	Team	Time
1	Remco Evenepoel (BEL)	Soudal–Quick-Step	28' 52"
2	Tadej Pogačar (SLO)	UAE Team Emirates	+ 12"
3	Primož Roglič (SLO)	Red Bull–Bora–Hansgrohe	+ 34"
4	Jonas Vingegaard (DEN)	Visma–Lease a Bike	+ 37"
5	Victor Campenaerts (BEL)	Lotto–Dstny	+ 52"
6	Kévin Vauquelin (FRA)	Arkéa–B&B Hotels	+ 52"
7	Matteo Jorgenson (USA)	Visma–Lease a Bike	+ 54"
8	João Almeida (POR)	UAE Team Emirates	+ 57"
9	Ben Healy (IRL)	EF Education–EasyPost	+ 59"
10	Stefan Küng (SUI)	Groupama–FDJ	+ 1' 00"

General classification after Stage 7
Rank	Rider	Team	Time
1	Tadej Pogačar (SLO)	UAE Team Emirates	27h 16' 23"
2	Remco Evenepoel (BEL)	Soudal–Quick-Step	+ 33"
3	Jonas Vingegaard (DEN)	Visma–Lease a Bike	+ 1' 15"
4	Primož Roglič (SLO)	Red Bull–Bora–Hansgrohe	+ 1' 36"
5	Juan Ayuso (ESP)	UAE Team Emirates	+ 2' 16"
6	João Almeida (POR)	UAE Team Emirates	+ 2' 17"
7	Carlos Rodríguez (ESP)	INEOS Grenadiers	+ 2' 31"
8	Mikel Landa (ESP)	Soudal–Quick-Step	+ 3' 35"
9	Matteo Jorgenson (USA)	Visma–Lease a Bike	+ 4' 03"
10	Aleksandr Vlasov	Red Bull–Bora–Hansgrohe	+ 4' 36"

== Stage 8 ==
6 July 2024 – Semur-en-Auxois to Colombey-les-Deux-Églises, 183.4 km (114.0 mi)

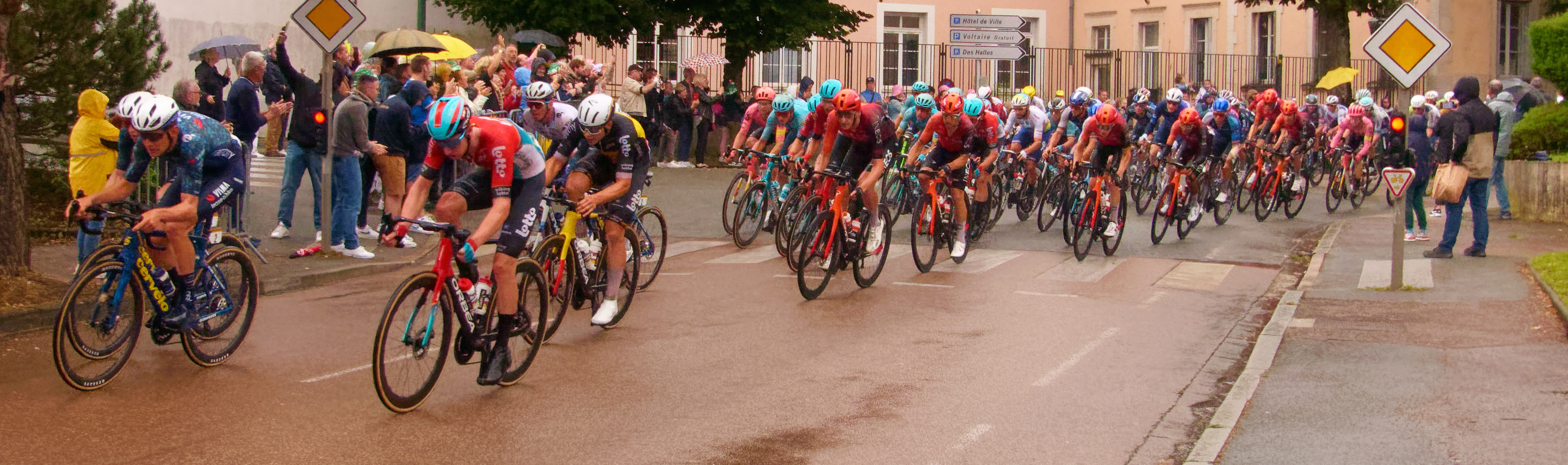
Peloton passing through Chaumont

Stage 8 Result
Rank	Rider	Team	Time
1	Biniam Girmay (ERI)	Intermarché–Wanty	4h 04' 50"
2	Jasper Philipsen (BEL)	Alpecin–Deceuninck	+ 0"
3	Arnaud De Lie (BEL)	Lotto–Dstny	+ 0"
4	Pascal Ackermann (GER)	Israel–Premier Tech	+ 0"
5	Marijn van den Berg (NED)	EF Education–EasyPost	+ 0"
6	Ryan Gibbons (RSA)	Lidl–Trek	+ 0"
7	Anthony Turgis (FRA)	Team TotalEnergies	+ 0"
8	Fred Wright (GBR)	Team Bahrain Victorious	+ 0"
9	Alex Aranburu (ESP)	Movistar Team	+ 0"
10	Remco Evenepoel (BEL)	Soudal–Quick-Step	+ 0"

General classification after Stage 8
Rank	Rider	Team	Time
1	Tadej Pogačar (SLO)	UAE Team Emirates	31h 21' 13"
2	Remco Evenepoel (BEL)	Soudal–Quick-Step	+ 33"
3	Jonas Vingegaard (DEN)	Visma–Lease a Bike	+ 1' 15"
4	Primož Roglič (SLO)	Red Bull–Bora–Hansgrohe	+ 1' 36"
5	Juan Ayuso (ESP)	UAE Team Emirates	+ 2' 16"
6	João Almeida (POR)	UAE Team Emirates	+ 2' 17"
7	Carlos Rodríguez (ESP)	INEOS Grenadiers	+ 2' 31"
8	Mikel Landa (ESP)	Soudal–Quick-Step	+ 3' 35"
9	Matteo Jorgenson (USA)	Visma–Lease a Bike	+ 4' 03"
10	Aleksandr Vlasov	Red Bull–Bora–Hansgrohe	+ 4' 36"

== Stage 9 ==
7 July 2024 – Troyes to Troyes, 199 km (124 mi)

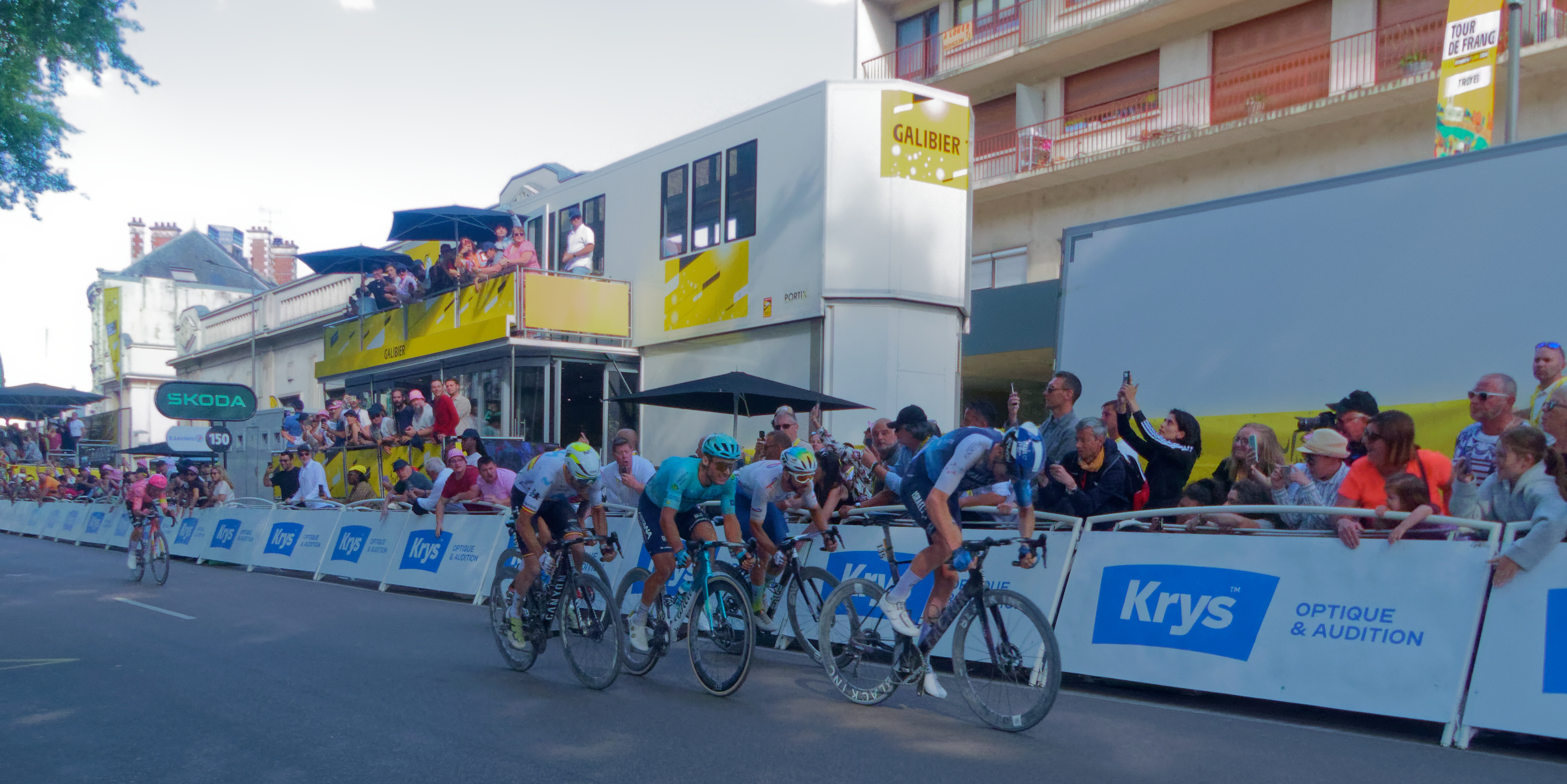
Breakaway approaching the finish in Troyes

Stage 9 Result
Rank	Rider	Team	Time
1	Anthony Turgis (FRA)	Team TotalEnergies	4h 19' 43"
2	Tom Pidcock (GBR)	INEOS Grenadiers	+ 0"
3	Derek Gee (CAN)	Israel–Premier Tech	+ 0"
4	Alex Aranburu (ESP)	Movistar Team	+ 0"
5	Ben Healy (IRL)	EF Education–EasyPost	+ 0"
6	Alexey Lutsenko (KAZ)	Astana Qazaqstan Team	+ 0"
7	Javier Romo (ESP)	Movistar Team	+ 12"
8	Jasper Stuyven (BEL)	Lidl–Trek	+ 18"
9	Biniam Girmay (ERI)	Intermarché–Wanty	+ 1' 17"
10	Michael Matthews (AUS)	Team Jayco–AlUla	+ 1' 17"

General classification after Stage 9
Rank	Rider	Team	Time
1	Tadej Pogačar (SLO)	UAE Team Emirates	35h 42' 42"
2	Remco Evenepoel (BEL)	Soudal–Quick-Step	+ 33"
3	Jonas Vingegaard (DEN)	Visma–Lease a Bike	+ 1' 15"
4	Primož Roglič (SLO)	Red Bull–Bora–Hansgrohe	+ 1' 36"
5	Juan Ayuso (ESP)	UAE Team Emirates	+ 2' 16"
6	João Almeida (POR)	UAE Team Emirates	+ 2' 17"
7	Carlos Rodríguez (ESP)	INEOS Grenadiers	+ 2' 31"
8	Mikel Landa (ESP)	Soudal–Quick-Step	+ 3' 35"
9	Derek Gee (CAN)	Israel–Premier Tech	+ 4' 02"
10	Matteo Jorgenson (USA)	Visma–Lease a Bike	+ 4' 03"

== Rest day 1 ==
8 July 2024 – Orléans

== Stage 10 ==
9 July 2024 – Orléans to Saint-Amand-Montrond, 187.3 km (116.4 mi)

Stage 10 Result
Rank	Rider	Team	Time
1	Jasper Philipsen (BEL)	Alpecin–Deceuninck	4h 20' 06"
2	Biniam Girmay (ERI)	Intermarché–Wanty	+ 0"
3	Pascal Ackermann (GER)	Israel–Premier Tech	+ 0"
4	Wout van Aert (BEL)	Visma–Lease a Bike	+ 0"
5	Fernando Gaviria (COL)	Movistar Team	+ 0"
6	Sam Bennett (IRL)	Decathlon–AG2R La Mondiale	+ 0"
7	John Degenkolb (GER)	Team dsm–firmenich PostNL	+ 0"
8	Phil Bauhaus (GER)	Team Bahrain Victorious	+ 0"
9	Dylan Groenewegen (NED)	Team Jayco–AlUla	+ 0"
10	Axel Zingle (FRA)	Cofidis	+ 0"

General classification after Stage 10
Rank	Rider	Team	Time
1	Tadej Pogačar (SLO)	UAE Team Emirates	40h 02' 48"
2	Remco Evenepoel (BEL)	Soudal–Quick-Step	+ 33"
3	Jonas Vingegaard (DEN)	Visma–Lease a Bike	+ 1' 15"
4	Primož Roglič (SLO)	Red Bull–Bora–Hansgrohe	+ 1' 36"
5	Juan Ayuso (ESP)	UAE Team Emirates	+ 2' 16"
6	João Almeida (POR)	UAE Team Emirates	+ 2' 17"
7	Carlos Rodríguez (ESP)	INEOS Grenadiers	+ 2' 31"
8	Mikel Landa (ESP)	Soudal–Quick-Step	+ 3' 35"
9	Derek Gee (CAN)	Israel–Premier Tech	+ 4' 02"
10	Matteo Jorgenson (USA)	Visma–Lease a Bike	+ 4' 03"

== Stage 11 ==
10 July 2024 – Évaux-les-Bains to Le Lioran, 211 km (131 mi)

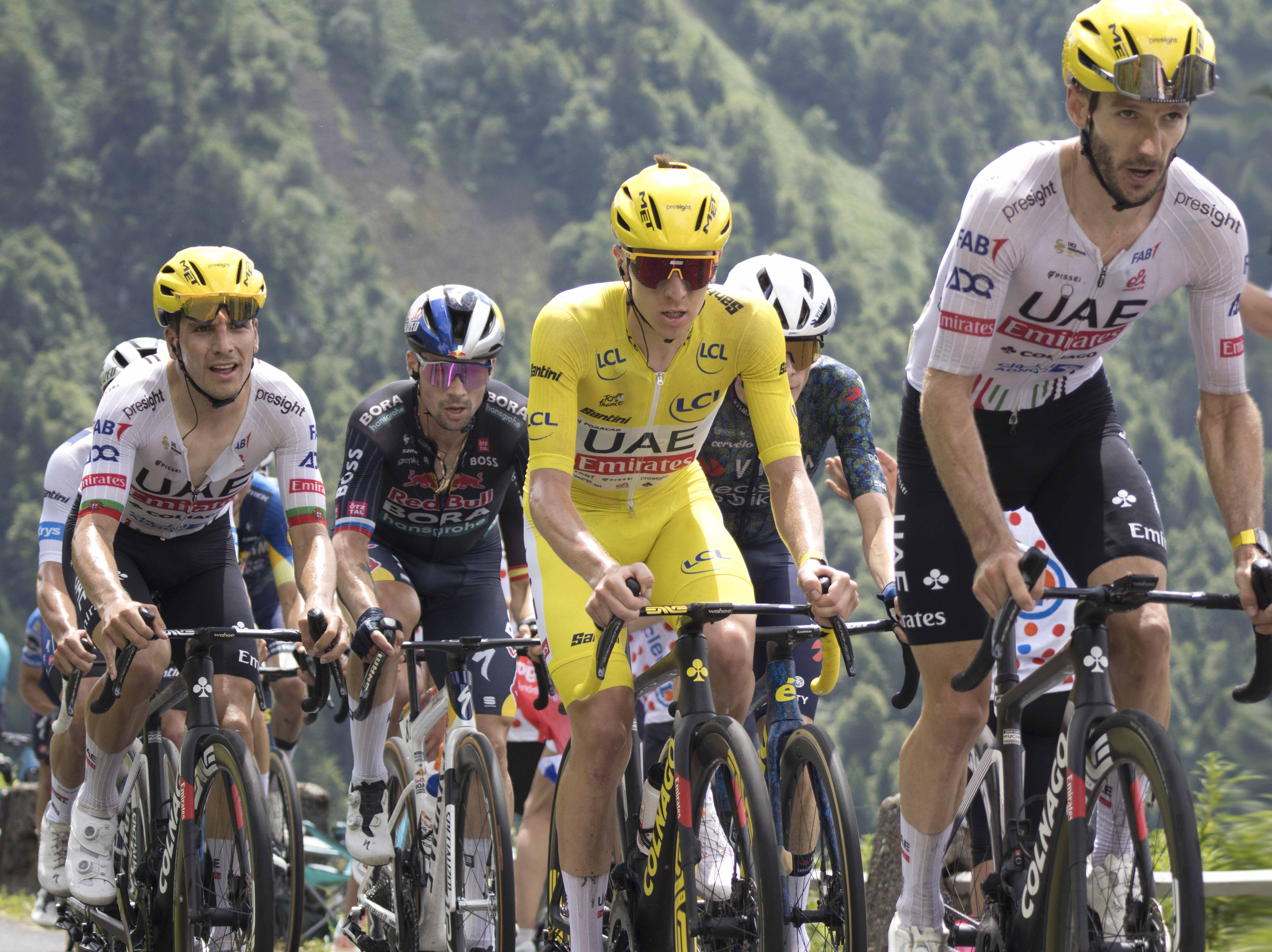
Adam Yates of UAE Team Emirates leading Tadej Pogačar, with Primož Roglič behind

Stage 11 Result
Rank	Rider	Team	Time
1	Jonas Vingegaard (DEN)	Visma–Lease a Bike	4h 58' 00"
2	Tadej Pogačar (SLO)	UAE Team Emirates	+ 0"
3	Remco Evenepoel (BEL)	Soudal–Quick-Step	+ 25"
4	Primož Roglič (SLO)	Red Bull–Bora–Hansgrohe	+ 25"
5	Giulio Ciccone (ITA)	Lidl–Trek	+ 1' 47"
6	João Almeida (POR)	UAE Team Emirates	+ 1' 49"
7	Adam Yates (GBR)	UAE Team Emirates	+ 1' 49"
8	Mikel Landa (ESP)	Soudal–Quick-Step	+ 1' 49"
9	Carlos Rodríguez (ESP)	INEOS Grenadiers	+ 1' 55"
10	Felix Gall (AUT)	Decathlon–AG2R La Mondiale	+ 2' 38"

General classification after Stage 11
Rank	Rider	Team	Time
1	Tadej Pogačar (SLO)	UAE Team Emirates	45h 00' 34"
2	Remco Evenepoel (BEL)	Soudal–Quick-Step	+ 1' 06"
3	Jonas Vingegaard (DEN)	Visma–Lease a Bike	+ 1' 14"
4	Primož Roglič (SLO)	Red Bull–Bora–Hansgrohe	+ 2' 15"
5	João Almeida (POR)	UAE Team Emirates	+ 4' 20"
6	Carlos Rodríguez (ESP)	INEOS Grenadiers	+ 4' 40"
7	Mikel Landa (ESP)	Soudal–Quick-Step	+ 5' 38"
8	Adam Yates (GBR)	UAE Team Emirates	+ 6' 59"
9	Juan Ayuso (ESP)	UAE Team Emirates	+ 7' 09"
10	Giulio Ciccone (ITA)	Lidl–Trek	+ 7' 36"
