= Fabien Grellier =

French road cyclist

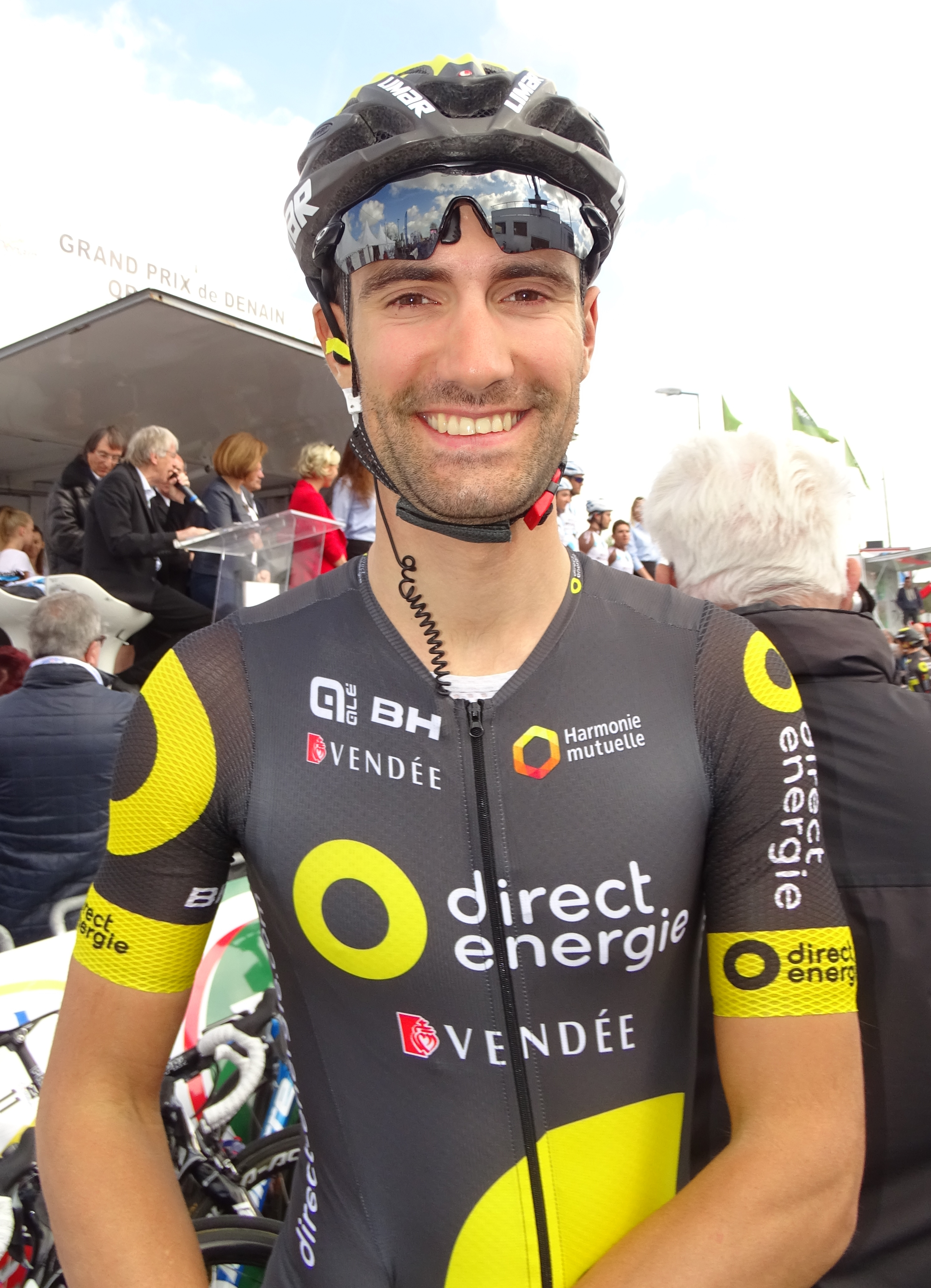
- Grellier in 2017.

Personal information
- Full name: Fabien Grellier
- Born: 31 October 1994 (age 31) Aizenay, France
- Height: 1.80 m (5 ft 11 in)
- Weight: 64 kg (141 lb; 10 st 1 lb)

Cycling career
- Sport: Cycling
- Current team: Team TotalEnergies
- Discipline: Road
- Role: Rider

Amateur teams
- 2012: VC Agésinate Junior
- 2013–2015: Vendée U

Professional team
- 2016–: Direct Énergie

Fabien Grellier (born 31 October 1994) is a French cyclist, who currently rides for UCI ProTeam Team TotalEnergies.

== Career ==
Grellier was born in Aizenay. In July 2018, he was named in the start list for the Tour de France. He also rode in the race in 2019 and 2020, completing all three of them. In 2020, he wore the polka dot jersey of the mountains classification leader, after the opening day of racing.

== Major results ==
2014
5th Paris–Roubaix Espoirs
2015
4th Overall Le Triptyque des Monts et Châteaux
8th Ronde van Vlaanderen U23
10th Overall Tour Alsace
2017
2nd La Roue Tourangelle
9th Polynormande
2018
7th Tour du Finistère
2020
Tour de France

Held after Stage 1

2022
6th Classic Loire Atlantique
2024
Combativity award Stage 3 Tour de France

=== Grand Tour general classification results timeline ===
Grand Tour	2018	2019	2020	2021	2022	2023	2024
Giro d'Italia	—	—	—	—	—	—	—
Tour de France	120	121	117	—	—	—	90
Vuelta a España	—	—	—	—	—	—	—

Legend
—	Did not compete
DNF	Did not finish
