= 2024 Tour de France =

Cycling race

2024 UCI World Tour, race 25 of 35
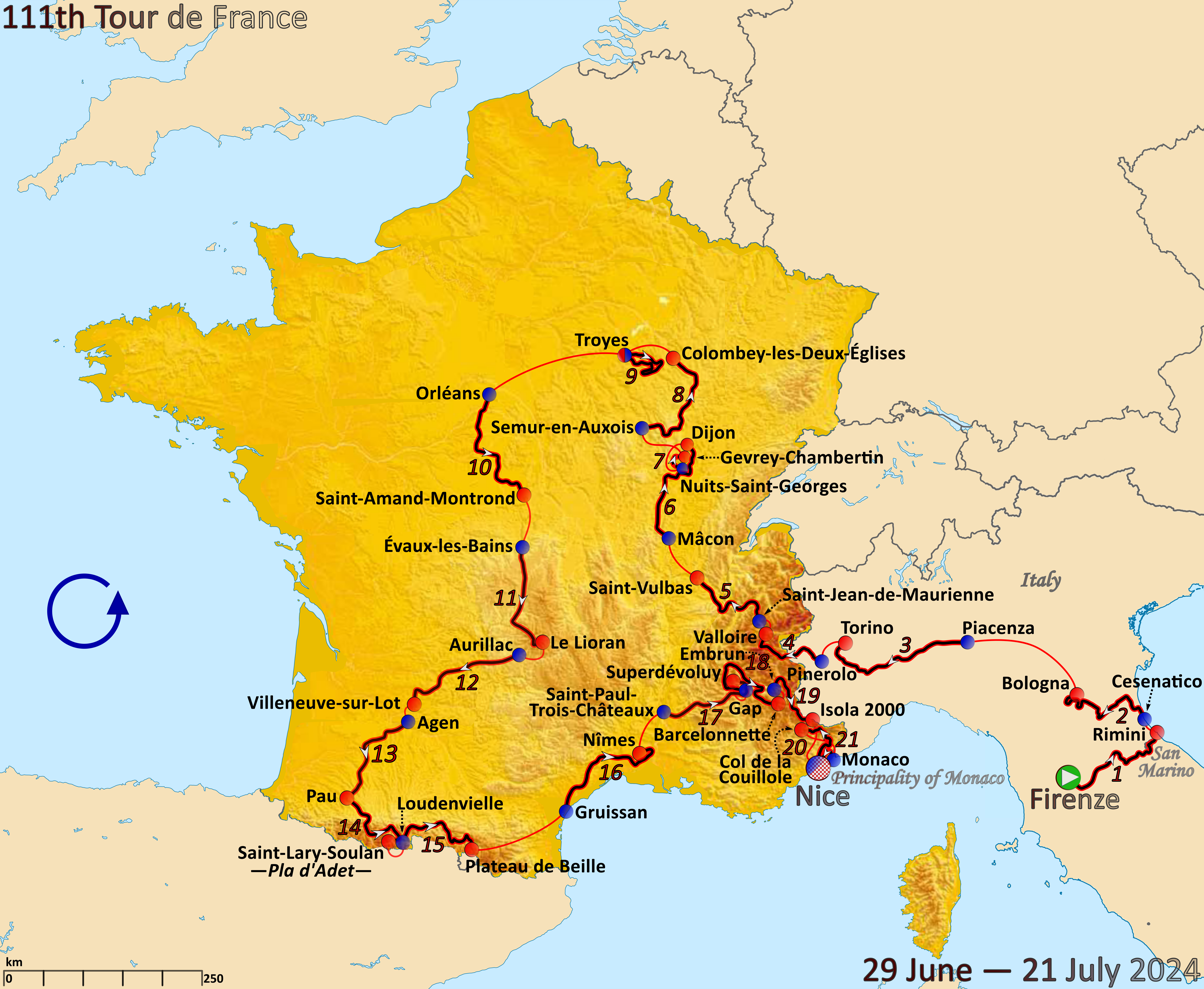
- Route of the 2024 Tour de France

Race details
- Dates: 29 June – 21 July 2024
- Stages: 21
- Distance: 3,498 km (2,174 mi)
- Winning time: 83h 38' 56"

Results
Jersey awarded to the overall winner	Winner	Tadej Pogačar (SLO)	(UAE Team Emirates)
	Second	Jonas Vingegaard (DEN)	(Visma–Lease a Bike)
	Third	Remco Evenepoel (BEL)	(Soudal–Quick-Step)
Jersey awarded to the points classification winner	Points	Biniam Girmay (ERI)	(Intermarché–Wanty)
Jersey awarded to the mountains classification winner	Mountains	Richard Carapaz (ECU)	(EF Education–EasyPost)
Jersey awarded to the young rider classification winner	Young rider	Remco Evenepoel (BEL)	(Soudal–Quick-Step)
Jersey awarded to the combativity classification winner	Combativity	Richard Carapaz (ECU)	(EF Education–EasyPost)
Jersey awarded to the team classification winner	Team	(United Arab Emirates) UAE Team Emirates	

The 2024 Tour de France was the 111th edition of the Tour de France. It started in Florence, Italy, on 29 June, and finished in Nice, France, on 21 July. The race did not finish in (or near) Paris for the first time since its inception, owing to preparations for the 2024 Summer Olympics in Paris.

Tadej Pogačar won the general classification, his third victory after 2020 and 2021 and a return to the top spot after placing second in 2022 and 2023. Pogačar won six stages, including the last three. Second and third place were taken by Jonas Vingegaard (Visma–Lease a Bike) and tour debutant Remco Evenepoel (Soudal–Quick-Step). Pogačar's team, UAE Team Emirates, won the team classification.

The race began with three stages in Italy before entering France. The first two stages were won by French riders. Romain Bardet narrowly won the opening stage from a breakaway with teammate Frank van den Broek, five seconds ahead of the peloton, to earn the first yellow jersey. Kévin Vauquelin won the second stage, but Pogačar claimed the race lead. In Stage 3, Pogačar relinquished the race lead to Richard Carapaz, but then won Stage 4, from Pinerolo (Italy) to Valloire, to regain it. He remained in yellow all the way to the finish in Nice, winning five more stages along the way, including the final time trial. Sprinters Biniam Girmay and Jasper Philipsen won three stages each. Pogačar, who finished 6 minutes and 17 seconds ahead of two-time winner Vingegaard, became the first rider to win both the Tour de France and Giro d'Italia in the same year since Marco Pantani in 1998.

Girmay won the points classification; Carapaz won the mountains classification and the overall combativity award; and Evenepoel won the young rider classification. Mark Cavendish won the 5th stage, his 35th stage victory at the Tour de France, breaking the record of 34 stage wins held by Eddy Merckx since 1975. In recognition of both this record and his long and popular career in the Tour a special presentation was made to Mark Cavendish on the final podium, a framed black cycling jersey bearing the Tour de France logo and the letters "CAXXXV" (XXXV being Roman numerals for 35).

== Teams ==
Twenty-two teams took part in the race. All 18 UCI WorldTeams were automatically invited. They were joined by four UCI ProTeams: the two highest placed UCI ProTeams in 2023 (Lotto–Dstny and Israel–Premier Tech), along with Uno-X Mobility and Team TotalEnergies who were selected by Amaury Sport Organisation (ASO), the organisers of the Tour. The teams were announced on 18 January 2024. A total of 176 riders from 27 nationalities started the race, with France having the largest contingent (32 riders).

UCI WorldTeams

- Alpecin–Deceuninck
- Arkéa–B&B Hotels
- Astana Qazaqstan Team
- Cofidis
- Decathlon–AG2R La Mondiale
- EF Education–EasyPost
- Groupama–FDJ
- INEOS Grenadiers
- Intermarché–Wanty
- Lidl–Trek
- Movistar Team
- Red Bull–Bora–Hansgrohe
- Soudal–Quick-Step
- Team Bahrain Victorious
- Team dsm–firmenich PostNL
- Team Jayco–AlUla
- Visma–Lease a Bike
- UAE Team Emirates

UCI ProTeams

- Israel–Premier Tech
- Lotto–Dstny
- Team TotalEnergies
- Uno-X Mobility

== Route and stages ==
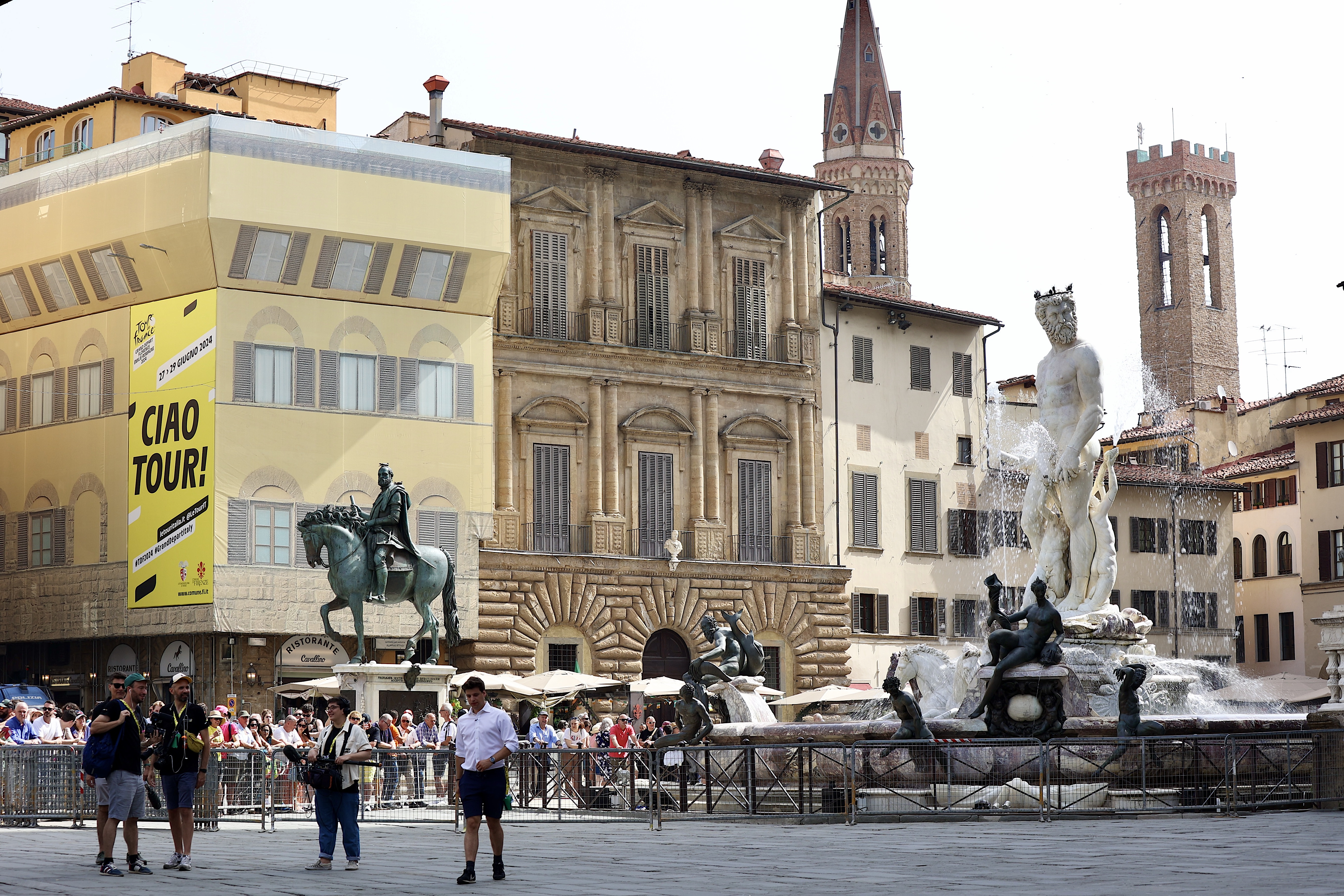
Florence in Italy hosted the start of the Tour.

Italy hosted the Grand Départ for the first time. 2024 is the 100th anniversary of the first Italian victory in the Tour, won by Ottavio Bottecchia in 1924. The route also visited the microstate of San Marino, making it the 14th country to be visited by a Tour stage. The race did not finish in Paris, owing to preparations for the Paris 2024 Olympic and Paralympic Games, which started on 26 July. Instead, the tour finished in Nice with an individual time trial—the last time a time trial was the final stage in the Tour was in 1989. In October 2023, Christian Prudhomme announced the full route. The route was described as "tough" by riders, with particular concern for the gravel tracks on stage 9 and limited opportunities for sprinters.

Stage characteristics
Stage	Date	Course	Distance	Type	Winner
1	29 June	Florence (Italy) to Rimini (Italy)	206 km (128 mi)	Hilly stage	Romain Bardet (FRA)
2	30 June	Cesenatico (Italy) to Bologna (Italy)	199.2 km (123.8 mi)	Hilly stage	Kévin Vauquelin (FRA)
3	1 July	Piacenza (Italy) to Turin (Italy)	230.8 km (143.4 mi)	Flat stage	Biniam Girmay (ERI)
4	2 July	Pinerolo (Italy) to Valloire	139.6 km (86.7 mi)	Mountain stage	Tadej Pogačar (SLO)
5	3 July	Saint-Jean-de-Maurienne to Saint-Vulbas	177.4 km (110.2 mi)	Flat stage	Mark Cavendish (GBR)
6	4 July	Mâcon to Dijon	163.5 km (101.6 mi)	Flat stage	Dylan Groenewegen (NED)
7	5 July	Nuits-Saint-Georges to Gevrey-Chambertin	25.3 km (15.7 mi)	Individual time trial	Remco Evenepoel (BEL)
8	6 July	Semur-en-Auxois to Colombey-les-Deux-Églises	183.4 km (114.0 mi)	Flat stage	Biniam Girmay (ERI)
9	7 July	Troyes to Troyes	199 km (124 mi)	Hilly stage	Anthony Turgis (FRA)
	8 July	Orléans	Rest day		
10	9 July	Orléans to Saint-Amand-Montrond	187.3 km (116.4 mi)	Flat stage	Jasper Philipsen (BEL)
11	10 July	Évaux-les-Bains to Le Lioran	211 km (131 mi)	Mountain stage	Jonas Vingegaard (DEN)
12	11 July	Aurillac to Villeneuve-sur-Lot	203.6 km (126.5 mi)	Flat stage	Biniam Girmay (ERI)
13	12 July	Agen to Pau	165.3 km (102.7 mi)	Flat stage	Jasper Philipsen (BEL)
14	13 July	Pau to Saint-Lary-Soulan (Pla d'Adet)	151.9 km (94.4 mi)	Mountain stage	Tadej Pogačar (SLO)
15	14 July	Loudenvielle to Plateau de Beille	197.7 km (122.8 mi)	Mountain stage	Tadej Pogačar (SLO)
	15 July	Gruissan	Rest day		
16	16 July	Gruissan to Nîmes	188.6 km (117.2 mi)	Flat stage	Jasper Philipsen (BEL)
17	17 July	Saint-Paul-Trois-Châteaux to SuperDévoluy	177.8 km (110.5 mi)	Mountain stage	Richard Carapaz (ECU)
18	18 July	Gap to Barcelonnette	179.5 km (111.5 mi)	Hilly stage	Victor Campenaerts (BEL)
19	19 July	Embrun to Isola 2000	144.6 km (89.9 mi)	Mountain stage	Tadej Pogačar (SLO)
20	20 July	Nice to Col de la Couillole	132.8 km (82.5 mi)	Mountain stage	Tadej Pogačar (SLO)
21	21 July	Monaco to Nice	33.7 km (20.9 mi)	Individual time trial	Tadej Pogačar (SLO)
Total			3,498 km (2,174 mi)		

== Pre-race favorites ==
Analysts forecasting the 2024 Tour de France generally focused on four main contenders, sometimes nicknamed the Big Four: Tadej Pogačar, Jonas Vingegaard, Primož Roglič, and Remco Evenepoel. Pogačar was coming off the 2024 Giro d'Italia, where he won in dominant fashion, leading by nearly 10 minutes and winning six stages. However, no rider had completed the Giro-Tour double since Marco Pantani in 1998, and some analysts doubted whether Pogačar could maintain form through two Grand Tours. Vingegaard, the two-time reigning champion, was an unknown, as he had crashed heavily at the 2024 Tour of the Basque Country in April. Vingegaard suffered a punctured lung, among other injuries, and had not raced since, although he had recovered enough for a month long altitude camp leading up to the Tour. Roglič and Evenepoel had been caught in the same crash while riding the Tour of the Basque Country, but had recovered enough to ride the 2024 Critérium du Dauphiné. Roglič won the overall, though only by 8 seconds, while Evenepoel won the time trial on stage 3. While these four riders were generally seen as the top favorites for the overall win and podium, other riders mentioned in contention for the general classification were Carlos Rodriguez, Adam Yates, João Almeida, and Matteo Jorgenson.

For the points classification, Jasper Philipsen was seen as a favorite, having won four stages and the points jersey the previous year. Other potential challengers for sprint finishes were Mark Cavendish, Mads Pedersen, Sam Bennett, and Biniam Girmay.

== Race overview ==
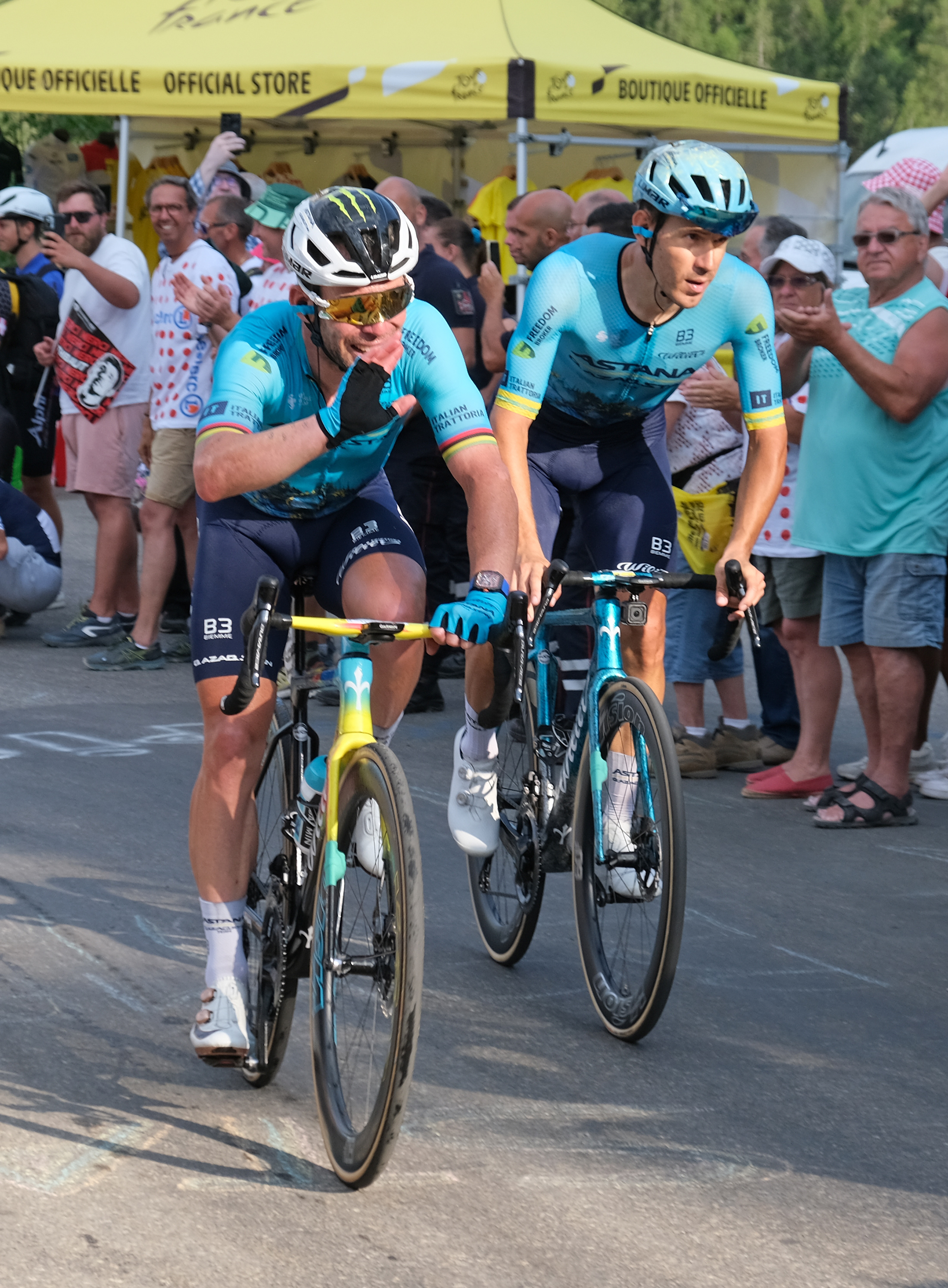
Mark Cavendish (pictured here on stage 20) won stage 5 on his last Tour de France.

=== Grand Départ and the first week ===
The first stage, dedicated to Marco Pantani, left Florence in Italy on 29 June. 50 km (31 mi) from the finish line in Rimini, French rider Romain Bardet broke away from the leader's group with his teammate Frank van den Broek and held onto a slim lead on the peloton for the remainder of the race. It was the first time Bardet had earned the right to wear the yellow jersey, in what he had announced would be his final season on the tour.

Another Frenchman, Kévin Vauquelin, won the second stage, distancing rivals in the final 1.9 km (1.2 mi) climb (10.6% grade) up to the sanctuary of the Madonna di San Luca in Bologna. Nevertheless, it was Tadej Pogačar who finished the day with the yellow jersey, distancing Romain Bardet in the final ascent, with only Jonas Vingegaard keeping pace.

The longest stage of the tour took place the following day on a flat route through the Piedmont countryside. After 165 kilometres (103 mi), another French rider, Fabien Grellier, attempted a breakaway, only to be caught by the peloton in under half an hour. The final sprint in Turin to reach the finish line caused a jumbled-up crash, which hurt the chances of some of the sprinters. The Eritrean rider Biniam Girmay crossed the finish line first, becoming the first Black African to win a stage on the Tour. The reigning Olympic road race champion Richard Carapaz finished the day atop the overall standings, becoming the first Ecuadorian to wear the Tour's yellow jersey.

On stage 4, the race entered France for the first time, with the stage including the climb of the Col du Galibier. Tadej Pogačar's UAE team-mates controlled the pace, laying the foundation for a Pogačar attack about 900 metres (3,000 ft) from the summit. Only Jonas Vingegaard was initially able to keep up with Pogačar, but reached the summit eight seconds behind him. Over the remaining 18 kilometres (11 mi) to Valloire, Pogačar extended the gap, eventually crossing the finish line 35 seconds ahead of Remco Evenepoel, Juan Ayuso and Primož Roglič, with Vingegaard a further two seconds back. Time bonuses gained on the Galibier and at the finish meant Pogačar held a 45-second overall lead over Evenepoel with Vingegaard third at 50 seconds.

The next stage, from Saint-Jean-de-Maurienne to Saint-Vulbas, was a return to flat terrain. It was won by sprinter Mark Cavendish, taking his 35th Tour de France stage win – the most in the Tour history, passing Eddy Merckx, with whom he had been tied since 2021. Tadej Pogačar maintained his lead overall. A windy stage 6 through the Burgundy vineyards from Mâcon to Dijon was won by a tire-width by Dylan Groenewegen in a sprint finish, while Pogačar maintained his overall lead.

Stage 7 was a 25.3 km (15.7 mi) individual time trial from Nuits-Saint-Georges to Gevrey-Chambertin, won by world time trial champion Remco Evenepoel, 12 seconds ahead of Tadej Pogačar. In the general classification, there was no change in the top three positions: Pogačar led from Evenepoel and Vingegaard.

=== Week two ===
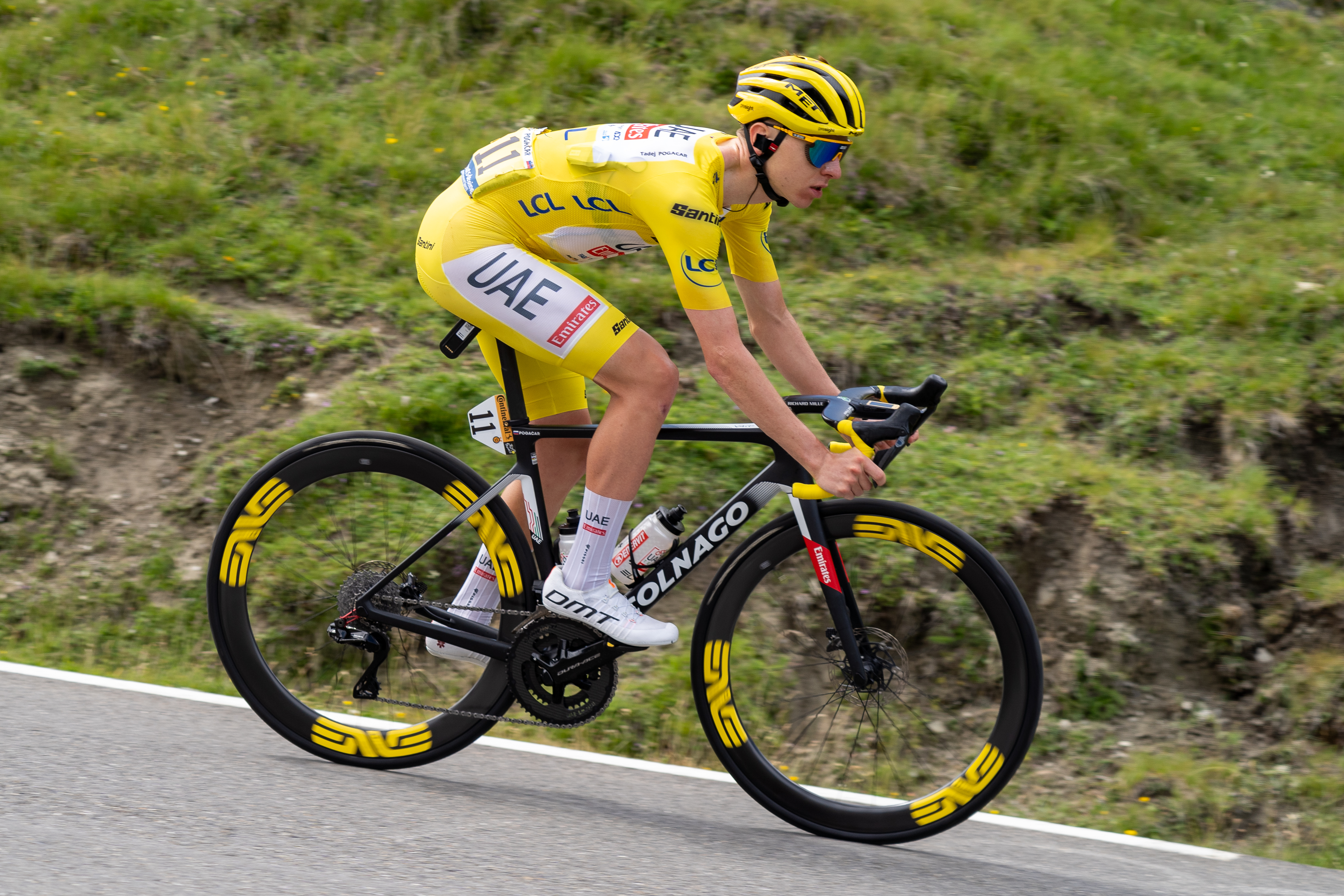
Tadej Pogačar in the yellow jersey on stage 14 descending the Col du Tourmalet

Stage 8 was 183.4 km (114.0 mi) from Semur-en-Auxois to Colombey-les-Deux-Églises. A breakaway by mountains classification leader Jonas Abrahamsen was reeled in by the peloton with 5km remaining. In the subsequent sprint, Biniam Girmay took his second stage win of the race, followed by Jasper Philipsen and Arnaud De Lie. There was no change in standings for the overall lead.

7 July saw a chaotic stage 9, 199 km (124 mi) with multiple sections of gravel road near Troyes. A breakaway group was successful, with Frenchman Anthony Turgis winning the stage, Tom Pidcock coming second and Derek Gee third. Pogačar attacked his rivals in the general classification but their positions did not change. This stage was followed by a rest day.

Stage 10 ended in a bunched sprint finish in Saint-Amand-Montrond after a 187.3 km (116.4 mi) race from Orléans. Jasper Philipsen won the stage, beating Girmay (wearing the green jersey) and Pascal Ackermann to the line, with no changes to the leaders in the overall standings.

In contrast, stage 11 saw a major shake-up among the leading contenders. Described as the toughest stage of the Tour so far, the mountainous route ran for 211 km (131 mi) from Évaux-les-Bains to Le Lioran. Overall leader Pogačar instigated a long-range solo attack 600m from a summit at Puy Mary, but Jonas Vingegaard caught Pogačar, while Roglič crashed on a damp hairpin bend. Vingegaard out-sprinted Pogačar at the finish in the Massif Central. It was Vingegaard's first stage win of the 2024 Tour; he had sustained life-threatening injuries in April's Tour of the Basque Country. Evenepoel and Roglič finished together in joint third, 25 seconds behind the leading pair, and 1m 47s ahead of a group of five led by Giulio Ciccone.

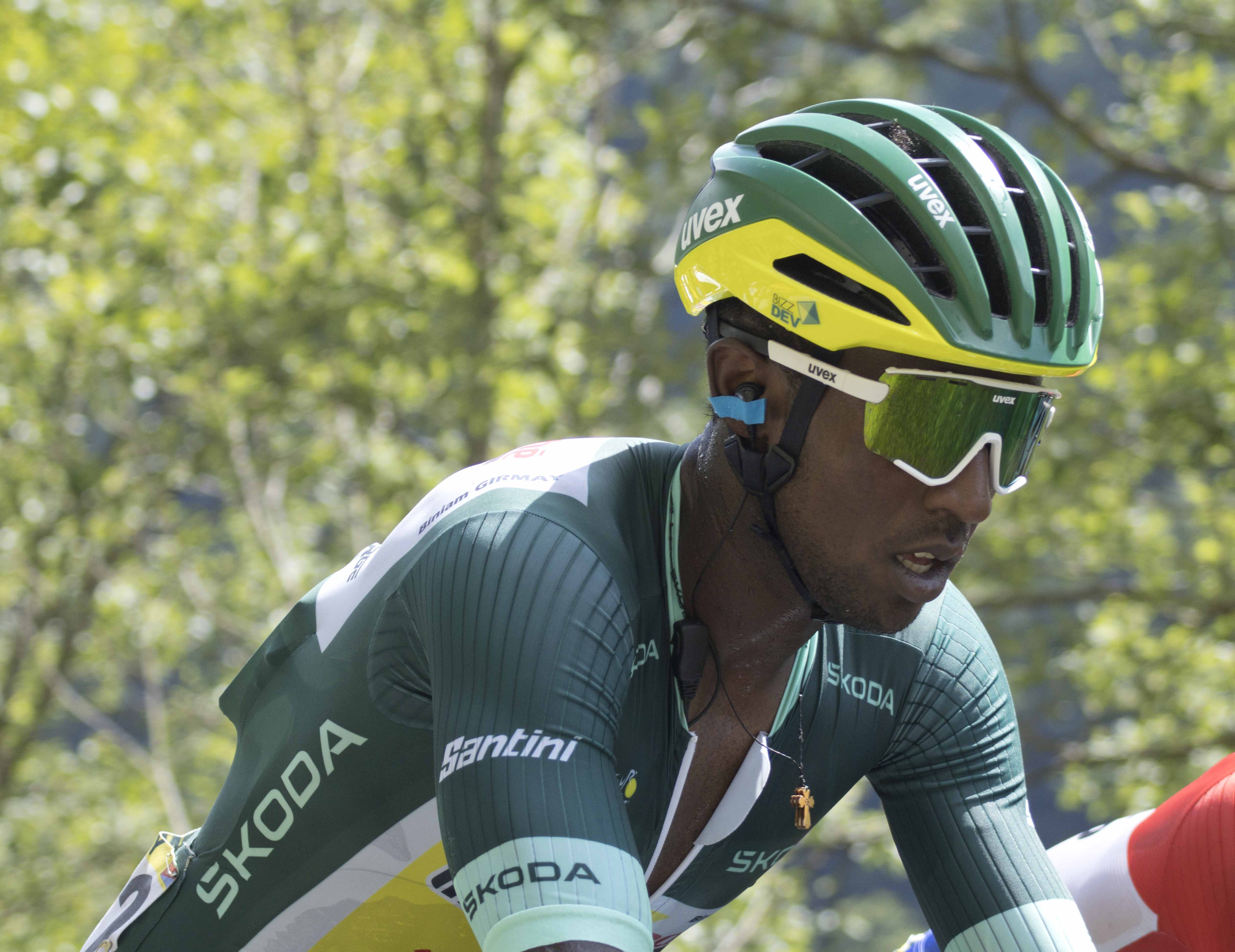
Biniam Girmay in the green jersey of the points classification on stage 15

Stages 12 and 13 both concluded with controversial sprint finishes. After 203.6 km (126.5 mi) from Aurillac to Villeneuve-sur-Lot, Girmay took his third stage win in 11 days on a hot stage 12 ahead of Wout van Aert and Ackerman. Cavendish was demoted from fifth place by the race jury for "deviation from the chosen line, that obstructs or endangers another rider". Roglič crashed in the bunch 11km from the end of the stage, finishing 2min 15sec behind and dropping to sixth overall, 4min 42sec behind Pogačar. Overnight, Roglič retired from the race due to his injuries. Stage 13, 165.3 km (102.7 mi) from Agen to Pau, was won by Philipsen from van Aert, Ackerman and Girmay. Philipsen was criticised by his rivals; Ackermann refused to shake Philipsen's hand after the stage, insisting he should be punished by the officials for the same offence as Cavendish had been.

Stage 14, 151.9 km (94.4 mi) from Pau to Saint-Lary-Soulan (Pla d'Adet) in the Hautes Pyrenees, saw Pogačar increase his lead in the general classification. He finished 39 seconds ahead of Vingegaard, having made a solo attack just under five kilometres from the high-altitude ski station finish. Evenepoel finished third, a further 31 seconds behind Vingegaard. It was the ninth time that Pogačar and Vingegaard had finished first and second in a Tour stage. In the overall standings, Vingegaard took second place from Evenepoel, who slipped to third. The same three riders finished in the same order on stage 15 on 14 July, 197.7 km (122.8 mi) from Loudenvielle to a summit finish at Plateau de Beille. Pogačar broke away from Vingegaard with around 5km of the stage remaining, setting a time of 39min 41sec for the ascent, eclipsing Marco Pantani's record for the same course set in 1998 (43min 20sec). Pogačar's overall lead over Vingegaard increased to more than three minutes, with Evenepoel five minutes behind.

=== Week three ===
After a rest day in Gruissan, stage 16 on 16 July was 188.6 km (117.2 mi) from Gruissan to Nîmes. The leading riders remained in the peloton until a sprint finish, in which Philipsen won his third stage. This matched the number of stage wins by fellow sprinter and green jersey leader Girmay, who crashed on the run-in to the finish. There was no change in the overall standings.

Stage 17 was a mountain stage, 177.8 km (110.5 mi) in Superdévoluy. British rider Simon Yates attacked on the day's toughest climb, the Col du Noyer, but was caught by Carapaz. Carapaz eventually left Yates behind, finishing first by 37 seconds, with Enric Mas a further 20 seconds back in third. Pogačar made a small attack but it only served to help third overall Evenepoel win back a few seconds in the general classification against a faltering Vingegaard.

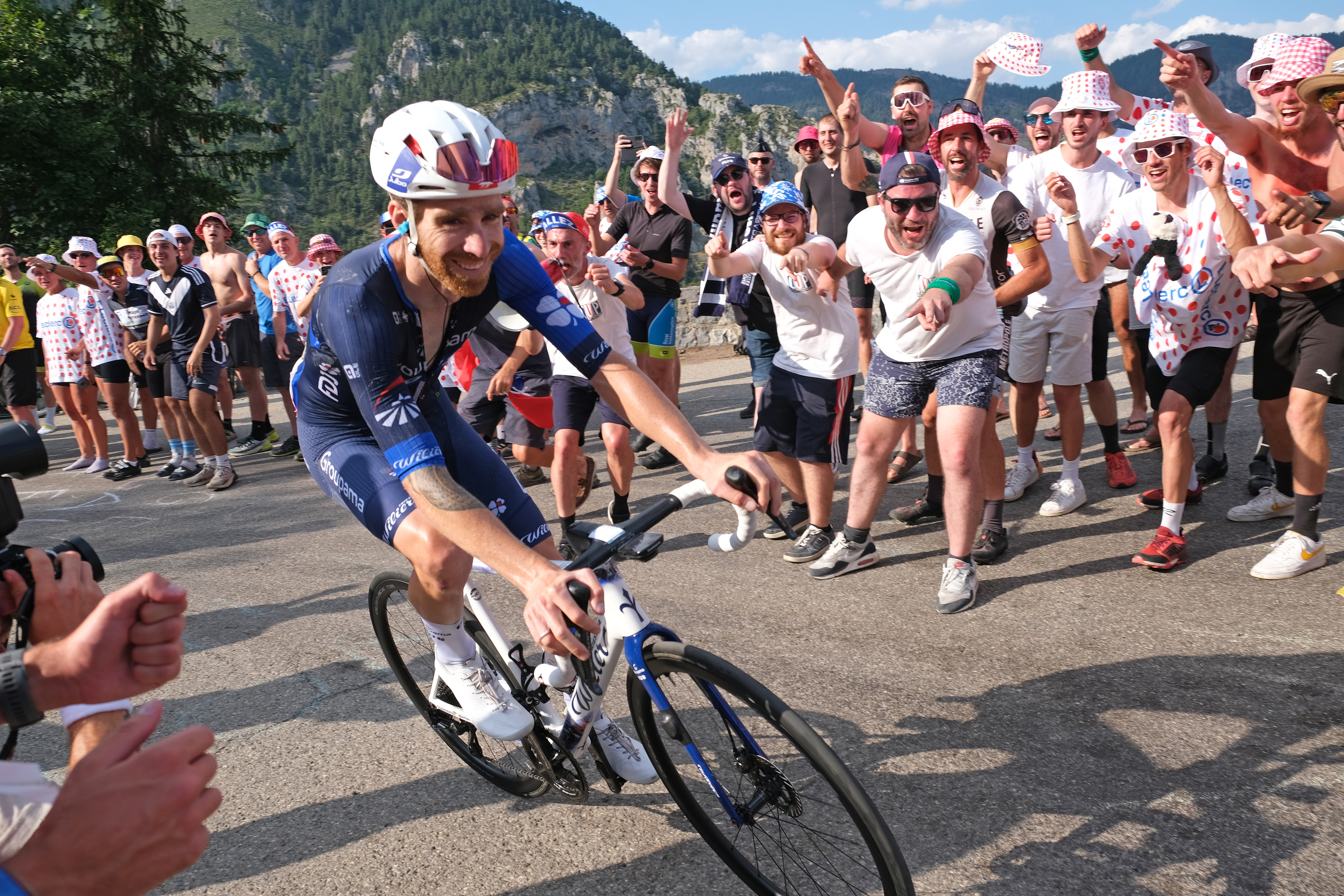
Spectators, some of them from the Thibaut Pinot supporter group, cheering for French rider Quentin Pacher on stage 20.

The 179.5 km (111.5 mi) stage 18 from Gap to Barcelonnette saw a successful breakaway by three riders: Victor Campenaerts, French rider Mattéo Vercher and former world champion Michał Kwiatkowski, who finished in that order. The leading positions in the overall standings remained unchanged. Pogačar dominated the final three stages, winning all of them. Stages 19 and 20 were both Alpine mountain stages. Carapaz participated in a breakaway on stage 19, which earned him the King of the Mountains jersey for the first time. However Carapaz, Simon Yates, and Matteo Jorgenson were overtaken by Pogačar on the final climb to Isola 2000 in the Mercantour Alps. It was Pogačar's tenth stage win in 2024 Grand Tours, and extended his overall lead to more than five minutes. Stage 20 the following day was the race's final mountain stage, finishing up the Col de la Couillole in the Alpes Maritimes. Pogačar won again, ahead of Vingegaard who finished second.

The Tour's final stage was a 33.7 km (20.9 mi) individual time trial from Monaco to Nice on 21 July. Pogačar beat both Vingegaard and young rider classification winner Evenepoel by over a minute, taking overall victory by more than six minutes. It was the first time since Marco Pantani in 1998 that the same rider had won both the Giro d'Italia and Tour de France in the same year. Pogačar's UAE Team Emirates won the team classification.

== Classification leadership ==
Classification leadership by stage
Stage	Winner	General classification	Points classification	Mountains classification	Young rider classification	Team classification	Combativity award
1	Romain Bardet	Romain Bardet	Frank van den Broek	Jonas Abrahamsen (Note: On stages 3 and 4, Valentin Madouas, who was second in the mountains classification, wore the polka dot jersey, because first-placed Jonas Abrahamsen wore the green jersey as the leader of the points classification. Madouas also wore the polka dot jersey on stage 5 when third in the mountains classification, as first-placed Abrahamsen continued to wear the green jersey of points classification leader and second-placed Tadej Pogačar wore the yellow jersey as general classification leader.)	Frank van den Broek (Note: On stage 2, Maxim Van Gils, who was second in the young rider classification, wore the white jersey, because first-placed Frank van den Broek wore the green jersey as the leader of the points classification.)	Team dsm–firmenich PostNL	Frank van den Broek
2	Kévin Vauquelin	Tadej Pogačar	Jonas Abrahamsen	Jonas Abrahamsen	Remco Evenepoel	Movistar Team	Jonas Abrahamsen
3	Biniam Girmay	Richard Carapaz	Jonas Abrahamsen	Jonas Abrahamsen	Remco Evenepoel	Movistar Team	Fabien Grellier
4	Tadej Pogačar	Tadej Pogačar	Jonas Abrahamsen	Jonas Abrahamsen	Remco Evenepoel	UAE Team Emirates	Oier Lazkano
5	Mark Cavendish	Tadej Pogačar	Biniam Girmay	Jonas Abrahamsen	Remco Evenepoel	UAE Team Emirates	Clément Russo
6	Dylan Groenewegen	Tadej Pogačar	Biniam Girmay	Jonas Abrahamsen	Remco Evenepoel	UAE Team Emirates	Mads Pedersen
7	Remco Evenepoel	Tadej Pogačar	Biniam Girmay	Jonas Abrahamsen	Remco Evenepoel	UAE Team Emirates	no award
8	Biniam Girmay	Tadej Pogačar	Biniam Girmay	Jonas Abrahamsen	Remco Evenepoel	UAE Team Emirates	Jonas Abrahamsen
9	Anthony Turgis	Tadej Pogačar	Biniam Girmay	Jonas Abrahamsen	Remco Evenepoel	UAE Team Emirates	Jasper Stuyven
10	Jasper Philipsen	Tadej Pogačar	Biniam Girmay	Jonas Abrahamsen	Remco Evenepoel	UAE Team Emirates	Kobe Goossens
11	Jonas Vingegaard	Tadej Pogačar	Biniam Girmay	Tadej Pogačar (Note: From stages 12 to 19, the rider in second place in the mountains classification wore the polka dot jersey as Tadej Pogačar led both the general and mountains classifications, so was wearing the yellow jersey. On stages 12 to 14, the polka dot jersey was worn by Jonas Abrahamsen and on stages 15 to 19 by Jonas Vingegaard.)	Remco Evenepoel	UAE Team Emirates	Tadej Pogačar
12	Biniam Girmay	Tadej Pogačar	Biniam Girmay	Tadej Pogačar	Remco Evenepoel	UAE Team Emirates	Quentin Pacher
13	Jasper Philipsen	Tadej Pogačar	Biniam Girmay	Tadej Pogačar	Remco Evenepoel	UAE Team Emirates	Magnus Cort
14	Tadej Pogačar	Tadej Pogačar	Biniam Girmay	Tadej Pogačar	Remco Evenepoel	UAE Team Emirates	Ben Healy
15	Tadej Pogačar	Tadej Pogačar	Biniam Girmay	Tadej Pogačar	Remco Evenepoel	UAE Team Emirates	Richard Carapaz
16	Jasper Philipsen	Tadej Pogačar	Biniam Girmay	Tadej Pogačar	Remco Evenepoel	UAE Team Emirates	Thomas Gachignard
17	Richard Carapaz	Tadej Pogačar	Biniam Girmay	Tadej Pogačar	Remco Evenepoel	UAE Team Emirates	Romain Grégoire
18	Victor Campenaerts	Tadej Pogačar	Biniam Girmay	Tadej Pogačar	Remco Evenepoel	UAE Team Emirates	Tobias Halland Johannessen
19	Tadej Pogačar	Tadej Pogačar	Biniam Girmay	Richard Carapaz	Remco Evenepoel	UAE Team Emirates	Richard Carapaz
20	Tadej Pogačar	Tadej Pogačar	Biniam Girmay	Richard Carapaz	Remco Evenepoel	UAE Team Emirates	Enric Mas
21	Tadej Pogačar	Tadej Pogačar	Biniam Girmay	Richard Carapaz	Remco Evenepoel	UAE Team Emirates	no award
Final		Tadej Pogačar	Biniam Girmay	Richard Carapaz	Remco Evenepoel	UAE Team Emirates	Richard Carapaz

== Classification standings ==
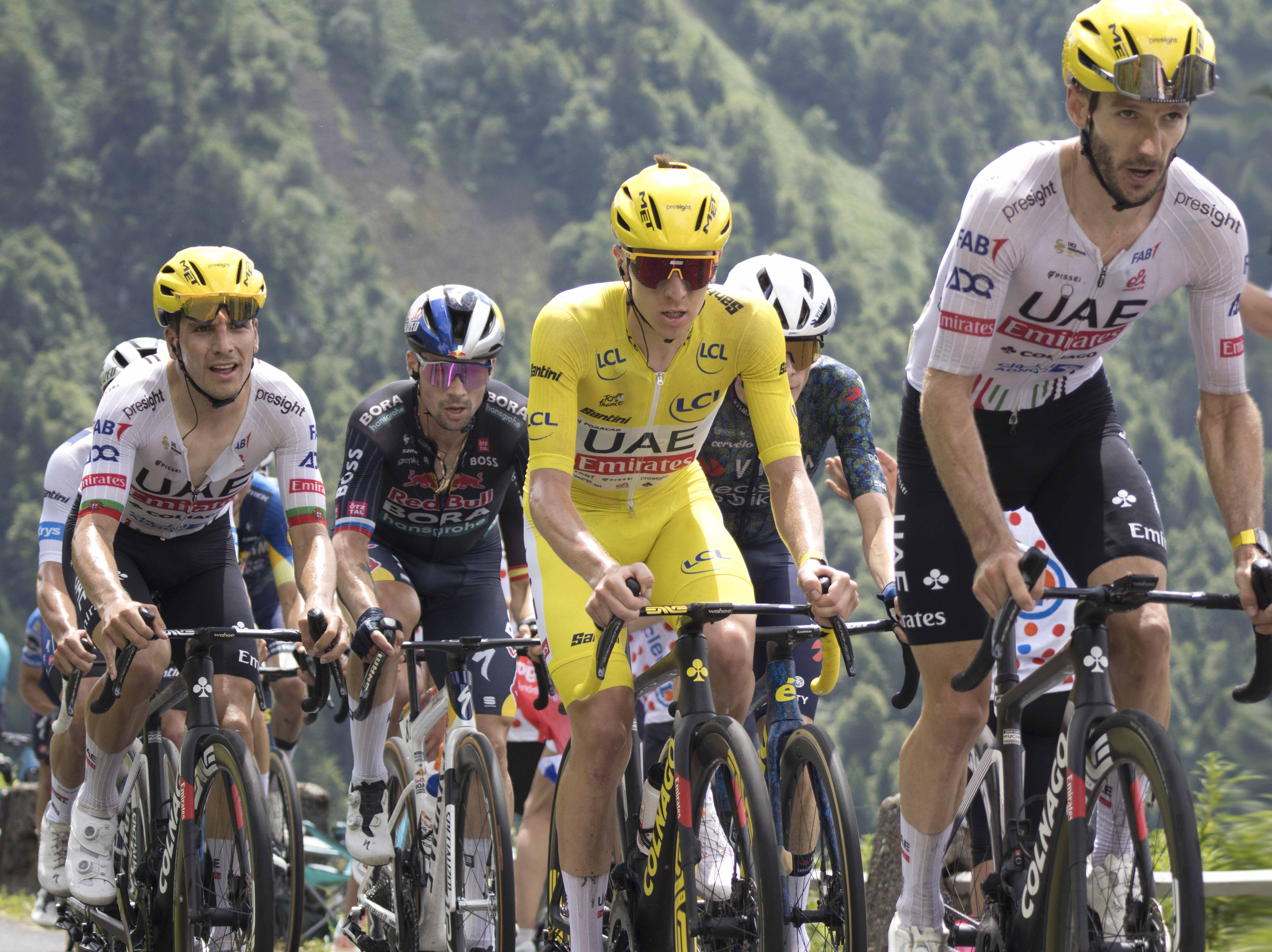
Winner of the 2024 Tour de France Tadej Pogačar, being led by his UAE Team Emirates teammates on stage 11

Legend
Denotes the winner of the general classification	Denotes the winner of the mountains classification
Denotes the winner of the points classification	Denotes the winner of the young rider classification
Denotes the winner of the team classification	Denotes the winner of the combativity award

=== General classification ===
Final general classification (1–10)
Rank	Rider	Team	Time
1	Tadej Pogačar (SLO)	UAE Team Emirates	83h 38' 56"
2	Jonas Vingegaard (DEN)	Visma–Lease a Bike	+ 6' 17"
3	Remco Evenepoel (BEL)	Soudal–Quick-Step	+ 9' 18"
4	João Almeida (POR)	UAE Team Emirates	+ 19' 03"
5	Mikel Landa (ESP)	Soudal–Quick-Step	+ 20' 06"
6	Adam Yates (GBR)	UAE Team Emirates	+ 24' 07"
7	Carlos Rodríguez (ESP)	INEOS Grenadiers	+ 25' 04"
8	Matteo Jorgenson (USA)	Visma–Lease a Bike	+ 26' 34"
9	Derek Gee (CAN)	Israel–Premier Tech	+ 27' 21"
10	Santiago Buitrago (COL)	Team Bahrain Victorious	+ 29' 03"

Final general classification (11–141)
Rank	Rider	Team	Time
11	Giulio Ciccone (ITA)	Lidl–Trek	+ 30' 42"
12	Simon Yates (GBR)	Team Jayco–AlUla	+ 39' 04"
13	Guillaume Martin (FRA)	Cofidis	+ 43' 49"
14	Felix Gall (AUT)	Decathlon–AG2R La Mondiale	+ 46' 12"
15	Laurens De Plus (BEL)	INEOS Grenadiers	+ 46' 24"
16	Steff Cras (BEL)	Team TotalEnergies	+ 49' 18"
17	Richard Carapaz (ECU)	EF Education–EasyPost	+ 49' 24"
18	Jai Hindley (AUS)	Red Bull–Bora–Hansgrohe	+ 57' 04"
19	Enric Mas (ESP)	Movistar Team	+ 1h 11' 05"
20	Louis Meintjes (RSA)	Intermarché–Wanty	+ 1h 11' 50"
21	Wilco Kelderman (NED)	Visma–Lease a Bike	+ 1h 23' 11"
22	Julien Bernard (FRA)	Lidl–Trek	+ 1h 37' 15"
23	Javier Romo (ESP)	Movistar Team	+ 1h 42' 26"
24	Carlos Verona (ESP)	Lidl–Trek	+ 1h 47' 13"
25	Valentin Madouas (FRA)	Groupama–FDJ	+ 1h 51' 59"
26	Ilan Van Wilder (BEL)	Soudal–Quick-Step	+ 1h 54' 30"
27	Ben Healy (IRL)	EF Education–EasyPost	+ 1h 56' 12"
28	Jordan Jegat (FRA)	Team TotalEnergies	+ 2h 02' 36"
29	Egan Bernal (COL)	INEOS Grenadiers	+ 2h 03' 50"
30	Romain Bardet (FRA)	Team dsm–firmenich PostNL	+ 2h 04' 25"
31	Jack Haig (AUS)	Team Bahrain Victorious	+ 2h 11' 33"
32	Pavel Sivakov (FRA)	UAE Team Emirates	+ 2h 14' 21"
33	Bruno Armirail (FRA)	Decathlon–AG2R La Mondiale	+ 2h 15' 39"
34	Odd Christian Eiking (NOR)	Uno-X Mobility	+ 2h 18' 34"
35	Tobias Halland Johannessen (NOR)	Uno-X Mobility	+ 2h 21' 37"
36	Cristián Rodríguez (ESP)	Arkéa–B&B Hotels	+ 2h 26' 59"
37	Bob Jungels (LUX)	Red Bull–Bora–Hansgrohe	+ 2h 29' 05"
38	Jakob Fuglsang (DEN)	Israel–Premier Tech	+ 2h 31' 42"
39	Oscar Onley (GBR)	Team dsm–firmenich PostNL	+ 2h 41' 39"
40	Warren Barguil (FRA)	Team dsm–firmenich PostNL	+ 2h 42' 13"
41	Romain Grégoire (FRA)	Groupama–FDJ	+ 2h 43' 41"
42	Geraint Thomas (GBR)	INEOS Grenadiers	+ 2h 47' 36"
43	Wout Poels (NED)	Team Bahrain Victorious	+ 2h 54' 52"
44	Marc Soler (ESP)	UAE Team Emirates	+ 2h 55' 47"
45	Toms Skujiņš (LAT)	Lidl–Trek	+ 2h 57' 02"
46	Quentin Pacher (FRA)	Groupama–FDJ	+ 3h 15' 07"
47	Johannes Kulset (NOR)	Uno-X Mobility	+ 3h 17' 42"
48	Nicolas Prodhomme (FRA)	Decathlon–AG2R La Mondiale	+ 3h 19' 25"
49	Tiesj Benoot (BEL)	Visma–Lease a Bike	+ 3h 26' 11"
50	Hugo Houle (CAN)	Israel–Premier Tech	+ 3h 26' 55"
51	Nelson Oliveira (POR)	Movistar Team	+ 3h 33' 54"
52	Wout van Aert (BEL)	Visma–Lease a Bike	+ 3h 35' 56"
53	Jonathan Castroviejo (ESP)	INEOS Grenadiers	+ 3h 35' 58"
54	Michał Kwiatkowski (POL)	INEOS Grenadiers	+ 3h 36' 34"
55	Jonas Abrahamsen (NOR)	Uno-X Mobility	+ 3h 38' 58"
56	Gregor Mühlberger (AUT)	Movistar Team	+ 3h 40' 17"
57	Magnus Cort (DEN)	Uno-X Mobility	+ 3h 41' 57"
58	Kevin Geniets (LUX)	Groupama–FDJ	+ 3h 44' 19"
59	Neilson Powless (USA)	EF Education–EasyPost	+ 3h 45' 24"
60	Matteo Sobrero (ITA)	Red Bull–Bora–Hansgrohe	+ 3h 46' 46"
61	Jasper Stuyven (BEL)	Lidl–Trek	+ 3h 47' 39"
62	Frank van den Broek (NED)	Team dsm–firmenich PostNL	+ 3h 48' 02"
63	Mathieu Burgaudeau (FRA)	Team TotalEnergies	+ 3h 48' 17"
64	Jan Tratnik (SLO)	Visma–Lease a Bike	+ 3h 48' 34"
65	David Gaudu (FRA)	Groupama–FDJ	+ 3h 49' 23"
66	Krists Neilands (LAT)	Israel–Premier Tech	+ 3h 52' 08"
67	Jan Hirt (CZE)	Soudal–Quick-Step	+ 3h 54' 00"
68	Rui Costa (POR)	EF Education–EasyPost	+ 3h 54' 10"
69	Kobe Goossens (BEL)	Intermarché–Wanty	+ 3h 56' 05"
70	Bart Lemmen (NED)	Visma–Lease a Bike	+ 3h 56' 28"
71	Alex Aranburu (ESP)	Movistar Team	+ 3h 57' 53"
72	Davide Formolo (ITA)	Movistar Team	+ 3h 59' 41"
73	Stephen Williams (GBR)	Israel–Premier Tech	+ 3h 59' 57"
74	Harold Tejada (COL)	Astana Qazaqstan Team	+ 4h 00' 13"
75	Nils Politt (GER)	UAE Team Emirates	+ 4h 03' 21"
76	Nans Peters (FRA)	Decathlon–AG2R La Mondiale	+ 4h 07' 39"
77	Georg Zimmermann (GER)	Intermarché–Wanty	+ 4h 07' 59"
78	Sean Quinn (USA)	EF Education–EasyPost	+ 4h 10' 38"
79	Oier Lazkano (ESP)	Movistar Team	+ 4h 10' 41"
80	Tim Wellens (BEL)	UAE Team Emirates	+ 4h 20' 49"
81	Victor Campenaerts (BEL)	Lotto–Dstny	+ 4h 23' 21"
82	Dorian Godon (FRA)	Decathlon–AG2R La Mondiale	+ 4h 23' 27"
83	Oliver Naesen (BEL)	Decathlon–AG2R La Mondiale	+ 4h 23' 43"
84	Christophe Laporte (FRA)	Visma–Lease a Bike	+ 4h 26' 27"
85	Marco Haller (AUT)	Red Bull–Bora–Hansgrohe	+ 4h 26' 52"
86	Gianni Moscon (ITA)	Soudal–Quick-Step	+ 4h 26' 54"
87	Ryan Gibbons (RSA)	Lidl–Trek	+ 4h 28' 44"
88	Paul Lapeira (FRA)	Decathlon–AG2R La Mondiale	+ 4h 28' 54"
89	Michael Matthews (AUS)	Team Jayco–AlUla	+ 4h 30' 03"
90	Fabien Grellier (FRA)	Team TotalEnergies	+ 4h 33' 40"
91	Kévin Vauquelin (FRA)	Arkéa–B&B Hotels	+ 4h 33' 56"
92	Thomas Gachignard (FRA)	Team TotalEnergies	+ 4h 38' 30"
93	Mike Teunissen (NED)	Intermarché–Wanty	+ 4h 40' 14"
94	Simon Geschke (GER)	Cofidis	+ 4h 40' 30"
95	Brent Van Moer (BEL)	Lotto–Dstny	+ 4h 42' 29"
96	Mathieu van der Poel (NED)	Alpecin–Deceuninck	+ 4h 44' 05"
97	Christopher Juul-Jensen (DEN)	Team Jayco–AlUla	+ 4h 45' 12"
98	Raúl García Pierna (ESP)	Arkéa–B&B Hotels	+ 4h 46' 12"
99	Axel Laurance (FRA)	Alpecin–Deceuninck	+ 4h 46' 25"
100	Stefan Bissegger (SUI)	EF Education–EasyPost	+ 4h 46' 55"
101	Clément Champoussin (FRA)	Arkéa–B&B Hotels	+ 4h 49' 59"
102	Clément Russo (FRA)	Groupama–FDJ	+ 4h 51' 24"
103	Mattéo Vercher (FRA)	Team TotalEnergies	+ 4h 55' 14"
104	Bryan Coquard (FRA)	Cofidis	+ 4h 56' 46"
105	Rasmus Tiller (NOR)	Uno-X Mobility	+ 4h 56' 51"
106	Anthony Turgis (FRA)	Team TotalEnergies	+ 4h 59' 48"
107	Gianni Vermeersch (BEL)	Alpecin–Deceuninck	+ 5h 02' 07"
108	Axel Zingle (FRA)	Cofidis	+ 5h 04' 30"
109	Marijn van den Berg (NED)	EF Education–EasyPost	+ 5h 07' 55"
110	Nico Denz (GER)	Red Bull–Bora–Hansgrohe	+ 5h 08' 12"
111	Nikias Arndt (GER)	Team Bahrain Victorious	+ 5h 08' 28"
112	Pascal Ackermann (GER)	Israel–Premier Tech	+ 5h 10' 14"
113	Biniam Girmay (ERI)	Intermarché–Wanty	+ 5h 12' 47"
114	Piet Allegaert (BEL)	Cofidis	+ 5h 16' 14"
115	Ben Turner (GBR)	INEOS Grenadiers	+ 5h 17' 11"
116	Luka Mezgec (SLO)	Team Jayco–AlUla	+ 5h 17' 26"
117	Hugo Page (FRA)	Intermarché–Wanty	+ 5h 17' 59"
118	Laurenz Rex (BEL)	Intermarché–Wanty	+ 5h 18' 20"
119	Arnaud De Lie (BEL)	Lotto–Dstny	+ 5h 19' 56"
120	Danny van Poppel (NED)	Red Bull–Bora–Hansgrohe	+ 5h 22' 16"
121	Cedric Beullens (BEL)	Lotto–Dstny	+ 5h 23' 17"
122	John Degenkolb (GER)	Team dsm–firmenich PostNL	+ 5h 24' 08"
123	Luke Durbridge (AUS)	Team Jayco–AlUla	+ 5h 26' 37"
124	Lenny Martinez (FRA)	Groupama–FDJ	+ 5h 26' 45"
125	Yves Lampaert (BEL)	Soudal–Quick-Step	+ 5h 27' 51"
126	Silvan Dillier (SUI)	Alpecin–Deceuninck	+ 5h 31' 21"
127	Matej Mohorič (SLO)	Team Bahrain Victorious	+ 5h 33' 22"
128	Jasper Philipsen (BEL)	Alpecin–Deceuninck	+ 5h 34' 33"
129	Sébastien Grignard (BEL)	Lotto–Dstny	+ 5h 36' 52"
130	Harm Vanhoucke (BEL)	Lotto–Dstny	+ 5h 37' 11"
131	Alexander Kristoff (NOR)	Uno-X Mobility	+ 5h 39' 42"
132	Sandy Dujardin (FRA)	Team TotalEnergies	+ 5h 40' 58"
133	Søren Wærenskjold (NOR)	Uno-X Mobility	+ 5h 46' 24"
134	Robbe Ghys (BEL)	Alpecin–Deceuninck	+ 5h 55' 14"
135	Dylan Groenewegen (NED)	Team Jayco–AlUla	+ 5h 57' 41"
136	Daniel McLay (GBR)	Arkéa–B&B Hotels	+ 5h 58' 08"
137	Luca Mozzato (ITA)	Arkéa–B&B Hotels	+ 5h 59' 36"
138	Cees Bol (NED)	Astana Qazaqstan Team	+ 6h 08' 11"
139	Jarrad Drizners (AUS)	Lotto–Dstny	+ 6h 12' 21"
140	Davide Ballerini (ITA)	Astana Qazaqstan Team	+ 6h 22' 46"
141	Mark Cavendish (GBR)	Astana Qazaqstan Team	+ 6h 23' 11"

=== Points classification ===
Final points classification (1–10)
Rank	Rider	Team	Points
1	Biniam Girmay (ERI)	Intermarché–Wanty	387
2	Jasper Philipsen (BEL)	Alpecin–Deceuninck	354
3	Bryan Coquard (FRA)	Cofidis	208
4	Tadej Pogačar (SLO)	UAE Team Emirates	196
5	Anthony Turgis (FRA)	Team TotalEnergies	180
6	Arnaud De Lie (BEL)	Lotto–Dstny	161
7	Remco Evenepoel (BEL)	Soudal–Quick-Step	152
8	Wout van Aert (BEL)	Visma–Lease a Bike	152
9	Jonas Abrahamsen (NOR)	Uno-X Mobility	149
10	Jonas Vingegaard (DEN)	Visma–Lease a Bike	136

=== Mountains classification ===
Final mountains classification (1–10)
Rank	Rider	Team	Points
1	Richard Carapaz (ECU)	EF Education–EasyPost	127
2	Tadej Pogačar (SLO)	UAE Team Emirates	102
3	Jonas Vingegaard (DEN)	Visma–Lease a Bike	70
4	Matteo Jorgenson (USA)	Visma–Lease a Bike	54
5	Remco Evenepoel (BEL)	Soudal–Quick-Step	50
6	Wilco Kelderman (NED)	Visma–Lease a Bike	43
7	Oier Lazkano (ESP)	Movistar Team	41
8	Jonas Abrahamsen (NOR)	Uno-X Mobility	36
9	Enric Mas (ESP)	Movistar Team	33
10	David Gaudu (FRA)	Groupama–FDJ	30

=== Young rider classification ===
Final young rider classification (1–10)
Rank	Rider	Team	Time
1	Remco Evenepoel (BEL)	Soudal–Quick-Step	83h 48' 14"
2	Carlos Rodríguez (ESP)	INEOS Grenadiers	+ 15' 46"
3	Matteo Jorgenson (USA)	Visma–Lease a Bike	+ 17' 16"
4	Santiago Buitrago (COL)	Team Bahrain Victorious	+ 19' 45"
5	Javier Romo (ESP)	Movistar Team	+ 1h 33' 08"
6	Ilan Van Wilder (BEL)	Soudal–Quick-Step	+ 1h 45' 12"
7	Ben Healy (IRL)	EF Education–EasyPost	+ 1h 46' 54"
8	Jordan Jegat (FRA)	Team TotalEnergies	+ 1h 53' 18"
9	Tobias Halland Johannessen (NOR)	Uno-X Mobility	+ 2h 12' 19"
10	Oscar Onley (GBR)	Team dsm–firmenich PostNL	+ 2h 32' 21"

=== Team classification ===
Final team classification (1–10)
Rank	Team	Time
1	(United Arab Emirates) UAE Team Emirates	251h 36' 43"
2	(Netherlands) Visma–Lease a Bike	+ 31' 51"
3	(Belgium) Soudal–Quick-Step	+ 1h 33' 06"
4	(United Kingdom) INEOS Grenadiers	+ 1h 34' 05"
5	(United States) Lidl–Trek	+ 2h 33' 49"
6	(Spain) Movistar Team	+ 3h 10' 06"
7	Team Bahrain Victorious	+ 3h 38' 21"
8	(Germany) Red Bull–Bora–Hansgrohe	+ 3h 57' 23"
9	Israel–Premier Tech	+ 4h 01' 23"
10	(United States) EF Education–EasyPost	+ 4h 06' 54"

Preceded by 2024 Giro d'Italia	Grand Tour	Succeeded by 2024 Vuelta a España
