= Giovanni Battista Galliadi =

Italian painter

Giovanni Battista Galliadi (Sant'Arcangelo di Romagna, 1751–1811) was an Italian painter, mainly of portraits and genre subjects. He studied under Guido Reni.
