= 2022 Giro d'Italia, Stage 1 to Stage 11 =

Cycling race stages

The 2022 Giro d'Italia was the 105th edition of the Giro d'Italia, one of cycling's Grand Tours. The Giro began in Budapest on 6 May, and Stage 11 occurred on 18 May with a stage to Reggio Emilia. The race finished in Verona on 29 May.

== Classification standings ==
Legend
A pink jersey.	Denotes the leader of the general classification	A blue jersey.	Denotes the leader of the mountains classification
A violet jersey.	Denotes the leader of the points classification	A white jersey.	Denotes the leader of the young rider classification
A white jersey with a red number bib.	Denotes the winner of the combativity award		

== Stage 1 ==
6 May 2022 — Budapest (Hungary) to Visegrád (Hungary), 195 km (121 mi)

The first stage of the Giro featured an almost entirely flat parcours with a kick at the end. The first 189.3 kilometres (117.6 mi) were mostly flat while the final 5.7 kilometres (3.5 mi) featured a steady uphill climb to the finish at Visegrád. The first 2 kilometres (1.2 mi) of the climb averaged 2.6 per cent before kicking up to 5.1 per cent over the rest of the climb. The riders passed through the first intermediate sprint after 75.3 kilometres (46.8 mi), with the sprint offering points for the points classification. The last intermediate sprint took place after 167.5 kilometres (104.1 mi), with the sprint offering bonus seconds of 3, 2, and 1 to the first three riders across.

After the riders passed through the neutralised zone, two riders from Drone Hopper–Androni Giocattoli immediately jumped from the peloton as Mattia Bais and Filippo Tagliani comprised the day's breakaway. The duo would build an advantage of around 11 minutes before Alpecin–Fenix, EF Education–EasyPost, and Team DSM began to bring down the gap. After the duo up front took maximum points at the first intermediate sprint, the sprinters fought for the remaining points, with Giacomo Nizzolo (Israel–Premier Tech) taking third place. The break's advantage continued to dwindle over the rest of the day, with the gap hovering at just over a minute with 50 kilometres (31 mi) to go. At the intermediate sprint for bonus seconds, the Drone Hopper–Androni Giocattoli pair took the first two places before Thomas De Gendt (Lotto–Soudal) took the last bonus second. With 13.7 kilometres (8.5 mi) left, the pair up front was finally swept up by the peloton.

The battle for positions ahead of the final climb soon began after the break was caught. With 6 kilometres (3.7 mi) to go, as the pace increased, a crash took down Harm Vanhoucke (Lotto–Soudal), Jan Tratnik (Team Bahrain Victorious), and Erik Fetter (Eolo–Kometa); the three would eventually get back up. As the peloton hit the climb, the pace was steady before Lawrence Naesen (AG2R Citroën Team) launched an attack with 3.7 kilometres (2.3 mi) to go. INEOS Grenadiers led the chase while Davide Ballerini (Quick-Step Alpha Vinyl Team) crashed with 2.5 kilometres (1.6 mi) left. With 2.2 kilometres (1.4 mi) remaining, Lennard Kämna (Bora–Hansgrohe) accelerated from the peloton, immediately going past Naesen and building a lead of around 9 seconds. Intermarché–Wanty–Gobert Matériaux led the chase, with the peloton eventually catching Kämna inside the final kilometre. Once the catch was made, Davide Formolo (UAE Team Emirates) attacked but he was unable to build a significant gap. A sprint for the stage win ensued, with Mathieu van der Poel (Alpecin–Fenix), Biniam Girmay (Intermarché–Wanty–Gobert Matériaux), and Caleb Ewan (Lotto–Soudal) the main challengers for the win. After Van der Poel went past Girmay, Ewan's front wheel touched Girmay's back wheel, causing the Australian to go down; he would get back up and finish over a minute down. Van der Poel kept himself ahead of Girmay to take the stage win and the first maglia rosa. Pello Bilbao (Team Bahrain Victorious) took third while Richard Carapaz (INEOS Grenadiers) and Wilco Kelderman (Bora–Hansgrohe) also finished in the lead group, taking four seconds from some of the main GC contenders. With his win, Van der Poel also took the maglia ciclamino and the maglia azzurra as leader of the points and mountains classification, respectively, while Girmay took the white jersey as the best young rider.

Stage 1 Result
Rank	Rider	Team	Time
1	Mathieu van der Poel (NED)	Alpecin–Fenix	4h 35' 28"
2	Biniam Girmay (ERI)	Intermarché–Wanty–Gobert Matériaux	+ 0"
3	Pello Bilbao (ESP)	Team Bahrain Victorious	+ 0"
4	Magnus Cort (DEN)	EF Education–EasyPost	+ 0"
5	Wilco Kelderman (NED)	Bora–Hansgrohe	+ 0"
6	Richard Carapaz (ECU)	INEOS Grenadiers	+ 0"
7	Bauke Mollema (NED)	Trek–Segafredo	+ 0"
8	Diego Ulissi (ITA)	UAE Team Emirates	+ 0"
9	Andrea Vendrame (ITA)	AG2R Citroën Team	+ 4"
10	Mattias Skjelmose Jensen (DEN)	Trek–Segafredo	+ 4"

General classification after Stage 1
Rank	Rider	Team	Time
1	Mathieu van der Poel (NED)	Alpecin–Fenix	4h 35' 18"
2	Biniam Girmay (ERI)	Intermarché–Wanty–Gobert Matériaux	+ 4"
3	Pello Bilbao (ESP)	Team Bahrain Victorious	+ 6"
4	Magnus Cort (DEN)	EF Education–EasyPost	+ 10"
5	Wilco Kelderman (NED)	Bora–Hansgrohe	+ 10"
6	Richard Carapaz (ECU)	INEOS Grenadiers	+ 10"
7	Bauke Mollema (NED)	Trek–Segafredo	+ 10"
8	Diego Ulissi (ITA)	UAE Team Emirates	+ 10"
9	Andrea Vendrame (ITA)	AG2R Citroën Team	+ 14"
10	Mattias Skjelmose Jensen (DEN)	Trek–Segafredo	+ 14"

== Stage 2 ==
7 May 2022 — Budapest (Hungary), 9.2 km (5.7 mi) (ITT)

The second stage in Hungary featured the race's first individual time trial, with the riders tackling a 9.2-kilometre (5.7 mi) long technical course in Budapest. The first 7.9 kilometres (4.9 mi) were mostly flat but the final 1.3 kilometres (0.81 mi) featured a fourth-category climb to the finish, with the stage's only intermediate time check located just before it. The first 300 metres (980 ft) of the climb had a steep 14 per cent section before having a false flat uphill section inside the final kilometre.

As is customary for time trial stages, the riders set off in reverse order of their general classification placings. As a result, Harm Vanhoucke (Lotto–Soudal) was the first rider off the start ramp. The first rider to set the benchmark time was Alex Dowsett (Israel–Premier Tech), who set a time of 12' 23". He sat on the hot seat for a time until Jos van Emden (Team Jumbo–Visma) went four seconds quicker with a time of 12' 19". His time was quickly beaten by his teammate, Edoardo Affini, who finished with a time of 12' 10". His time stood for a while until Lennard Kämna (Bora–Hansgrohe) managed to beat Affini's time by three seconds. Some riders came close to beating his time before the Italian national time trial champion, Matteo Sobrero (Team BikeExchange–Jayco), went on to set the provisional fastest time of 12' 03". Only three other riders would go on to beat Sobrero's time. The first was Tom Dumoulin (Team Jumbo–Visma), who went on to set a time of 11' 55", the first time under 12 minutes. His time was quickly beaten by Simon Yates (Team BikeExchange–Jayco), who set the fastest time at the time check before finishing with a time of 11' 50". No one would threaten his time until the last rider off the start ramp, Mathieu van der Poel (Alpecin–Fenix), the race leader. Van der Poel was less than a second behind Yates at the time check but he fell short by three seconds at the finish, giving Yates the stage win. In the battle amongst the potential GC contenders, Yates delivered early blows with his stage win as, apart from Dumoulin only losing five seconds, the rest of the potential contenders lost 17 seconds or more. By finishing second, Van der Poel kept the maglia rosa, the maglia ciclamino, and the maglia azzurra while Sobrero took the white jersey as the best young rider.

Stage 2 Result
Rank	Rider	Team	Time
1	Simon Yates (GBR)	Team BikeExchange–Jayco	11' 50"
2	Mathieu van der Poel (NED)	Alpecin–Fenix	+ 3"
3	Tom Dumoulin (NED)	Team Jumbo–Visma	+ 5"
4	Matteo Sobrero (ITA)	Team BikeExchange–Jayco	+ 13"
5	Ben Tulett (GBR)	INEOS Grenadiers	+ 13"
6	Tobias Foss (NOR)	Team Jumbo–Visma	+ 17"
7	Wilco Kelderman (NED)	Bora–Hansgrohe	+ 17"
8	Lennard Kämna (GER)	Bora–Hansgrohe	+ 17"
9	Mauro Schmid (SUI)	Quick-Step Alpha Vinyl Team	+ 18"
10	Thymen Arensman (NED)	Team DSM	+ 18"

General classification after Stage 2
Rank	Rider	Team	Time
1	Mathieu van der Poel (NED)	Alpecin–Fenix	4h 47' 11"
2	Simon Yates (GBR)	Team BikeExchange–Jayco	+ 11"
3	Tom Dumoulin (NED)	Team Jumbo–Visma	+ 16"
4	Matteo Sobrero (ITA)	Team BikeExchange–Jayco	+ 24"
5	Wilco Kelderman (NED)	Bora–Hansgrohe	+ 24"
6	Ben Tulett (GBR)	INEOS Grenadiers	+ 24"
7	Tobias Foss (NOR)	Team Jumbo–Visma	+ 28"
8	Bauke Mollema (NED)	Trek–Segafredo	+ 28"
9	Pello Bilbao (ESP)	Team Bahrain Victorious	+ 29"
10	Mauro Schmid (SUI)	Quick-Step Alpha Vinyl Team	+ 29"

== Stage 3 ==
8 May 2022 — Kaposvár (Hungary) to Balatonfüred (Hungary), 201 km (125 mi)

The third stage of the Giro featured the first chance for the pure sprinters to take a win in the race as the riders tackled a 201-kilometre (125 mi) flat course from Kaposvár to Balatonfüred. There was only one categorised climb on the route, with the riders tackling the fourth-category climb to Tihany which was crested with 12.6 kilometres (7.8 mi) left. The intermediate sprint for points took place after 69.1 kilometres (42.9 mi) while the intermediate sprint for bonus seconds took place with 53.2 kilometres (33.1 mi) left.

As soon as the stage officially started, the two breakaway riders in stage one, Mattia Bais and Filippo Tagliani of Drone Hopper–Androni Giocattoli, went into the break once again but this time, they were joined by Samuele Rivi (Eolo–Kometa). The trio built an advantage of around seven minutes before Alpecin–Fenix took station at the front of the peloton to bring the break back. With 173 kilometres (107 mi) to go, Jan Tratnik (Team Bahrain Victorious) became the first rider to abandon the race as a result of the injuries he sustained after crashing in stage one. After the three breakaway riders took maximum points at the first intermediate sprint, Fernando Gaviria (UAE Team Emirates) won the sprint for the remaining maximum points. Halfway through the stage, Groupama–FDJ and Lotto–Soudal began to send riders to the front of the peloton to contribute to the chase. With 44 kilometres (27 mi) to go, Rivi accelerated from the break, dropping Tagliani in the process while at this point, the peloton was only around less than a minute behind. Rivi and Bais continued to hover at around less than a minute ahead of the peloton until they were brought back with 28 kilometres (17 mi) left.

After the breakaway riders were caught, the teams of the GC riders and the sprinters went to the front to protect their riders. 12.4 kilometres (7.7 mi) from the finish, Pascal Eenkhoorn (Team Jumbo–Visma) and Rick Zabel (Israel–Premier Tech) escaped from the peloton to battle for the KOM points, which was won by Eenkhoorn. Zabel, meanwhile, took the lead in the mountains classification with the points he gained. Eenkhoorn continued with his move as Zabel dropped back to the peloton, with the lone escapee getting caught with 5.9 kilometres (3.7 mi) remaining. The peloton soon headed towards the inevitable bunch sprint. In the sprint, Caleb Ewan (Lotto–Soudal) was caught out of position while Mark Cavendish (Quick-Step Alpha Vinyl Team), Arnaud Démare (Groupama–FDJ), Biniam Girmay (Intermarché–Wanty–Gobert Matériaux), and Gaviria were put in the best position towards the finish. As Cavendish's final lead out man, Michael Mørkøv, was leading out his sprinter, Cavendish launched his sprint with 300 metres (980 ft) to go. Cavendish held off Démare and Gaviria to win the stage, his 16th Giro stage win. All the main GC contenders finished safely in the peloton. Mathieu van der Poel (Alpecin–Fenix) kept the maglia rosa as there were no changes in the top ten ahead of the race's first rest day.

Stage 3 Result
Rank	Rider	Team	Time
1	Mark Cavendish (GBR)	Quick-Step Alpha Vinyl Team	4h 56' 39"
2	Arnaud Démare (FRA)	Groupama–FDJ	+ 0"
3	Fernando Gaviria (COL)	UAE Team Emirates	+ 0"
4	Biniam Girmay (ERI)	Intermarché–Wanty–Gobert Matériaux	+ 0"
5	Jakub Mareczko (ITA)	Alpecin–Fenix	+ 0"
6	Edward Theuns (BEL)	Trek–Segafredo	+ 0"
7	Simone Consonni (ITA)	Cofidis	+ 0"
8	Caleb Ewan (AUS)	Lotto–Soudal	+ 0"
9	Alberto Dainese (ITA)	Team DSM	+ 0"
10	Phil Bauhaus (GER)	Team Bahrain Victorious	+ 0"

General classification after Stage 3
Rank	Rider	Team	Time
1	Mathieu van der Poel (NED)	Alpecin–Fenix	9h 43' 50"
2	Simon Yates (GBR)	Team BikeExchange–Jayco	+ 11"
3	Tom Dumoulin (NED)	Team Jumbo–Visma	+ 16"
4	Matteo Sobrero (ITA)	Team BikeExchange–Jayco	+ 24"
5	Wilco Kelderman (NED)	Bora–Hansgrohe	+ 24"
6	Ben Tulett (GBR)	INEOS Grenadiers	+ 24"
7	Tobias Foss (NOR)	Team Jumbo–Visma	+ 28"
8	Bauke Mollema (NED)	Trek–Segafredo	+ 28"
9	Pello Bilbao (ESP)	Team Bahrain Victorious	+ 29"
10	Mauro Schmid (SUI)	Quick-Step Alpha Vinyl Team	+ 29"

== Rest day 1 ==
9 May 2022 — Avola

== Stage 4 ==
10 May 2022 — Avola to Etna (Rif. Sapienza), 172 km (107 mi)

Following the rest day, the riders arrived in Sicily for the first mountain stage of the race and the first major test for the GC contenders. On this occasion, the riders finished atop Etna for the fourth time in the last six editions of the race, with the riders going up Rifugio Sapienza. The first 50.2 kilometres (31.2 mi) of the stage featured a hilly section that presented an opportunity for the breakaway to form. Following a descent and a long flat section, the riders headed uphill towards Mount Etna. Just before the climb, the intermediate sprint for points took place with 35.5 kilometres (22.1 mi) left while the intermediate sprint for bonus seconds took place with 23.9 kilometres (14.9 mi) remaining. Officially, the climb up Rifugio Sapienza is 22.8 kilometres (14.2 mi) long with an average gradient of 5.9 per cent. The steepest sections of the climb were in the middle, with a 6-kilometre (3.7 mi) section averaging approximately 7.4 per cent. Following this section, the climb averaged 5.4 per cent before the road flattened inside the final kilometre.

As the stage officially started, the fight for the breakaway was furious, with multiple riders wanting to go into the break. While the fight for the break was ongoing, two crashes took place; among those involved was Simon Yates (Team BikeExchange–Jayco) but no one was seriously injured. As the road started to go uphill, 13 riders jumped from the peloton, with Lilian Calmejane (AG2R Citroën Team) and Simone Ravanelli (Drone Hopper–Androni Giocattoli) attempting to bridge to the leading group; Calmejane would eventually make it to the break while Ravanelli drifted back to the peloton. The best placed GC rider in the break was Mauri Vansevenant (Quick-Step Alpha Vinyl Team), who sat 43 seconds behind the race leader, Mathieu van der Poel (Alpecin–Fenix). The peloton allowed the break to gain 11 minutes of an advantage before INEOS Grenadiers and Team Bahrain Victorious began to control the gap. As the riders rode through the initial uncategorised climb, news broke through that Miguel Ángel López (Astana Qazaqstan Team) abandoned the race after suffering from a left hip injury. The peloton continued to keep the break in check but towards the climb, the break still had a lead of around six minutes. With 28 kilometres (17 mi) to go, Stefano Oldani (Alpecin–Fenix) attacked from the break, immediately building a gap over the rest of the breakaway riders. Oldani won both intermediate sprints while Vansevenant took two seconds at the second intermediate sprint to add to his virtual GC lead.

At the foot of the final climb, the rest of the breakaway group began to split, with six riders remaining in the chase group while Oldani held a lead of almost a minute. With 12 kilometres (7.5 mi) remaining, Juan Pedro López (Trek–Segafredo) accelerated from the chase group, catching Oldani with 9.6 kilometres (6.0 mi) to go before immediately dropping him. Oldani was soon passed by the chase group, which contained three riders: Lennard Kämna (Bora–Hansgrohe), Sylvain Moniquet (Lotto–Soudal), and Vansevenant. 6.3 kilometres (3.9 mi) from the finish, Kämna went off in pursuit of López, who was around half a minute ahead. He would catch the solo leader with 2.5 kilometres (1.6 mi) left, setting up a two-man sprint for the finish. In the final corner, López misjudged the apex, with Kämna building a small gap to take the stage win. Third place on the stage went to Rein Taaramäe (Intermarché–Wanty–Gobert Matériaux), who was dropped from the chase group but gauged his efforts well to finish only half a minute down. In the peloton, a group of 17 riders containing most of the main contenders finished two and a half minutes down as the headwind dissuaded attacks on the climb. Some notable contenders saw their GC hopes dashed on the climb. Vincenzo Nibali (Astana Qazaqstan Team), the team's leader after López's withdrawal, lost more than two minutes, while Tobias Foss (Team Jumbo–Visma) also finished in the same group as the Italian. Foss's teammate, Tom Dumoulin, lost seven minutes.

Despite losing the sprint for the stage win, López took over the maglia rosa as van der Poel was dropped early on the climb while Vansevenant ended up losing two minutes. He also took the white jersey as the best young rider. Kämna took over the maglia azzurra after going first over Mount Etna.

Stage 4 Result
Rank	Rider	Team	Time
1	Lennard Kämna (GER)	Bora–Hansgrohe	4h 32' 11"
2	Juan Pedro López (ESP)	Trek–Segafredo	+ 0"
3	Rein Taaramäe (EST)	Intermarché–Wanty–Gobert Matériaux	+ 34"
4	Sylvain Moniquet (BEL)	Lotto–Soudal	+ 2' 12"
5	Mauri Vansevenant (BEL)	Quick-Step Alpha Vinyl Team	+ 2' 12"
6	Gijs Leemreize (NED)	Team Jumbo–Visma	+ 2' 31"
7	Richard Carapaz (ECU)	INEOS Grenadiers	+ 2' 37"
8	Romain Bardet (FRA)	Team DSM	+ 2' 37"
9	Pello Bilbao (ESP)	Team Bahrain Victorious	+ 2' 37"
10	João Almeida (POR)	UAE Team Emirates	+ 2' 37"

General classification after Stage 4
Rank	Rider	Team	Time
1	Juan Pedro López (ESP)	Trek–Segafredo	14h 17' 07"
2	Lennard Kämna (GER)	Bora–Hansgrohe	+ 39"
3	Rein Taaramäe (EST)	Intermarché–Wanty–Gobert Matériaux	+ 58"
4	Simon Yates (GBR)	Team BikeExchange–Jayco	+ 1' 42"
5	Mauri Vansevenant (BEL)	Quick-Step Alpha Vinyl Team	+ 1' 47"
6	Wilco Kelderman (NED)	Bora–Hansgrohe	+ 1' 55"
7	Pello Bilbao (ESP)	Team Bahrain Victorious	+ 2' 00"
8	João Almeida (POR)	UAE Team Emirates	+ 2' 00"
9	Richie Porte (AUS)	INEOS Grenadiers	+ 2' 04"
10	Romain Bardet (FRA)	Team DSM	+ 2' 06"

== Stage 5 ==
11 May 2022 — Catania to Messina, 174 km (108 mi)

The fifth stage of the Giro featured a 174-kilometre (108 mi) course that took the riders from Catania to Messina. The first 52.4 kilometres (32.6 mi) were mostly flat before the road started to go uphill with the second-category climb of Portella Mandrazzi. The climb is 19.5 kilometres (12.1 mi) long with an average gradient of 4 per cent, offering a chance for the riders to drop the pure sprinters. Following the descent, the road was flat all the way to the finish. The intermediate sprint for points was located just before the climb while the intermediate sprint for bonus seconds was located with 37.3 kilometres (23.2 mi) to go.

It took a few kilometres following the stage's official start before a group of five riders escaped from the peloton. The break contained Jaakko Hänninen (AG2R Citroën Team), Alessandro Tonelli (Bardiani–CSF–Faizanè), Mirco Maestri (Eolo–Kometa), and the Drone Hopper–Androni Giocattoli pair of Mattia Bais and Filippo Tagliani. The quintet took a lead of around four minutes before the sprinters' teams began to control the gap. At the intermediate sprint for points, the break took the maximum points while in the peloton, Biniam Girmay (Intermarché–Wanty–Gobert Matériaux) took the remaining points to close in on the leader of the maglia ciclamino, Mathieu van der Poel (Alpecin–Fenix). As the riders approached the climb, the peloton initially went on a steady pace before Alpecin–Fenix began to increase the pace on the climb. Caleb Ewan (Lotto–Soudal) got distanced after suffering an untimely mechanical, while Mark Cavendish (Quick-Step Alpha Vinyl Team) was soon dropped from the peloton. Towards the top, Arnaud Démare (Groupama–FDJ) was also distanced by the pace. At the top of the climb, the peloton was less than a minute down on the break, with the Démare group around a further minute behind the peloton. Meanwhile, the Cavendish group was more than two minutes down and Ewan's group was four minutes down.

Following the descent, Démare's group managed to catch the peloton, while the breakaway group had already been reeled in with 66 kilometres (41 mi) remaining. With Cavendish's and Ewan's groups unable to make inroads to the peloton's lead, they would eventually give up on chasing the peloton. At the intermediate sprint for bonus seconds, João Almeida (UAE Team Emirates) attempted to take some seconds. He eventually took two seconds as Ben Swift (INEOS Grenadiers) snatched the three bonus seconds. For the rest of the stage, the remaining sprinters' teams prepared for the bunch sprint while the teams of the GC contenders kept their leaders safe. In the final sprint, Groupama–FDJ managed to deliver Démare to the perfect position. Démare held off Fernando Gaviria (UAE Team Emirates) to win his first Grand Tour stage in two years. Giacomo Nizzolo (Israel–Premier Tech) ended up finishing third. With his win, Démare also took the maglia ciclamino. Apart from Almeida taking two bonus seconds and moving up to seventh on GC, there were no other changes in the top ten.

Stage 5 Result
Rank	Rider	Team	Time
1	Arnaud Démare (FRA)	Groupama–FDJ	4h 03' 56"
2	Fernando Gaviria (COL)	UAE Team Emirates	+ 0"
3	Giacomo Nizzolo (ITA)	Israel–Premier Tech	+ 0"
4	Davide Ballerini (ITA)	Quick-Step Alpha Vinyl Team	+ 0"
5	Biniam Girmay (ERI)	Intermarché–Wanty–Gobert Matériaux	+ 0"
6	Phil Bauhaus (GER)	Team Bahrain Victorious	+ 0"
7	Alberto Dainese (ITA)	Team DSM	+ 0"
8	Natnael Tesfatsion (ERI)	Drone Hopper–Androni Giocattoli	+ 0"
9	Edward Theuns (BEL)	Trek–Segafredo	+ 0"
10	Simone Consonni (ITA)	Cofidis	+ 0"

General classification after Stage 5
Rank	Rider	Team	Time
1	Juan Pedro López (ESP)	Trek–Segafredo	18h 21' 03"
2	Lennard Kämna (GER)	Bora–Hansgrohe	+ 39"
3	Rein Taaramäe (EST)	Intermarché–Wanty–Gobert Matériaux	+ 58"
4	Simon Yates (GBR)	Team BikeExchange–Jayco	+ 1' 42"
5	Mauri Vansevenant (BEL)	Quick-Step Alpha Vinyl Team	+ 1' 47"
6	Wilco Kelderman (NED)	Bora–Hansgrohe	+ 1' 55"
7	João Almeida (POR)	UAE Team Emirates	+ 1' 58"
8	Pello Bilbao (ESP)	Team Bahrain Victorious	+ 2' 00"
9	Richie Porte (AUS)	INEOS Grenadiers	+ 2' 04"
10	Romain Bardet (FRA)	Team DSM	+ 2' 06"

== Stage 6 ==
12 May 2022 — Palmi to Scalea (Riviera dei Cedri), 192 km (119 mi)

The sixth stage took the riders from Palmi to Scalea with a stage for the pure sprinters. After 12 kilometres (7.5 mi), the riders travelled through an uncategorised climb before reaching the fourth-category climb to Aeroporto L. Razza, a 4.1-kilometre (2.5 mi) climb with an average gradient of 3.7 per cent. Following the descent, the rest of the stage was mostly flat, apart from a few small lumps on the way to the finish. The intermediate sprint for points took place after 40.6 kilometres (25.2 mi) while the intermediate sprint for bonus seconds took place with 44.3 kilometres (27.5 mi) left.

After the stage's official start, there were a few attempts by riders to go into the break, but the riders did not go full gas in their attempts. Eventually, with 170 kilometres (110 mi) to go, Diego Rosa (Eolo–Kometa) embarked on a solo breakaway and the peloton was content to let him go. He took a lead of around five and a half minutes before the sprinters' teams began to stabilise the gap. 151 kilometres (94 mi) from the finish, the Drone Hopper–Androni Giocattoli trio of Eduardo Sepúlveda, Filippo Tagliani, and Simone Ravanelli attacked from the peloton. At the intermediate sprint for points, the breakaway riders took maximum points while Biniam Girmay (Intermarché–Wanty–Gobert Matériaux) outsprinted Arnaud Démare (Groupama–FDJ) for the maglia ciclamino. With 141 kilometres (88 mi) to go, Sepúlveda, Tagliani, and Ravanelli were swept up by the peloton as the three were unable to bridge up to Rosa. For the rest of the day, the peloton rode at a steady pace while slowly decreasing Rosa's gap. At the intermediate sprint for bonus seconds, there was a slight action in the peloton as Tagliani crossed the sprint in second to increase his lead in the intermediate sprints classification while Lennard Kämna (Bora–Hansgrohe), second in the GC, took one second to close in on the lead of Juan Pedro López (Trek–Segafredo). With 27.6 kilometres (17.1 mi) remaining, Rosa was finally caught by the peloton. The peloton soon headed towards the inevitable bunch sprint, with the sprinters' teams preparing their trains and the GC teams protecting their leaders. At the finish, Mark Cavendish (Quick-Step Alpha Vinyl Team) was the first to launch his sprint. Caleb Ewan (Lotto–Soudal) came around him but Démare was coming out of the Australian's slipstream. Démare managed to pip Ewan at the line with a bike throw to win his second consecutive stage. Cavendish held on for third while Girmay finished fourth. With his win, Démare further extended his lead for the maglia ciclamino. Apart from Kämna taking one bonus second, there were no changes in the top ten of the GC.

Stage 6 Result
Rank	Rider	Team	Time
1	Arnaud Démare (FRA)	Groupama–FDJ	5h 02' 33"
2	Caleb Ewan (AUS)	Lotto–Soudal	+ 0"
3	Mark Cavendish (GBR)	Quick-Step Alpha Vinyl Team	+ 0"
4	Biniam Girmay (ERI)	Intermarché–Wanty–Gobert Matériaux	+ 0"
5	Giacomo Nizzolo (ITA)	Israel–Premier Tech	+ 0"
6	Phil Bauhaus (GER)	Team Bahrain Victorious	+ 0"
7	Andrea Vendrame (ITA)	AG2R Citroën Team	+ 0"
8	Simone Consonni (ITA)	Cofidis	+ 0"
9	Vincenzo Albanese (ITA)	Eolo–Kometa	+ 0"
10	Edward Theuns (BEL)	Trek–Segafredo	+ 0"

General classification after Stage 6
Rank	Rider	Team	Time
1	Juan Pedro López (ESP)	Trek–Segafredo	23h 23' 36"
2	Lennard Kämna (GER)	Bora–Hansgrohe	+ 38"
3	Rein Taaramäe (EST)	Intermarché–Wanty–Gobert Matériaux	+ 58"
4	Simon Yates (GBR)	Team BikeExchange–Jayco	+ 1' 42"
5	Mauri Vansevenant (BEL)	Quick-Step Alpha Vinyl Team	+ 1' 47"
6	Wilco Kelderman (NED)	Bora–Hansgrohe	+ 1' 55"
7	João Almeida (POR)	UAE Team Emirates	+ 1' 58"
8	Pello Bilbao (ESP)	Team Bahrain Victorious	+ 2' 00"
9	Richie Porte (AUS)	INEOS Grenadiers	+ 2' 04"
10	Romain Bardet (FRA)	Team DSM	+ 2' 06"

== Stage 7 ==
13 May 2022 — Diamante to Potenza, 196 km (122 mi)

The seventh stage was a 196-kilometre (122 mi) hilly course that took the riders from Diamante to Potenza. After a short flat section and few small lumps, the riders reached the foot of the second-category Passo Colla, a 9.3-kilometre (5.8 mi) climb with an average gradient of 4.5 per cent. Following the descent, the riders tackled the longest climb of the day, the first-category Monte Sirino. The climb is 24.4 kilometres (15.2 mi) long with an average gradient of 3.8 per cent, but the climb featured some descents and some flat sections. After the descent, the riders tackled an uncategorised climb on the way to the intermediate sprint for points at Viggiano with 70 kilometres (43 mi) left. The short descent immediately led to the foot of the second-category Mont. Grande di Viggiano, a 6.6-kilometre (4.1 mi) climb with an average gradient of 9.1 per cent. The climb was crested with 60.4 kilometres (37.5 mi) remaining. Following the descent and another uncategorised climb, the riders tackled the last categorised climb of the day, the third-category La Sellata, which is 7.8 kilometres (4.8 mi) long with an average gradient of 5.9 per cent. The descent led to the foot of another uncategorised climb, where the riders reached the intermediate sprint for bonus seconds with 7 kilometres (4.3 mi) to go. A short descent led to the finish at Potenza, where the last climb of 350 metres (1,150 ft) had an average gradient of 8 per cent, with a maximum gradient of 13 per cent.

Multiple attacks marked the start of the stage as several riders attempted to make it into the breakaway. Over the first part of the stage, different groups of riders tried to make it into the break before being swept up by the peloton. On the first climb, the Passo Colla, Wout Poels (Team Bahrain Victorious) eventually managed to build a gap and took maximum points for the KOM classification. On the descent, Davide Formolo (UAE Team Emirates) and Anthony Perez (Cofidis) managed to bridge up to Poels before a group of nine riders also made it to the front group. A little bit later, Richard Carapaz (INEOS Grenadiers) made a surprise attack together with his teammate, Jhonatan Narváez, and Mathieu van der Poel (Alpecin–Fenix). They made it to the lead group to make it 15 out front before Formolo and Jorge Arcas (Movistar Team) attacked out of the leading group. The group of 13 chasers, including Carapaz, were eventually caught by the peloton, while out front, Formolo began to distance Arcas. With the gap still close, Davide Villella (Cofidis) attacked from the peloton to join Formolo. They were soon joined by Koen Bouwman (Team Jumbo–Visma) and Poels on the climb of Monte Sirino. A bit further later, Bauke Mollema (Trek–Segafredo), Diego Camargo (EF Education–EasyPost), and Bouwman's teammate, Tom Dumoulin, also made it to the front to make it a seven-man group, with the peloton content to let them go.

The group increased their lead to as much as five and a half minutes before Trek–Segafredo controlled the gap as Bouwman was only 5' 30" down on the GC leader, Juan Pedro López. At the top of Monte Sirino, Bouwman sprinted to take the maximum KOM points. On the approach to the climb of Mont. Grande di Viggiano, Villella went down in a crash before getting back up, while Poels was distanced on the climb itself. At the top, Bouwman once again took maximum KOM points to take the virtual lead in the mountains classification. With around 46 kilometres (29 mi) left, Villella made it back to the front group. On the climb of La Sellata, Villella and Camargo were unable to follow the pace while Dumoulin, Mollema, and Formolo took turns attacking on the climb. At one point, Bouwman was distanced but he made it back at the top of the climb, also taking the maximum KOM points in the process. At the final uncategorised climb, Mollema and Formolo made separate attacks, with Dumoulin getting dropped in the process. Dumoulin eventually made it back to the front with 3.2 kilometres (2.0 mi) left, setting up a sprint for the stage win. Dumoulin led out the group for his teammate, Bouwman, who launched his sprint with 200 metres (660 ft) to go. He would not get passed as he took his first Grand Tour stage win. Mollema took second, with Formolo taking third. Aside from his win, Bouwman also took the maglia azzurra.

In the GC group, there were no attacks, with INEOS Grenadiers setting a steady pace. On the uphill finish, a sprint ensued but there were no gaps in the group, which finished almost three minutes down. As a result, López kept the maglia rosa as there were no changes in the top ten of the GC.

Stage 7 Result
Rank	Rider	Team	Time
1	Koen Bouwman (NED)	Team Jumbo–Visma	5h 12' 30"
2	Bauke Mollema (NED)	Trek–Segafredo	+ 2"
3	Davide Formolo (ITA)	UAE Team Emirates	+ 2"
4	Tom Dumoulin (NED)	Team Jumbo–Visma	+ 19"
5	Davide Villella (ITA)	Cofidis	+ 2' 25"
6	Lennard Kämna (GER)	Bora–Hansgrohe	+ 2' 59"
7	Vincenzo Albanese (ITA)	Eolo–Kometa	+ 2' 59"
8	João Almeida (POR)	UAE Team Emirates	+ 2' 59"
9	Alejandro Valverde (ESP)	Movistar Team	+ 2' 59"
10	Richard Carapaz (ECU)	INEOS Grenadiers	+ 2' 59"

General classification after Stage 7
Rank	Rider	Team	Time
1	Juan Pedro López (ESP)	Trek–Segafredo	28h 39' 05"
2	Lennard Kämna (GER)	Bora–Hansgrohe	+ 38"
3	Rein Taaramäe (EST)	Intermarché–Wanty–Gobert Matériaux	+ 58"
4	Simon Yates (GBR)	Team BikeExchange–Jayco	+ 1' 42"
5	Mauri Vansevenant (BEL)	Quick-Step Alpha Vinyl Team	+ 1' 47"
6	Wilco Kelderman (NED)	Bora–Hansgrohe	+ 1' 55"
7	João Almeida (POR)	UAE Team Emirates	+ 1' 58"
8	Pello Bilbao (ESP)	Team Bahrain Victorious	+ 2' 00"
9	Richie Porte (AUS)	INEOS Grenadiers	+ 2' 04"
10	Romain Bardet (FRA)	Team DSM	+ 2' 06"

== Stage 8 ==
14 May 2022 — Naples to Naples (Procida Capitale Italiana della Cultura), 153 km (95 mi)

The eighth stage took the riders on a circuit that started and ended in Naples, with a parcours that included several short climbs. The first few kilometers featured two uncategorised hills before the riders reached the intermediate sprint for points after 37.4 kilometres (23.2 mi). Upon reaching Bacoli after 58.6 kilometres (36.4 mi) of racing, the riders faced four laps of a circuit that featured the climb of Monte di Procida and another short climb to Lago Lucrino. The climb of Monte di Procida is 2.1 kilometres (1.3 mi) long with an average of 6 per cent while the climb to Lago Lucrino is 700 metres (2,300 ft) long with an average of 9.3 per cent. The last passage of Monte di Procida is categorised as a fourth-category climb. The intermediate sprint for bonus seconds is located at Bacoli with 37.3 kilometres (23.2 mi) remaining before the riders leave the circuit following the fourth passage to Lago Lucrino with 25.8 kilometres (16.0 mi) left. The riders faced two more uncategorised climbs before finishing in Naples.

The first few kilometers of the stage saw a group of 21 riders roll off the front to establish the breakaway. The break included riders such as Mathieu van der Poel (Alpecin–Fenix), Biniam Girmay (Intermarché–Wanty–Gobert Matériaux), Diego Ulissi (UAE Team Emirates), Thomas De Gendt (Lotto–Soudal), and Wout Poels (Team Bahrain Victorious) while the best-placed GC rider in the break was Guillaume Martin (Cofidis), only 4' 06" down on the race leader, Juan Pedro López (Trek–Segafredo). After 7.2 kilometres (4.5 mi) of racing, van der Poel attempted to solo off the front, but he was eventually caught by the 20 chasers. At one point, EF Education–EasyPost attempted to chase down the break but they were unable to bring it back. Eventually, Martin's presence in the break prompted Trek–Segafredo to control the break's advantage, which was two and a half minutes at its maximum. At the intermediate sprint for points, Girmay took maximum points to decrease Arnaud Démare's (Groupama–FDJ) lead in the points classification to 41. With 89 kilometres (55 mi) to go, Jasha Sütterlin (Team Bahrain Victorious) dropped back from the break to make it 20 out front. 46.3 kilometres (28.8 mi) from the finish, van der Poel accelerated out of the break once again, but he was eventually caught. As a result of his attack, the breakaway group began to split.

With 42.8 kilometres (26.6 mi) left, Davide Gabburo (Bardiani–CSF–Faizanè) attacked out of the break. Only the Lotto–Soudal pair of Harm Vanhoucke and De Gendt, Jorge Arcas (Movistar Team), and Simone Ravanelli (Drone Hopper–Androni Giocattoli) were able to bridge up to him to establish the front group, although Ravanelli would soon drop back to the chasers. They quickly built their lead to around 20 seconds over the chase group. The front group continued to work well together to maintain and extend their gap over the chasers. On the final passage of the climb to Lago Lucrino, attacks from the chasers split the group further, leaving Mauro Schmid (Quick-Step Alpha Vinyl Team), van der Poel, Girmay, Martin, and Poels as the five riders left in the chase group. The front group’s lead went to as high as 40 seconds before the gap began to come down once again. Inside the final 4 kilometres (2.5 mi), with the gap to the front group down to less than 20 seconds, van der Poel and Girmay accelerated out of the chase group, while Schmid soon tried to bridge up to the pair. The leaders’ gap came down to around eight seconds, but they had enough to contest the stage win. In the sprint, Vanhoucke led out the group for his teammate, De Gendt. De Gendt came out of his slipstream and held off Gabburo and Arcas to win the stage. In the chasing group, Schmid bridged up to van der Poel and Girmay but the Eritrean won the sprint for fifth. Poels and Martin finished 33 seconds down.

In the GC group, Trek–Segafredo continued to lead the peloton. On the final uncategorised climb, Lennard Kämna (Bora–Hansgrohe) tried to attack López but the race leader was able to mark his move. The peloton finished at three and a half minutes down, which meant that Martin rose up to fourth on GC at around a minute down.

Stage 8 Result
Rank	Rider	Team	Time
1	Thomas De Gendt (BEL)	Lotto–Soudal	3h 32' 53"
2	Davide Gabburo (ITA)	Bardiani–CSF–Faizanè	+ 0"
3	Jorge Arcas (ESP)	Movistar Team	+ 0"
4	Harm Vanhoucke (BEL)	Lotto–Soudal	+ 4"
5	Biniam Girmay (ERI)	Intermarché–Wanty–Gobert Matériaux	+ 15"
6	Mauro Schmid (SUI)	Quick-Step Alpha Vinyl Team	+ 15"
7	Mathieu van der Poel (NED)	Alpecin–Fenix	+ 15"
8	Wout Poels (NED)	Team Bahrain Victorious	+ 33"
9	Guillaume Martin (FRA)	Cofidis	+ 33"
10	Fabio Felline (ITA)	Astana Qazaqstan Team	+ 2' 56"

General classification after Stage 8
Rank	Rider	Team	Time
1	Juan Pedro López (ESP)	Trek–Segafredo	32h 15' 31"
2	Lennard Kämna (GER)	Bora–Hansgrohe	+ 38"
3	Rein Taaramäe (EST)	Intermarché–Wanty–Gobert Matériaux	+ 58"
4	Guillaume Martin (FRA)	Cofidis	+ 1' 06"
5	Simon Yates (GBR)	Team BikeExchange–Jayco	+ 1' 42"
6	Mauri Vansevenant (BEL)	Quick-Step Alpha Vinyl Team	+ 1' 47"
7	Wilco Kelderman (NED)	Bora–Hansgrohe	+ 1' 55"
8	João Almeida (POR)	UAE Team Emirates	+ 1' 58"
9	Pello Bilbao (ESP)	Team Bahrain Victorious	+ 2' 00"
10	Richie Porte (AUS)	INEOS Grenadiers	+ 2' 04"

== Stage 9 ==
15 May 2022 — Isernia to Blockhaus, 191 km (119 mi)

The last stage before the second rest day featured the second summit finish of the race with the riders finishing atop the climb of Blockhaus. The climb was last used in 2017, when Nairo Quintana soloed to the stage win. From the get-go, the riders climbed the third-category Valico del Macerone, the second-category Rionero Sannitico, and the second-category Roccaraso, all in quick succession in the first 37.6 kilometres (23.4 mi). For the next 99.8 kilometres (62.0 mi), the riders faced an undulating course, with the riders reaching the intermediate sprint for points at Filetto with 87.5 kilometres (54.4 mi) left. 53.6 kilometres (33.3 mi) from the finish, the riders started the first-category climb of Passo Lanciano, a 10.3-kilometre (6.4 mi) climb with an average gradient of 7.6 per cent. The climb was crested with 43.3 kilometres (26.9 mi) to go. Following the descent, the riders tackled an uncategorised climb to the intermediate sprint for bonus seconds with 13.5 kilometres (8.4 mi) remaining, right at the foot of the first-category climb of Blockhaus. Officially, the climb is 13.6 kilometres (8.5 mi) long with an average gradient of 8.4 per cent. The last 10 kilometres (6.2 mi) of the climb averaged 9.4 per cent.

The start of the stage featured attempts by several riders to go up the road. At one point, the likes of the maglia azzurra wearer Koen Bouwman (Team Jumbo–Visma) and Mathieu van der Poel (Alpecin–Fenix) tried to go into the break but they were unable to escape. Eventually, Diego Rosa (Eolo–Kometa) flew off the front on the climb of Rionero Sannitico, with Joe Dombrowski (Astana Qazaqstan Team) and Natnael Tesfatsion (Drone Hopper–Androni Giocattoli) chasing him a few seconds down. A group of six chasers also formed on the climb, consisting of the AG2R Citroën Team duo of Nans Peters and Felix Gall, Filippo Zana (Bardiani–CSF–Faizanè), Eduardo Sepúlveda (Drone Hopper–Androni Giocattoli), Jonathan Caicedo (EF Education–EasyPost), and James Knox (Quick-Step Alpha Vinyl Team). On the climb, a crash involving some riders, including Pello Bilbao (Team Bahrain Victorious), took place but all riders would get back up. On the descent, the nine riders up the road would join together to form the break of the day. The break increased their lead to four and a half minutes before Trek–Segafredo began to stabilise the gap. Their advantage grew to as much as five and a half minutes before Jonathan Castroviejo (INEOS Grenadiers) started to eat into their lead.

With around 62 kilometres (39 mi) to go, action began in the break as Peters launched two separate attacks, pulling away together with Tesfatsion. There were some attacks in the chasing group but only Sepúlveda was able to bridge up to Peters and Tesfatsion. On the climb of Passo Lanciano, Rosa was able to make it to the front group to make it a quartet. 49 kilometres (30 mi) from the finish, Rosa attacked the front group and only Tesfatsion was able to go with him. Meanwhile, the chase group split, with some riders getting swept up by the peloton. On the descent, Tesfatsion went off road before crashing, but he was able to get back on his bike. Another rider who crashed on the descent was Mikel Landa (Team Bahrain Victorious) though he was not seriously injured. Wilco Kelderman (Bora–Hansgrohe) also suffered a mechanical on the descent, which ended up being crucial as he lost 10 minutes on the stage. On the uncategorised climb before Blockhaus, Peters and Dombrowski managed to bridge to Rosa but at this point, the peloton was only less than a minute behind. Dombrowski was the last surviving member of the break but he was swept up with 15.7 kilometres (9.8 mi) left.

On the climb, INEOS Grenadiers and Rui Costa (UAE Team Emirates) set the pace early on. With 12.3 kilometres (7.6 mi) remaining, Giulio Ciccone (Trek–Segafredo) was the first contender to be distanced, followed soon after by Simon Yates (Team BikeExchange–Jayco), who was suffering from knee pain due to his crash on stage four. Hugh Carthy (EF Education–EasyPost) also could not keep up, losing almost four minutes by the end. With around 8 kilometres (5.0 mi) left, after a touch of wheels, the race leader, Juan Pedro López (Trek–Segafredo) unclipped his pedals, causing him to lose contact with the lead group, which continued to thin out. 4.6 kilometres (2.9 mi) from the finish, Richard Carapaz (INEOS Grenadiers) was the first contender to make his move. Romain Bardet (Team DSM) and Landa were the only ones able to follow his move. Meanwhile, a chase group formed, consisting of João Almeida (UAE Team Emirates), Jai Hindley (Bora–Hansgrohe), Vincenzo Nibali (Astana Qazaqstan Team), Domenico Pozzovivo (Intermarché–Wanty–Gobert Matériaux), and Alejandro Valverde (Movistar Team). Towards the top, Valverde and Nibali lost contact with the chase group while Almeida slowly brought back the three leaders. After Almeida, Hindley, and Pozzovivo bridged up to the lead group, Pozzovivo and Bardet made separate attacks. Bardet's move was joined by Carapaz and Landa but the other three chasers would slowly come back inside the final kilometer to set up a six-man sprint for the win. In the sprint, Hindley held off Bardet and Carapaz to take the stage win. Landa and Almeida took fourth and fifth, respectively, at the same time as Hindley. Meanwhile, López finished 1' 46" down, which was just enough to keep the maglia rosa.

In the GC, Almeida, Bardet, Carapaz, and Hindley moved inside the top five, within 20 seconds of López. Guillaume Martin (Cofidis) sits at sixth, 28 seconds down, while Landa is behind him by a second. Pozzovivo is the only other rider within a minute of López's maglia rosa, 54 seconds down. Meanwhile, Rosa took the maglia azzurra with the KOM points he gained on the stage.

Stage 9 Result
Rank	Rider	Team	Time
1	Jai Hindley (AUS)	Bora–Hansgrohe	5h 34' 44"
2	Romain Bardet (FRA)	Team DSM	+ 0"
3	Richard Carapaz (ECU)	INEOS Grenadiers	+ 0"
4	Mikel Landa (ESP)	Team Bahrain Victorious	+ 0"
5	João Almeida (POR)	UAE Team Emirates	+ 0"
6	Domenico Pozzovivo (ITA)	Intermarché–Wanty–Gobert Matériaux	+ 3"
7	Emanuel Buchmann (GER)	Bora–Hansgrohe	+ 16"
8	Vincenzo Nibali (ITA)	Astana Qazaqstan Team	+ 34"
9	Alejandro Valverde (ESP)	Movistar Team	+ 46"
10	Thymen Arensman (NED)	Team DSM	+ 58"

General classification after Stage 9
Rank	Rider	Team	Time
1	Juan Pedro López (ESP)	Trek–Segafredo	37h 52' 01"
2	João Almeida (POR)	UAE Team Emirates	+ 12"
3	Romain Bardet (FRA)	Team DSM	+ 14"
4	Richard Carapaz (ECU)	INEOS Grenadiers	+ 15"
5	Jai Hindley (AUS)	Bora–Hansgrohe	+ 20"
6	Guillaume Martin (FRA)	Cofidis	+ 28"
7	Mikel Landa (ESP)	Team Bahrain Victorious	+ 29"
8	Domenico Pozzovivo (ITA)	Intermarché–Wanty–Gobert Matériaux	+ 54"
9	Emanuel Buchmann (GER)	Bora–Hansgrohe	+ 1' 09"
10	Pello Bilbao (ESP)	Team Bahrain Victorious	+ 1' 22"

== Rest day 2 ==
16 May 2022 — Pescara

== Stage 10 ==
17 May 2022 — Pescara to Jesi, 196 km (122 mi)

The first stage after the second rest day took the riders from Pescara to Jesi with a stage that featured an undulating final part. The first half of the stage was pan flat until the riders reached the intermediate sprint for points with 96.6 kilometres (60.0 mi) remaining. The rest of the stage was undulating, featuring several short, uncategorised hills as well as the fourth-category climbs of Crocette di Montecosaro, Recanati, and Monsano, the last climb which was crested with 8.5 kilometres (5.3 mi) to go. The intermediate sprint for bonus seconds was located at Filottrano with 42.4 kilometres (26.3 mi) left.

A few kilometres following the stage's official start, Lawrence Naesen (AG2R Citroën Team) and Mattia Bais (Drone Hopper–Androni Giocattoli) went off the front of the peloton, with Alessandro De Marchi (Israel–Premier Tech) joining the two shortly afterwards. The peloton allowed the trio to build a maximum advantage of around six and a half minutes before Alpecin–Fenix and Intermarché–Wanty–Gobert Matériaux began to take control at the front of the peloton. With around 89 kilometres (55 mi) to go, Christopher Juul-Jensen (Team BikeExchange–Jayco) attempted to attack but his attack was short-lived. At one point during the stage, INEOS Grenadiers' GC leader, Richard Carapaz, was involved in a minor crash but he was not seriously injured. At the intermediate sprint for points, the break took maximum points while in the peloton, the maglia ciclamino wearer, Arnaud Démare (Groupama–FDJ), took fourth to extend his lead in the points classification. During the undulating second part of the course, Caleb Ewan (Lotto–Soudal) and Mark Cavendish (Quick-Step Alpha Vinyl Team) were dropped by the peloton. With 70.5 kilometres (43.8 mi) remaining, David de la Cruz (Astana Qazaqstan Team) attacked from the peloton but he was quickly caught. Around 57 kilometres (35 mi) from the finish, Mathieu van der Poel (Alpecin–Fenix) had a mechanical before eventually coming back to the peloton.

With 33 kilometres (21 mi) left, action took place in the peloton as Juul-Jensen made another attack, this time being marked by Dries De Bondt (Alpecin–Fenix) and Lorenzo Rota (Intermarché–Wanty–Gobert Matériaux) before they were reeled back in. At the same time, at the front, De Marchi left Naesen and Bais behind on one of the uncategorised hills. He would eventually be caught with 20.8 kilometres (12.9 mi) left. On the final categorised climb to Monsano, INEOS Grenadiers set a furious pace in an attempt to drop some contenders. The pace dropped pure sprinters such as Démare, Fernando Gaviria (UAE Team Emirates), and Giacomo Nizzolo (Israel–Premier Tech). The finale of the stage was marked by several attacks by riders who wanted to avoid a sprint. Alessandro Covi (UAE Team Emirates) and Vincenzo Nibali (Astana Qazaqstan Team) made separate attacks but they were quickly brought back. There was also a move by Simon Yates (Team BikeExchange–Jayco) that was followed by Davide Formolo (UAE Team Emirates), Giulio Ciccone (Trek–Segafredo), and van der Poel, but the move was shut down by Intermarché–Wanty–Gobert Matériaux. Van der Poel also attempted a solo attack but he was brought back. Carapaz and Hugh Carthy (EF Education–EasyPost) also attacked at separate times but it all came down to a reduced bunch sprint. Domenico Pozzovivo (Intermarché–Wanty–Gobert Matériaux) led it out towards the final, with his teammate, Biniam Girmay, launching a long sprint. Van der Poel tried to come around him but he ran out of gas at the end as Girmay became the first Black African rider to win a Grand Tour stage. All the main GC contenders finished in the lead group as Juan Pedro López (Trek–Segafredo) kept the maglia rosa.

On the podium, as Girmay was opening the bottle of Prosecco, the cork hit his left eye at full speed. He was checked by race and team doctors before being sent to the hospital for treatment. The following day, Girmay confirmed that he would not start stage 11 in order to let his eye injury fully heal.

Stage 10 Result
Rank	Rider	Team	Time
1	Biniam Girmay (ERI)	Intermarché–Wanty–Gobert Matériaux	4h 32' 07"
2	Mathieu van der Poel (NED)	Alpecin–Fenix	+ 0"
3	Vincenzo Albanese (ITA)	Eolo–Kometa	+ 0"
4	Wilco Kelderman (NED)	Bora–Hansgrohe	+ 0"
5	Richard Carapaz (ECU)	INEOS Grenadiers	+ 0"
6	Koen Bouwman (NED)	Team Jumbo–Visma	+ 0"
7	Romain Bardet (FRA)	Team DSM	+ 0"
8	Pello Bilbao (ESP)	Team Bahrain Victorious	+ 0"
9	João Almeida (POR)	UAE Team Emirates	+ 0"
10	Mauro Schmid (SUI)	Quick-Step Alpha Vinyl Team	+ 0"

General classification after Stage 10
Rank	Rider	Team	Time
1	Juan Pedro López (ESP)	Trek–Segafredo	42h 24' 08"
2	João Almeida (POR)	UAE Team Emirates	+ 12"
3	Romain Bardet (FRA)	Team DSM	+ 14"
4	Richard Carapaz (ECU)	INEOS Grenadiers	+ 15"
5	Jai Hindley (AUS)	Bora–Hansgrohe	+ 20"
6	Guillaume Martin (FRA)	Cofidis	+ 28"
7	Mikel Landa (ESP)	Team Bahrain Victorious	+ 29"
8	Domenico Pozzovivo (ITA)	Intermarché–Wanty–Gobert Matériaux	+ 54"
9	Emanuel Buchmann (GER)	Bora–Hansgrohe	+ 1' 09"
10	Pello Bilbao (ESP)	Team Bahrain Victorious	+ 1' 22"

== Stage 11 ==
18 May 2022 — Santarcangelo di Romagna to Reggio Emilia, 203 km (126 mi)

The eleventh stage of the Giro took the riders from Santarcangelo di Romagna to Reggio Emilia with a stage that was expected to be for the pure sprinters. The entirety of the stage was pan flat, with no climbs along the way. The intermediate sprint for points took place with 126.6 kilometres (78.7 mi) left while the intermediate sprint for bonus seconds took place with 76.3 kilometres (47.4 mi) remaining.

As soon as the flag was waved to signal the official start, Filippo Tagliani (Drone Hopper–Androni Giocattoli) and Luca Rastelli (Bardiani–CSF–Faizanè) pulled away off the front to comprise the day's breakaway. They were given an advantage of around five minutes before the sprinters' teams began the chase. At the intermediate sprint for points, the duo up front took maximum points while in the peloton, Mark Cavendish (Quick-Step Alpha Vinyl Team) won the sprint for third, just ahead of the maglia ciclamino wearer, Arnaud Démare (Groupama–FDJ). As soon as the peloton went onto exposed roads, the pace in the peloton was greatly increased, with the break already getting reeled in with 92.1 kilometres (57.2 mi) to go. At one point, a group containing Caleb Ewan (Lotto–Soudal) was dropped off the back of the peloton but they eventually managed to make it back. At the intermediate sprint for bonus seconds, Richard Carapaz (INEOS Grenadiers) sprinted to take three bonus seconds. There were attempts throughout the day to split the peloton into echelons, but the wind was not strong enough.

With around 58 kilometres (36 mi) left, Dries De Bondt (Alpecin–Fenix) opened a gap to the peloton. His lead went to over a minute, but the peloton kept him in check. De Bondt was able to keep a lead of around half a minute over the peloton onto the final kilometres before he was eventually swept up with 1.3 kilometres (0.81 mi) left. In the final sprint, Fernando Gaviria (UAE Team Emirates) and Simone Consonni (Cofidis) initially emerged as the strongest sprinters until Alberto Dainese (Team DSM) went around them to win the stage, his first Grand Tour stage win and the first by an Italian in this Giro. Gaviria took second over Consonni while Démare, Ewan, and Cavendish finished fourth, fifth, and sixth, respectively. Juan Pedro López (Trek–Segafredo) kept the maglia rosa, with the only change in the top ten being that Carapaz moved up to second with his three bonus seconds, at the same time as João Almeida (UAE Team Emirates).

Stage 11 Result
Rank	Rider	Team	Time
1	Alberto Dainese (ITA)	Team DSM	4h 19' 04"
2	Fernando Gaviria (COL)	UAE Team Emirates	+ 0"
3	Simone Consonni (ITA)	Cofidis	+ 0"
4	Arnaud Démare (FRA)	Groupama–FDJ	+ 0"
5	Caleb Ewan (AUS)	Lotto–Soudal	+ 0"
6	Mark Cavendish (GBR)	Quick-Step Alpha Vinyl Team	+ 0"
7	Edward Theuns (BEL)	Trek–Segafredo	+ 0"
8	Sacha Modolo (ITA)	Bardiani–CSF–Faizanè	+ 0"
9	Phil Bauhaus (GER)	Team Bahrain Victorious	+ 0"
10	Lawrence Naesen (BEL)	AG2R Citroën Team	+ 0"

General classification after Stage 11
Rank	Rider	Team	Time
1	Juan Pedro López (ESP)	Trek–Segafredo	46h 43' 12"
2	Richard Carapaz (ECU)	INEOS Grenadiers	+ 12"
3	João Almeida (POR)	UAE Team Emirates	+ 12"
4	Romain Bardet (FRA)	Team DSM	+ 14"
5	Jai Hindley (AUS)	Bora–Hansgrohe	+ 20"
6	Guillaume Martin (FRA)	Cofidis	+ 28"
7	Mikel Landa (ESP)	Team Bahrain Victorious	+ 29"
8	Domenico Pozzovivo (ITA)	Intermarché–Wanty–Gobert Matériaux	+ 54"
9	Emanuel Buchmann (GER)	Bora–Hansgrohe	+ 1' 09"
10	Pello Bilbao (ESP)	Team Bahrain Victorious	+ 1' 22"
