= San Vito, Emilia-Romagna =

Town in Romagna, Italy

San Vito
- Frazione of Rimini and Santarcangelo di Romagna
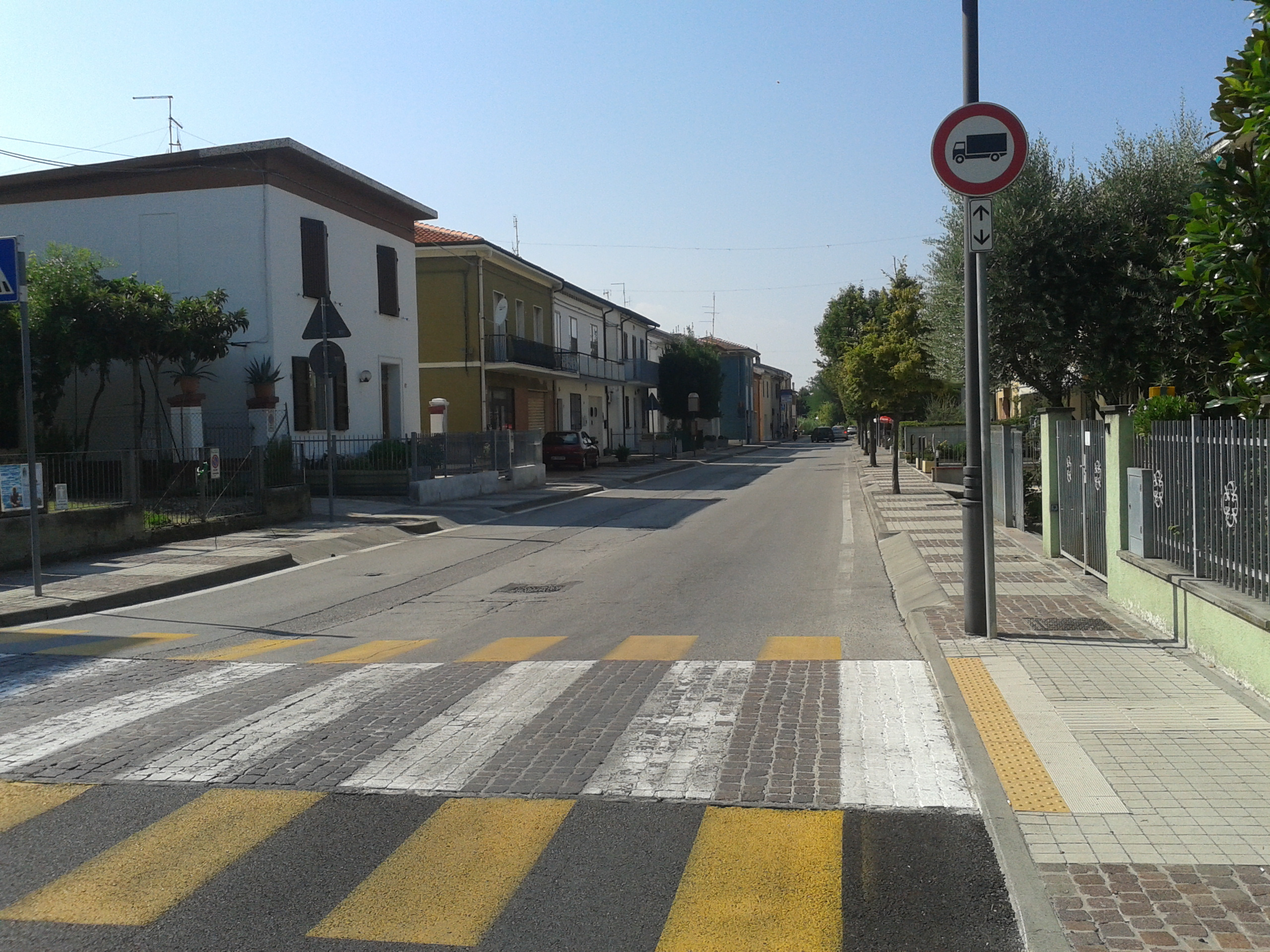
- Via Emilia Vecchia, August 2013
- Interactive map of San Vito
- Coordinates: 44°5′1.14″N 12°27′28.26″E
- Country: Italy
- Region: Emilia-Romagna
- Province: Rimini; Forlì-Cesena (part)
- Comune: Rimini; Santarcangelo di Romagna; San Mauro Pascoli (part)

Population
  - Estimate (c. 2021): 4,000
- Demonym: Sanvitese(i)
- Time zone: UTC+1 (CET)
  - Summer (DST): UTC+2 (CEST)
- Postal code: 47822

San Vito is a town in Emilia-Romagna, northern Italy. The town is divided between the comuni of Rimini and Santarcangelo di Romagna, both in the Province of Rimini, with a northern part in San Mauro Pascoli, in the Province of Forlì-Cesena. Culturally, the town is closest to Santarcangelo.

The town is on the right bank of the river Uso, which flows from Perticara, a frazione of Novafeltria, to the Adriatic Sea in Bellaria–Igea Marina. As of 2021, the town numbers approximately 4,000 residents. Located seven Roman miles along the Via Aemilia from Rimini, San Vito is the site of the Ponte di San Vito, a monumental Roman bridge, which Riminese historians have claimed as the place where Julius Caesar crossed the Rubicon.

== History ==
San Vito lies on the Via Aemilia, an ancient Roman road between Ariminum (modern Rimini) and Placentia (Piacenza) that dates to Marcus Aemilius Lepidus in 187 BC. The section of the Via Aemilia between Savignano sul Rubicone and Santa Giustina, now known as the Via Emilia Vecchia, replaced an earlier routing of the road through Santarcangelo di Romagna. A milestone found in San Vito in 1949 records the town as 7 Roman miles from Ariminum, and attributes the restoration of the road to the commission of Roman emperor Augustus in 2 BC. San Vito is on the right bank of the river Uso, which flows from Perticara, a frazione of Novafeltria, to the Adriatic Sea in Bellaria–Igea Marina.

The parish of San Vito is first mentioned in the Bavarian Code, a register of investitures of the church in Ravenna, in 889 AD. A papal bull of 1144 records the parishes of Santa Giustina and San Giovenale as dependent on San Vito. In a list of Rimini's parishes by Giovanni Battista Castelli, Bishop of Rimini, dated 13 June 1571, five parishes are listed as dependent on San Vito: Santa Giustina, San Martino in Riparotta, San Giovenale, San Martino in Bordonchio, and Santa Margherita di Bellaere. At the end of the 16th century, it became the seat of the vicariate between the Via Aemilia and the Adriatic coast, which it would remain until the diocesan reorganisation of 1964.

In 1913, San Vito numbered 2,359 inhabitants. Its new parish priest, Don Giovanni Marconi, founded San Vito's Cassa Rurale di Depositi e Prestiti on 25 March 1914.

== Main sights ==
The current parish church of San Vito e Modesto dates to the 18th century. The town's cemetery measures 6,000 square metres (65,000 square feet) in size. The town also contains a Bailey bridge over the Uso, which connects the town to homes near via Covignano.

=== Roman bridge ===
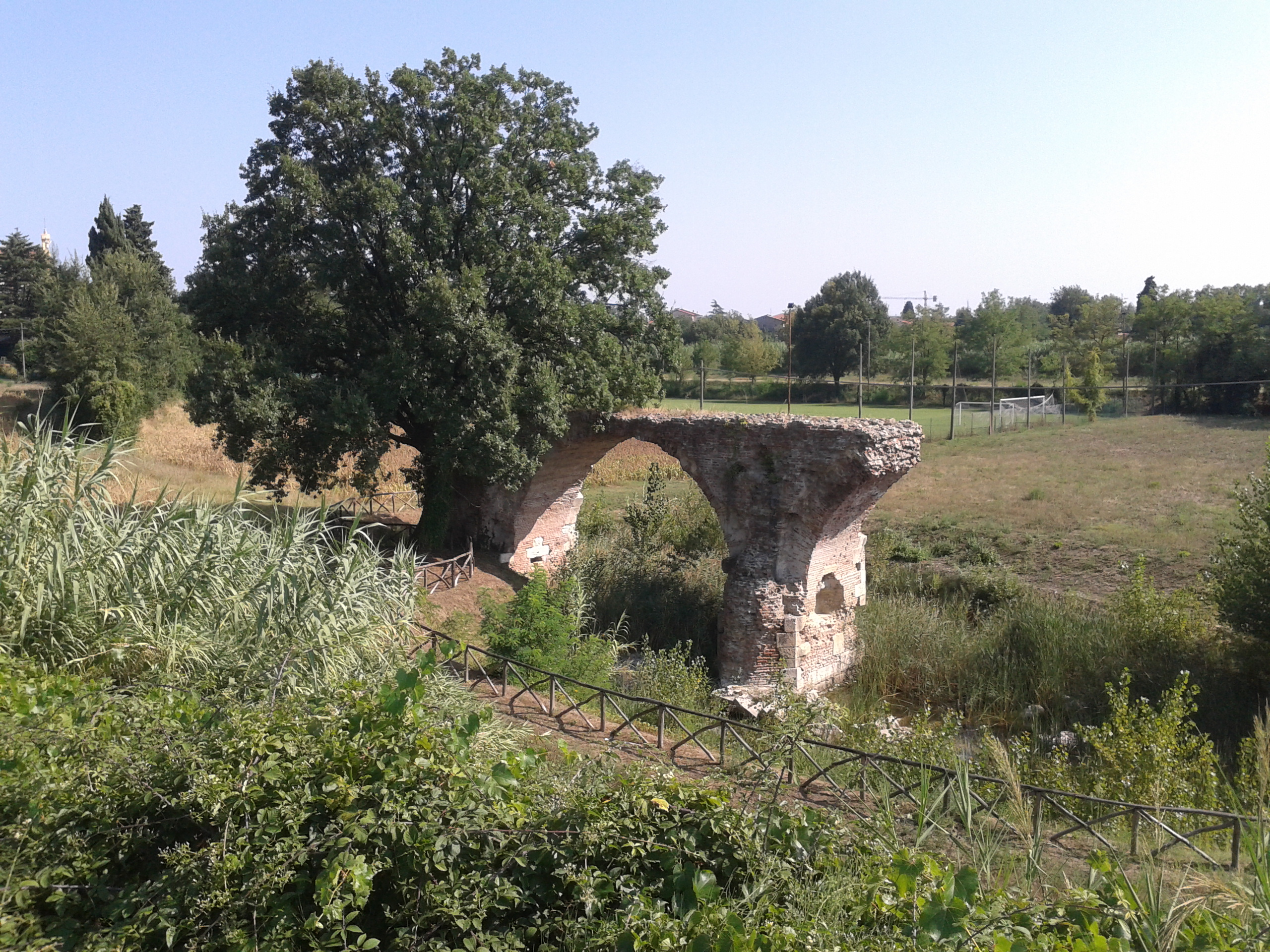
The extant arch of the Ponte di San Vito, August 2013

The Ponte di San Vito was a Roman bridge dating to the reign of Augustus. In the 14th century, Galeotto I Malatesta, Lord of Rimini, replaced the bridge; an arch of the medieval bridge remains extant above the Augustan stones. The stones of the bridges, prized for their excellent quality, were quarried over subsequent centuries, contributing also to restorations of Rimini's Ponte di Tiberio. In October 2022, Rimini's municipal government incorporated the extant arch into a public park. The Augustan bridge was likely monumental, with a total length of approximately 90 metres (300 feet), and numbering eight or more arches. In recent centuries, Riminese historians have claimed the bridge as the place where Julius Caesar crossed the Rubicon.

=== Sanctuary of Madonna di Casale ===
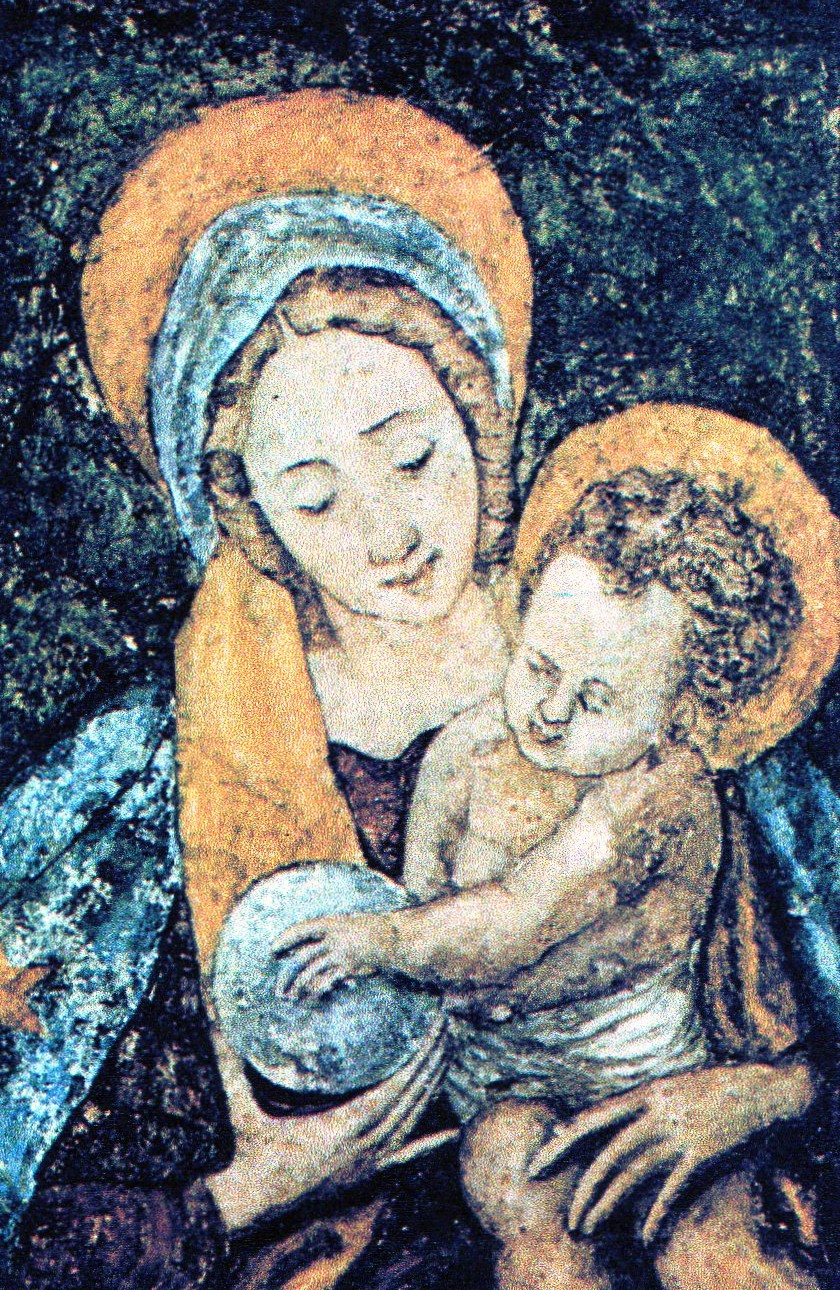
The Madonna di Casale, painted by Baldassarre Pasolini in 1593

On the Via Aemilia between San Vito and Santa Giustina is a seventeenth-century Marian shrine, the Sanctuary of Madonna di Casale, locally renowned for its Virgin and Child fresco. The fresco was painted in 1593 by Baldassarre Pasolini from Longiano, and measured 130 centimetres (51 inches) by 110 centimetres (43 inches). In June 1596, the first miracle was attributed to the fresco: Sebastiano del Duro returned home from unjust imprisonment after his wife, Caterina, was advised by a visiting pilgrim to light a candle by the sanctuary. An abbey church was erected by the shrine in 1602, with six side-chapels.

Since 1878, a Passionist convent has been located by the fresco, at the invitation of Luigi Raffaele Zampetti, Bishop of Rimini. Pio Campidelli, a Blessed of the Catholic Church, lived and studied at the convent between July 1883 and his death on 2 November 1889. Campidelli was buried the following day in San Vito's cemetery; his remains were relocated to Casale on 6 May 1923. The sanctuary at Casale was heavily damaged during the Second World War: German soldiers occupied the complex during the advance of the Gothic Line, and blew up the convent in their retreat on 23 September 1944. The explosion destroyed the convent's apse, transept, belltower, and religious house, as well as most of the fresco. Campidelli's tomb remained intact. In 1969, the convent was rebuilt.

== Transport ==
San Vito is the closest settlement to the Rimini Nord junction of the A14 tolled highway. As of January 2024, the town is served by Start Romagna SpA's Route 9A bus, which begins in San Vito and serves Santa Giustina, the Monumental Cemetery of Rimini, and Rimini's city centre, continuing parallel to the Via Flaminia to serve Rimini's southern suburbs, including Federico Fellini International Airport. Route 92, also operated by Start Romagna SpA, runs as a school bus between Santarcangelo and the schools complex in Viserba through San Vito.

== Notable people ==
- Pio Campidelli (1868–89), Blessed of the Catholic Church, studied, died, and was buried in San Vito
- Pascal Tosi (1835–98), Jesuit and missionary to Alaska, was born in San Vito
