= Ponte di San Vito =

Roman bridge near Rimini, Italy

Bridge of San Vito Italian: Ponte di San Vito
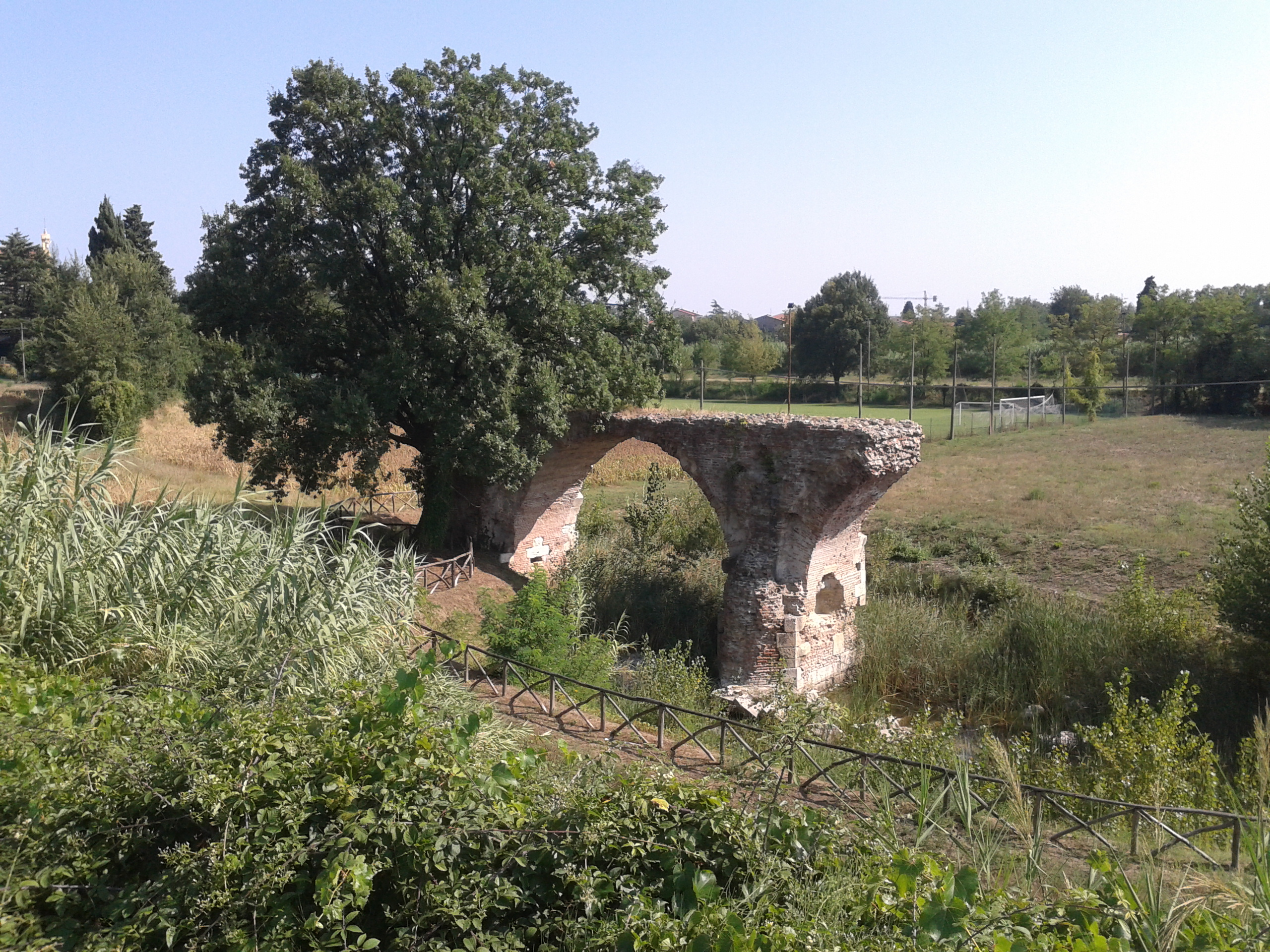
- The extant arch, August 2013
- Coordinates: 44°5′11.62″N 12°27′12.49″E
- Crosses: Uso
- Locale: San Vito, Italy
- Other name(s): Pontaccio (Romagnol: e Puntaz, lit. 'ugly bridge')
- Owner: Comune di Rimini

Characteristics
- Design: Arch bridge
- Material: Istrian stone; Veronese limestone
- Total length: c. 90 metres (300 feet)
- No. of spans: at least 8

History
- Built: c. 2 BC
- Rebuilt: 14th century

Location
- Interactive map of Bridge of San Vito

The Roman Bridge of San Vito (Italian: Ponte romano di San Vito), also locally known as the Pontaccio (Romagnol: e Puntaz, lit. 'ugly bridge'), was a Roman bridge in San Vito, a frazione on the borders of Rimini, Santarcangelo di Romagna, and San Mauro Pascoli, in the region of Emilia-Romagna, northern Italy.

Dating to the reign of emperor Augustus, the bridge was on a route of the Via Aemilia, the ancient Roman road running between Ariminum (modern Rimini) and Placentia (Piacenza). The bridge crossed the river Uso, which now flows a few metres to the east. In the 14th century, Galeotto I Malatesta, Lord of Rimini, replaced the bridge; an arch of the medieval bridge remains extant above the Augustan stones. The stones of the bridges, prized for their excellent quality, were quarried over subsequent centuries, contributing also to restorations of Rimini's Ponte di Tiberio. In October 2022, Rimini's municipal government incorporated the extant arch into a public park.

The Augustan bridge was likely monumental, with a total length of approximately 90 metres (300 feet), and numbering eight or more arches. In recent centuries, Riminese historians have claimed the bridge as the place where Julius Caesar crossed the Rubicon.

== History ==
=== Construction and collapse ===
The Ponte di San Vito was almost certainly built during the reign of Roman emperor Augustus, given both the stones and a milestone recovered a few metres from the bridge in 1949, which attributes the restoration of the road to Augustus' commission in 2 BC. It was built on the Via Aemilia, an ancient Roman road between Ariminum (modern Rimini) and Placentia (Piacenza) that dates to Marcus Aemilius Lepidus in 187 BC. The section of the Via Aemilia between Savignano sul Rubicone and Santa Giustina, now known as the Via Emilia Vecchia, replaced an earlier routing of the road through Santarcangelo di Romagna. The Augustan bridge likely replaced an earlier bridge. It crossed the river Uso, which flows from Perticara, a frazione of Novafeltria, to the Adriatic Sea in Bellaria–Igea Marina. The river now flows a few metres to the bridge's east.

In the 14th century, Galeotto I Malatesta, Lord of Rimini, replaced the Augustan bridge in an effort to reduce the importance of Santarcangelo, which had become a vicariate under the Avignon popes. An arch of the medieval bridge remains extant above the Augustan stones.

In later centuries, following the medieval bridge's collapse, San Vito was renowned as a quarry, using the stones from the Augustan bridge, which were notable for their excellent quality. The stones were used to repave the floor of Rimini's Santa Colomba cathedral, and may also have been used for the construction of the Tempio Malatestiano. In 1550, Leandro Alberti wrote in his Descrittione di tutta Italia that "there was anciently here on the Via Emilia a stone bridge ... of which the vestiges appear to this day".

In 1680, Agostino Martinelli, an amateur Ferrarese architect entrusted with restoring an arch of Rimini's Ponte d'Augusto, recovered blocks of white Aurisina limestone from the river at San Vito; the blocks were identical to those of the Riminese bridge. In 1735, Giulio Alberoni allowed further "marbles that remain of the ancient ruins ... that are now uselessly underwater" to be removed for the restoration of the Ponte d'Augusto.

Until the Second World War, during dry seasons, the remains of a limestone block, known as le Genghe, rose from the Uso's riverbed; the block was used by San Vito's women to wash clothes. It was located a few dozen metres from the extant arch. In 1959, an excavation by Riccardo Gizdulich identified the bridge as medieval.

=== Modern excavation and preservation ===
In 1988, local historian Giovanni Rimondini published a collection of evidence for the Augustan bridge. The collection was followed by an archaeological excavation in 2004, commissioned by Rimini's municipal government and led by local archaeologist Marcello Cartoceti, at the urging of the local parish priest. The excavation uncovered the remains of the Augustan bridge underneath the surviving medieval arch. The first trench of the excavation proceeded from an extant structure towards the river, uncovering only earth and gravel. A second trench towards the village church uncovered a breakwater spur that suggested that the startpoint was a pier. Exposing the upstream part of the spur, the excavation uncovered regularly-shaped stones from the Roman bridge, and a medieval pier a few centimetres below the original trench.

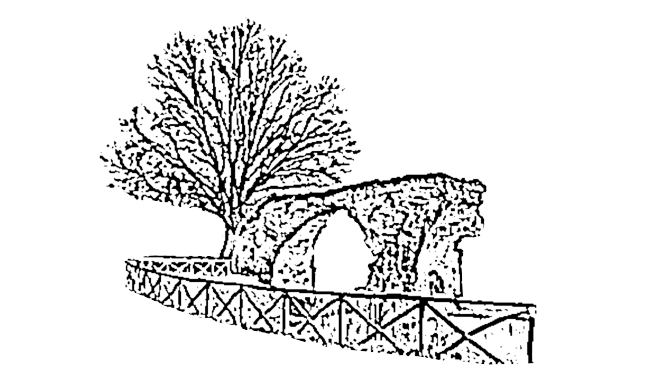
An illustration of the extant arch, May 2021

Beginning in the 2000s, Rimini's municipal government purchased the area around the arch in two stages. In 2021, it announced that it would redevelop the area, providing it with public access and enabling summer recreational initiatives. Local residents had requested that the bridge become a cultural space for over twenty years. The following year, excavations associated with the redevelopment recovered paving of the Via Aemilia. On 16 October 2022, the redevelopment was inaugurated Jamil Sadegholvaad, Rimini's mayor. The extant arch is surrounded by a circular walkway, and is accessible from the village church. The paths are lit by night.

== Architecture ==
The bridge is made of white limestone blocks from Aurisina, known as Istrian stone. It also used ammonitic red limestone blocks from Verona, similar to those used as a foundation slab in the Augustan bridge at Savignano sul Rubicone.

The bridge's total length was likely approximately 90 metres (300 feet), longer than Rimini's Ponte di Tiberio, as also suggested by the number of recovered stones. In 2019, to explain the bridge's length, Rimondini hypothesised that there may have been two bridges, crossing the Uso at different meanders, to which Cartoceti replied that, locally, the Romans more commonly built one large bridge over wide rivers than two separate ones.

An 1825 sketch by local engineer Maurizio Brighenti indicated the area where the foundations of the bridge's piers would emerge from the riverbed during dry seasons. The sketch suggested that the bridge numbered eight or more arches, ending on the right bank of the present-day Uso. After being published by Rimondini, Brighenti's sketches were lost in Forlì's state archives.

The 2004 excavation suggested that two arches had a diameter of at least 5.6 metres (18 feet), while the pier had a thickness of 2.9 metres (9.5 feet).

== Rubicon hypothesis ==
=== Overview ===
For historians that identify the Uso with Julius Caesar's historic crossing of the Rubicon in 49 BC, which opened Caesar's civil war, the Ponte di San Vito would have been the point of Caesar's crossing. With the exception of Luigi Tonini, most Riminese local historians favoured the Uso's claim over that of Savignano di Romagna's Fiumicino and the Pisciatello, a tributary of the Fiumincino that flows nearer Cesena. Local historians and archaeologists have advocated further archaeological excavation of the Ponte di San Vito to understand these uncertainties.

Other supporters of the Uso's claim contend that the point of Caesar's crossing was not San Vito, but by a pine forest near the Uso's mouth at Bellaria, along the Via Popilia.

=== History ===
Writing about San Vito in 1681, Martinelli, who restored the Ponte di Tiberio, marvelled that such a grand bridge had been built for "a small stream to be crossed with jumps". He opined:

If I did not know of the unsettled controversy about determining which was the famous ancient Rubicon, I would almost dare say it was this one, where the stones were removed, because it is believable, that in the place where foreign arms were to be avoided, there was, as was customary for the ancient Roman Generosity, a grand structure, in which the Decree was inscribed in large characters, for it is certain, that a grand limit had to be assigned, that made a firm point to the passage of enemy arms, whether this was the Bridge, which curved over the same Rubicon, or another grand structure on the banks of the same.

— Agostino Martinelli, 1681

In Alberoni's 1735 grant for more stones to be removed from the quarry, the bridge at San Vito is called "the ancient ruins of the Bridge of the Rubicon River vulgarly called the Uso that are uselessly underwater".

On 4 August 1933, the government of Benito Mussolini, Italy's fascist dictator, by the decree of Victor Emmanuel III, renamed Savignano as Savignano del Rubicone, according government support to the Fiumicino's claim. Despite the official support for the Fiumincino, which was renamed the Rubicon, local historians continued to debate the site of the ancient river, believing that the decision was arbitrary and politically motivated. In the post-war years, Augusto Campana, a local historian who wrote on the Via Emilia, expressed interest in San Vito's claim.

In the early 21st century, interest in the Ponte di San Vito revitalised support for the Uso's claim. In March–April 2013, an article by Rimondini in Ariminum, the local history and culture publication of Rimini's Rotary Club, revisited San Vito's claim. Coincidentally, Daisuke Konishi, a journalist from Kyodo News, was finishing a report on the Rubicon's historical claimants. San Vito's claim was consequently featured in several reports in the national and international press, including Avvenire, Il Resto del Carlino, La Voce, and several Japanese newspapers. In August 2013, the different river's claimants were showcased in a mock trial in San Mauro Pascoli, leading to further press coverage.

In July 2018, a play on Caesar's trial was reenacted at the bridge. In November 2019, Rimini's Rotary Club hosted a conference on San Vito's claim in Rimini's Museo della Città.

=== Supporting evidence ===
French archaeogeographer Gérard Chouquer identified the Uso as the western bank of the Marecchia's alluvial fan, and suspected that this was likely the extremity of Rimini's centuriation, and therefore the borders of the Roman colonia between its foundational years of 286 BC and 171 BC. The Rubicon was the limes (limit) of Cisalpine Gaul.

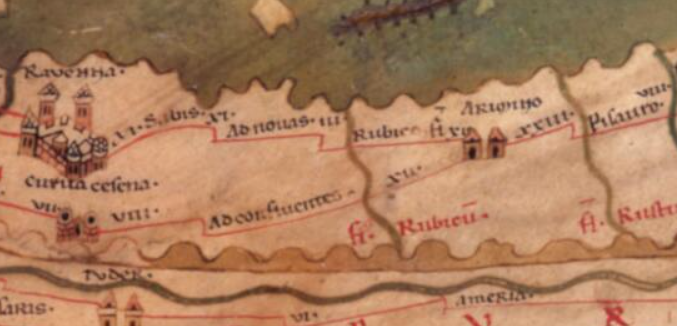
Detail of the Tabula Peutingeriana around the Rubicon

The milestone recovered in 1949 records 7 Roman miles from Ariminum. In the Tabula Peutingeriana, the Rubicon is marked between Ad confluentes (identified with San Giovanni in Compito) on its left bank and 12 Roman miles on its right bank. Assuming that both markers refer to Ad confluentes, then if the label for Ad confluentes is understood to refer to a settlement on the western bank of the Rubicon, then the Fiumicino between San Giovanni in Compito and Savignano is a prime candidate for the Rubicon. If instead the label is understood to refer to a settlement at a jump in the road further west of the Rubicon rather than a settlement by the Rubicon, then the Rubicon would lie halfway between Ariminum and Ad confluentes, for which the Uso at San Vito would be a coincidental candidate.

The milestone suggests that the road through San Vito was restored in 2 BC, long after Caesar's crossing. Nevertheless, it is unclear why Augustus rerouted the Via Aemilia through San Vito, which cut out Santarcangelo di Romagna on the preceding Via Aemilia route, with little discernible saving in journey times. Indeed, the river was wider at San Vito than it was near Santarcangelo, where it was crossed by a stone bridge. Commemorating Caesar's crossing in San Vito could be one reason for the road's rerouting, particularly given the monumental nature of the bridge.

San Vito's parish church is first recorded between 889 and 898. Its proximity to the river, which is liable to heavy flooding, suggests it may have guarded some important area considered historically important or sacred.

== See also ==
- List of Roman bridges
- Roman architecture
- Roman engineering
