= Biniam Girmay =

Eritrean cyclist (born 2000)

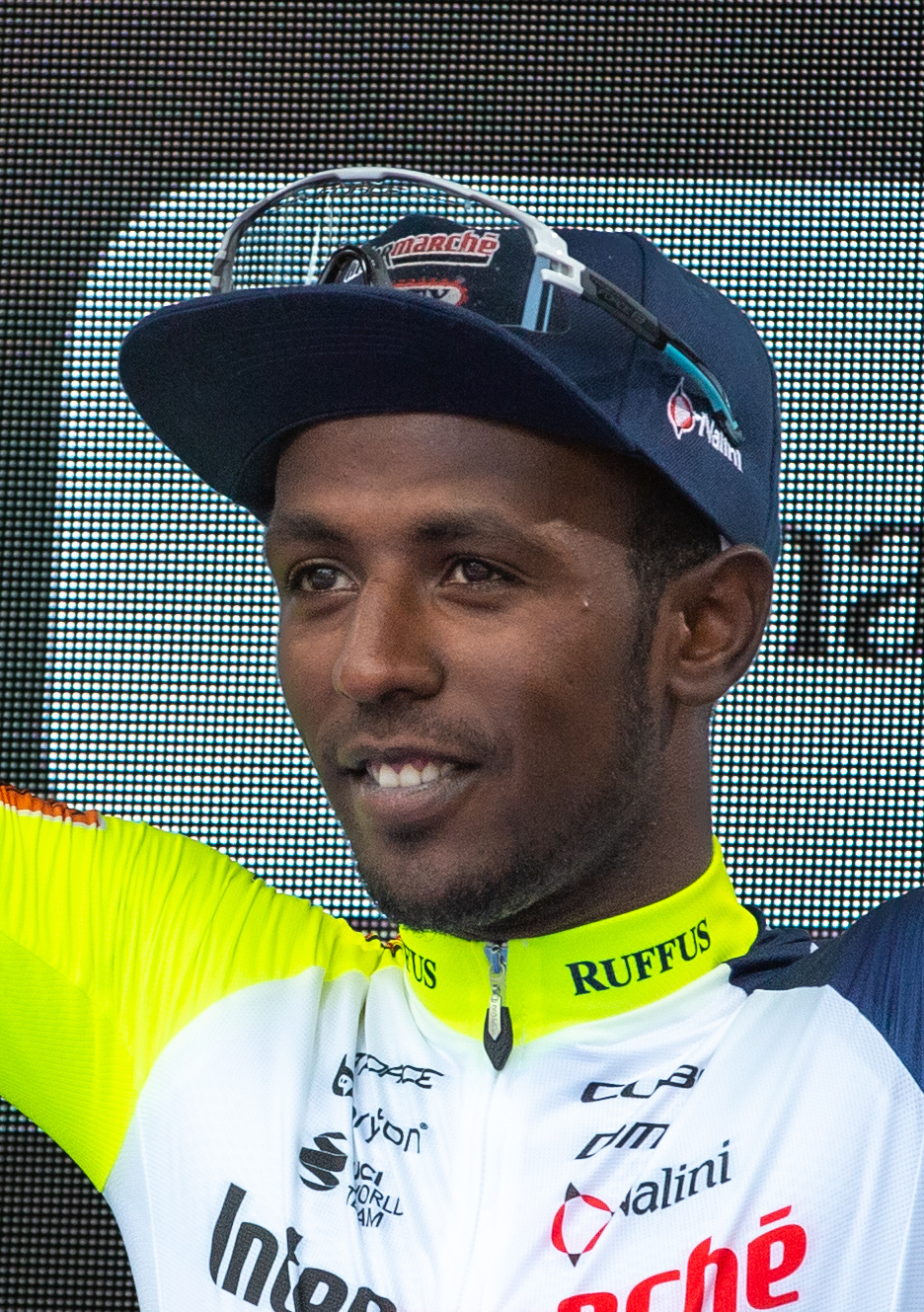
- Girmay at the 2022 GP de Québec

Personal information
- Full name: Biniam Girmay Hailu
- Nickname: Bini
- Born: 2 April 2000 (age 26) Asmara, Eritrea
- Height: 1.85 m (6 ft 1 in)
- Weight: 74 kg (163 lb)

Cycling career
- Sport: Cycling
- Current team: NSN Cycling Team
- Discipline: Road
- Role: Rider
- Rider type: Classics specialist; Sprinter; Puncheur

Amateur team
- 2018–2019: World Cycling Centre

Professional teams
- 2020–2021: Nippo–Delko–One Provence
- 2021–2025: Intermarché–Wanty–Gobert Matériaux
- 2026–: NSN Cycling Team

Major wins
- Grand Tours Tour de France Points classification (2024) 3 individual stages (2024) Giro d'Italia 1 individual stage (2022) One-day races and Classics National Time Trial Championships (2022) Gent–Wevelgem (2022) Circuit Franco-Belge (2024) Clásica de Almería (2026)
Medal record
Representing Eritrea
Men's road bicycle racing
World Championships
Silver medal – second place	2021 Flanders	Under-23 road race

Biniam Girmay Hailu (born 2 April 2000) is an Eritrean professional road cyclist who rides for UCI WorldTeam NSN Cycling Team. At the 2022 Giro d'Italia, he became the first black African cyclist to win a Grand Tour stage after winning stage 10 in a reduced bunch sprint. At the 2024 Tour de France, Biniam won the Green Jersey becoming the first African to win any jersey at the Tour. At the same Tour, he became the first black African rider to win a Tour de France stage – he won stages 3, 8, and 12.

== Career ==
=== Early life and career ===
Biniam was born on 2 April 2000 in Asmara, the second son to his father Girmay Hailu, a carpenter, and his mother Freweyni. He comes from a cycling family, having watched the Tour de France with his father on television each year; both his brother and his cousin, Meron Teshome, are also professional cyclists.

At 12 years old, Biniam won his first mountain bike competition, and in his teens he was selected to represent Eritrea as a junior in the African Championships, where he attracted the attention of a UCI scout, who invited him to train at the World Cycling Centre in Switzerland.

Biniam left Eritrea and moved to Switzerland to join the WCC in 2018 for his second junior year. That year, he became a triple junior cycling champion of Africa, winning the road race, time trial and team time trial. He also won the first stage of Aubel–Thimister–Stavelot, beating favourite Remco Evenepoel.

In 2019, with the Eritrea national team, he won the third stage in a sprint of the La Tropicale Amissa Bongo, his first professional victory. This made Biniam the first cyclist born in the 2000s to win a professional race. His success continued, winning stage 5 of the Tour du Rwanda in a sprint against experienced riders, including Joseph Areruya and Daniel Turek who finished 2nd and 3rd.

For the 2020 season, Biniam joined UCI ProTeam Nippo–Delko–One Provence, with whom he finished second in the Trofeo Laigueglia and the Tour du Doubs.

=== Intermarché–Wanty (2021–2025) ===
After he was let go by Delko (who subsequently folded) earlier in the year, Intermarché–Wanty–Gobert Matériaux announced his signing on 6 August 2021. He debuted for his new team days later at the Tour de Pologne. On 24 September 2021, he finished second in the under-23 road race at the UCI Road World Championships, becoming the first black African rider to achieve a podium finish in the history of the UCI Road World Championships.

==== 2022 ====
On 27 March 2022, in Gent–Wevelgem, Biniam was part of the winning breakaway, which also included Christophe Laporte, Jasper Stuyven, and Dries Van Gestel. In the finale, he was the first to launch his sprint, coming from the back of the group, and held on for the victory. In doing so, he became the first African winner of a classic cycle race.

Later that season, Biniam rode his first Grand Tour at the Giro d'Italia. On stage 1, he finished second to Mathieu van der Poel in an uphill sprint. Towards the next eight stages, he amassed four top five finishes in bunch sprints as well as a breakaway stage. On stage 10, in a reduced bunch sprint, he outsprinted van der Poel in a long sprint to win his first Grand Tour stage. He became the first black African cyclist to win a stage at a Grand Tour. However, at the podium, as Biniam was opening the bottle of Prosecco, the wine cork hit his left eye at full speed. He was checked by race and team doctors before being sent to the hospital for treatment. The following day, Biniam confirmed that he would abandon the Giro in order to let his eye injury fully heal.

==== 2023 ====
Biniam began the 2023 season racing in Spain, and had his first win of the year on stage 1 of the Volta a la Comunitat Valenciana. After a lack of results in the spring, he won the second stage of the Tour de Suisse, outsprinting Arnaud Démare and Wout van Aert. He entered his first Tour de France in 2023 as the team leader for Intermarché–Circus–Wanty, placing third in a sprint finish on stage 7. He was one of only two African riders alongside Louis Meintjes as well as the only black rider to compete in the race.

==== 2024 ====
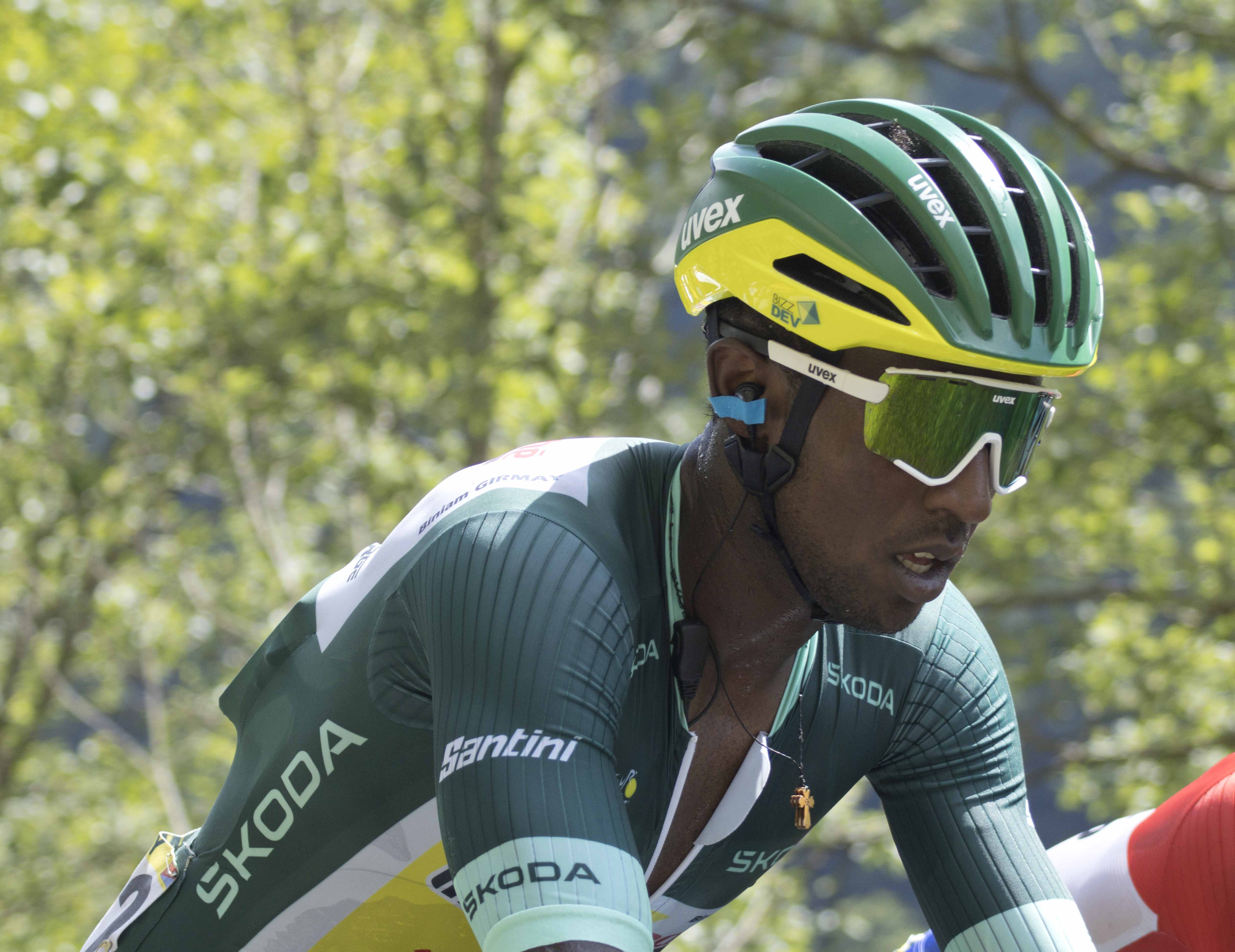
Biniam in the green jersey of the points classification at the 2024 Tour de France

Biniam began his 2024 season at the 2024 Tour Down Under, where he finished second in the points classification. A week later, he obtained his first victory of the season at the Surf Coast Classic in a bunch sprint beating Elia Viviani and Corbin Strong. Biniam was announced as the team leader for Intermarché–Wanty for the 2024 Giro d'Italia. He completed three stages before crashing twice on the rainy fourth day and abandoning the race with a hip injury. He was able to return to racing 10 days later and, in late May, won the Circuit Franco-Belge in a sprint.

He rode in the Tour de France again in 2024 and won the third stage in a bunch sprint. He became the first black African to win a stage at the Tour. After stage 5 of the race, Biniam took the lead in the points classification, marking the first time that an African rider has worn the green jersey in the Tour. He took home the win in stage 8 of the race, narrowly beating reigning points classification winner Jasper Philipsen and marking his second stage win in the Tour. Biniam won stage 12 of the Tour for his third stage win, beating Wout Van Aert in the sprint finish. He maintained his lead over Phillipsen all the way to Nice to secure the points classification with a 33-point advantage. Two days later, he and Intermarche-Wanty announced they had signed a new contract keeping him at the team until the end of 2028, while preparing himself for the 2024's men's road race at the Olympics.

=== NSN Cycling Team ===
On January 1, 2026, Biniam signed a three-year contract with NSN Cycling Team, moving from Intermarché-Wanty. The transfer came as NSN, the rebranded team formerly known as Israel-Premier Tech, announced its 2026 roster and unveiled a new team kit in Barcelona. Biniam joined a squad of approximately 28 riders that includes George Bennett, Alexey Lutsenko, and Stephen Williams.

At his first race of the season, Biniam won the opening stage of the Volta a la Comunitat Valenciana, ending his dry spell he had since his green jersey win at the 2024 Tour de France.

== Personal life ==
Biniam Girmay lives in Leuven, Belgium while in Europe. He has been married to Saliem Hizkel since 2021. The couple welcomed their first child in the same year.

Biniam regularly attended church when living in Eritrea, and gave thanks to God after his third Tour de France win, remarking 'without God we cannot do anything'.

== Major results ==
2018
African Junior Road Championships

1st Road race
1st Time trial
1st Team time trial

2nd Overall Grand Prix Rüebliland
3rd Overall Aubel–Thimister–Stavelot

1st Stage 1

3rd Trofeo Comune di Vertova
4th Trofeo Emilio Paganessi
2019 (2 pro wins)
1st Stage 3 La Tropicale Amissa Bongo
1st Stage 5 Tour du Rwanda
2020 (2)
La Tropicale Amissa Bongo

1st Points classification
1st Stages 3 & 6

2nd Trofeo Laigueglia
2nd Tour du Doubs
4th Giro della Toscana
2021 (1)
1st Classic Grand Besançon Doubs
2nd Road race, UCI Road World Under-23 Championships
2nd Tour du Doubs
5th Gran Piemonte
5th Route Adélie
6th La Roue Tourangelle
7th La Drôme Classic
7th Druivenkoers Overijse
7th Tour du Jura
9th Trofeo Laigueglia
2022 (4)
1st Time trial, National Road Championships
1st Gent–Wevelgem
1st Trofeo Alcúdia–Port d'Alcúdia
Giro d'Italia

1st Stage 10
Held after Stage 1

2nd Grand Prix de Wallonie
3rd Grand Prix Cycliste de Québec
4th Tour du Doubs
5th E3 Saxo Bank Classic
6th Bretagne Classic
7th La Drôme Classic
10th Milano–Torino
2023 (2)
1st Stage 2 Tour de Suisse
1st Stage 1 Volta a la Comunitat Valenciana
2nd Trofeo Palma
3rd Trofeo Ses Salines–Alcúdia
4th Brussels Cycling Classic
7th Grand Prix de Wallonie
7th Paris–Chauny
8th Famenne Ardenne Classic
2024 (5)
1st Circuit Franco-Belge
1st Surf Coast Classic
Tour de France

1st Points classification
1st Stages 3, 8 & 12

2nd Grand Prix Cycliste de Québec
2nd Brussels Cycling Classic
2nd Binche–Chimay–Binche
2nd Rund um Köln
3rd Time trial, National Road Championships
3rd Hamburg Cyclassics
4th Grand Prix de Wallonie
4th Münsterland Giro
7th Gent–Wevelgem
9th Antwerp Port Epic
2025
2nd Classique Dunkerque
2nd Rund um Köln
3rd Grand Prix de Wallonie
4th Trofeo Ses Salines
5th Bretagne Classic
6th Figueira Champions Classic
7th Gent–Wevelgem
8th Hamburg Cyclassics
9th Trofeo Palma
Tour de France

Held after Stage 1

2026 (3)
1st Clásica de Almería
Volta a la Comunitat Valenciana

1st Points classification
1st Stage 1

1st Stage 1 Tour of Belgium
4th Dwars door Vlaanderen

=== Grand Tour general classification results timeline ===
Grand Tour	2022	2023	2024	2025	2026
Giro d'Italia	DNF	—	DNF	—	—
Tour de France	—	125	113	132	141
Vuelta a España	—	—	—	—	—

=== Classics results timeline ===
Monument	2020	2021	2022	2023	2024	2025	2026
Milan–San Remo	—	—	12	28	27	14	108
Tour of Flanders	—	—	—	DNF	59	35	
Paris–Roubaix	NH	—	—	—	—	15	
Liège–Bastogne–Liège	—	—	—	—	—	—	—
Giro di Lombardia	—	—	—	—	—	—	—
Classic	2020	2021	2022	2023	2024	2025	2026
Milano–Torino	—	—	10	18	—	—	—
E3 Saxo Bank Classic	NH	—	5	DNF	19	22	57
Gent–Wevelgem	—	—	1	97	7	7	21
Dwars door Vlaanderen	—	—	—	—	DNF	17	4
Brussels Cycling Classic	—	—	—	4	2	20	
Hamburg Cyclassics	—	—	—	—	3	8	
Bretagne Classic	96	DNF	6	DNF	—	5	
Grand Prix Cycliste de Québec	Not held		3	37	2	23	
Grand Prix Cycliste de Montréal	Not held		DNF	DNF	DNF	DNF	
Paris–Tours	20	—	—	14	—		

Legend
—	Did not compete
DNF	Did not finish
