= Pius of Saint Aloysius =

Italian Roman Catholic cleric

Blessed Pius Campidelli of Saint Aloysius C.P.
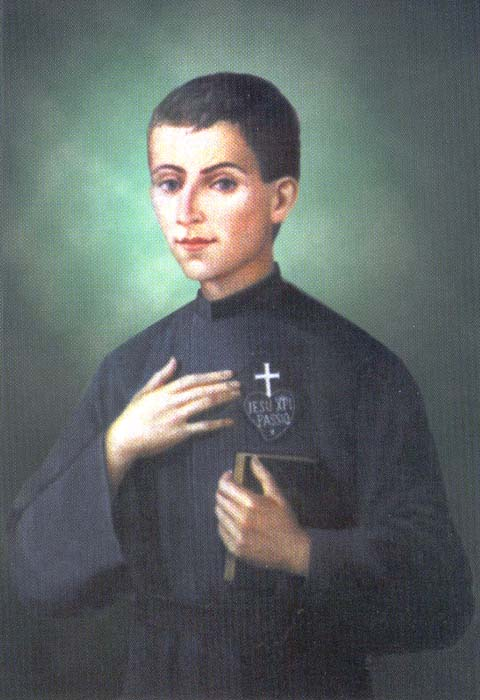

Religious
- Born: 29 April 1868; Trebbio di Poggio Berni, Emilia-Romagna, Kingdom of Italy
- Died: 2 November 1889 (aged 21); San-Vito, Emilia-Romagna, Kingdom of Italy
- Venerated in: Roman Catholic Church
- Beatified: 17 November 1985, Saint Peter's Square, Vatican City by Pope John Paul II
- Major shrine: Sanctuary of Madonna di Casale
- Feast: 2 November; 3 November (Passionists)
- Attributes: Passionist habit
- Patronage: Young people

Pius of Saint Aloysius (born Luigi Campidelli, 29 April 1868 – 2 November 1889) was an Italian Roman Catholic professed cleric from the Passionists. He died before he could receive his ordination to the priesthood but in his short life managed to captivate people around him for his strong dedication to his order's charism and his deep faith.

His beatification was celebrated on 17 November 1985.

== Life ==
Luigi Campidelli was born to an impoverished farmers on 29 April 1868 as the fourth of six children to Giuseppe Campidelli and Filomena Belpani; a sister was Teresa. He was baptized as "Luigi Nazreno Francesco". His parents nicknamed him "Gigino". His father caught typhoid in 1874 and soon died which left his widow and children destitute while an uncle came to their aid to help manage their farm.

He received his Confirmation on 9 February 1873 from the Bishop of Rimini Luigi Poggi and in 1875 enrolled in the private school at Trebbio di Poggio Berni before making his First Communion in 1878. In his schooling he was admired as a good student and devout child and in his teens became more active in the life of his local parish. He was known throughout the neighborhood as a good child who was pious and sincere with an unwavering allegiance to Pope Pius IX who he felt was going through terrible trials due to the loss of the Papal States in 1870. He also taught other children catechism. He encountered the Passionists in 1880 and knew at once that he wanted to join them.

From this time on he was a frequent visitor to the Sanctuary of Madonna di Casale in San Vito and was soon invited to enter their novitiate on 2 May 1882. On 27 May 1883 he was clothed in the Passionist habit and he also received the religious name of "Pius of Saint Aloysius" while beginning the novitiate period. His novitiate was transferred to Viterbo in January 1883 where he continued his theological and philosophical studies at the Sant'Eutizio convent though left later that July back to where he was before. On 30 April 1884 he made his vows and then received the minor orders at the Sant'Eutizio convent in Viterbo. He was struck down with tuberculosis in 1889 before he could be ordained to the priesthood and had suffered from its first signs in 1888. He received the tonsure on 17 December 1887.

He died on 2 November 1889 at 10:30pm and had offered his life for his troubled home region of Romagna. His remains were buried in San Vito and then on 6 May 1923 were moved to the Sanctuary of Madonna di Casale. His remains were exhumed on 17 June 1985 for canonical inspection as part of the beatification process and were found to be in a state of good preservation.

== Beatification ==
The beatification process opened in the Rimini diocese in 1924 in an informative process that concluded in 1928. Pius's spiritual writings were deemed to be appropriate and therefore approved on 17 July 1928; the formal introduction to the cause came later under Pope Pius XI on 5 January 1938 and he became titled as a Servant of God. An apostolic process was later held in Rimini from 1939 until 1941. The two processes received validation in Rome from the Congregation for Rites on 13 April 1945. The Congregation for the Causes of Saints and their consultants approved the cause on 4 May 1982 as did the C.C.S. alone later on 26 January 1983. The recognition of the late cleric's heroic virtue allowed for Pope John Paul II to title him as Venerable on 21 March 1983.

The informative process for the miracle for beatification - the healing of the nun Maria Foschi - opened in the Italian diocese of origin on 4 July 1940 and closed later on 4 September 1941 before receiving C.O.R. validation on 13 April 1945. Medical experts approved the sister's healing was a miracle on 6 December 1984 as did theologians on 11 April 1985 and the C.C.S. on 21 May 1985. John Paul II approved this miracle on 6 July 1985 and beatified the Passionist cleric on 17 November 1985.

The current postulator for this cause is the Passionist priest Giovanni Zubiani.
