= Arco Ganganelli =

Coordinates: 44°03′48″N 12°26′49″E

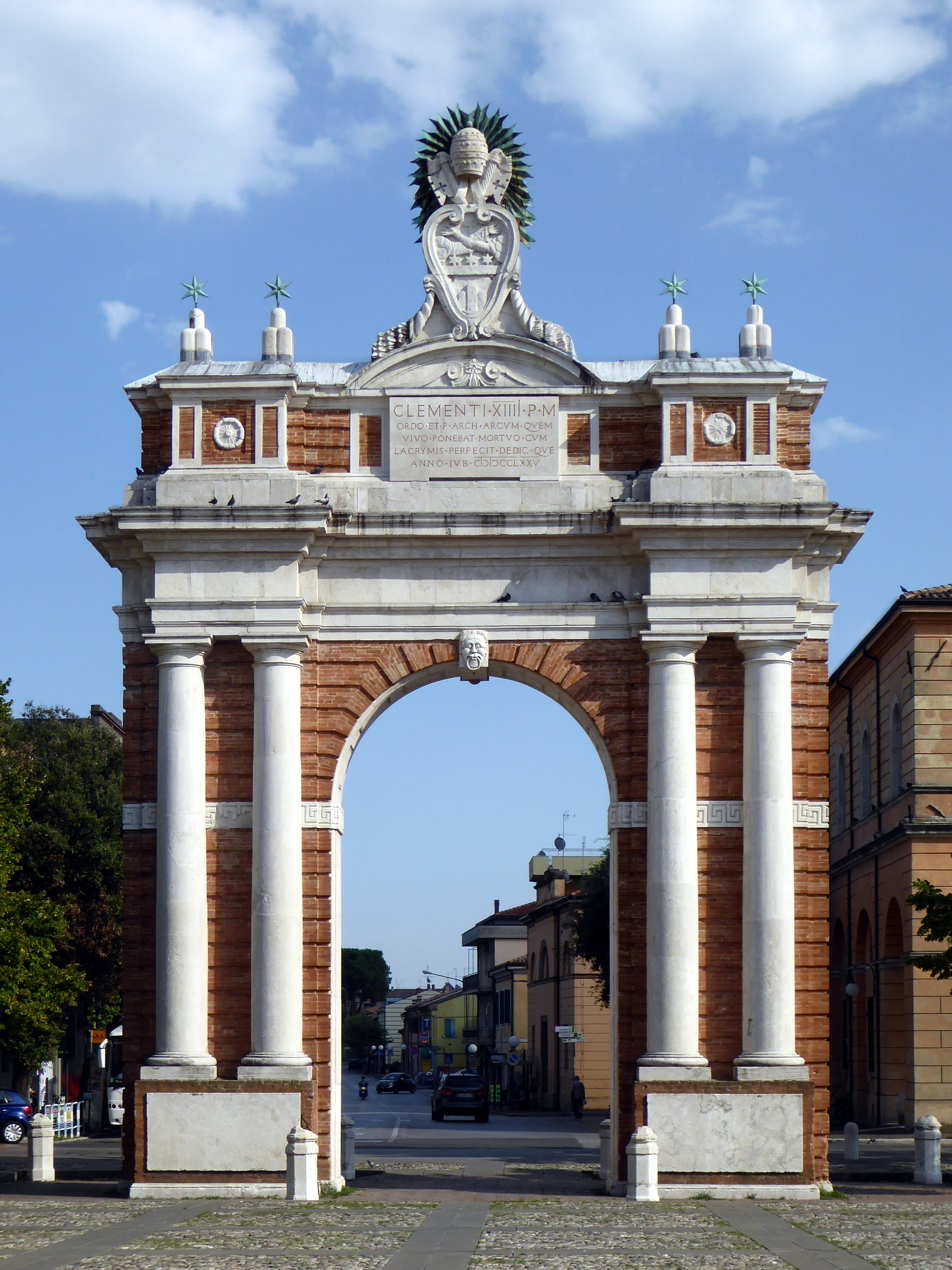
Arch

The Arch of Ganganelli (Italian: Arco di Ganganelli) or Arco di Papa Clemente XIV is a triumphal arch that stands in the town of Santarcangelo di Romagna, Emilia-Romagna, Italy. It was constructed in 1772–1777 to celebrate the elevation in 1769 of the native Cardinal Lorenzo Ganganelli to become Pope Clement XIV. Designed by the architect Cosimo Morelli, the arch led into town through the via Emilia, and until the early 21st century, allowed cars to drive through. The monument was meant to have a marble statue of the pope atop the center, but the statue, sculpted by Antonio Canova, was instead used for the Tomb of Pope Clement XIV in the Basilica of the Holy Apostles in Rome.

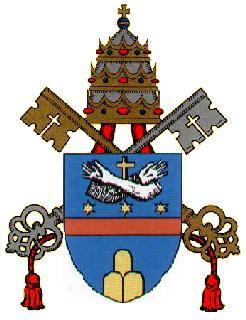
Coat of arms of Clement

Atop the arch is the papal coat of arms of Clement, which consist from top to bottom, of a papal tiara flanked by two keys, In the upper register are the crossed arms, symbol of the Franciscan order, to which Clement belonged. Below are three eight point stars over a trimount argent (three mountains), symbol of the Virgin Mary as overseeing heavens, land and water. Along the roofline are further trimounts with eight pointed stars.

To the north of the arch, facing the piazza Ganganelli is the Pascucci Elementary school, built at the site of the former Franciscan monastery. On Strada Provinciale 14, just west is the town library (Biblioteca Comunale Antonio Baldini). To the south is the city hall, designed in the mid-1800s by Giovanni Benedettini.

On November 11, during the Festival of San Martino (known as the Fiera dei Becchi [Fair of the Cuckolds]) held in Santarcangelo, large cow horns are traditionally hung in the middle of the arch. According to the popular tradition, if the horns move while you pass under the arch, then the fidelity of your partner is in question.
