= Giovanni Domenico Trifogli =

Italian architect

Giovanni Domenico Trifogli or Trefogli (1675 – 1759) was an Italian architect, active in Imola and Piacenza in a Baroque style.

== Biography ==
He was born in Torricella-Taverne, near Imola. He was the paternal grand uncle of the architect Cosimo Morelli.

== Works ==
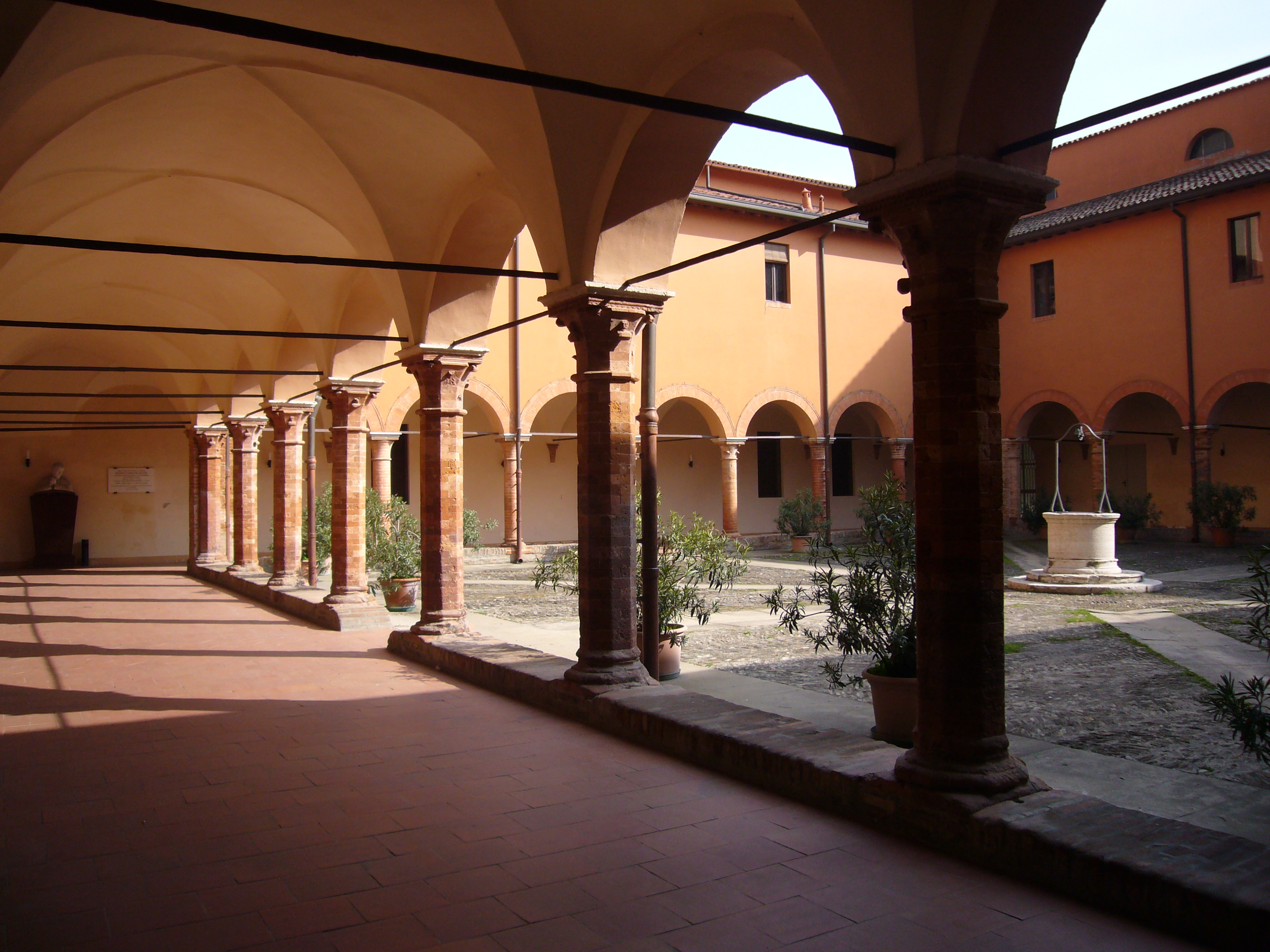
Collegiata di San Francesco di Lugo

- Palazzo Tozzoni, Imola
- Church of San Lazzaro e Vincenzo de Paoli, Piacenza
- Convent of Santo Stefano, Imola, where he worked with Felice Magistretti
- Refurbishment of Santa Maria della Misericordia and the Palazzo Pubblico
- Stucco-work at Collegiata di San Francesco di Lugo (Ravenna) with his brother in law Torricella Piermauricio Giabbani
