= 2026 Clásica de Almería =

2026 UCI ProSeries

Race details
- Dates: 15 February 2026
- Stages: 1
- Distance: 189.7 km (117.9 mi)
- Winning time: 4h 10' 36"

Results
	Winner	Biniam Girmay (ERI)	(NSN Cycling Team)
	Second	Milan Fretin (BEL)	(Cofidis)
	Third	Matteo Moschetti (ITA)	(Pinarello–Q36.5 Pro Cycling Team)

The 2026 Clásica de Almería is the 41st edition of the Clásica de Almería one-day road cycling race. It was being held on 15 February 2026 as a category 1. Pro race on the 2026 UCI ProSeries.

== Teams ==
Six UCI WorldTeams and thiteen UCI ProTeams made up the nineteen teams that participated in the race.

UCI WorldTeams

- Groupama–FDJ United
- Lotto–Intermarché
- Movistar Team
- NSN Cycling Team
- Team Bahrain Victorious
- Team Jayco–AlUla

UCI ProTeams

- Bardiani–CSF 7 Saber
- Burgos Burpellet BH
- Caja Rural–Seguros RGA
- Cofidis
- Equipo Kern Pharma
- Euskaltel–Euskadi
- MBH Bank CSB Telecom Fort
- Pinarello–Q36.5 Pro Cycling Team
- Team Flanders–Baloise
- Team Polti VisitMalta
- Team TotalEnergies
- Tudor Pro Cycling Team
- Unibet Rose Rockets

== Result ==
Result (1–10)
Rank	Rider	Team	Time
1	Biniam Girmay (ERI)	NSN Cycling Team	4h 10' 36"
2	Milan Fretin (BEL)	Cofidis	+ 0"
3	Matteo Moschetti (ITA)	Pinarello–Q36.5 Pro Cycling Team	+ 0"
4	Dylan Groenewegen (NED)	Unibet Rose Rockets	+ 0"
5	Phil Bauhaus (GER)	Team Bahrain Victorious	+ 0"
6	Arnaud De Lie (BEL)	Lotto–Intermarché	+ 0"
7	Enrico Zanoncello (ITA)	Bardiani–CSF 7 Saber	+ 0"
8	Pascal Ackermann (GER)	Team Jayco–AlUla	+ 0"
9	Manuel Peñalver (ESP)	Team Polti VisitMalta	+ 0"
10	Fernando Gaviria (COL)	Caja Rural–Seguros RGA	+ 0"
