= Cosimo Morelli =

Italian architect

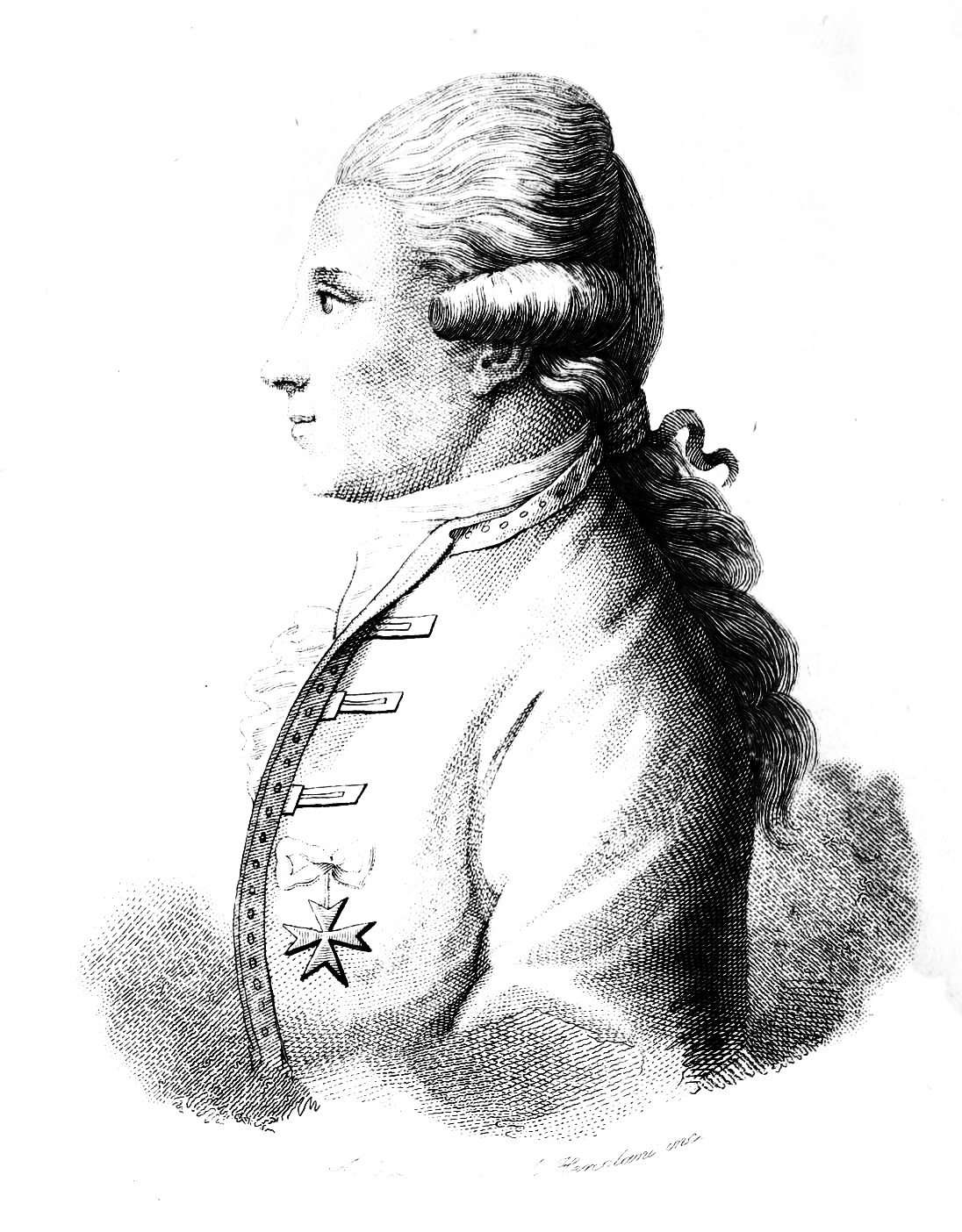

Cosimo Morelli (1732 – 26 February 1812) was an Italian architect, active throughout the Papal States in a Neoclassic style.

== Biography ==
He was born at Imola. His father, also an architect, studied under Giovanni Domenico Trifogli. Cosimo is said to have studied geometry under Vincenzo Savini. Boni says of that Morelli was of a: vast genius, and enterprising, he advanced rapidly in his new career; firm of character, pleasant tract, witty expression, he obtained the affection and esteem of many illustrious person.

Morelli was the most prolific architect during the Pontifical States of the mid-18th century. He was knighted by Pius IX, thanks mostly to his relationship with the Roman curia and his ability to interpret and develop the tastes of his epoch. Under the tutelage of Pope Pius VII, Morelli built, renovated, and amplified numerous civic and religious buildings. He designed the Arco Ganganelli in Santarcangelo, Romagna. His fame, beyond his talent, was partly due to employing a “team” of artisans and painters in his commissions, such as Alessandro Dalla Nave, Antonio Villa and Angelo Gottarelli, among others.

He died at Imola in 1812.

== Works ==
- Chiesa di San Prospero in Imola, finished on 4 September 1836, for Bishop Giovanni Maria Mastai-Ferretti, who would later become Pope Pius IX, in 1846.
- Palazzo Braschi in Rome, on Piazza Navona and Corso Vittorio Emanuele II, built for Duke Luigi Braschi Onesti, nephew of Pius IX, which used to be a former palazzo for the Orsini family. Today it houses the Museum of Rome.
- Teatro dell'Aquila in Fermo, in 1780, is renowned for its acoustics.
- Teatro Lauro Rossi in Macerata, inaugurated in 1774 and still in use today.
- Palazzo Anguissola di Grazzano in Piacenza

Other works include at the Duomo of Imola, Fermo Cathedral, Fossombrone Cathedral, and Macerata Cathedral, the church of Santo Stefano in Imola, of San Francesco in Lugo; helped rebuild the Main parish of Ravenna, and the facade of San Pietro in Bologna; also the theaters of Iesi, Osimo, Forlì, Ferrara, Tor di Nona in Rome, and others. He helped design the palace of Anguissola in Piacenza, Silvestri in Macerata, and the facade of Palazzo Berio on via Toledo in Naples. He designed the civic hospital of Imola, the seminary of Subiaco, and the triumphal arch erected by San Arcangelo in honour of their fellow native, Clement XIV.
