= Santarcangelo di Romagna =

- Comune
- Comune di Santarcangelo di Romagna
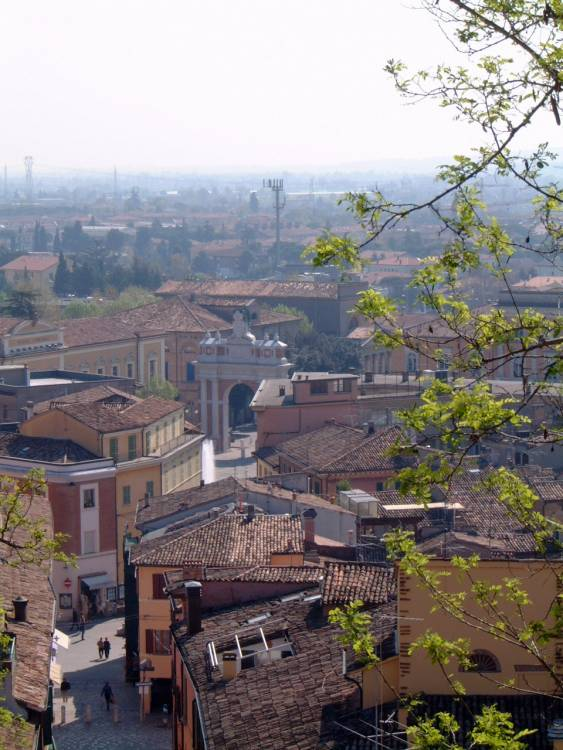

- Coat of arms

- Location within Italy Location within Emilia-Romagna
- Coordinates: 44°04′N 12°27′E
- Country: Italy
- Region: Emilia-Romagna
- Province: Rimini
- Frazioni: Canonica, La Giola, Montalbano, San Martino dei Mulini, San Michele, Sant'Ermete, San Vito

Government
  - Mayor: Alice Parma

Area
  - Total: 45 km^{2} (17 sq mi)
- Elevation: 42 m (138 ft)

Population (2009)
  - Total: 21,320
  - Density: 470/km^{2} (1,200/sq mi)
- Demonym: Santarcangiolesi
- Time zone: UTC+1 (CET)
  - Summer (DST): UTC+2 (CEST)
- Postal code: 47822
- Dialing code: 0541
- Patron saint: St. Michael Archangel
- Saint day: September 29
- Website: Official website

Santarcangelo di Romagna (Romagnol: Santarcànzul) is a comune in the province of Rimini, in the Italian region of Emilia-Romagna, on the Via Emilia. As of 2009, it had a population of some 21,300. It is crossed by two rivers, the Uso and the Marecchia.

The municipality includes much of the town of San Vito, notable for the Ponte di San Vito and the Sanctuary of Madonna di Casale.

== History ==
Santarcangelo lies on the route of the Via Aemilia, the ancient Roman road running between Ariminum (modern Rimini) and Placentia (Piacenza). A stone bridge crossed the river Uso near Santarcangelo. Under the reign of emperor Augustus, the Via Aemilia was rerouted to run through San Vito, crossing the Uso at the Ponte di San Vito.

On 16 April 1992, the municipality transferred from the province of Forlì to the newly created province of Rimini.

== Main monuments ==
- Arco Ganganelli (1772–77): Neoclassical triumphal arch built to honor the recently elected Pope Clement XIV (al secolo Lorenzo Ganganelli), native to Santarcangelo. Designed by the architect Cosimo Morelli. In front of the Arch there is the Town Hall of the mid-1800s, built on designs by Giovanni Benedettini.
- Belltower
- Monumental Public Grotto
- Historic and Archaeological Museum
- Collegiate Church, built between 1744 and 1758 by the architect Giovan Francesco
- Malatesta Fortress (private property of the Colonna family), built in 1386 and of a structure with three polygonal bastions completed by Sigismondo Pandolfo Malatesta in 1447

== Festivals ==
Santarcangelo dei Teatri is an international festival dedicated to the contemporary scene. The spectacles are held in the streets and squares of the city. It produces and promotes theatre and dance, with a special attention to interdisciplinary experiences and international cooperation dynamics.

Started in 1971 with a strong political impulse, Santarcangelo Festival was called "International Square Theatre Festival". Under the art direction of Piero Patino, it wanted to weave political requests linked to the movements of 1968 and the folklore inborn in the cultural tradition of Romagna.

== Transport ==
The city lies on the Bologna–Ancona railway and offers hourly connections to Rimini.

Between 1916 and 1960, the village of Sant'Ermete, on the opposite site of the Marecchia, was served by the Rimini–Novafeltria railway. Following its closure, much of the railway was incorporated into the SP258 provincial road. To allow the road's widening, the tracks in the province of Forlì were removed in 1964, costing 17.5 million lire.

Santarcangelo was to be the terminus of the never-completed Santarcangelo–Urbino railway, also known as the subappenine railway, which would have run to Urbino through San Leo. The project was intended to provide an inland alternative to the Bologna–Ancona railway, whose coastal position made it vulnerable to bombardment. It was abandoned in 1933, but some tracks had already been laid in the section from Santarcangelo to San Leo.

== Notable people ==
- Raffaello Baldini (1924–2005), journalist and poet in the Romagnol language, was born and raised in Santarcangelo
