= Savignano sul Rubicone =

- Comune
- Comune di Savignano sul Rubicone
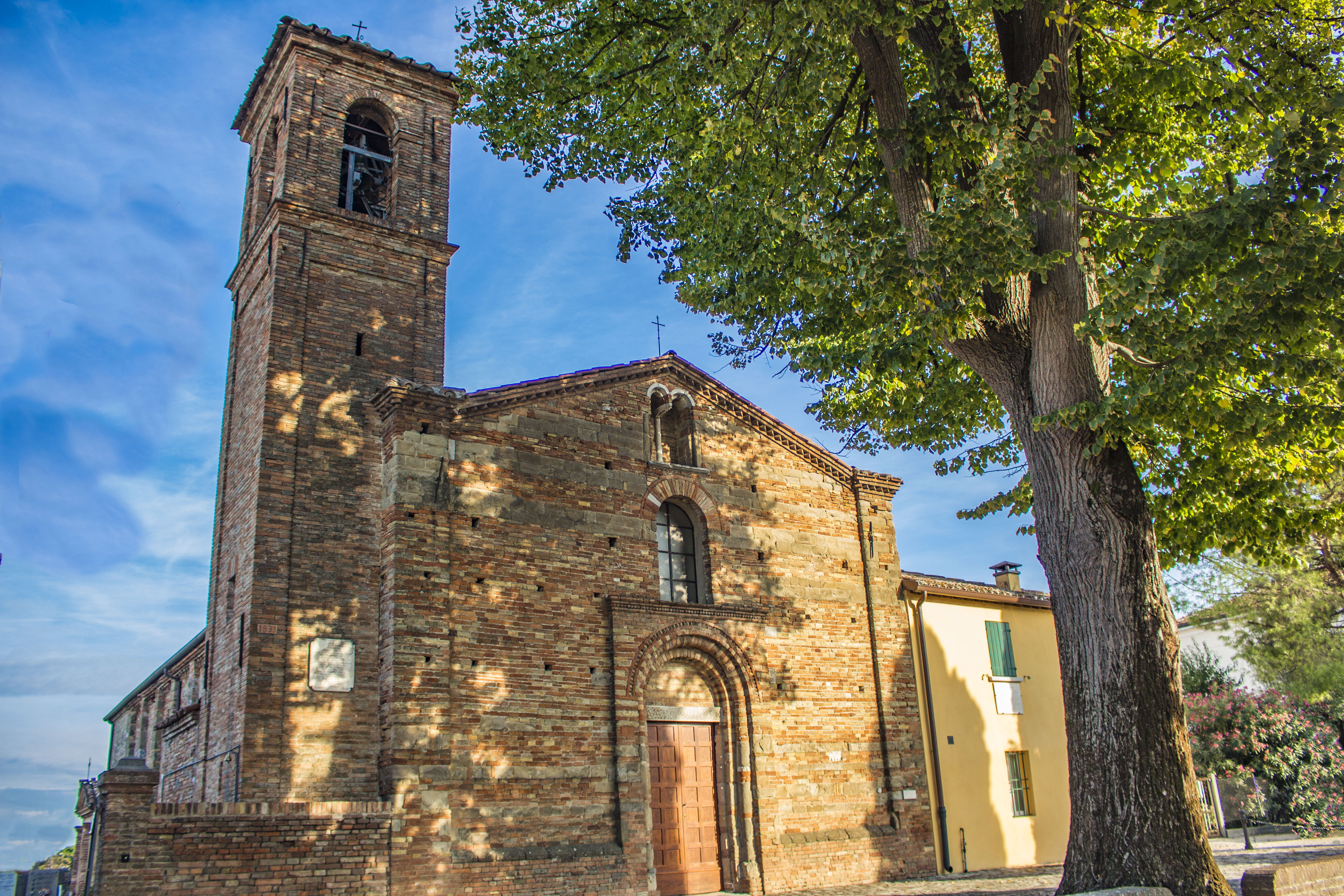
- Pieve di San Giovanni in Compito

- Flag Coat of arms

- Location within Italy Location within Emilia-Romagna
- Coordinates: 44°6′N 12°24′E
- Country: Italy
- Region: Emilia-Romagna
- Province: Forlì-Cesena (FC)
- Frazioni: Capanni, Fiumicino, Savignano a Mare

Government
  - Mayor: Elena Battistini

Area
  - Total: 23.2 km^{2} (9.0 sq mi)
- Elevation: 32 m (105 ft)

Population (28 February 2021)
  - Total: 17,858
  - Density: 770/km^{2} (1,990/sq mi)
- Demonym: Savignanesi
- Time zone: UTC+1 (CET)
  - Summer (DST): UTC+2 (CEST)
- Postal code: 47039
- Dialing code: 0541
- Website: Official website

Savignano sul Rubicone (Romagnol: Savgnèn) is a comune (municipality) in the Province of Forlì-Cesena in the Italian region Emilia-Romagna, located about 90 kilometres (56 mi) southeast of Bologna and about 30 kilometres (19 mi) southeast of Forlì.

The comune takes its name from the Rubicon, famous for Julius Caesar's historic crossing. A combination of natural and man-made changes caused the original Rubicon to change course repeatedly. For centuries the exact location of the original river was unknown. In 1991, the Fiumicino, a river which crosses Savignano sul Rubicone, was identified as the most likely location for the original Rubicon. Prior to that the town was called Savignano di Romagna.

== Twin towns ==
- Nizza Monferrato, Italy
- Vals-les-Bains, France
