= 2019 Tour du Rwanda =

2019 UCI Africa Tour

Race details
- Dates: 24 February–3 March 2019
- Stages: 8
- Distance: 958.4 km (595.5 mi)
- Winning time: 24h 12' 37"

Results
Jersey awarded to the overall winner	Winner	Merhawi Kudus (ERI)	(Astana)
	Second	Rein Taaramäe (EST)	(Direct Énergie)
	Third	Matteo Badilatti (SUI)	(Israel Cycling Academy)
Jersey awarded to the mountains classification winner	Mountains	Yakob Debesay (ERI)	(Eritrea)
Jersey awarded to the youth classification winner	Youth	Yakob Debesay (ERI)	(Eritrea)
Jersey awarded to the sprints classification winner	Sprints	Rohan du Plooy (RSA)	(ProTouch)
	Team	Eritrea	

The 2019 Tour du Rwanda was a road cycling stage race that took place between 24 February and 3 March 2019. The race was rated as a 2.1 event as part of the 2019 UCI Africa Tour, and was the 22nd edition of the Tour du Rwanda.

== Teams ==
Seventeen teams started the race. Each team had a maximum of five riders:

UCI WorldTeams

- Astana

UCI Professional Continental Teams

- Delko–Marseille Provence
- Israel Cycling Academy
- Team Novo Nordisk
- Direct Énergie

UCI Continental Teams

- BAI–Sicasal–Petro de Luanda
- Benediction–Excel Energy
- Dimension Data for Qhubeka
- Interpro Cycling Academy
- NiCe–Ethiopia Cycling Team
- ProTouch

National Teams

- Algeria
- Cameroon
- Eritrea
- France U23
- Kenya
- Rwanda

== Route ==
Stage characteristics and winners
Stage	Date	Course	Distance	Type	Stage winner
1	24 February	Kigali to Kigali	111.8 km (69.5 mi)	Hilly stage	Alessandro Fedeli (ITA)
2	25 February	Kigali to Huye	120.3 km (74.8 mi)	Medium mountain stage	Merhawi Kudus (ERI)
3	26 February	Huye to Rubavu	213.1 km (132.4 mi)	Mountain stage	Merhawi Kudus (ERI)
4	27 February	Rubavu to Karongi	103 km (64 mi)	Mountain stage	Edwin Ávila (COL)
5	28 February	Karongi to Musanze	138.7 km (86.2 mi)	Mountain stage	Biniam Girmay (ERI)
6	1 March	Musanze to Nyamata	120.5 km (74.9 mi)	Medium mountain stage	Przemysław Kasperkiewicz (POL)
7	2 March	Nyamata to Kigali	84.2 km (52.3 mi)	Hilly stage	Yakob Debesay (ERI)
8	3 March	Kigali to Kigali	66.8 km (41.5 mi)	Hilly stage	Rodrigo Contreras (COL)
Total		958.4 km (595.5 mi)			

== Stages ==
=== Stage 1 ===
Stage 1 result

Rank	Rider	Team	Time
1	Alessandro Fedeli (ITA)	Delko–Marseille Provence	2h 41' 32"
2	Yakob Debesay (ERI)	Eritrea	s.t.
3	Przemysław Kasperkiewicz (POL)	Delko–Marseille Provence	s.t.
4	Joseph Areruya (RWA)	Delko–Marseille Provence	s.t.
5	Salim Kipkemboi (KEN)	Kenya	s.t.
6	Simon Guglielmi (FRA)	France U23	s.t.
7	Sirak Tesfom (ERI)	Eritrea	s.t.
8	Bryan Nauleau (FRA)	Direct Énergie	s.t.
9	Patrick Byukusenge (RWA)	Benediction Cycling Team	s.t.
10	Nikita Stalnov (KAZ)	Astana	s.t.

General classification after Stage 1

Rank	Rider	Team	Time
1	Alessandro Fedeli (ITA)	Delko–Marseille Provence	2h 41' 32"
2	Yakob Debesay (ERI)	Eritrea	s.t.
3	Przemysław Kasperkiewicz (POL)	Delko–Marseille Provence	s.t.
4	Joseph Areruya (RWA)	Delko–Marseille Provence	s.t.
5	Salim Kipkemboi (KEN)	Kenya	s.t.
6	Simon Guglielmi (FRA)	France U23	s.t.
7	Sirak Tesfom (ERI)	Eritrea	s.t.
8	Bryan Nauleau (FRA)	Direct Énergie	s.t.
9	Patrick Byukusenge (RWA)	Benediction Cycling Team	s.t.
10	Nikita Stalnov (KAZ)	Astana	s.t.

=== Stage 2 ===
Stage 2 result

Rank	Rider	Team	Time
1	Merhawi Kudus (ERI)	Astana	3h 02' 17"
2	Przemysław Kasperkiewicz (POL)	Delko–Marseille Provence	+ 2"
3	Biniam Girmay (ERI)	Eritrea	s.t.
4	Joseph Areruya (RWA)	Delko–Marseille Provence	s.t.
5	Rodrigo Contreras (COL)	Astana	s.t.
6	Hernán Aguirre (COL)	Interpro Cycling Academy	s.t.
7	Simon Guglielmi (FRA)	France U23	s.t.
8	Mulu Hailemichael (ETH)	Dimension Data for Qhubeka	s.t.
9	Samuel Mugisha (RWA)	Dimension Data for Qhubeka	s.t.
10	Yuriy Natarov (KAZ)	Astana	s.t.

General classification after Stage 2

Rank	Rider	Team	Time
1	Merhawi Kudus (ERI)	Astana	5h 43' 49"
2	Przemysław Kasperkiewicz (POL)	Delko–Marseille Provence	+ 2"
3	Joseph Areruya (RWA)	Delko–Marseille Provence	s.t.
4	Simon Guglielmi (FRA)	France U23	s.t.
5	Alessandro Fedeli (ITA)	Delko–Marseille Provence	s.t.
6	Sirak Tesfom (ERI)	Eritrea	s.t.
7	Yakob Debesay (ERI)	Eritrea	s.t.
8	Hernán Aguirre (COL)	Interpro Cycling Academy	s.t.
9	Bryan Nauleau (FRA)	Direct Énergie	s.t.
10	Samuel Mugisha (RWA)	Dimension Data for Qhubeka	s.t.

=== Stage 3 ===
Stage 3 result

Rank	Rider	Team	Time
1	Merhawi Kudus (ERI)	Astana	5h 21' 15"
2	Rein Taaramäe (EST)	Direct Énergie	+ 15"
3	Matteo Badilatti (SUI)	Israel Cycling Academy	+ 43"
4	Hernán Aguirre (COL)	Interpro Cycling Academy	+ 58"
5	Rodrigo Contreras (COL)	Astana	+ 8' 02"
6	Henok Mulubrhan (ERI)	Eritrea	+ 9' 27"
7	Nikita Stalnov (KAZ)	Astana	s.t.
8	Jeremy Bellicaud (FRA)	Dimension Data for Qhubeka	+ 9' 34"
9	David Lozano (ESP)	Team Novo Nordisk	+ 9' 52"
10	Joseph Areruya (RWA)	Delko–Marseille Provence	s.t.

General classification after Stage 3

Rank	Rider	Team	Time
1	Merhawi Kudus (ERI)	Astana	11h 05' 04"
2	Rein Taaramäe (EST)	Direct Énergie	+ 17"
3	Matteo Badilatti (SUI)	Israel Cycling Academy	+ 45"
4	Hernán Aguirre (COL)	Interpro Cycling Academy	+ 1' 00"
5	Rodrigo Contreras (COL)	Astana	+ 8' 04"
6	Nikita Stalnov (KAZ)	Astana	+ 9' 29"
7	Jeremy Bellicaud (FRA)	Dimension Data for Qhubeka	+ 9' 36"
8	Henok Mulubrhan (ERI)	Eritrea	+ 9' 41"
9	Joseph Areruya (RWA)	Delko–Marseille Provence	+ 9' 54"
10	Sirak Tesfom (ERI)	Eritrea	s.t.

=== Stage 4 ===
Stage 4 result

Rank	Rider	Team	Time
1	Edwin Ávila (COL)	Israel Cycling Academy	2h 37' 32"
2	Pablo Torres (ESP)	Interpro Cycling Academy	s.t.
3	Sirak Tesfom (ERI)	Eritrea	+ 3"
4	Samuel Mugisha (RWA)	Dimension Data for Qhubeka	s.t.
5	David Lozano (ESP)	Team Novo Nordisk	+ 5"
6	Adrien Guillonnet (FRA)	Interpro Cycling Academy	s.t.
7	Didier Munyaneza (RWA)	Benediction Cycling Team	s.t.
8	Alessandro Fedeli (ITA)	Delko–Marseille Provence	s.t.
9	Yakob Debesay (ERI)	Eritrea	s.t.
10	Yuriy Natarov (KAZ)	Astana	+ 9"

General classification after Stage 4

Rank	Rider	Team	Time
1	Merhawi Kudus (ERI)	Astana	13h 48' 19"
2	Rein Taaramäe (EST)	Direct Énergie	+ 17"
3	Matteo Badilatti (SUI)	Israel Cycling Academy	+ 45"
4	Hernán Aguirre (COL)	Interpro Cycling Academy	+ 1' 00"
5	Sirak Tesfom (ERI)	Eritrea	+ 4' 14"
6	Awet Gebremedhin (SWE)	Israel Cycling Academy	+ 4' 29"
7	David Lozano (ESP)	Team Novo Nordisk	+ 4' 40"
8	Suleiman Kangangi (KEN)	Kenya	+ 4' 56"
9	Yakob Debesay (ERI)	Eritrea	+ 8' 17"
10	Didier Munyaneza (RWA)	Benediction Cycling Team	s.t.

=== Stage 5 ===
Stage 5 result

Rank	Rider	Team	Time
1	Biniam Girmay (ERI)	Eritrea	3h 42' 01"
2	Joseph Areruya (RWA)	Delko–Marseille Provence	s.t.
3	Daniel Turek (CZE)	Israel Cycling Academy	s.t.
4	Didier Munyaneza (RWA)	Benediction Cycling Team	s.t.
5	Jeremy Bellicaud (FRA)	France U23	s.t.
6	Moise Mugisha (RWA)	Rwanda	s.t.
7	Adrien Guillonnet (FRA)	Interpro Cycling Academy	s.t.
8	Geoffrey Langat (KEN)	Kenya	s.t.
9	Valens Ndayisenga (RWA)	Rwanda	+ 3"
10	Eric Manizabayo (RWA)	Benediction Cycling Team	+ 47"

General classification after Stage 5

Rank	Rider	Team	Time
1	Merhawi Kudus (ERI)	Astana	17h 33' 37"
2	Rein Taaramäe (EST)	Direct Énergie	+ 17"
3	Matteo Badilatti (SUI)	Israel Cycling Academy	+ 45"
4	Hernán Aguirre (COL)	Interpro Cycling Academy	+ 1' 00"
5	Sirak Tesfom (ERI)	Eritrea	+ 4' 14"
6	David Lozano (ESP)	Team Novo Nordisk	+ 4' 40"
7	Suleiman Kangangi (KEN)	Kenya	+ 4' 56"
8	Didier Munyaneza (RWA)	Benediction Cycling Team	+ 5' 00"
9	Jeremy Bellicaud (FRA)	France U23	+ 6' 19"
10	Joseph Areruya (RWA)	Delko–Marseille Provence	+ 6' 37"

=== Stage 6 ===
Stage 6 result

Rank	Rider	Team	Time
1	Przemysław Kasperkiewicz (POL)	Delko–Marseille Provence	2h 49' 57"
2	Pablo Torres (ESP)	Interpro Cycling Academy	+ 3"
3	Youcef Reguigui (ALG)	Algeria	+ 4"
4	Henok Mulubrhan (ERI)	Eritrea	s.t.
5	Julien Trarieux (FRA)	Delko–Marseille Provence	s.t.
6	Joonas Henttala (FIN)	Team Novo Nordisk	s.t.
7	Samuel Mugisha (RWA)	Dimension Data for Qhubeka	s.t.
8	Valens Ndayisenga (RWA)	Rwanda	s.t.
9	Yakob Debesay (ERI)	Eritrea	s.t.
10	Bruno Araújo (ANG)	BAI–Sicasal–Petro de Luanda	+ 1' 19"

General classification after Stage 6

Rank	Rider	Team	Time
1	Merhawi Kudus (ERI)	Astana	20h 24' 53"
2	Rein Taaramäe (EST)	Direct Énergie	+ 17"
3	Matteo Badilatti (SUI)	Israel Cycling Academy	+ 45"
4	Hernán Aguirre (COL)	Interpro Cycling Academy	+ 1' 00"
5	Sirak Tesfom (ERI)	Eritrea	+ 4' 14"
6	David Lozano (ESP)	Team Novo Nordisk	+ 4' 40"
7	Suleiman Kangangi (KEN)	Kenya	+ 4' 56"
8	Didier Munyaneza (RWA)	Benediction Cycling Team	+ 5' 00"
9	Valens Ndayisenga (RWA)	Rwanda	+ 5' 35"
10	Jeremy Bellicaud (FRA)	France U23	+ 6' 19"

=== Stage 7 ===
Stage 7 result

Rank	Rider	Team	Time
1	Yakob Debesay (ERI)	Eritrea	2h 12' 35"
2	Alessandro Fedeli (ITA)	Delko–Marseille Provence	+ 21"
3	Adrien Guillonnet (FRA)	Interpro Cycling Academy	s.t.
4	Sirak Tesfom (ERI)	Eritrea	s.t.
5	Hernán Aguirre (COL)	Interpro Cycling Academy	+ 24"
6	Mulu Hailemichael (ETH)	Dimension Data for Qhubeka	+ 26"
7	Matteo Badilatti (SUI)	Israel Cycling Academy	s.t.
8	David Lozano (ESP)	Team Novo Nordisk	s.t.
9	Moise Mugisha (RWA)	Rwanda	+ 38"
10	Aurélien Doleatto (FRA)	France U23	+ 43"

General classification after Stage 7

Rank	Rider	Team	Time
1	Merhawi Kudus (ERI)	Astana	22h 38' 21"
2	Rein Taaramäe (EST)	Direct Énergie	+ 7"
3	Matteo Badilatti (SUI)	Israel Cycling Academy	+ 18"
4	Hernán Aguirre (COL)	Interpro Cycling Academy	+ 31"
5	Sirak Tesfom (ERI)	Eritrea	+ 3' 42"
6	David Lozano (ESP)	Team Novo Nordisk	+ 4' 13"
7	Yakob Debesay (ERI)	Eritrea	+ 5' 50"
8	Suleiman Kangangi (KEN)	Kenya	+ 6' 41"
9	Didier Munyaneza (RWA)	Benediction Cycling Team	+ 6' 47"
10	Joseph Areruya (RWA)	Delko–Marseille Provence	+ 6' 53"

=== Stage 8 ===
Stage 8 result

Rank	Rider	Team	Time
1	Rodrigo Contreras (COL)	Astana	1h 33' 10"
2	Merhawi Kudus (ERI)	Astana	+ 1' 06"
3	Alessandro Fedeli (ITA)	Delko–Marseille Provence	s.t.
4	Hernán Aguirre (COL)	Interpro Cycling Academy	s.t.
5	Mulu Hailemichael (ETH)	Dimension Data for Qhubeka	s.t.
6	Adrien Guillonnet (FRA)	Interpro Cycling Academy	s.t.
7	Matteo Badilatti (SUI)	Israel Cycling Academy	s.t.
8	Rein Taaramäe (EST)	Direct Énergie	+ 1' 09"
9	Jeremy Bellicaud (FRA)	France U23	s.t.
10	Valens Ndayisenga (RWA)	Rwanda	+ 1' 12"

== Classification leadership table ==
Stage	Winner	General classification	Sprints classification	Mountains classification	Young rider classification	Teams classification
1	Alessandro Fedeli	Alessandro Fedeli	Bonaventure Uwizeyimana	Rohan du Plooy	Alessandro Fedeli	Delko–Marseille Provence
2	Merhawi Kudus	Merhawi Kudus	Timothy Rugg	Pablo Torres	Joseph Areruya	Astana
3	Merhawi Kudus	Merhawi Kudus	Merhawi Kudus	Rohan du Plooy	Jérémy Bellicaud	Astana
4	Edwin Ávila	Merhawi Kudus	Rohan du Plooy	Pablo Torres	Yakob Debesay	Astana
5	Biniam Girmay	Merhawi Kudus	Rohan du Plooy	Moise Mugisha	Didier Munyaneza	Astana
6	Przemysław Kasperkiewicz	Merhawi Kudus	Rohan du Plooy	Moise Mugisha	Didier Munyaneza	Eritrea
7	Yakob Debesay	Merhawi Kudus	Rohan du Plooy	Moise Mugisha	Yakob Debesay	Eritrea
8	Rodrigo Contreras	Merhawi Kudus	Rohan du Plooy	Yakob Debesay	Yakob Debesay	Eritrea
Final		Merhawi Kudus	Rohan du Plooy	Yakob Debesay	Yakob Debesay	Eritrea

== Classifications ==
Final general classification

Rank	Rider	Team	Time
1	Merhawi Kudus (ERI)	Astana	24h 12' 37"
2	Rein Taaramäe (EST)	Direct Énergie	+ 10"
3	Matteo Badilatti (SUI)	Israel Cycling Academy	+ 18"
4	Hernán Aguirre (COL)	Interpro Cycling Academy	+ 31"
5	Sirak Tesfom (ERI)	Eritrea	+ 4' 04"
6	David Lozano (ESP)	Team Novo Nordisk	+ 4' 50"
7	Yakob Debesay (ERI)	Eritrea	+ 6' 51"
8	Suleiman Kangangi (KEN)	Kenya	+ 7' 05"
9	Joseph Areruya (RWA)	Delko–Marseille Provence	+ 7' 10"
10	Rodrigo Contreras (COL)	Astana	+ 7' 11"

Final sprints classification

Rank	Rider	Team	Points
1	Rohan du Plooy (RSA)	ProTouch Sports	26
2	Timothy Rugg (USA)	BAI–Sicasal–Petro de Luanda	16
3	Yakob Debesay (ERI)	Eritrea	10
4	Moise Mugisha (RWA)	Rwanda	8
5	Bonaventure Uwizeyimana (RWA)	Benediction Cycling Team	6
6	Adrien Guillonnet (FRA)	Interpro Cycling Academy	5
7	Joseph Areruya (RWA)	Delko–Marseille Provence	4
8	Julien Trarieux (FRA)	Delko–Marseille Provence	4
9	Perrig Quéméneur (FRA)	Direct Énergie	4
10	Przemysław Kasperkiewicz (POL)	Delko–Marseille Provence	3

Final mountains classification

Rank	Rider	Team	Points
1	Yakob Debesay (ERI)	Eritrea	80
2	Moise Mugisha (RWA)	Rwanda	72
3	Adrien Guillonnet (FRA)	Interpro Cycling Academy	51
4	Pablo Torres (ESP)	Interpro Cycling Academy	42
5	Rodrigo Contreras (COL)	Astana	41
6	Mulu Hailemichael (ETH)	Dimension Data for Qhubeka	38
7	Merhawi Kudus (ERI)	Astana	26
8	Samuel Mugisha (RWA)	Dimension Data for Qhubeka	23
9	Matteo Badilatti (SUI)	Israel Cycling Academy	16
10	Rein Taaramäe (EST)	Direct Énergie	14

Final youth classification

Rank	Rider	Team	Time
1	Yakob Debesay (ERI)	Eritrea	24h 19' 28"
2	Joseph Areruya (RWA)	Delko–Marseille Provence	+ 19"
3	Jeremy Bellicaud (FRA)	France U23	+ 1' 16"
4	Henok Mulubrhan (ERI)	Eritrea	+ 2' 41"
5	Mulu Hailemichael (ETH)	Dimension Data for Qhubeka	+ 6' 37"
6	Alessandro Fedeli (ITA)	Delko–Marseille Provence	+ 7' 44"
7	Samuel Mugisha (RWA)	Dimension Data for Qhubeka	+ 8' 28"
8	Eric Manizabayo (RWA)	Benediction Cycling Team	+ 11' 35"
9	Didier Munyaneza (RWA)	Benediction Cycling Team	+ 12' 10"
10	John Kariuki (KEN)	Kenya	+ 17' 31"

Final teams classification

Rank	Team	Time
1	Eritrea	72h 49' 16"
2	Interpro Cycling Academy	+ 2' 53"
3	Astana	+ 6' 33"
4	Israel Cycling Academy	+ 10' 23"
5	Delko–Marseille Provence	+ 43' 02"
6	Benediction Cycling Team	+ 46' 23"
7	Kenya	+ 51' 16"
8	France U23	+ 1h 02' 06"
9	Direct Énergie	+ 1h 09' 21"
10	Dimension Data for Qhubeka	+ 1h 20' 08"
