= List of wins by VC La Pomme and its successors =

This is a comprehensive list of victories of the Delko cycling team. The races are categorized according to the UCI Continental Circuits rules. The team was in the National category from 1974 to 2010, then the UCI Continental category from 2011 to 2015 then up to UCI Professional Continental from 2016 till present.

== Pre 2008 ==
No recorded wins
- 1974 – VC La Pomme
- 1975 – VC La Pomme
- 1976 – VC La Pomme
- 1977 – VC La Pomme
- 1978 – VC La Pomme
- 1979 – VC La Pomme
- 1980 – VC La Pomme
- 1981 – VC La Pomme
- 1982 – VC La Pomme
- 1983 – VC La Pomme
- 1984 – VC La Pomme
- 1985 – VC La Pomme
- 1986 – VC La Pomme
- 1987 – VC La Pomme
- 1988 – VC La Pomme
- 1989 – VC La Pomme
- 1990 – VC La Pomme
- 1991 – VC La Pomme
- 1992 – VC La Pomme
- 1993 – VC La Pomme
- 1994 – VC La Pomme
- 1995 – VC La Pomme
- 1996 – VC La Pomme
- 1997 – VC La Pomme
- 1998 – VC La Pomme
- 1999 – VC La Pomme
- 2000 – VC La Pomme Marseille
- 2001 – VC La Pomme Marseille
- 2002 – VC La Pomme Marseille
- 2003 – VC La Pomme Marseille
- 2004 – VC La Pomme Marseille
- 2005 – VC La Pomme Marseille
- 2006 – VC La Pomme Marseille
- 2007 – VC La Pomme Marseille

== 2008 – VC La Pomme Marseille ==
Stage 2 Les 3 Jours de Vaucluse, Julien Antomarchi
Stage 4 Tour de Bretagne Cycliste, Julien Antomarchi

== 2009 – VC La Pomme Marseille ==
Stage 2 Giro della Valle d'Aosta, Yannick Marie

== 2011 – VC La Pomme Marseille ==
Stage 2 Tour du Haut Var, Julien Antomarchi
Stage 3 Circuit des Ardennes, Benjamin Giraud
Stage 1 (TTT) La Coupe du Président de la Ville de Grudziądz
Stage 1 (TTT) Tour de Berlin
Overall Volta ao Alentejo, Evaldas Šiškevičius

Stage 3, Evaldas Šiškevičius

Stage 1 Tour of Hainan, Justin Jules

== 2012 – La Pomme Marseille ==
Paris–Camembert, Pierre-Luc Périchon
Stage 3 Le Tour de Bretagne Cycliste, Evaldas Šiškevičius
Stage 5 Le Tour de Bretagne Cycliste, Thomas Vaubourzeix
Stage 2 Tour du Limousin, Evaldas Šiškevičius
Grand Prix de la Somme, Evaldas Šiškevičius

== 2013 – La Pomme Marseille ==
Grand Prix Cycliste la Marseillaise, Justin Jules
Stage 6 Tour de Taiwan, Benjamin Giraud
Stage 1 Mzansi Tour, Julien Antomarchi
Stage 5 Four Days of Dunkirk, Yannick Martinez
Stage 1 Route du Sud, Yannick Martinez
Stage 10 Tour of Qinghai Lake, Benjamin Giraud
Polynormande, José Gonçalves
France National Under-23 Time Trial Championships, Yoann Paillot
Stages 2 & 5 Tour of China I, Benjamin Giraud

== 2014 – La Pomme Marseille ==
Overall Tour de Taiwan, Rémy Di Gregorio

Stage 2, Benjamin Giraud

Stage 5 Tour d'Azerbaïdjan, Justin Jules
Stage 5 Tour of Qinghai Lake, Thomas Vaubourzeix
Stage 1 Tour Alsace, Grégoire Tarride
Overall Tour of Hainan, Julien Antomarchi

Stages 4 & 7, Julien Antomarchi

== 2015 Marseille 13–KTM ==
Paris–Camembert, Julien Loubet
Overall Circuit des Ardennes, Evaldas Šiškevičius

Stage 3, Team time trial

Overall Four Days of Dunkirk, Ignatas Konovalovas
Stage 5 Tour of Hainan, Benjamin Giraud
Overall Tour of Yancheng Coastal Wetlands, Evaldas Šiškevičius

Stage 1, Evaldas Šiškevičius

== 2016 – Delko–Marseille Provence KTM ==
Stage 4 Tour des Fjords, Asbjørn Kragh Andersen
Overall Tour of Taihu Lake, Leonardo Duque

Stage 7, Leonardo Duque

== 2017 – Delko–Marseille Provence KTM ==
Classic Sud-Ardèche, Mauro Finetto
Stage 1 La Tropicale Amissa Bongo, Mikel Aristi

== 2018 – Delko–Marseille Provence KTM ==
Stages 2 & 5 La Tropicale Amissa Bongo, Brenton Jones
Overall Sharjah Tour, Javier Moreno
Stage 2 Tour La Provence, Rémy Di Gregorio
Stage 2 Tour de l'Ain, Javier Moreno
Rwanda National Time Trial Championship, Joseph Areruya
Bulgaria National Road Race Championship, Nikolay Mihaylov
Stage 2 Tour of Qinghai Lake, Brenton Jones

== 2019 – Delko–Marseille Provence ==
Australia National Criterium Championships, Brenton Jones
Stage 1 Tour of Rwanda, Alessandro Fedeli
Stage 6 Tour of Rwanda, Przemysław Kasperkiewicz
Ronde van Limburg, Eduard-Michael Grosu
Rwanda National Time Trial Championship, Joseph Areruya
Lithuania National Road Race Championship, Ramūnas Navardauskas
Stage 2 Tour of Qinghai Lake, Brenton Jones
Stage 3 & 6 Tour of Qinghai Lake, Eduard-Michael Grosu
Stage 2 Okolo Slovenska, Eduard-Michael Grosu
Stage 2 CRO Race, Eduard-Michael Grosu
Stage 5 Tour of Taihu Lake, Brenton Jones

== 2020 – Nippo–Delko–One Provence ==
Stages 3 & 6 La Tropicale Amissa Bongo, Biniam Girmay
Stage 6 Tour de Langkawi, Hideto Nakane
Stage 2 Tour of Rwanda, Mulu Hailemichael
Stage 8 Tour of Rwanda, José Manuel Díaz
Stage 3 Tour of Bulgaria, Pierre Barbier
Lithuania National Time trial Championship, Evaldas Šiškevičius
Stage 4 Tour du Limousin, Alessandro Fedeli
Young rider classification Volta a Portugal, Simon Carr
Prueba Villafranca de Ordizia, Simon Carr

== 2021 – Delko ==
Overall Presidential Tour of Turkey, José Manuel Díaz

Stage 5, José Manuel Díaz

Lithuania National Time trial Championship, Evaldas Šiškevičius
Serbia National Road Race Championships, Dušan Rajović
Stage 5 Tour Poitou-Charentes en Nouvelle-Aquitaine, Clément Carisey

== Supplementary statistics ==
Grand Tours by highest finishing position
Race	2016	2017	2018	2019	2020	2021
Giro d'Italia	–	–	–	–	–	–
Tour de France	–	–	–	–	–	–
Vuelta a España	–	–	–	–	–	–
Major week-long stage races by highest finishing position
Race	2016	2017	2018	2019	2020	2021
Tour Down Under	–	–	–	–	–	NH
Paris–Nice	29	20	37	24	37	–
Tirreno–Adriatico	–	–	–	–	–	–
Volta a Catalunya	–	–	–	–	NH	–
Tour of the Basque Country	–	–	–	–	NH	–
Tour de Romandie	–	–	–	–	NH	–
Critérium du Dauphiné	–	42	–	–	–	–
Tour de Suisse	–	–	–	–	NH	–
Tour de Pologne	–	–	–	–	–	–
Eneco Tour	–	–	–	–	–	–
Monument races by highest finishing position
Monument	2016	2017	2018	2019	2020	2021
Milan–San Remo	–	–	–	–	–	–
Tour of Flanders	–	–	–	–	–	–
Paris–Roubaix	80	DNF	75	9	NH	33
Liège–Bastogne–Liège	–	–	–	–	11	–
Il Lombardia	–	–	–	–	–	–
Classics by highest finishing position
Classic	2016	2017	2018	2019	2020	2021
Omloop Het Nieuwsblad	–	–	–	–	–	–
Kuurne–Brussels–Kuurne	–	–	–	–	–	–
Strade Bianche	–	–	–	–	–	–
E3 Harelbeke	–	–	–	–	NH	–
Gent–Wevelgem	–	–	–	–	–	–
Amstel Gold Race	–	–	–	–	NH	–
La Flèche Wallonne	43	–	56	–	–	26
Clásica de San Sebastián	–	–	–	–	NH	–
Paris–Tours	22	43	40	24	11	9
