= 2021 Intermarché–Wanty–Gobert Matériaux season =

Intermarché–Wanty–Gobert Matériaux
- 2021 season
- UCI code: IWG
- Status: UCI WorldTeam
- World Tour Rank: 14th
- Manager: Jean-François Bourlart (BEL)
- Main sponsor(s): Groupe Gobert; Intermarché; Wanty
- Based: Belgium
- Bicycles: Cube
- Groupset: Shimano

Season victories
- One-day races: 4
- Stage race stages: 4
- National Championships: 1
- Most wins: Taco van der Hoorn (NED) (4)
- Best ranked rider: Danny van Poppel (NED) (30th)
- Jersey

The 2021 season for Intermarché–Wanty–Gobert Matériaux was the 14th season in the team's existence. After starting out as a UCI Continental team and spending most of its existence as a UCI Professional Continental team/UCI ProTeam, the team was promoted to a UCI WorldTeam, taking over the WorldTeam license of the disbanded CCC Team. In addition, French supermarket brand Intermarché joined Belgian engineering companies Wanty and Groupe Gobert as co-title sponsors.

== Team roster ==
As of 9 August 2021.

Rider	Date of birth
Jan Bakelants (BEL)	14 February 1986 (aged 34)
Jérémy Bellicaud (FRA)	8 June 1998 (aged 22)
Stijn Daemen (Note: Daemen, De Pooter, and Jarnet joined as stagiaires on 1 August from Abloc CT, SEG Racing Academy, and EC Saint-Étienne Loire, respectively.) (NED)	25 July 1999 (aged 21)
Aimé De Gendt (BEL)	17 June 1994 (aged 26)
Jasper De Plus (BEL)	11 June 1997 (aged 23)
Dries De Pooter (BEL)	8 November 2002 (aged 18)
Ludwig De Winter (BEL)	31 December 1992 (aged 28)
Théo Delacroix (FRA)	21 February 1999 (aged 21)
Tom Devriendt (BEL)	29 October 1991 (aged 29)
Odd Christian Eiking (NOR)	28 December 1994 (aged 26)
Alex Evans (AUS)	28 January 1997 (aged 23)
Biniam Girmay (Note: Girmay joined the team on 6 August, after having previously raced for Delko earlier in the year.) (ERI)	2 April 2000 (aged 20)
Quinten Hermans (BEL)	29 July 1995 (aged 25)
Maxime Jarnet (FRA)	6 September 1998 (aged 22)
Jan Hirt (CZE)	21 January 1991 (aged 29)
Jonas Koch (GER)	25 June 1993 (aged 27)
Wesley Kreder (NED)	4 November 1990 (aged 30)

Rider	Date of birth
Maurits Lammertink (NED)	31 August 1990 (aged 30)
Louis Meintjes (RSA)	21 February 1992 (aged 28)
Riccardo Minali (ITA)	19 April 1995 (aged 25)
Andrea Pasqualon (ITA)	2 January 1988 (aged 32)
Simone Petilli (ITA)	4 May 1993 (aged 27)
Baptiste Planckaert (BEL)	28 September 1988 (aged 32)
Lorenzo Rota (ITA)	23 May 1995 (aged 25)
Rein Taaramäe (EST)	24 April 1987 (aged 33)
Taco van der Hoorn (NED)	4 December 1993 (aged 27)
Corné van Kessel (NED)	7 August 1991 (aged 29)
Kevin Van Melsen (BEL)	1 April 1987 (aged 33)
Boy van Poppel (NED)	18 January 1988 (aged 32)
Danny van Poppel (NED)	26 July 1993 (aged 27)
Pieter Vanspeybrouck (BEL)	10 February 1987 (aged 33)
Loïc Vliegen (BEL)	20 December 1993 (aged 27)
Georg Zimmermann (GER)	11 October 1997 (aged 23)

Riders who joined the team for or during the 2021 season

Rider	2020 team
Biniam Girmay	Delko
Jan Hirt	CCC Team
Jonas Koch	CCC Team
Louis Meintjes	NTT Pro Cycling
Riccardo Minali	Nippo–Delko–One Provence
Baptiste Planckaert	Bingoal–Wallonie Bruxelles
Lorenzo Rota	Vini Zabù–Brado–KTM
Rein Taaramäe	Total Direct Énergie
Taco van der Hoorn	Team Jumbo–Visma
Georg Zimmermann	CCC Team

Riders who left the team during or after the 2020 season

Rider	2021 team
Alfdan De Decker	Tarteletto–Isorex
Thomas Degand	
Fabien Doubey	Total Direct Énergie
Timothy Dupont	Bingoal WB
Xandro Meurisse	Alpecin–Fenix
Yoann Offredo	Retired

== Season victories ==
Date	Race	Competition	Rider	Country	Location	Ref.
10 May	Giro d'Italia, Stage 3	UCI World Tour	Taco van der Hoorn (NED)	Italy	Canale	
30 July	Tour de l'Ain, Stage 2	UCI Europe Tour	Georg Zimmermann (GER)	France	Saint-Vulbas	
15 August	Tour de Pologne, Active rider classification	UCI World Tour	Taco van der Hoorn (NED)	Poland		
16 August	Vuelta a España, Stage 3	UCI World Tour	Rein Taaramäe (EST)	Spain	Espinosa de los Monteros – Picón Blanco	
17 August	Egmont Cycling Race	UCI Europe Tour	Danny van Poppel (NED)	Belgium	Zottegem	
29 August	Deutschland Tour, Young rider classification	UCI Europe Tour; UCI ProSeries	Georg Zimmermann (GER)	Germany		
1 September	Benelux Tour, Stage 3	UCI World Tour	Taco van der Hoorn (NED)	Netherlands	Hoogerheide	
3 September	Classic Grand Besançon Doubs	UCI Europe Tour	Biniam Girmay (ERI)	France	Marchaux	
5 September	Benelux Tour, Points classification	UCI World Tour	Danny van Poppel (NED)	Belgium		
23 September	Omloop van het Houtland	UCI Europe Tour	Taco van der Hoorn (NED)	Belgium	Lichtervelde	
5 October	Binche–Chimay–Binche	UCI Europe Tour	Danny van Poppel (NED)	Belgium	Binche	

== National, Continental, and World Champions ==
Date	Discipline	Jersey	Rider	Country	Location	Ref.
18 June	Estonian National Time Trial Championships		Rein Taaramäe (EST)	Estonia	Lüllemäe	
