= Hernán Aguirre =

Colombian cyclist

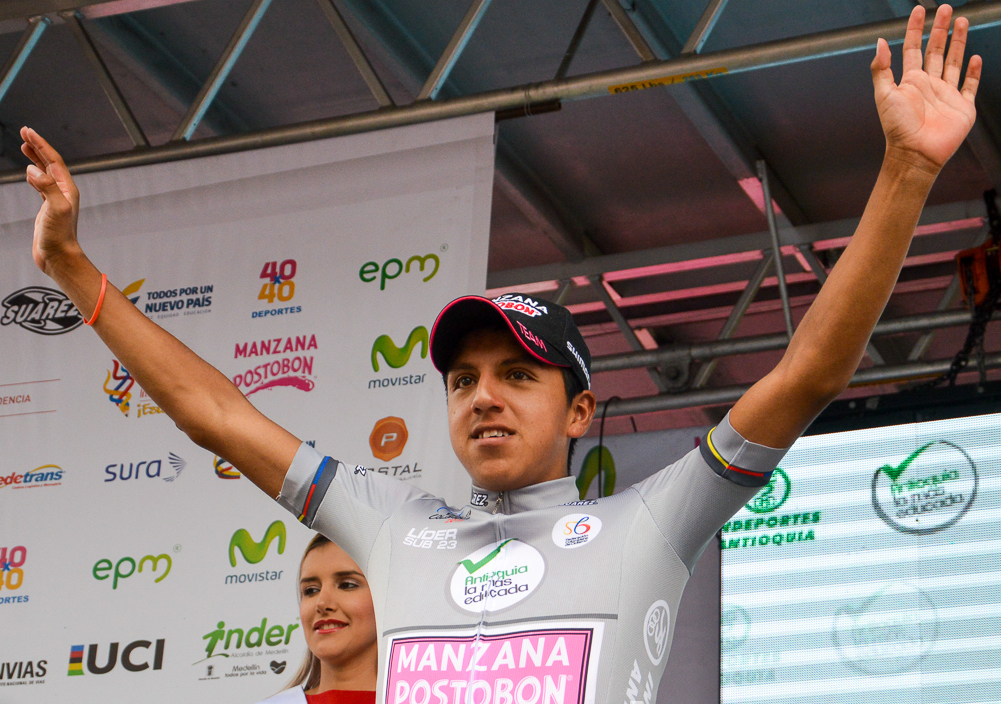
- Aguirre in 2015.

Personal information
- Full name: Hernán Ricardo Aguirre Calpa
- Born: 13 December 1995 (age 30) Guachucal, Colombia
- Height: 1.71 m (5 ft 7 in)
- Weight: 55 kg (121 lb)

Cycling career
- Sport: Cycling
- Current team: Petrolike
- Discipline: Road
- Role: Rider
- Rider type: Climber

Amateur teams
- 2013: Gobernación de Nariño
- 2015: Team Manzana Postobón
- 2022: Sistecredito–GW

Professional teams
- 2014: 4-72 Colombia
- 2016–2018: Team Manzana Postobón
- 2019: Interpro Cycling Academy
- 2020: Colombia Tierra de Atletas–GW Bicicletas
- 2023–: Team Petrolike

Hernán Ricardo Aguirre Calpa (born 13 December 1995 in Guachucal) is a Colombian cyclist, who currently rides for UCI Continental team Petrolike. He was named in the startlist for the 2017 Vuelta a España.

== Major results ==
2013
1st Overall Vuelta a Colombia Juniors

1st Stage 2

2015
9th Overall Vuelta a Colombia

1st Young rider classification

2016
3rd Overall Vuelta de la Juventud de Colombia

1st Stage 7

6th Overall Giro della Valle d'Aosta
10th Overall Tour Alsace
2017
8th Overall Vuelta a la Comunidad de Madrid
9th Overall Vuelta a Asturias

1st Young rider classification

2018
1st Overall Tour of Qinghai Lake

1st Mountains classification
1st Stages 4 & 6

9th Overall Vuelta a Aragón

1st Young rider classification

2019
Tour of Qinghai Lake

1st Mountains classification
1st Stage 4

4th Overall Tour of Rwanda
4th Overall Tour de Langkawi
2020
8th Overall Tour Colombia

=== Grand Tour general classification results timeline ===
Grand Tour	2017
Giro d'Italia	—
Tour de France	—
Vuelta a España	37

Legend
—	Did not compete
DNF	Did not finish
