= Chaudefontaine =

Chaudefontaine may refer to the following places in France:

- Chaudefontaine, Doubs, a commune in the Doubs department
- Chaudefontaine, Marne, a commune in the Marne department
