= Debesay =

Debesay (ደበሳይ) is an Eritrean surname. Notable people with the surname include:

- Ferekalsi Debesay (born 1986), Eritrean cyclist
- Mekseb Debesay (born 1991), Eritrean cyclist, brother of Ferekalsi
- Mossana Debesai (born 1993), Eritrean cyclist
- Yakob Debesay (born 1999), Eritrean cyclist
