= Suleiman Kangangi =

Kenyan bicycle racer (1988–2022)

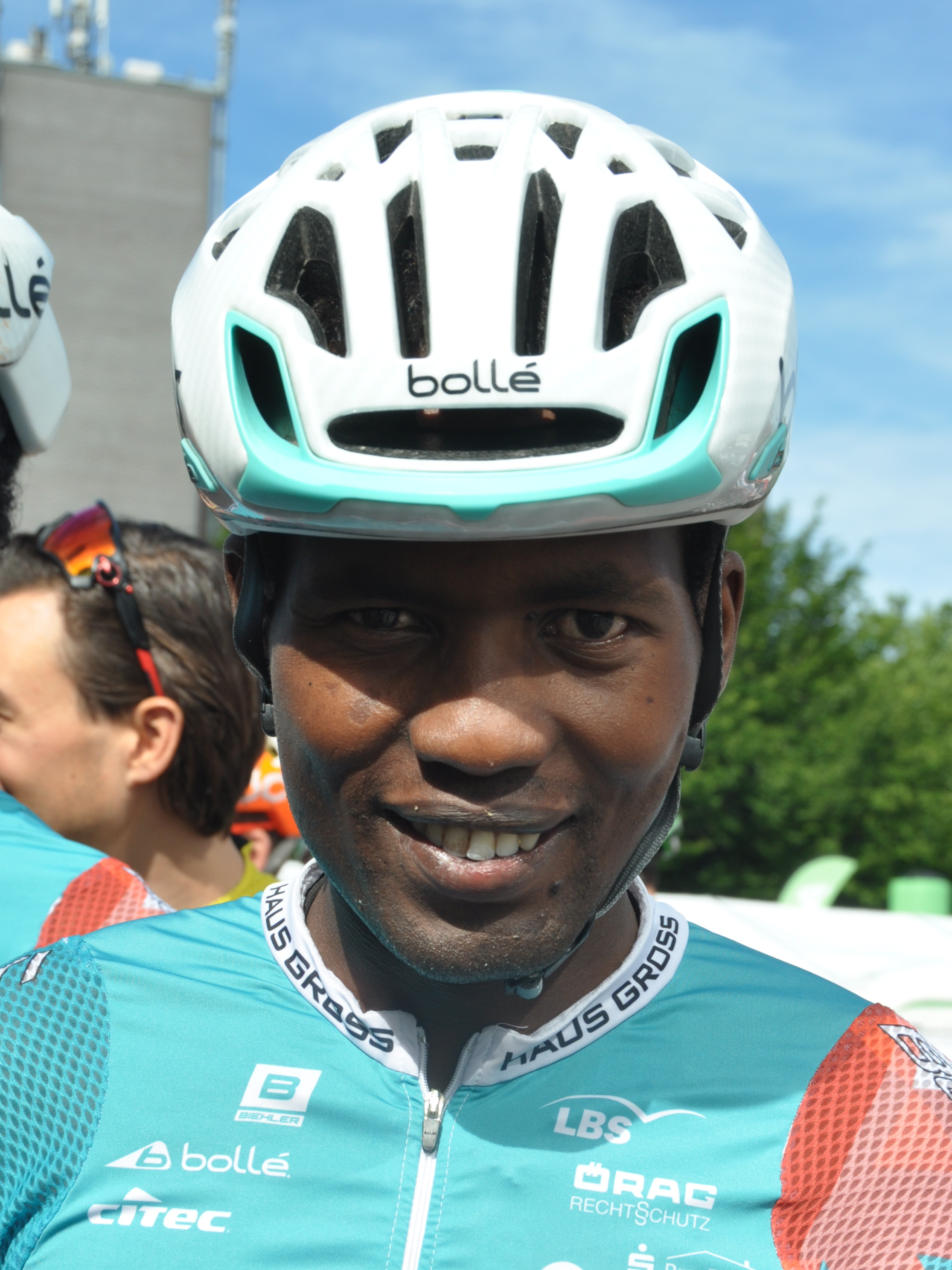
- Kangangi in 2017

Personal information
- Full name: Suleiman Waithuweka Kangangi
- Born: 9 December 1988 Eldoret, Kenya
- Died: 27 August 2022 (aged 33) Vermont, U.S.

Cycling career
- Sport: Cycling
- Discipline: Road
- Role: Rider

Professional teams
- 2016: Kenyan Riders Downunder
- 2017–2020: Bike Aid

Suleiman Waithuweka Kangangi (9 December 1988 – 27 August 2022) was a Kenyan cyclist who rode for UCI Continental team Bike Aid. He was killed in a high speed crash while riding in a gravel race in Vermont, USA.

== Major results ==
2016
8th Overall Tour Ethiopian Meles Zenawi
9th Overall Tour de Ijen
10th Overall Tour of Rwanda
2017
3rd Overall Tour of Rwanda
8th Overall Tour du Cameroun
9th Overall Tour Ethiopian Meles Zenawi
2019
8th Overall Tour du Rwanda
