= Negasi Haylu Abreha =

Ethiopian cyclist

Negasi Abreha
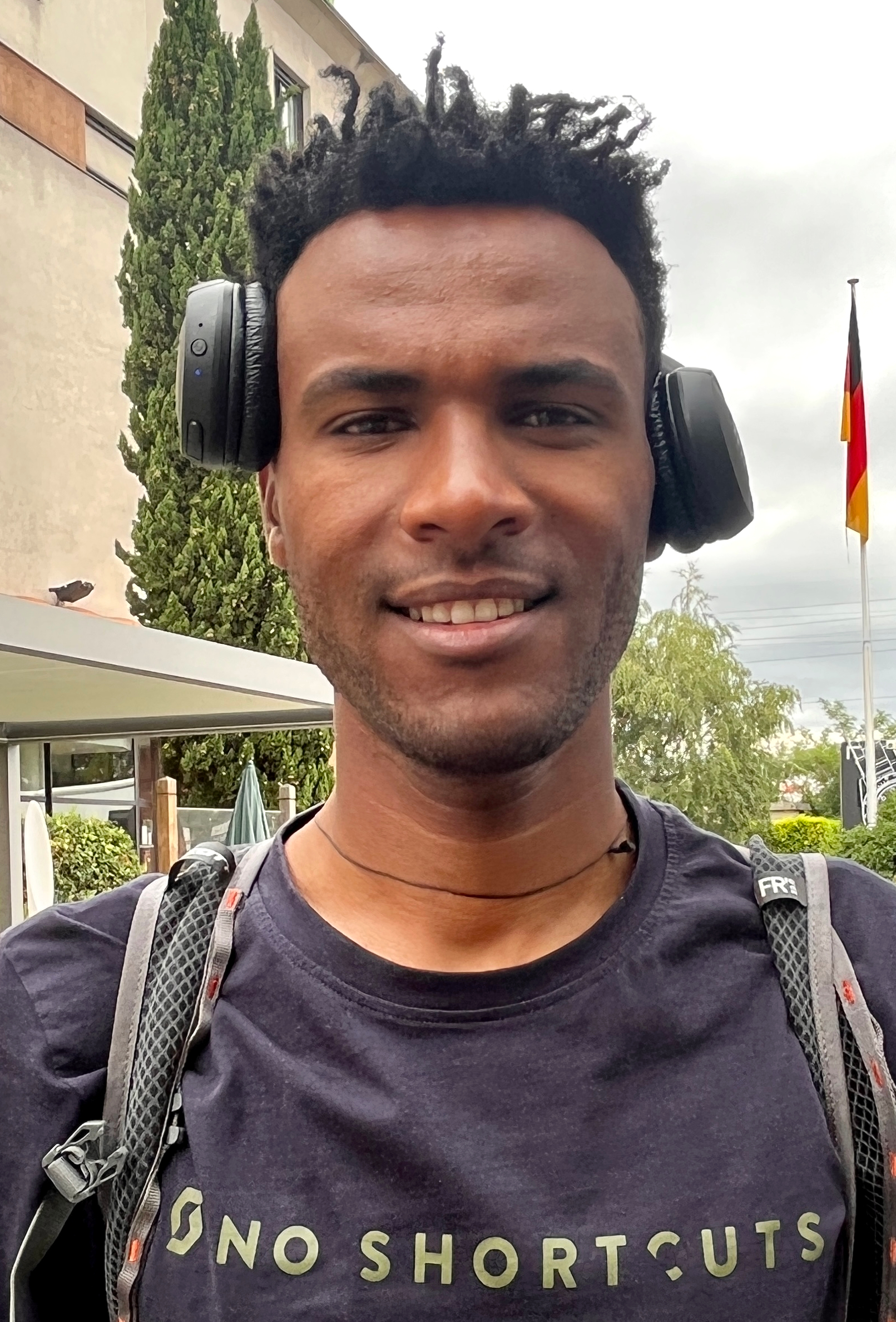
- Negasi Abreha in 2023

Personal information
- Full name: Negasi Haylu Abreha
- Born: 9 May 2000 (age 26) Ethiopia
- Height: 1.86 m (6 ft 1 in)

Cycling career
- Sport: Cycling
- Current team: Vega–Vitalcare–Dynatek
- Discipline: Road
- Role: Rider

Professional teams
- 2019: NiCe–Ethiopia Cycling Team
- 2020–2022: NTT Continental Cycling Team
- 2023–2024: Q36.5 Pro Cycling Team
- 2025–: Sam–Vitalcare–Dynatek

Major wins
- One-day races and Classics National Road Race Championships (2019, 2024)

Negasi Haylu Abreha (born 9 May 2000) is an Ethiopian racing cyclist, who currently rides for UCI Continental team Vega–Vitalcare–Dynatek.

== Personal life ==
Abreha has not been able to return home since violence broke out surrounding his home town in November 2020.

== Career ==
In 2019 Abreha won the national road racing championships beating the competition in a sprint finish. Abreha was selected to ride the 2021 UCI Road World Championships, he raced in the under-23 time trial finishing 64th. At the Giro d'Italia Giovani Under 23 in 2022 Abreha finished 14th overall as the highest placed African in the race. Abreha will join UCI ProTeam Q36.5 Pro Cycling Team for its inaugural season in 2023.

== Major results ==
2018
7th Time trial, African Youth Games
2019
1st Road race, National Road Championships
10th Overall Tour de l'Espoir
2024
National Road Championships

1st Road race
2nd Time trial

African Road Championships

3rd Mixed relay
4th Road race

9th Time trial, African Games
