= 2022 GP Industria & Artigianato di Larciano =

- 2022 UCI ProSeries

Race details
- Dates: 27 March 2022
- Stages: 1
- Distance: 192.2 km (119.4 mi)
- Winning time: 4h 31' 10"

Results
	Winner	Diego Ulissi (ITA)	(UAE Team Emirates)
	Second	Alessandro Fedeli (ITA)	(Italy)
	Third	Xandro Meurisse (BEL)	(Alpecin–Fenix)

The 2022 GP Industria & Artigianato di Larciano (transl. GP Industry & Handicraft of Larciano) was the 53rd edition of the GP Industria & Artigianato di Larciano road cycling one-day race that was held on 27 March 2022. It was held as a 1.Pro event on the 2022 UCI ProSeries.

The 192.2 km (119.4 mi) long race took place in and around Larciano in Tuscany. It covered six laps of a mostly flat 14 km (8.7 mi) loop, followed by almost four laps of a 29.5 km (18.3 mi) loop that features the 8.6 km (5.3 mi) long climb of San Baronto.

== Teams ==
Four UCI WorldTeams, eight UCI ProTeams, eight UCI Continental teams and one national team made up the twenty-one teams that participated in the race. Each team could enter up to seven riders, though many teams entered fewer.

Of the 122 riders in the race, there were only 54 finishers.

UCI WorldTeams

- Astana Qazaqstan Team
- Bora–Hansgrohe
- Trek–Segafredo
- UAE Team Emirates

UCI ProTeams

- Alpecin–Fenix
- Arkéa–Samsic
- Bardiani–CSF–Faizanè
- Bingoal Pauwels Sauces WB
- Drone Hopper–Androni Giocattoli
- Eolo–Kometa
- Equipo Kern Pharma
- Human Powered Health

UCI Continental Teams

- Beltrami TSA–Tre Colli
- Biesse–Carrera
- Team Corratec
- General Store–Essegibi–Fratelli Curia
- Giotti Victoria–Savini Due
- MG.K Vis Colors for Peace VPM
- Work Service–Vitalcare–Vega
- Team Qhubeka

National Teams

- Italy

== Result ==
Result
Rank	Rider	Team	Time
1	Diego Ulissi (ITA)	UAE Team Emirates	4h 31' 10"
2	Alessandro Fedeli (ITA)	Italy	+ 0"
3	Xandro Meurisse (BEL)	Alpecin–Fenix	+ 0"
4	Natnael Tesfatsion (ERI)	Drone Hopper–Androni Giocattoli	+ 0"
5	Andrea Vendrame (ITA)	Italy	+ 0"
6	Maxime Bouet (FRA)	Arkéa–Samsic	+ 0"
7	Tony Gallopin (FRA)	Trek–Segafredo	+ 0"
8	Antonio Tiberi (ITA)	Trek–Segafredo	+ 0"
9	Marc Hirschi (SUI)	UAE Team Emirates	+ 0"
10	Alessandro Verre (ITA)	Arkéa–Samsic	+ 0"
