= Georg Steinhauser =

German cyclist (born 2001)

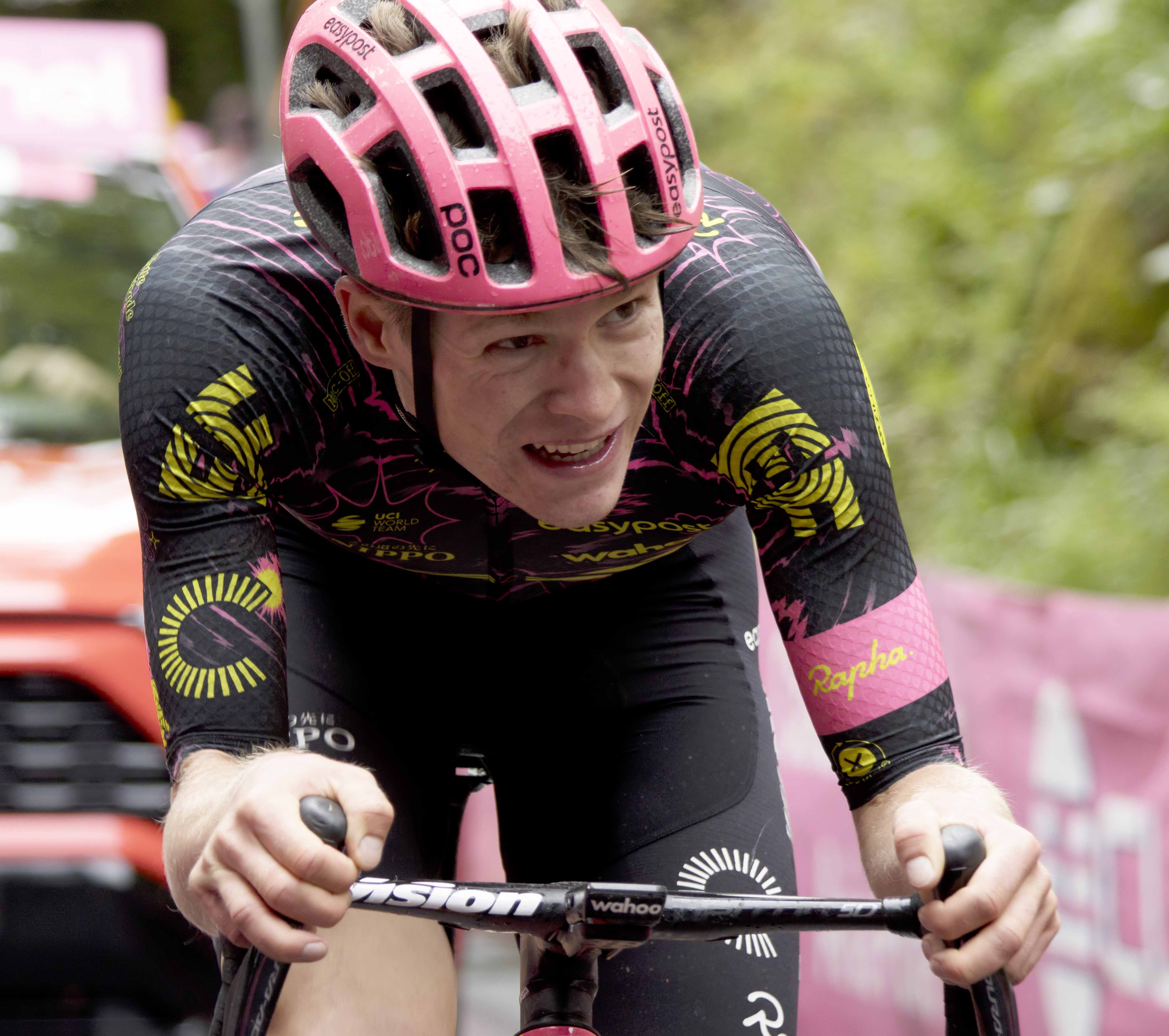
- Steinhauser at the 2024 Giro d'Italia

Personal information
- Born: 21 October 2001 (age 24) Lindenberg im Allgäu, Germany
- Height: 1.88 m (6 ft 2 in)
- Weight: 65 kg (143 lb)

Cycling career
- Sport: Cycling
- Current team: EF Education–EasyPost
- Discipline: Road
- Role: Rider

Professional teams
- 2020–2021: Tirol KTM Cycling Team
- 2022–: EF Education–EasyPost

Major wins
- Grand Tours Giro d'Italia 1 individual stage (2024)

Georg Steinhauser (born 21 October 2001) is a German racing cyclist, who currently rides for UCI WorldTeam EF Education–EasyPost.

For the 2022 season, Steinhauser joined UCI WorldTeam EF Education–EasyPost on a two-year contract while simultaneously taking on a metalworking apprenticeship.

Steinhauser was selected for the 2026 Tour de France.

== Personal life ==
His father Tobias was also a professional cyclist.

He is also the nephew of former Tour de France winner Jan Ullrich.

== Major results ==
2019
1st Overall Ain Bugey Valromey Tour

1st Stage 4

Saarland Trofeo

1st Mountains classification
1st Stage 3b (TTT)

4th Overall Oberösterreich Juniorenrundfahrt
10th Overall Tour du Pays de Vaud
2021
1st Stage 3 Giro della Valle d'Aosta
2nd Overall Tour of Bulgaria

1st Young rider classification

3rd Il Piccolo Lombardia
9th Overall Tour de l'Ain
2022
1st Stage 5 (TTT) Tour de l'Avenir
5th Time trial, National Road Championships
2023
3rd Overall Route d'Occitanie
6th Eschborn–Frankfurt
7th Overall Vuelta a Castilla y León
10th GP Industria & Artigianato di Larciano
2024 (1 pro win)
1st Stage 17 Giro d'Italia
6th Coppa Sabatini
9th Trofeo Matteotti
2026
3rd Overall Paris–Nice

1st Young rider classification

5th Trofeo Calvià
7th Trofeo Andratx–Pollença
8th Trofeo Serra Tramuntana
