= Matteo Badilatti =

Swiss cyclist

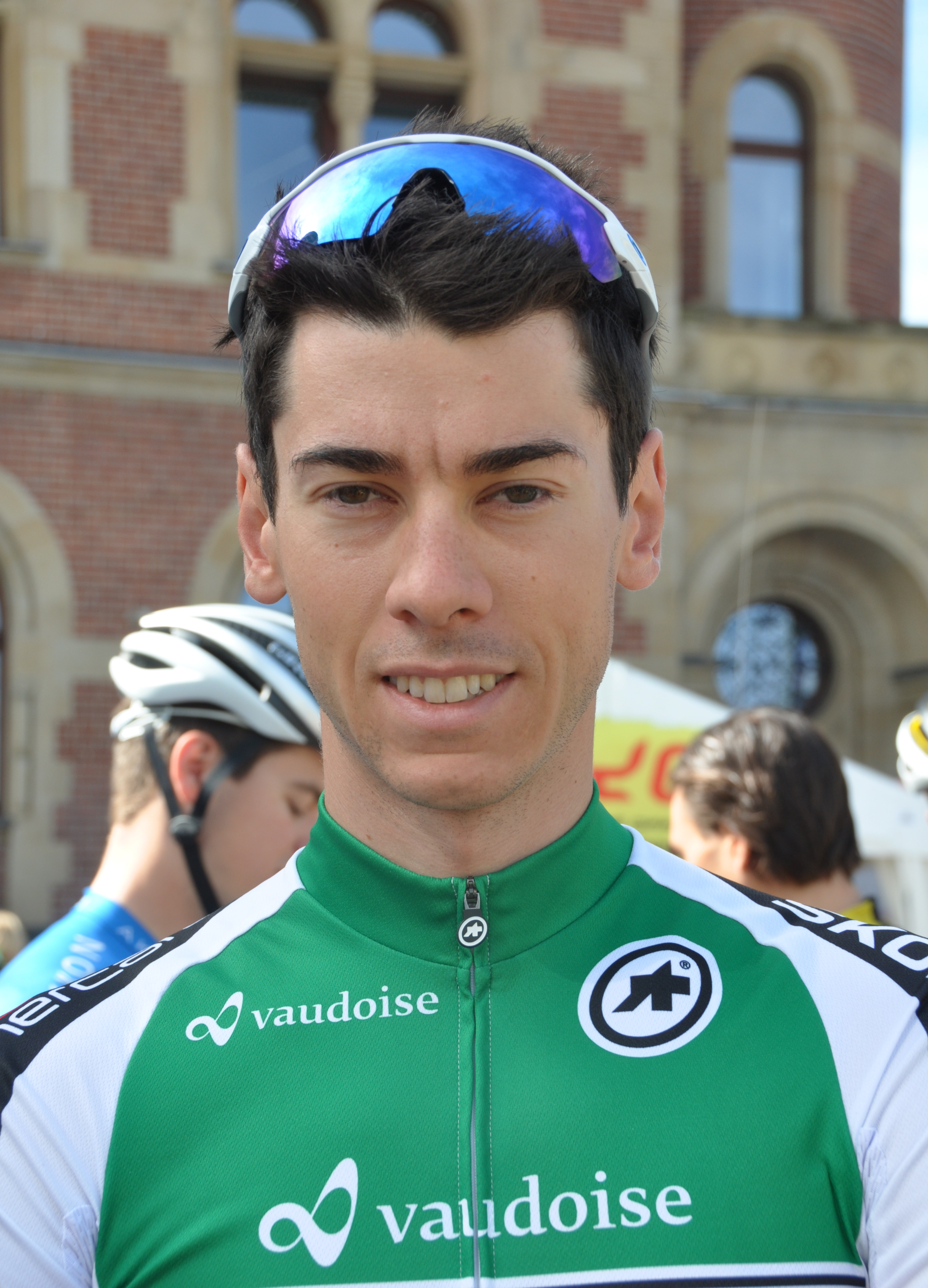
- Badilatti in 2017

Personal information
- Full name: Matteo Badilatti
- Born: 30 July 1992 (age 34) Poschiavo, Switzerland
- Height: 1.78 m (5 ft 10 in)
- Weight: 62 kg (137 lb)

Cycling career
- Sport: Cycling
- Current team: Pinarello–Q36.5 Pro Cycling Team
- Discipline: Road
- Role: Rider
- Rider type: Climber

Amateur team
- 2012–2017: VC Mendrisio–PL Valli

Professional teams
- 2018: Team Vorarlberg Santic
- 2018: Israel Cycling Academy (stagiaire)
- 2019–2020: Israel Cycling Academy
- 2021–2022: Groupama–FDJ
- 2023–: Q36.5 Pro Cycling Team

Matteo Badilatti (born 30 July 1992 in Poschiavo) is a Swiss cyclist, who currently rides for UCI ProTeam Pinarello–Q36.5 Pro Cycling Team. In October 2020, he was named in the startlist for the 2020 Vuelta a España, where he finished 110th overall.

== Major results ==
2017
9th Overall Tour du Jura
2018
2nd Overall Tour de Savoie Mont-Blanc
7th Overall Tour de l'Ain
8th Overall Tour of Hainan
9th Overall Tour of Austria
2019
3rd Overall Tour du Rwanda
2020
3rd Overall Sibiu Cycling Tour
4th Overall Tour de Hongrie
2021
3rd Overall Tour de l'Ain
2022
10th Classic Grand Besançon Doubs
2023 (1 pro win)
1st Stage 6 Tour du Rwanda
4th Overall Sibiu Cycling Tour
5th Overall Tour of Turkey

=== Grand Tour general classification results timeline ===
Grand Tour	2020	2021	2022
Giro d'Italia	—	34	—
Tour de France	—	—	—
Vuelta a España	110	—	—

Legend
—	Did not compete
DNF	Did not finish
