= 2021 Tour de l'Ain =

2021 UCI Europe Tour

Race details
- Dates: 29–31 July 2021
- Stages: 3
- Distance: 402 km (249.8 mi)
- Winning time: 9h 13' 09"

Results
| Jersey awarded to the overall winner | Winner | Michael Storer (AUS) | (Team DSM) |
| | Second | Harm Vanhoucke (BEL) | (Lotto–Soudal) |
| | Third | Matteo Badilatti (SUI) | (Groupama–FDJ) |
| Jersey awarded to the points classification winner | Points | Michael Storer (AUS) | (Team DSM) |
| Jersey awarded to the mountains classification winner | Mountains | Michael Storer (AUS) | (Team DSM) |
| Jersey awarded to the youth classification winner | Youth | Andrea Bagioli (ITA) | (Deceuninck–Quick-Step) |
| Jersey awarded to the combativity classification winner | Combativity | Michael Storer (AUS) | (Team DSM) |
| | Team | Lotto–Soudal | |

The 2021 Tour de l'Ain was a men's road cycling stage race that took place from 29 to 31 July 2021 in the French department of Ain. It was the 33rd edition of the Tour de l'Ain, which was a 2.1 event on the 2021 UCI Europe Tour calendar.

== Teams ==
Eight of the nineteen UCI WorldTeams, eight UCI ProTeams, three UCI Continental teams, and two national teams made up the twenty-one teams that participated in the race. With five riders, Hagens Berman Axeon was the only team to not enter a full squad of six riders. Of the 125 riders who started the race, 104 finished.

UCI WorldTeams

- AG2R Citroën Team
- Cofidis
- Deceuninck–Quick-Step
- Groupama–FDJ
- Intermarché–Wanty–Gobert Matériaux
- Lotto–Soudal
- Team DSM
- Trek–Segafredo

UCI ProTeams

- Alpecin–Fenix
- Arkéa–Samsic
- B&B Hotels p/b KTM
- Caja Rural–Seguros RGA
- Delko
- Eolo–Kometa
- Gazprom–RusVelo
- Team TotalEnergies

UCI Continental Teams

- Hagens Berman Axeon
- St. Michel–Auber93
- Xelliss–Roubaix–Lille Métropole

National Teams

- France
- Germany U–23

== Route ==
Stage characteristics and winners
| Stage | Date | Course | Distance | Type | Stage winner |
|---|---|---|---|---|---|
| 1 | 29 July | Parc des Oiseaux to Bourg-en-Bresse | 141 km (88 mi) | Flat stage | Álvaro Hodeg (COL) |
| 2 | 30 July | Lagnieu to Saint-Vulbas | 136 km (85 mi) | Hilly stage | Georg Zimmermann (GER) |
| 3 | 31 July | Izernore to Lélex Monts-Jura | 125 km (78 mi) | Medium mountain stage | Michael Storer (AUS) |
| Total | | | 402 km (250 mi) | | |

== Stages ==
=== Stage 1 ===
29 July 2021 – Parc des Oiseaux to Bourg-en-Bresse, 141 km (88 mi)

Stage 1 Result
| Rank | Rider | Team | Time |
|---|---|---|---|
| 1 | Álvaro Hodeg (COL) | Deceuninck–Quick-Step | 3h 04' 57" |
| 2 | Nacer Bouhanni (FRA) | Arkéa–Samsic | + 0" |
| 3 | Bryan Coquard (FRA) | B&B Hotels p/b KTM | + 0" |
| 4 | Niccolò Bonifazio (ITA) | Team TotalEnergies | + 0" |
| 5 | Jason Tesson (FRA) | St. Michel–Auber93 | + 0" |
| 6 | Riccardo Minali (ITA) | Intermarché–Wanty–Gobert Matériaux | + 0" |
| 7 | Florian Vermeersch (BEL) | Lotto–Soudal | + 0" |
| 8 | Emmanuel Morin (FRA) | Cofidis | + 0" |
| 9 | Clément Venturini (FRA) | AG2R Citroën Team | + 0" |
| 10 | Dries De Bondt (BEL) | Alpecin–Fenix | + 0" |

General classification after Stage 1
| Rank | Rider | Team | Time |
|---|---|---|---|
| 1 | Álvaro Hodeg (COL) | Deceuninck–Quick-Step | 3h 04' 47" |
| 2 | Nacer Bouhanni (FRA) | Arkéa–Samsic | + 4" |
| 3 | Bryan Coquard (FRA) | B&B Hotels p/b KTM | + 6" |
| 4 | Niccolò Bonifazio (ITA) | Team TotalEnergies | + 10" |
| 5 | Jason Tesson (FRA) | St. Michel–Auber93 | + 10" |
| 6 | Riccardo Minali (ITA) | Intermarché–Wanty–Gobert Matériaux | + 10" |
| 7 | Florian Vermeersch (BEL) | Lotto–Soudal | + 10" |
| 8 | Emmanuel Morin (FRA) | Cofidis | + 10" |
| 9 | Clément Venturini (FRA) | AG2R Citroën Team | + 10" |
| 10 | Dries De Bondt (BEL) | Alpecin–Fenix | + 10" |

=== Stage 2 ===
30 July 2021 – Lagnieu to Saint-Vulbas, 136 km (85 mi)

Stage 2 Result
| Rank | Rider | Team | Time |
|---|---|---|---|
| 1 | Georg Zimmermann (GER) | Intermarché–Wanty–Gobert Matériaux | 3h 05' 42" |
| 2 | Michael Storer (AUS) | Team DSM | + 0" |
| 3 | Harm Vanhoucke (BEL) | Lotto–Soudal | + 0" |
| 4 | Rémy Rochas (FRA) | Cofidis | + 0" |
| 5 | Matteo Badilatti (SUI) | Groupama–FDJ | + 0" |
| 6 | Georg Steinhauser (GER) | Germany U–23 | + 0" |
| 7 | José Manuel Díaz (ESP) | Delko | + 18" |
| 8 | Aurélien Paret-Peintre (FRA) | AG2R Citroën Team | + 22" |
| 9 | Quinn Simmons (USA) | Trek–Segafredo | + 22" |
| 10 | Pierre Latour (FRA) | Team TotalEnergies | + 22" |

General classification after Stage 2
| Rank | Rider | Team | Time |
|---|---|---|---|
| 1 | Georg Zimmermann (GER) | Intermarché–Wanty–Gobert Matériaux | 6h 10' 29" |
| 2 | Michael Storer (AUS) | Team DSM | + 4" |
| 3 | Harm Vanhoucke (BEL) | Lotto–Soudal | + 6" |
| 4 | Rémy Rochas (FRA) | Cofidis | + 10" |
| 5 | Georg Steinhauser (GER) | Germany U–23 | + 10" |
| 6 | Matteo Badilatti (SUI) | Groupama–FDJ | + 10" |
| 7 | José Manuel Díaz (ESP) | Delko | + 28" |
| 8 | Aurélien Paret-Peintre (FRA) | AG2R Citroën Team | + 32" |
| 9 | Pierre Latour (FRA) | Team TotalEnergies | + 32" |
| 10 | Clément Champoussin (FRA) | AG2R Citroën Team | + 32" |

=== Stage 3 ===
31 July 2021 – Izernore to Lélex Monts-Jura, 125 km (78 mi)

Stage 3 Result
| Rank | Rider | Team | Time |
|---|---|---|---|
| 1 | Michael Storer (AUS) | Team DSM | 3h 02' 46" |
| 2 | Andrea Bagioli (ITA) | Deceuninck–Quick-Step | + 43" |
| 3 | Mattias Skjelmose Jensen (DEN) | Trek–Segafredo | + 43" |
| 4 | Harm Vanhoucke (BEL) | Lotto–Soudal | + 43" |
| 5 | Matteo Badilatti (SUI) | Groupama–FDJ | + 45" |
| 6 | Clément Champoussin (FRA) | AG2R Citroën Team | + 45" |
| 7 | Maxime Bouet (FRA) | Arkéa–Samsic | + 1' 23" |
| 8 | Olivier Le Gac (FRA) | Groupama–FDJ | + 1' 23" |
| 9 | Dmitry Strakhov (RUS) | Gazprom–RusVelo | + 1' 23" |
| 10 | Andreas Kron (DEN) | Lotto–Soudal | + 1' 23" |

General classification after Stage 3
| Rank | Rider | Team | Time |
|---|---|---|---|
| 1 | Michael Storer (AUS) | Team DSM | 9h 13' 09" |
| 2 | Harm Vanhoucke (BEL) | Lotto–Soudal | + 55" |
| 3 | Matteo Badilatti (SUI) | Groupama–FDJ | + 1' 01" |
| 4 | Andrea Bagioli (ITA) | Deceuninck–Quick-Step | + 1' 15" |
| 5 | Mattias Skjelmose Jensen (DEN) | Trek–Segafredo | + 1' 17" |
| 6 | Clément Champoussin (FRA) | AG2R Citroën Team | + 1' 23" |
| 7 | Georg Zimmermann (GER) | Intermarché–Wanty–Gobert Matériaux | + 1' 29" |
| 8 | Rémy Rochas (FRA) | Cofidis | + 1' 39" |
| 9 | Georg Steinhauser (GER) | Germany U–23 | + 1' 46" |
| 10 | José Manuel Díaz (ESP) | Delko | + 1' 57" |

== Classification leadership ==
Classification leadership by stage
| Stage | Winner | General classification | Points classification | Mountains classification | Young rider classification | Team classification | Combativity award |
|---|---|---|---|---|---|---|---|
| 1 | Álvaro Hodeg | Álvaro Hodeg | Álvaro Hodeg | Alexander Tarlton | Jason Tesson | AG2R Citroën Team | Antoine Duchesne |
| 2 | Georg Zimmermann | Georg Zimmermann | Georg Zimmermann | Sylvain Moniquet | Georg Steinhauser | Lotto–Soudal | Florent Castellarnau |
| 3 | Michael Storer | Michael Storer | Michael Storer | Michael Storer | Andrea Bagioli | Lotto–Soudal | Victor Lafay |
| Final | | Michael Storer | Michael Storer | Michael Storer | Andrea Bagioli | Lotto–Soudal | Michael Storer |

- On stage 2, Nacer Bouhanni, who was second in the points classification, wore the green jersey, because first placed Álvaro Hodeg wore the yellow jersey as the leader of the general classification.
- On stage 3, Álvaro Hodeg, who was second in the points classification, wore the green jersey, because first placed Georg Zimmermann wore the yellow jersey as the leader of the general classification.

== Final classification standings ==
Legend
| Denotes the winner of the general classification | Denotes the winner of the young rider classification |
| Denotes the winner of the points classification | Denotes the winner of the combativity award |
| Denotes the winner of the mountains classification | |

=== General classification ===
Final general classification (1–10)
| Rank | Rider | Team | Time |
|---|---|---|---|
| 1 | Michael Storer (AUS) | Team DSM | 9h 13' 09" |
| 2 | Harm Vanhoucke (BEL) | Lotto–Soudal | + 55" |
| 3 | Matteo Badilatti (SUI) | Groupama–FDJ | + 1' 01" |
| 4 | Andrea Bagioli (ITA) | Deceuninck–Quick-Step | + 1' 15" |
| 5 | Mattias Skjelmose Jensen (DEN) | Trek–Segafredo | + 1' 17" |
| 6 | Clément Champoussin (FRA) | AG2R Citroën Team | + 1' 23" |
| 7 | Georg Zimmermann (GER) | Intermarché–Wanty–Gobert Matériaux | + 1' 29" |
| 8 | Rémy Rochas (FRA) | Cofidis | + 1' 39" |
| 9 | Georg Steinhauser (GER) | Germany U–23 | + 1' 46" |
| 10 | José Manuel Díaz (ESP) | Delko | + 1' 57" |

=== Points classification ===
Final points classification (1–10)
| Rank | Rider | Team | Points |
|---|---|---|---|
| 1 | Michael Storer (AUS) | Team DSM | 45 |
| 2 | Harm Vanhoucke (BEL) | Lotto–Soudal | 30 |
| 3 | Georg Zimmermann (GER) | Intermarché–Wanty–Gobert Matériaux | 25 |
| 4 | Álvaro Hodeg (COL) | Deceuninck–Quick-Step | 25 |
| 5 | Matteo Badilatti (SUI) | Groupama–FDJ | 24 |
| 6 | Andrea Bagioli (ITA) | Deceuninck–Quick-Step | 20 |
| 7 | Mattias Skjelmose Jensen (DEN) | Trek–Segafredo | 16 |
| 8 | Bryan Coquard (FRA) | B&B Hotels p/b KTM | 16 |
| 9 | Rémy Rochas (FRA) | Cofidis | 14 |
| 10 | José Manuel Díaz (ESP) | Delko | 12 |

=== Mountains classification ===
Final mountains classification (1–10)
| Rank | Rider | Team | Points |
|---|---|---|---|
| 1 | Michael Storer (AUS) | Team DSM | 20 |
| 2 | Sylvain Moniquet (BEL) | Lotto–Soudal | 15 |
| 3 | Simon Guglielmi (FRA) | Groupama–FDJ | 13 |
| 4 | Clément Champoussin (FRA) | AG2R Citroën Team | 12 |
| 5 | Sebastian Schönberger (AUT) | B&B Hotels p/b KTM | 10 |
| 6 | Matteo Badilatti (SUI) | Groupama–FDJ | 10 |
| 7 | Rémy Rochas (FRA) | Cofidis | 8 |
| 8 | Carmelo Urbano (ESP) | Caja Rural–Seguros RGA | 8 |
| 9 | Quentin Pacher (FRA) | B&B Hotels p/b KTM | 8 |
| 10 | Victor Lafay (FRA) | Cofidis | 8 |

=== Young rider classification ===
Final young rider classification (1–10)
| Rank | Rider | Team | Time |
|---|---|---|---|
| 1 | Andrea Bagioli (ITA) | Deceuninck–Quick-Step | 9h 14' 24" |
| 2 | Mattias Skjelmose Jensen (DEN) | Trek–Segafredo | + 2" |
| 3 | Clément Champoussin (FRA) | AG2R Citroën Team | + 8" |
| 4 | Georg Steinhauser (GER) | Germany U–23 | + 31" |
| 5 | Andreas Kron (DEN) | Lotto–Soudal | + 46" |
| 6 | Sean Quinn (USA) | Hagens Berman Axeon | + 2' 08" |
| 7 | Maxime Chevalier (FRA) | B&B Hotels p/b KTM | + 2' 08" |
| 8 | Jakob Geßner (GER) | Germany U–23 | + 2' 08" |
| 9 | Jhojan García (COL) | Caja Rural–Seguros RGA | + 2' 08" |
| 10 | Michel Ries (LUX) | Trek–Segafredo | + 2' 08" |

=== Team classification ===
Final team classification (1–10)
| Rank | Team | Time |
|---|---|---|
| 1 | Lotto–Soudal | 27h 44' 28" |
| 2 | Groupama–FDJ | + 2" |
| 3 | France | + 9' 02" |
| 4 | Germany U–23 | + 13' 32" |
| 5 | B&B Hotels p/b KTM | + 13' 34" |
| 6 | Trek–Segafredo | + 13' 44" |
| 7 | AG2R Citroën Team | + 13' 58" |
| 8 | Gazprom–RusVelo | + 15' 06" |
| 9 | Arkéa–Samsic | + 18' 05" |
| 10 | Eolo–Kometa | + 27' 36" |
