= Marchaux-Chaudefontaine =

- Commune
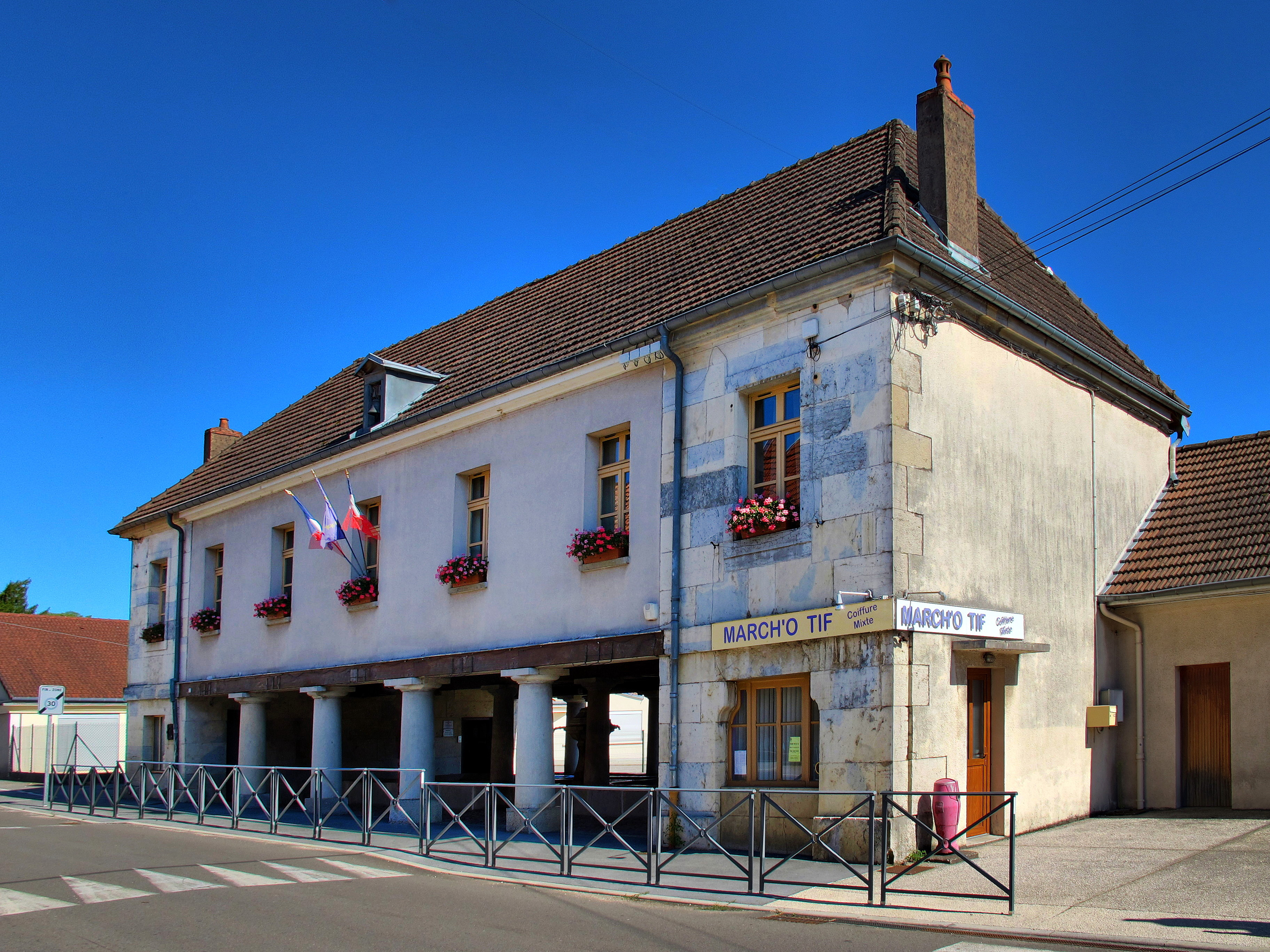
- The town hall in Marchaux

- Coat of arms
- Location of Marchaux-Chaudefontaine
- Location within France Location within Bourgogne-Franche-Comté
- Coordinates: 47°19′27″N 6°08′01″E
- Country: France
- Region: Bourgogne-Franche-Comté
- Department: Doubs
- Arrondissement: Besançon
- Canton: Besançon-4
- Intercommunality: Grand Besançon Métropole

Government
  - Mayor (2020–2026): Patrick Corne
- Area^{1}: 16.39 km^{2} (6.33 sq mi)
- Population (2023): 1,447
  - Density: 88.29/km^{2} (228.7/sq mi)
- Time zone: UTC+01:00 (CET)
  - Summer (DST): UTC+02:00 (CEST)
- INSEE/Postal code: 25368 /25640
- ^{1} French Land Register data, which excludes lakes, ponds, glaciers > 1 km^{2} (0.386 sq mi or 247 acres) and river estuaries.

Marchaux-Chaudefontaine (French pronunciation: [maʁʃo ʃodfɔ̃tɛn]) is a commune in the department of Doubs, eastern France. The municipality was established on 1 January 2018 by merger of the former communes of Marchaux (the seat) and Chaudefontaine.

== See also ==
- Communes of the Doubs department
