= Mulu Hailemichael =

Ethiopian cyclist

Personal information
- Full name: Mulu Kinfe Hailemichael
- Born: 12 January 1999 (age 27) Adigrat, Ethiopia
- Height: 1.58 m (5 ft 2 in)
- Weight: 50 kg (110 lb)

Cycling career
- Sport: Cycling
- Discipline: Road
- Role: Rider

Amateur team
- 2022: Caja Rural–Alea

Professional teams
- 2019: Dimension Data for Qhubeka
- 2020–2021: Nippo–Delko–One Provence
- 2022: Global 6 Cycling
- 2023–2024: Caja Rural–Seguros RGA

Mulu Kinfe Hailemichael (born 12 January 1999) is an Ethiopian cyclist, who last rode for UCI ProTeam Caja Rural–Seguros RGA.

== Major results ==
2018
3rd Overall Tour of Rwanda
2019
5th Overall Giro della Valle d'Aosta

1st Mountains classification

2020
8th Overall Tour du Rwanda

1st Stage 2

2023
4th Overall Okolo Slovenska
