= 2023 Eschborn–Frankfurt =

One-day cycling race in Germany

2023 UCI World Tour, race 21 of 35

Race details
- Dates: 1 May 2023
- Stages: 1
- Distance: 203.8 km (126.6 mi)
- Winning time: 4h 51' 27"

Results
	Winner	Søren Kragh Andersen (DEN)	(Alpecin–Deceuninck)
	Second	Patrick Konrad (AUT)	(Bora–Hansgrohe)
	Third	Alessandro Fedeli (ITA)	(Q36.5 Pro Cycling Team)

The 2023 Eschborn–Frankfurt was a road cycling one-day race that took place on 1 May 2023 in the Frankfurt Rhein-Main metro area in southwest Germany. It was the 60th edition of Eschborn–Frankfurt, and the 21st event of the 2023 UCI World Tour.

== Teams ==
10 of the 18 UCI WorldTeams and nine UCI ProTeams made up the nineteen teams that participated in the race. UAE Team Emirates, Lotto–Dstny and Team TotalEnergies each fielded six riders and were the only teams to not enter a full squad of seven. In total, 129 riders started the race, of which 99 finished.

UCI WorldTeams

- Alpecin–Deceuninck
- Arkéa–Samsic
- Bora–Hansgrohe
- Cofidis
- EF Education–EasyPost
- Intermarché–Circus–Wanty
- Team Bahrain Victorious
- Team Jayco–AlUla
- Team DSM
- UAE Team Emirates

UCI ProTeams

- Bingoal WB
- Burgos BH
- Green Project–Bardiani–CSF–Faizanè
- Israel–Premier Tech
- Lotto–Dstny
- Q36.5 Pro Cycling Team
- Team Flanders–Baloise
- Team TotalEnergies
- Uno-X Pro Cycling Team

== Result ==
Result
Rank	Rider	Team	Time
1	Søren Kragh Andersen (DEN)	Alpecin–Deceuninck	4h 51' 27"
2	Patrick Konrad (AUT)	Bora–Hansgrohe	+ 0"
3	Alessandro Fedeli (ITA)	Q36.5 Pro Cycling Team	+ 0"
4	Marc Hirschi (SUI)	UAE Team Emirates	+ 0"
5	Lorenzo Rota (ITA)	Intermarché–Circus–Wanty	+ 0"
6	Georg Steinhauser (GER)	EF Education–EasyPost	+ 0"
7	Georg Zimmermann (GER)	Intermarché–Circus–Wanty	+ 0"
8	Stephen Williams (GBR)	Israel–Premier Tech	+ 0"
9	Ben Hermans (BEL)	Israel–Premier Tech	+ 0"
10	Martin Marcellusi (ITA)	Green Project–Bardiani–CSF–Faizanè	+ 3"
