= Joseph Areruya =

Rwandan cyclist (born 1996)

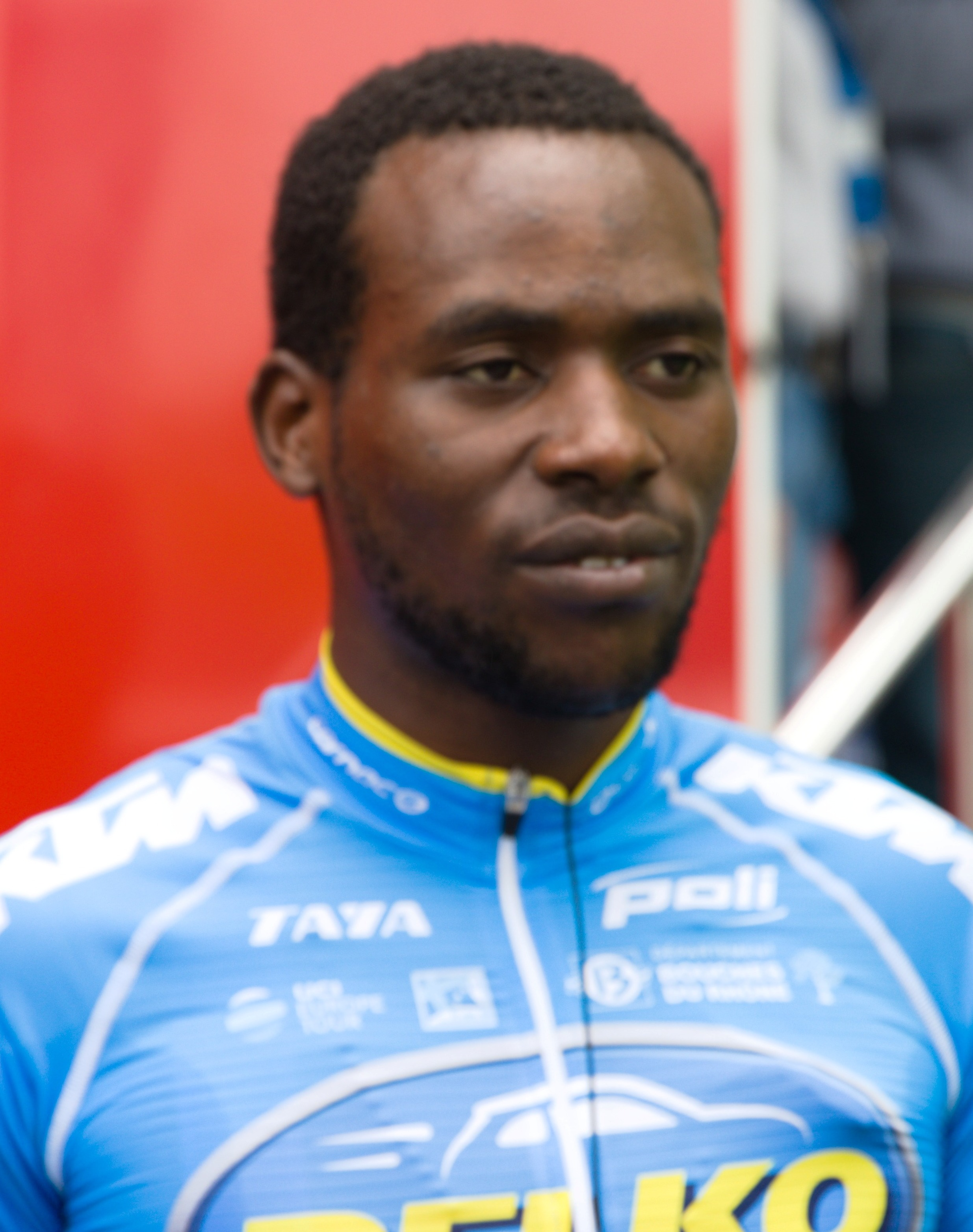
- Areruya in 2018

Personal information
- Full name: Joseph Areruya
- Born: 1 January 1996 (age 30) Rwamagana, Rwanda
- Height: 1.76 m (5 ft 9 in)
- Weight: 74 kg (163 lb)

Cycling career
- Sport: Cycling
- Current team: Inovotec
- Discipline: Road
- Role: Rider
- Rider type: All-rounder

Amateur teams
- 2016: Les Amis Sportifs de Rwamagana
- 2020: Pédale Pilotine
- 2022: Pédale Pilotine–Blue Car
- 2023–: Inovotec

Professional teams
- 2017–2018: Dimension Data for Qhubeka
- 2018–2019: Delko–Marseille Provence KTM
- 2021–2022: Benediction Ignite

Joseph Areruya (born 1 January 1996) is a Rwandan cyclist, who rides for Rwandan amateur team Inovotec. In 2017 he won the Tour du Rwanda. He became the first cyclist from Rwanda to ride in the Paris–Roubaix road race, when he took part in the 2019 edition.

== Major results ==
2013
9th Road race, National Road Championships
2014
7th Time trial, National Road Championships
2015
National Road Championships

2nd Road race
3rd Time trial
3rd Under-23 time trial

2nd Overall Tour du Rwanda
5th Overall Tour de Côte d'Ivoire
7th Road race, African Games
2016
1st Circuit de Constantine
2nd Overall Tour de Blida

1st Young rider classification

2nd Road race, National Road Championships
2nd GP de la Ville d'Oran
4th Overall Tour du Rwanda

1st Stage 4

6th Overall Tour International de Sétif
6th Circuit d'Alger
8th Overall Tour de Constantine
9th Time trial, African Road Championships
2017
1st Overall Tour du Rwanda

1st Stages 1 & 3

1st Stage 5a Giro Ciclistico d'Italia
African Road Championships

3rd Team time trial
6th Road race
7th Time trial

2018
1st Time trial, National Road Championships
1st Overall La Tropicale Amissa Bongo

1st Young rider classification
1st Stage 4

1st Overall Coupe des Nations de l'Espoir Blue Line

1st Points classification

African Road Championships

2nd Team time trial
3rd Time trial
6th Road race

2019
1st Time trial, National Road Championships
African Games

3rd Team time trial
7th Time trial

9th Overall Tour du Rwanda
2021
African Road Championships

2nd Team time trial
7th Road race

2022
1st Stage 1 Tour de Martinique
