= Samuel Mugisha =

Rwandan cyclist (born 1997)

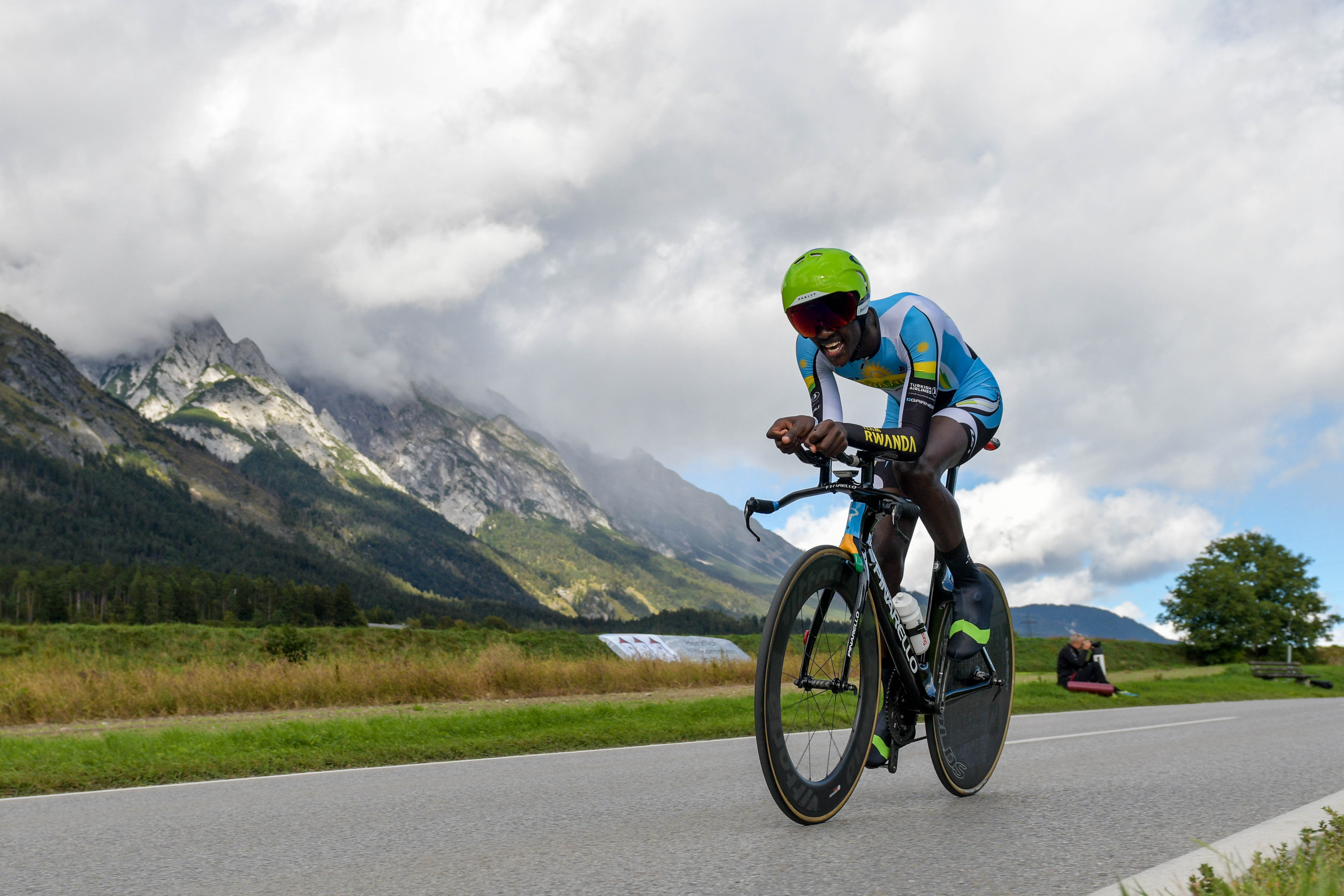
- Mugisha in 2018

Personal information
- Full name: Samuel Mugisha
- Born: 5 December 1997 (age 28) Mukamira, Nyabihu District, Rwanda
- Height: 1.75 m (5 ft 9 in)
- Weight: 62 kg (137 lb)

Cycling career
- Sport: Cycling
- Current team: ProTouch
- Discipline: Road
- Role: Rider

Amateur teams
- 2016: Benediction Cycling Team
- 2020–2021: La Roche-sur-Yon Vendée Cyclisme

Professional teams
- 2017–2019: Dimension Data for Qhubeka
- 2021–: ProTouch

Samuel Mugisha (born 5 December 1997) is a Rwandan cyclist, who currently rides for UCI Continental team ProTouch. He won the Tour of Rwanda in 2018.

In September 2022, Mugisha traveled to the United States for the 2022 Maryland Cycling Classic. However, after arriving at the airport he did not arrive at the hotel and a day later he was not at the start of the race, after which his team reported him missing. Camera footage from the airport showed Mugisha passing through passport control and getting into the car with two people he "clearly knew".

== Major results ==
2015
8th Time trial, National Junior Road Championships
2016
1st Mountains classification, Tour of Rwanda
2017
3rd Team time trial, African Road Championships
2018
1st Overall Tour of Rwanda

1st Young rider classification
1st Stage 2

1st Stage 3 Tour de l'Espoir
1st Mountains classification, Giro della Valle d'Aosta
2019
National Road Championships

3rd Time trial
4th Road race

2020
6th Overall Grand Prix Chantal Biya

1st Mountains classification

2022
2nd Time trial, National Road Championships
