= Przemysław Kasperkiewicz =

Polish racing cyclist (born 1994)

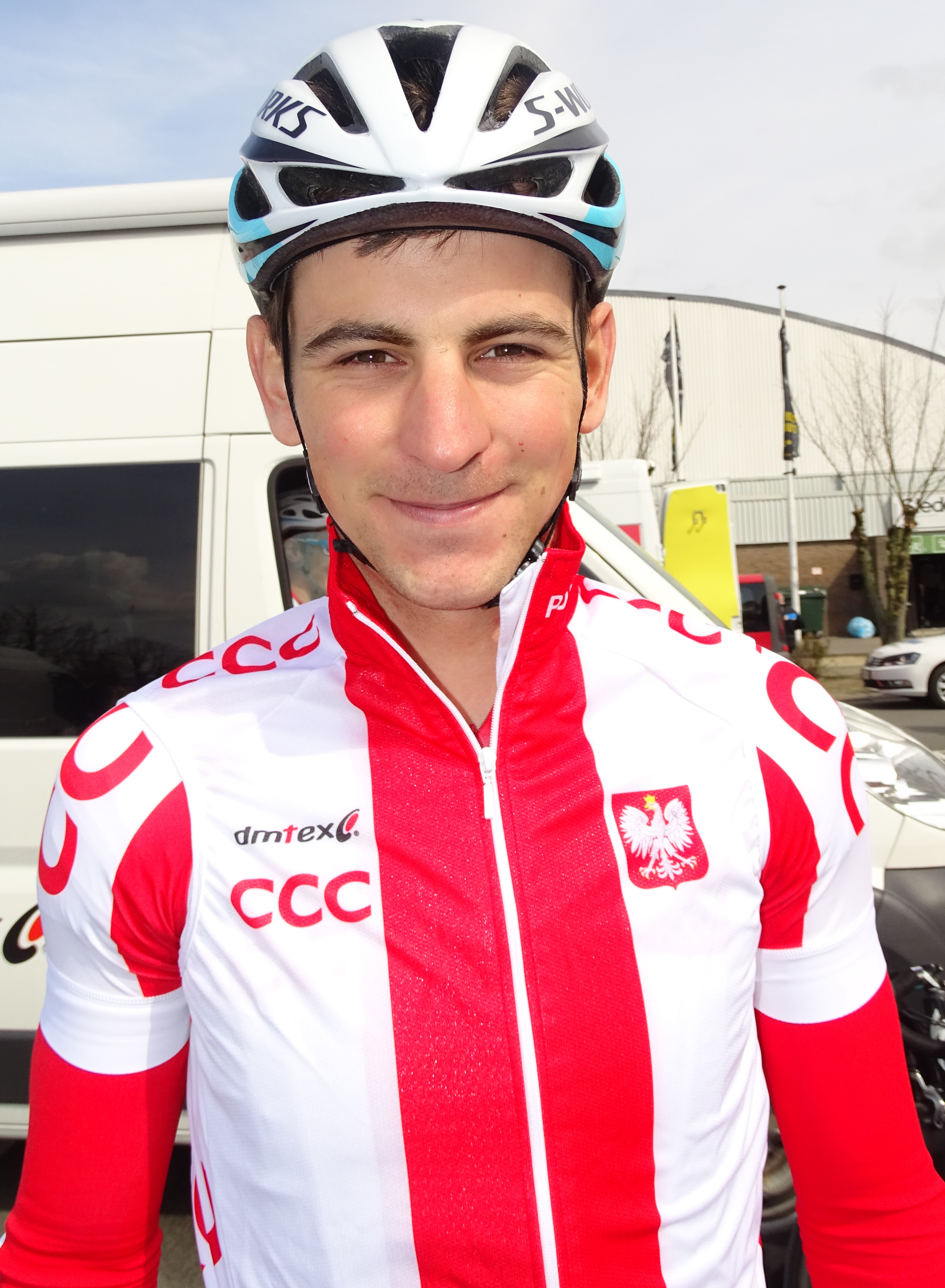
- Kasperkiewicz in 2016.

Personal information
- Full name: Przemysław Kasperkiewicz
- Born: 1 March 1994 (age 32) Kalisz, Poland
- Height: 1.82 m (6 ft 0 in)
- Weight: 71 kg (157 lb)

Cycling career
- Sport: Cycling
- Current team: CIC Pro Cycling Academy
- Discipline: Road cycling
- Role: Rider

Amateur teams
- 2004–2012: KTK Kalisz
- 2013: WV De Jonge Renner
- 2020–2021: Team UC Nantes Atlantique

Professional teams
- 2014: Bauknecht–Author
- 2015–2016: AWT–GreenWay
- 2017: An Post–Chain Reaction
- 2017: Quick-Step Floors (stagiaire)
- 2018–2019: Delko–Marseille Provence KTM

Przemysław Kasperkiewicz (born 1 March 1994) is a Polish racing cyclist, who most recently rode for French amateur team Team UC Nantes Atlantique in 2021.

== Career ==
=== Early years ===
Kasperkiewicz took up cycling at a very early age and competed in track and road cycling with a local club – KTK Kalisz. He showed a lot of promise as a junior rider, winning medals and national titles on the track and taking 2nd in the international junior race, the Tour de la Région de Lódz.

Coming to the Under-23 category Kasperkiewicz moved to the Netherlands and joined the WV De Jonge Renner cycling club. He raced both in Polish and Dutch races, putting his prowess on display with 6th place in the Carpathian Couriers Race and 2nd in the National Under-23 Time Trial Championships.

=== Professional career ===
In 2014, Kasperkiewicz turned professional at the age of 19, signing a one-year deal with Czech-based continental outfit Bauknecht–Author. He finished 3rd overall in the Carpathian Couriers Race and shortly afterwards took his first professional victory after a successful breakaway in stage 1 of the Peace Race U23. In June Kasperkiewicz took part in the National Championships, taking silver in the under-23 men's time trial for the second consecutive time. He did not start the under-23 road race – despite being only 20, he decided to participate in the elite race, eventually finishing 4th. Following those performances, he was selected for the Polish national team for the Tour de Pologne and the Tour de l'Avenir.

In November 2014, he signed a contract with AWT–GreenWay, development team for UCI World Tour squad Etixx–Quick-Step.

== Major results ==
2011
9th Overall Coupe du Président de la Ville de Grudziadz
2012
2nd Time trial, National Junior Road Championships
2nd Overall Tour de la Région de Lódz
7th Overall Grand Prix Rüebliland
2013
2nd Time trial, National Under-23 Road Championships
6th Overall Carpathian Couriers Race
2014
1st Stage 1 Course de la Paix U23
National Road Championships

2nd Under-23 time trial
4th Road race

3rd Overall Carpathian Couriers Race
5th Tour Bohemia
2015
9th La Côte Picarde
2016
3rd Time trial, National Under-23 Road Championships
5th Overall Paris–Arras Tour

1st Points classification

5th Overall Olympia's Tour
9th Road race, UEC European Under-23 Road Championships
2017
An Post Rás

1st Mountains classification
1st Stage 8

1st Stage 5 Tour de Bretagne
6th Rutland–Melton International CiCLE Classic
2019
1st Stage 6 Tour du Rwanda
