= Chaudefontaine, Doubs =

Former commune in Bourgogne-Franche-Comté, France

Chaudefontaine
- Part of Marchaux-Chaudefontaine
- Location of Chaudefontaine
- Location within France Location within Bourgogne-Franche-Comté
- Coordinates: 47°20′25″N 6°09′38″E
- Country: France
- Region: Bourgogne-Franche-Comté
- Department: Doubs
- Arrondissement: Besançon
- Canton: Besançon-4
- Commune: Marchaux-Chaudefontaine
- Area^{1}: 6.33 km^{2} (2.44 sq mi)
- Highest elevation: 448 m (1,470 ft)
- Lowest elevation: 255 m (837 ft)
- Population (2015): 212
  - Density: 33.5/km^{2} (86.7/sq mi)
- Time zone: UTC+01:00 (CET)
  - Summer (DST): UTC+02:00 (CEST)
- Postal code: 25640
- ^{1} French Land Register data, which excludes lakes, ponds, glaciers > 1 km^{2} (0.386 sq mi or 247 acres) and river estuaries.

Chaudefontaine (French pronunciation: [ʃodfɔ̃tɛn]) is a former commune in the Doubs department in the Bourgogne-Franche-Comté region in eastern France. On 1 January 2018, it was merged into the new commune of Marchaux-Chaudefontaine.

== See also ==
- Communes of the Doubs department
