= Adrien Guillonnet =

French cyclist

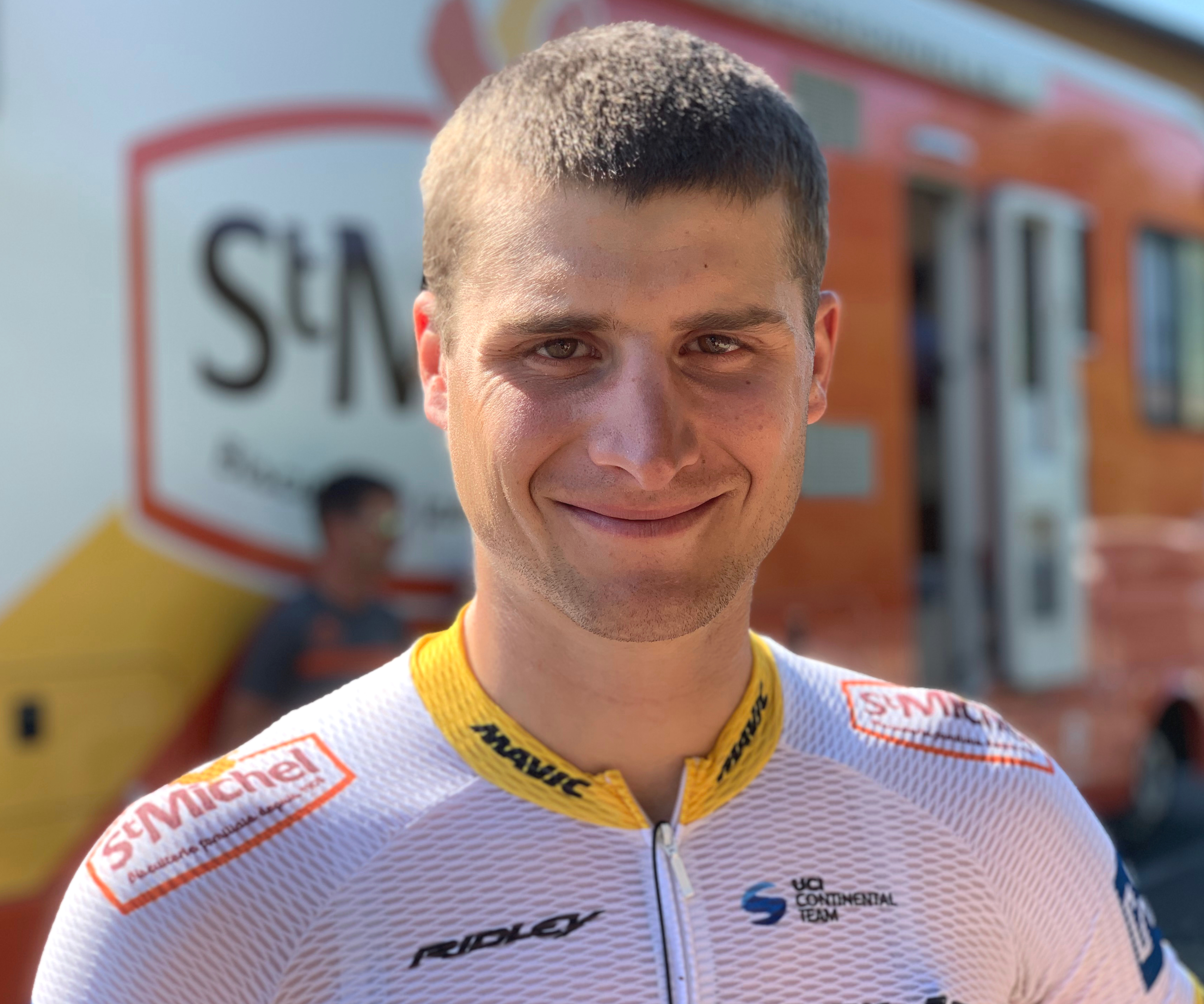
- Guillonnet at the 2020 Tour de l'Ain

Personal information
- Born: 21 November 1993 (age 32) Marcoussis, France
- Height: 1.84 m (6 ft 0 in)
- Weight: 69 kg (152 lb)

Cycling career
- Sport: Cycling
- Current team: St. Michel–Preference Home–Auber93
- Discipline: Road
- Role: Rider

Amateur teams
- 2009–2011: AS Marcoussis
- 2012–2015: VC Toucy
- 2016–2018: SCO Dijon

Professional teams
- 2019: Interpro Cycling Academy
- 2020–: St. Michel–Auber93

Adrien Guillonnet (born 21 November 1993) is a French cyclist, who currently rides for UCI Continental team St. Michel–Preference Home–Auber93.

== Major results ==
2018
4th Overall Tour Alsace

1st Mountains classification

5th Tour du Gévaudan Occitanie
2019
1st Overall Tour de Guadeloupe

1st Points classification
1st Stage 6

9th Overall Tour of Japan
