= Marchaux =

Commune in Doubs, France

- Part of Marchaux-Chaudefontaine
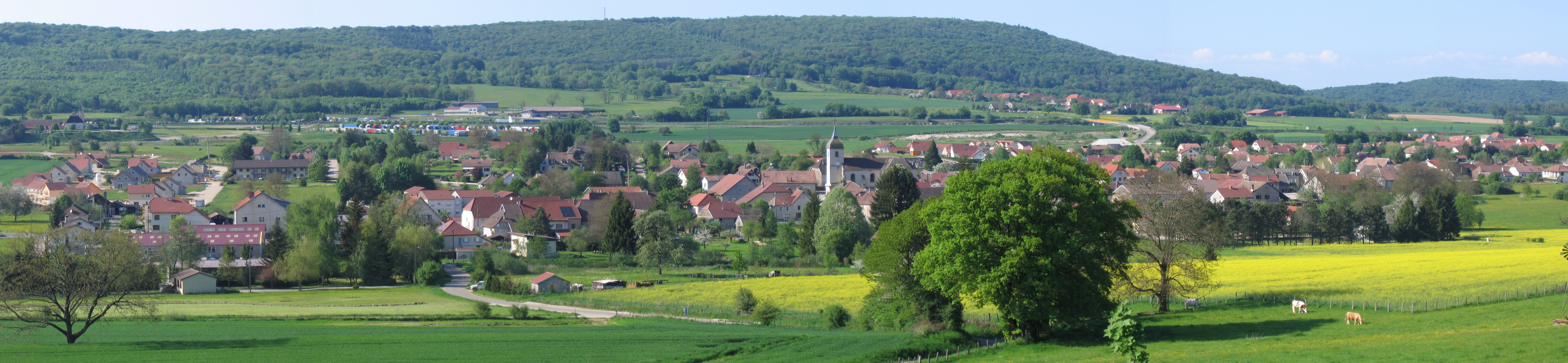
- Location of Marchaux
- Location within France Location within Bourgogne-Franche-Comté
- Coordinates: 47°19′27″N 6°08′01″E
- Country: France
- Region: Bourgogne-Franche-Comté
- Department: Doubs
- Arrondissement: Besançon
- Canton: Besançon-4
- Commune: Marchaux-Chaudefontaine
- Area^{1}: 10.06 km^{2} (3.88 sq mi)
- Highest elevation: 530 m (1,740 ft)
- Lowest elevation: 279 m (915 ft)
- Population (2015): 1,235
  - Density: 122.8/km^{2} (318.0/sq mi)
- Time zone: UTC+01:00 (CET)
  - Summer (DST): UTC+02:00 (CEST)
- Postal code: 25640
- ^{1} French Land Register data, which excludes lakes, ponds, glaciers > 1 km^{2} (0.386 sq mi or 247 acres) and river estuaries.

Marchaux (French pronunciation: [maʁʃo]) is a former commune in the Doubs department in the Bourgogne-Franche-Comté region in eastern France. On 1 January 2018, it was merged into the new commune of Marchaux-Chaudefontaine.

== Geography ==
Marchaux lies 10 km (6.2 mi) from Besançon at the edge of the forest of Chailluz.

It is 2 km (1.2 mi) from the exit from the A36 freeway.

== Population ==
Historical population
Year	Pop.	±% p.a.
1962	305	—
1968	379	+3.69%
1975	556	+5.63%
1982	688	+3.09%
1990	806	+2.00%
1999	937	+1.69%
2006	1,030	+1.36%
2015	1,235	+2.04%
Source: EHESS and INSEE

== See also ==
- Communes of the Doubs department
