= NiCe–Ethiopia Cycling Team =

Team information
- UCI code: NIC
- Registered: Ethiopia
- Founded: 2019
- Status: UCI Continental (2019–)

Team name history
- 2019–: NiCe–Ethiopia Cycling Team

NiCe–Ethiopia Cycling Team is a professional road bicycle racing team which participates in elite races. The team registered with the UCI for the 2019 season.

== Team roster ==
Rider	Date of birth
Negasi Haylu Abreha (ETH)	5 September 2000 (age 26)
Temesgen Mebrahtu Buru (ETH)	16 November 1994 (age 31)
Redwan Salih Ebrahim (ETH)	27 October 1997 (age 28)
Kiflom Gademaedhim Gebreselassie (ETH)	4 January 1999 (age 27)
Hailemelekot Hailu Abezgi (ETH)	11 July 1994 (age 32)
Cédric Jolidon (SUI)	10 April 1998 (age 28)
Nicola Jolidon (SUI)	20 May 2000 (age 26)
Bereket Desalegn Temalew (ETH)	5 September 2000 (age 26)
