= Georg Zimmermann =

German cyclist

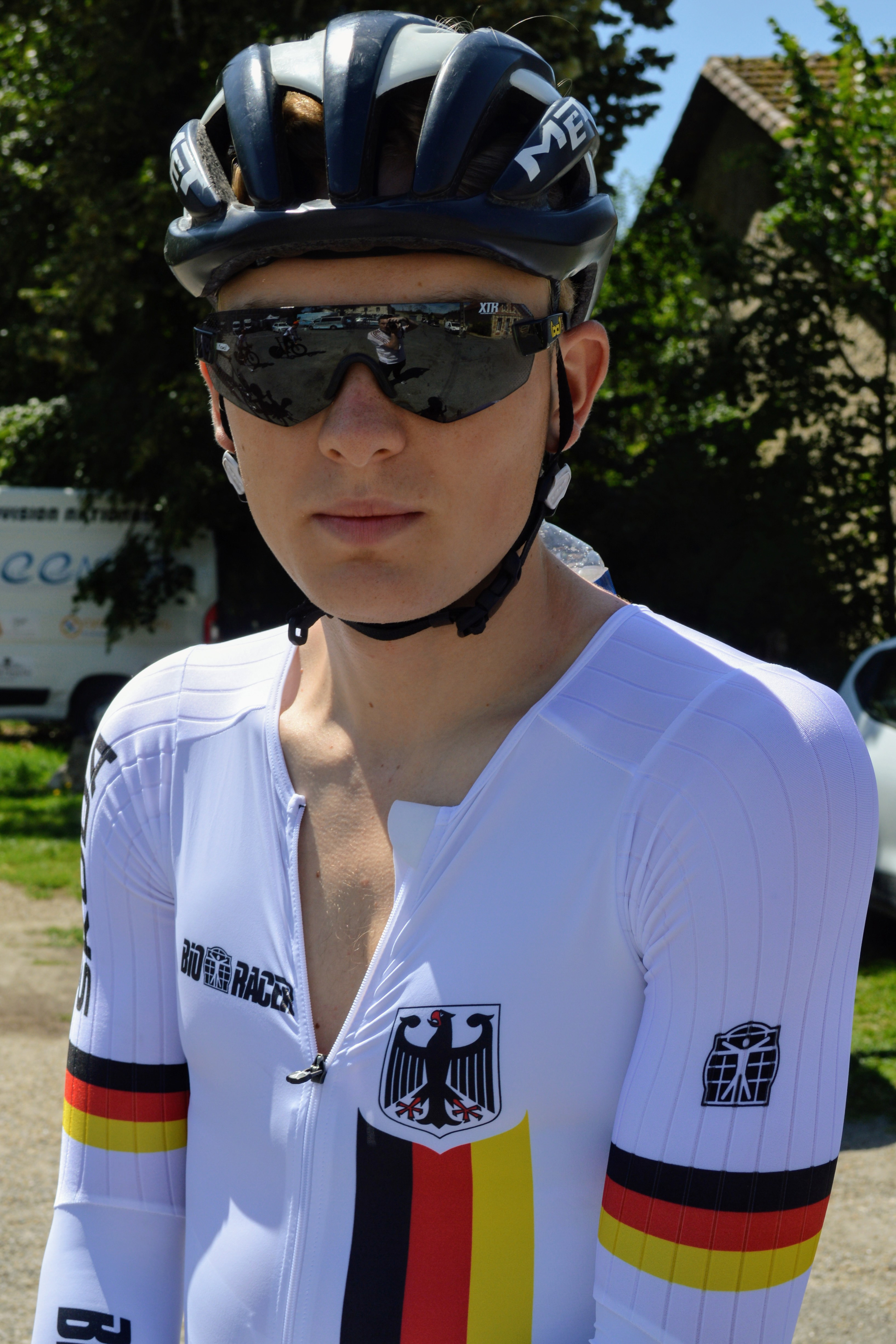

Personal information
- Born: 11 October 1997 (age 29) Augsburg, Germany
- Height: 1.81 m (5 ft 11 in)
- Weight: 70 kg (154 lb)

Cycling career
- Sport: Cycling
- Current team: Lotto–Intermarché
- Discipline: Road
- Role: Rider
- Rider type: Climber

Amateur team
- 2009–2015: E-Racers Top Level Augsburg

Professional teams
- 2016–2017: Team Felbermayr–Simplon Wels
- 2018–2019: Tirol Cycling Team
- 2019: CCC Team (stagiaire)
- 2020: CCC Team
- 2021–2025: Intermarché–Wanty–Gobert Matériaux
- 2026–: Lotto–Intermarché

Major wins
- One-day races and Classics National Road Race Championships (2025) Eschborn–Frankfurt (2026)

Georg Zimmermann (born 11 October 1997) is a German racing cyclist, who currently rides for UCI WorldTeam Lotto–Intermarché.

== Career ==
He rode for Tirol Cycling Team in the men's team time trial event at the 2018 UCI Road World Championships. In August 2019, Zimmermann joined UCI WorldTeam CCC Team as a stagiaire for the second half of the season, before joining the team permanently in 2020. In October 2020, he was named in the startlist for the 2020 Vuelta a España.

Ahead of the 2021 season, Zimmermann moved to Intermarché–Wanty–Gobert Matériaux team, who brought the license of his previous team.

== Major results ==
2015
2nd Road race, National Junior Road Championships
2nd Overall GP Général Patton

1st Points classification

6th Overall Oberösterreich Juniorenrundfahrt

1st Stage 1

10th Overall Giro della Lunigiana
2018
1st Stage 3 Giro della Friuli Venezia Giulia
3rd Raiffeisen Grand Prix
7th Giro del Belvedere
2019
1st Mountains classification, Tour of Austria
1st Trofeo Piva
1st Coppa della Pace
5th Road race, National Road Championships
5th Overall Tour de l'Avenir
8th Overall Tour of Antalya
2020
1st Mountains classification, Étoile de Bessèges
4th Road race, National Road Championships
2021 (1 pro win)
3rd Road race, National Road Championships
5th Overall Deutschland Tour

1st Young rider classification

7th Overall Tour de l'Ain

1st Stage 2

7th Trofeo Serra de Tramuntana
8th Trofeo Andratx–Mirador d’Es Colomer
2022
3rd Giro dell'Appennino
4th Overall Deutschland Tour

1st Young rider classification

5th Grand Prix of Aargau Canton
7th Grand Prix La Marseillaise
2023 (1)
1st Stage 6 Critérium du Dauphiné
5th Japan Cup
6th Gran Piemonte
7th Eschborn–Frankfurt
7th La Drôme Classic
7th Memorial Marco Pantani
7th Circuit Franco-Belge
8th Clásica Jaén Paraíso Interior
10th Trofeo Laigueglia
10th Giro della Toscana
2024
3rd Cadel Evans Great Ocean Road Race
9th Veneto Classic
2025 (2)
1st Road race, National Road Championships
1st Overall Giro d'Abruzzo
2026 (1)
1st Eschborn–Frankfurt

=== Grand Tour general classification results timeline ===
Grand Tour	2020	2021	2022	2023	2024	2025
Giro d'Italia	—	—	—	—	—	—
Tour de France	—	80	44	47	77	DNF
Vuelta a España	21	—	—	—	—	—

Legend
—	Did not compete
DNF	Did not finish
