= Alessandro Fedeli =

Italian cyclist

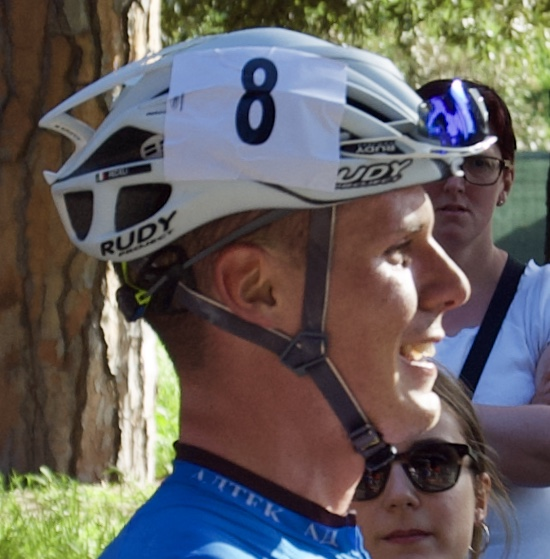
- Fedeli in 2018.

Personal information
- Full name: Alessandro Fedeli
- Born: 2 March 1996 (age 30) Negrar, Italy
- Height: 1.76 m (5 ft 9 in)
- Weight: 65 kg (143 lb)

Cycling career
- Sport: Cycling
- Current team: Retired
- Discipline: Road
- Role: Rider

Amateur teams
- 2015–2016: General Store Bottoli Zardini
- 2016: Unieuro–Wilier (stagiaire)
- 2017: Team Colpack

Professional teams
- 2018: Trevigiani Phonix–Hemus 1896
- 2018: Delko–Marseille Provence KTM (stagiaire)
- 2019–2021: Delko–Marseille Provence
- 2022: Gazprom–RusVelo
- 2022: Eolo–Kometa
- 2023: Q36.5 Pro Cycling Team

Alessandro Fedeli (born 2 March 1996) is an Italian former cyclist, who competed as a professional from 2018 to 2023.

== Major results ==
2017
1st Stage 4 Giro della Valle d'Aosta
7th Trofeo Piva
7th Toscana Terra di Ciclismo Eroica
8th Gran Premio della Liberazione
2018
1st Trofeo Edil C
1st Gran Premio della Liberazione
1st Stage 3 Giro della Valle d'Aosta
5th GP Capodarco
7th G.P. Palio del Recioto
7th Giro del Medio Brenta
8th Gran Premio Industrie del Marmo
2019
1st Stage 6 CRO Race
1st Stage 1 Tour of Rwanda
2020
1st Stage 4 Tour du Limousin
5th Bretagne Classic
8th Memorial Marco Pantani
2022
2nd Overall Tour of Antalya
2nd GP Industria & Artigianato
4th Per sempre Alfredo
2023
3rd Eschborn–Frankfurt
7th Grand Prix du Morbihan
