= Interpro Cycling Academy =

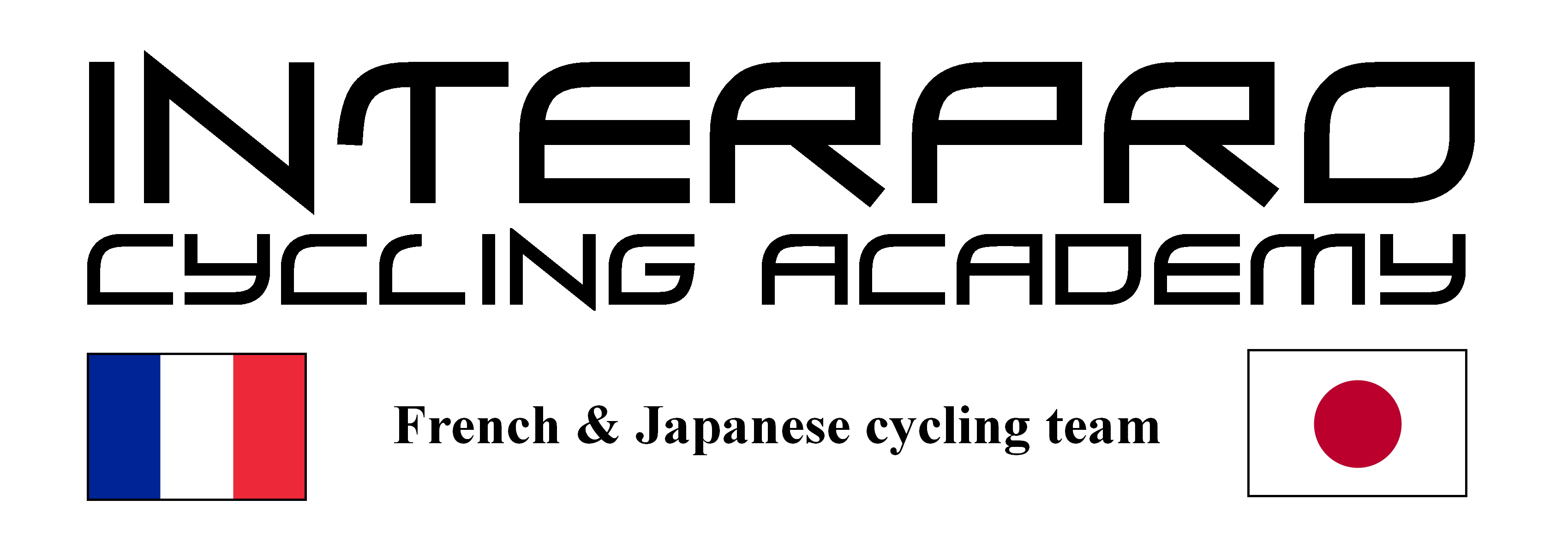

Team information
- UCI code: IPC
- Registered: Japan
- Founded: 2017
- Discipline: Road
- Status: UCI Continental (2017–2019)
- Bicycles: Lapierre
- Components: Shimano
- Website: Team home page

Key personnel
- General manager: Sebastien Pilotte
- Team manager: Damien Garcia

Team name history
- 2017 2018 2019: Interpro Cycling Academy; Interpro Stradalli Cycling; Interpro Cycling Academy

Interpro Cycling Academy is a Japanese UCI Continental cycling team founded in 2017.

By the end of 2019 season, the team was merged to Hincapie–Leomo p/b BMC.

== Major results ==
2018
Stage 4 Tour du Maroc, Alexey Vermeulen
2019
Stage 2 Tour de Tochigi, Maris Bogdanovics
Stage 7 Tour of Japan, Pablo Torres
Stage 4 Tour of Qinghai Lake, Hernán Aguirre
Overall Tour Cycliste International de la Guadeloupe, Adrien Guillonnet

Stage 6, Adrien Guillonnet

== Team roster ==
Rider	Date of birth
Hernán Aguirre (COL)	13 December 1995 (age 30)
Maris Bogdanovics (LAT)	19 November 1991 (age 34)
David Casanovas (ESP)	1 April 1994 (age 32)
Charles-Étienne Chrétien (CAN)	19 June 1999 (age 27)
Evan Clouse (USA)	6 November 1999 (age 26)
Adrien Guillonnet (FRA)	21 November 1993 (age 32)
Florian Hudry (FRA)	6 November 1994 (age 31)
Yuki Ishihara (JPN)	5 April 1997 (age 29)

Rider	Date of birth
Simon Jones (USA)	24 August 1997 (age 29)
Tomoya Koyama (JPN)	18 July 1998 (age 28)
Kyohei Mizuno (JPN)	23 October 1988 (age 37)
Gauthier Navarro (FRA)	11 March 2000 (age 26)
Samuel Ponce (AND)	28 November 1991 (age 34)
Aleksejs Saramotins (LAT)	8 April 1982 (age 44)
Kouki Shinoda (JPN)	11 March 1999 (age 27)
Pablo Torres (ESP)	27 November 1987 (age 38)
