= Yakob Debesay =

Eritrean cyclist

Personal information
- Full name: Yakob Debesay
- Born: 28 June 1999 (age 27) Asmara, Eritrea
- Height: 1.77 m (5 ft 10 in)
- Weight: 63 kg (139 lb)

Cycling career
- Sport: Cycling
- Discipline: Road
- Role: Rider

Amateur teams
- 2019: Eritel
- 2019: Équipe Continentale Groupama–FDJ (stagiaire)

Professional teams
- 2020: Équipe Continentale Groupama–FDJ
- 2021: Delko

Yakob Debesay (born 28 June 1999) is a former Eritrean road cyclist, who last rode for UCI ProTeam Delko.

== Personal life ==
Debesay comes from a cycling family; his brothers Ferekalsi Debesay and Mekseb Debesay, as well as his sister Mossana Debesai are also cyclists.

== Major results ==
2017
1st Time trial, National Junior Road Championships
2018
4th Overall Tour of Fuzhou
2019 (1 pro win)
1st Overall Tour de l'Espoir

1st Stages 1 (TTT) & 3

7th Overall Tour du Rwanda

1st Mountains classification
1st Young rider classification
1st Stage 7

2020
3rd Piccolo Giro di Lombardia
