= Guachucal =

Coordinates: 0°58′N 77°44′W

- Municipality and town
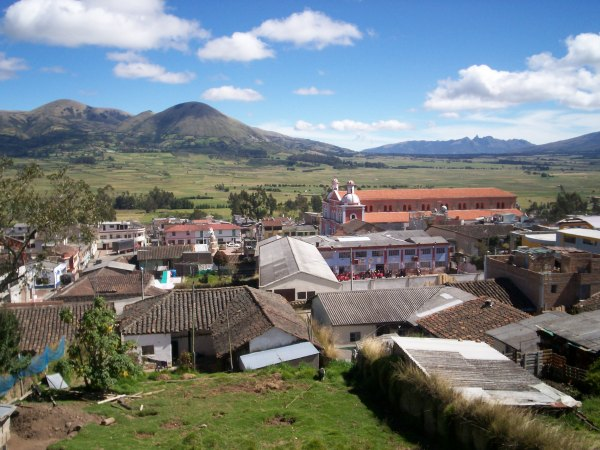

- Flag Coat of arms

- Location of the municipality and town of Guachucal in the Nariño Department of Colombia.
- Country: Colombia
- Department: Nariño Department

Area
  - Total: 159 km^{2} (61 sq mi)

Population (Census 2018)
  - Total: 18,845
  - Density: 119/km^{2} (307/sq mi)
- Time zone: UTC-5 (Colombia Standard Time)

Guachucal is a town and municipality in the Nariño Department, Colombia.

== See also ==
- List of highest towns by country
