= Jérémy Bellicaud =

French cyclist (born 1998)

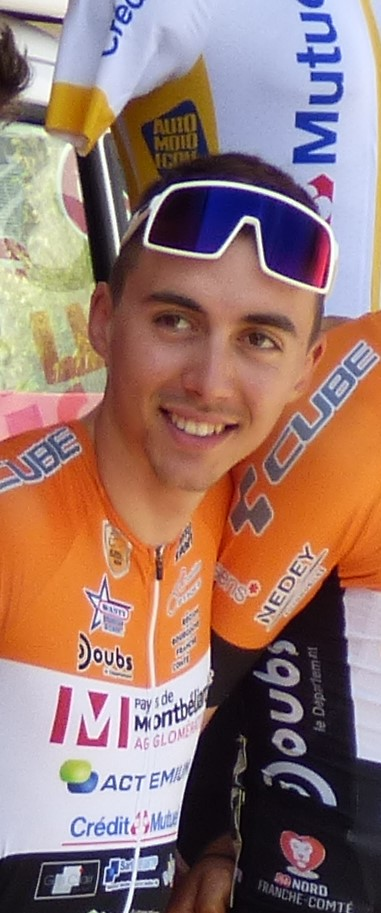
- Bellicaud in 2019

Personal information
- Full name: Jérémy Bellicaud
- Born: 8 June 1998 (age 28) Jonzac, France

Cycling career
- Sport: Cycling
- Current team: Océane Top 16
- Discipline: Road
- Role: Rider

Amateur teams
- 2017–2018: Océane Top 16
- 2019: CC Étupes
- 2022–: Océane Top 16

Professional team
- 2020–2021: Circus–Wanty Gobert

Jérémy Bellicaud (born 6 June 1998) is a French cyclist, who currently rides for French amateur team Océane Top 16.

== Major results ==
2019
3rd Overall Tour de Savoie Mont Blanc

1st Young rider classification

2021
9th Trofeo Andratx – Mirador d’Es Colomer
