= Tour de l'Espoir =

Stage cycling race held in Cameroon

Race details
- Date: February
- Discipline: Road
- Competition: UCI Africa Tour 2.Ncup
- Type: Stage race
- Organiser: Vivendi Sports
- Web site: tourdelespoir.cm

History
- First edition: 2018
- Editions: 2 (as of 2019)
- First winner: Joseph Areruya (RWA)
- Most wins: No repeat winners
- Most recent: Yakob Debesay (ERI)

The Tour de l'Espoir is a stage cycling race held annually in Cameroon. It is part of the UCI Under 23 Nations' Cup.

== Winners ==
Year	Country	Rider	Team
2018	Rwanda	Joseph Areruya	Dimension Data for Qhubeka
2019	Eritrea	Yakob Debesay	Eritrea national team
