= Q36.5 Continental Team =

Cycling team

Team information
- UCI code: DDC (2016–2019); NPC (2020); T4Q (2021–2022); Q3C (2023–)
- Registered: South Africa (2016–2017); Italy (2018–)
- Founded: 2016
- Discipline: Road
- Status: UCI Continental (2016–)
- Website: Team home page

Key personnel
- General manager: Kevin Campbell
- Team manager: Daniele Nieri

Team name history
- 2016–2019 2020 2021–2022 2023–: Dimension Data for Qhubeka; NTT Continental Cycling Team; Team Qhubeka; Q36.5 Continental Team

Q36.5 Continental Team is a UCI Continental cycling team, initially registered in South Africa but now registered in Italy. Until 2021 the team acted as a feeder team to the UCI WorldTeam, Team Qhubeka NextHash. Since 2023, it acts as the development team for UCI ProTeam Pinarello–Q36.5 Pro Cycling Team.

== Team roster ==
As of 27 February 2021.

| Rider | Date of birth |
|---|---|
| Negasi Abreha (ETH) | 9 May 2000 (age 26) |
| Kevin Bonaldo (ITA) | 9 August 2000 |
| Drew Christensen (NZL) | 21 August 2001 (age 25) |
| Luca Coati (ITA) | 30 November 1999 (age 26) |
| Mattia Guasco (ITA) | 30 June 2000 (age 26) |

| Rider | Date of birth |
|---|---|
| Henok Mulubrhan (ERI) | 11 November 1999 (age 26) |
| Marc Pritzen (RSA) | 11 August 1999 (age 27) |
| Antonio Puppio (ITA) | 28 April 1999 (age 27) |
| Renus Uhiriwe (RWA) | 1 April 2001 (age 25) |
| Ghebrehiwet Yohannes (ERI) | 6 January 2001 (age 25) |

== Major wins ==
2016
South Africa U23 National Road Race Championship, Stefan de Bod
South Africa U23 National Time Trial Championship, Stefan de Bod
Rwanda National Road Race Championship, Bonaventure Uwizeyimana
Overall Tour of Rwanda, Valens Ndayisenga

Stages 2 & 6, Valens Ndayisenga
Stage 5, Metkel Eyob

2017
South Africa U23 National Road Race Championship, Stefan de Bod
South Africa U23 National Time Trial Championship, Stefan de Bod
Stage 5a Girobio, Joseph Areruya
Overall Tour of Rwanda, Joseph Areruya

Stages 1 & 3, Joseph Areruya
Stages 4 & 6, Metkel Eyob

2018
Overall Coupe des Nations de l'Espoir Blue Line, Joseph Areruya

Stage 3, Samuel Mugisha

South Africa U23 National Road Race Championship, Stefan de Bod
Gran Premio Palio del Recioto, Stefan de Bod
Coppa della Pace, Matteo Sobrero
Stage 2 Tour of Rwanda, Samuel Mugisha
2019
Giro del Belvedere, Samuele Battistella
G.P. Palio del Recioto - Trofeo C&F Resinatura Blocchi, Matteo Sobrero
Circuito del Porto - Trofeo Arvedi, Luca Mozzato
Overall Tour de Limpopo, Samuele Battistella

Stage 2, Connor Brown
Stage 3, Samuele Battistella

Italy U23 National Time Trial Championship, Matteo Sobrero
2021
South Africa U23 National Time Trial Championship, Marc Pritzen
South Africa National Road Race Championship, Marc Pritzen

== National champions ==
2016
South African U23 Road Race, Stefan de Bod
South African U23 Time Trial, Stefan de Bod
Rwanda Road Race, Bonaventure Uwizeyimana
2017
South African U23 Road Race, Stefan de Bod
South African U23 Time Trial, Stefan de Bod
2018
South African U23 Road Race, Stefan de Bod
2019
Italy U23 Time Trial, Matteo Sobrero
2021
South African U23 Time Trial, Marc Pritzen
South African Road Race, Marc Pritzen
