= Tour du Rwanda =

Rwandan multi-day road cycling race

Race details
- Date: February-March
- Region: Rwanda
- Discipline: Road
- Competition: UCI Africa Tour
- Type: 2.1
- Organiser: Rwanda Cycling Federation
- Web site: www.tourdurwanda.rw

History
- First edition: 1988; 38 years ago
- Editions: 29 (as of 2026)
- First winner: Célestin Ndengeyingoma (RWA)
- Most wins: Abraham Ruhumuriza (RWA) (5 wins)
- Most recent: Moritz Kretschy (GER)

The Tour du Rwanda is a cycling race started in 1988 and based in Rwanda. Until 2008, Tour du Rwanda was a regional cycling race that brought together Rwandans but also riders from neighboring Burundi, Tanzania, Uganda. The race is a cycling stage race that is organized by the Rwanda Cycling Federation (FERWACY). The event has been part of the UCI Africa Tour as a category 2.1-rated event since 2009.

== Winners ==
Year	Country	Rider	Team
1988	Rwanda	Célestin N'Dengeyingoma	
1989	Rwanda	Omar Masumbuko	
1990	Rwanda	Faustin M'Parabanyi	
1991– 2000	No race		
2001	Rwanda	Bernard N'Sengiyumva	
2002	Rwanda	Abraham Ruhumuriza	
2003	Rwanda	Abraham Ruhumuriza	
2004	Rwanda	Abraham Ruhumuriza	
2005	Rwanda	Abraham Ruhumuriza	
2006	Kenya	Peter Kamau	
2007	Rwanda	Abraham Ruhumuriza	
2008	Rwanda	Adrien Niyonshuti	
2009	Morocco	Adil Jelloul	Morocco national team
2010	Eritrea	Daniel Teklehaimanot	Eritrea national team
2011	United States	Kiel Reijnen	Team Type 1–Sanofi
2012	South Africa	Darren Lill	South Africa national team
2013	South Africa	Dylan Girdlestone	South Africa national team
2014	Rwanda	Valens Ndayisenga	Rwanda Karisimbi
2015	Rwanda	Jean Bosco Nsengimana	Rwanda Karisimbi
2016	Rwanda	Valens Ndayisenga	Dimension Data for Qhubeka
2017	Rwanda	Joseph Areruya	Dimension Data for Qhubeka
2018	Rwanda	Samuel Mugisha	Dimension Data for Qhubeka
2019	Eritrea	Merhawi Kudus	Astana
2020	Eritrea	Natnael Tesfatsion	Eritrea
2021	Spain	Cristián Rodríguez	Total Direct Énergie
2022	Eritrea	Natnael Tesfatsion	Drone Hopper–Androni Giocattoli
2023	Eritrea	Henok Mulubrhan	Green Project–Bardiani–CSF–Faizanè
2024	Great Britain	Joseph Blackmore	Israel–Premier Tech
2025	France	Fabien Doubey	Team TotalEnergies
2026	Germany	Moritz Kretschy	NSN Development Team

== Controversies ==
Despite security concerns due to the ongoing conflict near Rwanda's borders with the Democratic Republic of Congo, participants in the 2025 Tour du Rwanda reported feeling safe. The race passed close to Goma and Bukavu, cities captured by the M23 rebel group. While Belgian team Soudal Quick-Step withdrew due to these concerns, riders like South African Ryco Schutte and Belgian Kamiel Eeman expressed no fear during the event. The UCI and Rwandan officials assured that the country was safe for tourism and business, with strong security measures in place. However, Rwanda has faced accusations of "sportswashing," with critics alleging that the government uses sports to distract from its human rights record. These accusations were denied by Rwandan officials. Despite these controversies, the Tour du Rwanda proceeded without incidents, and the 2025 UCI Road World Championships hosted in Kigali criticed the criticers.
