= Delko =

French cycling team

Team information
- UCI code: DKO
- Registered: France (1974–2010; 2012–2021); Latvia (2011)
- Founded: 1974
- Disbanded: 2021
- Discipline: Road
- Status: National (1974–2010); UCI Continental (2011–2015); UCI Professional Continental (2016–2019); UCI ProTeam (2020–2021)
- Bicycles: Look
- Website: Team home page

Team name history
- 1974–1999 2000–2011 2012–2014 2015 2016–2018 2019 2020 2021: VC La Pomme; VC La Pomme Marseille; La Pomme Marseille; Marseille 13–KTM; Delko–Marseille Provence KTM; Delko–Marseille Provence; Nippo–Delko–One Provence; Delko
Delko jersey
Jersey

Delko (UCI team code: DKO) was a French UCI ProTeam that was founded in 1974. They became a Continental team in 2011 allowing them to ride UCI Europe Tour races. After financial difficulties, the team's operations were brought to a halt shortly before the end of the 2021 season.

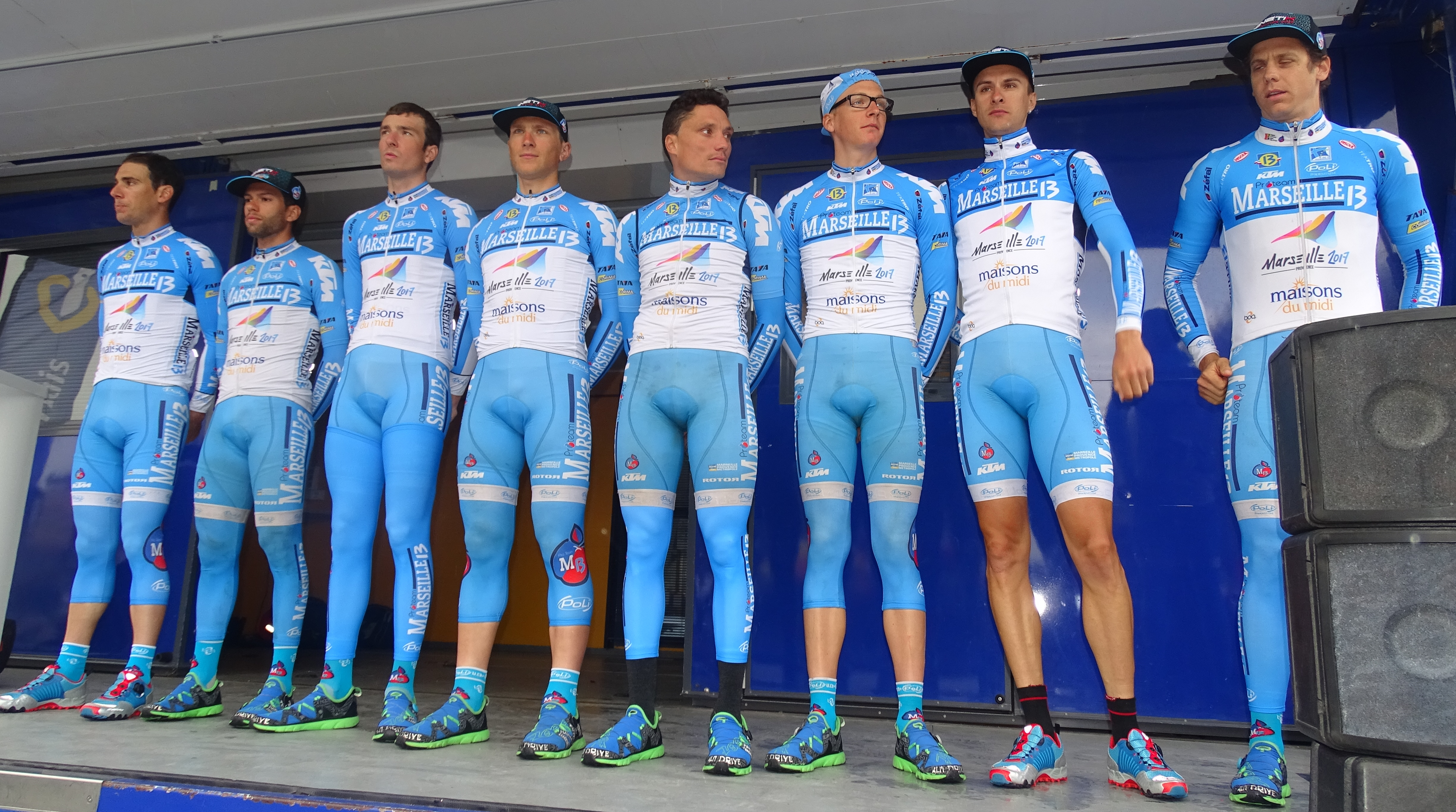
The team in 2015

== Doping ==
In April 2018, news broke that Rémy Di Gregorio had failed an in-competition doping test for darbepoetin (EPO) during the 2018 edition of Paris–Nice.

== Team roster ==
As of 5 January 2021.

Rider	Date of birth
Pierre Barbier (FRA)	25 September 1997 (age 28)
Clément Berthet (FRA)	2 August 1997 (age 29)
Clément Carisey (FRA)	23 March 1992 (age 34)
Lucas De Rossi (FRA)	16 August 1995 (age 31)
Yakob Debesay (ERI)	28 June 1999 (age 27)
Alexandre Delettre (FRA)	25 October 1997 (age 28)
José Manuel Díaz (ESP)	18 January 1995 (age 31)
Alessandro Fedeli (ITA)	2 March 1996 (age 30)
Delio Fernández (ESP)	17 February 1986 (age 40)
Mauro Finetto (ITA)	10 May 1985 (age 41)
Biniam Girmay (ERI)	2 April 2000 (age 26)
José Gonçalves (POR)	13 February 1989 (age 37)

Rider	Date of birth
Eduard-Michael Grosu (ROU)	4 September 1992 (age 34)
Mulu Hailemichael (ETH)	12 January 1999 (age 27)
Masahiro Ishigami (JPN)	20 October 1997 (age 28)
August Jensen (NOR)	29 August 1991 (age 35)
Justin Jules (FRA)	20 September 1986 (age 39)
Mathias Le Turnier (FRA)	14 March 1995 (age 31)
Atsushi Oka (JPN)	3 September 1995 (age 31)
Eduard Prades (ESP)	9 August 1987 (age 39)
Dušan Rajović (SRB)	19 November 1997 (age 28)
Evaldas Šiškevičius (LTU)	30 December 1988 (age 37)
Julien Trarieux (FRA)	19 August 1992 (age 34)

== National champions ==
2013
France U23 Time Trial, Yoann Paillot
2018
Rwanda Time Trial, Joseph Areruya
Bulgaria Road Race, Nikolay Mihaylov
2019
Australia Criterium, Brenton Jones
Rwanda Time Trial, Joseph Areruya
Lithuania Road Race, Ramūnas Navardauskas
2020
Lithuania Time Trial, Evaldas Šiškevičius
2021
Lithuania Time Trial, Evaldas Šiškevičius
Serbia Road Race Dušan Rajović
