= List of flag bearers for Rwanda at the Olympics =

Rwanda at the Olympics
- IOC code: RWA
- NOC: Comité National Olympique et Sportif du Rwanda
- Website: olympicrwanda.org
- Medals: Gold 0 Silver 0 Bronze 0 Total 0

Summer appearances
- 1984; 1988; 1992; 1996; 2000; 2004; 2008; 2012; 2016; 2020; 2024

This is a list of flag bearers who have represented Rwanda at the Olympics.

Flag bearers carry the national flag of their country at the opening ceremony of the Olympic Games.

#	Event year	Season	Flag bearer	Sport
1	1984	Summer	Emmanuel Twagirayezu	Official
2	1988	Summer	Mathias Ntawulikura	Athletics
3	1992	Summer		
4	1996	Summer	Parfait Ntukamyagwe	Athletics (did not compete)
5	2000	Summer	Pierre Karemera	Official
6	2004	Summer	Mathias Ntawulikura	Athletics
7	2008	Summer	Pamela Girimbabazi Rugabira	Swimming
8	2012	Summer	Adrien Niyonshuti	Cycling
9	2016	Summer	Adrien Niyonshuti	Cycling
10	2020	Summer	Alphonsine Agahozo	Swimming
10	2020	Summer	John Hakizimana	Athletics
11	2024	Summer	Eric Manizabayo	Cycling
11	2024	Summer	Clementine Mukandanga	Athletics

== See also ==
- Rwanda at the Olympics
