= Rwanda at the 2012 Summer Olympics =

- IOC code: RWA
- NOC: Comité National Olympique et Sportif du Rwanda

in London
- Competitors: 7 in 4 sports
- Flag bearer: Adrien Niyonshuti
- Medals: Gold 0 Silver 0 Bronze 0 Total 0

Summer Olympics appearances (overview)
- 1984; 1988; 1992; 1996; 2000; 2004; 2008; 2012; 2016; 2020; 2024

Rwanda competed at the 2012 Summer Olympics in London, which was held from 27 July to 12 August 2012. The country's participation at London marked its eighth appearance in the Summer Olympics since its début at the 1984 Summer Olympics. The delegation included seven competitors which included three track and field athletes; Robert Kajuga, Jean Pierre Mvuyekure and Claudette Mukasakindi. The other people that represented the country were cross-country cyclist Adrien Niyonshuti, judoka Fred Yannick Uwase, swimmers Jackson Niyomugabo and Alphonsine Agahozo. The track and field athletes qualified for the Games by meeting qualification standards while the remaining four made the Olympics through wildcard places. Niyonshuti was the flag bearer for both the opening and closing ceremonies. No athletes were able to achieve medals at the London Olympic Games.

== Background ==
Rwanda participated in eight Summer Olympic Games between its début at the 1984 Summer Olympics in Los Angeles, United States and the 2012 Summer Olympics in London, England. The highest number of athletes sent by Rwanda to a summer Games was ten to the 1992 Olympics. No Rwandan athlete has ever won a medal at the Olympic Games and the country has yet to debut at the Winter Olympic Games. Rwanda participated in the London Summer Olympics from 27 July to 12 August 2012.

The nation's delegation to London consisted of athletes Robert Kajuga, Jean Pierre Mvuyekure, Jean Pierre Mvuyekure, cyclist Adrien Niyonshuti, judoka Fred Yannick Uwase, and swimmers Jackson Niyomugabo and Alphonsine Agahozo. Long-distance runner Épiphanie Nyirabaramé was unable to qualify after being unable to meet the required qualification standards. The delegation included chef de mission Serge Mwambali, NOC president Charles Rudakubana and secretary-general Parfait Busabizwa. Niyonshuti was the flag bearer for both the opening and closing ceremonies.

The team trained at Bury St Edmunds Leisure Centre's track and swimming facilities for a two-week period in a deal which was announced in October 2009. The athletes were coached by Justin Guillemin, Nicholas Dusine and Innocent Rwabuhihi. Rudakubana said that Rwanda's goal was to win medals.

== Athletics ==
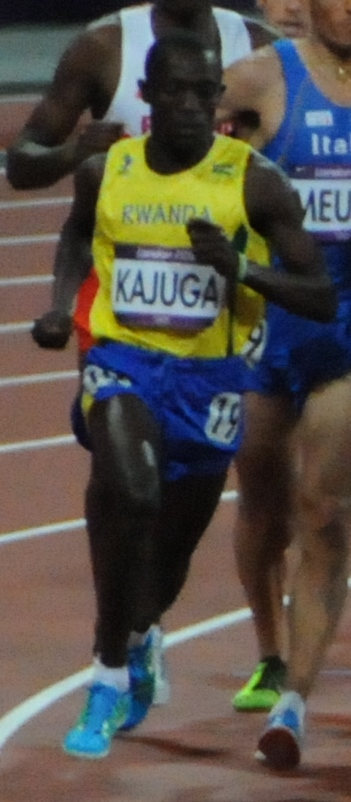
Robert Kajuga finished 14th in the men's 10,000 metres

Robert Kajuga was one of the two oldest male athletes to represent Rwanda at the London Olympics, at 27 years old. He had not taken part in any previous Olympic Games. Kajuga qualified for the Games via qualification standards because his fastest time of 28 minutes and three seconds, set at the 2012 African Championships in Athletics which placed him fifth, was two seconds faster than the "B" qualifying standard for the men's 10,000 metres. He was the second Rwandan track and field athlete to attain qualification. He competed in the event, held on 4 August, finishing 14th out of 26 athletes overall, (Note: Three athletes were unable to finish the race.) with a time of 27 minutes, 56.67 seconds. Kajuga reset his personal best but was 35 seconds slower than the Rwandan national record. Post-race, Kajuga said he was "really happy" with his performances and described his Olympic Games as a "good experience".

The 2012 Summer Games marked Jean Pierre Mvuyekure's Olympic début. He qualified for the Games because his fastest time of 2 hours, 17 minutes and 32 seconds, set at the 2012 Rome Marathon, was 28 seconds faster than the "B" qualifying standard for the men's marathon. In an interview before the race Mvuyekure stated that he was "really ready" to participate and hoped to run to the best of his ability. After heavy rain fell in London before the marathon he said that it could impede some runners but did not want to use the weather as an excuse. He competed in the 12 August event, finishing 79th out of 85 runners, (Note: Twenty athletes did not finish.) with a time of 2 hours, 51 minutes, 7 seconds.

Claudette Mukasakindi was the oldest athlete to represent Rwanda at the London Games at the age of 29. She had not participated in any previous Olympic Games. Mukasakindi attained qualification into the Games because her fastest time of two hours, 40 minutes and 18 minutes, set at the 2012 Cagliari Marathon, was two minutes and 42 seconds faster than the "B" qualifying standard for the women's marathon. She was initially denied entry into the Games because the world athletics governing body, the International Association of Athletics Federations, did not recognise the Cagliari Marathon as an eligible event for qualification. Injuries and poor performances from other athletes allowed her to enter the Olympics. Mukasakindi participated in the marathon, held on 5 August, finishing 101st out of 107 competitors, (Note: Eleven competitors did not finish.) with a time of two hours, 51 minutes and seven seconds.

Key

- Note–Ranks given for track events are within the athlete's heat only
- Bye = Athlete not required to compete in round

Men

Athlete	Event	Final	
Athlete	Event	Result	Rank
Robert Kajuga	10000 m	27:56.67	14
Jean Pierre Mvuyekure	Marathon	2:30:19	79

Women

Athlete	Event	Final	
Athlete	Event	Result	Rank
Claudette Mukasakindi	Marathon	2:51:07	101

== Cycling ==
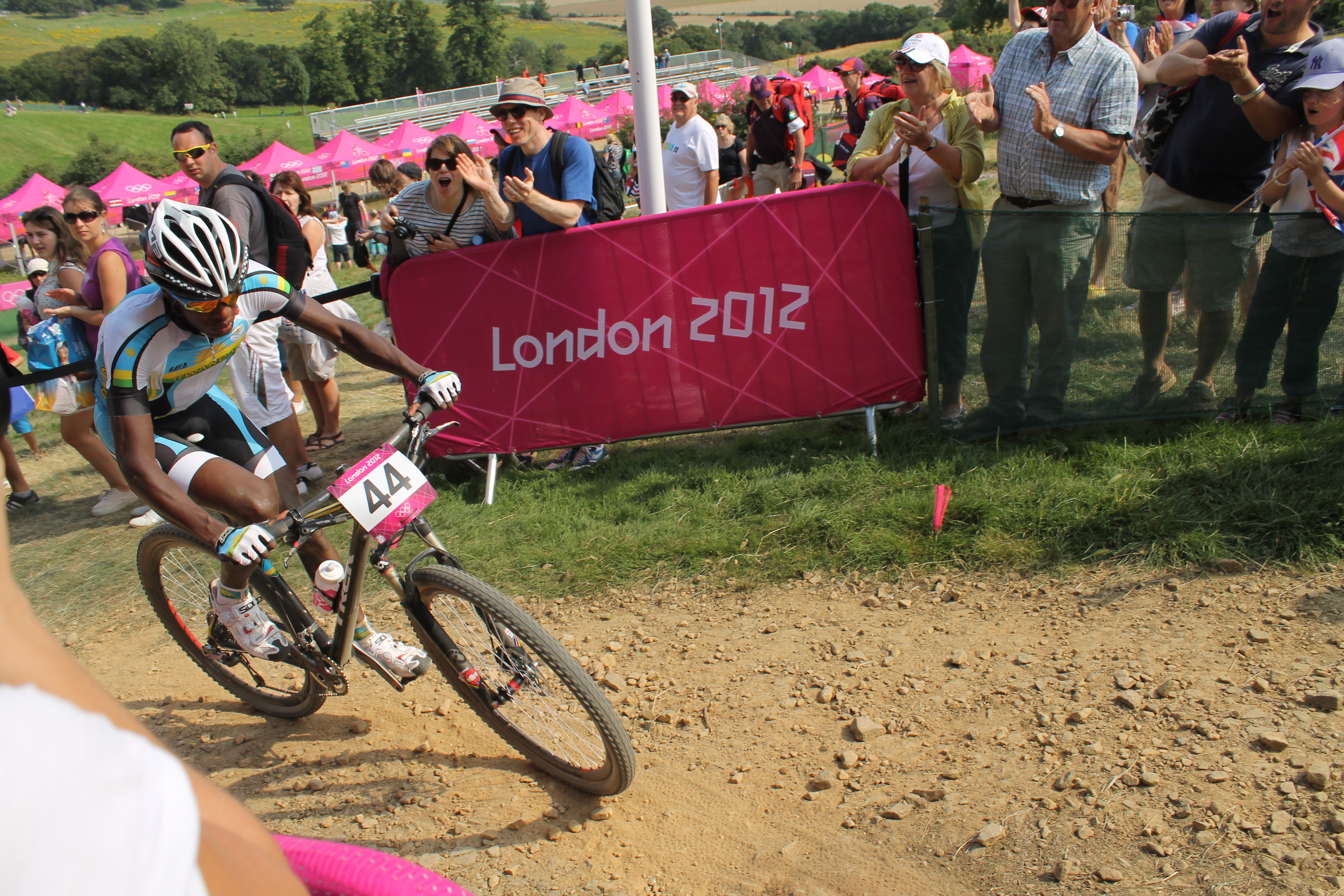
Adrien Niyonshuti finished 39th in the men's cross-country cycling race.

Adrien Niyonshuti, who at the age of 25 was taking part in his first Olympic Games, was Rwanda's sole representative in the men's cross-country cycling event, and was notable for carrying his nation's flag at the opening and closing ceremonies. He qualified for the Games based on his performance at the 2011 African Continental Mountain Bike Championship. Niyonshuti said that he was putting his focus towards the event and wanted to impress his family, "To have everyone say they are behind me makes me feel good. When people congratulate me for getting to the Olympics, it gives me a confidence and it tells me that yeah, I did well. I just want to go there and compete and finish the race. To know that so many people are behind me makes me not want to disappoint them." He took part in the 12 August race, finishing 39th out of 40 cyclists, (Note: Two cyclists were lapped, five did not finish and three did not start.) with a time of one hour, 42 minutes and 46 seconds.

=== Mountain biking ===
Athlete	Event	Time	Rank
Adrien Niyonshuti	Men's cross-country	1:42:46	39

== Judo ==
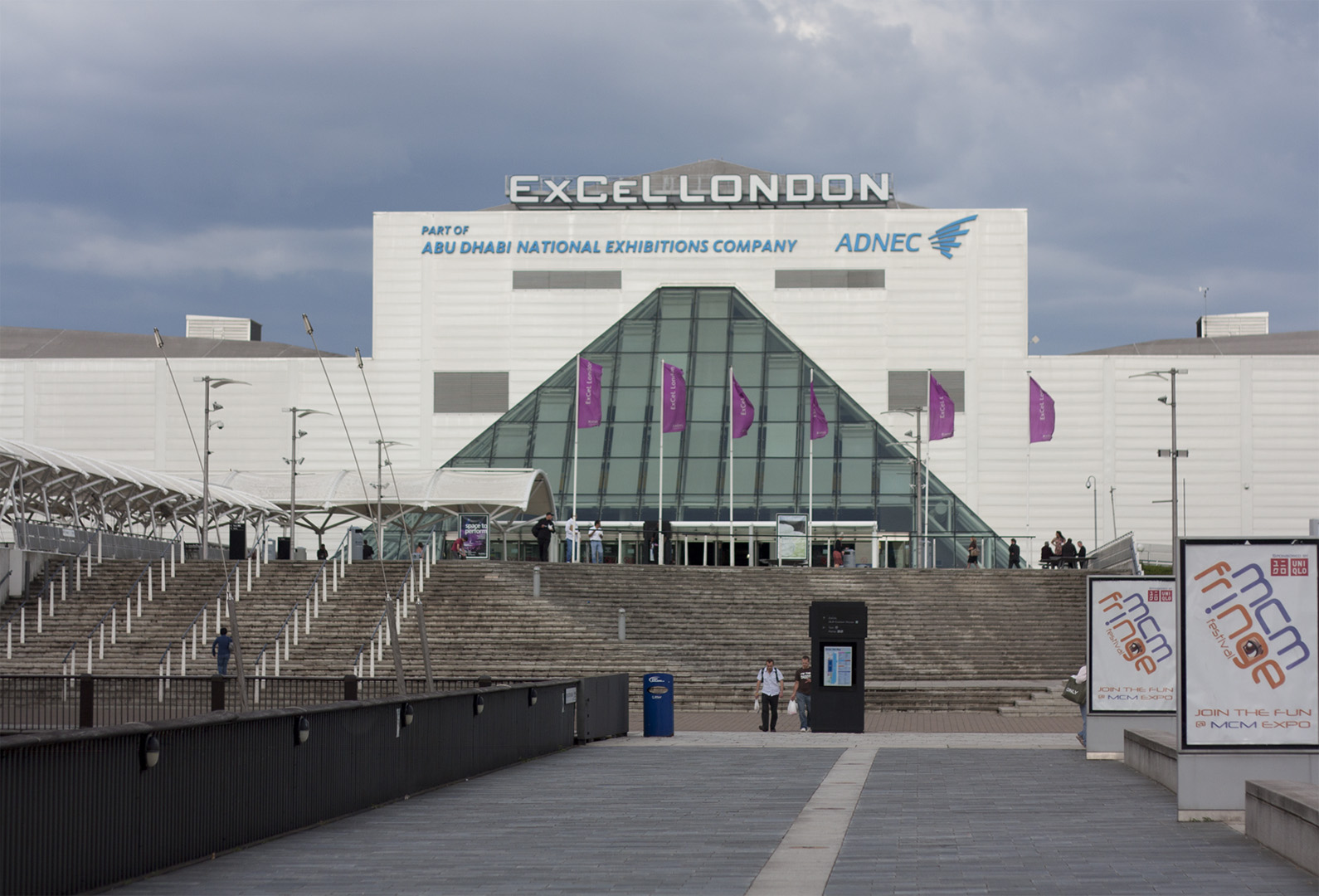
ExCeL London, where Uwase participated in the men's judo competition.

At the time of the Games, Fred Yannick Uwase was the youngest male competitor representing Rwanda at the age of 18. He was the country's sole representative in Judo and had not taken part in any previous Olympic Games. Uwase was issued with a wildcard by the Tripartite Commission to compete in the Games after being defeated in the third round of the 2012 African Judo Championships by Mazou Abaker Mbairo. He became the first Rwandan judoka to qualify for the Olympic Games. Uwase received a bye in the first round of the men's 73 kilograms contest and faced Brazilian athlete Bruno Mendonça on 30 July. He was defeated by his opponent in a 53-second match and thus was unable to advance to the third round of the competition.

Athlete	Event	Round of 64	Round of 32	Round of 16	Quarterfinals	Semifinals	Repechage	Final / BM	
Athlete	Event	Opposition Result	Opposition Result	Opposition Result	Opposition Result	Opposition Result	Opposition Result	Opposition Result	Rank
Fred Yannick Uwase	Men's −73 kg	Bye	Mendonça (BRA); L 0000–0100	Did not advance					

== Swimming ==
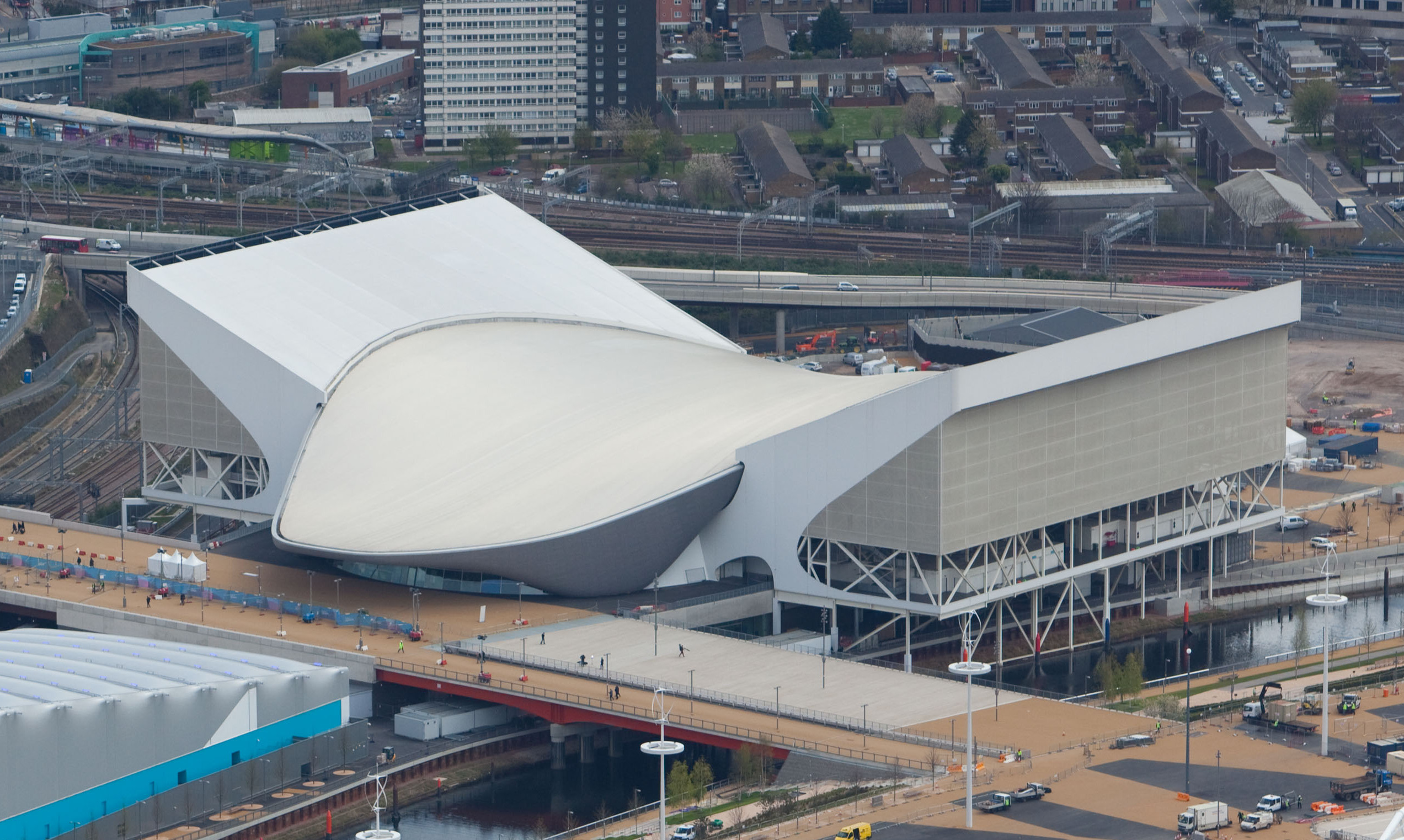
The London Aquatics Centre where Niyomugabo and Agahozo competed in swimming events.

Jackson Niyomugao, at the age of 24, was the only Rwandian competitor in the London Games to have participated in the 2008 Summer Olympics in Beijing. He qualified the Games after receiving a wildcard from the Olympic Solidarity Committee which was announced in the week before the start of the Olympics and was the last Rwandan athlete to attain qualification. After being eliminated from the heat stages in the previous Olympic Games in Beijing Niyomugao said he wanted to win a medal in London and that if he had more support, he would possibly be able to swim quicker but hoped to see the results. He was drawn in the second heat of the men's 50 metre freestyle on 2 August, finishing fourth out of seven swimmers, with a time of 27.38 seconds. Overall he finished 52nd out of 58 competitors overall, but did not progress to the semi-finals because her time was 5.11 seconds slower than the slowest swimmer who made the later stages.

Aged 16, Alphonsine Agahozo was the youngest person to compete for Rwanda in London and debuted at the Summer Games. She qualified for the Games via a universality place by swimming's world governing body FINA because her fastest time of 5.65 seconds slower than the "B" qualifying standard for the women's 50 metre freestyle. In an interview with Reuters before the Games Agahozo said that she was competing against the world but noted that she had experience in other events and felt she would be "ok". She took part in the third heat of event on 3 August, finishing third out of eight competitors, with a time of 30.72 seconds. Overall Agahozo finished 58th out of 73 swimmers, (Note: One swimmer, Eszter Dara, did not start.) and was 5.44 seconds slower than the slowest competitor who progressed to the later stages and did not advance to the semi-finals.

Men

Athlete	Event	Heat		Semifinal		Final	
Athlete	Event	Time	Rank	Time	Rank	Time	Rank
Jackson Niyomugabo	50 m freestyle	27.38	52	Did not advance			

Women

Athlete	Event	Heat		Semifinal		Final	
Athlete	Event	Time	Rank	Time	Rank	Time	Rank
Alphonsine Agahozo	50 m freestyle	30.72	58	Did not advance			

== See also ==
- Rwanda at the 2012 Summer Paralympics
