= List of Rwandan records in athletics =

The following are the national records in athletics in Rwanda maintained by its national athletics federation: Rwanda Athletics Federation (RAF).

== Outdoor ==
Key to tables: Awaiting ratification Record not kept by FRA Not ratified or later rescinded by FRA

=== Men ===
Event	Record	Athlete	Date	Meet	Place	Ref.
100 m	11.35 (−0.4 m/s)	Islam Mulinda	18 July 2007	All-Africa Games	Algiers, Algeria	
200 m	22.17 (+0.1 m/s)	Emmanuel Rubayiza	19 April 1997		Athens, United States	
400 m	47.93 A	Emmanuel Nitakiyimana	7 July 2016		Kampala, Uganda	
800 m	1:49.35	Alexis Sharangabo	26 May 1999		Nassau, The Bahamas	
1500 m	3:38.16	Alexis Sharangabo	29 July 2000		Stanford, United States	
Mile	3:57.82	Alexis Sharangabo	20 August 2000	Falmouth Mile	Falmouth, United States	
3000 m	7:41.64	Mathias Ntawulikura	16 August 1992		Cologne, Germany	
5000 m	13:11.29	Mathias Ntawulikura	9 June 1992		Rome, Italy	
5 km (road)	14:50+	John Hakizimana	1 February 2026	Dubai Marathon	Dubai, United Arab Emirates	
10,000 m	27:22.28	Dieudonné Disi	14 September 2007	Memorial Van Damme	Brussels, Belgium	
10 km (road)	28:25	Dieudonné Disi	20 September 2008		Roanne, France	
15 km (road)	44:02+	John Hakizimana	1 February 2026	Dubai Marathon	Dubai, United Arab Emirates	
10 miles (road)	46:58	Noel Hitimana	2 September 2018	Tilburg Ten Miles	Tilburg, Netherlands	
20 km (road)	57:42	Dieudonné Disi	8 October 2006	World Road Running Championships	Debrecen, Hungary	
Half marathon	59:32	Dieudonné Disi	14 October 2007	World Road Running Championships	Udine, Italy	
25 km (road)	1:13:25+	John Hakizimana	1 February 2026	Dubai Marathon	Dubai, United Arab Emirates	
30 km (road)	1:28:27+	John Hakizimana	1 February 2026	Dubai Marathon	Dubai, United Arab Emirates	
Marathon	2:06:04	John Hakizimana	1 February 2026	Dubai Marathon	Dubai, United Arab Emirates	
110 m hurdles	15.5 h	Augustin Kabanda	22 August 1987		Kigali, Rwanda	
400 m hurdles	54.36	Faustin Butéra	3 August 1984	Olympic Games	Los Angeles, United States	
400 m hurdles	54.0 h	Faustin Butéra	April 1987	Central African Games	Brazzaville, Republic of the Congo	
400 m hurdles	53.7 h	Faustin Butéra	1979			
3000 m steeplechase	8:39.05	Gervais Hakizimana	28 May 2011	Meeting National D2	Pézenas, France	
3000 m steeplechase	8:24.57	Nyiramsabimama Angelime	11 September 2011	All-Africa Games	Maputo, Mozambique	
High jump	2.01 m	Ian Kagame	20 April 2019		Williamstown, United States	
Pole vault	4.10 m	Jean-Baptiste Biményimana	16 November 1981		Bugesera, Rwanda	
Long jump	6.80 m	Emmanuel Nkurunziza	10 July 2010		Kigali, Rwanda	
Triple jump	15.02 m	Albert Sézikéyé	14 May 1987		Montpellier, France	
Shot put	14.05 m	François Rwéma	29 July 1981		Valbonne, France	
Discus throw	43.00 m	Augustin Kabanda	24 May 1976		Kigali, Rwanda	
Hammer throw						
Javelin throw	45.82 m	Twizere	1/2 June 2002		Kigali, Rwanda	
Decathlon						
Decathlon	100m (wind) / Long jump (wind) / Shot put / High jump / 400m / 110m H (wind) / Discus / Pole vault / Javelin / 1500m					
20 km walk (road)						
50 km walk (road)						
4 × 100 m relay	43.6 h A	Rwanda; Frank Minani; Islam Mulinda; Saidi Hamsi Ndayisaba; J.D. Barabesya	3 December 2006		Nairobi, Kenya	
4 × 400 m relay	3:21.01 A	Rwanda; Hermas Muvunyi; Emmanuel Ntakirutimana; Thimote Bagina; Moussa Bizimana	31 July 2010	African Championships	Nairobi, Kenya	

=== Women ===
Event	Record	Athlete	Date	Meet	Place	Ref.
100 m	13.19 NWI A	Sophie Kanakuzé	3 December 2006		Nairobi, Kenya	
200 m	26.76 A (−2.4 m/s)	Sophie Kanakuzé	31 July 2010	African Championships	Nairobi, Kenya	
400 m	58.26	Épiphanie Uwintije	18 July 2007	All-Africa Games	Algiers, Algeria	
800 m	2:00.32	Claire Uwitonze	2 September 2025	24th Volksbank Trier Eifel Flutlichtmeeting	Trier, Germany	
1500 m	4:08.75	Beatha Nishimwe	24 June 2016	African Championships	Durban, South Africa	
3000 m	8:59.90	Marciana Mukamurenzi	27 July 1991		Dijon, France	
5000 m	14:59.92	Emeline Imanizabayo	29 July 2026	Commonwealth Games	Glasgow, United Kingdom	
5 km	15:07 Wo	Emeline Imanizabayo	18 April 2026	Seven Hills Record Run	Nijmegen, Netherlands	
10,000 m	31:43.73	Florence Niyonkuru	15 May 2026	African Championships	Accra, Ghana	
10 km (road)	30:39	Emeline Imanizabayo	4 April 2026	Urban Trail de Lille	Lille, France	
15 km (road)	47:10+ Wo	Florence Niyonkuru	20 September 2026	World Road Running Championships	Copenhagen, Denmark	
20 km (road)	1:02:47+ Wo	Florence Niyonkuru	20 September 2026	World Road Running Championships	Copenhagen, Denmark	
Half marathon	1:06:08 Wo	Florence Niyonkuru	20 September 2026	World Road Running Championships	Copenhagen, Denmark	
30 km (road)	1:43:36+	Clementine Mukandanga	26 November 2023	Florence Marathon	Florence, Italy	
Marathon	2:25:54 (Note: by official result source; 2:25:53 by RAF source)	Clementine Mukandanga	26 November 2023	Florence Marathon	Florence, Italy	
100 m hurdles	18.60	Dativa Mukandinda	29 June 2002		Blois, France	
400 m hurdles						
3000 m steeplechase						
High jump	1.40 m	Immaculée Mukambuguje	30 May 1976		Kigali, Rwanda	
Pole vault						
Long jump	5.10 m	Béatrice Nyiraguhirwa	15 May 1988		Kicukiro, Rwanda	
Triple jump	10.32 m	Dativa Mukandinda	15 June 2003		Beauvais, France	
Shot put	10.26 m	Félicité Uwilingiyimana	28 April 2007		Namur, Belgium	
Discus throw	31.62 m	Chantal Sezikeye	24 September 2006		Orvieto, Italy	
Hammer throw	39.58 m	Félicité Uwilingiyimana	26 April 2006		Nivelles, Belgium	
Javelin throw	33.94 m	Dativa Mukandinda	5 May 2002		Nogent-sur-Oise, France	
Heptathlon						
Heptathlon	100m H (wind) / High jump / Shot put / 200m (wind) / Long jump (wind) / Javelin / 800m					
20 km walk (road)						
50 km walk (road)						
4 × 100 m relay	51.2 h	Rwanda; L. Umukundwa	3 September 2016		Eldoret, Kenya	
4 × 400 m relay	3:58.3 h	Rwanda; C. Akingeneye	3 September 2016		Eldoret, Kenya	

== Indoor ==
=== Men ===
Event	Record	Athlete	Date	Meet	Place	Ref.
60 m						
200 m						
400 m	50.25	Emmanuel Rubayiza	7 March 1997	World Championships	Paris, France	
800 m						
1500 m	3:49.81	Alexis Sharangabo	6 March 1999	World Championships	Maebashi, Japan	
3000 m	7:44.19	Mathias Ntawulikura	8 March 1992		Sindelfingen, Germany	
5000 m	13:24.34	Mathias Ntawulikura	4 March 1992		San Sebastián, Spain	
60 m hurdles						
High jump						
Pole vault						
Long jump	5.62 m	Clement Manaliyo	19 January 2003		Dijon, France	
Triple jump						
Shot put						
Heptathlon						
Heptathlon	60m / Long jump / Shot put / High jump / 60m H / Pole vault / 1000m					
5000 m walk						
4 × 400 m relay						

=== Women ===
Event	Record	Athlete	Date	Meet	Place	Ref.
60 m	8.98	Dativa Mukandinda	18 January 2003		Nogent-sur-Oise, France	
200 m						
400 m						
800 m	3:16.36 (Note: record set during pentathlon competition)	Dativa Mukandinda	12 January 2003		Nogent-sur-Oise, France	
1500 m	4:17.33	Claire Uwitonze	21 March 2025	World Championships	Nanjing, China	
3000 m	9:26.89	Claudette Mukasakindi	9 March 2012	World Championships	Istanbul, Turkey	
60 m hurdles	10.98 (Note: record set during pentathlon competition)	Dativa Mukandinda	12 January 2003		Nogent-sur-Oise, France	
High jump	1.24 m (Note: record set during pentathlon competition)	Dativa Mukandinda	12 January 2003		Nogent-sur-Oise, France	
Pole vault						
Long jump	4.38 m (Note: record set during pentathlon competition)	Dativa Mukandinda	12 January 2003		Nogent-sur-Oise, France	
Triple jump	10.12 m	Dativa Mukandinda	18 January 2003		Nogent-sur-Oise, France	
Shot put	9.54 m	Félicité Uwilingiyimana	27 January 2007		Ghent, Belgium	
Pentathlon	1845 pts	Dativa Mukandinda	12 January 2003		Nogent-sur-Oise, France	
Pentathlon	60m H / High jump / Shot put / Long jump / 800m; 10.98 / 1.24 m / 6.90 m / 4.38 m / 3:16.36					
3000 m walk						
4 × 400 m relay						
