= Rwanda at the 2023 World Athletics Championships =

- Flag of Rwanda
- WA code: RWA

in Budapest, Hungary 19 August 2023 – 27 August 2023
- Competitors: 3 (2 men and 1 woman)
- Medals: Gold 0 Silver 0 Bronze 0 Total 0

World Athletics Championships appearances
- 1983; 1987; 1991; 1993; 1995; 1997; 1999; 2001; 2003; 2005; 2007; 2009; 2011; 2013; 2015; 2017; 2019; 2022; 2023

Rwanda competed at the 2023 World Athletics Championships in Budapest, Hungary, from 19 to 27 August 2023.

== Results ==
Rwanda entered 3 athletes.

Key

- Q = Qualified for the next round
- q = Qualified for the next round as a fastest loser or, in field events, by position without achieving the qualifying target
- NR = National record
- PB = Personal best
- SB = Season best
- N/A = Round not applicable for the event

=== Men ===
Track and road events

Athlete	Event	Final	
Athlete	Event	Result	Rank
John Hakizimana	Marathon	2:10:50	9
Felicien Muhitira	Marathon	DNF	

=== Women ===
Track and road events

Athlete	Event	Final	
Athlete	Event	Result	Rank
Clementine Mukandanga	Marathon	2:37:09 SB	37
