= Rwanda at the 1984 Summer Olympics =

- IOC code: RWA
- NOC: Comité National Olympique et Sportif du Rwanda

in Los Angeles
- Competitors: 3 (2 men and 1 woman) in 1 sport
- Flag bearer: Emmanuel Twagirayezu
- Medals: Gold 0 Silver 0 Bronze 0 Total 0

Summer Olympics appearances (overview)
- 1984; 1988; 1992; 1996; 2000; 2004; 2008; 2012; 2016; 2020; 2024

Rwanda competed in the Olympic Games for the first time at the 1984 Summer Olympics in Los Angeles, United States.

== Athletics ==
Men
Track & road events

Athlete	Event	Heat		Quarterfinal		Semifinal		Final	
Athlete	Event	Result	Rank	Result	Rank	Result	Rank	Result	Rank
Faustin Butéra	400 m	51.41	8	did not advance					
Faustin Butéra	400 m hurdles	54.36	7	did not advance					
Jean-Marie Rudasingwa	800 m	1:53.23	6	did not advance					
Jean-Marie Rudasingwa	1500 m	3:57.62	8	did not advance					

Women
Track & road events

Athlete	Event	Heat		Quarterfinal		Semifinal		Final	
Athlete	Event	Result	Rank	Result	Rank	Result	Rank	Result	Rank
Mariciane Mukamurenzi	1500 m	4:31.56	10	did not advance					
Mariciane Mukamurenzi	3000 m	9.27.08	7	did not advance					
