= Rwanda at the 1992 Summer Olympics =

- IOC code: RWA
- NOC: Comité National Olympique et Sportif du Rwanda

in Barcelona
- Competitors: 10 (7 men and 3 women) in 2 sports
- Medals: Gold 0 Silver 0 Bronze 0 Total 0

Summer Olympics appearances (overview)
- 1984; 1988; 1992; 1996; 2000; 2004; 2008; 2012; 2016; 2020; 2024

Rwanda competed at the 1992 Summer Olympics in Barcelona, Spain. Ten competitors, seven men and three women, took part in eight events in two sports.

== Competitors ==
The following is the list of number of competitors in the Games.

Sport	Men	Women	Total
Athletics	4	3	7
Cycling	3	0	3
Total	7	3	10

== Athletics ==
Men
Track & road events

Athlete	Event	Heat		Semifinal		Final	
Athlete	Event	Result	Rank	Result	Rank	Result	Rank
Alphonse Munyeshyaka	1500 m	3:58.75	13	did not advance			
Seraphin Mugabo	5000 m	14:25.97	11	n/a		did not advance	
Mathias Ntawulikura	10000 m	28:51.97	12	n/a		did not advance	
Ildephonse Sehirwa	Marathon	n/a				2:27.44	60

Women
Track & road events

Athlete	Event	Heat		Semifinals		Final	
Athlete	Event	Result	Rank	Result	Rank	Result	Rank
Laurence Niyonsaba	1500 m	4:24.87	11	did not advance			
Inmaculle Naberaho	3000 m	10.02.62	10	n/a		did not advance	
Marcianne Mukamurenzi	10000 m	33:00:66	12	n/a		did not advance	

== Cycling ==
=== Road ===
Athlete	Event	Time	Rank
Faustin Mparabanyi	Men's road race	DNF	
Emmanuel Nkurunziza	Men's road race	DNF	
Alphonse Nshimiyiama	Men's road race	DNF	
