= Rwanda at the 2024 Summer Olympics =

- Flag of Rwanda
- IOC code: RWA
- NOC: Rwanda National Olympic and Sports Committee
- Website: olympicrwanda.org

in Paris, France 26 July 2024 – 11 August 2024
- Competitors: 8 (3 men and 5 women) in 4 sports
- Flag bearers: Eric Manizabayo & Clementine Mukandanga
- Medals: Gold 0 Silver 0 Bronze 0 Total 0

Summer Olympics appearances (overview)
- 1984; 1988; 1992; 1996; 2000; 2004; 2008; 2012; 2016; 2020; 2024

Rwanda competed at the 2024 Summer Olympics in Paris from 26 July to 11 August 2024. It was the nation's eleventh consecutive appearance at the Summer Olympics, since the nation's official debut at 1984.

== Competitors ==
The following is the list of number of competitors in the Games.

Sport	Men	Women	Total
Athletics	1	1	2
Cycling	1	2	3
Fencing	0	1	1
Swimming	1	1	2
Total	3	5	8

== Athletics ==
Rwandan track and field athletes achieved the entry standards for Paris 2024, either by passing the direct qualifying mark (or time for track and road races) or by world ranking, in the following events (a maximum of 3 athletes each):

Key

- Note–Ranks given for track events are within the athlete's heat only
- Q = Qualified for the next round
- q = Qualified for the next round as a fastest loser or, in field events, by position without achieving the qualifying target
- NR = National record
- N/A = Round not applicable for the event
- Bye = Athlete not required to compete in round

Track and road events

Athlete	Event	Final	
Athlete	Event	Result	Rank
Yves Nimubona	Men's 10000 m	27:54.12	21
Clementine Mukandanga	Women's marathon	2:45:40 SB	77

== Cycling ==
=== Road ===
Rwanda entered one male and one female rider to compete in the road race events at the Olympic, through the establishment of UCI Nation Ranking.

Athlete	Event	Time	Rank
Eric Manizabayo	Men's road race	DNF	—
Diane Ingabire	Women's road race	DNF	—
Diane Ingabire	Women's time trial	48:05.24	35

=== Mountain biking ===
Rwandan mountain bikers secured one female quota place for the Olympic by receiving the allocations of universality spots.

Athlete	Event	Time	Rank
Jazilla Mwamikazi	Women's cross-country	-5 LAP	34

== Fencing ==
Rwanda entered one fencer into the Olympic competition. Uwihoreye Tufaha qualified for the games through the allocations of universality spots; signifying the nations debut in these sports.

Athlete	Event	Round of 64	Round of 32	Round of 16	Quarterfinal	Semifinal	Final / BM	
Athlete	Event	Opposition Score	Opposition Score	Opposition Score	Opposition Score	Opposition Score	Opposition Score	Rank
Uwihoreye Tufaha	Women's épée	Yoshimura (JPN); L 7–15	Did not advance					

== Swimming ==
Rwanda sent two swimmers to compete at the 2024 Paris Olympics.

Athlete	Event	Heat		Semifinal		Final	
Athlete	Event	Time	Rank	Time	Rank	Time	Rank
Oscar Peyre Mitilla	Men's 100 m butterfly	58.77	38	Did not advance			
Lidwine Umuhoza Uwase	Women's 50 m freestyle	32.03	70	Did not advance			

Qualifiers for the latter rounds (Q) of all events were decided on a time only basis, therefore positions shown are overall results versus competitors in all heats.
