= Rwanda at the 2004 Summer Olympics =

- IOC code: RWA
- NOC: Comité National Olympique et Sportif du Rwanda

in Athens
- Competitors: 5 in 2 sports
- Flag bearer: Mathias Ntawulikura
- Medals: Gold 0 Silver 0 Bronze 0 Total 0

Summer Olympics appearances (overview)
- 1984; 1988; 1992; 1996; 2000; 2004; 2008; 2012; 2016; 2020; 2024

Rwanda competed at the 2004 Summer Olympics in Athens, Greece, from 13 to 29 August 2004.

== Athletics ==
Rwandan athletes have so far achieved qualifying standards in the following athletics events (up to a maximum of 3 athletes in each event at the 'A' Standard, and 1 at the 'B' Standard).

Men

Athlete	Event	Final	
Athlete	Event	Result	Rank
Dieudonne Disi	10000 m	28:43.19	17
Mathias Ntawulikura	Marathon	2:26:05	62

Women

Athlete	Event	Final	
Athlete	Event	Result	Rank
Epiphanie Nyirabarame	Marathon	2:52:50	54

Key

- Note–Ranks given for track events are within the athlete's heat only
- Q = Qualified for the next round
- q = Qualified for the next round as a fastest loser or, in field events, by position without achieving the qualifying target
- NR = National record
- N/A = Round not applicable for the event
- Bye = Athlete not required to compete in round

== Swimming ==
Men

Athlete	Event	Heat		Semifinal		Final	
Athlete	Event	Time	Rank	Time	Rank	Time	Rank
Leonce Sekamana	50 m freestyle	28.99	78	did not advance			

Women

Athlete	Event	Heat		Semifinal		Final	
Athlete	Event	Time	Rank	Time	Rank	Time	Rank
Pamela Girimbabazi	100 m breaststroke	1:50.39	48	did not advance			
