= Rwanda at the 1988 Summer Olympics =

- IOC code: RWA
- NOC: Comité National Olympique et Sportif du Rwanda

in Seoul
- Competitors: 6 (3 men and 3 women) in 1 sport
- Flag bearer: Mathias Ntawulikura
- Medals: Gold 0 Silver 0 Bronze 0 Total 0

Summer Olympics appearances (overview)
- 1984; 1988; 1992; 1996; 2000; 2004; 2008; 2012; 2016; 2020; 2024

Rwanda competed at the 1988 Summer Olympics in Seoul, South Korea.

== Competitors ==
The following is the list of number of competitors in the Games.

Sport	Men	Women	Total
Athletics	3	3	6
Total	3	3	6

== Athletics ==
Men
Track & road events

Athlete	Event	Heat		Quarterfinal		Semifinal		Final	
Athlete	Event	Result	Rank	Result	Rank	Result	Rank	Result	Rank
Eulucane Ndagijimana	800 m	1:52.08	6	Did not advance					
Eulucane Ndagijimana	1500 m	3:51.61	10	n/a		did not advance			
Mathias Ntawulikura	5000 m	14:08.84	17	n/a		did not advance			
Telesphore Dusabe	Marathon	n/a						2:42.52	78

Women
Track & road events

Athlete	Event	Heat		Final	
Athlete	Event	Result	Rank	Result	Rank
Daphrose Nyiramutuzo	1500 m	4:32.31	13	did not advance	
Daphrose Nyiramutuzo	3000 m	9.47.98	15	did not advance	
Marcianne Mukamurenzi	Marathon	n/a		2:40:12	38
Apollinarie Nyinawabéra	Marathon	n/a		2:49.18	50
