= Rwanda at the 2016 Summer Olympics =

- IOC code: RWA
- NOC: Comité National Olympique et Sportif du Rwanda

in Rio de Janeiro
- Competitors: 7 in 3 sports
- Flag bearer: Adrien Niyonshuti
- Medals: Gold 0 Silver 0 Bronze 0 Total 0

Summer Olympics appearances (overview)
- 1984; 1988; 1992; 1996; 2000; 2004; 2008; 2012; 2016; 2020; 2024

Rwanda competed at the 2016 Summer Olympics in Rio de Janeiro, Brazil, from 5 to 21 August 2016. This was the nation's ninth consecutive appearance at the Summer Olympics.

The Rwandan National Olympic and Sports Committee (French: Comité National Olympique et Sportif du Rwanda) selected a team of seven athletes, four men and three women, to compete only in athletics, road cycling, mountain biking, and swimming at the Olympics, matching the nation's roster size with London 2012. The Rwandan delegation featured two returning Olympians from the previous Games, including marathon runner Claudette Mukasakindi, and road cyclist Adrien Niyonshuti, who reprised his role of carrying the nation's flag for the second time in the opening ceremony.

== Athletics (track and field) ==
Rwandan athletes have so far achieved qualifying standards in the following athletics events (up to a maximum of 3 athletes in each event):

Key

- Note–Ranks given for track events are within the athlete's heat only
- Q = Qualified for the next round
- q = Qualified for the next round as a fastest loser or, in field events, by position without achieving the qualifying target
- NR = National record
- N/A = Round not applicable for the event
- Bye = Athlete not required to compete in round

Track & road events

Athlete	Event	Final	
Athlete	Event	Result	Rank
Ambroise Uwiragiye	Men's marathon	2:25:57	99
Claudette Mukasakindi	Women's marathon	3:05:57	126
Salome Nyirarukundo	Women's 10000 m	32:07.80	27

== Cycling ==
=== Road ===
Rwanda has qualified one rider in the men's Olympic road race by virtue of his top 10 individual ranking in the 2015 UCI Africa Tour.

Athlete	Event	Time	Rank
Adrien Niyonshuti	Men's road race	Did not finish	

=== Mountain biking ===
Rwanda has qualified one mountain biker for the men's Olympic cross-country race, by virtue of a top two national finish, not yet qualified, at the 2015 African Championships.

Athlete	Event	Time	Rank
Nathan Byukusenge	Men's cross-country	LAP (3 laps)	41

== Swimming ==
Rwanda has received a Universality invitation from FINA to send two swimmers (one male and one female) to the Olympics.

Athlete	Event	Heat		Semifinal		Final	
Athlete	Event	Time	Rank	Time	Rank	Time	Rank
Eloi Imaniraguha	Men's 50 m freestyle	26.43	68	Did not advance			
Johanna Umurungi	Women's 100 m butterfly	1:11.92	44	Did not advance			
