= Rwanda at the 2020 Summer Olympics =

- Flag of Rwanda
- IOC code: RWA
- NOC: Rwanda National Olympic and Sports Committee
- Website: olympicrwanda.org

in Tokyo, Japan July 23, 2021 – August 8, 2021
- Competitors: 5 in 3 sports
- Flag bearers (opening): Alphonsine Agahozo; John Hakizimana
- Flag bearer (closing): John Hakizimana
- Medals: Gold 0 Silver 0 Bronze 0 Total 0

Summer Olympics appearances (overview)
- 1984; 1988; 1992; 1996; 2000; 2004; 2008; 2012; 2016; 2020; 2024

Rwanda competed at the 2020 Summer Olympics in Tokyo. Originally scheduled to take place from 24 July to 9 August 2020, the Games were postponed to 23 July to 8 August 2021, because of the COVID-19 pandemic. It was the nation's tenth consecutive appearance at the Summer Olympics.

== Competitors ==
The following is the list of number of competitors in the Games.

| Sport | Men | Women | Total |
|---|---|---|---|
| Athletics | 1 | 1 | 2 |
| Cycling | 1 | 0 | 1 |
| Swimming | 1 | 1 | 2 |
| Total | 3 | 2 | 5 |

== Athletics ==
Rwandan athletes achieved the entry standards, either by qualifying time or by world ranking, in the following track and field events (up to a maximum of 3 athletes in each event):

Key

- Note–Ranks given for track events are within the athlete's heat only
- Q = Qualified for the next round
- q = Qualified for the next round as a fastest loser or, in field events, by position without achieving the qualifying target
- NR = National record
- N/A = Round not applicable for the event
- Bye = Athlete not required to compete in round

Track & road events

| Athlete | Event | Heat | | Final | |
| Athlete | Event | Result | Rank | Result | Rank |
|---|---|---|---|---|---|
| John Hakizimana | Men's marathon | — | | DNF | |
| Marthe Yankurije | Women's 5000 m | 15:55.94 SB | 17 | Did not advance | |

== Cycling ==
=== Road ===
Rwanda entered one rider to compete in the men's Olympic road race, by virtue of his top 50 national finish (for men) in the UCI World Ranking.

| Athlete | Event | Time | Rank |
|---|---|---|---|
| Moise Mugisha | Men's road race | Did not finish | |

== Swimming ==
Rwanda received a universality invitation from FINA to send two top-ranked swimmers (one per gender) in their respective individual events to the Olympics, based on the FINA Points System of June 28, 2021.

| Athlete | Event | Heat | | Semifinal | | Final | |
| Athlete | Event | Time | Rank | Time | Rank | Time | Rank |
|---|---|---|---|---|---|---|---|
| Eloi Maniraguha | Men's 50 m freestyle | 25.38 | 55 | Did not advance | | | |
| Alphonsine Agahozo | Women's 50 m freestyle | 30.50 | 72 | Did not advance | | | |
