= Rwanda at the 2008 Summer Olympics =

- IOC code: RWA
- NOC: Comité National Olympique et Sportif du Rwanda

in Beijing
- Competitors: 4 in 2 sports
- Flag bearer: Pamela Girimbabazi
- Medals: Gold 0 Silver 0 Bronze 0 Total 0

Summer Olympics appearances (overview)
- 1984; 1988; 1992; 1996; 2000; 2004; 2008; 2012; 2016; 2020; 2024

Rwanda competed in the 2008 Summer Olympics held in Beijing, People's Republic of China from August 8 to August 24, 2008. As of June 26, 2008, only four Rwandan representatives have qualified to compete in Beijing - two in athletics and two in swimming.

== Athletics ==
Men

Athlete	Event	Final	
Athlete	Event	Result	Rank
Dieudonné Disi	10000 m	27:56.74	19

Women

Athlete	Event	Final	
Athlete	Event	Result	Rank
Epiphanie Nyirabarame	Marathon	2:49:32	66

Key

- Note–Ranks given for track events are within the athlete's heat only
- Q = Qualified for the next round
- q = Qualified for the next round as a fastest loser or, in field events, by position without achieving the qualifying target
- NR = National record
- N/A = Round not applicable for the event
- Bye = Athlete not required to compete in round

== Swimming ==
Men

Athlete	Event	Heat		Semifinal		Final	
Athlete	Event	Time	Rank	Time	Rank	Time	Rank
Jackson Niyomugabo	50 m freestyle	27.74	82	did not advance			

Women

Athlete	Event	Heat		Semifinal		Final	
Athlete	Event	Time	Rank	Time	Rank	Time	Rank
Pamela Girimbabazi	50 m freestyle	39.78	88	did not advance			

== See also ==
- Rwanda at the 2008 Summer Paralympics
