= Rwanda at the 2000 Summer Olympics =

- IOC code: RWA
- NOC: Rwanda National Olympic and Sports Committee

in Sydney
- Competitors: 5 in 2 sports
- Flag bearer: Pierre Karemera
- Medals: Gold 0 Silver 0 Bronze 0 Total 0

Summer Olympics appearances (overview)
- 1984; 1988; 1992; 1996; 2000; 2004; 2008; 2012; 2016; 2020; 2024

Rwanda was represented at the 2000 Summer Olympics in Sydney, New South Wales, Australia by the Rwanda National Olympic and Sports Committee.

In total, five athletes including three men and two women represented Rwanda in two different sports including athletics and swimming.

== Background ==
Rwanda made their Olympic debut at the 1984 Summer Olympics in Los Angeles, California, United States. They had since established themselves as regular Olympic competitors and had attended every games since. The 2000 Summer Olympics in Sydney, New South Wales, Australia marked their fifth appearance at the Olympics. Prior to 2000, they had not won an Olympic medal – their best previous result was when Mathias Ntawulikura finished eighth in the men's 10,000 m at the 1996 Summer Olympics in Atlanta, Georgia, United States.

== Competitors ==
In total, five athletes represented Rwanda at the 2000 Summer Olympics in Sydney, New South Wales, Australia across two different sports.

Sport	Men	Women	Total
Athletics	2	1	3
Swimming	1	1	2
Total	3	2	5

== Athletics ==
In total, two Rwandan athletes participated in the athletics events – Mathias Ntawulikura in the men's marathon and Alexis Sharangabo in the men's 1,500 m.

The athletics events took place at the Sydney Olympic Stadium in Sydney Olympic Park, Sydney from 22 September – 1 October 2000.

Men

Athlete	Event	Heat		Semifinals		Final	
Athlete	Event	Result	Rank	Result	Rank	Result	Rank
Alexis Sharangabo	1,500 m	3:44.06	11	did not advance			
Mathias Ntawulikura	Marathon	n/a				2:16:39	15

Women

Athlete	Event	Heat		Semifinals		Final	
Athlete	Event	Result	Rank	Result	Rank	Result	Rank
Christine Mukamutesi	800 m	2:14:15	6	did not advance			

== Swimming ==
In total, two Rwandan athletes participated in the swimming events – Pamela Girimbabazi in the women's 100 m breaststroke and Samson Ndayishimiye in the men's 50 m freestyle.

The swimming events took place at the Sydney Olympic Park Aquatic Centre in Sydney Olympic Park, Sydney from 16–23 September 2000.

Men

Athlete	Event	Heat		Semifinal		Final	
Athlete	Event	Time	Rank	Time	Rank	Time	Rank
Samson Ndayishimiye	50 m freestyle	38.76	75	did not advance			

Women

Athlete	Event	Heat		Semifinal		Final	
Athlete	Event	Time	Rank	Time	Rank	Time	Rank
Pamela Girimbabazi	100 m breaststroke	DSQ		did not advance			

== Sources ==
- Wallechinsky, David (2004). The Complete Book of the Summer Olympics (Athens 2004 Edition). Toronto, Canada. ISBN 1-894963-32-6.
- International Olympic Committee (2001). The Results. Retrieved 12 November 2005.
- Sydney Organising Committee for the Olympic Games (2001). Official Report of the XXVII Olympiad Volume 1: Preparing for the Games. Retrieved 20 November 2005.
- Sydney Organising Committee for the Olympic Games (2001). Official Report of the XXVII Olympiad Volume 2: Celebrating the Games. Retrieved 20 November 2005.
- Sydney Organising Committee for the Olympic Games (2001). The Results. Retrieved 20 November 2005.
- International Olympic Committee Web Site
