= 2018–2020 CAVB Beach Volleyball Continental Cup =

African beach volleyball qualification tournament

The 2018–2020 CAVB Beach Volleyball Continental Cup were a beach volleyball double-gender event. Teams representing African countries were split into groups of four, where an elimination bracket determined the 2 teams to advance to the next stage from the sub-zones. The winners of the event qualified for the 2020 Summer Olympics.

== Men ==
=== First round ===
==== Pool 1 ====
- Pool 1 was contested in Tunis, Tunisia.

Date	Time		Score		Set 1	Set 2	Set 3	Total	Report
7 Dec		Tunisia 1	2–0	Morocco 2	21–15	21–15		42–30	
7 Dec		Morocco 1	2–0	Tunisia 1	21–19	25–23		46–42	
		Tunisia	15–13 (GS)	Morocco					

Final Ranking

1. Tunisia
2. Morocco
  - Tunisia qualified for second round of CAVB Beach Continental Cup.

==== Pool 2 ====
- Pool 2 was contested in Kololi, Gambia.

Date	Time		Score		Set 1	Set 2	Set 3	Total	Report
22 Nov		The Gambia 1	2–0	Mali 2	21–16	21–14		42–30	
22 Nov		The Gambia 2	2–0	Mali 1	21–13	21–17		42–30	
22 Nov		Sierra Leone 1	2–0	Guinea 2	21–17	21–7		42–24	
22 Nov		Sierra Leone 2	2–0	Guinea 1	21–12	21–12		42–24	
23 Nov		Mali 1	0–2	Sierra Leone 2	17–21	16–21		33–42	
23 Nov		Mali 2	0–2	Sierra Leone 1	8–21	17–21		25–42	
23 Nov		Guinea 1	0–2	The Gambia 2	16–21	17–21		33–42	
23 Nov		Guinea 2	0–2	The Gambia 1	13–21	15–21		28–42	
24 Nov		Mali 1	2–0	Guinea 2	21–18	21–13		42–31	
24 Nov		Mali 2	0–2	Guinea 1	13–21	16–21		29–42	
		Mali	15–7 (GS)	Guinea					
24 Nov		The Gambia 1	2–0	Sierra Leone 2	21–9	21–9		42–18	
24 Nov		The Gambia 2	2–0	Sierra Leone 1	21–11	21–13		42–24	

Final Ranking

1. The Gambia
2. Sierra Leone
3. Mali
4. Guinea
  - Gambia and Sierra Leone qualified for second round of CAVB Beach Continental Cup.

==== Pool 3 ====
- Pool 3 was contested in Accra, Ghana.

Date	Time		Score		Set 1	Set 2	Set 3	Total	Report
3 Jan		Togo 1	2–0	Ivory Coast 2	21–15	21–16		42–31	
3 Jan		Togo 2	2–0	Ivory Coast 1	21–09	21–09		42–18	
4 jan		Ghana 1	2–0	Togo 2	21–14	21–09		42–23	
4 Jan		Ghana 2	2–0	Togo 1	21–16	21–13		42–29	
5 jan		Ghana 1	2–0	Ivory Coast 2	21–06	21–05		42–11	
5 Jan		Ghana 2	2–0	Ivory Coast 1	21–12	21–13		42–25	

Final Ranking

1. Ghana
2. Togo
3. Ivory Coast
  - Ghana and Togo qualified for second round of CAVB Beach Continental Cup.

==== Pool 4 ====
- Pool 4 was contested in Kinshasa, Democratic Republic of the Congo.

Date	Time		Score		Set 1	Set 2	Set 3	Total	Report
11 Jan		Republic of the Congo 1	2–0	Democratic Republic of the Congo 2	21–9	21–18		42–27	
11 Jan		Republic of the Congo 2	0–2	Democratic Republic of the Congo 1	15–21	19–21		34–42	
		Republic of the Congo	17–15 (GS)	Democratic Republic of the Congo					

Final Ranking

1. Republic of the Congo
2. Democratic Republic of the Congo
3. Central African Republic
  - Congo and Democratic Republic of the Congo qualified for second round of CAVB Beach Continental Cup.

==== Pool 5 ====
- Pool 5 was contested in Entebbe, Uganda.

Date	Time		Score		Set 1	Set 2	Set 3	Total	Report
19 Dec		Kenya 2	2–1	Sudan 1	21–17	15–21	18–16	54–54	
19 Dec		Kenya 1	2–0	Sudan 2	21–15	22–20		43–35	
19 Dec		Uganda 1	2–0	Tanzania 2	21–16	21–9		42–25	
19 Dec		Uganda 2	0–2	Tanzania 1	18–21	15–21		33–42	
		Tanzania	16–14 (GS)	Uganda					
20 Dec		Tanzania 1	2–0	Kenya 2	21–19	21–18		42–37	
20 Dec		Tanzania 2	0–2	Kenya 1	13–21	10–21		23–42	
		Tanzania	15–12 (GS)	Kenya					
20 Dec		Uganda 1	2–1	Sudan 2	18–21	21–13	15–11	54–45	
20 Dec		Uganda 2	0–2	Sudan 1	17–21	12–21		29–42	
		Uganda	11–15 (GS)	Sudan					
21 Dec		Sudan 1	2–1	Tanzania 2	21–8	18–21	15–7	54–36	
21 Dec		Sudan 2	0–2	Tanzania 1	15–21	13–21		28–42	
		Sudan	10–15 (GS)	Tanzania					
21 Dec		Kenya 1	2–0	Uganda 2	21–12	21–10		42–22	
21 Dec		Kenya 2	2–0	Uganda 1	21–19	21–13		42–32	

Final Ranking

1. Tanzania
2. Kenya
3. Sudan
4. Uganda
  - Tanzania and Kenya qualified for second round of CAVB Beach Continental Cup.

==== Pool 6 ====
- Pool 6 was contested in Massawa, Eritrea.

Date	Time		Score		Set 1	Set 2	Set 3	Total	Report
17 jan		Rwanda 1	2–0	Eritrea 2	21–7	21–16		42–23	
17 Jan		Rwanda 2	2–0	Eritrea 1	21–15	21–10		42–25	
17 jan		Egypt 1	2–0	Eritrea 2	–	–		–	
17 Jan		Egypt 2	2–0	Eritrea 1	–	–		–	
18 jan		Rwanda 1	2–0	South Sudan 2	21–9	21–7		42–16	
18 Jan		Rwanda 2	2–0	South Sudan 1	21–12	21–13		42–25	
18 jan		Egypt 1	2–0	South Sudan 2	–	–		–	
18 Jan		Egypt 2	2–0	South Sudan 1	–	–		–	
19 jan		Rwanda 1	2–0	Egypt 2	21–19	21–19		42–38	
19 Jan		Rwanda 2	2–0	Egypt 1	21–19	21–8		42–27	
19 jan		South Sudan 1	2–0	Eritrea 2	21–19	21–13		42–32	
19 Jan		South Sudan 2	0–2	Eritrea 1	13–21	15–21		28–42	
		South Sudan	15–9 (GS)	Eritrea					

Final Ranking

1. Rwanda
2. Egypt
3. South Sudan
4. Eritrea
  - Rwanda and Egypt qualified for second round of CAVB Beach Continental Cup.

==== Pool 7 ====
- Pool 7 was contested in Flic-en-Flac, Mauritius.

Date	Time		Score		Set 1	Set 2	Set 3	Total	Report
15 Dec		(Mauritius) Alfred–Larose	2–0	(Seychelles) Ernesta–Marie	21–10	21–18		42–28	
15 Dec		(Mauritius) Moonisamy–Sauteur	2–0	(Seychelles) Bijoux–Lozaique	21–10	21–19		42–29	

Final Ranking

1. Mauritius
2. Seychelles
  - Mauritius qualified for second round of CAVB Beach Continental Cup.

==== Pool 8 & 9 ====
- Pool 8 & 9 was contested in Maputo, Mozambique.

Date	Time		Score		Set 1	Set 2	Set 3	Total	Report
11 Jan		Mozambique 1	2–0	Zimbabwe 2	21–7	21–5		42–12	
11 Jan		Mozambique 2	2–1	Zimbabwe 1	21–15	15–21	15–6	51–42	
11 Jan		Botswana 1	–	Swaziland 2					
11 Jan		Botswana 2	–	Swaziland 1					
12 Jan		Mozambique 1	2–0	Zambia 2	21–16	21–12		42–28	
12 Jan		Mozambique 2	2–0	Zambia 1	21–11	21–11		42–22	
12 Jan		South Africa 1	2–1	Botswana 2	21–15	15–21	15–10	51–46	
12 Jan		South Africa 2	2–0	Botswana 1	21–18	21–10		42–28	
13 Jan		Zambia 1	2–1	Zimbabwe 2	13–21	27–25	15–10	55–56	
13 Jan		Zambia 2	2–0	Zimbabwe 1	21–19	21–17		42–36	
13 Jan		Swaziland 1	0–2	South Africa 2	11–21	14–21		25–42	
13 Jan		Swaziland 2	0–2	South Africa 1	9–21	8–21		17–21	

Final Ranking
Pool 8

1. Mozambique
2. Zambia
3. Zimbabwe
  - Mozambique and Zambia qualified for second round of CAVB Beach Continental Cup.

Pool 9

1. South Africa
2. Botswana
3. Swaziland
  - South Africa and Botswana qualified for second round of CAVB Beach Continental Cup

=== Second round ===
==== Pool C ====
- Pool C was contested in Banjul, The Gambia.

Date	Time		Score		Set 1	Set 2	Set 3	Total	Report
14 Mar		The Gambia 1	2–0	South Sudan 2	21–11	21–15		42–26	
14 Mar		The Gambia 2	2–0	South Sudan 1	21–18	21–19		42–37	

Final Ranking

1. The Gambia
2. South Sudan
3. Botswana (withdraw)
4. Kenya (withdraw)
5. Mauritius (withdraw)
  - Gambia and South Sudan qualified for final round of CAVB Beach Continental Cup.

== Women ==
=== First round ===
==== Pool 3 ====
- Pool 3 was contested in Accra, Ghana.

Date	Time		Score		Set 1	Set 2	Set 3	Total	Report
3 Jan		Nigeria 1	2–0	Benin 2	21–03	21–07		42–10	
3 Jan		Nigeria 2	2–0	Benin 1	21–17	21–16		42–33	
4 Jan		Nigeria 1	2–0	Ghana 2	21–14	21–19		42–33	
4 Jan		Nigeria 2	2–0	Ghana 1	21–12	21–11		42–23	
4 Jan		Benin 1	2–0	Ghana 2	21–17	21–17		42–34	
4 Jan		Benin 2	0–2	Ghana 1	10–21	08–21		18–42	
		Ghana	18–16 (GS)	Benin					

Final Ranking

1. Nigeria
2. Ghana
3. Benin
  - Nigeria and Ghana qualified for second round of CAVB Beach Continental Cup.

==== Pool 4 ====
- Pool 4 was contested in Kinshasa, Democratic Republic of the Congo.

Date	Time		Score		Set 1	Set 2	Set 3	Total	Report
11 Jan		Democratic Republic of the Congo 1	2–0	Republic of the Congo 2	21–10	21–18		42–28	
11 Jan		Democratic Republic of the Congo 2	2–1	Republic of the Congo 1	21–23	21–10	15–9	57–42	

Final Ranking

1. Democratic Republic of the Congo
2. Republic of the Congo
  - Democratic Republic of the Congo qualified for second round of CAVB Beach Continental Cup.

==== Pool 6 ====
- Pool 6 was contested in Dar es Salaam, Tanzania.

Date	Time		Score		Set 1	Set 2	Set 3	Total	Report
10 Jan		Tanzania 1	0–2	Uganda 2	16–21	6–21		22–42	
10 Jan		Tanzania 2	0–2	Uganda 1	14–21	8–21		22–42	
10 Jan		Kenya 1	2–1	Rwanda 2	22–20	17–21	15–8	54–49	
10 Jan		Kenya 2	0–2	Rwanda 1	16–21	18–21		34–42	
		Kenya	13–15 (GS)	Rwanda					
11 Jan		Uganda 1	0–2	Rwanda 2	10–21	14–21		24–42	
11 Jan		Uganda 2	0–2	Rwanda 1	17–21	13–21		30–42	
11 Jan		Tanzania 1	0–2	Kenya 2	17–21	5–21		22–42	
11 Jan		Tanzania 2	0–2	Kenya 1	7–21	4–21		11–42	
12 Jan		Kenya 1	2–0	Uganda 2	21–7	22–20		43–27	
12 Jan		Kenya 2	2–1	Uganda 1	17–21	21–9	15–7	53–37	
12 Jan		Rwanda 1	2–0	Tanzania 2	21–4	21–5		42–9	
12 Jan		Rwanda 2	2–0	Tanzania 1	21–9	21–8		42–17	

Final Ranking

1. Rwanda
2. Kenya
3. Uganda
4. Tanzania
  - Rwanda and Kenya qualified for second round of CAVB Beach Continental Cup.

==== Pool 7 ====
- Pool 7 was contested in Massawa, Eritrea.

Date	Time		Score		Set 1	Set 2	Set 3	Total	Report
		Egypt 1	2–0	Sudan 2	21–14	21–15		42–29	
		Egypt 2	2–0	Sudan 1	21–11	21–11		42–22	
		Sudan 1	2–0	Eritrea 2	–	–		–	
		Sudan 2	2–1	Eritrea 1	–	–		–	
		Egypt 1	2–0	Eritrea 2	21–6	21–8		42–14	
		Egypt 2	2–0	Eritrea 1	21–8	21–5		42–13	
		Sudan 1	2–1	South Sudan 2	–	–		–	
		Sudan 2	2–0	South Sudan 1	–	–		–	
		Egypt 1	2–0	South Sudan 2	21–8	21–5		42–13	
		Egypt 2	2–0	South Sudan 1	21–8	21–13		42–21	
		Eritrea 1	–	South Sudan 2	–	–		–	
		Eritrea 2	–	South Sudan 1	–	–		–	

Final Ranking

1. Egypt
2. Sudan
3. Eritrea
4. South Sudan
  - Egypt and Sudan qualified for second round of CAVB Beach Continental Cup.

==== Pool 8 ====
- Pool 8 was contested in Flic-en-Flac, Mauritius.

Date	Time		Score		Set 1	Set 2	Set 3	Total	Report
15 Dec		(Mauritius) Bonne–Cousin	2–0	(Seychelles) Adeline–Nourrice	21–17	21–7		42–24	
15 Dec		(Mauritius) Chellumben–Letendrie	2–0	(Seychelles) Sauer–Songoire	21–14	21–9		42–23	

Final Ranking

1. Mauritius
2. Seychelles
  - Mauritius qualified for second round of CAVB Beach Continental Cup.

==== Pool 9 & 10 ====
- Pool 9 & 10 was contested in Maputo, Mozambique.

Date	Time		Score		Set 1	Set 2	Set 3	Total	Report
11 Jan		South Africa 1	2–0	Swaziland 2	21–11	21–5		42–16	
11 Jan		South Africa 2	2–0	Swaziland 1	21–4	21–4		42–8	
11 Jan		Zimbabwe 1	2–0	Botswana 2	21–8	21–17		42–25	
11 Jan		Zimbabwe 2	2–0	Botswana 1	21–8	21–19		42–27	
12 Jan		Mozambique 1	2–1	South Africa 2	21–19	17–21	15–12	53–52	
12 Jan		Mozambique 2	2–0	South Africa 1	21–15	21–8		42–23	
12 Jan		Botswana 1	2–0	Zambia 2	21–18	21–16		42–34	
12 Jan		Botswana 2	1–2	Zambia 1	21–13	11–21	8–15	40–49	
		Botswana	12–15 (GS)	Zambia					
13 Jan		Swaziland 1	0–2	Mozambique 2	2–21	1–21		3–42	
13 Jan		Swaziland 2	0–2	Mozambique 1	4–21	11–21		15–42	
13 Jan		Zambia 1	0–2	Zimbabwe 2	10–21	19–21		29–42	
13 Jan		Zambia 2	0–2	Zimbabwe 1	13–21	18–21		31–42	

Final Ranking
Pool 9

1. Mozambique
2. South Africa
3. Swaziland
  - Mozambique and South Africa qualified for second round of CAVB Beach Continental Cup.

Pool 10

1. Zambia
2. Zimbabwe
3. Botswana
  - Zambia and Zimbabwe qualified for second round of CAVB Beach Continental Cup.

=== Second round ===
==== Pool C ====
- Pool C was contested in Abuja, Nigeria.

Date	Time		Score		Set 1	Set 2	Set 3	Total	Report
7 Mar		Nigeria 2	2–0	Zambia 1	21–13	21–15		42–28	
7 Mar		Nigeria 1	2–0	Zambia 2	21–8	21–14		42–22	

Final Ranking

1. Nigeria
2. Zambia
3. Democratic Republic of the Congo (withdraw)
4. Cape Verde (withdraw)
5. Kenya (withdraw)
  - Nigeria and Zambia qualified for final round of CAVB Beach Continental Cup.

==== Pool D ====
- Pool D was contested in Entebbe, Uganda.

Date	Time		Score		Set 1	Set 2	Set 3	Total	Report
10 Mar		Uganda 2	1–2	Mozambique 1	21–17	12–21	6–15	39–53	
10 Mar		Mozambique 2	2–0	Uganda 1	21–8	21–10		42–18	
10 Mar		Guinea 1	2–0	Zimbabwe 2	21–10	21–15		42–25	
10 Mar		Guinea 2	0–2	Zimbabwe 1	7–21	15–21		22–42	
10 Mar		Guinea	17–15 (GS)	Zimbabwe					
10 Mar		Uganda 1	2–0	Guinea 2	21–14	21–12		42–26	
10 Mar		Uganda 2	0–2	Guinea 1	17–21	11–21		28–42	
10 Mar		Uganda	9–15 (GS)	Guinea					
10 Mar		Egypt 1	2–0	Mozambique 2	21–12	21–12		42–24	
11 Mar		Egypt 2	0–2	Mozambique 1	19–21	19–21		38–42	
11 Mar		Egypt	15–11 (GS)	Mozambique					

Final Ranking

1. Egypt
2. Mozambique
3. Guinea
4. Uganda
5. Zimbabwe
  - Egypt and Mozambique qualified for final round of CAVB Beach Continental Cup.
