= 2026 African Championships in Athletics – Women's 10,000 metres =

Women's 10,000 metres at the 2026 African Championships in Athletics
- Venue: Legon Sports Stadium
- Location: Accra, Ghana
- Dates: 15 May
- Competitors: 13 from 8 nations
- Winning time: 31:33.26

Medalists
gold medal	Diana Wanza	Kenya
silver medal	Florence Niyonkuru	Rwanda
bronze medal	Asefu Abreha	Ethiopia

The women's 10,000 metres event at the 2026 African Championships in Athletics was held on 15 May in Accra, Ghana.

== Results ==
Rank	Athlete	Nationality	Time	Notes
1st place, gold medalist(s)	Diana Wanza	Kenya	31:33.26	PB
2nd place, silver medalist(s)	Florence Niyonkuru	Rwanda	31:43.73	NR
3rd place, bronze medalist(s)	Asefu Abreha	Ethiopia	31:45.91	
4	Esther Chebet	Uganda	32:23.44	
5	Simret Berhe	Ethiopia	32:38.97	
6	Samiya Hassan Nour	Djibouti	32:50.90	
7	Rebecca Chelangat	Uganda	32:55.59	
8	Rahel Daniel	Eritrea	32:56.39	
9	Mercy Chepngeno	Kenya	32:56.89	
10	Mercy Chepkemoi	Kenya	33:26.57	
11	Karabo Mailula	South Africa	33:47.38	
12	Diana Engda	Eritrea	34:16.97	
13	Stella Mami Clement Lokhiri	South Sudan	34:39.00	
	Hamida Mussa	Tanzania	DNS	
	Transfora Mussa Ngimbuzi	Tanzania	DNS	
	Egide Ntakarutimana	Burundi	DNS	
	Francine Niyomokunzi	Burundi	DNS	
	Ziyn Ayelegn	Ethiopia	DNS	
