= Vasyl Matviychuk =

Ukrainian long-distance runner

Vasyl Matviychuk Vasyl Matviichuk
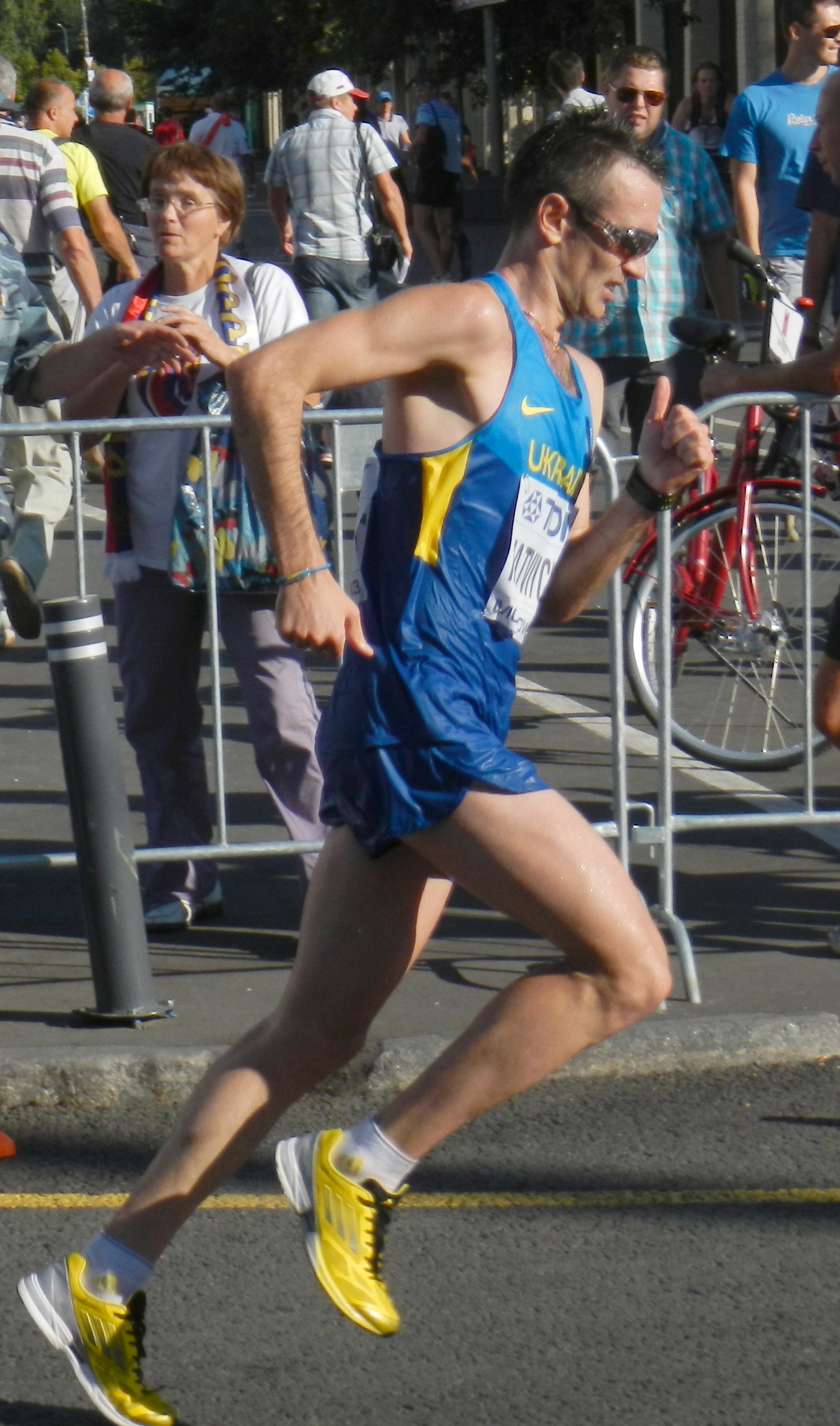
- Matviychuk at the 2013 World Championships

Personal information
- Full name: Vasyl Oleksandrovych Matviychuk
- Nationality: Ukraine
- Born: 13 January 1982 (age 44) Kamianets-Podilskyi, Ukrainian SSR, Soviet Union
- Height: 1.80 m (5 ft 11 in)
- Weight: 62 kg (137 lb)

Sport
- Sport: Athletics
- Events: 5000 m, 10,000 m half marathon, marathon
- Club: Dynamo Kolos-Khmelnytskyi

Achievements and titles
- Personal bests: 5000 m – 13:38.00 (2005); 10,000 m – 28:18.18 (2004); HM – 1:02:13 (2012); Mar – 2:10:36 (2008)

Vasyl Matviychuk or Vasyl Oleksandrovych Matviichuk (Ukrainian: Василь Олександрович Матвійчук; born 13 January 1982) is a Ukrainian long-distance runner.

== Career ==
Matviychuk is a three-time national champion for the 5000 and 10,000 metres. In 2001, he won the gold medal in the junior division at the European Cross Country Championships in Thun, Switzerland, with a time of 19 minutes and 29 seconds. He also set a personal best time of 2:10:36, by finishing fifth at the 2008 Turin Marathon.

Matviychuk represented Ukraine at the 2008 Summer Olympics in Beijing, where he competed for the men's marathon, along with his compatriots Oleksandr Kuzin and Oleksandr Sitkovskyy. He successfully finished the race in twenty-seventh place by eight seconds behind Morocco's Abderrahime Bouramdane, with a time of 2:17:50.

He was one of the subjects of the American documentary film, Spirit of the Marathon II, featuring his unsuccessful attempt to earn a spot in the Ukrainian Olympic team for the 2012 Summer Olympics at the 2012 Rome Marathon.
