= Rwanda at the 2009 World Championships in Athletics =

- WA code: RWA

in Berlin
- Competitors: 6
- Medals: Gold 0 Silver 0 Bronze 0 Total 0

World Championships in Athletics appearances
- 1983; 1987; 1991; 1993; 1995; 1997; 1999; 2001; 2003; 2005; 2007; 2009; 2011; 2013; 2015; 2017; 2019; 2022; 2023

Rwanda competed at the 2009 World Championships in Athletics from 15–23 August 2009 in Berlin.

== Team selection ==
Event	Athletes	
Event	Men	Women
5000 metres	Dieudonné Disi	
10,000 metres	Dieudonné Disi	
Marathon		Epiphanie Nyirabarame

== Results ==
=== Men ===
Event	Athletes	Heats		Final	
Event	Athletes	Result	Rank	Result	Rank
5000 m	Dieudonné Disi				
10,000 m	Dieudonné Disi				

=== Women ===
Event	Athletes	Final	
Event	Athletes	Result	Rank
Marathon	Epiphanie Nyirabarame	2:33:59 NR	26
