= Rwanda at the 1996 Summer Olympics =

- IOC code: RWA
- NOC: Comité National Olympique et Sportif du Rwanda

in Atlanta
- Competitors: 4 in 1 sport
- Flag bearer: Parfait Ntukamyagwe
- Medals: Gold 0 Silver 0 Bronze 0 Total 0

Summer Olympics appearances (overview)
- 1984; 1988; 1992; 1996; 2000; 2004; 2008; 2012; 2016; 2020; 2024

Rwanda competed at the 1996 Summer Olympics in Atlanta, United States.

== Competitors ==
The following is the list of number of competitors in the Games.

| Sport | Men | Women | Total |
|---|---|---|---|
| Athletics | 4 | 0 | 4 |
| Total | 4 | 0 | 4 |

== Results by event ==
=== Athletics ===
==== Men ====
Track and road events

| Athletes | Events | Heat Round 1 | | Heat Round 2 | | Semifinal | | Final | |
| Athletes | Events | Time | Rank | Time | Rank | Time | Rank | Time | Rank |
|---|---|---|---|---|---|---|---|---|---|
| Emmanuel Rubayiza | 400 metres | 49.20 | 54 | did not advance | | | | | |
| Alexis Sharangabo | 1500 metres | 3:46.42 | 37 | N/A | | did not advance | | | |
| Mathias Ntawulikura | 10000 metres | 27:51.69 | 3 Q | N/A | | | | 27:50.73 | 8 |
| Patrick Ishyaka | Marathon | N/A | | | | | | did not finish | |
