= Rwanda at the Olympics =

- IOC code: RWA
- NOC: Rwanda National Olympic and Sports Committee
- Website: olympicrwanda.org
- Medals: Gold 0 Silver 0 Bronze 0 Total 0

Summer appearances
- 1984; 1988; 1992; 1996; 2000; 2004; 2008; 2012; 2016; 2020; 2024; 2028

Rwanda has competed in 11 Summer Olympic Games since 1984. The nation has never competed in the Winter Olympic Games.

Rwanda has never won an Olympic medal, with its highest placement being 8th by long distance runner Mathias Ntawulikura at the men's 1000 meters event at the 1996 Summer Olympics. Meanwhile, Jean de Dieu Nkundabera won a Paralympic bronze medal for Rwanda in athletics at the 2004 Summer Paralympics in Athens.

== Medal tables ==
=== Medals by Summer Games ===
Games	Athletes	Gold	Silver	Bronze	Total	Rank
1984 Los Angeles	3	0	0	0	0	–
1988 Seoul	6	0	0	0	0	–
1992 Barcelona	10	0	0	0	0	–
1996 Atlanta	4	0	0	0	0	–
2000 Sydney	5	0	0	0	0	–
2004 Athens	5	0	0	0	0	–
2008 Beijing	4	0	0	0	0	–
2012 London	7	0	0	0	0	–
2016 Rio de Janeiro	7	0	0	0	0	–
2020 Tokyo	6	0	0	0	0	–
2024 Paris	8	0	0	0	0	–
2028 Los Angeles	future event					
2032 Brisbane	future event					
Total		0	0	0	0	–

== See also ==
- List of flag bearers for Rwanda at the Olympics
- Rwanda at the Paralympics
