= Rwanda at the 1983 World Championships in Athletics =

- Flag of Rwanda
- WA code: RWA

in Helsinki, Finland August 7–14, 1983
- Competitors: 2 (1 man and 1 woman) in 5 events
- Medals: Gold 0 Silver 0 Bronze 0 Total 0

World Championships in Athletics appearances
- 1983; 1987; 1991; 1993; 1995; 1997; 1999; 2001; 2003; 2005; 2007; 2009; 2011; 2013; 2015; 2017; 2019; 2022; 2023

Rwanda competed at the 1983 World Championships in Athletics in Helsinki, Finland, from August 7 to 14, 1983.

== Men ==
Track and road events

Athlete	Event	Heat		Quarterfinal		Semifinal		Final	
Athlete	Event	Result	Rank	Result	Rank	Result	Rank	Result	Rank
Jean-Marie Rudasinqwa	400 metres	50.52	45	Did not advance					
Jean-Marie Rudasinqwa	800 metres	1:55.12	53	—		Did not advance			
Jean-Marie Rudasinqwa	1500 metres	3:57.49	47	—		Did not advance			

== Women ==
Track and road events

Athlete	Event	Heat		Final	
Athlete	Event	Result	Rank	Result	Rank
Marcianne Mukamurenzi	1500 metres	4:30.58	18	Did not advance	
Marcianne Mukamurenzi	3000 metres	9:26.59	25	Did not advance	
