= Robert Kajuga (athlete) =

Rwandan long-distance runner (born 1985)

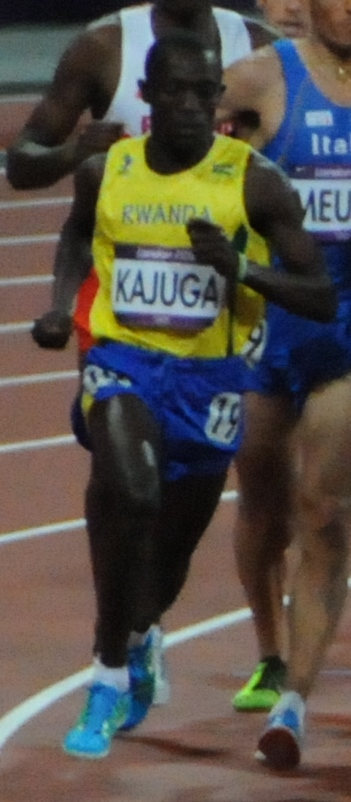
- Kajuga running the 10,000 metres at the 2012 Summer Olympics

Personal information
- Born: January 1, 1985 (age 41) Kaniga, Gicumbi District, Rwanda

Sport
- Country: Rwanda
- Sport: Track, Long-distance running
- Events: 5000 metres, 10,000 metres

Achievements and titles
- Personal bests: 5000 metres: 13:48.50; 10,000 metres: 27:56.67

Robert Kajuga (born 1 January 1985 in Kaniga, Gicumbi District) is a Rwandan long-distance track and road runner. He represented Rwanda in the 10,000 metres at the 2012 Summer Olympics.

Kajuga qualified to the 2012 Summer Olympics on July 8, 2012 when he ran the 10,000-metre at the African Senior Athletics Championship in Benin in a time of 28:03 (min:sec). After his Olympic debut, where he finished 14th, he began participating in longer-distance road races. On December 24, 2012, he won a 20-km road race in Kigali. Kajuga finished the men's race at the 2013 IAAF World Cross Country Championships in 73rd place of 96 finishers. On April 21, 2013, he ran a half-marathon in Nice, France recording a time of 1:01:37.

He was banned for four years, spanning 25 March 2016 to 2020, after refusing to submit to a doping control after a race in Kigali.

== See also ==
- Rwanda at the 2012 Summer Olympics
- List of doping cases in athletics
