= Pamela Girimbabazi =

Rwandan swimmer

Personal information
- Full name: Pamela Girimbabazi Rugabira
- Nationality: Rwanda
- Born: January 10, 1985 (age 41) Central African Republic

Sport
- Sport: Swimming

Pamela Girimbabazi Rugabira, born 10 January 1985, is an Olympic swimmer from Rwanda. She swam for Rwanda at the 2000, 2004 and 2008 Olympics; and was the country's flagbearer in 2008.

During that time, she "never had a formal swim lesson or regular coach". She was disqualified during the Sydney Games due to technical rules that she was unaware of, and subsequently taught herself the rules by consulting the Internet. Later, she also taught herself from a book about swimming belonging to fellow Rwandan swimmer Jackson Niyomugabo. She trained in a hotel pool 25 metres in length. Her personal best in the 50 metre freestyle prior to the Beijing Olympics was 35 seconds. She failed to improve on that time in Beijing, finishing third out of four in her heat, and 88th overall, with a time of 39:78.

Girimbabazi has been described as a "minor celebrity" and "an icon of pure sport spirit, an athlete who competes for the love of the game, not for the thrill of victory or the fame and riches that might follow".

== Times at the Olympics ==
- Sydney 2000, 100 metre breaststroke - DSQ
- Athens 2004, 100 metre breaststroke - 1:50.39 (48th)
- Beijing 2008, 50m freestyle - 39:78 (88th)

Olympic Games
Preceded by Mathias Ntawulikura	Flagbearer for Rwanda; Beijing 2008	Succeeded by Adrien Niyonshuti
