= Spirit of the Marathon II =

- Directed by: Jon Dunham
- Produced by: Mark Jonathan Harris; Gwendolen Twist; Jon Dunham; Megan Williams
- Starring: Cliff Scott; Domenico Anzini; Domenico "Mimmo" Scipioni; Epiphanie Nyirabarame; Julie Weiss; Vasyl Matviychuk; Ylenia Anelli
- Cinematography: Jon Dunham
- Edited by: Leonard Feinstein
- Music by: Jeff Beal
- Release date: June 12, 2013
- Country: United States
- Language: English
- Budget: $1 million

Spirit of the Marathon II is a 2013 American documentary film directed by Jon Dunham. The film is the sequel to the 2007 film Spirit of the Marathon, and chronicles the journey seven marathon runners experience leading up to competing in the 2012 Rome Marathon. It received a one-night limited release on over 600 screens in the United States on June 12, 2013.

== Synopsis ==
The focus of the film is on the seven runners participating in the Rome Marathon. Shots of the marathon are interspersed with interviews and documentary footage of the runners. Running experts who are not involved directly in the race are also interviewed. The experts include American authors Hal Higdon, Jeff Galloway, John Bingham, and Roger Robinson. American runners Bill Rodgers, Frank Shorter, Nina Kuscsik, Kathrine Switzer, Mary Wittenberg, and Rod Dixon are also interviewed. Italian runners Gelindo Bordin, Orlando Pizzolato, and Stefano Baldini are interviewed, as well as former world record holder, Ethiopian Haile Gebrselassie, British world-record holder Paula Radcliffe, and Norwegian Grete Waitz.

Cliff is a retired cross-country coach from New Jersey who always intended on running a marathon, but never found the time; after the death of his eldest son, he chose to enter the Rome Marathon. Cousins Mimmo and Domenico train together while Mimmo owns and manages "Pizzeria Il Podista" ("The Runner Pizzeria") in Rome, decorated with photos of famous Italian runners and mementos of Mimmo's running career. Epiphanie is a deeply Christian professional runner in Rwanda, who uses her earnings to help support her family, and whose life was deeply affected by the genocide in the 1990s. Julie, from Los Angeles, began running after a divorce and has completed many marathons, including qualifying for the Boston Marathon, and plans to run 52 marathons in 52 weeks hoping to raise both awareness of and $1 million in donations for the fight against pancreatic cancer, which killed her father. Vasyl is a Ukrainian professional runner who hopes to earn a slot on his country's Olympic team for the 2012 Summer Olympics. Ylenia and her husband own a small running shop in Milan, and with revenues decreasing due to competition, she finds escape in marathon training.

The night before the race, the runners all prepare in different ways. Cliff sightsees, goes to church and has a pasta dinner in a restaurant, while Domenico and Mimmo have pizza, beer, and wine at Mimmo's pizzeria. Ylenia relaxes with her family, while Vasyl and his girlfriend Olga prepare his sports drinks, numbering each with a kilometer marker and Vasyl's bib number.

During the race, Domenico and Mimmo start together, with Domenico eventually running ahead. Mimmo runs with another partner, but eventually has to pull out of the race due to a nagging ankle injury, while Domenico finishes in 4:19:57, 10th in his age group. Cliff has calf cramps, and struggles, but finishes the race in 5:02:27, collapsing at the finish with cramps. Epiphanie winds up finishing 13th, in 2:45:23, about 10 minutes behind her goal time. Julie runs with her fiancé and trainer, continually wishing to run faster, but holding back because she does not want to hit the wall. Her enthusiasm cheers up some runners (including one man who promises to marry her, in Italian), while others view her with annoyance; she finishes in 5:14:36, well behind her Boston qualifying time, set two weeks after her father's death. Vasyl runs with the lead pack for the first 35 kilometres (22 miles), but eventually falls back and finishes a disappointing 12th with a time of 2:16:47, not qualifying for the Olympic team. Ylenia enjoys the race, and finishes to the cheers of her children and husband with a time of 4:42:46.

After the race, Vasyl marries his long-time girlfriend, Olga, and begins training in the hopes of representing the Ukraine in the 2016 Summer Olympics in Rio de Janeiro. Mimmo heals up from his ankle injury, and Domenico trains for and runs in the 2013 Rome Marathon. Epiphanie returns to Rwanda, hoping to inspire other Rwandan athletes. Julie runs her 52 marathons, finishing up the series in the 2013 Los Angeles Marathon.

== Production ==
Jon Dunham chose to set the second film in Rome to emphasize the international appeal of the marathon, as well as the visual and historical appeal of Rome. He chose to focus more on the life stories of the characters, rather than the "nuts and bolts of marathon training" that the first film focused on.

== Film score ==
Jeff Beal, an Emmy award-winner film composer who scored the first film, also wrote the score for the film.

It was also scored by Rotten Tomatoes, receiving 80%.

== See also ==
- List of films about the sport of athletics
