= Jean Pierre Mvuyekure =

Rwandan long-distance runner

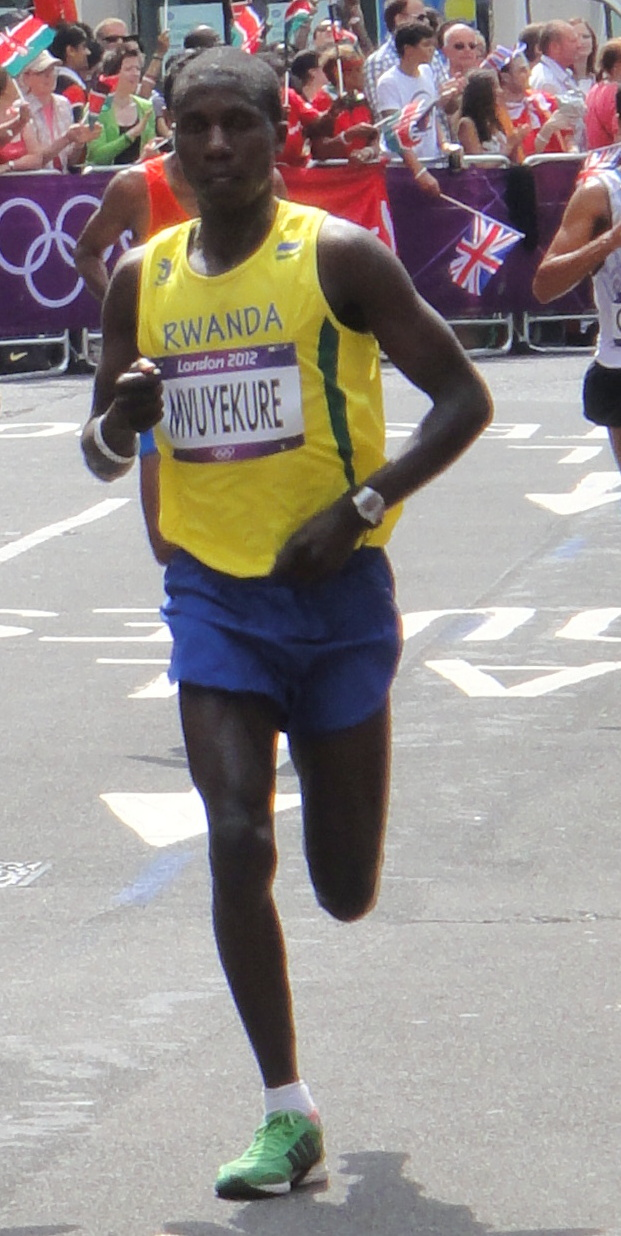
- Jean Pierre Mvuyekure in the marathon at the 2012 Olympics in London

Personal information
- Born: 28 July 1984 (age 41)
- Height: 1.58 m (5 ft 2 in)
- Weight: 54 kg (119 lb)

Sport
- Country: Rwanda
- Sport: Athletics
- Event: Marathon

Jean Pierre Mvuyekure is a Rwandan long-distance runner. At the 2012 Summer Olympics, he competed in the Men's marathon, finishing in 79th place. He emerged third at the Pyongyang Marathon in 2013.
