= Diana Wanza =

Kenyan long-distance runner

Personal information
- Nationality: Kenyan
- Born: 19 February 1999 (age 27)

Sport
- Sport: Athletics
- Events: Long-distance running, Cross country running

Achievements and titles
- Personal bests: 5000m: 15:28.91 (2026); 10,000m: 31:33.26 (2026); Half marathon: 1:03:52 (2026)
Medal record
Women's athletics
Representing Kenya
African Championships
Gold medal – first place	2026 Accra	10,000 metres
Commonwealth Games
Silver medal – second place	2026 Glasgow	10,000 metres

Diana Wanza (born 19 February 1999) is a Kenyan long-distance runner. She won the gold medal over 10,000 metres at the 2026 African Championships in Athletics and the silver medal at the 2026 Commonwealth Games.

== Biography ==
A student at Kenyatta University, Wanza ran 35:15.21 to win the gold medal in the women's 10,000 metres at the 2022 All Africa University Games. She also won over 5000 metres at the championships.

In June 2025, she had a top-ten finish over 5000 metres at the Kenyan Athletics Championships in Nairobi. In March 2026, she won the Azkoitia-Azpeitia half marathon in Spain. The following month, she won the 10,000 metres title at the Kenyan national trials and the 5000 metres at the Kip Keino Classic in a new personal best of 15:28.91. In May, she also won the 10,000 metres gold medal at the 2026 African Championships in Athletics in Accra, Ghana, running 31:33.26 to finish more than 10 seconds ahead of Rwandan Florence Niyonkuru. She was selected as part of the Kenyan team for the 2026 Commonwealth Games in Glasgow, Scotland, winning the silver medal in the 10,000 metres on 27 July. On 25 October, Wanza placed second at the Valencia half marathon, her time of 1:03:52 moving her to sixth on the world all-time list.
