= Faustin Butéra =

Rwandan sprinter

Personal information
- Nationality: Rwandan
- Born: 20 September 1955 (age 70)

Sport
- Sport: Sprinting
- Event: 400 metres
Medal record
Men's athletics
Representing Rwanda
Central African Championships
Gold medal – first place	1978 Libreville	800 m
Central African Games
Silver medal – second place	1987 Brazzaville	400 m hurdles

Faustin Butéra (born 20 September 1955) is a Rwandan sprinter. He competed in the men's 400 metres and 400 metres hurdles at the 1984 Summer Olympics.

Butéra won his first international medal at the 1978 Central African Athletics Championships in Libreville, Gabon, where he won gold in the 800 m in 1:55.5 minutes. In 1979, he set his personal best 400 m hurdles time of 53.7 seconds, which despite being faster than the Rwandan record was not ratified due to the hand timing method used. He set his 400 m best of 49.36 seconds in 1982.

Butéra qualified in both the 400 m hurdles and flat 400 m at the 1984 Olympics, which had heats scheduled on back-to-back days. On 3 August, Butéra finished 7th in his 400 m hurdles heat, running 54.36 but not qualifying for the semi-finals. His time set the Rwandan national record that still stands as of 2025. On 4 August, he returned in the 400 m, running 51.41 seconds for 8th in his heat.

Three years later at the 1987 Central African Games, Butéra entered again in the 400 m hurdles. He won the silver medal behind Jean-Pierre Abossolo-Ze, running 54.0 seconds. His time was again faster than his own national record, but it was not ratified due to the hand timing method used.

In 2012, Butéra was recognized by the Rwandan Ministry of Sport and Culture and given free entrance at all Rwandan sports events for being a top international athlete for the country.
