= Fred Yannick Uwase =

Rwandan judoka

Personal information
- Born: 16 May 1994 (age 30)
- Occupation: Judoka

Sport
- Sport: Judo

Fred Yannick Uwase (born May 16, 1994 in Paris) is a Rwandan judoka. He competed in the men's 73 kg event at the 2012 Summer Olympics and was eliminated by Bruno Mendonca in the second round.
