= Florence Niyonkuru =

Rwandan long-distance runner (born 2001)

Personal information
- Born: 2001 (age 24–25)

Sport
- Sport: Athletics
- Event: Long-distance running
Medal record
Women's athletics
Representing Rwanda
World Road Running Championships
Silver medal – second place	2026 Copenhagen	Half marathon
African Championships
Silver medal – second place	2026 Accra	10,000 metres
Commonwealth Games
Bronze medal – third place	2026 Glasgow	10,000 metres

Florence Niyonkuru (born 2001) is a Rwandan long-distance runner. She won the silver medal over 10,000 metres at the 2026 African Championships in Athletics and the bronze medal at the 2026 Commonwealth Games, the first medal won by a Rwandan athlete since the country joined the Games.

== Biography ==
In June 2025, Niyonkuru won the women's half marathon at the 20th edition of the Kigali International Peace Marathon, held on 8 June, finishing in 1:13:57. The following month, she won the 10,000 metres title at the Rwandan Championships, running 32:23.29.

In April 2026, Niyonkuru won the Elite Women's 10,000m at the TCS World 10K in Bengaluru, India. In May, she won the 10,000 metres silver medal at the 2026 African Championships in Athletics in Accra, Ghana, finishing behind Diana Wanza of Kenya. She was selected as part of the Rwanda team for the 2026 Commonwealth Games in Glasgow, Scotland, winning the country's first-ever medal at the senior edition of the Games when she took bronze at the women's 10,000 metres, behind Wanza and Rose Davies of Australia. Competing in the half marathon at the 2026 World Athletics Road Running Championships in Copenhagen, Niyonkuru won the bronze medal in 1:06:08. On 19 November, she was elevated to the silver medal following Veronica Loleo's disqualification.
