= Eric Manizabayo =

Rwandan cyclist (born 1997)

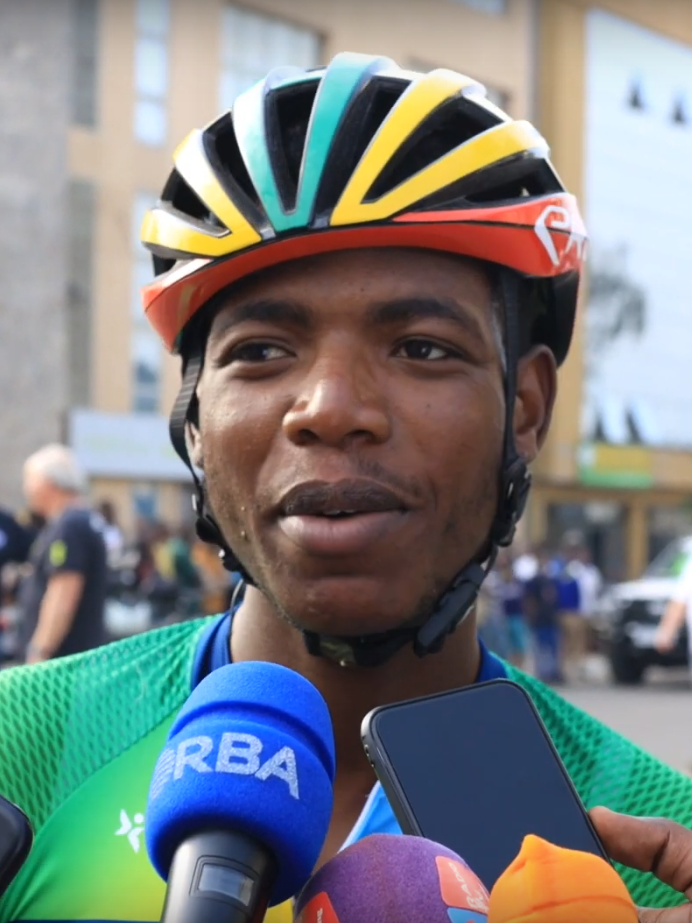

Personal information
- Born: 28 August 1997 (age 29) Jenda, Nyabihu District, Rwanda
- Height: 1.76 m (5 ft 9 in)
- Weight: 72 kg (159 lb)

Cycling career
- Sport: Cycling
- Discipline: Road
- Role: Rider

Amateur teams
- 2014–2018: Benediction Cycling Team
- 2023: Benediction Kitei Pro 2020

Professional team
- 2019–2022: Benediction–Excel Energy

Eric Manizabayo (born 28 August 1997) is a Rwandan cyclist, who last rode for Rwandan club team Benediction Kitei Pro 2020. He competed in the road race at the 2022 UCI Road World Championships, and won the 2022 Rwandan National Road Race Championships.

Manizabayo was born in the village of Jenda and dropped out of school at the age of 12 to work as a bike taxi operator. He began cycling competitively in 2015.

== Major results ==
2016
National Junior Road Championships

2nd Road race
2nd Time trial

2017
National Junior Road Championships

1st Road race
3rd Time trial

2018
2nd Team time trial, Africa Cup
2019
8th Overall Tour du Sénégal
2020
10th Overall Tour du Rwanda
2022
1st Road race, National Road Championships
9th Overall Tour du Rwanda
2023
1st Mountains classification, Tour du Cameroun
2024
10th Classique de l'Île Maurice

Olympic Games
Preceded by Alphonsine Agahozo; John Hakizimana	Flag bearer for Rwanda; Paris 2024 with Clementine Mukandanga	Succeeded by Incumbent
