= Adrien Niyonshuti =

Rwandan cyclist (born 1987)

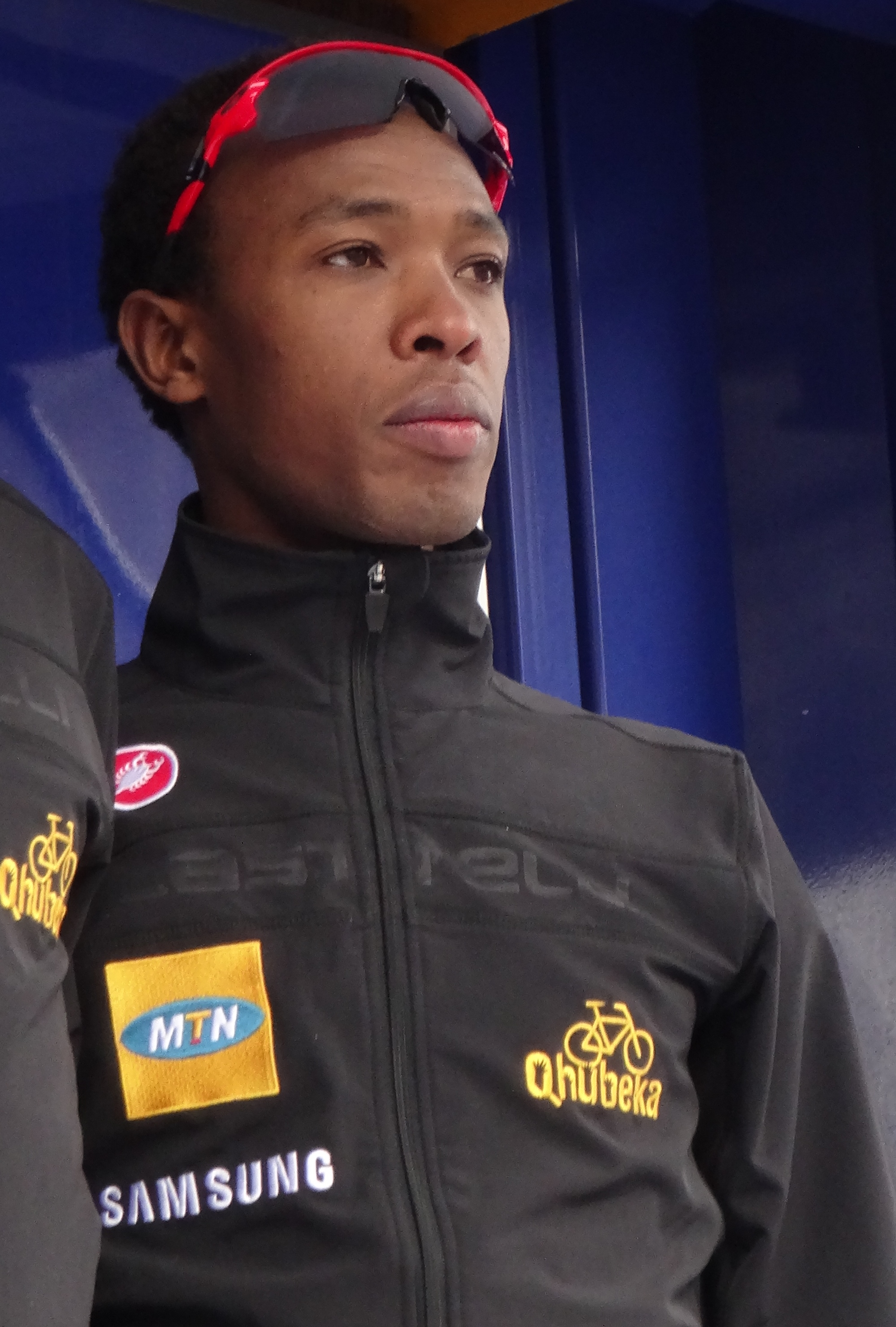
- Niyonshuti at the 2014 Four Days of Dunkirk

Personal information
- Full name: Adrien Niyonshuti
- Nickname: Manconsho
- Born: 2 January 1987 (age 39) Rwamagana, Eastern Province, Rwanda
- Height: 1.73 m (5 ft 8 in)
- Weight: 68 kg (150 lb; 10.7 st)

Cycling career
- Sport: Cycling
- Current team: National Cycling Team of Benin
- Disciplines: Road; Mountain biking
- Role: Rider (retired); Directeur sportif

Amateur team
- 2018: Sampada

Professional teams
- 2007–2008: Team Rwanda
- 2009–2017: MTN Cycling

Managerial team
- 2020–: Skol Adrien Cycling Academy

Major wins
- One-day races and Classics National Road Race Championships (2010, 2011, 2012) National Time Trial Championships (2016, 2017)

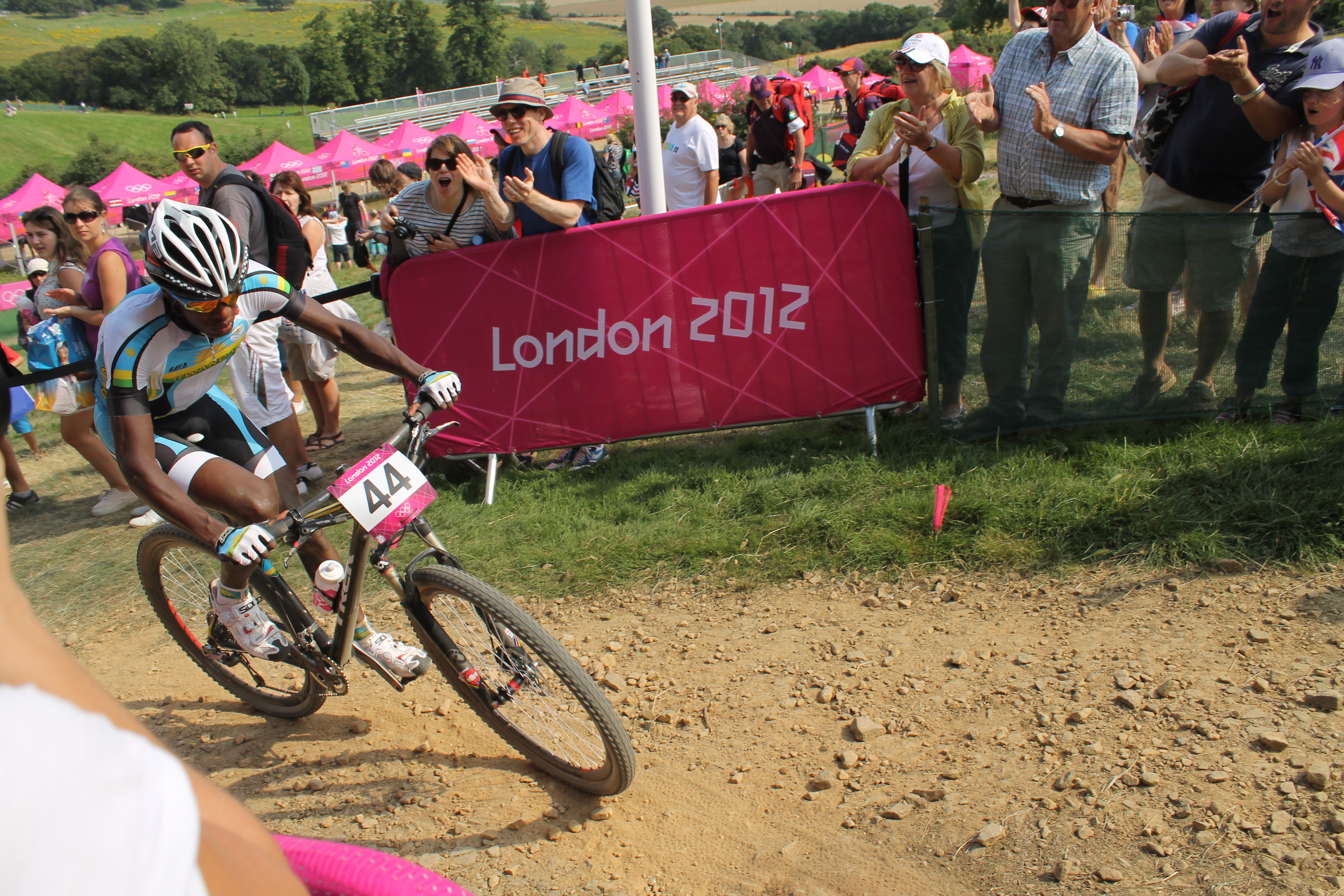
Niyonshuti at the 2012 Summer Olympics

Adrien Niyonshuti (born 2 January 1987) is a Rwandan former professional bicycle racer, who rode professionally for Team Dimension Data from 2009 to 2017. In 2021, he worked as a directeur sportif for UCI Continental team Skol Adrien Cycling Academy. In 2023, he will be leading the Benin National Cycling team to prepare for the UCI Championships to be held on the continent in 2025.

Although he survived, six of Niyonshuti's brothers were killed in the Rwandan genocide of 1994. Nilyonshuti began riding a bicycle given to him by his uncle as a teenager when he came to the attention of former professional cyclist Jacques Boyer in 2006 during the first Wooden Bike Classic.

== Career ==
Born in Rwamagana, Eastern Province, Rwanda, Niyonshuti began amateur cycling at the age of sixteen. In 2006, he came to the attention of a former professional cyclist, Jacques Boyer. The first American cyclist to compete in the Tour de France, Boyer was working in Rwanda on a project to import cargo bicycles for coffee farmers. Boyer also assumed the role of coach for the Rwandan national cycling team and recruited Niyonshuti to race. Niyonshuti had good initial results in local races such as the Tour of Rwanda, in which he finished in the top ten five years in a row and won in 2006 and 2008.

In 2008, Niyonshuti attended the Africa Continental Centre Training Camp in South Africa, where he was offered a contract by Douglas Ryder, the directeur sportif of UCI Continental Team MTN Cycling. He started his first UCI European road race in August 2009 with his participation in the Tour of Ireland, becoming the first Rwandan cyclist to ride in the European professional peloton. Niyonshuti qualified to represent Rwanda in the cross-country mountain bike race during the 2012 Summer Olympic Games in London. He was also Rwanda's flagbearer at the opening ceremony.

Niyonshuti competed for Rwanda again at the 2016 Summer Olympics in Rio de Janeiro. He did not finish the men's road race. He was the flagbearer for Rwanda again during the opening ceremony. In 2017, he was aiming to make his Grand Tour debut.

== Post-retirement and coaching activities ==
After the 2012 London Olympic Games, Niyonshuti immediately felt he wanted to offer the chance for aspiring cyclists in his country to experience the power of cycling, instil hope and pass on its positive values to future generations. The Adrien Niyonshuti Cycling Academy idea was born and the first location chosen was his home town of Rwamagana. Along with support from Team Africa Rising and the Rising from Ashes Foundation, the academy was officially launched in August 2013. The Academy ran successfully until December 31, 2022, producing two professional gravel cyclists signed by Team Amani and Eric Muhoza, who was signed for the 2023 season by Team BikeAid. Eric Muhoza is Niyonshuti's cousin. Niyonshuti closed his Academy at the end of 2022 to focus on his work developing African cyclists in Europe and as a consultant for the National Cycling Team of Benin. Niyonshuti worked as the Directeur Sportif for Team Benin A at the 2022 Tour du Benin.

On 14 July 2022, Niyonshuti was invited by the Qhubeka Charity to take part in a high-profile promotional event at the Tour de France. Qhubeka is the charity of the Tour and had planned an ascent of the iconic Alpe d'Huez on one of their single-speed Qhubeka bicycles. Niyonshuti knows the Qhubeka Charity well, having been part of a large distribution of their bicycles in 2012 and attending several distributions of Qhubeka bicycles to schoolchildren during his time on the MTN-Qhubeka/Dimension Data professional team.

Niyonshuti completed the ascent of the Alpe d'Huez in an impressive 1 hour 36 minutes, and members of the international media were waiting for him at the finish line. After interviews with leading TV, radio and print media journalists, several articles have appeared, including Cycling Tips and Outdoor Online.

== Major results ==
2004
6th Overall Tour of Rwanda
2005
7th Overall Tour of Rwanda
2007
4th Overall Tour of Rwanda
2008
1st Overall Tour of Rwanda
2009
3rd Overall Tour of Rwanda
10th Road race, African Road Championships
2010
1st Road race, National Road Championships
African Road Championships

4th Time trial
8th Road race

8th Overall Tour of Rwanda
2011
1st Road race, National Road Championships
1st Overall Tour de Kigali
5th Overall Kwita Izina Cycling Tour
6th Overall Tour of Rwanda
9th Road race, All-Africa Games
9th Time trial, African Road Championships
2012
1st Road race, National Road Championships
African Road Championships

7th Team time trial
9th Time trial
10th Road race

9th Overall Tour of Rwanda
2013
9th Overall Tour of Rwanda
2014
3rd Time trial, National Road Championships
2015
10th Time trial, African Road Championships
2016
National Road Championships

1st Time trial
2nd Road race

2017
1st Time trial, National Road Championships
2018
2nd Team time trial, African Road Championships

Olympic Games
Preceded by Pamela Girimbabazi	Flagbearer for Rwanda; London 2012; Rio de Janeiro 2016	Succeeded by Alphonsine Agahozo; John Hakizimana
