= Alphonsine Agahozo =

Rwandan swimmer (born 1997)

Personal information
- Full name: Alphonsine Agahozo
- Born: 18 October 1997 (age 28) Nyarugenge, Rwanda
- Height: 1.60 m (5 ft 3 in)
- Weight: 50 kg (110 lb)

Sport
- Country: Rwanda
- Sport: Swimming
- Event: 50 metre freestyle

Achievements and titles
- Olympic finals: London 2012 (Heats)

Alphonsine Agahozo (born 18 October 1997 in Nyarugenge, Kigali) is a Rwandan swimmer. She competed in the Women's 50m freestyle event at the 2012 Summer Olympics in London. Agahozo finished in 58th place and did not advance to the semifinals.

She competed in the women's 50 metre freestyle event at the 2020 Summer Olympics.

Olympic Games
Preceded by Adrien Niyonshuti	Flag bearer for Rwanda; Tokyo 2020 with John Hakizimana	Succeeded by Eric Manizabayo; Clementine Mukandanga
