= John Hakizimana =

Rwandan long-distance runner

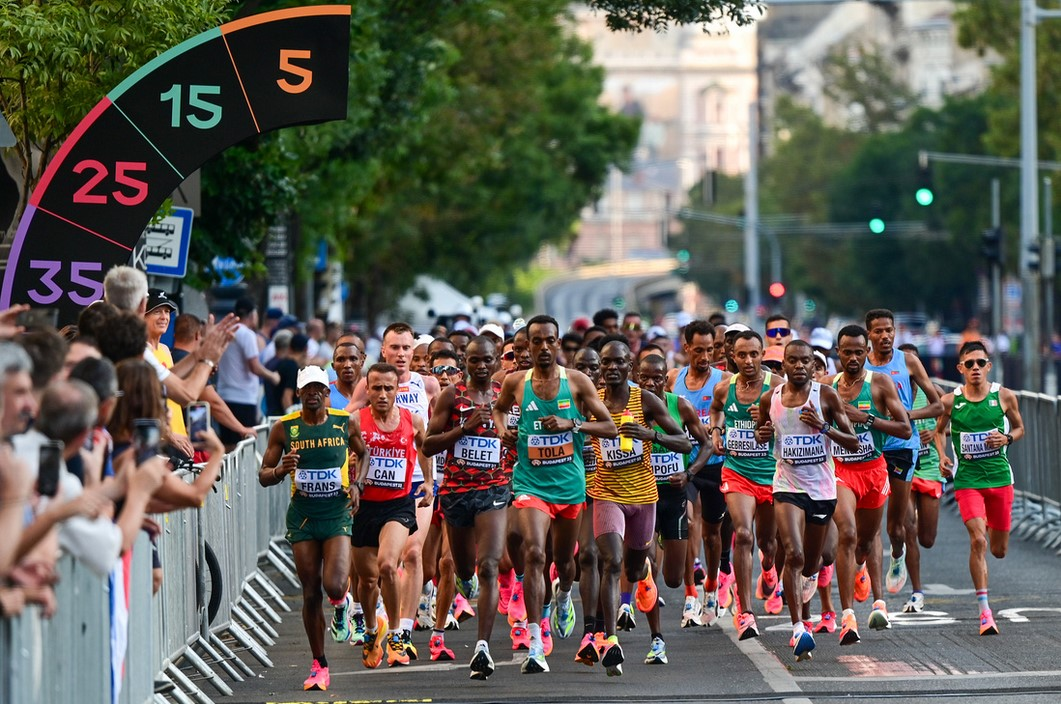
- Hakizimana (in white shirt) at the 2023 World Athletics Championships

Personal information
- Born: 26 October 1996 (age 29)

Sport
- Country: Rwanda
- Sport: Long-distance running
Medal record
Men's long-distance running
Representing Rwanda
Military World Games
Bronze medal – third place	2019 Wuhan	Marathon

John Hakizimana (born 26 October 1996) is a Rwandan long-distance runner. In 2018, he competed in the men's half marathon at the 2018 IAAF World Half Marathon Championships held in Valencia, Spain. He finished in 34th place.

In 2019, he represented Rwanda at the 2019 Military World Games held in Wuhan, China. He won the bronze medal in the men's marathon.

He represented Rwanda at the 2020 Summer Olympics in Tokyo, Japan. He competed in the men's marathon and he did not finish his race.

In November 2023, Hakizimana was issued with a two-year ban by the Athletics Integrity Unit for an anti-doping rule violation after testing positive for Triamcinolone acetonide at the 2023 World Athletics Championships after running the men's marathon. His ninth-place finish was disqualified.

Olympic Games
Preceded by Adrien Niyonshuti	Flag bearer for Rwanda; Tokyo 2020 with Alphonsine Agahozo	Succeeded by Eric Manizabayo; Clementine Mukandanga
