= Claudette Mukasakindi =

Rwandan long-distance runner (born 1982)

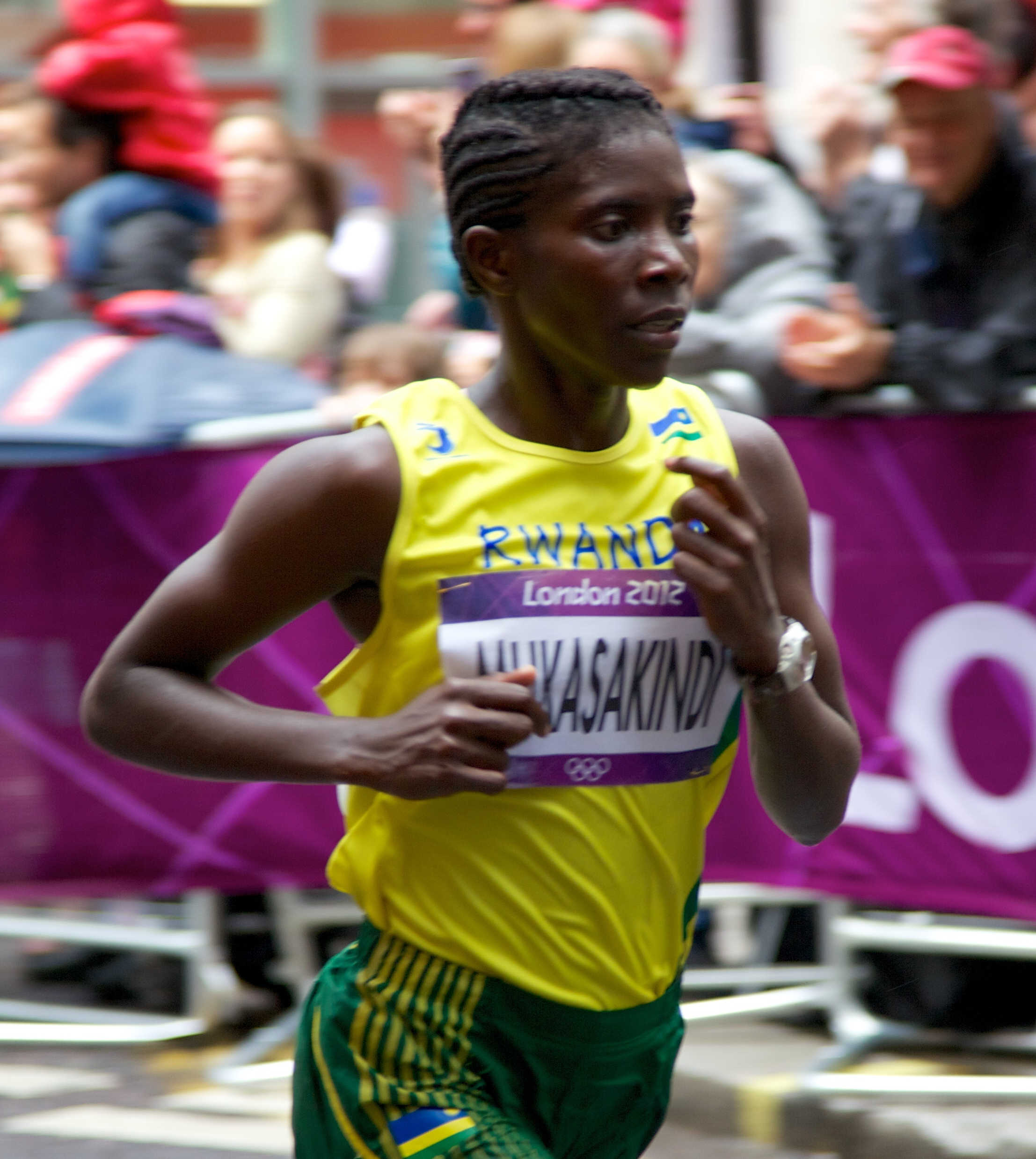

Personal information
- Born: December 25, 1982 (age 43)
- Height: 1.60 m (5 ft 3 in)
- Weight: 50 kg (110 lb)

Sport
- Country: Rwanda
- Sport: Athletics
- Event: Marathon

Claudette Mukasakindi (born 25 December 1982 in Nyarugenge) is a Rwandan long-distance runner. She competed in the marathon at the 2012 Summer Olympics, placing 101st with a time of 2:51:07. At the 2014 Commonwealth Games, she finished 11th in the women's 10000 m.

She competed for Rwanda at the 2016 Summer Olympics in the women's marathon. She placed 126th with a time of 3:05.57. She was the flag bearer for Rwanda during the closing ceremony.

== Career ==
Mukasakindi had her best year in 2012, winning the Cagliari Marathon in May, with a personal best time of 2:40:18. This performance was within the time required by the IAAF for qualification for the 2012 Olympic Games, but Mukasakindi's bid to appear at the Games was initially rejected on the grounds that the Cagliari event was not an eligible race for qualification. In the end, however, she was permitted to run, and finished 101st in the event, with a time of 2:51:07.

In the 2016 Olympic Games in Rio de Janeiro, Mukasakindi again competed in the women's marathon, one of seven Rwandans to compete in the games. She hoped to improve on her performance in London, and spent significant time preparing in Kenya and Italy, as well as in her homeland. Despite this training, her performance in the event was poor. Mukasakindi finished 126th in the race, out of a field of 133, and posted her worst competitive time at 3:05:57. She blamed the result on an ankle injury she had sustained in training, three days before the event; she had not thought it a problem before the race, but the ankle began causing her problems 21 kilometres (13 mi) into the race, worsening after 25 kilometres (16 mi). She continued to finish the race, but cited the injury as the major reason for her poor performance.
