= Félicien Muhitira =

Rwandan long-distance runner

Personal information
- Born: 4 November 1994 (age 30) Gashora, Bugesera, Rwanda

Sport
- Sport: Track and field
- Event(s): 5000 m, 10,000 m

Félicien Muhitira (born 4 November 1994) is a Rwandan long-distance runner. He competed in the 5000 metres at the 2015 World Championships in Beijing without qualifying for the final.

== International competitions ==
Year	Competition	Venue	Position	Event	Notes
Representing Rwanda
2013	African Junior Championships	Bambous, Mauritius	5th	10,000 m	29:31.6
2014	World Half Marathon Championships	Copenhagen, Denmark	41st	Half marathon	1:02:31
2014	Commonwealth Games	Glasgow, United Kingdom	10th	10,000 m	28:17.07
2015	World Championships	Beijing, China	35th (h)	5000 m	14:11.12
2015	African Games	Brazzaville, Republic of the Congo	9th	10,000 m	29:00.23
2019	World Championships	Doha, Qatar	22nd	Marathon	2:16:21
2023	World Championships	Budapest, Hungary	–	Marathon	DNF

== Personal bests ==
Outdoor

- 5000 metres – 14:11.12 (Beijing 2015)
- 10,000 metres – 28:17.07 (Glasgow 2014)
- Half marathon – 1:02:31 (Copenhagen 2014)
