= Clementine Mukandanga =

Rwandan athlete (born 1985)

Personal information
- Nationality: Rwandan
- Born: 8 December 1985 (age 40) Ngoma District, Rwanda

Sport
- Sport: Athletics
- Event: Marathon

Achievements and titles
- Personal best(s): Marathon: 2:25:54 (Firenze, 2023)

Clementine Mukandanga (born 8 December 1985) is a Rwandan marathon runner.

== Career ==
In 2014, she ran a personal best time at the 2014 Commonwealth Games of 34:12:31 as she finished tenth in the 10000m women's final in Glasgow. Mukandanga won the 5-km athletics competition known as the 'Christmas Run' held at the Amahoro National Stadium in December 2014.

Mukandanga finished sixth in the 10,000 metres at the 2015 African Games in Republic of the Congo. She competed at the 2016 Africa Athletics Senior Championship in Durban, where she finished seventh in the 10,000 metres race and met the qualifying standard for the 2016 Summer Olympics with her performance. In 2017, she won the Rwanda 10 km cross country title in Kicukiro.

In 2018, she finished third at the Firenze Marathon and met the qualifying standard for the World Championships, running 2:30:50. She competed in Doha at the 2019 World Athletics Championships. In 2020, she won the Varma Marathon in Bulgaria in 2:35:14.

Mukandanga set a personal best of 2:25:54 to win the Firenze Marathon in November 2023. This was two minutes faster than her previous personal best from the year before, also set in Firenze, where she finished in third place.

== Personal life ==
Mukandanga is based in Siena, Italy.

Olympic Games
Preceded by Alphonsine Agahozo; John Hakizimana	Flag bearer for Rwanda; Paris 2024 with Eric Manizabayo	Succeeded by Incumbent
