= Marcianne Mukamurenzi =

Rwandan long-distance runner

Personal information
- Born: 11 November 1959 (age 66)
- Height: 1.56 m (5 ft 1 in)
- Weight: 51 kg (112 lb)

Sport
- Country: Rwanda

Achievements and titles
- Personal bests: 1500 m: 4:24.75; 3000 m: 8:59.90 (NR); 10,000 m: 32:27.90; Marathon: 2:36:53
Medal record
Women's athletics
Representing Rwanda
All-Africa Games
Silver medal – second place	1987 Nairobi	10,000 m
African Championships
Gold medal – first place	1988 Annaba	10,000 m
Bronze medal – third place	1989 Lagos	10,000 m
Jeux de la Francophonie
Gold medal – first place	1989 Rabat	10,000 m
Silver medal – second place	1989 Rabat	3000 m

Marcianne Mukamurenzi (born 11 November 1959) is a Rwandan former long-distance runner. She won gold and bronze medals in 10,000 metres at the 1988 and 1989 African Championships in Athletics. She also competed for Rwanda in the 1984, 1988 and 1992 Summer Olympics, never progressing to the finals. She was the first woman to represent Rwanda at the Olympics. In 1991 she set the current Rwandan record in women's 3000 metres with the time of 8:59.90.

== Achievements ==
Year	Competition	Venue	Position	Event	Notes
1984	Olympic Games	Los Angeles, United States	20th (h)	1500 m	4:31.56
1984	Olympic Games	Los Angeles, United States	23rd (h)	3000 m	9:27.08
1987	All-Africa Games	Nairobi, Kenya	2nd	10,000 m	33:58.55
1987	World Championships	Rome, Italy	27th	Marathon	2:49:38
1988	African Championships	Annaba, Algeria	1st	10,000 m	33:03.98
1988	Olympic Games	Seoul, South Korea	38th	Marathon	2:40:12
1989	Jeux de la Francophonie	Rabat, Morocco	2nd	3000 m	9:10.71
1989	Jeux de la Francophonie	Rabat, Morocco	1st	10,000 m	34:18.84
1989	African Championships	Lagos, Nigeria	3rd	10,000 m	34:09.48
1990	World Cross Country Championships	Aix-les-Bains, France	19th	Senior race (6 km)	19:59
1991	World Cross Country Championships	Antwerp, Belgium	10th	Senior race (6.4 km)	20:57
1992	Olympic Games	Barcelona, Spain	24th (h)	10,000 m	33:00.66
(h) Indicates overall position in the qualifying heats
