= Épiphanie Nyirabaramé =

Rwandan long-distance runner

Épiphanie Nyirabaramé (born 15 December 1981, in Butare) is a Rwandan athlete who specialized in marathon and long-distance running. She represented Rwanda at two Olympic games (2004 in Athens, and 2008 in Beijing).

Nyirabaramé first competed at the 2004 Summer Olympics in Athens, where she finished fifty-fourth and completed the run in the women's marathon, with a time of 2:52:50. At her second Olympics in Beijing, on the other hand, she finished the women's marathon, just seven seconds behind Slovakia's Zuzana Šaríková, with her best possible time of 2:49:32.

Nyirabaramé achieved her personal best at the 2009 IAAF World Championships in Berlin, Germany, when she completed the run in the women's marathon, finishing in twenty-sixth place, with a time of 2:33:59. In addition to her personal best, Nyirabaramé also set her national record, which was previously held by Marcianna Mukamurenzi in the 1990s.

Nyirabaramé was featured in the American documentary film, Spirit of the Marathon II, featuring her performance in the 2012 Rome Marathon.
