= Mathias Ntawulikura =

Rwandan long-distance runner

Mathias Ntawulikura (born 14 June 1964 in Gisovu/Karongi) is a retired Rwandan long-distance runner. He reached the World Athletics Championships final and participated in the Olympic Games in the 5000 metres (1988) and 10,000 metres (1992, 1996) and marathon (2000, 2004). He also participated five times in the IAAF World Cross Country Championships.

His best Olympic performance was 8th in the 10,000 m at the 1996 Atlanta Olympics, a race where the top eight positions were taken by (six) African countries. It is the best position by any Rwandan athlete in the Olympic history. He was forty when he competed in the marathon at the 2004 Athens Olympics; of the hundred men who started the race, he came 62nd with a time of 2hours, 26 minutes, 5 seconds.

He is the first (and as of 2010, only) Rwandan to compete at five Olympic Games. The only African to compete in five Olympics before him was Egyptian shooter Mohamed Khorshed. In 2004, Ntawulikura joined three other track and field athletes - Nigerian Mary Onyali, Mozambican Maria Mutola, and Angolan João N'Tyamba in becoming the second African to compete at five Olympics.

He was affiliated with the Pro Patria Milano sporting club in Italy.

== International competitions ==
Year	Competition	Venue	Position	Event	Notes
Representing Rwanda
1991	World Indoor Championships	Seville, Spain	7th	3000 m	
1991	World Championships	Tokyo, Japan	7th	10,000 m	
1992	World Cross Country Championships	Boston, United States	13th	Long race	
1993	World Championships	Stuttgart, Germany	10th	5000 m	13:28.58
1995	World Championships	Gothenburg, Sweden	15th	10,000 m	
1996	Olympic Games	Atlanta, United States	8th	10,000 m	
2000	London Marathon	London, United Kingdom	7th	Marathon	2:09:55
2000	Olympic Games	Sydney, Australia	15th	Marathon	2:16:39
2001	World Championships	Edmonton, Canada	—	Marathon	DNF
2003	World Championships	Paris, France	49th	Marathon	2:18:44
2004	Olympic Games	Athens, Greece	62nd	Marathon	2:26:05

== Personal bests ==
- 3000 metres - 7:43.09 min (1995)
- 5000 metres - 13:11.29 min (1992)
- 10,000 metres - 27:25.48 min (1996)
- Half marathon - 1:01:41 hrs (2000)
- Marathon - 2:09:55 hrs (2000)

== See also ==
- List of athletes with the most appearances at Olympic Games

Olympic Games
Preceded by Pierre Karemera	Flagbearer for Rwanda; Athens 2004	Succeeded by Pamela Girimbabazi Rugabira
