= Rwanda National Olympic and Sports Committee =

National Olympic Committee

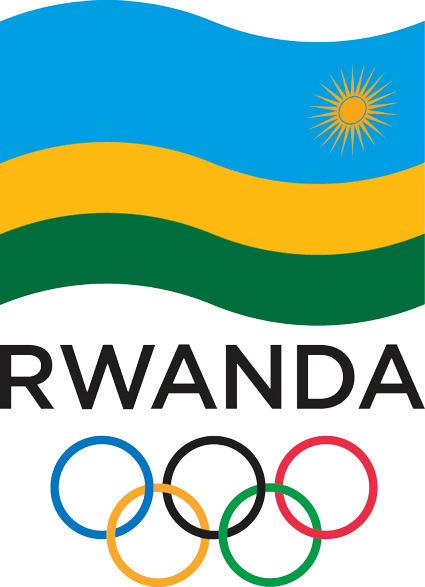
- Country/Region: Rwanda
- Code: RWA
- Recognized: 1984
- Continental Association: ANOCA
- Headquarters: Kigali, Rwanda
- President: Felecite Rwemarika
- Secretary General: Alexis Sharangabo
- Website: olympicrwanda.org

The Rwanda National Olympic and Sports Committee (French: Comité National Olympique et Sportif du Rwanda) (IOC code: RWA) is the National Olympic Committee representing Rwanda.

== See also ==
- Rwanda at the Olympics
- Rwanda at the Commonwealth Games
