= 2020 Tour du Rwanda =

2020 UCI Africa Tour
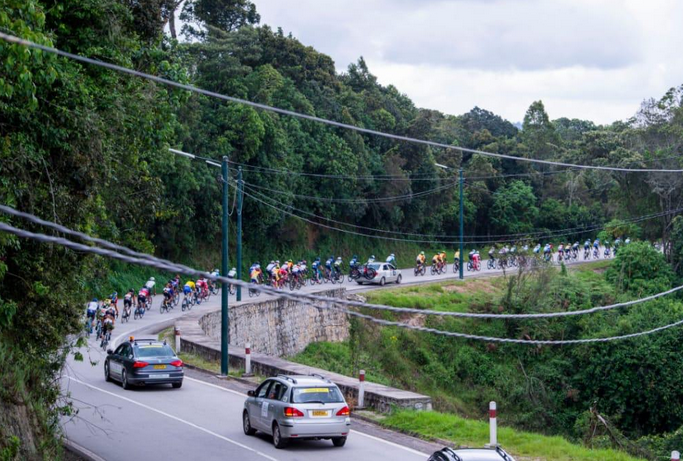
- Stage 3 of the 2020 Tour du Rwanda

Race details
- Dates: 23 February – 1 March 2020
- Stages: 8
- Distance: 889.0 km (552.4 mi)
- Winning time: 23h 13' 01"

Results
Jersey awarded to the overall winner	Winner	Natnael Tesfatsion (ERI)	(Eritrea)
	Second	Moise Mugisha (RWA)	(Skol Adrien Cycling Academy)
	Third	~~Patrick Schelling~~ Kent Main (RSA)	(ProTouch)
Jersey awarded to the mountains classification winner	Mountains	Rein Taaramäe (EST)	(Total Direct Énergie)
Jersey awarded to the young rider classification winner	Young rider	Natnael Tesfatsion (ERI)	(Eritrea)
Jersey awarded to the sprints classification winner	Sprints	Dawit Yemane (ERI)	(Eritrea)
Jersey awarded to the team classification winner	Team	Androni Giocattoli–Sidermec	

The 2020 Tour du Rwanda was a road cycling stage race that took place in Rwanda between 23 February and 1 March 2020. The race was rated as a 2.1 event as part of the 2020 UCI Africa Tour, and was the 23rd edition of the Tour du Rwanda.

Natnael Tesfatsion, riding for the Eritrean national team, won the race by almost a minute ahead of Rwandan rider Moise Mugisha of the Skol Adrien Cycling Academy. Swiss rider Patrick Schelling of Israel Start-Up Nation originally finished third, but it was revealed in September 2020 that he had tested positive for use of terbutaline, an unauthorized asthma drug, on stage 2 on 24 February. As a result of the 'non-intentional anti-doping rule violation,' Schelling was stripped of his results from this race and was handed a four-month suspension that retroactively began on 18 May 2020. Due to Schelling's suspension, South African rider Kent Main of ProTouch was elevated to third place.

== Teams ==
Sixteen teams were invited to the race, of which one was a UCI WorldTeam, four were UCI ProTeams, eight were UCI Continental teams, and three were national teams. Each team entered five riders into the race for a total of 80 riders, of which 58 finished the race.

UCI WorldTeams

- Israel Start-Up Nation

UCI ProTeams

- Androni Giocattoli–Sidermec
- Nippo–Delko–One Provence
- Team Novo Nordisk
- Total Direct Énergie

UCI Continental Teams

- BAI–Sicasal–Petro de Luanda
- Benediction Ignite
- Bike Aid
- Groupement Sportif des Pétroliers
- ProTouch
- Skol Adrien Cycling Academy
- Terengganu Inc. TSG
- Vino–Astana Motors

National Teams

- Eritrea
- Ethiopia
- Rwanda

== Route ==
Stage characteristics and winners
Stage	Date	Course	Distance	Type	Stage winner
1	February 23	Kigali (Kigali Arena) to Kigali (Kimironko)	114.4 km (71.1 mi)	Hilly stage	Yevgeniy Fedorov (KAZ)
2	February 24	Kigali (MIC Building) to Huye	120.5 km (74.9 mi)	Hilly stage	Mulu Hailemichael (ETH)
3	February 25	Huye to Rusizi	142 km (88 mi)	Hilly stage	Jhonatan Restrepo (COL)
4	February 26	Rusizi to Rubavu	206.3 km (128.2 mi)	Mountain stage	Natnael Tesfatsion (ERI)
5	February 27	Rubavu to Musanze	84.7 km (52.6 mi)	Hilly stage	Jhonatan Restrepo (COL)
6	February 28	Musanze to Muhanga	127.3 km (79.1 mi)	Mountain stage	Jhonatan Restrepo (COL)
7	February 29	Kigali (Nyamirambo) to Kigali (Mur de Kigali)	4.5 km (2.8 mi)	Individual time trial	Jhonatan Restrepo (COL)
8	March 1	Kigali (PSF Expo Ground) to Kigali (Rebero)	89.3 km (55.5 mi)	Mountain stage	José Manuel Díaz (ESP)
Total		889.0 km (552.4 mi)			

== Stages ==
=== Stage 1 ===
23 February 2020 — Kigali (Kigali Arena) to Kigali (Kimironko), 114.4 km (71.1 mi)

Stage 1 Result
Rank	Rider	Team	Time
1	Yevgeniy Fedorov (KAZ)	Vino–Astana Motors	2h 44' 59"
2	Henok Mulubrhan (ERI)	Eritrea	+ 15"
3	Biniam Girmay (ERI)	Nippo–Delko–One Provence	+ 18"
4	Carlos Quintero (COL)	Terengganu Inc. TSG	+ 20"
5	Patrick Byukusenge (RWA)	Benediction Ignite	+ 21"
DSQ	~~Patrick Schelling~~ (SUI)	~~Israel Start-Up Nation~~	~~+ 26"~~
6	Natnael Tesfatsion (ERI)	Eritrea	+ 26"
7	Joseph Areruya (RWA)	Rwanda	+ 26"
8	Kent Main (RSA)	ProTouch	+ 29"
9	Daniel Muñoz (COL)	Androni Giocattoli–Sidermec	+ 29"
10	Edwin Ávila (COL)	Israel Start-Up Nation	+ 29"

General classification after Stage 1
Rank	Rider	Team	Time
1	Yevgeniy Fedorov (KAZ)	Vino–Astana Motors	2h 44' 59"
2	Henok Mulubrhan (ERI)	Eritrea	+ 15"
3	Biniam Girmay (ERI)	Nippo–Delko–One Provence	+ 18"
4	Carlos Quintero (COL)	Terengganu Inc. TSG	+ 20"
5	Patrick Byukusenge (RWA)	Benediction Ignite	+ 21"
DSQ	~~Patrick Schelling~~ (SUI)	~~Israel Start-Up Nation~~	~~+ 26"~~
6	Natnael Tesfatsion (ERI)	Eritrea	+ 26"
7	Joseph Areruya (RWA)	Rwanda	+ 26"
8	Kent Main (RSA)	ProTouch	+ 29"
9	Daniel Muñoz (COL)	Androni Giocattoli–Sidermec	+ 29"
10	Edwin Ávila (COL)	Israel Start-Up Nation	+ 29"

=== Stage 2 ===
24 February 2020 — Kigali (MIC Building) to Huye, 120.5 km (74.9 mi)

Stage 2 Result
Rank	Rider	Team	Time
1	Mulu Hailemichael (ETH)	Nippo–Delko–One Provence	2h 30' 42"
2	Jhonatan Restrepo (COL)	Androni Giocattoli–Sidermec	+ 0"
3	Biniam Girmay (ERI)	Nippo–Delko–One Provence	+ 0"
4	Didier Munyaneza (RWA)	Benediction Ignite	+ 0"
5	Sirak Tesfom (ERI)	Eritrea	+ 0"
6	Mekseb Debesay (ERI)	Bike Aid	+ 0"
7	Natnael Tesfatsion (ERI)	Eritrea	+ 0"
8	Romain Cardis (FRA)	Total Direct Énergie	+ 0"
9	Joseph Areruya (RWA)	Rwanda	+ 0"
10	Metkel Eyob (ERI)	Terengganu Inc. TSG	+ 0"

General classification after Stage 2
Rank	Rider	Team	Time
1	Yevgeniy Fedorov (KAZ)	Vino–Astana Motors	5h 48' 20"
2	Henok Mulubrhan (ERI)	Eritrea	+ 15"
3	Biniam Girmay (ERI)	Nippo–Delko–One Provence	+ 18"
4	Carlos Quintero (COL)	Terengganu Inc. TSG	+ 20"
5	Patrick Byukusenge (RWA)	Benediction Ignite	+ 21"
6	Natnael Tesfatsion (ERI)	Eritrea	+ 26"
7	Joseph Areruya (RWA)	Rwanda	+ 26"
DSQ	~~Patrick Schelling~~ (SUI)	~~Israel Start-Up Nation~~	~~+ 26"~~
8	Mulu Hailemichael (ETH)	Nippo–Delko–One Provence	+ 29"
9	Mekseb Debesay (ERI)	Bike Aid	+ 29"
10	Kent Main (RSA)	ProTouch	+ 29"

=== Stage 3 ===
25 February 2020 — Huye to Rusizi, 142 km (88 mi)

Stage 3 Result
Rank	Rider	Team	Time
1	Jhonatan Restrepo (COL)	Androni Giocattoli–Sidermec	3h 47' 39"
2	Biniam Girmay (ERI)	Nippo–Delko–One Provence	+ 1"
3	Henok Mulubrhan (ERI)	Eritrea	+ 9"
4	Natnael Tesfatsion (ERI)	Eritrea	+ 11"
5	José Manuel Díaz (ESP)	Nippo–Delko–One Provence	+ 11"
DSQ	~~Patrick Schelling~~ (SUI)	~~Israel Start-Up Nation~~	~~+ 11"~~
6	Carlos Quintero (COL)	Terengganu Inc. TSG	+ 11"
7	Daniel Muñoz (COL)	Androni Giocattoli–Sidermec	+ 20"
8	Awet Gebremedhin (SWE)	Israel Start-Up Nation	+ 28"
9	Dawit Yemane (ERI)	Eritrea	+ 51"
10	Davide Gabburo (ITA)	Androni Giocattoli–Sidermec	+ 51"

General classification after Stage 3
Rank	Rider	Team	Time
1	Biniam Girmay (ERI)	Nippo–Delko–One Provence	9h 36' 18"
2	Henok Mulubrhan (ERI)	Eritrea	+ 5"
3	Carlos Quintero (COL)	Terengganu Inc. TSG	+ 12"
4	Natnael Tesfatsion (ERI)	Eritrea	+ 18"
DSQ	~~Patrick Schelling~~ (SUI)	~~Israel Start-Up Nation~~	~~+ 18"~~
5	Daniel Muñoz (COL)	Androni Giocattoli–Sidermec	+ 30"
6	Awet Gebremedhin (SWE)	Israel Start-Up Nation	+ 38"
7	José Manuel Díaz (ESP)	Nippo–Delko–One Provence	+ 38"
8	Jhonatan Restrepo (COL)	Androni Giocattoli–Sidermec	+ 53"
9	Dawit Yemane (ERI)	Eritrea	+ 1' 01"
10	Mulu Hailemichael (ETH)	Nippo–Delko–One Provence	+ 1' 04"

=== Stage 4 ===
26 February 2020 — Rusizi to Rubavu, 206.3 km (128.2 mi)

Stage 4 Result
Rank	Rider	Team	Time
1	Natnael Tesfatsion (ERI)	Eritrea	5h 34' 46"
2	Kent Main (RSA)	ProTouch	+ 1"
3	Moise Mugisha (RWA)	Skol Adrien Cycling Academy	+ 8"
4	Hendrik Kruger (RSA)	ProTouch	+ 2' 24"
5	Grigoriy Shtein (KAZ)	Vino–Astana Motors	+ 2' 24"
6	Simone Ravanelli (ITA)	Androni Giocattoli–Sidermec	+ 2' 24"
7	Eric Manizabayo (RWA)	Benediction Ignite	+ 2' 24"
8	Joseph Areruya (RWA)	Rwanda	+ 2' 26"
9	Temesgen Buru (ETH)	Ethiopia	+ 2' 29"
10	Davide Gabburo (ITA)	Androni Giocattoli–Sidermec	+ 4' 56"

General classification after Stage 4
Rank	Rider	Team	Time
1	Natnael Tesfatsion (ERI)	Eritrea	15h 11' 22"
2	Moise Mugisha (RWA)	Skol Adrien Cycling Academy	+ 2' 11"
3	Kent Main (RSA)	ProTouch	+ 3' 15"
4	Simone Ravanelli (ITA)	Androni Giocattoli–Sidermec	+ 3' 44"
5	Joseph Areruya (RWA)	Rwanda	+ 3' 46"
6	Biniam Girmay (ERI)	Nippo–Delko–One Provence	+ 4' 41"
7	Henok Mulubrhan (ERI)	Eritrea	+ 4' 46"
8	Carlos Quintero (COL)	Terengganu Inc. TSG	+ 4' 53"
DSQ	~~Patrick Schelling~~ (SUI)	~~Israel Start-Up Nation~~	~~+ 4' 56"~~
9	Daniel Muñoz (COL)	Androni Giocattoli–Sidermec	+ 5' 11"
10	Awet Gebremedhin (SWE)	Israel Start-Up Nation	+ 5' 23"

=== Stage 5 ===
27 February 2020 — Rubavu to Musanze, 84.7 km (52.6 mi)

Stage 5 Result
Rank	Rider	Team	Time
1	Jhonatan Restrepo (COL)	Androni Giocattoli–Sidermec	2h 08' 19"
2	Romain Cardis (FRA)	Total Direct Énergie	+ 0"
3	Natnael Tesfatsion (ERI)	Eritrea	+ 0"
4	Henok Mulubrhan (ERI)	Eritrea	+ 0"
5	Pim Ligthart (NED)	Total Direct Énergie	+ 0"
6	Biniam Girmay (ERI)	Nippo–Delko–One Provence	+ 0"
7	Nikodemus Holler (GER)	Bike Aid	+ 0"
8	Awet Gebremedhin (SWE)	Israel Start-Up Nation	+ 0"
DSQ	~~Patrick Schelling~~ (SUI)	~~Israel Start-Up Nation~~	~~+ 0"~~
9	Mekseb Debesay (ERI)	Bike Aid	+ 0"
10	David Lozano (ESP)	Team Novo Nordisk	+ 0"

General classification after Stage 5
Rank	Rider	Team	Time
1	Natnael Tesfatsion (ERI)	Eritrea	17h 19' 41"
2	Moise Mugisha (RWA)	Skol Adrien Cycling Academy	+ 2' 11"
3	Kent Main (RSA)	ProTouch	+ 3' 22"
4	Simone Ravanelli (ITA)	Androni Giocattoli–Sidermec	+ 3' 51"
5	Joseph Areruya (RWA)	Rwanda	+ 3' 53"
6	Biniam Girmay (ERI)	Nippo–Delko–One Provence	+ 4' 41"
7	Henok Mulubrhan (ERI)	Eritrea	+ 4' 46"
8	Carlos Quintero (COL)	Terengganu Inc. TSG	+ 4' 53"
DSQ	~~Patrick Schelling~~ (SUI)	~~Israel Start-Up Nation~~	~~+ 4' 56"~~
9	Daniel Muñoz (COL)	Androni Giocattoli–Sidermec	+ 5' 18"
10	Awet Gebremedhin (SWE)	Israel Start-Up Nation	+ 5' 23"

=== Stage 6 ===
28 February 2020 — Musanze to Muhanga, 127.3 km (79.1 mi)

Stage 6 Result
Rank	Rider	Team	Time
1	Jhonatan Restrepo (COL)	Androni Giocattoli–Sidermec	3h 09' 32"
DSQ	~~Patrick Schelling~~ (SUI)	~~Israel Start-Up Nation~~	~~+ 0"~~
2	Carlos Quintero (COL)	Terengganu Inc. TSG	+ 0"
3	José Manuel Díaz (ESP)	Nippo–Delko–One Provence	+ 1' 27"
4	Awet Gebremedhin (SWE)	Israel Start-Up Nation	+ 1' 27"
5	Simone Ravanelli (ITA)	Androni Giocattoli–Sidermec	+ 1' 27"
6	Mulu Hailemichael (ETH)	Nippo–Delko–One Provence	+ 1' 27"
7	Moise Mugisha (RWA)	Skol Adrien Cycling Academy	+ 1' 43"
8	Kent Main (RSA)	ProTouch	+ 1' 45"
9	Grigoriy Shtein (KAZ)	Vino–Astana Motors	+ 2' 35"
10	Eric Manizabayo (RWA)	Benediction Ignite	+ 2' 43"

General classification after Stage 6
Rank	Rider	Team	Time
1	Natnael Tesfatsion (ERI)	Eritrea	20h 31' 59"
2	Moise Mugisha (RWA)	Skol Adrien Cycling Academy	+ 1' 08"
3	Carlos Quintero (COL)	Terengganu Inc. TSG	+ 2' 07"
DSQ	~~Patrick Schelling~~ (SUI)	~~Israel Start-Up Nation~~	~~+ 2' 10"~~
4	Kent Main (RSA)	ProTouch	+ 2' 21"
5	Simone Ravanelli (ITA)	Androni Giocattoli–Sidermec	+ 2' 32"
6	Jhonatan Restrepo (COL)	Androni Giocattoli–Sidermec	+ 2' 48"
7	Joseph Areruya (RWA)	Rwanda	+ 3' 52"
8	Awet Gebremedhin (SWE)	Israel Start-Up Nation	+ 4' 04"
9	Mulu Hailemichael (ETH)	Nippo–Delko–One Provence	+ 4' 26"
10	Biniam Girmay (ERI)	Nippo–Delko–One Provence	+ 4' 41"

=== Stage 7 ===
29 February 2020 — Kigali (Nyamirambo) to Kigali (Mur de Kigali), 4.5 km (2.8 mi) (ITT)

Stage 7 Result
Rank	Rider	Team	Time
1	Jhonatan Restrepo (COL)	Androni Giocattoli–Sidermec	6' 32"
2	Biniam Girmay (ERI)	Nippo–Delko–One Provence	+ 2"
DSQ	~~Patrick Schelling~~ (SUI)	~~Israel Start-Up Nation~~	~~+ 5"~~
3	Kent Main (RSA)	ProTouch	+ 12"
4	Yevgeniy Fedorov (KAZ)	Vino–Astana Motors	+ 14"
5	Carlos Quintero (COL)	Terengganu Inc. TSG	+ 14"
6	Dušan Rajović (SRB)	Nippo–Delko–One Provence	+ 15"
7	Christofer Jurado (PAN)	Terengganu Inc. TSG	+ 16"
8	Sirak Tesfom (ERI)	Eritrea	+ 16"
9	Grigoriy Shtein (KAZ)	Vino–Astana Motors	+ 18"
10	Joseph Areruya (RWA)	Rwanda	+ 22"

General classification after Stage 7
Rank	Rider	Team	Time
1	Natnael Tesfatsion (ERI)	Eritrea	20h 38' 58"
2	Moise Mugisha (RWA)	Skol Adrien Cycling Academy	+ 1' 30"
DSQ	~~Patrick Schelling~~ (SUI)	~~Israel Start-Up Nation~~	~~+ 1' 49"~~
3	Carlos Quintero (COL)	Terengganu Inc. TSG	+ 1' 55"
4	Kent Main (RSA)	ProTouch	+ 2' 06"
5	Jhonatan Restrepo (COL)	Androni Giocattoli–Sidermec	+ 2' 21"
6	Simone Ravanelli (ITA)	Androni Giocattoli–Sidermec	+ 2' 31"
7	Joseph Areruya (RWA)	Rwanda	+ 3' 48"
8	Awet Gebremedhin (SWE)	Israel Start-Up Nation	+ 4' 10"
9	Biniam Girmay (ERI)	Nippo–Delko–One Provence	+ 4' 16"
10	Mulu Hailemichael (ETH)	Nippo–Delko–One Provence	+ 4' 35"

=== Stage 8 ===
1 March 2020 — Kigali (PSF Expo Ground) to Kigali (Rebero), 89.3 km (55.5 mi)

Stage 8 Result
Rank	Rider	Team	Time
1	José Manuel Díaz (ESP)	Nippo–Delko–One Provence	2h 33' 24"
2	Moise Mugisha (RWA)	Skol Adrien Cycling Academy	+ 3"
3	Kent Main (RSA)	ProTouch	+ 7"
4	Simone Ravanelli (ITA)	Androni Giocattoli–Sidermec	+ 11"
DSQ	~~Patrick Schelling~~ (SUI)	~~Israel Start-Up Nation~~	~~+ 22"~~
5	Awet Gebremedhin (SWE)	Israel Start-Up Nation	+ 24"
6	Paul Ourselin (FRA)	Total Direct Énergie	+ 31"
7	Mulu Hailemichael (ETH)	Nippo–Delko–One Provence	+ 31"
8	Natnael Tesfatsion (ERI)	Eritrea	+ 39"
9	Henok Mulubrhan (ERI)	Eritrea	+ 39"
10	Jhonatan Restrepo (COL)	Androni Giocattoli–Sidermec	+ 43"

General classification after Stage 8
Rank	Rider	Team	Time
1	Natnael Tesfatsion (ERI)	Eritrea	23h 13' 01"
2	Moise Mugisha (RWA)	Skol Adrien Cycling Academy	+ 54"
DSQ	~~Patrick Schelling~~ (SUI)	~~Israel Start-Up Nation~~	~~+ 1' 32"~~
3	Kent Main (RSA)	ProTouch	+ 1' 34"
4	Simone Ravanelli (ITA)	Androni Giocattoli–Sidermec	+ 2' 03"
5	Carlos Quintero (COL)	Terengganu Inc. TSG	+ 2' 25"
6	Jhonatan Restrepo (COL)	Androni Giocattoli–Sidermec	+ 2' 25"
7	Awet Gebremedhin (SWE)	Israel Start-Up Nation	+ 3' 55"
8	Mulu Hailemichael (ETH)	Nippo–Delko–One Provence	+ 4' 27"
9	Henok Mulubrhan (ERI)	Eritrea	+ 4' 42"
10	Eric Manizabayo (RWA)	Benediction Ignite	+ 7' 03"

== Classification leadership table ==
Classification leadership by stage
Stage	Winner	General classification	Mountains classification	Young rider classification	Sprints classification	Best African rider classification	Team classification
1	Yevgeniy Fedorov	Yevgeniy Fedorov	Yevgeniy Fedorov	Yevgeniy Fedorov	Yevgeniy Fedorov	Henok Mulubrhan	Vino–Astana Motors
2	Mulu Hailemichael	Yevgeniy Fedorov	Yevgeniy Fedorov	Yevgeniy Fedorov	Yevgeniy Fedorov	Henok Mulubrhan	Vino–Astana Motors
3	Jhonatan Restrepo	Biniam Girmay	Dawit Yemane	Biniam Girmay	Dawit Yemane	Biniam Girmay	Eritrea
4	Natnael Tesfatsion	Natnael Tesfatsion	Carlos Oyarzún	Natnael Tesfatsion	Dawit Yemane	Natnael Tesfatsion	Eritrea
5	Jhonatan Restrepo	Natnael Tesfatsion	Carlos Oyarzún	Natnael Tesfatsion	Dawit Yemane	Natnael Tesfatsion	Eritrea
6	Jhonatan Restrepo	Natnael Tesfatsion	Carlos Oyarzún	Natnael Tesfatsion	Dawit Yemane	Natnael Tesfatsion	Androni Giocattoli–Sidermec
7	Jhonatan Restrepo	Natnael Tesfatsion	Carlos Oyarzún	Natnael Tesfatsion	Dawit Yemane	Natnael Tesfatsion	Androni Giocattoli–Sidermec
8	José Manuel Díaz	Natnael Tesfatsion	Rein Taaramäe	Natnael Tesfatsion	Dawit Yemane	Natnael Tesfatsion	Androni Giocattoli–Sidermec
Final		Natnael Tesfatsion	Rein Taaramäe	Natnael Tesfatsion	Dawit Yemane	Natnael Tesfatsion	Androni Giocattoli–Sidermec

== Final classification standings ==
Legend
Denotes the winner of the general classification	Denotes the winner of the sprints classification
Denotes the winner of the mountains classification	Denotes the winner of the best African rider classification
Denotes the winner of the young rider classification	Denotes the winner of the teams classification

=== General classification ===
Final general classification (1–10)
Rank	Rider	Team	Time
1	Natnael Tesfatsion (ERI)	Eritrea	23h 13' 01"
2	Moise Mugisha (RWA)	Skol Adrien Cycling Academy	+ 54"
DSQ	~~Patrick Schelling~~ (SUI)	~~Israel Start-Up Nation~~	~~+ 1' 32"~~
3	Kent Main (RSA)	ProTouch	+ 1' 34"
4	Simone Ravanelli (ITA)	Androni Giocattoli–Sidermec	+ 2' 03"
5	Carlos Quintero (COL)	Terengganu Inc. TSG	+ 2' 25"
6	Jhonatan Restrepo (COL)	Androni Giocattoli–Sidermec	+ 2' 25"
7	Awet Gebremedhin (SWE)	Israel Start-Up Nation	+ 3' 55"
8	Mulu Hailemichael (ETH)	Nippo–Delko–One Provence	+ 4' 27"
9	Henok Mulubrhan (ERI)	Eritrea	+ 4' 42"
10	Eric Manizabayo (RWA)	Benediction Ignite	+ 7' 03"

=== Mountains classification ===
Final mountains classification (1–10)
Rank	Rider	Team	Points
1	Rein Taaramäe (EST)	Total Direct Énergie	45
2	Moise Mugisha (RWA)	Skol Adrien Cycling Academy	43
3	Eric Manizabayo (RWA)	Benediction Ignite	41
4	Didier Munyaneza (RWA)	Benediction Ignite	38
5	Patrick Byukusenge (RWA)	Benediction Ignite	37
6	Carlos Oyarzún (CHI)	BAI–Sicasal–Petro de Luanda	35
7	Dawit Yemane (ERI)	Eritrea	33
8	Carlos Quintero (COL)	Terengganu Inc. TSG	31
9	Henok Mulubrhan (ERI)	Eritrea	20
10	Kent Main (RSA)	ProTouch	17

=== Young rider classification ===
Final young rider classification (1–10)
Rank	Rider	Team	Time
1	Natnael Tesfatsion (ERI)	Eritrea	23h 13' 01"
2	Moise Mugisha (RWA)	Skol Adrien Cycling Academy	+ 54"
3	Mulu Hailemichael (ETH)	Nippo–Delko–One Provence	+ 4' 27"
4	Henok Mulubrhan (ERI)	Eritrea	+ 4' 42"
5	Eric Manizabayo (RWA)	Benediction Ignite	+ 7' 03"
6	Biniam Girmay (ERI)	Nippo–Delko–One Provence	+ 8' 13"
7	Samuel Mugisha (RWA)	Rwanda	+ 11' 47"
8	Dawit Yemane (ERI)	Eritrea	+ 15' 29"
9	Yevgeniy Fedorov (KAZ)	Vino–Astana Motors	+ 21' 50"
10	Mehari Tewelde (ERI)	Eritrea	+ 24' 03"

=== Sprints classification ===
Final Sprints classification (1–10)
Rank	Rider	Team	Points
1	Dawit Yemane (ERI)	Eritrea	21
2	Temesgen Buru (ETH)	Ethiopia	10
3	Yevgeniy Fedorov (KAZ)	Vino–Astana Motors	8
4	Rein Taaramäe (EST)	Total Direct Énergie	8
5	Patrick Byukusenge (RWA)	Benediction Ignite	6
6	Negasi Abreha (ETH)	Ethiopia	5
7	Carlos Quintero (COL)	Terengganu Inc. TSG	4
8	Joonas Henttala (FIN)	Team Novo Nordisk	4
DSQ	~~Patrick Schelling~~ (SUI)	~~Israel Start-Up Nation~~	~~3~~
10	Mulu Hailemichael (ETH)	Nippo–Delko–One Provence	2

=== Best African rider classification ===
Final best African rider classification (1–10)
Rank	Rider	Team	Time
1	Natnael Tesfatsion (ERI)	Eritrea	23h 13' 01"
2	Moise Mugisha (RWA)	Skol Adrien Cycling Academy	+ 54"
3	Kent Main (RSA)	ProTouch	+ 1' 34"
4	Mulu Hailemichael (ETH)	Nippo–Delko–One Provence	+ 4' 27"
5	Henok Mulubrhan (ERI)	Eritrea	+ 4' 42"
6	Eric Manizabayo (RWA)	Benediction Ignite	+ 7' 03"
7	Joseph Areruya (RWA)	Rwanda	+ 7' 17"
8	Biniam Girmay (ERI)	Nippo–Delko–One Provence	+ 8' 13"
9	Samuel Mugisha (RWA)	Rwanda	+ 11' 47"
10	Dawit Yemane (ERI)	Eritrea	+ 15' 29"

=== Teams classification ===
Final teams classification (1–10)
Rank	Team	Time
1	Androni Giocattoli–Sidermec	69h 56' 56"
2	Eritrea	+ 2' 01"
3	Nippo–Delko–One Provence	+ 4' 57"
4	Israel Start-Up Nation	+ 24' 29"
5	Rwanda	+ 37' 22"
6	Ethiopia	+ 48' 20"
7	Bike Aid	+ 57' 38"
8	Vino–Astana Motors	+ 1h 05' 13"
9	Skol Adrien Cycling Academy	+ 1h 08' 12"
10	Benediction Ignite	+ 1h 15' 26"
