= 2020 Israel Start-Up Nation season =

Israel Start-Up Nation
- 2020 season
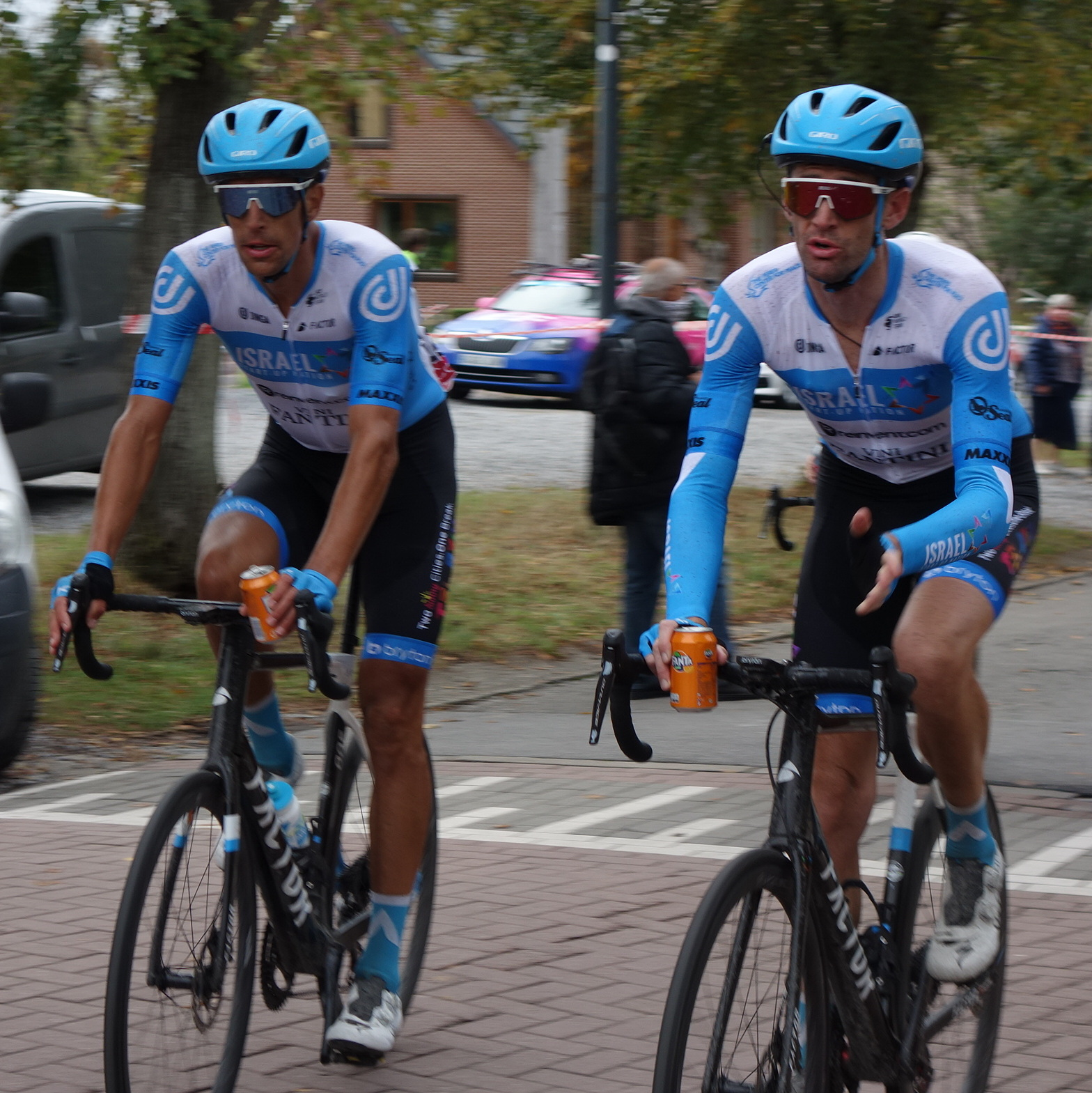
- Israel Start-Up Nation on La Flèche Wallonne
- UCI code: ISN
- Status: UCI WorldTeam
- Owner: Sylvan Adams, Ron Baron
- Manager: Kjell Carlström
- Main sponsor(s): Start-Up Nation Central
- Based: Israel
- Bicycles: Factor
- Groupset: Shimano

Season victories
- One-day races: 1
- Stage race stages: 5
- National Championships: 2
- Most wins: Rudy Barbier (2)
- Jersey

The 2020 cycling season for Israel Start-Up Nation began in January at the Tour Down Under in Australia.

The 2020 season is the team's first as a UCI WorldTeam. After the 2019 season, the team merged with the former Team Katusha–Alpecin team and took over the latter's WorldTeam license, stepping up from the UCI Professional Continental level. To coincide with this promotion, the team changed their name from Israel Cycling Academy to Israel Start-Up Nation, while the former name became the name of the team's Continental level development squad.

== Roster ==
As of 3 March 2020.

| Rider | Date of birth |
|---|---|
| Matteo Badilatti (SUI) | 30 July 1992 (aged 27) |
| Rudy Barbier (FRA) | 18 December 1992 (aged 27) |
| Jenthe Biermans (BEL) | 30 October 1995 (aged 24) |
| Guillaume Boivin (CAN) | 25 May 1989 (aged 30) |
| Matthias Brändle (AUT) | 7 December 1989 (aged 30) |
| Alexander Cataford (CAN) | 1 September 1993 (aged 26) |
| Davide Cimolai (ITA) | 13 August 1989 (aged 30) |
| Alex Dowsett (GBR) | 3 October 1988 (aged 31) |
| Itamar Einhorn (ISR) | 20 September 1997 (aged 22) |
| Omer Goldstein (ISR) | 13 August 1996 (aged 23) |
| André Greipel (GER) | 16 July 1982 (aged 37) |
| Ben Hermans (BEL) | 8 June 1986 (aged 33) |
| Hugo Hofstetter (FRA) | 13 February 1994 (aged 25) |
| Reto Hollenstein (SUI) | 22 August 1985 (aged 34) |
| Dan Martin (IRL) | 20 August 1986 (aged 33) |

| Rider | Date of birth |
|---|---|
| Travis McCabe (USA) | 12 May 1989 (aged 30) |
| Daniel Navarro (ESP) | 18 July 1983 (aged 36) |
| Krists Neilands (LAT) | 18 August 1994 (aged 25) |
| Guy Niv (ISR) | 8 March 1994 (aged 25) |
| James Piccoli (CAN) | 5 September 1991 (aged 28) |
| Nils Politt (GER) | 6 March 1994 (aged 25) |
| Mihkel Räim (EST) | 3 July 1993 (aged 26) |
| Alexis Renard (FRA) | 1 June 1999 (aged 20) |
| Guy Sagiv (ISR) | 5 December 1994 (aged 25) |
| Patrick Schelling (SUI) | 1 May 1990 (aged 29) |
| Rory Sutherland (AUS) | 8 February 1982 (aged 37) |
| Norman Vahtra (EST) | 23 November 1996 (aged 23) |
| Tom Van Asbroeck (BEL) | 19 April 1990 (aged 29) |
| Mads Würtz Schmidt (DEN) | 31 March 1994 (aged 25) |
| Rick Zabel (GER) | 7 December 1993 (aged 26) |

Riders who joined the team for the 2020 season

| Rider | 2019 team |
|---|---|
| Jenthe Biermans | Team Katusha–Alpecin |
| Alex Dowsett | Team Katusha–Alpecin |
| André Greipel | Arkéa–Samsic |
| Hugo Hofstetter | Cofidis |
| Reto Hollenstein | Team Katusha–Alpecin |
| Dan Martin | UAE Team Emirates |
| Travis McCabe | Floyd's Pro Cycling |
| Daniel Navarro | Team Katusha–Alpecin |
| James Piccoli | Elevate–KHS Pro Cycling |
| Nils Politt | Team Katusha–Alpecin |
| Alexis Renard | neo-pro (stagiaire) |
| Patrick Schelling | Team Vorarlberg Santic |
| Rory Sutherland | UAE Team Emirates |
| Norman Vahtra | neo-pro (Klubi Cycling Tartu) |
| Mads Würtz Schmidt | Team Katusha–Alpecin |
| Rick Zabel | Team Katusha–Alpecin |

Riders who left the team during or after the 2019 season

| Rider | 2020 team |
|---|---|
| Edwin Ávila | Israel Cycling Academy |
| Clément Carisey | Team Pro Immo Nicolas Roux |
| Zak Dempster | Retired |
| Conor Dunne | Retired |
| Nathan Earle | Team Ukyo |
| Sondre Holst Enger | Riwal Readynez |
| Awet Gebremedhin | Israel Cycling Academy |
| Roy Goldstein | Retired |
| August Jensen | Riwal Readynez |
| Riccardo Minali | Nippo–Delko–One Provence |
| Ben Perry | Israel Cycling Academy |
| Rubén Plaza | Retired |
| Kristian Sbaragli | Alpecin–Fenix |
| Hamish Schreurs | |
| Daniel Turek | Israel Cycling Academy |
| Dennis van Winden | |

== Season victories ==
| Date | Race | Competition | Rider | Country | Location |
|---|---|---|---|---|---|
| 26 January | Vuelta a San Juan, Stage 1 | UCI America Tour; UCI ProSeries | Rudy Barbier (FRA) | Argentina | San Juan |
| 20 February | Tour of Antalya, Stage 1 | UCI Europe Tour | Mihkel Räim (EST) | Turkey | Antalya |
| 3 March | Le Samyn | UCI Europe Tour | Hugo Hofstetter (FRA) | Belgium | Dour |
| 19 September | Okolo Slovenska, Stage 4 | UCI Europe Tour | Rudy Barbier (FRA) | Slovakia | Skalica |
| 10 October | Giro d'Italia, Stage 8 | UCI World Tour | Alex Dowsett (GBR) | Italy | Vieste |
| 22 October | Vuelta a España, Stage 3 | UCI World Tour | Dan Martin (IRL) | Spain | La Laguna Negra de Vinuesa |

== National, Continental and World Champions ==
| Date | Discipline | Jersey | Rider | Country | Location |
|---|---|---|---|---|---|
| 20 August | Estonian National Road Race Championships | | Norman Vahtra (EST) | Estonia | Keila |
| 22 August | Austrian National Time Trial Championships | | Matthias Brändle (AUT) | Austria | Lutzmannsburg |
