= Moise Mugisha =

Rwandan cyclist (born 1997)

Personal information
- Full name: Moise Mugisha
- Born: 1 January 1997 (age 29) Busogo, Rwanda
- Height: 1.68 m (5 ft 6 in)
- Weight: 58 kg (128 lb)

Cycling career
- Sport: Cycling
- Current team: Benediction Banafrica Team
- Discipline: Road
- Role: Rider

Amateur teams
- 2018: Club Les Amis Sportifs
- 2018–2019: Fly Cycling Club
- 2020: La Roche-sur-Yon Vendée Cyclisme
- 2023–: Benediction Kitei Pro 2020
- 2026: Ho Chi Minh City Vinama

Professional teams
- 2020–2021: Skol Adrien Cycling Academy
- 2021–2022: ProTouch

Moise Mugisha (born 1 January 1997) is a Rwandan cyclist, who currently rides for Vietnamese amateur team Ho Chi Minh City Vinama.

== Major results ==
2018
Africa Cup

2nd Team time trial
6th Time trial

10th Overall Tour of Rwanda
2019
1st Time trial, African Under-23 Road Championships
National Under-23 Road Championships

1st Road race
2nd Time trial

1st Mountains classification Tour du Cameroun
1st Stage 5 Tour de l'Espoir
African Road Championships

2nd Team time trial
8th Time trial

African Games

3rd Time trial
3rd Team time trial

4th Overall Tour du Faso

1st Stage 3

2020
1st Overall Grand Prix Chantal Biya

1st Young rider classification
1st Stages 1 & 4

2nd Overall Tour du Rwanda
2021
African Road Championships

2nd Team time trial
2nd Mixed team relay
3rd Time trial

2022
1st Overall Tour du Cameroun
Tour du Rwanda

1st Mountains classification
1st Stage 8

1st Race To Remember-Rwanda
1st Royal NIanza Race
1st Musanze Gorilla Race
1st Kibeho Race
2023
1st Time trial, National Road Championships
1st Overall Akagera Race
1st Overall Nyaruguru Liberation Day Race

1st Stage 1

1st Legacy Sakumi Anselme Race
African Road Championships

2nd Time trial
3rd Team time trial

2026
1st Mountains classification HTV Cup
