= Gasore Hategeka =

Rwandan bicycle racer

Personal information
- Full name: Gasore Hategeka
- Born: 1 March 1987 (age 39)

Cycling career
- Sport: Cycling
- Discipline: Road
- Role: Rider

Amateur team
- 2011: World Cycling Centre

Professional team
- 2019: Benediction–Excel Energy

Gasore Hategeka (born 1 March 1987) is a Rwandan cyclist, who last rode for UCI Continental team Benediction–Excel Energy. He is a former national road race champion of Rwanda.

== Major results ==
2010
1st Stage 3 Tour du Cameroun
2nd Road race, National Road Championships
2011
7th Overall Tour du Cameroun

1st Stage 3

8th Overall Kwita Izina Cycling Tour
10th Overall Tour of Rwanda
2012
10th Overall Kwita Izina Cycling Tour
2013
1st Road race, National Road Championships
2015
4th Overall Grand Prix Chantal Biya
2016
1st Stage 3 Tour de Côte d'Ivoire
2017
1st Road race, National Road Championships
2018
3rd Road race, National Road Championships
