= Nathan Byukusenge =

Rwandan cyclist (born 1980)

Personal information
- Born: 8 August 1980 (age 46) Gihara, Southern Province, Rwanda

Cycling career
- Sport: Cycling
- Current team: Retired
- Disciplines: Road; Mountain biking
- Role: Rider

Amateur teams
- 2011–2013: Rwanda Karisimbi
- 2014–2015: Rwanda Muhabura

Nathan Byukusenge (born 8 August 1980) is a Rwandan former professional road cyclist and cross-country mountain biker. His younger brother Patrick Byukusenge is also a cyclist.

== Career ==
Born in Gihara in the Southern Province, Byukusenge is a survivor of the Rwandan genocide of 1994. At the age of 14, he managed to escape and remained hidden for several weeks in a forest. A few years later, he became a “taxi-cyclist”, transporting his clients for hours around the capital city of Kigali.

He started competing in 2003 or 2004. In 2007, he joined the first Rwandan cycling team, and quickly became one of the best cyclists in the country, with high results at races including the Tour du Rwanda and the Rwandan National Road Race Championships. After considering ending his career in 2014, he decided to continue competing, in both mountain biking and road cycling. In 2015, he finished eighth in the Tour du Rwanda and ninth in the Tour du Cameroun. The same year, he became the first Rwandan cyclist to compete in the cross-country event at the UCI Mountain Bike World Championships, where he finished 92nd. In August 2016, he competed in the cross-country event at the 2016 Summer Olympics. After this, he chose to officially end his career.

== Major results ==
2007
3rd Overall Tour du Rwanda
2008
2nd Overall Tour du Rwanda
2010
9th Overall Tour du Cameroun
2011
2nd Road race, National Road Championships
4th Overall Tour du Rwanda
6th Team time trial, African Road Championships
2012
2nd Road race, National Road Championships
6th Overall Kwita Izina Cycling Tour
2013
3rd Road race, National Road Championships
2015
8th Overall Tour du Rwanda
9th Overall Tour du Cameroun
