= Valens Ndayisenga =

Rwandan cyclist (born 1994)

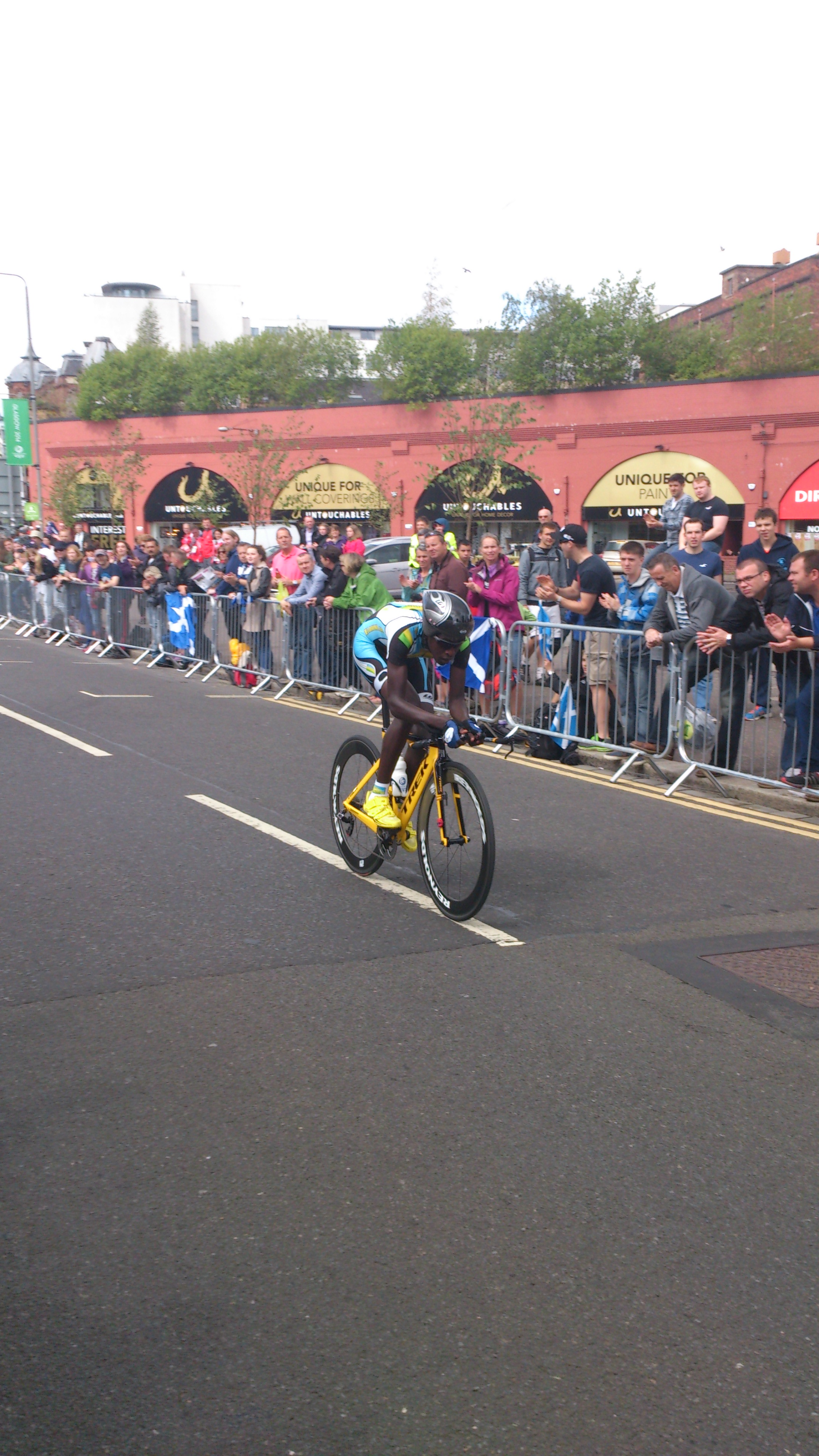
- Ndayisenga at the 2014 Commonwealth Games

Personal information
- Full name: Valens Ndayisenga
- Born: 1 January 1994 (age 32) Muhazi-Rwamagana, Rwanda

Cycling career
- Sport: Cycling
- Discipline: Road
- Role: Rider

Amateur teams
- 2014–2015: World Cycling Centre
- 2018: POC Côte de Lumière

Professional teams
- 2016: Dimension Data for Qhubeka
- 2017: Tirol Cycling Team

Valens Ndayisenga (born 1 January 1994) is a Rwandan former professional cyclist, who competed professionally in 2016 and 2017 for the Dimension Data for Qhubeka and Tirol Cycling Team squads.

Born in Muhazi-Rwamagana, Ndayisenga was the 2014 National Road Race champion of Rwanda. He was 8th on stage 4 of the 2014 La Tropicale Amissa Bongo and represented his country at the 2014 Commonwealth Games in Glasgow in the time trial finishing in 23rd place. In 2016, he won the Tour of Rwanda for a second time.

== Major results ==
2012
3rd Road race, National Road Championships
5th Time trial, African Junior Road Championships
2013
1st Stage 2 Tour of Rwanda
7th Time trial, African Road Championships
2014
National Road Championships

1st Road race
1st Time trial

1st Overall Tour of Rwanda

1st Young rider classification
1st Stage 2

5th Grand Prix d'Oran
6th Overall Tour de Blida
7th Circuit d'Alger
2015
1st Time trial, National Road Championships
1st Prologue Tour d'Egypte
African Road Championships

2nd Under-23 time trial
4th Team time trial
6th Under-23 road race
7th Time trial

African Games

3rd Team time trial
10th Time trial

2016
1st Overall Tour of Rwanda

1st Young rider classification
1st Stages 2 & 6

2nd Time trial, National Road Championships
African Road Championships

5th Team time trial
6th Time trial

2017
National Road Championships

2nd Road race
2nd Time trial

African Road Championships

3rd Team time trial
5th Time trial

6th Overall Tour of Rwanda

1st Stage 7

10th Overall Tour du Cameroun

1st Young rider classification

2018
2nd Team time trial, African Road Championships
6th Overall Tour of Rwanda
2019
African Road Championships

2nd Team time trial
9th Time trial
