= 2017 Vuelta a Murcia =

2017 UCI Europe Tour

Race details
- Dates: 11 February 2017
- Stages: 1
- Distance: 182.7 km (113.5 mi)
- Winning time: 4h 03' 08"

Results
	Winner	Alejandro Valverde (Spain)	(Movistar Team)
	Second	Jhonatan Restrepo (Colombia)	(Team Katusha–Alpecin)
	Third	Patrick Konrad (Austria)	(Bora–Hansgrohe)

The 2017 Vuelta a Murcia was the 37th edition of the Vuelta a Murcia road cycling one day race. It was part of the 2017 UCI Europe Tour, as a 1.1 categorised race.

The race was won for a record-extending fifth time by local rider Alejandro Valverde of the Movistar Team, attacking the peloton with around 70 kilometres (43 miles) remaining, and soloing away to victory by over two minutes from his closest competitor. In the sprint finish from a select group of 20 riders, Jhonatan Restrepo (Team Katusha–Alpecin) took second place ahead of Bora–Hansgrohe's Patrick Konrad.

== Teams ==
Twenty teams were invited to take part in the race. These included six UCI WorldTeams, eight UCI Professional Continental teams, five UCI Continental teams and a Spanish national team.

UCI WorldTeams

- Bahrain–Merida
- Bora–Hansgrohe
- Team Katusha–Alpecin
- Lotto–Soudal
- Movistar Team
- Orica–Scott

UCI Professional Continental Teams

- Caja Rural–Seguros RGA
- CCC–Sprandi–Polkowice
- Cofidis
- Direct Énergie
- Gazprom–RusVelo
- Roompot–Nederlandse Loterij
- Sport Vlaanderen–Baloise
- Wanty–Groupe Gobert

UCI Continental Teams

- Burgos BH
- Dare Viator Partizan
- Euskadi Basque Country–Murias
- Rally Cycling
- Team Ukyo

National teams

- Spain

== Result ==
Result
Rank	Rider	Team	Time
1	Alejandro Valverde (ESP)	Movistar Team	4h 03' 08"
2	Jhonatan Restrepo (COL)	Team Katusha–Alpecin	+ 2' 10"
3	Patrick Konrad (AUT)	Bora–Hansgrohe	+ 2' 10"
4	Jürgen Roelandts (BEL)	Lotto–Soudal	+ 2' 10"
5	Baptiste Planckaert (BEL)	Team Katusha–Alpecin	+ 2' 10"
6	Ion Izagirre (ESP)	Bahrain–Merida	+ 2' 10"
7	Christopher Juul-Jensen (DNK)	Orica–Scott	+ 2' 10"
8	Tiesj Benoot (BEL)	Lotto–Soudal	+ 2' 10"
9	Pieter Weening (NED)	Roompot–Nederlandse Loterij	+ 2' 10"
10	Emanuel Buchmann (GER)	Bora–Hansgrohe	+ 2' 10"
