= 2019 Klasika Primavera =

2019 UCI Europe Tour

Race details
- Dates: 14 April 2019
- Stages: 1
- Distance: 171.6 km (106.6 mi)
- Winning time: 3:57:03

Results
	Winner	Carlos Betancur (COL)	(Movistar Team)
	Second	Carlos Julián Quintero (COL)	(Team Manzana Postobón)
	Third	Eduard Prades (ESP)	(Movistar Team)

The 2019 Klasika Primavera was the 65th edition of the Klasika Primavera, a one-day road cycling race, held on 14 April 2019. It was part of the 2019 UCI Europe Tour as a category 1.1 event.

== Teams ==
Nine teams started the race. Each team had a maximum of eight riders:

UCI WorldTeams

- Movistar Team

UCI Professional Continental teams

- Euskadi–Murias
- Burgos BH
- Caja Rural–Seguros RGA
- Team Manzana Postobón

UCI Continental teams

- Fundación Euskadi
- Guerciotti–Kiwi Atlantico
- Kometa Cycling Team
- Interpro Cycling Academy

== Result ==
The race was won by the Colombian cyclist Carlos Betancur of Movistar Team.

Final general classification

Rank	Rider	Team	Time
1	Carlos Betancur (COL)	Movistar Team	3h 57' 03"
2	Carlos Julián Quintero (COL)	Team Manzana Postobón	s.t.
3	Eduard Prades (ESP)	Movistar Team	s.t.
4	Sergio Higuita (COL)	Fundación Euskadi	s.t.
5	Txomin Juaristi (ESP)	Fundación Euskadi	+ 3"
6	Mikel Bizkarra (ESP)	Euskadi–Murias	+ 5"
7	Mikel Iturria (ESP)	Euskadi–Murias	+ 37"
8	Carlos Barbero (ESP)	Movistar Team	+ 2:13"
9	Mario González (ESP)	Euskadi–Murias	s.t.
10	Juan Felipe Osorio (COL)	Team Manzana Postobón	s.t.
