= Rwandan National Time Trial Championships =

National road cycling championship in Rwanda

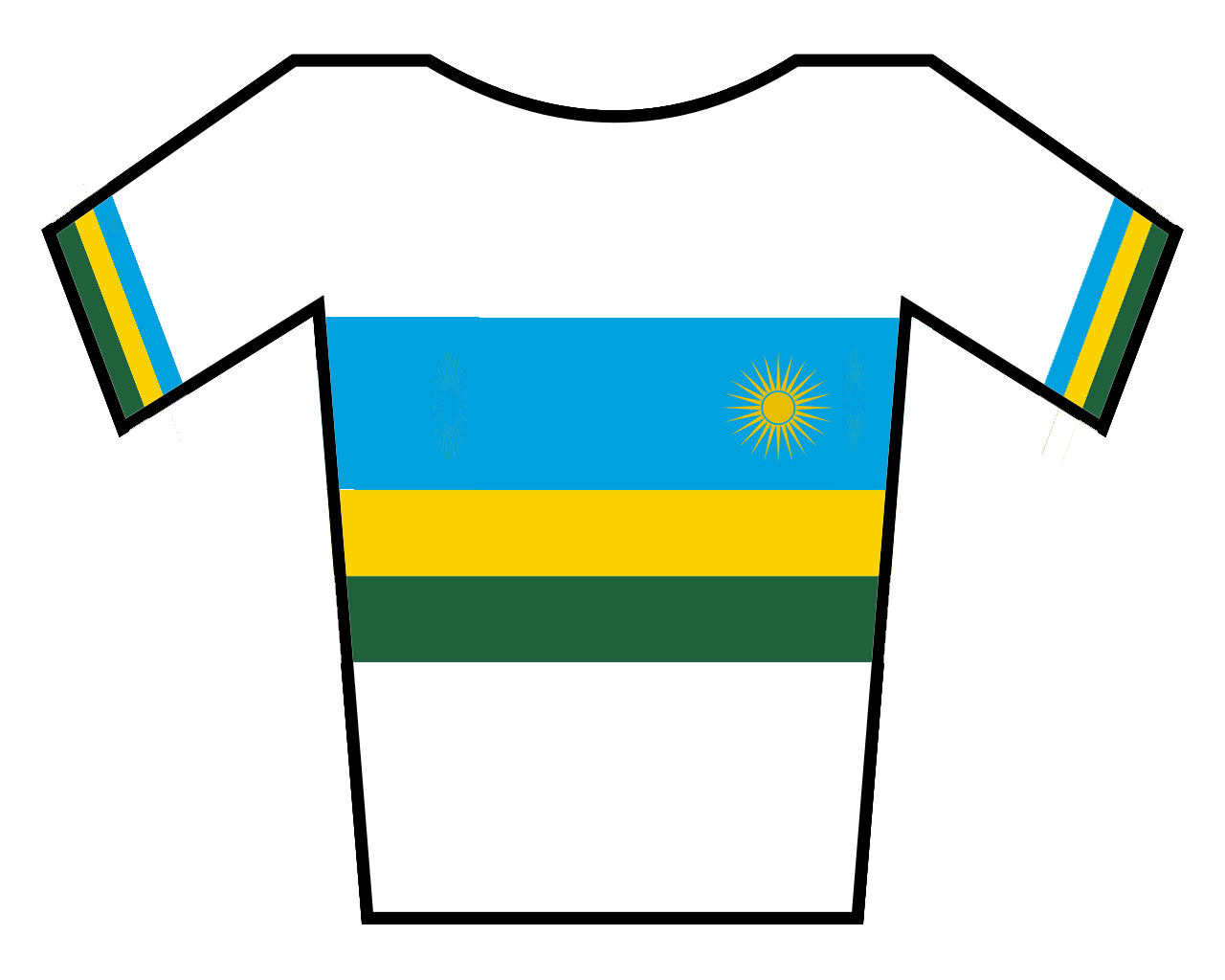
- The champion's jersey

Race details
- Date: June
- Discipline: Road
- Type: One-day race

History (men)
- First edition: 2014
- Editions: 10 (as of 2025)
- First winner: Valens Ndayisenga
- Most wins: Valens Ndayisenga; Adrien Niyonshuti; Joseph Areruya; Moise Mugisha; (2 wins)
- Most recent: Shemu Nsengiyumva

History (women)
- First edition: 2014
- Editions: 9 (as of 2025)
- First winner: Jeanne d'Arc Girubuntu
- Most wins: Diane Ingabire (3 wins)
- Most recent: Xaverine Nirere

The Rwandan National Time Trial Championships are held annually to decide the cycling champions in the time trial discipline, across various categories. The championship was first held in 2014, and since 2015 has included an under-23 category.

== Men ==
Year	Gold	Silver	Bronze
2014	Valens Ndayisenga	Jean Bosco Nsengimana	Adrien Niyonshuti
2015	Valens Ndayisenga	Jean Bosco Nsengimana	Joseph Areruya
2016	Adrien Niyonshuti	Valens Ndayisenga	Bonaventure Uwizeyimana
2017	Adrien Niyonshuti	Valens Ndayisenga	Jean Bosco Nsengimana
2018	Joseph Areruya	Jean Bosco Nsengimana	Camera Hakuzimana
2019	Joseph Areruya	Jean Bosco Nsengimana	Samuel Mugisha
2020– 2021	Not held due to the COVID-19 pandemic in Rwanda		
2022	Didier Munyaneza	Samuel Mugisha	Patrick Byukusenge
2023	Moise Mugisha	Shemu Nsengiyumva	Joseph Areruya
2024	Moise Mugisha	Etienne Tuyizere	Patrick Byukusenge
2025	Shemu Nsengiyumva	Eric Muhoza	David Niyonsaba

=== U23 ===
Year	Gold	Silver	Bronze
2015	Valens Ndayisenga	Jean Bosco Nsengimana	Joseph Areruya
2016	Valens Ndayisenga	Ephrem Tuyishimire	Samuel Hakiruwizeye
2017	Ephrem Tuyishimire	Didier Munyaneza	Jean Ruberwa
2018	Renus Byiza Uhiriwe	Jean Claude Nzafashwanayo	Yves Nkurunziza
2019	Jean Eric Habimana	Barnabe Gahemba	Renus Byiza Uhiriwe
2020– 2021	Not held due to the COVID-19 pandemic in Rwanda		
2022	Swayibu Kagibwami	Eric Muhoza	Renus Byiza Uhiriwe
2023	Etienne Tuyizere	Renus Byiza Uhiriwe	Emmanuel Iradukunda
2025	Samuel Niyonkuru	Kevin Nshutiraguma	Jean de Dieu Manizabayo

== Women ==
Year	Gold	Silver	Bronze
2014	Jeanne d'Arc Girubuntu	Janette Uwineza	Beatha Ingabire
2015	Not held		
2016	Jeanne d'Arc Girubuntu	Beatha Ingabire	Clementine Niyonsaba
2017	Beatha Ingabire	Jeanne d'Arc Girubuntu	Magnifique Manizabayo
2018	Jacqueline Tuyishimire	Violette Irakoze Neza	Xaverine Nirere
2019	Josiane Mukashema	Jacqueline Tuyishimire	Violette Irakoze Neza
2020– 2021	Not held due to the COVID-19 pandemic in Rwanda		
2022	Diane Ingabire	Jacqueline Tuyishimire	Violette Irakoze Neza
2023	Diane Ingabire	Valentine Nzayisenga	Marthe Ntakirutimana
2024	Diane Ingabire	Violette Neza	Josiane Mukashema
2025	Xaverine Nirere	Diane Ingabire	Violette Neza

=== U23 ===
Year	Gold	Silver	Bronze
2025	Djazilla Umwamikazi	Marthe Ntakirutimana	Domina Ingabire

== See also ==
- Rwandan National Road Race Championships
- National road cycling championships
