= Rwandan National Road Race Championships =

National road cycling championship in Rwanda

The Rwandan National Road Race Championships are held annually to decide the cycling champions in the road race discipline, across various categories. The championship was first held in 2010, and since 2015 has included an under-23 category.

== Men ==
Rwandan National Road Race Championships – men's race
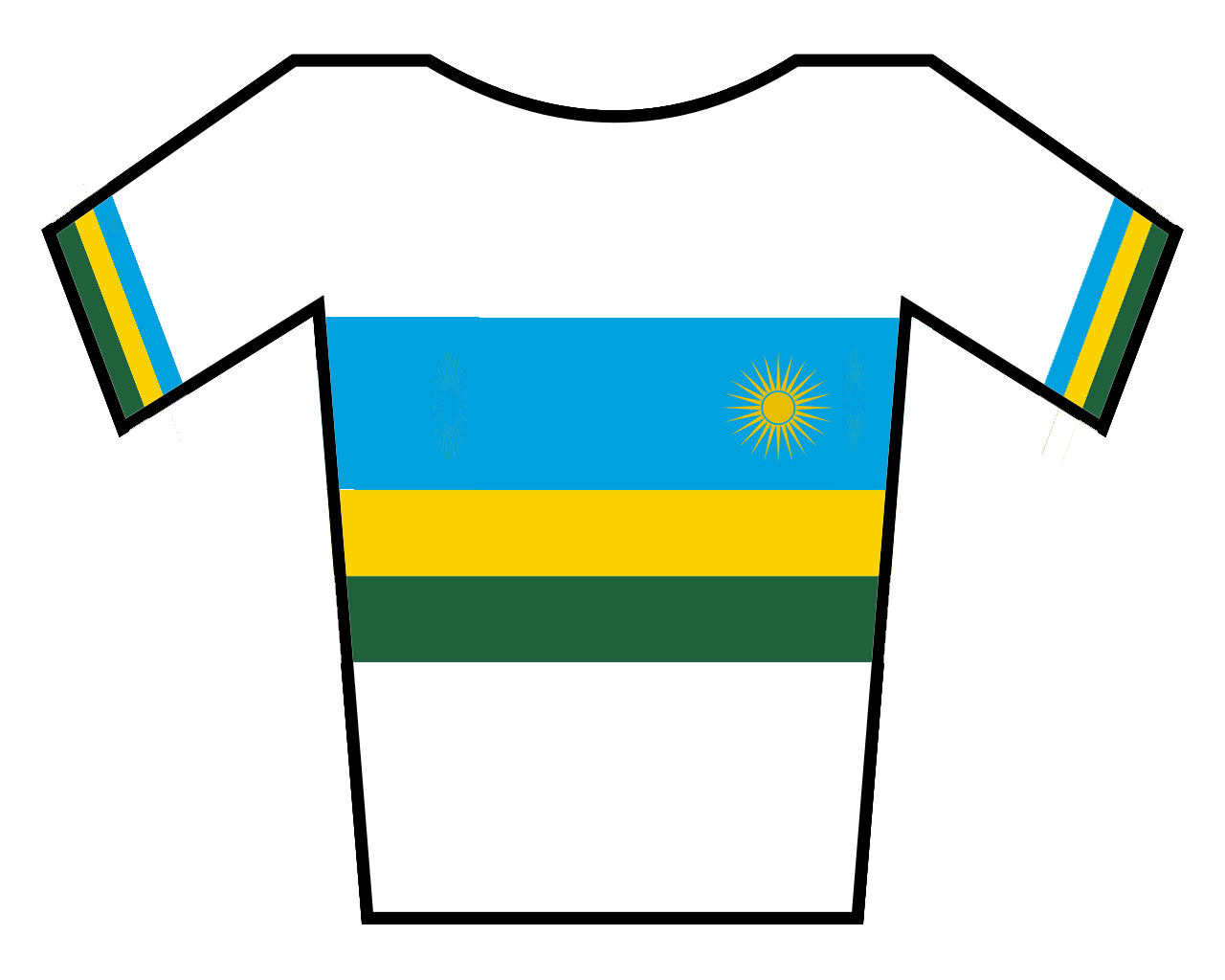
- The champion's jersey

Race details
- Date: June
- Discipline: Road
- Type: One-day race

History
- First edition: 2010
- Editions: 14 (as of 2025)
- First winner: Adrien Niyonshuti
- Most wins: Adrien Niyonshuti (3 wins)
- Most recent: Eric Nkundabera

Year	Gold	Silver	Bronze
2010	Adrien Niyonshuti	Gasore Hategeka	Nathan Byukusenge
2011	Adrien Niyonshuti	Nathan Byukusenge	Abraham Ruhumuriza
2012	Adrien Niyonshuti	Nathan Byukusenge	Valens Ndayisenga
2013	Gasore Hategeka	Bonaventure Uwizeyimana	Nathan Byukusenge
2014	Valens Ndayisenga	Janvier Hadi	Bonaventure Uwizeyimana
2015	Joseph Biziyaremye	Joseph Areruya	Abraham Ruhumuriza
2016	Bonaventure Uwizeyimana	Adrien Niyonshuti	Joseph Biziyaremye
2017	Gasore Hategeka	Valens Ndayisenga	Jean Bosco Nsengimana
2018	Didier Munyaneza	Mathieu Twizerana	Gasore Hategeka
2019	Bonaventure Uwizeyimana	Jean Ruberwa	Moise Mugisha
2020– 2021	Not held due to the COVID-19 pandemic in Rwanda		
2022	Eric Manizabayo	Emmanuel Iradukunda	Didier Munyaneza
2023	Patrick Byukusenge	Renus Uhiriwe	Shemu Nsengiyumva
2024	Vainqueur Masengesho	Samuel Niyonkuru	Etienne Tuyizere
2025	Eric Nkundabera	Jeremie Ngendahayo	Eric Muhoza

=== U23 ===
Year	Gold	Silver	Bronze
2015	Joseph Areruya	Jean-Claude Uwizeye	Jeremie Karegeya
2016	Valens Ndayisenga	Samuel Hakiruwizeye	Gasore Bizimana
2017	Jean Ruberwa	Samuel Hakiruwizeye	Jean Claude Mfitumukiza
2018	Jean Eric Habimana	Barnabé Gahemba	Renus Byiza Uhiriwe
2019	Barnabé Gahemba	Felicien Hakizimana	Renus Byiza Uhiriwe
2020– 2021	Not held due to the COVID-19 pandemic in Rwanda		
2022	Emmanuel Iradukunda	Eric Muhoza	Jean Claude Nzafashwanayo

== Women ==
Year	Gold	Silver	Bronze
2014	Jeanne d'Arc Girubuntu	Janette Uwineza	Beatha Ingabire
2015	Not held		
2016	Jeanne d'Arc Girubuntu	Beatha Ingabire	Clementine Nivonsaba
2017	Beatha Ingabire	Xaverine Nirere	Samantha Dushimiyimana
2018	Xaverine Nirere	Valentine Nzayisenga	Beatha Ingabire
2019	Valentine Nzayisenga	Josiane Mukashema	Diane Ishimwe
2020– 2021	Not held due to the COVID-19 pandemic in Rwanda		
2022	Diane Ingabire	Jacqueline Tuyishimire	Josiane Mukashema
2023	Diane Ingabire	Djazilla Umwamikazi	Josiane Mukashema
2024	Ingabire Diane	Violette Neza	Josiane Mukashema
2025	Djazilla Umwamikazi	Diane Ingabire	Xaverine Nirere

== See also ==
- Rwandan National Time Trial Championships
- National road cycling championships
