= Jean Bosco Nsengimana =

Rwandan cyclist (born 1992)

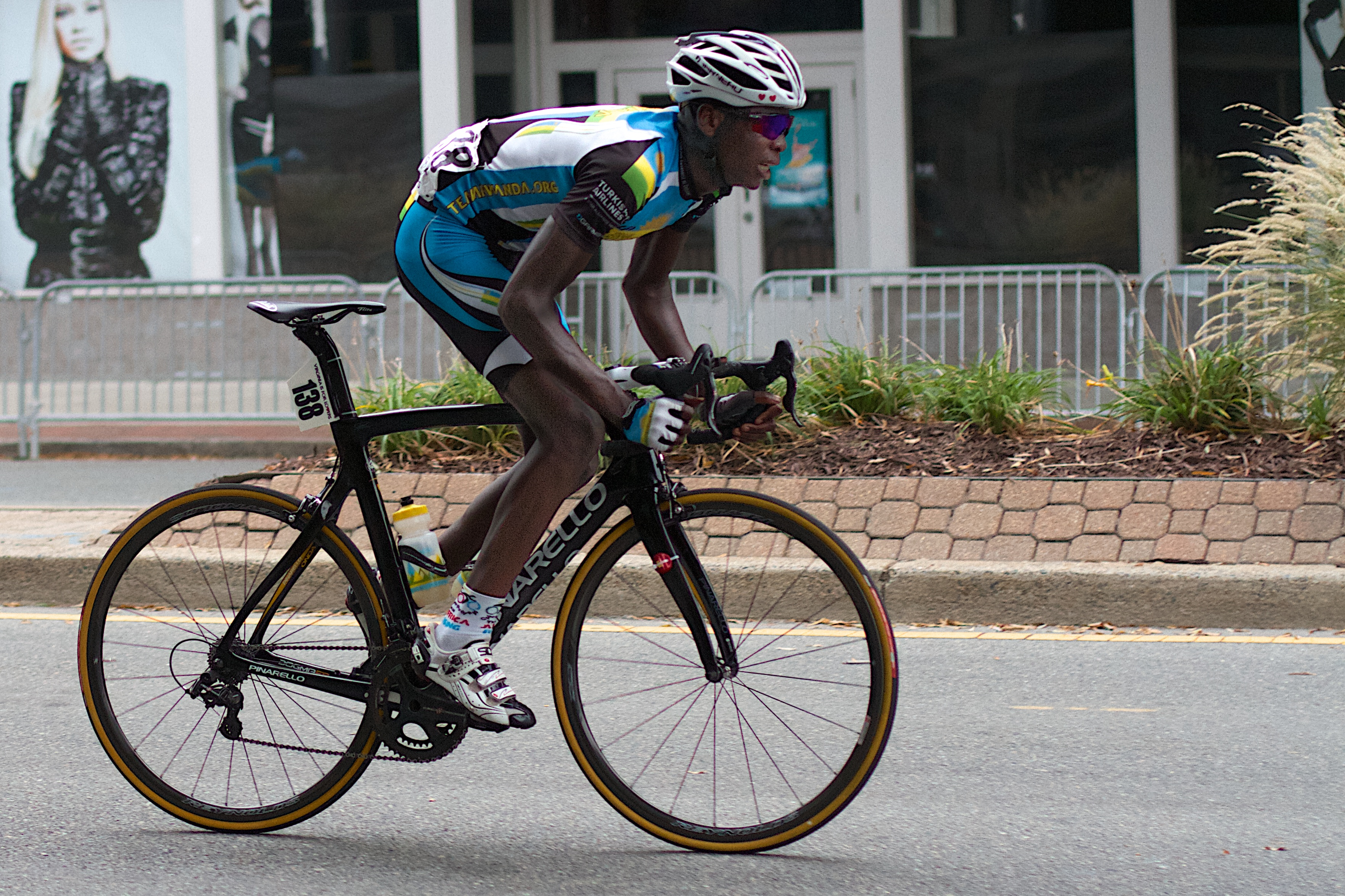
- Nsengimana at the 2015 UCI Road World Championships

Personal information
- Full name: Jean Bosco Nsengimana
- Born: 4 November 1992 (age 33) Shashwara, Rwanda

Cycling career
- Sport: Cycling
- Current team: Benediction Banafrica Team
- Discipline: Road
- Role: Rider

Amateur teams
- 2014–2015: Rwanda Karisimbi
- 2023–: Benediction Kitei Pro 2020

Professional teams
- 2016: Stradalli–Bike Aid
- 2019: Benediction–Excel Energy
- 2020: Skol Adrien Cycling Academy
- 2022: Benediction Ignite

Jean Bosco Nsengimana (born 4 November 1992 in Shashwara) is a Rwandan cyclist, who rides for Rwandan amateur team Benediction Banafrica Team. He won the Tour du Rwanda in 2015 and rode at the UCI Road World Championships.

== Major results ==
2013
6th Overall Tour du Rwanda
10th Overall Fenkil Northern Red Sea Challenge
2014
1st Mountains classification Tour de Blida
2nd Time trial, National Road Championships
2nd Overall Tour du Rwanda
2015
1st Overall Tour du Rwanda

1st Young rider classification
1st Prologue, Stages 3 & 6

National Road Championships

2nd Time trial
2nd Under-23 time trial

3rd Team time trial, African Games
5th Overall Tour de Blida
6th Grand Prix d'Oran
2016
1st Stage 5 Tour du Cameroun
1st Stage 5 Grand Prix Chantal Biya
9th Overall Tour du Rwanda
2017
1st Mountains classification Tour du Cameroun
3rd Team time trial, African Road Championships
National Road Championships

3rd Time trial
3rd Road race

4th Overall Tour Meles Zenawi
4th Overall Tour du Rwanda

1st Prologue

2018
African Road Championships

2nd Time trial
2nd Team time trial

2nd Time trial, National Road Championships
2019
2nd Team time trial, African Road Championships
2nd Time trial, National Road Championships
2021
African Road Championships

2nd Team time trial
2nd Mixed team relay

2022
3rd Time trial, African Road Championships
2023
3rd Team time trial, African Road Championships
