= Bonaventure Uwizeyimana =

Rwandan cyclist (born 1993)

Personal information
- Full name: Bonaventure Uwizeyimana
- Born: 4 January 1993 (age 33) Kigali, Rwanda

Cycling career
- Sport: Cycling
- Discipline: Road
- Role: Rider

Amateur teams
- 2013: World Cycling Centre Africa
- 2017–2018: Benediction Cycling Team

Professional teams
- 2016: Dimension Data for Qhubeka
- 2019: Benediction–Excel Energy

Bonaventure Uwizeyimana (born January 4, 1993) is a Rwandan cyclist, who last rode for UCI Continental team Benediction–Excel Energy.

== Career ==
Uwizeyimana won the 5th stage at the 2014 La Tropicale Amissa Bongo. In 2017, he won a stage at the Tour du Rwanda.

Uwizeyimana competed in the road race at the 2014 Commonwealth Games and the under-23 road race at the 2014 UCI Road World Championships, but did not finish either race.

He was part of the feeder system for Team Europcar.

== Major results ==
2013
2nd Road race, National Road Championships
9th Asmara Circuit
2014
1st Stage 5 La Tropicale Amissa Bongo
3rd Road race, National Road Championships
2015
4th Team time trial, African Road Championships
5th Overall Grand Prix Chantal Biya
6th Overall La Tropicale Amissa Bongo

1st Young rider classification

6th Overall Tour d'Oranie
6th Overall Tour d'Annaba
6th Grand Prix Fkih Ben Saleh, Challenge des phosphates
10th Circuit d'Alger
2016
National Road Championships

1st Road race
3rd Time trial

2017
1st Stage 5 Tour of Rwanda
6th Overall La Tropicale Amissa Bongo
9th Asmara Circuit
9th Massawa Circuit
2018
1st Overall Tour du Cameroun

1st Points classification
1st Stage 5

4th Overall Tour du Sénégal
2019
1st Road race, National Road Championships
