= 2021 Giro di Sicilia =

2021 UCI Europe Tour

Race details
- Dates: 28 September – 1 October 2021
- Stages: 4
- Distance: 712 km (442.4 mi)
- Winning time: 18h 09' 50"

Results
Jersey awarded to the overall winner	Winner	Vincenzo Nibali (ITA)	(Trek–Segafredo)
	Second	Alejandro Valverde (ESP)	(Movistar Team)
	Third	Alessandro Covi (ITA)	(UAE Team Emirates)
Jersey awarded to the points classification winner	Points	Juan Sebastián Molano (COL)	(UAE Team Emirates)
Jersey awarded to the mountains classification winner	Mountains	Cristian Scaroni (ITA)	(Gazprom–RusVelo)
Jersey awarded to the youth classification winner	Youth	Alessandro Covi (ITA)	(UAE Team Emirates)
	Team	Trek–Segafredo	

The 2021 Giro di Sicilia (known as Il Giro di Sicilia EOLO for sponsorship reasons) was the 25th edition of the Giro di Sicilia road cycling stage race and the second edition since its revival in 2019. The race was originally scheduled for April but had been postponed due to COVID-19 pandemic restrictions, which had also caused the cancellation of the 2020 edition.

== Teams ==
Five of the 19 UCI WorldTeams, eight UCI ProTeams, and seven UCI Continental teams made up the 20 teams that participated in the race. Amore & Vita and Zalf Euromobil Fior, with six riders each, were the only teams to not enter a full squad of seven riders. 133 riders started the race, of which 84 finished.

UCI WorldTeams

- Israel Start-Up Nation
- Movistar Team
- Team DSM
- Trek–Segafredo
- UAE Team Emirates

UCI ProTeams

- Androni Giocattoli–Sidermec
- Bardiani–CSF–Faizanè
- Caja Rural–Seguros RGA
- Eolo–Kometa
- Euskaltel–Euskadi
- Gazprom–RusVelo
- Rally Cycling
- Vini Zabù

UCI Continental Teams

- Amore & Vita
- D'Amico–UM Tools
- Giotti Victoria–Savini Due
- MG.K vis VPM
- Team Colpack–Ballan
- Work Service–Marchiol–Vega
- Zalf Euromobil Fior

== Route ==
Stage characteristics and winners
Stage	Date	Route	Distance	Type	Winner
1	28 September	Avola to Licata	179 km (111 mi)	Flat stage	Juan Sebastián Molano (COL)
2	29 September	Selinunte (Castelvetrano) to Mondello (Palermo)	173 km (107 mi)	Hilly stage	Juan Sebastián Molano (COL)
3	30 September	Termini Imerese to Caronia	180 km (110 mi)	Hilly stage	Alejandro Valverde (ESP)
4	1 October	Sant'Agata di Militello to Mascali	180 km (110 mi)	Mountain stage	Vincenzo Nibali (ITA)
Total			712 km (442 mi)		

== Stages ==
=== Stage 1 ===
28 September 2021 — Avola to Licata, 179 km (111 mi)

Stage 1 Result
Rank	Rider	Team	Time
1	Juan Sebastián Molano (COL)	UAE Team Emirates	4h 37' 21"
2	Vincenzo Albanese (ITA)	Eolo–Kometa	+ 0"
3	Maximiliano Richeze (ARG)	UAE Team Emirates	+ 0"
4	Matteo Moschetti (ITA)	Trek–Segafredo	+ 0"
5	Filippo Fiorelli (ITA)	Bardiani–CSF–Faizanè	+ 0"
6	Jakub Mareczko (ITA)	Vini Zabù	+ 0"
7	Andrea Guardini (ITA)	Amore & Vita	+ 0"
8	Manuel Belletti (ITA)	Eolo–Kometa	+ 0"
9	Francesco Di Felice (ITA)	MG.K vis VPM	+ 0"
10	Jhonatan Restrepo (COL)	Androni Giocattoli–Sidermec	+ 0"

General classification after Stage 1
Rank	Rider	Team	Time
1	Juan Sebastián Molano (COL)	UAE Team Emirates	4h 37' 11"
2	Vincenzo Albanese (ITA)	Eolo–Kometa	+ 4"
3	Maximiliano Richeze (ARG)	UAE Team Emirates	+ 6"
4	Matteo Zurlo (ITA)	Zalf Euromobil Fior	+ 7"
5	Charles-Étienne Chrétien (CAN)	Rally Cycling	+ 8"
6	Davide Gabburo (ITA)	Bardiani–CSF–Faizanè	+ 9"
7	Jacopo Cortese (ITA)	MG.K vis VPM	+ 9"
8	Matteo Moschetti (ITA)	Trek–Segafredo	+ 10"
9	Filippo Fiorelli (ITA)	Bardiani–CSF–Faizanè	+ 10"
10	Jakub Mareczko (ITA)	Vini Zabù	+ 10"

=== Stage 2 ===
29 September 2021 — Selinunte (Castelvetrano) to Mondello (Palermo), 173 km (107 mi)

Stage 2 Result
Rank	Rider	Team	Time
1	Juan Sebastián Molano (COL)	UAE Team Emirates	4h 25' 41"
2	Matteo Moschetti (ITA)	Trek–Segafredo	+ 0"
3	Jakub Mareczko (ITA)	Vini Zabù	+ 0"
4	Emanuele Onesti (ITA)	Giotti Victoria–Savini Due	+ 0"
5	Manuel Belletti (ITA)	Eolo–Kometa	+ 0"
6	Francesco Carollo (ITA)	MG.K vis VPM	+ 0"
7	Samuele Zambelli (ITA)	Androni Giocattoli–Sidermec	+ 0"
8	Nicolas Nesi (ITA)	D'Amico–UM Tools	+ 0"
9	Omer Goldstein (ISR)	Israel Start-Up Nation	+ 0"
10	Mattia Bais (ITA)	Androni Giocattoli–Sidermec	+ 0"

General classification after Stage 2
Rank	Rider	Team	Time
1	Juan Sebastián Molano (COL)	UAE Team Emirates	9h 02' 42"
2	Matteo Moschetti (ITA)	Trek–Segafredo	+ 14"
3	Vincenzo Albanese (ITA)	Eolo–Kometa	+ 14"
4	Jakub Mareczko (ITA)	Vini Zabù	+ 16"
5	Maximiliano Richeze (ARG)	UAE Team Emirates	+ 16"
6	Davide Gabburo (ITA)	Bardiani–CSF–Faizanè	+ 16"
7	Matteo Zurlo (ITA)	Zalf Euromobil Fior	+ 17"
8	David de la Cruz (ESP)	UAE Team Emirates	+ 18"
9	Charles-Étienne Chrétien (CAN)	Rally Cycling	+ 18"
10	Romain Bardet (FRA)	Team DSM	+ 19"

=== Stage 3 ===
30 September 2021 — Termini Imerese to Caronia, 180 km (110 mi)

Stage 3 Result
Rank	Rider	Team	Time
1	Alejandro Valverde (ESP)	Movistar Team	4h 42' 29"
2	Alessandro Covi (ITA)	UAE Team Emirates	+ 0"
3	Jhonatan Restrepo (COL)	Androni Giocattoli–Sidermec	+ 0"
4	Simone Velasco (ITA)	Gazprom–RusVelo	+ 0"
5	Romain Bardet (FRA)	Team DSM	+ 0"
6	Cristian Scaroni (ITA)	Gazprom–RusVelo	+ 0"
7	Lorenzo Fortunato (ITA)	Eolo–Kometa	+ 0"
8	Brandon McNulty (USA)	UAE Team Emirates	+ 0"
9	Alessio Martinelli (ITA)	Team Colpack–Ballan	+ 0"
10	Niklas Eg (DEN)	Trek–Segafredo	+ 0"

General classification after Stage 3
Rank	Rider	Team	Time
1	Alejandro Valverde (ESP)	Movistar Team	13h 45' 18"
2	Alessandro Covi (ITA)	UAE Team Emirates	+ 7"
3	Jhonatan Restrepo (COL)	Androni Giocattoli–Sidermec	+ 9"
4	Davide Gabburo (ITA)	Bardiani–CSF–Faizanè	+ 9"
5	Romain Bardet (FRA)	Team DSM	+ 12"
6	Simone Velasco (ITA)	Gazprom–RusVelo	+ 13"
7	Mattia Bais (ITA)	Androni Giocattoli–Sidermec	+ 13"
8	Alessio Martinelli (ITA)	Team Colpack–Ballan	+ 13"
9	Cristian Scaroni (ITA)	Gazprom–RusVelo	+ 13"
10	Vincenzo Nibali (ITA)	Trek–Segafredo	+ 13"

=== Stage 4 ===
1 October 2021 — Sant'Agata di Militello to Mascali, 180 km (110 mi)

Stage 4 Result
Rank	Rider	Team	Time
1	Vincenzo Nibali (ITA)	Trek–Segafredo	4h 24' 29"
2	Simone Ravanelli (ITA)	Androni Giocattoli–Sidermec	+ 49"
3	Alessandro Covi (ITA)	UAE Team Emirates	+ 49"
4	Romain Bardet (FRA)	Team DSM	+ 49"
5	Jhonatan Restrepo (COL)	Androni Giocattoli–Sidermec	+ 49"
6	Alejandro Valverde (ESP)	Movistar Team	+ 49"
7	Simone Velasco (ITA)	Gazprom–RusVelo	+ 49"
8	Lorenzo Fortunato (ITA)	Eolo–Kometa	+ 49"
9	Thymen Arensman (NED)	Team DSM	+ 49"
10	David de la Cruz (ESP)	UAE Team Emirates	+ 49"

General classification after Stage 4
Rank	Rider	Team	Time
1	Vincenzo Nibali (ITA)	Trek–Segafredo	18h 09' 50"
2	Alejandro Valverde (ESP)	Movistar Team	+ 46"
3	Alessandro Covi (ITA)	UAE Team Emirates	+ 49"
4	Jhonatan Restrepo (COL)	Androni Giocattoli–Sidermec	+ 55"
5	Romain Bardet (FRA)	Team DSM	+ 58"
6	Simone Velasco (ITA)	Gazprom–RusVelo	+ 59"
7	Thymen Arensman (NED)	Team DSM	+ 59"
8	Lorenzo Fortunato (ITA)	Eolo–Kometa	+ 59"
9	Niklas Eg (DEN)	Trek–Segafredo	+ 59"
10	Simone Ravanelli (ITA)	Androni Giocattoli–Sidermec	+ 1' 03"

== Classification leadership table ==
Classification leadership by stage
Stage	Winner	General classification	Points classification	Mountains classification	Young rider classification	Team classification
1	Juan Sebastián Molano	Juan Sebastián Molano	Juan Sebastián Molano	Charles-Étienne Chrétien	Vincenzo Albanese	Bardiani–CSF–Faizanè
2	Juan Sebastián Molano	Juan Sebastián Molano	Juan Sebastián Molano	Stefano Gandin	Matteo Moschetti	Bardiani–CSF–Faizanè
3	Alejandro Valverde	Alejandro Valverde	Juan Sebastián Molano	Ben King	Alessandro Covi	Androni Giocattoli–Sidermec
4	Vincenzo Nibali	Vincenzo Nibali	Juan Sebastián Molano	Cristian Scaroni	Alessandro Covi	Trek–Segafredo
Final		Vincenzo Nibali	Juan Sebastián Molano	Cristian Scaroni	Alessandro Covi	Trek–Segafredo

- On stage 2, Maximiliano Richeze, who was third in the points classification, wore the cyclamen jersey, because first-placed Juan Sebastián Molano wore the red-and-yellow jersey as the leader of the general classification and second-placed Vincenzo Albanese wore the white-and-blue jersey as the leader of the young rider classification. On stage 3, Jakub Mareczko wore the cyclamen jersey for the same reason, though with Matteo Moschetti wearing the white-and-blue jersey.

== Final classification standings ==
Legend
Denotes the leader of the general classification	Denotes the leader of the mountains classification
Denotes the leader of the points classification	Denotes the leader of the young rider classification

=== General classification ===
Final general classification (1–10)
Rank	Rider	Team	Time
1	Vincenzo Nibali (ITA)	Trek–Segafredo	18h 09' 50"
2	Alejandro Valverde (ESP)	Movistar Team	+ 46"
3	Alessandro Covi (ITA)	UAE Team Emirates	+ 49"
4	Jhonatan Restrepo (COL)	Androni Giocattoli–Sidermec	+ 55"
5	Romain Bardet (FRA)	Team DSM	+ 58"
6	Simone Velasco (ITA)	Gazprom–RusVelo	+ 59"
7	Thymen Arensman (NED)	Team DSM	+ 59"
8	Lorenzo Fortunato (ITA)	Eolo–Kometa	+ 59"
9	Niklas Eg (DEN)	Trek–Segafredo	+ 59"
10	Simone Ravanelli (ITA)	Androni Giocattoli–Sidermec	+ 1' 03"

=== Points classification ===
Final points classification (1–10)
Rank	Rider	Team	Points
1	Juan Sebastián Molano (COL)	UAE Team Emirates	24
2	Alejandro Valverde (ESP)	Movistar Team	23
3	Alessandro Covi (ITA)	UAE Team Emirates	18
4	Romain Bardet (FRA)	Team DSM	16
5	Jhonatan Restrepo (COL)	Androni Giocattoli–Sidermec	15
6	Vincenzo Nibali (ITA)	Trek–Segafredo	12
7	Simone Velasco (ITA)	Gazprom–RusVelo	11
8	Simone Ravanelli (ITA)	Androni Giocattoli–Sidermec	10
9	Vincenzo Albanese (ITA)	Eolo–Kometa	10
10	Maximiliano Richeze (ARG)	UAE Team Emirates	8

=== Mountains classification ===
Final mountains classification (1–10)
Rank	Rider	Team	Points
1	Cristian Scaroni (ITA)	Gazprom–RusVelo	45
2	Alejandro Valverde (ESP)	Movistar Team	32
3	Ben King (USA)	Rally Cycling	30
4	Vincenzo Nibali (ITA)	Trek–Segafredo	30
5	Alessandro Covi (ITA)	UAE Team Emirates	21
6	David de la Cruz (ESP)	UAE Team Emirates	21
7	Lorenzo Fortunato (ITA)	Eolo–Kometa	19
8	Chris Hamilton (AUS)	Team DSM	19
9	Romain Bardet (FRA)	Team DSM	12
10	Antonio Nibali (ITA)	Trek–Segafredo	12

=== Young rider classification ===
Final young rider classification (1–10)
Rank	Rider	Team	Time
1	Alessandro Covi (ITA)	UAE Team Emirates	18h 10' 39"
2	Thymen Arensman (NED)	Team DSM	+ 10"
3	Lorenzo Fortunato (ITA)	Eolo–Kometa	+ 10"
4	Mattia Bais (ITA)	Androni Giocattoli–Sidermec	+ 1' 30"
5	Omer Goldstein (ISR)	Israel Start-Up Nation	+ 2' 33"
6	Sergio Martín (ESP)	Caja Rural–Seguros RGA	+ 3' 39"
7	Daniel Muñoz (COL)	Androni Giocattoli–Sidermec	+ 3' 56"
8	Alessio Martinelli (ITA)	Team Colpack–Ballan	+ 4' 30"
9	Raul Colombo (ITA)	Work Service–Marchiol–Vega	+ 5' 17"
10	Cristian Scaroni (ITA)	Gazprom–RusVelo	+ 10' 21"

=== Team classification ===
Final team classification (1–10)
Rank	Team	Time
1	Trek–Segafredo	54h 32' 05"
2	Androni Giocattoli–Sidermec	+ 1' 52"
3	Team DSM	+ 5' 21"
4	Movistar Team	+ 9' 36"
5	Israel Start-Up Nation	+ 10' 10"
6	UAE Team Emirates	+ 11' 48"
7	Euskaltel–Euskadi	+ 16' 42"
8	Eolo–Kometa	+ 18' 14"
9	Gazprom–RusVelo	+ 20' 48"
10	Rally Cycling	+ 30' 35"
