= Carlos Quintero (cyclist) =

Colombian cyclist

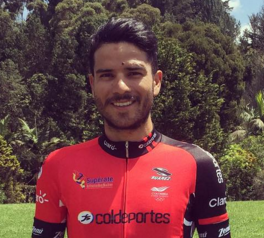
- Quintero in 2016

Personal information
- Full name: Carlos Julián Quintero Noreña
- Born: 5 March 1986 (age 40) Villamaría, Caldas, Colombia
- Height: 1.78 m (5 ft 10 in)
- Weight: 63 kg (139 lb; 9.9 st)

Cycling career
- Sport: Cycling
- Discipline: Road
- Role: Rider
- Rider type: All-rounder

Amateur teams
- 2006–2007: Futura–Matricardi
- 2008–2010: Monsummanese Bedogni Praga Natalini
- 2011: GW–Shimano
- 2016: Coldeportes–Claro
- 2017: Orgullo Paisa
- 2017: Stradalli Cycle–Saffeti
- 2024: Avinal - Carmen de Viboral
- 2025: BKR Cycling Team

Professional teams
- 2011: Colombia es Pasión–Café de Colombia
- 2012–2015: Colombia–Coldeportes
- 2016: China Continental Team of Gansu Bank
- 2018: Orgullo Paisa
- 2019: Team Manzana Postobón
- 2019: Ningxia Sports Lottery Livall Gusto
- 2020–2021: Terengganu Inc. TSG

Carlos Julián Quintero Noreña (born 5 March 1986) is a Colombian racing cyclist, who currently rides for US club team BKR Cycling Team. Quintero has also competed for the club team Avinal - Carmen de Viboral, UCI Continental team Terengganu Cycling Team, Colombia es Pasión–Café de Colombia/Team Manzana Postobón, Colombia, China Continental Team of Gansu Bank, Orgullo Paisa and Ningxia Sports Lottery Livall Gusto professional teams; he contested the 2013 Giro d'Italia, the 2014 Giro d'Italia and the 2015 Vuelta a España with Colombia.

== Major results ==
2009
6th Ruota d'Oro
8th Trofeo Edil C
9th Gran Premio San Giuseppe
2010
3rd Trofeo Edil C
4th Ruota d'Oro
2011
4th Road race, Pan American Road Championships
2012
1st Mountains classification, Four Days of Dunkirk
2013
7th GP Industria & Artigianato di Larciano
2014
10th Overall Tour de Langkawi
2015
1st Mountains classification, Tirreno–Adriatico
4th Coppa Bernocchi
10th Overall Settimana Internazionale di Coppi e Bartali
Combativity award Stage 14 Vuelta a España
2019
1st Stage 1 Vuelta a Asturias
2nd Klasika Primavera
3rd Overall Tour of Fuzhou
8th Overall Tour of Quanzhou Bay
2020
5th Overall Tour du Rwanda
9th Overall Tour de Langkawi
2021
1st Grand Prix Velo Alanya
1st Grand Prix Gündoğmuş
3rd Overall Tour of Mevlana

=== Grand Tour general classification results timeline ===
| Grand Tour | 2013 | 2014 | 2015 |
|---|---|---|---|
| Giro d'Italia | DNF | 117 | — |
| Tour de France | — | — | — |
| Vuelta a España | — | — | 92 |

Legend
| — | Did not compete |
| DNF | Did not finish |
