= Joseph Biziyaremye =

Rwandan cyclist (born 1988)

Personal information
- Full name: Joseph Biziyaremye
- Born: 1 January 1988 (age 38)

Cycling career
- Sport: Cycling
- Current team: Retired
- Discipline: Road
- Role: Rider

Amateur teams
- 2013: Rwanda Akagera
- 2014: Rwanda Karisimbi
- 2015: Rwanda Akagera
- 2016: Cine Elmay

Joseph Biziyaremye (born 1 January 1988) is a Rwandan former cyclist.

== Major results ==
2011
1st Stage 8 Tour du Rwanda
2012
3rd Overall Kwita Izina Cycling Tour

1st Stage 3

2013
1st Stage 6 Tour of the Democratic Republic of Congo
2014
4th Overall Tour du Rwanda

1st Stage 5

2015
1st Road race, National Road Championships
7th Overall Tour du Rwanda
10th Overall Tour de Côte d'Ivoire
10th Overall Tour de Constantine
2016
3rd Road race, National Road Championships
