= Simone Ravanelli =

Italian cyclist

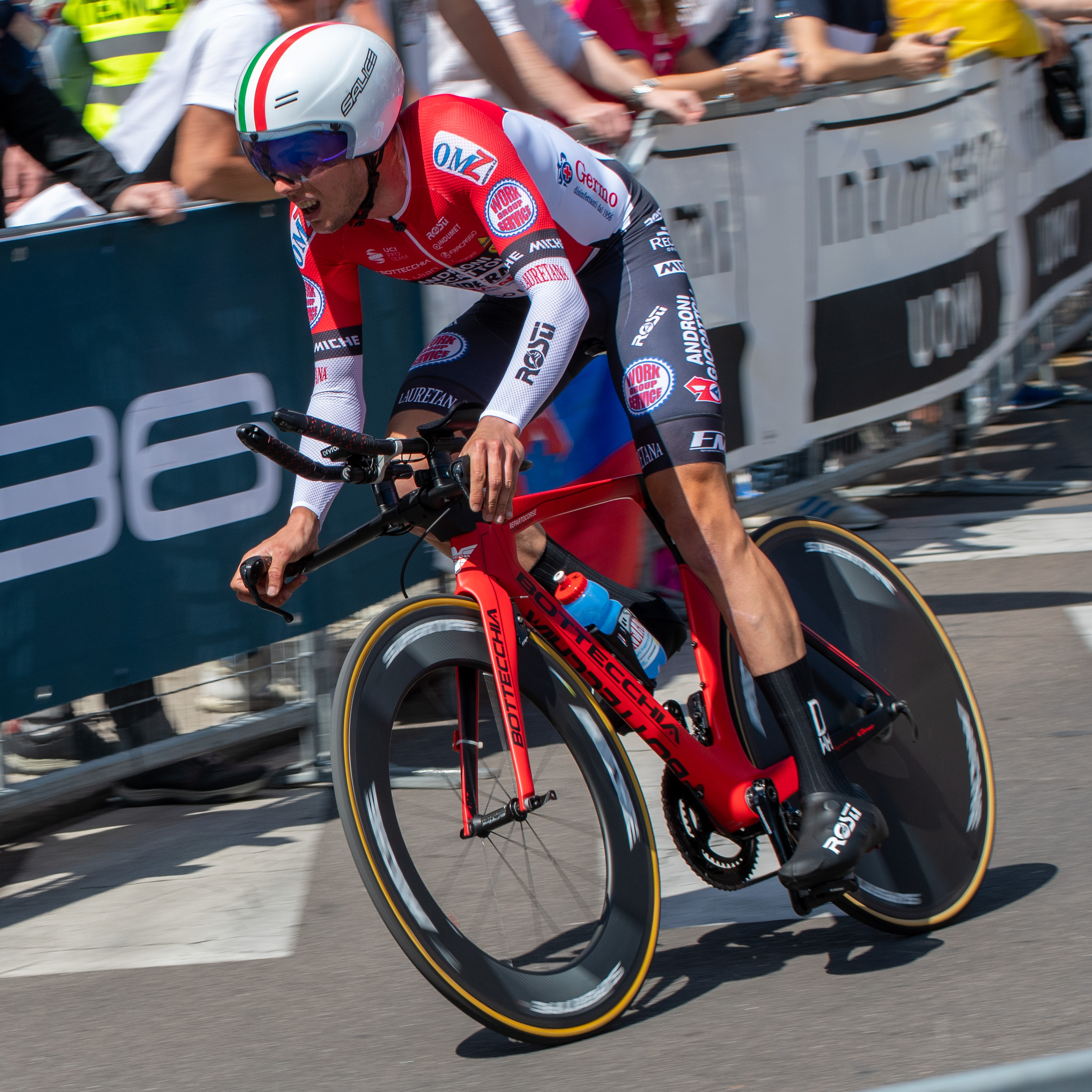

Personal information
- Born: 4 July 1995 (age 31) Almenno San Salvatore, Italy

Cycling career
- Sport: Cycling
- Current team: GW Erco SportFitness
- Discipline: Road
- Role: Rider

Amateur team
- 2014–2015: Palazzago

Professional teams
- 2016–2017: Unieuro–Wilier
- 2018–2019: Biesse–Carrera Gavardo
- 2019: Androni Giocattoli–Sidermec (stagiaire)
- 2020–: Androni Giocattoli–Sidermec

Simone Ravanelli (born 4 July 1995) is an Italian cyclist, who currently rides for UCI ProTeam GW Erco SportFitness. In October 2020, he was named in the startlist for the 2020 Giro d'Italia.

== Major results ==
2014
1st Young rider classification Giro della Valle d'Aosta
2015
7th Overall Giro della Valle d'Aosta
2016
2nd Overall Tour of Bulgaria
3rd GP Kranj
7th Coppa Città di Offida
2017
8th Trofeo Città di San Vendemiano
2018
1st Trofeo Alcide Degasperi
1st Coppa Collecchio
2nd Giro del Medio Brenta
3rd Trofeo Città di Brescia
5th Overall Giro della Regione Friuli Venezia Giulia
2019
1st Giro del Medio Brenta
3rd Giro dell'Appennino
4th GP Slovenian Istria
5th Overall Tour de la Mirabelle
5th Trofeo Città di Brescia
8th GP Adria Mobil
9th Overall Istrian Spring Trophy
2020
4th Overall Tour du Rwanda
2021
9th Overall Tour de Savoie Mont-Blanc
10th Overall Giro di Sicilia

=== Grand Tour general classification results timeline ===
Grand Tour	2020	2021	2022
Giro d'Italia	74	71	91
Tour de France	—	—	—
Vuelta a España	—	—	—

Legend
—	Did not compete
DNF	Did not finish
