= Abraham Ruhumuriza =

Rwandan cyclist (born 1979)

Personal information
- Born: 28 August 1979 (age 47)

Cycling career
- Sport: Cycling
- Current team: Retired
- Discipline: Road
- Role: Rider

Amateur teams
- 2011–2013: Rwanda Karisimbi
- 2014–2015: Rwanda Akagera

Abraham Ruhumuriza (born 28 August 1979) is a Rwandan former cyclist. His main success was in the Tour du Rwanda, which he won five times between 2002 and 2007.

== Major results ==
2002
1st Overall Tour du Rwanda
2003
1st Overall Tour du Rwanda
2004
1st Overall Tour du Rwanda
2005
1st Overall Tour du Rwanda
2007
1st Overall Tour du Rwanda
7th Road race, African Road Championships
2008
1st Stage 5 Tour du Rwanda
2009
1st Overall Kwita Izina Cycling Tour
5th Overall Tour du Rwanda
2010
1st Overall Kwita Izina Cycling Tour
7th Overall Tour du Cameroun

1st Stages 4 & 7

2011
3rd Road race, National Road Championships
5th Overall Tour du Rwanda
2012
1st Overall Kwita Izina Cycling Tour

1st Stage 2

2015
3rd Road race, National Road Championships
6th Overall Tour du Cameroun
2016
10th Overall Tour de Côte d'Ivoire
