= Diane Ingabire =

Rwandan cyclist (born 2001)

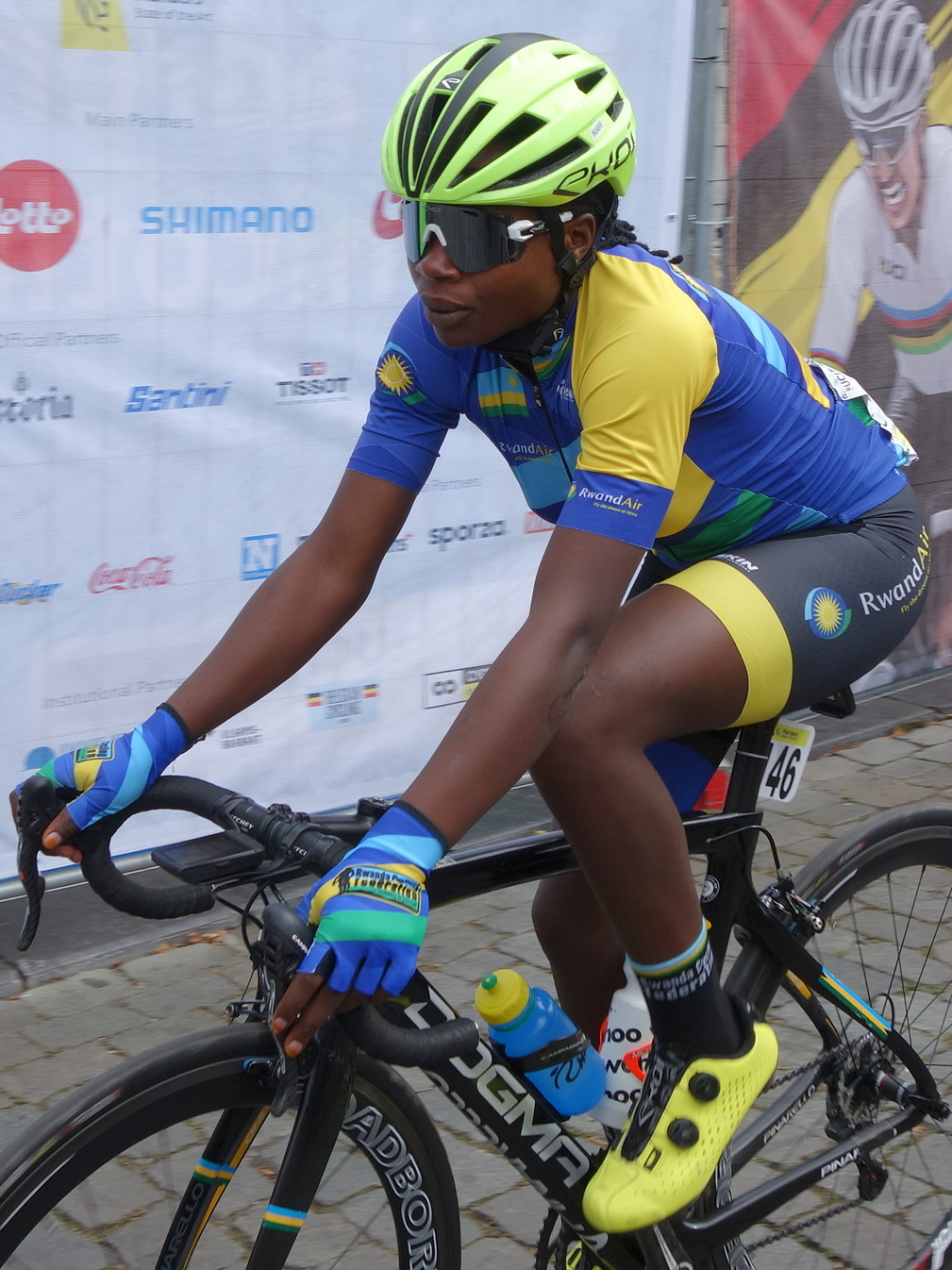
- Ingabire in 2021

Personal information
- Born: 17 July 2001 (age 25)

Cycling career
- Sport: Cycling
- Current team: Canyon–SRAM Generation
- Discipline: Road
- Role: Rider

Professional team
- 2023–: Canyon–SRAM Generation

Major wins
- One-day races and Classics National Time Trial Championships (2022, 2023, 2024) National Road Race Championships (2022, 2023, 2024)

Diane Ingabire (born 17 July 2001) is a Rwandan road racing cyclist, who currently rides for UCI Women's Continental Team Canyon–SRAM Generation. She competed in the time trial at the 2024 Summer Olympics, finishing 35th, as well as the road race which she did not finish.

She competed at the 2021 and 2023 UCI Road World Championships.

She won multiple medals at the African Cycling Championships in 2021 and 2023.

== Major results ==
2019
African Junior Road Championships

2nd Time trial
5th Road race

2021
African Road Championships

2nd Mixed team relay
2nd Team time trial
5th Road race
7th Time trial

2022
National Road Championships

1st Road race
1st Time trial

6th Time trial, African Road Championships
2023
African Under-23 Road Championships

1st Road race
2nd Time trial

National Road Championships

1st Road race
1st Time trial

African Road Championships

2nd Mixed team relay
3rd Team time trial
4th Road race

2024
3rd Criterium, African Games
National Road Championships

1st Road race
1st Time trial
