= Jeanne d'Arc Girubuntu =

Rwandan cyclist

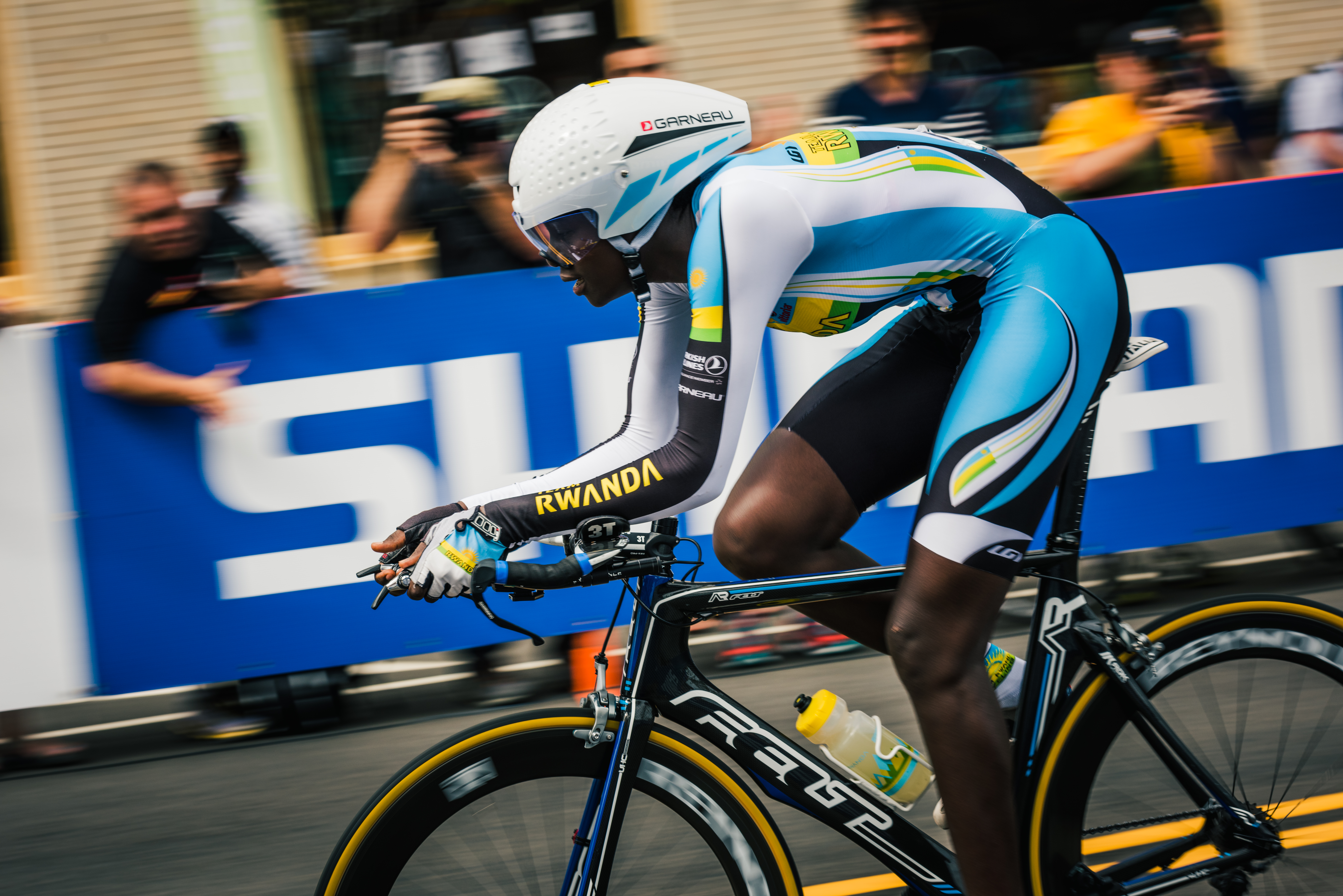
- Girubuntu at the 2015 UCI Road World Championships

Personal information
- Full name: Jeanne d'Arc Girubuntu
- Born: 6 May 1995 (age 31) Rwanda

Cycling career
- Sport: Cycling
- Discipline: Road
- Role: Rider

Jeanne d'Arc Girubuntu (born 6 May 1995) is a Rwandan road cyclist. She became Rwandan national road race and time trial champion in 2014. In 2015, she was invited to train at the World Cycling Centre in Switzerland for three months. She was the first Rwandan female rider to do so, and the 1000th rider to train at the WCC.

== Major results ==
2013
8th Road race, African Junior Road Championships
2014
National Road Championships

1st Road race
1st Time trial

2015
4th Time trial, African Games
African Road Championships

5th Road race
6th Time trial

2016
National Road Championships

1st Road race
1st Time trial

2nd Time trial, African Road Championships
2017
3rd Time trial, National Road Championships
8th Time trial, African Road Championships
2018
3rd Team time trial, African Road Championships
