= Jhonatan Restrepo =

Colombian bicycle racer

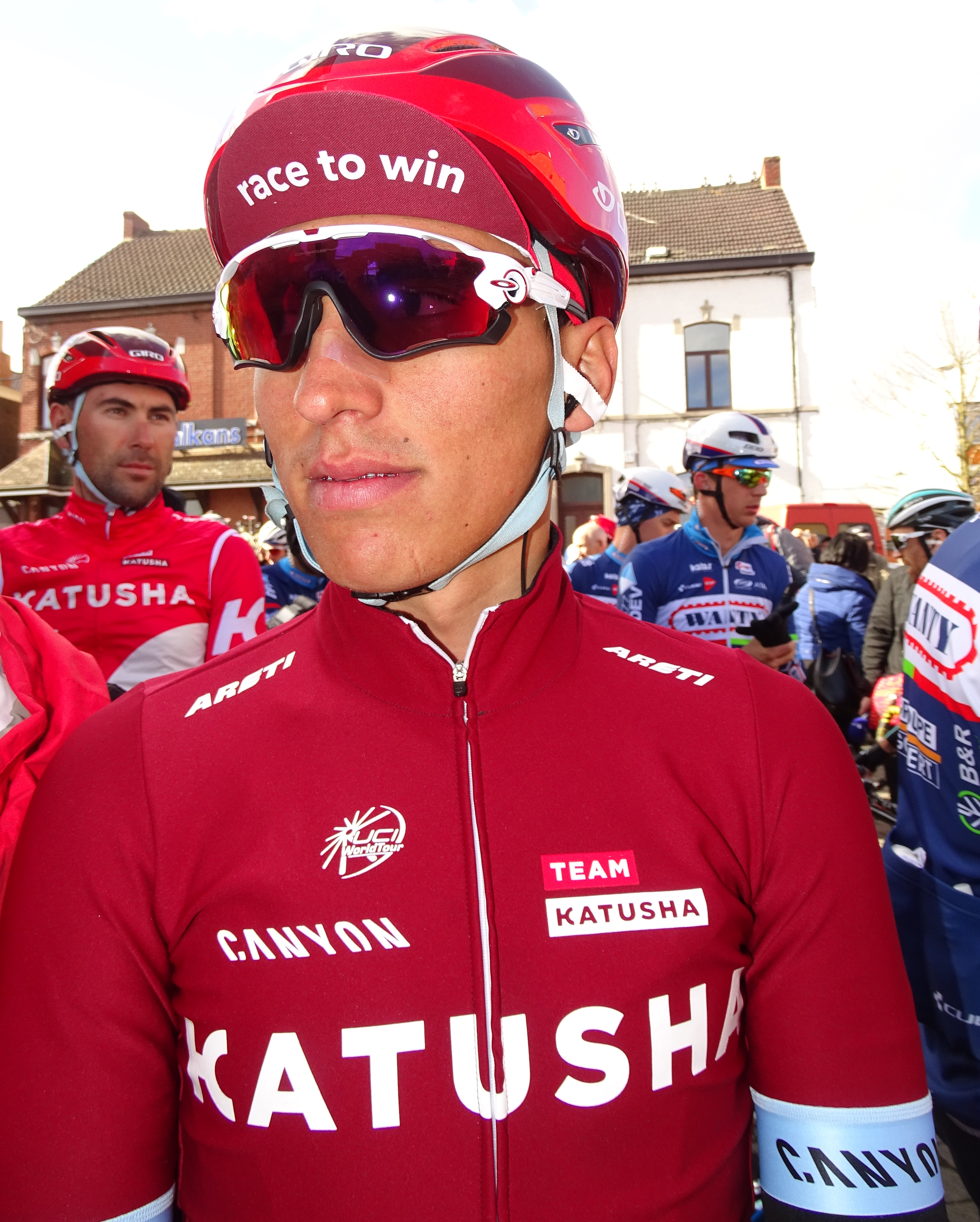
- Restrepo in 2016 Le Samyn

Personal information
- Full name: Jhonatan Restrepo Valencia
- Nicknames: Pácora, El Rayo
- Born: November 28, 1994 (age 31) Pácora, Colombia
- Height: 1.71 m (5 ft 7 in)
- Weight: 69 kg (152 lb)

Cycling career
- Sport: Cycling
- Current team: Orgullo Paisa
- Disciplines: Road; Track
- Role: Rider
- Rider type: All-rounder

Amateur team
- 2014–2015: Coldeportes–Claro

Professional teams
- 2015: Team Katusha (stagiaire)
- 2016–2018: Team Katusha
- 2019: Team Manzana Postobón
- 2020–2023: Androni Giocattoli–Sidermec
- 2024: Polti–Kometa
- 2025–: Orgullo Paisa
Medal record
Representing Colombia
Men's track cycling
Pan American Games
Gold medal – first place	2015 Toronto	Team pursuit
Pan American Championships
Gold medal – first place	2014 Aguascalientes	Team pursuit
Gold medal – first place	2015 Santiago	Individual pursuit
Gold medal – first place	2015 Santiago	Team pursuit
Silver medal – second place	2013 Mexico City	Team pursuit
Silver medal – second place	2014 Aguascalientes	Madison
Silver medal – second place	2015 Santiago	Madison
Bronze medal – third place	2013 Mexico City	Individual pursuit
Men's road cycling
Pan American Championships
Gold medal – first place	2015 León	Under-23 road race

Jhonatan Restrepo Valencia (born November 28, 1994) is a Colombian cyclist, who currently rides for UCI Continental team Orgullo Paisa.

== Career ==
Born in Pácora, Caldas, Restrepo was a competitive swimmer during his youth, winning four national titles in Colombia.

According to Restrepo, he and his manager contacted a number of UCI WorldTeams via Facebook from December 2014 with a view to gaining a professional contract, and after becoming Pan-American Under-23 Champion in 2015, he received an offer from Katusha for a position as a stagiaire that season, subsequently remaining with the team for 2016. He participated in the 2015 Pan American Games, placing first in the team pursuit. He was named in the startlist for the 2016 Vuelta a España.

After three seasons with Katusha, Restrepo joined Colombian team Team Manzana Postobón for the 2019 season, before moving to Italian squad Androni Giocattoli–Sidermec the following year. In February of that year, he took his first professional wins at the Tour du Rwanda, winning four stages in total. In October, he competed in the 2020 Giro d'Italia. He stayed with the team through 2023, winning the Giro della Città Metropolitana di Reggio Calabria in his final season before joining another Italian team, Polti–Kometa, in 2024. While riding for the Colombian national team in February 2024, he took the win on stage six of the Tour Colombia.

== Major results ==
2013
1st Stage 1 Vuelta de la Juventud de Colombia
Pan American Track Championships

2nd Team pursuit
3rd Individual pursuit

2nd Individual pursuit, Bolivarian Games
2014
Pan American Track Championships

1st Team pursuit
2nd Madison (with Jordan Parra)

2015
1st Team pursuit, Pan American Games
Pan American Track Championships

1st Team pursuit
1st Individual pursuit
2nd Madison (with Juan Arango)

Pan American Under-23 Road Championships

1st Road race
5th Time trial

3rd Overall Vuelta de la Juventud de Colombia

1st Points classification
1st Stage 6

2016
Combativity award Stage 8 Vuelta a España
2017
2nd Vuelta a Murcia
4th Cadel Evans Great Ocean Road Race
10th Overall Tour Down Under

1st Young rider classification

2018
4th Gran Piemonte
2019
1st Mountains classification, Vuelta a Aragón
5th Overall Circuit de la Sarthe
7th Overall Tour of Turkey
8th Overall Vuelta a la Comunidad de Madrid
2020 (4 pro wins)
Vuelta al Táchira

1st Stages 3 & 5

6th Overall Tour du Rwanda

1st Stages 3, 5, 6 & 7 (ITT)

2021 (1)
1st Mountains classification, Boucles de la Mayenne
2nd Trofeo Matteotti
3rd Veneto Classic
4th Overall Giro di Sicilia
5th Overall Tour du Rwanda

1st Stage 7 (ITT)

7th Giro del Veneto
2022 (1)
1st Stage 3 Tour du Rwanda
2023 (1)
1st Giro della Città Metropolitana di Reggio Calabria
1st Stage 1 Vuelta al Tolima
2024 (2)
1st Stage 6 Tour Colombia
3rd Overall Tour du Rwanda

1st Stage 3

=== Grand Tour general classification results timeline ===
Grand Tour	2016	2017	2018	2019	2020
Giro d'Italia	—	—	—	—	103
Tour de France	—	—	—	—	—
Vuelta a España	128	—	105	—	—

Legend
—	Did not compete
DNF	Did not finish
