= Awet Gebremedhin =

Eritrean-born Swedish cyclist

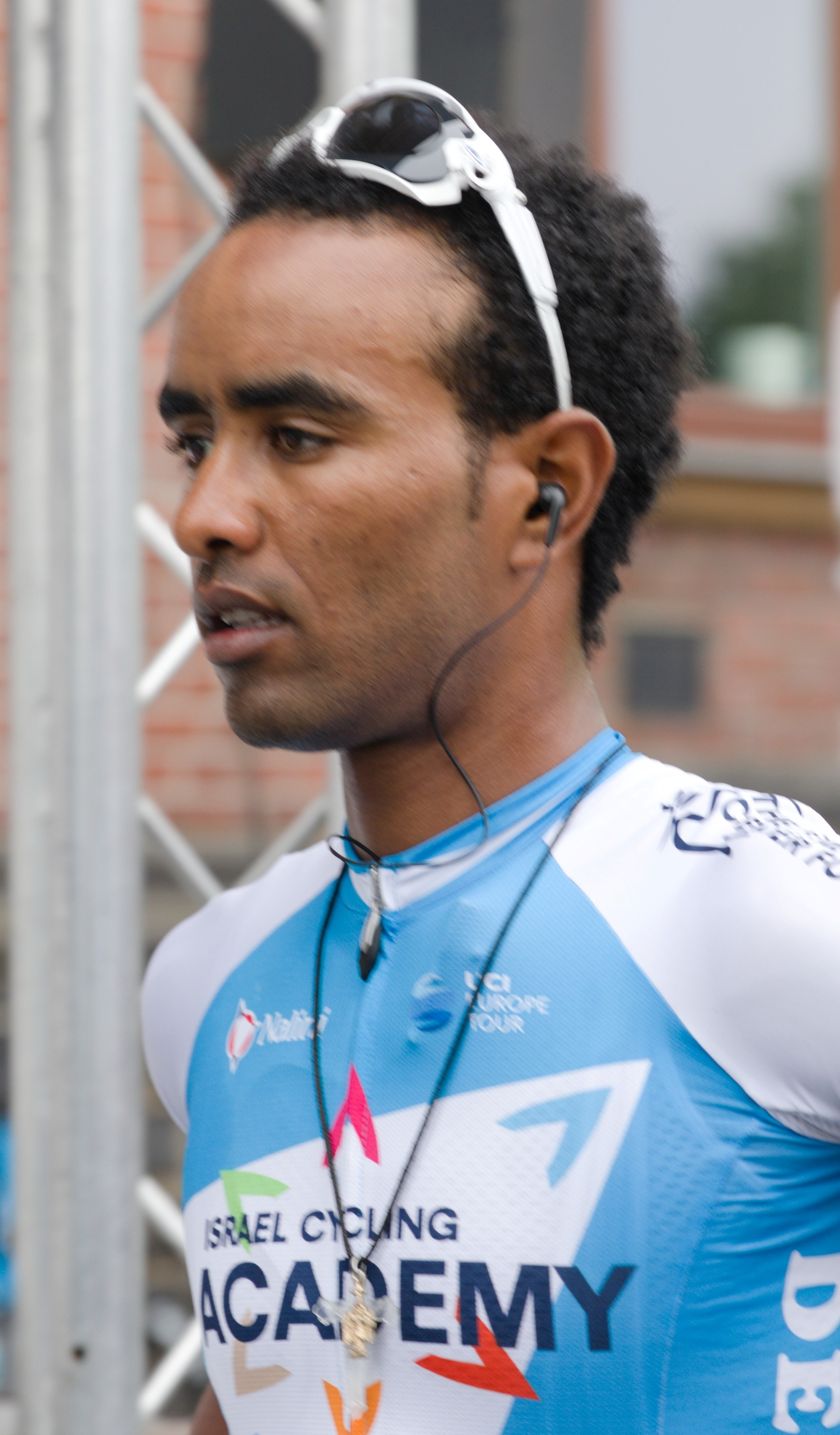
- Gebremedhin in 2018

Personal information
- Full name: Awet Gebremedhin Andemeskel
- Born: 5 February 1992 (age 34) Debarwa, Ethiopia
- Height: 1.76 m (5 ft 9 in)
- Weight: 59 kg (130 lb)

Cycling career
- Sport: Cycling
- Discipline: Road
- Role: Rider
- Rider type: Climber

Amateur team
- 2016: Marco Polo

Professional teams
- 2017: Kuwait–Cartucho.es
- 2018–2019: Israel Cycling Academy
- 2020: Israel Cycling Academy

Awet Gebremedhin Andemeskel (born 5 February 1992 in Kakebda) is an Eritrean-born Swedish cyclist, who most recently rode for UCI Continental team Israel Cycling Academy. In May 2019, he was named in the startlist for the 2019 Giro d'Italia.

== Major results ==
2013
2nd Overall Fenkel Northern Redsea
6th Overall Tour of Eritrea
2018
10th Prueba Villafranca de Ordizia
2019
4th Road race, National Road Championships
2020
7th Overall Tour du Rwanda

=== Grand Tour general classification results timeline ===
Grand Tour	2019
Giro d'Italia	128
Tour de France	—
Vuelta a España	—
