= Skol Adrien Cycling Academy =

Rwandan cycling team

Team information
- UCI code: SAC
- Registered: Rwanda
- Founded: 2020
- Discipline: Road
- Status: UCI Continental

Key personnel
- General manager: Winifred Kabega
- Team manager: Adrien Niyonshuti

Team name history
- 2020–: Skol Adrien Cycling Academy

Skol Adrien Cycling Academy is a Rwandan professional road bicycle racing team. The team was established in 2020 with UCI Continental status by former cyclist Adrien Niyonshuti to help develop young Rwandan cyclists.

== Team roster ==
As of 26 February 2021.

Rider	Date of birth
Fidel Dukuzumurenyi (RWA)	12 December 1996 (age 29)
Eugene Gashiramanga (RWA)	1 January 1996 (age 30)
Jean Eric Habimana (RWA)	1 January 2001 (age 25)
Seth Hakizimana (RWA)	27 May 1996 (age 30)
Swayibu Kagibwami (RWA)	1 January 2000 (age 26)
Moise Mugisha (RWA)	1 January 1997 (age 29)

Rider	Date of birth
Ramadhan Niringiyimana (RWA)	1 January 2001 (age 25)
Jean Pierre Niyonshuti (RWA)	25 November 2000 (age 25)
Jean Baptiste Nsabimana (RWA)	28 August 2001 (age 25)
Jean Bosco Nsengimana (RWA)	4 November 1992 (age 33)
Shemu Nsengiyumva (RWA)	1 January 1999 (age 27)
Nshimyumuremyi (RWA)	12 July 2000 (age 26)
