= Didier Munyaneza =

Rwandan cyclist (born 1998)

Personal information
- Full name: Didier Munyaneza
- Born: 1 January 1998 (age 28)

Cycling career
- Sport: Cycling
- Current team: Benediction Banafrica Team
- Discipline: Road
- Role: Rider

Amateur team
- 2016–2018: Benediction Cycling Team

Professional team
- 2019–: Benediction–Excel Energy

Didier Munyaneza (born 1 January 1998) is a Rwandan cyclist, who currently rides for UCI Continental team Benediction Banafrica Team.

== Major results ==
2017
2nd Time trial, National Under-23 Road Championships
8th Overall Tour of Rwanda
2018
1st Road race, National Road Championships
Africa Cup

2nd Team time trial
7th Road race

African Road Championships

3rd Under-23 road race
9th Road race

8th Overall Tour of Rwanda
9th Overall Tour de l'Espoir
2019
1st Overall Tour du Sénégal

1st Young rider classification

4th Overall Grand Prix Chantal Biya
8th Overall La Tropicale Amissa Bongo

1st Young rider classification

2020
8th Overall Grand Prix Chantal Biya
