= Muhazi District =

Muhazi
- Town and sector
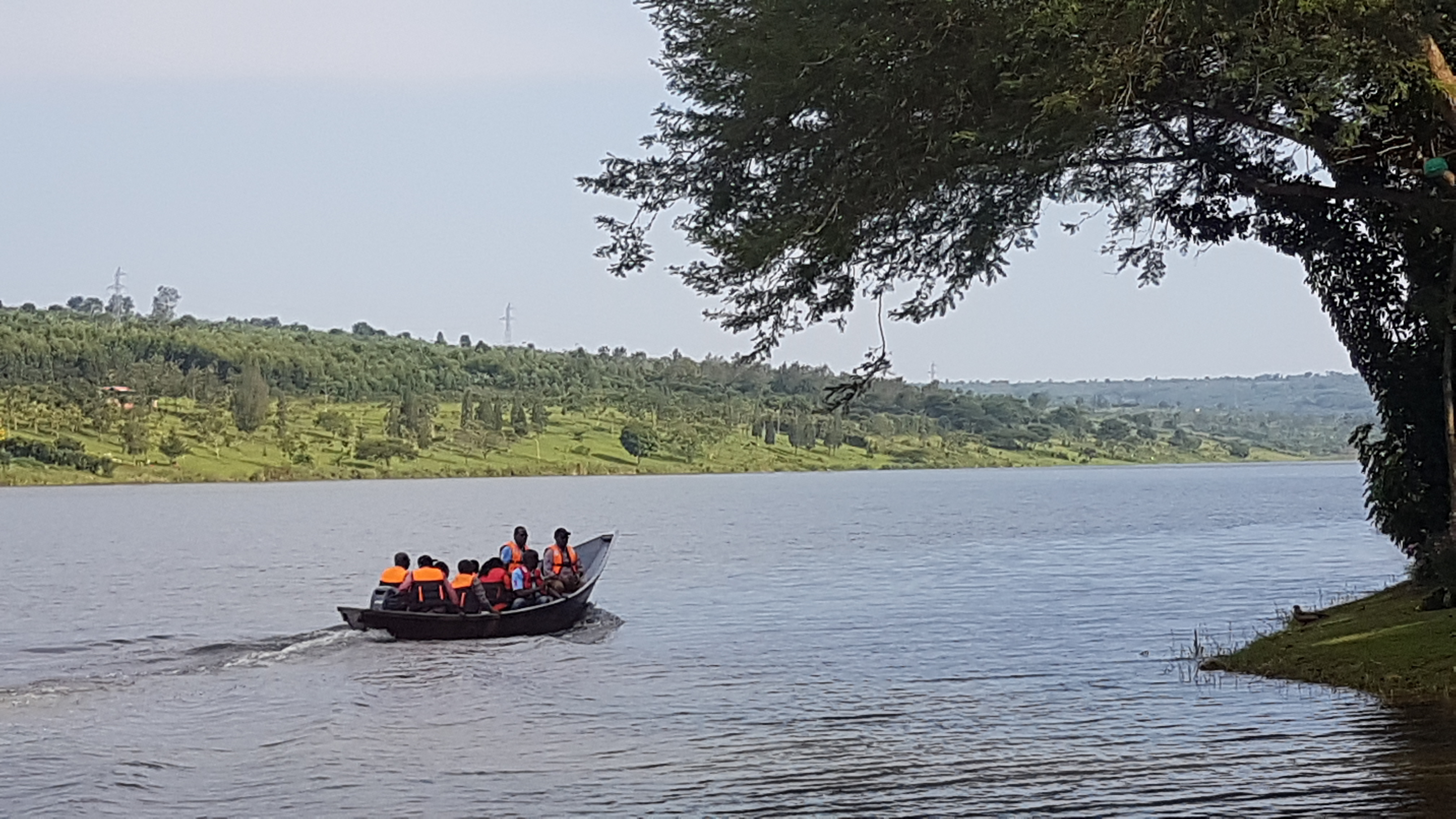
- Passenger tour boat on Lake Muhazi

- Location in Rwanda
- Coordinates: 1.89089°S 30.44927°E
- Country: Rwanda
- Province: Eastern Province
- District: Rwamagana District

Area
  - Town and sector: 57.6 km^{2} (22.2 sq mi)

Population (2022 census)
  - Town and sector: 53,482
  - Density: 929/km^{2} (2,400/sq mi)
  - Urban: 33,085

Muhazi is a town and sector in Rwamagana District, Eastern Province in Rwanda, with an area of 57.6 square kilometers.

== Population ==
Historical population
Year	Pop.	±% p.a.
2012	29,505	—
2022	53,482	+6.13%
Source: CityPopulation

== Sources ==
- "Districts of Rwanda". Statoids.
