= Patrick Schelling =

Swiss bicycle racer

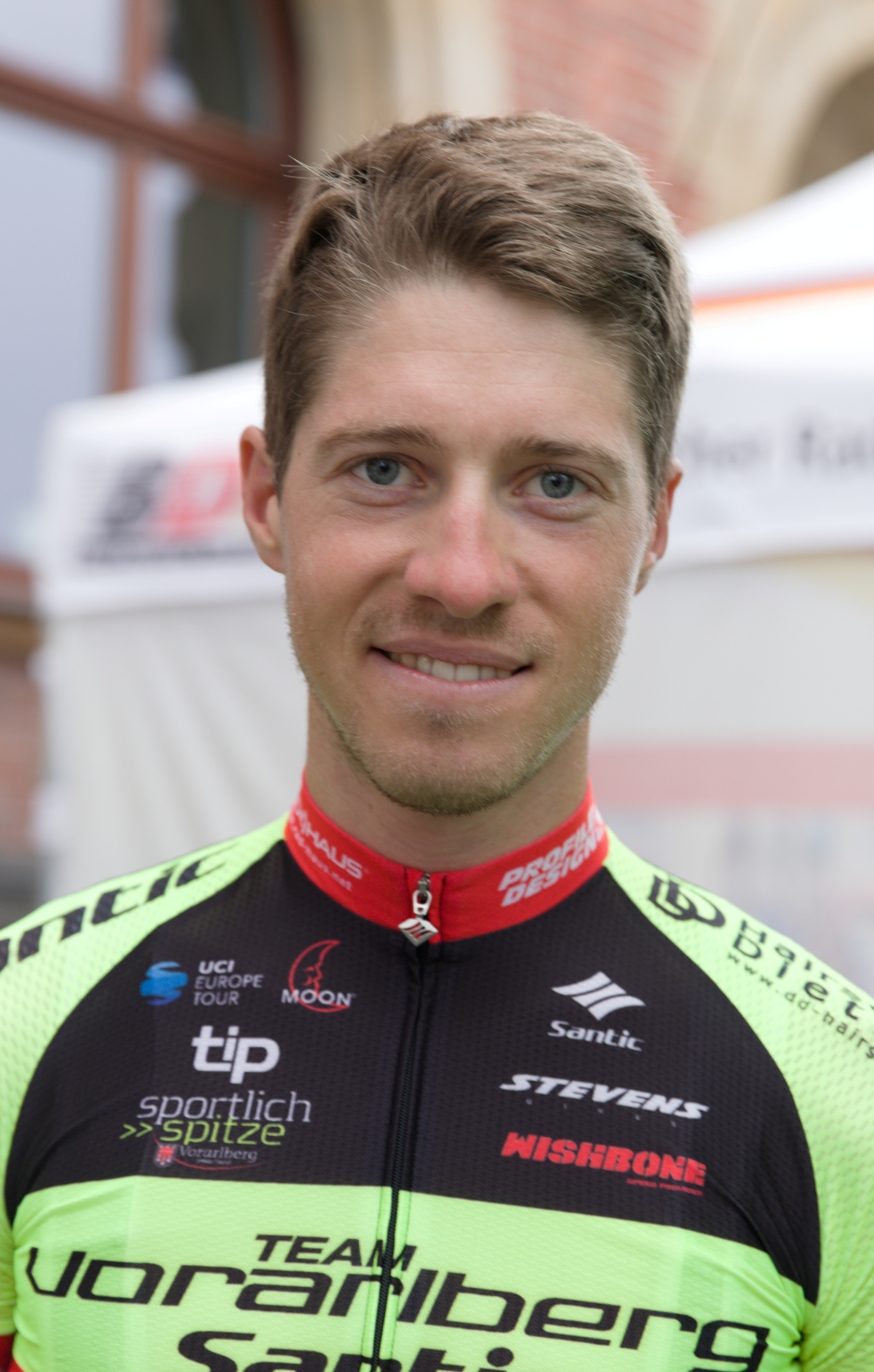
- Schelling at the 2018 Rund um Köln

Personal information
- Full name: Patrick Schelling
- Born: 1 May 1990 (age 36) Hemberg
- Height: 1.73 m (5 ft 8 in)
- Weight: 61 kg (134 lb)

Cycling career
- Sport: Cycling
- Discipline: Road
- Role: Rider

Professional teams
- 2010–2011: Price Your Bike
- 2012: Atlas Personal–Jakroo
- 2013–2015: IAM Cycling
- 2016–2019: Team Vorarlberg
- 2020: Israel Start-Up Nation

Patrick Schelling (born 1 May 1990 in Hemberg) is a former professional Swiss cyclist, who last rode for UCI WorldTeam Israel Start-Up Nation.

It was revealed in September 2020 that Schelling had tested positive for use of terbutaline, an unauthorised asthma drug, on stage 2 of the Tour du Rwanda on 24 February. As a result of the 'non-intentional anti-doping rule violation,' Schelling was stripped of his results from this race, including a third place overall finish, and was handed a four-month suspension that retroactively began on 18 May 2020. Schelling retired from professional cycling at the end of 2020.

== Major results ==
2011
2nd Road race, Summer Universiade
3rd Road race, National Under–23 Road Championships
2012
2nd Road race, National Under–23 Road Championships
2016
1st Overall Tour du Loir-et-Cher

1st Stage 4

2nd Croatia–Slovenia
3rd Overall Tour of Austria
4th Overall Tour of Hainan
2017
1st Stage 4 Okolo Jižních Čech
2nd Tour du Jura
8th Overall Flèche du Sud
8th Overall Tour of Hainan
2018
1st Prologue Tour de Hongrie
1st Stage 3 (ITT) Tour de Savoie Mont Blanc
National Road Championships

2nd Road race
5th Time trial

2019
4th Gran Premio di Lugano
5th Road race, National Road Championships
9th Overall Tour of Austria
2020
3rd Overall Tour of Hainan
~~3rd Overall Tour du Rwanda~~
8th Road race, National Road Championships
