= Kwita Izina Cycling Tour =

Race details
- Date: June
- Region: Rwanda
- Discipline: Road
- Competition: UCI Africa Tour
- Type: stage race

History
- First edition: 2009
- Editions: 4
- Final edition: 2012
- First winner: Abraham Ruhumuriza (RWA)
- Most wins: Abraham Ruhumuriza (RWA) (3 wins)
- Final winner: Abraham Ruhumuriza (RWA)

The Kwita Izina Cycling Tour was a multi-day road cycling race in Rwanda that was held annually from 2009 until 2012. It was part of UCI Africa Tour as a 2.2 event for the final two editions.

Three of the four editions of the race were won by Abraham Ruhumuriza, while the 2011 edition was won by Daniel Teklehaymanot of Eritrea.

== Winners ==
Year	Winner	Second	Third
2009	(Rwanda) Abraham Ruhumuriza	-	-
2010	(Rwanda) Abraham Ruhumuriza	-	-
2011	(Eritrea) Daniel Teklehaymanot	(Eritrea) Fregalsi Debesay	(Morocco) Adil Jelloul
2012	(Rwanda) Abraham Ruhumuriza	(Algeria) Azzedine Lagab	(Rwanda) Joseph Biziyaremye
