= Benediction Ignite =

Rwandan cycling team

Team information
- UCI code: BEX (2019); BIG (2020–)
- Registered: Rwanda
- Founded: 2005
- Status: National (2005–2018); UCI Continental (2019–)

Team name history
- 2005–2018 2019 2020–: Benediction Cycling Team; Benediction–Excel Energy; Benediction Ignite

Benediction Ignite is a professional road bicycle racing team which participates in elite races. The team was established in 2005, before becoming UCI registered in 2018, in preparation for the 2019 season.

The team roster previously featured a number of notable Rwandan cyclists: 2018 Rwandan cyclist of the year Patrick Byukusenge, 2015 Tour of Rwanda winner Jean Bosco Nsengimana, 2016 national road champion Bonaventure Uwizeyimana, 2017 national road champion Gasore Hategeka and reigning national champion Didier Munyaneza.

== Team roster ==
As of 8 February 2021.

Rider	Date of birth
Joseph Areruya (RWA)	1 January 1996 (age 30)
Patrick Byukusenge (RWA)	1 June 1991 (age 35)
Tshiyana Kamena (COD)	25 May 2000 (age 26)
Daniel Kinanira Ischara (COD)	30 October 1997 (age 28)
Eric Manizabayo (RWA)	28 August 1997 (age 29)

Rider	Date of birth
Didier Munyaneza (RWA)	1 January 1998 (age 28)
Yves Nkurunziza (RWA)	13 January 2000 (age 26)
Jean Claude Nzafashwanayo (RWA)	4 August 2000 (age 26)
Janvier Rugamba (RWA)	31 December 1998 (age 27)
Paul Uwiduhaye (RWA)	15 August 1997 (age 29)
