= 2022 Tour du Rwanda =

Rwandan cycling race

2022 UCI Africa Tour

Race details
- Dates: 20–27 February 2022
- Stages: 8
- Distance: 937.1 km (582.3 mi)
- Winning time: 23h 25' 34"

Results
Jersey awarded to the overall winner	Winner	Natnael Tesfatsion (ERI)	(Drone Hopper–Androni Giocattoli)
	Second	Anatoliy Budyak (UKR)	(Terengganu Polygon Cycling Team)
	Third	Jesse Ewart (IRL)	(Bike Aid)
Jersey awarded to the mountains classification winner	Mountains	Moise Mugisha (RWA)	(ProTouch)
Jersey awarded to the youth classification winner	Youth	Natnael Tesfatsion (ERI)	(Drone Hopper–Androni Giocattoli)
Jersey awarded to the sprints classification winner	Sprints	Sandy Dujardin (FRA)	(Team TotalEnergies)
Jersey awarded to the combativity classification winner	Combativity	Omer Goldstein (ISR)	(Israel–Premier Tech)
Jersey awarded to the team classification winner	Team	Bike Aid	

The 2022 Tour du Rwanda was a road cycling stage race that took place from 20 and 27 February 2022 in Rwanda. The race was rated as a category 2.1 event on the 2022 UCI Africa Tour calendar, and was the 25th edition of the Tour du Rwanda.

After the 2021 edition was postponed to early May due to the COVID-19 pandemic, the race returned to its usual late-February timeslot.

== Teams ==
One of the 18 UCI WorldTeams, five UCI ProTeams, nine UCI Continental teams, and four national teams make up the 19 teams that participated in the race. Of these teams, 14 entered a full squad of five riders, while the other five teams (B&B Hotels–KTM, Burgos BH, Team Novo Nordisk, Terengganu Polygon Cycling Team, and Wildlife Generation Pro Cycling) entered four riders each. Team TotalEnergies was also reduced to four riders with one late non-starter. In total, 89 riders started the race, of which 65 finished.

UCI WorldTeams

- Israel–Premier Tech

UCI ProTeams

- B&B Hotels–KTM
- Burgos BH
- Drone Hopper–Androni Giocattoli
- Team Novo Nordisk
- Team TotalEnergies

UCI Continental Teams

- Benediction Ignite
- Bike Aid
- Grant Thornton–Bike Zone
- ProTouch
- Saris Rouvy Sauerland Team
- Tarteletto–Isorex
- Team Coop
- Terengganu Polygon Cycling Team
- Wildlife Generation Pro Cycling

National Teams

- Algeria
- Great Britain
- Morocco
- Rwanda

== Route ==
The complete route of the 2022 Tour du Rwanda was revealed on 30 November 2021. The mountainous eight-day stage race covered 937.1 kilometres (582.3 mi) and over 15,428 metres (50,617 ft) of elevation, with 31 categorized climbs and four summit finishes. Like in previous editions, the Rwandan capital, Kigali, featured heavily in the race, being a start and/or finish location on all but one of the eight stages. While the Mur de Kigali time trial, which had featured as stage 7 of the past two editions, was not a part of the route, the cobbled hill was still climbed four times during the race. Instead, the race began with a short time trial for the first time since 2017.

Stage characteristics and winners
Stage	Date	Course	Distance	Type	Stage winner
1	20 February	Kigali (Kigali Arena)	4.0 km (2.5 mi)	Individual time trial	Alexandre Geniez (FRA)
2	21 February	Kigali (Amahoro Stadium) to Rwamagana	148.3 km (92.1 mi)	Hilly stage	Sandy Dujardin (FRA)
3	22 February	Kigali (MIC Building) to Rubavu	155.9 km (96.9 mi)	Mountain stage	Jhonatan Restrepo (COL)
4	23 February	Kigali (Kimironko) to Gicumbi	124.3 km (77.2 mi)	Mountain stage	Kent Main (RSA)
5	24 February	Muhanga to Musanze	124.7 km (77.5 mi)	Mountain stage	Alexandre Geniez (FRA)
6	25 February	Musanze to Kigali (Kigali Convention Centre)	152.0 km (94.4 mi)	Mountain stage	Anatoliy Budyak (UKR)
7	26 February	Kigali (Nyamirambo) to Kigali (Mont Kigali)	152.6 km (94.8 mi)	Mountain stage	Alan Boileau (FRA)
8	27 February	Kigali (Canal Olympia) to Kigali (Canal Olympia)	75.3 km (46.8 mi)	Mountain stage	Moise Mugisha (RWA)
Total			937.1 km (582.3 mi)		

== Stages ==
=== Stage 1 ===
20 February 2022 — Kigali (Kigali Arena), 4.0 km (2.5 mi) (ITT)

Stage 1 Result (1–10)
Rank	Rider	Team	Time
1	Alexandre Geniez (FRA)	Team TotalEnergies	4' 41"
2	Jhonatan Restrepo (COL)	Drone Hopper–Androni Giocattoli	+ 6"
3	Sandy Dujardin (FRA)	Team TotalEnergies	+ 7"
4	André Drege (NOR)	Team Coop	+ 9"
5	Axel Laurance (FRA)	B&B Hotels–KTM	+ 9"
6	Leo Hayter (GBR)	Great Britain	+ 10"
7	Alastair Mackellar (AUS)	Israel–Premier Tech	+ 12"
8	Omer Goldstein (ISR)	Israel–Premier Tech	+ 14"
9	Robert Donaldson (GBR)	Great Britain	+ 15"
10	Andreas Stokbro (DEN)	Team Coop	+ 15"

General classification after Stage 1 (1–10)
Rank	Rider	Team	Time
1	Alexandre Geniez (FRA)	Team TotalEnergies	4' 41"
2	Jhonatan Restrepo (COL)	Drone Hopper–Androni Giocattoli	+ 6"
3	Sandy Dujardin (FRA)	Team TotalEnergies	+ 7"
4	André Drege (NOR)	Team Coop	+ 9"
5	Axel Laurance (FRA)	B&B Hotels–KTM	+ 9"
6	Leo Hayter (GBR)	Great Britain	+ 10"
7	Alastair Mackellar (AUS)	Israel–Premier Tech	+ 12"
8	Omer Goldstein (ISR)	Israel–Premier Tech	+ 14"
9	Robert Donaldson (GBR)	Great Britain	+ 15"
10	Andreas Stokbro (DEN)	Team Coop	+ 15"

=== Stage 2 ===
21 February 2022 — Kigali (Amahoro Stadium) to Rwamagana, 148.3 km (92.1 mi)

Stage 2 Result (1–10)
Rank	Rider	Team	Time
1	Sandy Dujardin (FRA)	Team TotalEnergies	3h 28' 25"
2	Axel Laurance (FRA)	B&B Hotels–KTM	+ 0"
3	Jhonatan Restrepo (COL)	Drone Hopper–Androni Giocattoli	+ 0"
4	Henok Mulubrhan (ERI)	Bike Aid	+ 0"
5	Renus Byiza Uhiriwe (RWA)	Rwanda	+ 0"
6	Andreas Stokbro (DEN)	Team Coop	+ 0"
7	Louis Bendixen (DEN)	Team Coop	+ 0"
8	Robert Donaldson (GBR)	Great Britain	+ 0"
9	Scott McGill (USA)	Wildlife Generation Pro Cycling	+ 0"
10	Mohd Shahrul Mat Amin (MAS)	Terengganu Polygon Cycling Team	+ 0"

General classification after Stage 2 (1–10)
Rank	Rider	Team	Time
1	Alexandre Geniez (FRA)	Team TotalEnergies	3h 33' 06"
2	Jhonatan Restrepo (COL)	Drone Hopper–Androni Giocattoli	+ 6"
3	Sandy Dujardin (FRA)	Team TotalEnergies	+ 7"
4	André Drege (NOR)	Team Coop	+ 9"
5	Axel Laurance (FRA)	B&B Hotels–KTM	+ 9"
6	Leo Hayter (GBR)	Great Britain	+ 10"
7	Alastair Mackellar (AUS)	Israel–Premier Tech	+ 12"
8	Omer Goldstein (ISR)	Israel–Premier Tech	+ 14"
9	Robert Donaldson (GBR)	Great Britain	+ 15"
10	Andreas Stokbro (DEN)	Team Coop	+ 15"

=== Stage 3 ===
22 February 2022 — Kigali (MIC Building) to Rubavu, 155.9 km (96.9 mi)

Stage 3 Result (1–10)
Rank	Rider	Team	Time
1	Jhonatan Restrepo (COL)	Drone Hopper–Androni Giocattoli	3h 54' 10"
2	Axel Laurance (FRA)	B&B Hotels–KTM	+ 0"
3	Ángel Madrazo (ESP)	Burgos BH	+ 0"
4	Natnael Tesfatsion (ERI)	Drone Hopper–Androni Giocattoli	+ 0"
5	Jesse Ewart (IRL)	Bike Aid	+ 0"
6	Henok Mulubrhan (ERI)	Bike Aid	+ 0"
7	Anatoliy Budyak (UKR)	Terengganu Polygon Cycling Team	+ 0"
8	Michiel Stockman (BEL)	Saris Rouvy Sauerland Team	+ 1' 17"
9	Jesús Ezquerra (ESP)	Burgos BH	+ 1' 24"
9	Scott McGill (USA)	Wildlife Generation Pro Cycling	+ 1' 31"

General classification after Stage 3 (1–10)
Rank	Rider	Team	Time
1	Jhonatan Restrepo (COL)	Drone Hopper–Androni Giocattoli	7h 27' 22"
2	Axel Laurance (FRA)	B&B Hotels–KTM	+ 3"
3	Ángel Madrazo (ESP)	Burgos BH	+ 13"
4	Natnael Tesfatsion (ERI)	Drone Hopper–Androni Giocattoli	+ 13"
5	Anatoliy Budyak (UKR)	Terengganu Polygon Cycling Team	+ 20"
6	Henok Mulubrhan (ERI)	Bike Aid	+ 20"
7	Jesse Ewart (IRL)	Bike Aid	+ 26"
8	Sandy Dujardin (FRA)	Team TotalEnergies	+ 1' 32"
9	Jesús Ezquerra (ESP)	Burgos BH	+ 1' 34"
10	André Drege (NOR)	Team Coop	+ 1' 34"

=== Stage 4 ===
23 February 2022 — Kigali (Kimironko) to Gicumbi, 124.3 km (77.2 mi)

Stage 4 Result (1–10)
Rank	Rider	Team	Time
1	Kent Main (RSA)	ProTouch	3h 17' 40"
2	Anatoliy Budyak (UKR)	Terengganu Polygon Cycling Team	+ 2"
3	Alan Boileau (FRA)	B&B Hotels–KTM	+ 3"
4	Metkel Eyob (ERI)	Terengganu Polygon Cycling Team	+ 3"
5	Eric Muhoza (RWA)	Rwanda	+ 3"
6	Henok Mulubrhan (ERI)	Bike Aid	+ 3"
7	Lennert Teugels (BEL)	Tarteletto–Isorex	+ 3"
8	Natnael Tesfatsion (ERI)	Drone Hopper–Androni Giocattoli	+ 3"
9	Leo Hayter (GBR)	Great Britain	+ 3"
10	Andreas Stokbro (DEN)	Team Coop	+ 3"

General classification after Stage 4 (1–10)
Rank	Rider	Team	Time
1	Axel Laurance (FRA)	B&B Hotels–KTM	10h 45' 08"
2	Ángel Madrazo (ESP)	Burgos BH	+ 10"
3	Natnael Tesfatsion (ERI)	Drone Hopper–Androni Giocattoli	+ 10"
4	Anatoliy Budyak (UKR)	Terengganu Polygon Cycling Team	+ 16"
5	Henok Mulubrhan (ERI)	Bike Aid	+ 17"
6	Jesse Ewart (IRL)	Bike Aid	+ 23"
7	Sandy Dujardin (FRA)	Team TotalEnergies	+ 1' 29"
8	Leo Hayter (GBR)	Great Britain	+ 1' 32"
9	Alastair Mackellar (AUS)	Israel–Premier Tech	+ 1' 34"
10	Kent Main (RSA)	ProTouch	+ 1' 36"

=== Stage 5 ===
24 February 2022 — Muhanga to Musanze, 124.7 km (77.5 mi)

Stage 5 Result (1–10)
Rank	Rider	Team	Time
1	Alexandre Geniez (FRA)	Team TotalEnergies	3h 12' 14"
2	Pierre Rolland (FRA)	B&B Hotels–KTM	+ 3"
3	Eric Manizabayo (RWA)	Benediction Ignite	+ 19"
4	Henok Mulubrhan (ERI)	Bike Aid	+ 20"
5	Ángel Madrazo (ESP)	Burgos BH	+ 20"
6	Gianni Marchand (BEL)	Tarteletto–Isorex	+ 20"
7	Leo Hayter (GBR)	Great Britain	+ 20"
8	Natnael Tesfatsion (ERI)	Drone Hopper–Androni Giocattoli	+ 20"
9	Anatoliy Budyak (UKR)	Terengganu Polygon Cycling Team	+ 20"
10	Jesse Ewart (IRL)	Bike Aid	+ 20"

General classification after Stage 5 (1–10)
Rank	Rider	Team	Time
1	Ángel Madrazo (ESP)	Burgos BH	13h 57' 52"
2	Natnael Tesfatsion (ERI)	Drone Hopper–Androni Giocattoli	+ 0"
3	Anatoliy Budyak (UKR)	Terengganu Polygon Cycling Team	+ 6"
4	Henok Mulubrhan (ERI)	Bike Aid	+ 7"
5	Jesse Ewart (IRL)	Bike Aid	+ 13"
6	Leo Hayter (GBR)	Great Britain	+ 1' 22"
7	Kent Main (RSA)	ProTouch	+ 1' 26"
8	Eric Muhoza (RWA)	Rwanda	+ 1' 36"
9	Gianni Marchand (BEL)	Tarteletto–Isorex	+ 1' 36"
10	Juan Diego Alba (COL)	Drone Hopper–Androni Giocattoli	+ 1' 50"

=== Stage 6 ===
25 February 2022 — Musanze to Kigali (Kigali Convention Centre), 152.0 km (94.4 mi)

Stage 6 Result (1–10)
Rank	Rider	Team	Time
1	Anatoliy Budyak (UKR)	Terengganu Polygon Cycling Team	3h 35' 21"
2	Natnael Tesfatsion (ERI)	Drone Hopper–Androni Giocattoli	+ 0"
3	Eric Manizabayo (RWA)	Benediction Ignite	+ 5"
4	Jhonatan Restrepo (COL)	Drone Hopper–Androni Giocattoli	+ 7"
5	Henok Mulubrhan (ERI)	Bike Aid	+ 9"
6	Alan Boileau (FRA)	B&B Hotels–KTM	+ 16"
7	Sandy Dujardin (FRA)	Team TotalEnergies	+ 16"
8	Kent Main (RSA)	ProTouch	+ 16"
9	Jesse Ewart (IRL)	Bike Aid	+ 16"
10	Ángel Madrazo (ESP)	Burgos BH	+ 16"

General classification after Stage 6 (1–10)
Rank	Rider	Team	Time
1	Natnael Tesfatsion (ERI)	Drone Hopper–Androni Giocattoli	17h 33' 13"
2	Anatoliy Budyak (UKR)	Terengganu Polygon Cycling Team	+ 6"
3	Henok Mulubrhan (ERI)	Bike Aid	+ 16"
4	Ángel Madrazo (ESP)	Burgos BH	+ 16"
5	Jesse Ewart (IRL)	Bike Aid	+ 29"
6	Kent Main (RSA)	ProTouch	+ 1' 42"
7	Leo Hayter (GBR)	Great Britain	+ 1' 54"
8	Metkel Eyob (ERI)	Terengganu Polygon Cycling Team	+ 2' 11"
9	Juan Diego Alba (COL)	Drone Hopper–Androni Giocattoli	+ 2' 12"
10	Eric Manizabayo (RWA)	Benediction Ignite	+ 2' 15"

=== Stage 7 ===
26 February 2022 — Kigali (Nyamirambo) to Kigali (Mont Kigali), 152.6 km (94.8 mi)

Stage 7 Result (1–10)
Rank	Rider	Team	Time
1	Alan Boileau (FRA)	B&B Hotels–KTM	3h 41' 20"
2	Omer Goldstein (ISR)	Israel–Premier Tech	+ 3"
3	Gianni Marchand (BEL)	Tarteletto–Isorex	+ 11"
4	Paul Ourselin (FRA)	Team TotalEnergies	+ 50"
5	Natnael Tesfatsion (ERI)	Drone Hopper–Androni Giocattoli	+ 52"
6	Kent Main (RSA)	ProTouch	+ 1' 01"
7	Juan Diego Alba (COL)	Drone Hopper–Androni Giocattoli	+ 1' 05"
8	Eric Manizabayo (RWA)	Benediction Ignite	+ 1' 12"
9	Jesse Ewart (IRL)	Bike Aid	+ 1' 12"
10	Anatoliy Budyak (UKR)	Terengganu Polygon Cycling Team	+ 1' 12"

General classification after Stage 7 (1–10)
Rank	Rider	Team	Time
1	Natnael Tesfatsion (ERI)	Drone Hopper–Androni Giocattoli	21h 15' 25"
2	Anatoliy Budyak (UKR)	Terengganu Polygon Cycling Team	+ 26"
3	Jesse Ewart (IRL)	Bike Aid	+ 49"
4	Ángel Madrazo (ESP)	Burgos BH	+ 58"
5	Henok Mulubrhan (ERI)	Bike Aid	+ 1' 21"
6	Kent Main (RSA)	ProTouch	+ 1' 51"
7	Gianni Marchand (BEL)	Tarteletto–Isorex	+ 2' 02"
8	Juan Diego Alba (COL)	Drone Hopper–Androni Giocattoli	+ 2' 25"
9	Leo Hayter (GBR)	Great Britain	+ 2' 30"
10	Eric Manizabayo (RWA)	Benediction Ignite	+ 2' 35"

=== Stage 8 ===
27 February 2022 — Kigali (Canal Olympia) to Kigali (Canal Olympia), 75.3 km (46.8 mi)

Stage 8 Result (1–10)
Rank	Rider	Team	Time
1	Moise Mugisha (RWA)	ProTouch	2h 08' 16"
2	Sandy Dujardin (FRA)	Team TotalEnergies	+ 0"
3	Alexandre Geniez (FRA)	Team TotalEnergies	+ 0"
4	Lennert Teugels (BEL)	Tarteletto–Isorex	+ 1' 42"
5	Henok Mulubrhan (ERI)	Bike Aid	+ 1' 49"
6	Juan Diego Alba (COL)	Drone Hopper–Androni Giocattoli	+ 1' 50"
7	Ángel Madrazo (ESP)	Burgos BH	+ 1' 52"
8	Jesse Ewart (IRL)	Bike Aid	+ 1' 52"
9	Anatoliy Budyak (UKR)	Terengganu Polygon Cycling Team	+ 1' 53"
10	Natnael Tesfatsion (ERI)	Drone Hopper–Androni Giocattoli	+ 1' 53"

General classification after Stage 8 (1–10)
Rank	Rider	Team	Time
1	Natnael Tesfatsion (ERI)	Drone Hopper–Androni Giocattoli	23h 25' 34"
2	Anatoliy Budyak (UKR)	Terengganu Polygon Cycling Team	+ 26"
3	Jesse Ewart (IRL)	Bike Aid	+ 48"
4	Ángel Madrazo (ESP)	Burgos BH	+ 57"
5	Henok Mulubrhan (ERI)	Bike Aid	+ 1' 17"
6	Gianni Marchand (BEL)	Tarteletto–Isorex	+ 2' 13"
7	Kent Main (RSA)	ProTouch	+ 2' 21"
8	Juan Diego Alba (COL)	Drone Hopper–Androni Giocattoli	+ 2' 22"
9	Eric Manizabayo (RWA)	Benediction Ignite	+ 2' 49"
10	Leo Hayter (GBR)	Great Britain	+ 3' 10"

== Classification leadership table ==
Classification leadership by stage
Stage	Winner (Note: The jersey worn by the winner of the most recent stage is known as the red-gold-and-white jersey.)	General classification	Mountains classification (Note: The mountains classification leader's jersey is known as the orange-and-white jersey.)	Sprints classification (Note: The sprints classification leader's jersey is known as the dark blue jersey.)	Young rider classification (Note: The young rider classification leader's jersey is known as the blue-sky-and-yellow jersey.)	Rwandan rider classification	African rider classification (Note: The jerseys for the African rider classification, the team classification, and the combativity award are only awarded after each stage; they are not worn during the race.) (Note: The African rider classification leader's jersey is known as the green-and-white jersey.)	Team classification (Note: The team classification leader's jersey is known as the white-and-blue-sky jersey.)	Combativity award (Note: The team classification leader's jersey is known as the orange-green-and-white jersey.)
1	Alexandre Geniez	Alexandre Geniez	Not awarded	Not awarded	André Drege	Renus Byiza Uhiriwe	Kent Main	Team TotalEnergies	Axel Laurance
2	Sandy Dujardin	Alexandre Geniez	El Houcaine Sabbahi	El Houcaine Sabbahi	André Drege	Renus Byiza Uhiriwe	Kent Main	Team TotalEnergies	Leo Hayter
3	Jhonatan Restrepo	Jhonatan Restrepo	Axel Laurance	El Houcaine Sabbahi	Axel Laurance	Renus Byiza Uhiriwe	Natnael Tesfatsion	Drone Hopper–Androni Giocattoli	Axel Laurance
4	Kent Main	Axel Laurance	Samuel Mugisha	Sandy Dujardin	Axel Laurance	Eric Muhoza	Natnael Tesfatsion	Drone Hopper–Androni Giocattoli	Samuel Niyonkuru
5	Alexandre Geniez	Ángel Madrazo	Jean Bosco Nsengimana	Alexandre Geniez	Natnael Tesfatsion	Eric Muhoza	Natnael Tesfatsion	Drone Hopper–Androni Giocattoli	Pierre Rolland
6	Anatoliy Budyak	Natnael Tesfatsion	Jean Bosco Nsengimana	Pierre Rolland	Natnael Tesfatsion	Eric Manizabayo	Natnael Tesfatsion	Drone Hopper–Androni Giocattoli	Moise Mugisha
7	Alan Boileau	Natnael Tesfatsion	Jean Bosco Nsengimana	Pierre Rolland	Natnael Tesfatsion	Eric Manizabayo	Natnael Tesfatsion	Bike Aid	Omer Goldstein
8	Moise Mugisha	Natnael Tesfatsion	Moise Mugisha	Sandy Dujardin	Natnael Tesfatsion	Eric Manizabayo	Natnael Tesfatsion	Bike Aid	Omer Goldstein
Final		Natnael Tesfatsion	Moise Mugisha	Sandy Dujardin	Natnael Tesfatsion	Eric Manizabayo	Natnael Tesfatsion	Bike Aid	Omer Goldstein

- On stage 2, as per race regulations, Jhonatan Restrepo and Sandy Dujardin, who were the next two best-placed riders in the general classification not already leading a classification after stage 1, wore the orange-and-white and the dark blue jerseys, respectively. However, neither rider was deemed to be officially leading those respective classifications, as no points had been awarded on stage 1 for either classification.
- On stage 2, Axel Laurance, who finished fifth on stage 1, wore the red-gold-and-white jersey, as the best-placed rider not already leading a classification or wearing another classification jersey.
- On stage 3, Abram Stockman, who was second in the sprints classification, wore the dark blue jersey, because first-placed El Houcaine Sabbahi wore the orange-and-white jersey as the leader of the mountains jersey.
- On stages 4 and 5, Natnael Tesfatsion, who was second in the young rider classification, wore the blue-sky-and-yellow jersey, because first-placed Axel Laurance wore the orange-and-white jersey as the leader of the mountains classification.
- On stage 4, Ángel Madrazo, who finished third on stage 3, wore the red-gold-and-white jersey, because stage winner Jhonatan Restrepo wore the yellow jersey as the leader of the general classification, and second-placed finisher Axel Laurance wore the orange-and-white jersey as the leader of the mountains classification.
- On stage 6, Pierre Rolland, who finished second on stage 5, wore the red-gold-and-white jersey, because stage winner Alexandre Geniez wore the dark blue jersey as the leader of the sprints classification.
- On stages 7 and 8, Henok Mulubrhan, who was second in the young rider classification, wore the blue-sky-and-yellow jersey, because first-placed Natnael Tesfatsion wore the yellow jersey as the leader of the general classification.

== Final classification standings ==
Legend
Denotes the winner of the general classification	Denotes the winner of the African rider classification
Denotes the winner of the mountains classification	Denotes the winner of the Rwandan rider classification
Denotes the winner of the sprints classification	Denotes the winner of the team classification
Denotes the winner of the young rider classification	Denotes the winner of the combativity award

=== General classification ===
Final general classification (1–10)
Rank	Rider	Team	Time
1	Natnael Tesfatsion (ERI)	Drone Hopper–Androni Giocattoli	23h 25' 34"
2	Anatoliy Budyak (UKR)	Terengganu Polygon Cycling Team	+ 26"
3	Jesse Ewart (IRL)	Bike Aid	+ 48"
4	Ángel Madrazo (ESP)	Burgos BH	+ 57"
5	Henok Mulubrhan (ERI)	Bike Aid	+ 1' 17"
6	Gianni Marchand (BEL)	Tarteletto–Isorex	+ 2' 13"
7	Kent Main (RSA)	ProTouch	+ 2' 21"
8	Juan Diego Alba (COL)	Drone Hopper–Androni Giocattoli	+ 2' 22"
9	Eric Manizabayo (RWA)	Benediction Ignite	+ 2' 49"
10	Leo Hayter (GBR)	Great Britain	+ 3' 10"

=== Mountains classification ===
Final mountains classification (1–10)
Rank	Rider	Team	Points
1	Moise Mugisha (RWA)	ProTouch	65
2	Jean Bosco Nsengimana (RWA)	Benediction Ignite	61
3	Sandy Dujardin (FRA)	Team TotalEnergies	50
4	Alexandre Geniez (FRA)	Team TotalEnergies	37
5	Omer Goldstein (ISR)	Israel–Premier Tech	34
6	Mario Aparicio (ESP)	Burgos BH	25
7	Ángel Madrazo (ESP)	Burgos BH	24
8	Pierre Rolland (FRA)	B&B Hotels–KTM	24
9	Alan Boileau (FRA)	B&B Hotels–KTM	19
10	Henok Mulubrhan (ERI)	Bike Aid	19

=== Sprints classification ===
Final sprints classification (1–10)
Rank	Rider	Team	Points
1	Sandy Dujardin (FRA)	Team TotalEnergies	20
2	Pierre Rolland (FRA)	B&B Hotels–KTM	16
3	Alexandre Geniez (FRA)	Team TotalEnergies	10
4	Moise Mugisha (RWA)	ProTouch	6
5	Jesse Ewart (IRL)	Bike Aid	5
6	Achraf Ed-Doghmy (MAR)	Morocco	4
7	Paul Ourselin (FRA)	Team TotalEnergies	4
8	Natnael Tesfatsion (ERI)	Drone Hopper–Androni Giocattoli	2
9	Metkel Eyob (ERI)	Terengganu Polygon Cycling Team	2
10	Nasr Eddine Maatougui (MAR)	Morocco	2

=== Young rider classification ===
Final young rider classification (1–10)
Rank	Rider	Team	Time
1	Natnael Tesfatsion (ERI)	Drone Hopper–Androni Giocattoli	23h 25' 34"
2	Henok Mulubrhan (ERI)	Bike Aid	+ 1' 17"
3	Leo Hayter (GBR)	Great Britain	+ 3' 10"
4	Eric Muhoza (RWA)	Rwanda	+ 5' 52"
5	Alastair Mackellar (AUS)	Israel–Premier Tech	+ 27' 01"
6	Samuel Niyonkuru (RWA)	Rwanda	+ 27' 03"
7	Wesley Mol (NED)	Bike Aid	+ 27' 44"
8	Emmanuel Iradukunda (RWA)	Rwanda	+ 28' 39"
9	Andreas Goeman (BEL)	Tarteletto–Isorex	+ 28' 50"
10	Mario Aparicio (ESP)	Burgos BH	+ 30' 54"

=== Rwandan rider classification ===
Final Rwandan rider classification (1–10)
Rank	Rider	Team	Time
1	Eric Manizabayo (RWA)	Benediction Ignite	23h 28' 23"
2	Eric Muhoza (RWA)	Rwanda	+ 3' 03"
3	Mike Uwiduyahe (RWA)	Benediction Ignite	+ 10' 03"
4	Moise Mugisha (RWA)	ProTouch	+ 14' 46"
5	Jean Bosco Nsengimana (RWA)	Benediction Ignite	+ 23' 51"
6	Samuel Niyonkuru (RWA)	Rwanda	+ 24' 14"
7	Emmanuel Iradukunda (RWA)	Rwanda	+ 25' 50"
8	Patrick Byukusenge (RWA)	Benediction Ignite	+ 53' 10"
9	Seth Hakizimana (RWA)	Rwanda	+ 58' 33"
10	Janvier Rugamba (RWA)	Benediction Ignite	+ 1h 03' 55"

=== African rider classification ===
Final African rider classification (1–10)
Rank	Rider	Team	Time
1	Natnael Tesfatsion (ERI)	Drone Hopper–Androni Giocattoli	23h 25' 34"
2	Henok Mulubrhan (ERI)	Bike Aid	+ 1' 17"
3	Kent Main (RSA)	ProTouch	+ 2' 21"
4	Eric Manizabayo (RWA)	Benediction Ignite	+ 2' 49"
5	Metkel Eyob (ERI)	Terengganu Polygon Cycling Team	+ 4' 30"
6	Eric Muhoza (RWA)	Rwanda	+ 5' 52"
7	Mike Uwiduyahe (RWA)	Benediction Ignite	+ 12' 52"
8	Charles Kagimu (UGA)	ProTouch	+ 17' 33"
9	Moise Mugisha (RWA)	ProTouch	+ 17' 35"
10	Jean Bosco Nsengimana (RWA)	Benediction Ignite	+ 26' 40"

=== Team classification ===
Final team classification (1–10)
Rank	Team	Time
1	Bike Aid	70h 27' 04"
2	Drone Hopper–Androni Giocattoli	+ 8' 03"
3	ProTouch	+ 10' 30"
4	Tarteletto–Isorex	+ 19' 04"
5	Team TotalEnergies	+ 21' 57"
6	Benediction Ignite	+ 28' 51"
7	Rwanda	+ 41' 08"
8	Terengganu Polygon Cycling Team	+ 1h 02' 18"
9	Israel–Premier Tech	+ 1h 04' 37"
10	Wildlife Generation Pro Cycling	+ 1h 12' 43"
