= Aimable =

Aimable is a masculine given name which may refer to:

- Aimable Bayingana (born 1970), Rwandan sports executive
- Aimable Denhez (1914–1977), French racing cyclist
- Aimable Duperouzel (1831–1901), French-born convict
- Aimable Robert Jonckheere (1920–2005), British psychologist and statistician
- Aimable Manirakiza, Burundian human rights activist
- Aimable Nsabimana (born 1997), Rwandan footballer
- Aimable Pélissier (1794–1864), Marshal of France
- Steven Aimable (born 1999), Senegalese swimmer

== See also ==
- Aimable Joséphine (1809 ship)
