= 2013 Vuelta a España, Stage 12 to Stage 21 =

Cycling race stages

The 2013 Vuelta a España began on 23 August, and stage 12 occurs on 5 September. The second half of the race takes in most of the mountain stages, with 5 occurring in the last 9 days. This part of the race is where the winner should be confirmed, with large time gaps expected to appear during the mountain stages.

Legend (Note: Jerseys appearing in the table on the left of the page indicate those worn by the cyclist during the particular stage, while those appearing in the table on the right of the page indicate those awarded to the cyclist after the stage.)
| A red jersey | Denotes the leader of the General classification | A bluedotted jersey | Denotes the leader of the Mountains classification |
| A green jersey | Denotes the leader of the Points classification | A white jersey | Denotes the leader of the Combination classification |
| A jersey with a white rider number on a red background | Denotes the rider designated as the day's most combative | s.t. | A rider that crossed the finish line in the same group as the one receiving the time above him and was therefore credited with the same finishing time. |

== Stage 12 ==
5 September 2013 — Maella to Tarragona, 164.2 km (102.0 mi)

Stage 12 result

| | Rider | Team | Time |
|---|---|---|---|
| 1 | Philippe Gilbert (BEL) | BMC Racing Team | 4h 03' 44" |
| 2 | Edvald Boasson Hagen (NOR) | Team Sky | s.t. |
| 3 | Maximiliano Richeze (ARG) | Lampre–Merida | s.t. |
| 4 | Luca Paolini (ITA) | Team Katusha | s.t. |
| 5 | Gianni Meersman (BEL) | Omega Pharma–Quick-Step | s.t. |
| 6 | Francesco Lasca (ITA) | Caja Rural–Seguros RGA | s.t. |
| 7 | Steve Chainel (FRA) | Ag2r–La Mondiale | s.t. |
| 8 | Reinardt Janse van Rensburg (RSA) | Argos–Shimano | s.t. |
| 9 | Anthony Roux (FRA) | FDJ.fr | s.t. |
| 10 | Zak Dempster (AUS) | NetApp–Endura | s.t. |

General classification after stage 12

| | Rider | Team | Time |
|---|---|---|---|
| 1 | Vincenzo Nibali (ITA) | Astana | 45h 26' 06" |
| 2 | Nicolas Roche (IRL) | Saxo–Tinkoff | + 31" |
| 3 | Alejandro Valverde (ESP) | Movistar Team | + 46" |
| 4 | Chris Horner (USA) | RadioShack–Leopard | + 46" |
| 5 | Joaquim Rodríguez (ESP) | Team Katusha | + 2' 33" |
| 6 | Domenico Pozzovivo (ITA) | Ag2r–La Mondiale | + 2' 44" |
| 7 | Ivan Basso (ITA) | Cannondale | + 2' 52" |
| 8 | Thibaut Pinot (FRA) | FDJ.fr | + 3' 35" |
| 9 | Rafał Majka (POL) | Saxo–Tinkoff | + 3' 46" |
| 10 | Daniel Moreno (ESP) | Team Katusha | + 3' 56" |

== Stage 13 ==
6 September 2013 — Valls to Castelldefels, 169 km (105.0 mi)

Stage 13 result

| | Rider | Team | Time |
|---|---|---|---|
| 1 | Warren Barguil (FRA) | Argos–Shimano | 4h 00' 13" |
| 2 | Rinaldo Nocentini (ITA) | Ag2r–La Mondiale | + 7" |
| 3 | Bauke Mollema (NED) | Belkin Pro Cycling | + 7" |
| 4 | Ivan Santaromita (ITA) | BMC Racing Team | + 7" |
| 5 | Xabier Zandio (ESP) | Team Sky | + 7" |
| 6 | Amets Txurruka (ESP) | Caja Rural–Seguros RGA | + 7" |
| 7 | Michele Scarponi (ITA) | Lampre–Merida | + 7" |
| 8 | Egoi Martínez (ESP) | Euskaltel–Euskadi | + 7" |
| 9 | Jérôme Coppel (FRA) | Cofidis | + 24" |
| 10 | Beñat Intxausti (ESP) | Movistar Team | + 2' 34" |

General classification after stage 13

| | Rider | Team | Time |
|---|---|---|---|
| 1 | Vincenzo Nibali (ITA) | Astana | 49h 29' 02" |
| 2 | Nicolas Roche (IRL) | Saxo–Tinkoff | + 31" |
| 3 | Alejandro Valverde (ESP) | Movistar Team | + 46" |
| 4 | Chris Horner (USA) | RadioShack–Leopard | + 46" |
| 5 | Joaquim Rodríguez (ESP) | Team Katusha | + 2' 33" |
| 6 | Domenico Pozzovivo (ITA) | Ag2r–La Mondiale | + 2' 44" |
| 7 | Ivan Basso (ITA) | Cannondale | + 2' 52" |
| 8 | Thibaut Pinot (FRA) | FDJ.fr | + 3' 35" |
| 9 | Rafał Majka (POL) | Saxo–Tinkoff | + 3' 46" |
| 10 | Daniel Moreno (ESP) | Team Katusha | + 3' 56" |

== Stage 14 ==
7 September 2013 — Bagà to Andorra–Collada de la Gallina (Andorra), 155.7 km (96.7 mi)

Stage 14 result

| | Rider | Team | Time |
|---|---|---|---|
| 1 | Daniele Ratto (ITA) | Cannondale | 4h 24' 00" |
| 2 | Vincenzo Nibali (ITA) | Astana | + 3' 53" |
| 3 | Chris Horner (USA) | RadioShack–Leopard | + 3' 55" |
| 4 | Joaquim Rodríguez (ESP) | Team Katusha | + 4' 11" |
| 5 | Samuel Sánchez (ESP) | Euskaltel–Euskadi | + 4' 19" |
| 6 | Alejandro Valverde (ESP) | Movistar Team | + 4' 43" |
| 7 | Thibaut Pinot (FRA) | FDJ.fr | + 4' 46" |
| 8 | Domenico Pozzovivo (ITA) | Ag2r–La Mondiale | + 4' 46" |
| 9 | Mikel Landa (ESP) | Euskaltel–Euskadi | + 5' 17" |
| 10 | Leopold König (CZE) | NetApp–Endura | + 5' 21" |

General classification after stage 14

| | Rider | Team | Time |
|---|---|---|---|
| 1 | Vincenzo Nibali (ITA) | Astana | 53h 56' 49" |
| 2 | Chris Horner (USA) | RadioShack–Leopard | + 50" |
| 3 | Alejandro Valverde (ESP) | Movistar Team | + 1' 42" |
| 4 | Joaquim Rodríguez (ESP) | Team Katusha | + 2' 57" |
| 5 | Domenico Pozzovivo (ITA) | Ag2r–La Mondiale | + 3' 43" |
| 6 | Nicolas Roche (IRL) | Saxo–Tinkoff | + 4' 06" |
| 7 | Thibaut Pinot (FRA) | FDJ.fr | + 4' 34" |
| 8 | Leopold König (CZE) | NetApp–Endura | + 5' 42" |
| 9 | Daniel Moreno (ESP) | Team Katusha | + 6' 28" |
| 10 | Tanel Kangert (EST) | Astana | + 6' 45" |

== Stage 15 ==
8 September 2013 — Andorra (Andorra) to Peyragudes (France), 224.9 km (139.7 mi)

Stage 15 result

| | Rider | Team | Time |
|---|---|---|---|
| 1 | Alexandre Geniez (FRA) | FDJ.fr | 6h 20' 12" |
| 2 | Michele Scarponi (ITA) | Lampre–Merida | + 3' 03" |
| 3 | Nicolas Roche (IRL) | Saxo–Tinkoff | + 3' 07" |
| 4 | Vincenzo Nibali (ITA) | Astana | + 3' 20" |
| 5 | Alejandro Valverde (ESP) | Movistar Team | + 3' 20" |
| 6 | Chris Horner (USA) | RadioShack–Leopard | + 3' 20" |
| 7 | Joaquim Rodríguez (ESP) | Team Katusha | + 3' 20" |
| 8 | Domenico Pozzovivo (ITA) | Ag2r–La Mondiale | + 3' 20" |
| 9 | José Herrada (ESP) | Movistar Team | + 3' 23" |
| 10 | David Arroyo (ESP) | Caja Rural–Seguros RGA | + 3' 23" |

General classification after stage 15

| | Rider | Team | Time |
|---|---|---|---|
| 1 | Vincenzo Nibali (ITA) | Astana | 60h 20' 21" |
| 2 | Chris Horner (USA) | RadioShack–Leopard | + 50" |
| 3 | Alejandro Valverde (ESP) | Movistar Team | + 1' 42" |
| 4 | Joaquim Rodríguez (ESP) | Team Katusha | + 2' 57" |
| 5 | Domenico Pozzovivo (ITA) | Ag2r–La Mondiale | + 3' 43" |
| 6 | Nicolas Roche (IRL) | Saxo–Tinkoff | + 3' 49" |
| 7 | Thibaut Pinot (FRA) | FDJ.fr | + 4' 59" |
| 8 | Leopold König (CZE) | NetApp–Endura | + 6' 18" |
| 9 | Samuel Sánchez (ESP) | Euskaltel–Euskadi | + 7' 46" |
| 10 | Tanel Kangert (EST) | Astana | + 9' 11" |

== Stage 16 ==
9 September 2013 — Graus to Sallent de Gállego–Aramón Formigal, 146.8 km (91.2 mi)

Stage 16 result

| | Rider | Team | Time |
|---|---|---|---|
| 1 | Warren Barguil (FRA) | Argos–Shimano | 3h 43' 31" |
| 2 | Rigoberto Urán (COL) | Team Sky | s.t. |
| 3 | Bartosz Huzarski (POL) | NetApp–Endura | + 3" |
| 4 | Dominik Nerz (GER) | BMC Racing Team | + 8" |
| 5 | José Herrada (ESP) | Movistar Team | + 20" |
| 6 | Mikaël Cherel (FRA) | Ag2r–La Mondiale | + 37" |
| 7 | Maciej Paterski (POL) | Cannondale | + 37" |
| 8 | André Cardoso (POR) | Caja Rural–Seguros RGA | + 40" |
| 9 | Amets Txurruka (ESP) | Caja Rural–Seguros RGA | + 42" |
| 10 | Chris Anker Sørensen (DEN) | Saxo–Tinkoff | + 45" |

General classification after stage 16

| | Rider | Team | Time |
|---|---|---|---|
| 1 | Vincenzo Nibali (ITA) | Astana | 64h 06' 01" |
| 2 | Chris Horner (USA) | RadioShack–Leopard | + 28" |
| 3 | Alejandro Valverde (ESP) | Movistar Team | + 1' 14" |
| 4 | Joaquim Rodríguez (ESP) | Team Katusha | + 2' 29" |
| 5 | Domenico Pozzovivo (ITA) | Ag2r–La Mondiale | + 3' 38" |
| 6 | Nicolas Roche (IRL) | Saxo–Tinkoff | + 3' 43" |
| 7 | Thibaut Pinot (FRA) | FDJ.fr | + 4' 37" |
| 8 | Leopold König (CZE) | NetApp–Endura | + 6' 17" |
| 9 | Samuel Sánchez (ESP) | Euskaltel–Euskadi | + 7' 33" |
| 10 | Tanel Kangert (EST) | Astana | + 9' 21" |

== Stage 17 ==
11 September 2013 — Calahorra to Burgos, 189 km (117.4 mi)

Stage 17 result

| | Rider | Team | Time |
|---|---|---|---|
| 1 | Bauke Mollema (NED) | Belkin Pro Cycling | 4h 44' 28" |
| 2 | Edvald Boasson Hagen (NOR) | Team Sky | s.t. |
| 3 | Maximiliano Richeze (ARG) | Lampre–Merida | s.t. |
| 4 | Tyler Farrar (USA) | Garmin–Sharp | s.t. |
| 5 | Fabian Cancellara (SUI) | RadioShack–Leopard | s.t. |
| 6 | Grega Bole (SLO) | Vacansoleil–DCM | s.t. |
| 7 | Luca Paolini (ITA) | Team Katusha | s.t. |
| 8 | Paul Voss (GER) | NetApp–Endura | s.t. |
| 9 | José Herrada (ESP) | Movistar Team | s.t. |
| 10 | Nicolas Roche (IRL) | Saxo–Tinkoff | s.t. |

General classification after stage 17

| | Rider | Team | Time |
|---|---|---|---|
| 1 | Vincenzo Nibali (ITA) | Astana | 68h 50' 29" |
| 2 | Chris Horner (USA) | RadioShack–Leopard | + 28" |
| 3 | Alejandro Valverde (ESP) | Movistar Team | + 1' 14" |
| 4 | Joaquim Rodríguez (ESP) | Team Katusha | + 2' 29" |
| 5 | Nicolas Roche (IRL) | Saxo–Tinkoff | + 3' 43" |
| 6 | Domenico Pozzovivo (ITA) | Ag2r–La Mondiale | + 5' 09" |
| 7 | Thibaut Pinot (FRA) | FDJ.fr | + 6' 08" |
| 8 | Leopold König (CZE) | NetApp–Endura | + 6' 17" |
| 9 | Samuel Sánchez (ESP) | Euskaltel–Euskadi | + 7' 33" |
| 10 | Tanel Kangert (EST) | Astana | + 10' 52" |

== Stage 18 ==
12 September 2013 — Burgos to Peña Cabarga, 186.5 km (115.9 mi)

Stage 18 result

| | Rider | Team | Time |
|---|---|---|---|
| 1 | Vasil Kiryienka (BLR) | Team Sky | 4h 46' 48" |
| 2 | Chris Anker Sørensen (DEN) | Saxo–Tinkoff | + 28" |
| 3 | Adam Hansen (AUS) | Lotto–Belisol | + 1' 18" |
| 4 | Martin Kohler (SUI) | BMC Racing Team | + 1' 34" |
| 5 | Egoi Martínez (ESP) | Euskaltel–Euskadi | + 1' 42" |
| 6 | Chris Horner (USA) | RadioShack–Leopard | + 1' 53" |
| 7 | Amets Txurruka (ESP) | Caja Rural–Seguros RGA | + 2' 02" |
| 8 | Joaquim Rodríguez (ESP) | Team Katusha | + 2' 13" |
| 9 | Alejandro Valverde (ESP) | Movistar Team | + 2' 13" |
| 10 | Vincenzo Nibali (ITA) | Astana | + 2' 18" |

General classification after stage 18

| | Rider | Team | Time |
|---|---|---|---|
| 1 | Vincenzo Nibali (ITA) | Astana | 73h 39' 35" |
| 2 | Chris Horner (USA) | RadioShack–Leopard | + 3" |
| 3 | Alejandro Valverde (ESP) | Movistar Team | + 1' 09" |
| 4 | Joaquim Rodríguez (ESP) | Team Katusha | + 2' 24" |
| 5 | Nicolas Roche (IRL) | Saxo–Tinkoff | + 3' 43" |
| 6 | Domenico Pozzovivo (ITA) | Ag2r–La Mondiale | + 5' 44" |
| 7 | Thibaut Pinot (FRA) | FDJ.fr | + 6' 14" |
| 8 | Leopold König (CZE) | NetApp–Endura | + 6' 35" |
| 9 | Samuel Sánchez (ESP) | Euskaltel–Euskadi | + 7' 51" |
| 10 | Tanel Kangert (EST) | Astana | + 11' 10" |

== Stage 19 ==
13 September 2013 — San Vicente de la Barquera to Oviedo–Alto Naranco, 181 km (112.5 mi)

Stage 19 result

| | Rider | Team | Time |
|---|---|---|---|
| 1 | Joaquim Rodríguez (ESP) | Team Katusha | 4h 16' 13" |
| 2 | Diego Ulissi (ITA) | Lampre–Merida | + 11" |
| 3 | Daniel Moreno (ESP) | Team Katusha | + 11" |
| 4 | Samuel Sánchez (ESP) | Euskaltel–Euskadi | + 11" |
| 5 | Chris Horner (USA) | RadioShack–Leopard | + 14" |
| 6 | Alejandro Valverde (ESP) | Movistar Team | + 14" |
| 7 | Michele Scarponi (ITA) | Lampre–Merida | + 16" |
| 8 | Leopold König (CZE) | NetApp–Endura | + 20" |
| 9 | Vincenzo Nibali (ITA) | Astana | + 20" |
| 10 | Nicolas Roche (IRL) | Saxo–Tinkoff | + 23" |

General classification after stage 19

| | Rider | Team | Time |
|---|---|---|---|
| 1 | Chris Horner (USA) | RadioShack–Leopard | 77h 56' 05" |
| 2 | Vincenzo Nibali (ITA) | Astana | + 3" |
| 3 | Alejandro Valverde (ESP) | Movistar Team | + 1' 06" |
| 4 | Joaquim Rodríguez (ESP) | Team Katusha | + 1' 57" |
| 5 | Nicolas Roche (IRL) | Saxo–Tinkoff | + 3' 49" |
| 6 | Domenico Pozzovivo (ITA) | Ag2r–La Mondiale | + 6' 00" |
| 7 | Leopold König (CZE) | NetApp–Endura | + 6' 38" |
| 8 | Thibaut Pinot (FRA) | FDJ.fr | + 7' 02" |
| 9 | Samuel Sánchez (ESP) | Euskaltel–Euskadi | + 7' 45" |
| 10 | Daniel Moreno (ESP) | Team Katusha | + 11' 05" |

== Stage 20 ==
14 September 2013 — Avilés to Alto de L'Angliru, 142.2 km (88.4 mi)

Stage 20 result

| | Rider | Team | Time |
|---|---|---|---|
| 1 | Kenny Elissonde (FRA) | FDJ.fr | 3h 55' 36" |
| 2 | Chris Horner (USA) | RadioShack–Leopard | + 26" |
| 3 | Alejandro Valverde (ESP) | Movistar Team | + 54" |
| 4 | Vincenzo Nibali (ITA) | Astana | + 54" |
| 5 | André Cardoso (POR) | Caja Rural–Seguros RGA | + 54" |
| 6 | Dominik Nerz (GER) | BMC Racing Team | + 54" |
| 7 | José Mendes (POR) | NetApp–Endura | + 1' 15" |
| 8 | Joaquim Rodríguez (ESP) | Team Katusha | + 1' 45" |
| 9 | Serge Pauwels (BEL) | Omega Pharma–Quick-Step | + 1' 52" |
| 10 | Thibaut Pinot (FRA) | FDJ.fr | + 1' 59" |

General classification after stage 20

| | Rider | Team | Time |
|---|---|---|---|
| 1 | Chris Horner (USA) | RadioShack–Leopard | 81h 52' 01" |
| 2 | Vincenzo Nibali (ITA) | Astana | + 37" |
| 3 | Alejandro Valverde (ESP) | Movistar Team | + 1' 36" |
| 4 | Joaquim Rodríguez (ESP) | Team Katusha | + 3' 22" |
| 5 | Nicolas Roche (IRL) | Saxo–Tinkoff | + 7' 11" |
| 6 | Domenico Pozzovivo (ITA) | Ag2r–La Mondiale | + 8' 00" |
| 7 | Thibaut Pinot (FRA) | FDJ.fr | + 8' 41" |
| 8 | Samuel Sánchez (ESP) | Euskaltel–Euskadi | + 9' 51" |
| 9 | Leopold König (CZE) | NetApp–Endura | + 10' 11" |
| 10 | Daniel Moreno (ESP) | Team Katusha | + 13' 11" |

== Stage 21 ==
15 September 2013 — Leganés to Madrid, 109.6 km (68.1 mi)

Stage 21 result

| | Rider | Team | Time |
|---|---|---|---|
| 1 | Michael Matthews (AUS) | Orica–GreenEDGE | 2h 44' 00" |
| 2 | Tyler Farrar (USA) | Garmin–Sharp | s.t. |
| 3 | Nikias Arndt (GER) | Argos–Shimano | s.t. |
| 4 | Gianni Meersman (BEL) | Omega Pharma–Quick-Step | s.t. |
| 5 | Maximiliano Richeze (ARG) | Lampre–Merida | s.t. |
| 6 | Grega Bole (SLO) | Vacansoleil–DCM | s.t. |
| 7 | Adrien Petit (FRA) | Cofidis | s.t. |
| 8 | Reinardt Janse van Rensburg (RSA) | Argos–Shimano | s.t. |
| 9 | Francesco Lasca (ITA) | Caja Rural–Seguros RGA | s.t. |
| 10 | Robert Wagner (GER) | Belkin Pro Cycling | s.t. |

Final General Classification

| | Rider | Team | Time |
|---|---|---|---|
| 1 | Chris Horner (USA) | RadioShack–Leopard | 84h 36' 04" |
| 2 | Vincenzo Nibali (ITA) | Astana | + 37" |
| 3 | Alejandro Valverde (ESP) | Movistar Team | + 1' 36" |
| 4 | Joaquim Rodríguez (ESP) | Team Katusha | + 3' 22" |
| 5 | Nicolas Roche (IRL) | Saxo–Tinkoff | + 7' 11" |
| 6 | Domenico Pozzovivo (ITA) | Ag2r–La Mondiale | + 8' 00" |
| 7 | Thibaut Pinot (FRA) | FDJ.fr | + 8' 41" |
| 8 | Samuel Sánchez (ESP) | Euskaltel–Euskadi | + 9' 51" |
| 9 | Leopold König (CZE) | NetApp–Endura | + 10' 11" |
| 10 | Daniel Moreno (ESP) | Team Katusha | + 13' 11" |
