= Ndayishimiye =

Ndayishimiye is a surname. Notable people with the surname include:

- Évariste Ndayishimiye (b. 1968), current President of Burundi
- Jean-Luc Ndayishimiye (b. 1991), Rwandan footballer
- Mike Trésor Ndayishimiye (b. 1999), Belgian footballer
- Samson Ndayishimiye (b. 1980), Rwandan retired swimmer
- Youssouf Ndayishimiye (b. 1998), Burundian footballer
