= 2021 Maryland Cycling Classic =

American cycling race

2021 UCI America Tour 2021 UCI ProSeries

Race details
- Dates: September 5, 2021
- Stages: 1
- Distance: 110 mi (177.0 km)

The 2021 Maryland Cycling Classic (known as the Maryland Cycling Classic, presented by UnitedHealthcare for sponsorship reasons) was scheduled to be the inaugural edition of the Maryland Cycling Classic road cycling one day race, to be held on September 5, 2021. The category 1.Pro race is a part of the 2021 UCI America Tour and the 2021 UCI ProSeries calendars.

The inaugural edition was originally scheduled for September 6, 2020, but it was postponed to 2021 due to the COVID-19 pandemic. With the Tour of California, the only American UCI World Tour event, on indefinite hiatus, and the Tour of Utah, the only other American UCI ProSeries race, remaining cancelled due to the COVID-19 pandemic, the Maryland Cycling Classic would have been the highest level road cycling race in the United States in 2021.

However, on July 2, 2021, race organizers decided to postpone the race again, with the inaugural edition now expected to take place in 2022.

== Teams ==
On March 10, 2021, race organizers announced the first five teams that would have participated in the race; these included UCI WorldTeams Team BikeExchange and Trek–Segafredo, UCI ProTeam Rally Cycling, and UCI Continental teams Aevolo and Wildlife Generation Pro Cycling, with the latter four being American teams. On May 7, 2021, five more UCI Continental teams were announced: these were Amore & Vita, Team Medellín–EPM, and American teams Elevate–Webiplex Pro Cycling, Hagens Berman Axeon, and Team Illuminate.

As of the announcement of the cancellation of the race, two UCI WorldTeams, one UCI ProTeam, and seven UCI Continental teams made up the ten teams that would have participated in the race, with race organizers originally expecting to invite six to eight more teams.

UCI WorldTeams

- Team BikeExchange
- Trek–Segafredo

UCI ProTeams

- Rally Cycling

UCI Continental Teams

- Aevolo
- Amore & Vita
- Elevate–Webiplex Pro Cycling
- Hagens Berman Axeon
- Team Medellín–EPM
- Team Illuminate
- Wildlife Generation Pro Cycling
