= Jesse Ewart =

Australian-Irish bicycle racer (born 1994)

Personal information
- Full name: Jesse Ewart
- Born: 31 July 1994 (age 32) Newcastle, New South Wales, Australia
- Height: 1.83 m (6 ft 0 in)

Cycling career
- Sport: Cycling
- Discipline: Road
- Role: Rider
- Rider type: Climber

Amateur team
- 2015: GPM Stulz

Professional teams
- 2016–2017: 7 Eleven–Sava RBP
- 2018–2021: Team Sapura Cycling
- 2022: Bike Aid
- 2023–2024: Terengganu Polygon Cycling Team

Jesse Ewart (born 31 July 1994) is an Australian-born Irish cyclist, who last rides for UCI Continental team Terengganu Cycling Team.

In September 2024, Jesse was given a three-year ban by the Union Cycliste Internationale. He tested positive for EPO. As a result, all of his results in 2024 up to his provisional suspension in May 2024 were struck off the record by UCI.

== Major results ==
2016
4th Overall Tour de Filipinas
10th Overall Jelajah Malaysia

1st Young rider classification

2017
3rd Overall Tour de Molvccas
8th Overall Tour de Flores
2018
1st Overall Tour de Singkarak

1st Stage 3

2nd Overall Tour de Ijen

1st Stage 3

10th Overall Tour of Indonesia
2019
1st Overall Tour de Singkarak

1st Stages 1 & 2

3rd Overall Tour de Ijen
4th Overall Tour of Indonesia
7th Overall Tour of Iran (Azerbaijan)
2020
2nd Malaysian International Classic Race
4th Grand Prix Velo Alanya
6th Overall Herald Sun Tour
2021
5th Road race, Australian National Road Championships
2022
3rd Overall Tour du Rwanda
2024
~~1st Stage 1 Tour of Sharjah~~
~~1st Stage 4 Tour of Thailand~~
~~2nd The Bueng Si Fai International Road Race~~
