= Juan Diego Alba =

Colombian cyclist

Personal information
- Full name: Juan Diego Alba Bolívar
- Born: 11 September 1997 (age 29) Tuta, Boyacá, Colombia
- Height: 1.73 m (5 ft 8 in)
- Weight: 59 kg (130 lb)

Cycling career
- Sport: Cycling
- Current team: Best PC Ecuador
- Discipline: Road
- Role: Rider
- Rider type: CLimber

Amateur team
- 2017: Boyacá es Para Vivirla

Professional teams
- 2018–2019: Coldeportes–Zenú–Sello Rojo
- 2020–2021: Movistar Team
- 2022: Drone Hopper–Androni Giocattoli
- 2023–: Movistar–Best PC

Juan Diego Alba Bolívar (born 11 September 1997) is a Colombian cyclist, who currently rides for UCI Continental team Best PC Ecuador.

== Major results ==
2018
1st Stage 4 Vuelta a Antioquia
1st Stage 4 Vuelta a Boyacá
2019
3rd Overall Giro Ciclistico d'Italia

1st Stage 6

2022
8th Overall Tour du Rwanda
9th Overall Vuelta al Táchira
2023
1st Overall Vuelta a Costa Rica
3rd Overall Vuelta al Táchira
