= Samson Ndayishimiye =

Rwandan swimmer

Personal information
- Born: 12 April 1980 (age 46)

Sport
- Sport: Swimming

Samson Ndayishimiye (born 12 April 1980) is a retired Rwandan swimmer who specialized in sprint freestyle events. Ndayishimiye competed for Rwanda in the men's 50 m freestyle at the 2000 Summer Olympics in Sydney. He received a ticket from FINA, under a Universality program, without meeting an entry time. He challenged six other swimmers in heat one, including 16-year-olds Wael Ghassan of Qatar and Hassan Mubah of the Maldives. With one swimmer casting out of the race for a no false-start rule, Ndayishimiye rounded out the field to last place in a time of 38.76, the slowest of all time in the heats. Ndayishimiye failed to advance into the semifinals, as he placed seventy-fourth overall out of 80 swimmers in the prelims.

In 2022 Ndayishimiye became manager of Rwanda’s first female motorsport driver Queen Kalimpinya and in 2023 competed himself in two races. In November 2023 Ndayishimiye was elected president of the Rwanda Cycling Federation.
