= 2012 GP Miguel Induráin =

Race details
- Dates: 31 March 2012
- Stages: 1
- Distance: 179.3 km (111.4 mi)
- Winning time: 4h 54' 34"

Results
	Winner	Daniel Moreno (ESP)
	Second	Mikel Landa (ESP)
	Third	Ángel Madrazo (ESP)

The 2012 GP Miguel Induráin was the 59th edition of the GP Miguel Induráin cycle race and was held on 31 March 2012. The race started and finished in Estella. The race was won by Daniel Moreno.

== General classification ==
Final general classification

Rank	Rider	Time
1	Daniel Moreno (ESP)	4h 54' 34"
2	Mikel Landa (ESP)	+ 2"
3	Ángel Madrazo (ESP)	+ 7"
4	Rui Costa (POR)	+ 7"
5	Dominik Nerz (GER)	+ 9"
6	Sérgio Paulinho (POR)	+ 14"
7	Danail Petrov (BUL)	+ 17"
8	Damiano Caruso (ITA)	+ 23"
9	David Zabriskie (USA)	+ 23"
10	Eduard Vorganov (RUS)	+ 23"
