= Sandy Dujardin =

French bicycle racer

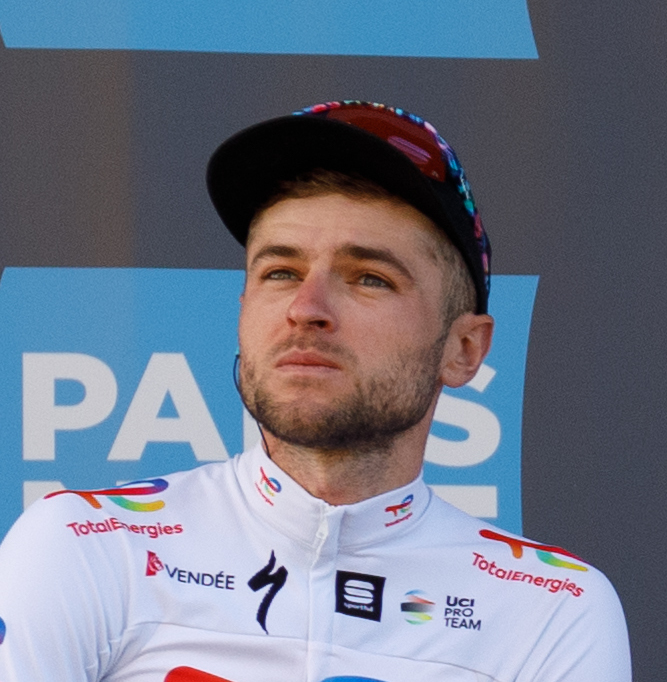
- Dujardin in 2023

Personal information
- Born: 29 May 1997 (age 29) Mont-Saint-Aignan, France
- Height: 1.78 m (5 ft 10 in)

Cycling career
- Sport: Cycling
- Current team: Team TotalEnergies
- Disciplines: Road; Cyclo-cross
- Role: Rider

Amateur teams
- 2014–2015: BTWIN U19 Racing Team
- 2017–2018: Team Probikeshop Saint-Etienne Loir
- 2019–2020: EC Saint-Etienne Loire
- 2021: Vendée U

Professional team
- 2022–: Total Direct Énergie

Major wins
- One-day races and Classics Maryland Cycling Classic (2025)

Sandy Dujardin (born 29 May 1997) is a French cyclist, who currently rides for UCI ProTeam Team TotalEnergies.

== Major results ==
=== Road ===
2014
1st Mountains classification, Ain'Ternational-Rhône Alpes-Valromey Tour
2021
10th Overall Tour d'Eure-et-Loir
2022 (1 pro win)
Tour du Rwanda

1st Sprints classification
1st Stage 1

3rd La Roue Tourangelle
3rd Tour du Finistère
6th Grand Prix de Denain
6th Druivenkoers Overijse
7th Paris–Tours
8th Tour de Vendée
9th Paris–Chauny
2023
2nd Tour du Finistère
3rd Tour de Vendée
7th Overall Boucles de la Mayenne
7th Circuit de Wallonie
9th Antwerp Port Epic
10th Bretagne Classic
10th Super 8 Classic
10th Boucles de l'Aulne
2024
2nd Route Adélie
5th Road race, National Championships
6th Antwerp Port Epic
2025 (1)
1st Maryland Cycling Classic
2nd Polynormande
4th Boucles de l'Aulne
5th Grand Prix Criquielion
5th Muur Classic Geraardsbergen
9th Gran Premio Castellón
10th Paris–Camembert

==== Grand Tour general classification results timeline ====
Grand Tour	2024
Giro d'Italia	—
Tour de France	132
Vuelta a España	—

Legend
—	Did not compete
DNF	Did not finish

=== Cyclo-cross ===
2014–2015
1st Overall Junior Coupe de France

1st Sisteron
2nd Lanarvily

1st Nommay Juniors
2018–2019
3rd National Under-23 Championships
Under-23 Coupe de France

3rd Razès
