= Anatolii Budiak =

Ukrainian cyclist (born 1995)

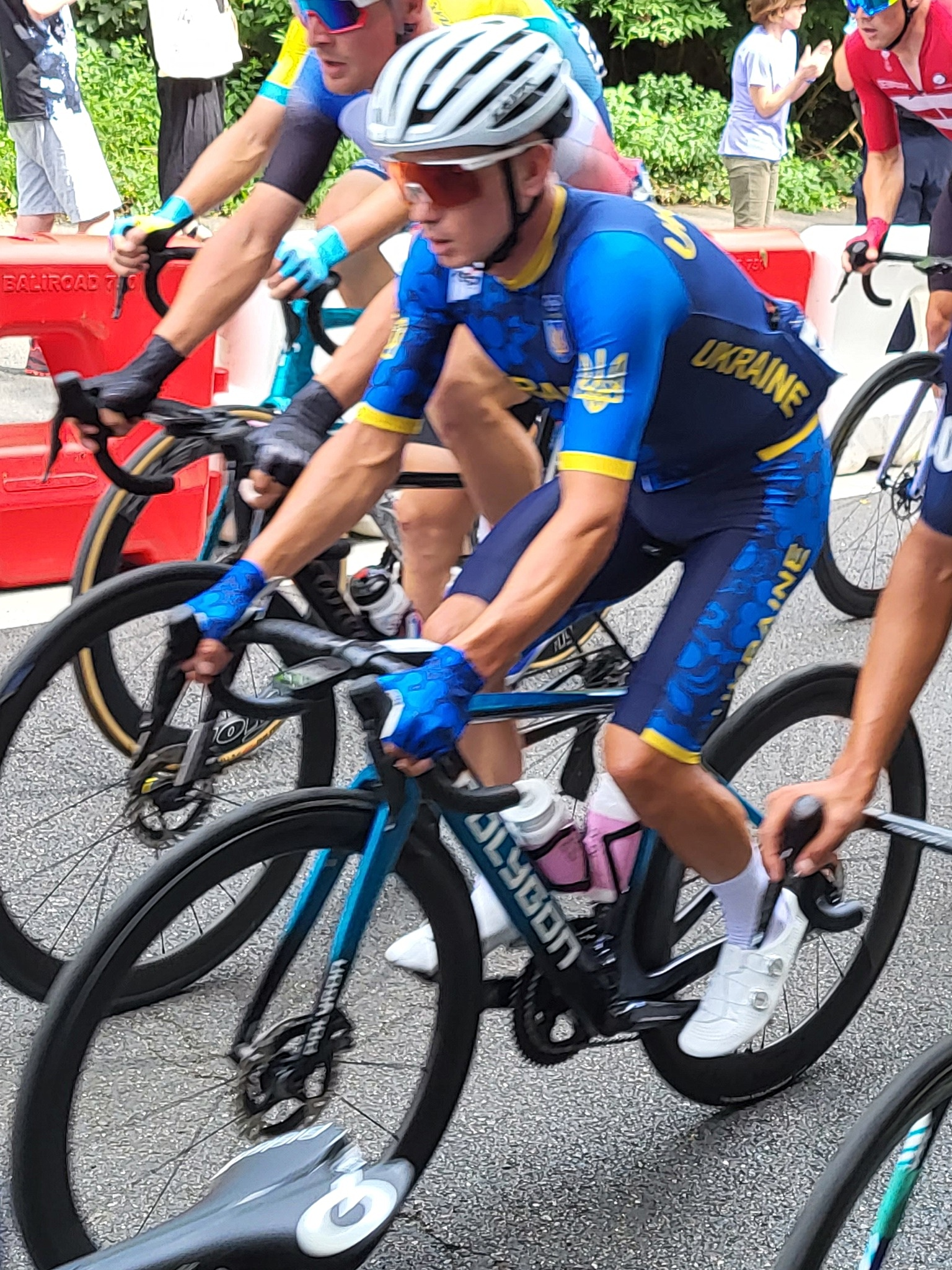
- Budiak competing at the 2024 Summer Olympics

Personal information
- Full name: Anatolii Volodymyrovych Budiak
- Born: 29 September 1995 (age 31) Vinnytsia, Ukraine
- Height: 1.69 m (5 ft 7 in)
- Weight: 53 kg (117 lb)

Cycling career
- Sport: Cycling
- Current team: Madar Pro Cycling Team
- Discipline: Road
- Role: Rider

Amateur team
- 2018: ULB Sports–Natural Greatness

Professional teams
- 2014–2015: ISD Continental Team
- 2017: ISD–Jorbi
- 2018: Lviv Cycling Team
- 2019–2020: Wibatech Merx 7R
- 2021: Spor Toto Cycling Team
- 2022–2025: Terengganu Polygon Cycling Team
- 2026-: Madar Pro Cycling Team

Major wins
- One-day races and Classics National Time Trial Championships (2025)

Anatolii Volodymyrovych Budiak (Ukrainian: Анатолій Володимирович Будяк; born 29 September 1995) is a Ukrainian cyclist, who currently rides for UCI Continental team Madar Pro Cycling Team.

He was formerly with Terengganu Cycling Team.

At the 2015 Tour de l'Avenir, after finishing 14th overall, he tested positive for mesocarb, and was suspended by the UCI until 27 February 2017.

== Major results ==
2015
2nd Overall Volta a Portugal do Futuro

1st Mountains classification
1st Young rider classification

5th Overall Bałtyk–Karkonosze Tour
10th Grand Prix of Sochi Mayor
2017
2nd Road race, National Under-23 Road Championships
4th Overall Tour of Mersin
5th Road race, National Road Championships
8th Overall Tour of Fuzhou
8th Overall Grand Prix Priessnitz spa
2018
3rd Overall Tour of Małopolska
7th Horizon Park Race for Peace
2019
2nd Overall Tour of Małopolska

1st Mountains classification
1st Stage 1

2nd Horizon Park Race for Peace
5th Chabany Race
7th Horizon Park Race Maidan
8th Tour de Ribas
9th Overall Tour of Bihor
2020
1st Grand Prix World's Best High Altitude
1st Grand Prix Develi
2nd Road race, National Road Championships
2nd GP Manavgat
3rd Grand Prix Velo Alanya
4th Overall Tour of Małopolska
8th Grand Prix Cappadocia
8th Grand Prix Mount Erciyes
2021
1st Overall Tour of Mevlana

1st Stage 3

1st Grand Prix Kayseri
2nd Road race, National Road Championships
3rd Overall Tour of Małopolska

1st Prologue & Stage 3

4th Grand Prix Velo Alanya
4th Grand Prix Gündoğmuş
2022
1st Grand Prix Mediterranean
1st Grand Prix Gündoğmuş
1st Grand Prix Kayseri
2nd Overall Tour du Rwanda

1st Stage 6

3rd Grand Prix Alanya
3rd Grand Prix Cappadocia
3rd Grand Prix Kapuzbaşı
4th Overall Tour of Sharjah
4th Grand Prix Erciyes
5th Overall Tour of Azerbaijan (Iran)
5th Overall Tour of Sakarya
9th Overall Tour of Antalya
10th Overall International Tour of Hellas
2023
1st Grand Prix Kaisareia
2nd Overall Tour of Azerbaijan (Iran)

1st Stage 4

2nd Tour of Kandovan
7th Alanya Cup
8th Classique de l'île Maurice
9th Overall Tour of Sharjah
10th Overall Tour de Maurice
2024
2nd Road race, National Road Championships
3rd Overall Tour of Thailand
3rd Overall Tour of Sharjah
10th Overall Tour of Japan
2025
1st Time trial, National Road Championships
3rd Overall Trans-Himalaya Cycling Race
6th GP Antalya
7th Dhofar Classic
9th Road race, National Road Championships
