= Leo Hayter =

British cyclist

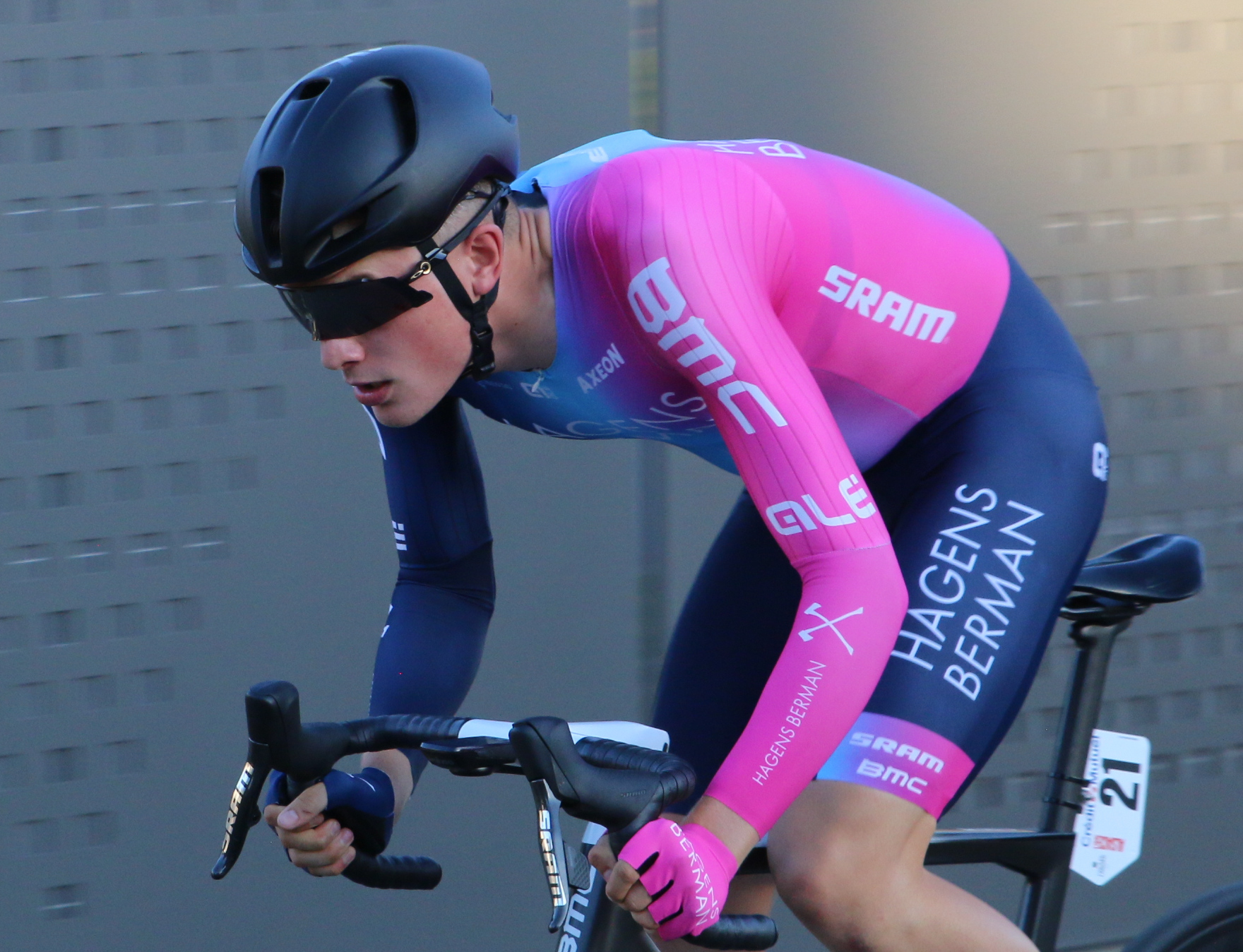

Personal information
- Born: 10 August 2001 (age 25) London, England
- Height: 1.78 m (5 ft 10 in)
- Weight: 63 kg (139 lb)

Cycling career
- Sport: Cycling
- Current team: Modern Adventure Pro Cycling
- Discipline: Road
- Role: Rider

Amateur team
- 2013–2019: VC Londres

Professional teams
- 2020–2021: Development Team Sunweb
- 2022: Hagens Berman Axeon
- 2022: INEOS Grenadiers (stagiaire)
- 2023–2024: INEOS Grenadiers
- 2025: Voster ATS Team
- 2026–: Modern Adventure Pro Cycling
Medal record
Representing United Kingdom
Men's road bicycle racing
World Championships
Bronze medal – third place	2022 Wollongong	Under-23 time trial

Leo Hayter (born 10 August 2001) is a British racing cyclist, who rides for Modern Adventure Pro Cycling. He began his professional career with UCI WorldTeam Netcompany–Ineos.

== Career ==
As a Junior road cyclist in 2019, Hayter won 1.1 UCI level junior races at the Omloop van Borsele and Trofee van Vlaanderen. In 2021, he won the Liège–Bastogne–Liège Espoirs. In 2022, he won two consecutive stages and the overall title at the Giro Ciclistico d'Italia It was announced on 1 August 2022 he would join INEOS Grenadiers as a stagiare immediately and then join on a three-year contract from 2023.

Hayter paused his professional career in August 2024, citing issues with his mental health. A year later, he announced an intention to return to professional cycling, aiming to make his first race the end-of-season Chrono des Nations, with a view to competing more frequently in 2026. Hayter signed with the Voster ATS Team to secure entry into the race, before joining Modern Adventure Pro Cycling for 2026.

== Personal ==
Hayter is the nephew of former New Young Pony Club keyboardist Lou Hayter. His older brother Ethan Hayter is also a racing cyclist who joined Team INEOS in 2020.

== Major results ==
=== Road ===
2018
2nd Overall Junior Tour of Wales

1st Prologue

2019
1st National Junior Series
1st Trofee van Vlaanderen
1st EPZ Omloop van Borsele
2nd E3 BinckBank Classic Junioren
4th Road race, National Junior Championships
4th Kuurne–Brussels–Kuurne Juniors
8th Time trial, UCI World Junior Championships
2020
1st Stage 3 (TTT) Ronde de l'Isard
2021
National Under-23 Championships

1st Time trial
3rd Road race

1st Liège–Bastogne–Liège Espoirs
1st Stage 2 Tour de Bretagne
2022
1st Time trial, National Under-23 Championships
1st Overall Giro Ciclistico d'Italia

1st Stages 2 & 3

2nd Trofeo Città di Meldola
3rd Time trial, UCI World Under-23 Championships
10th Overall Tour du Rwanda
2023
5th Overall Settimana Internazionale di Coppi e Bartali
2026
5th Overall Tour Poitou-Charentes en Nouvelle-Aquitaine

=== Track ===
2019
UEC European Junior Championships

1st Team pursuit
3rd Individual pursuit
