= 2022 UCI Africa Tour =

Edition of the international african cycling calendar of 2022

- Eighteenth edition of the UCI Africa Tour

Details
- Dates: 29 October 2021 – 8 October 2022
- Location: Africa
- Races: 5

The 2022 UCI Africa Tour was the 18th season of the UCI Africa Tour. The season began on 29 October 2021 with the Tour du Faso and ended on 8 October 2022.

The points leader, based on the cumulative results of previous races, wears the UCI Africa Tour cycling jersey.

Throughout the season, points are awarded to the top finishers of stages within stage races and the final general classification standings of each of the stages races and one-day events. The quality and complexity of a race also determines how many points are awarded to the top finishers: the higher the UCI rating of a race, the more points are awarded. The UCI ratings from highest to lowest are as follows:

- Multi-day events: 2.1 and 2.2
- One-day events: 1.1 and 1.2

== Events ==
=== 2021–2022 ===
Races in the 2021–2022 UCI Africa Tour
Race	Rating	Date	Winner	Team
(Burkina Faso) Tour du Faso	2.2	29 October–7 November 2021	Daniel Bichlmann (GER)	Team KIBAG-OBOR-CKT
Tour du Rwanda	2.1	20 – 27 February 2022	Natnael Tesfatsion (ERI)	Drone Hopper–Androni Giocattoli
(Benin) Tour du Bénin	2.2	2 – 8 May 2022	Marcel Peschges (GER)	Team Embrace The World Cycling
(Cameroon) Tour du Cameroun	2.2	4 – 12 June 2022	Moise Mugisha (RWA)	Rwanda (national team)
(Cameroon) Grand Prix Chantal Biya	2.2	3 – 8 October 2022	Axel Taillandier (FRA)	Team France Défense
