= Grand Prix World's Best High Altitude =

Race details
- Date: September
- Region: Kayseri Province
- Discipline: Road
- Competition: UCI Europe Tour
- Type: One-day race

History
- First edition: 2020
- Editions: 1 (as of 2020)
- First winner: Anatoliy Budyak (UKR) (men); Mariia Novolodskaia (RUS) (women)
- Most wins: No repeat winners
- Most recent: Anatoliy Budyak (UKR) (men); Mariia Novolodskaia (RUS) (women)

The Grand Prix World's Best High Altitude was a men's and women's one-day road cycling race held in Turkey in 2020. It is rated as a 1.2 event on the UCI Europe Tour. Anatoliy Budyak of the Ukrainian national team and Mariia Novolodskaia of the Moscow regional team won the men's and women's events, respectively.
