= Ángel Madrazo =

Spanish road bicycle racer (born 1988)

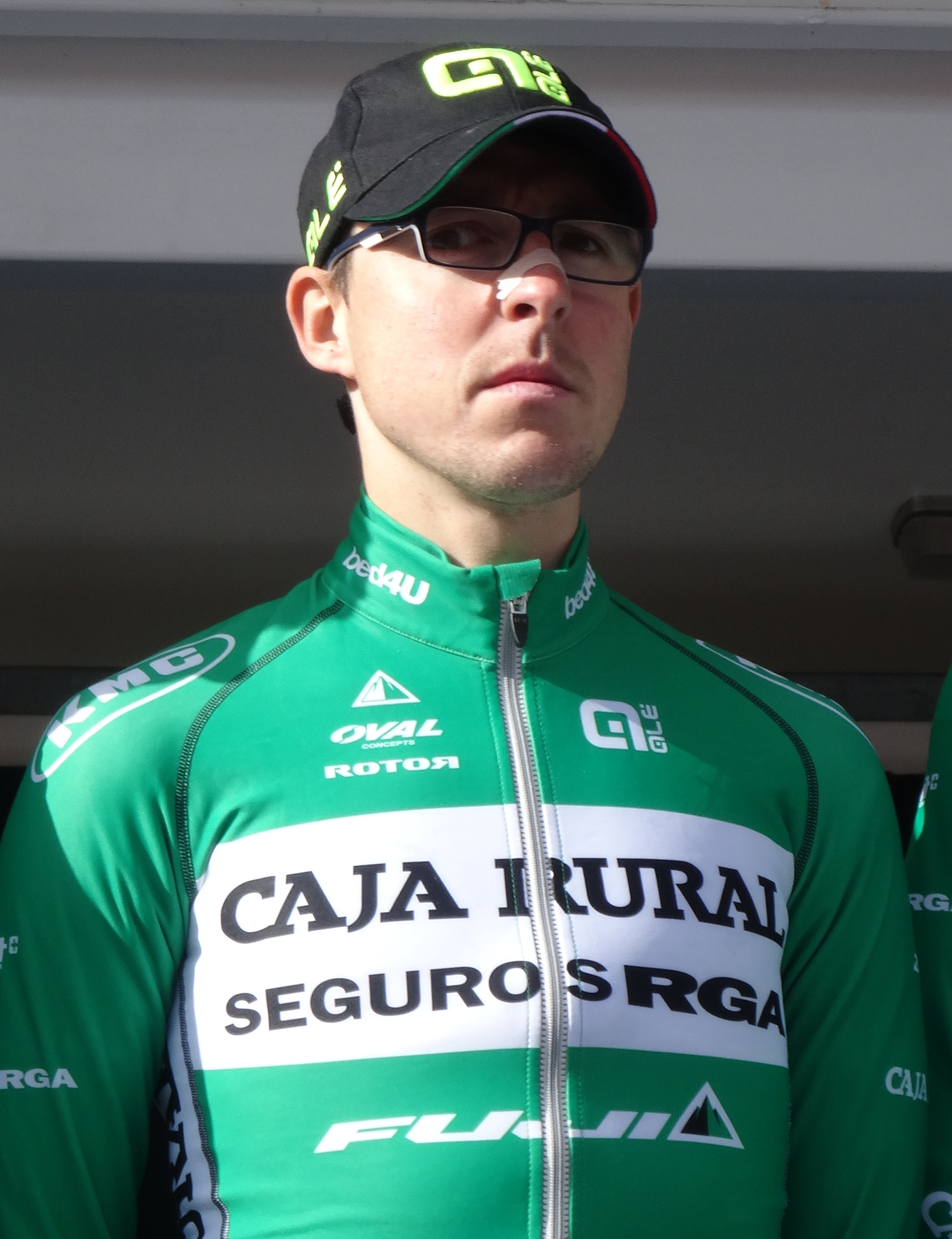
- Madrazo in 2015

Personal information
- Full name: Ángel Madrazo Ruiz
- Nicknames: El Gorrion de Cazoña; (English: The sparrow of Cazoña); McLovin
- Born: 30 July 1988 (age 38) Santander, Cantabria, Spain
- Height: 1.72 m (5 ft 7 1/2 in)
- Weight: 63 kg (139 lb)

Cycling career
- Sport: Cycling
- Current team: Retired
- Discipline: Road
- Role: Rider

Amateur teams
- 2007–2008: Saunier Duval–Prodir amateur
- 2008: Scott–American Beef (stagiaire)

Professional teams
- 2009–2013: Caisse d'Epargne
- 2014–2016: Caja Rural–Seguros RGA
- 2017–2018: Delko–Marseille Provence KTM
- 2019–2023: Burgos BH

Major wins
- Grand Tours Vuelta a España 1 individual stage (2019)

Ángel Madrazo Ruiz (born 30 July 1988) is a Spanish former professional road racing cyclist, who competed as a professional from 2009 to 2023.

Madrazo left the Movistar Team at the end of the 2013 season, and joined Caja Rural–Seguros RGA for the 2014 season. In August 2016 Delko–Marseille Provence KTM announced that Madrazo would join them for the 2017 and 2018 seasons.

== Major results ==
2008
8th Overall Circuito Montañés

1st Stage 5

2011
5th GP Miguel Induráin
5th Prueba Villafranca de Ordizia
2012
3rd GP Miguel Induráin
5th Overall Tour Méditerranéen
5th Klasika Primavera
6th Tre Valli Varesine
2013
Tour of Britain

1st Sprints classification
1st Mountains classification

2nd Prueba Villafranca de Ordizia
2014
2nd Giro dell'Emilia
8th Overall Tour du Gévaudan Languedoc-Roussillon

1st Mountains classification

2015
1st Prueba Villafranca de Ordizia
1st Mountains classification Tour du Gévaudan Languedoc-Roussillon
3rd Giro dell'Emilia
7th Circuito de Getxo
Combativity award Stages 8 & 18 Vuelta a España
2016
1st Stage 4 Étoile de Bessèges
2nd Prueba Villafranca de Ordizia
4th Circuito de Getxo
7th Overall Vuelta a Asturias
2017
1st Mountains classification Circuit de la Sarthe
2nd Circuito de Getxo
9th Overall Tour of Austria
2018
7th Overall Tour of Austria
7th Tour du Gévaudan Occitanie
8th Overall Vuelta a Aragón
8th Overall Tour of Almaty
2019
Vuelta a España

1st Stage 5
Held after Stages 2–15
Combativity award Stages 2, 3 & 16

6th Overall Troféu Joaquim Agostinho
2021
2nd Vuelta a Murcia
Combativity award Stage 4 Vuelta a España
2022
4th Overall Tour du Rwanda

=== Grand Tour general classification results timeline ===
Grand Tour	2011	2012	2013	2014	2015	2016	2017	2018	2019	2020	2021
Giro d'Italia	Has not contested during career										
Tour de France	Has not contested during career										
Vuelta a España	DNF	—	—	—	44	DNF	—	—	119	43	63

Legend
—	Did not compete
DNF	Did not finish
