= Maryland Cycling Classic =

Road cycling race in the United States

Race details
- Date: September 4, 2022
- Region: Maryland
- Discipline: Road
- Competition: UCI America Tour; UCI ProSeries (1.Pro)
- Type: Single-day
- Organiser: Maryland Sports Commission
- Race director: Terry Hasseltine
- Web site: www.marylandcyclingclassic.us

History
- First edition: 2022
- Editions: 3 (as of 2025)
- First winner: Sep Vanmarcke (BEL)
- Most wins: No repeat winners
- Most recent: Sandy Dujardin (FRA)

The Maryland Cycling Classic is a one-day road cycling race in the state of Maryland. The inaugural race was September 4, 2022. The category 1.Pro race is a part of the UCI America Tour and the UCI ProSeries calendars.

== History ==
The race was originally scheduled for September 6, 2020. However, due to the COVID-19 pandemic, the race was first postponed to 2021 and then again to 2022.

The 194 km/120.4 mile route starts in northern Baltimore County at the headquarters of Kelly Benefits, and ends in downtown Baltimore. The race begins with riders navigating the rolling terrain of rural northern Baltimore County while the final, flatter laps loop through Baltimore City, ending at the Inner Harbor.

The race is the only one-day race in the United States part of the UCI ProSeries and with the UCI World Tour Tour of California going on hiatus in 2020, it is the highest stature one-day race in the country. This makes the Maryland Cycling Classic the highest level road cycling race in the United States (highest level one-day and tied with overall highest level with the Tour of Utah.)

The winner of the inaugural Maryland Cycling Classic on Sunday, September 4, 2022 was Sep Vanmarcke of Belgium riding for Israel-Premier Tech with a time of 4:34:45. Nickolas Zukowsky of Canada riding for Human Powered Health and Neilson Powless of the United States riding for EF Education-EasyPost rounded out the top three.

The cycling race is part of a four-day weekend community celebration of healthy lifestyle and living with participatory events, festival with interactive exhibits, local foods and drinks along with other fun activities. The event is endorsed by Maryland and Baltimore Civic Leaders while owned and operated by Sport and Entertainment Corporation of Maryland (Sport Corp). The event is managed and marketed by industry leaders Medalist Sports and KOM Sports Marketing.

The Maryland Cycling Classic also includes the charity Bridges of Hope Ride Presented by Kelly Benefits, which provides the opportunity for cycling enthusiasts to ride sections of the Maryland Cycling Classic (MCC) course the day before the pro-cycling event, while raising funds for the UnitedHealthcare Children's Foundation (UHCCF).

According to race director Terry Hasseltine, the plan for the Maryland Cycling Classic "is to convince the UCI to allow the Maryland Cycling Classic to add a women’s race next year [2023] and then another day of racing to the 2024 version."

The 2023 Maryland Cycling Classic supported by UnitedHealthcare took place on Sunday, September 3, 2023.

The 2024 race was cancelled following the Francis Scott Key Bridge collapse in March 2024 which heavily impacted traffic in the Baltimore region. The 2025 edition of the race will add a women's race, held on the same day and on a similar course.

== Winners ==
=== Men ===
Year	Country	Rider	Team
2021	No race due to COVID-19 pandemic		
2022	Belgium	Sep Vanmarcke	Israel–Premier Tech
2023	Denmark	Mattias Skjelmose	Lidl–Trek
2024	No race due to collapse of the Francis Scott Key Bridge		
2025	France	Sandy Dujardin	Team TotalEnergies

=== Women ===
Year	Country	Rider	Team
2025	Poland	Agnieszka Skalniak-Sójka	Canyon//SRAM Zondacrypto

=== Multiple winners ===
Riders in italics are active.

=== Wins per country ===
Wins	Country
1	Belgium, Denmark, France
