= 2025 Maryland Cycling Classic =

2025 UCI ProSeries

Race details
- Dates: 6 September 2025
- Stages: 1
- Distance: 172.8 km (107.4 mi)
- Winning time: 3h 48' 25"

Results
	Winner	Sandy Dujardin (FRA)	(Team TotalEnergies)
	Second	Jonas Abrahamsen (NOR)	(Uno-X Mobility)
	Third	Marius Mayrhofer (GER)	(Tudor Pro Cycling Team)

The 2025 Maryland Cycling Classic was the third edition of the Maryland Cycling Classic. It was held on 6 September 2025 as part of the 2025 UCI ProSeries calendar.

== Teams ==
Three UCI WorldTeams, six UCI ProTeams, three UCI Continental teams and the American national team made up the thirteen teams that participated in the race.

UCI WorldTeams

- EF Education–EasyPost
- Lidl–Trek
- Team Jayco–AlUla

UCI ProTeams

- Israel–Premier Tech
- Team Solution Tech–Vini Fantini
- Team Novo Nordisk
- Team TotalEnergies
- Tudor Pro Cycling Team
- Uno-X Mobility

UCI Continental Teams

- Team Medellín–EPM
- Project Echelon Racing
- Team Skyline

National Teams

- United States

== Result ==
Result
Rank	Rider	Team	Time
1	Sandy Dujardin (FRA)	Team TotalEnergies	3h 48' 25"
2	Jonas Abrahamsen (NOR)	Uno-X Mobility	+ 0"
3	Marius Mayrhofer (GER)	Tudor Pro Cycling Team	+ 0"
4	Brandon McNulty (USA)	United States	+ 0"
5	Mauro Schmid (SUI)	Team Jayco–AlUla	+ 0"
6	Anders Halland Johannessen (NOR)	Uno-X Mobility	+ 0"
7	Larry Warbasse (USA)	Tudor Pro Cycling Team	+ 3"
8	Guillaume Boivin (CAN)	Israel–Premier Tech	+ 38"
9	Marijn van den Berg (NED)	EF Education–EasyPost	+ 1' 38"
10	Matyáš Kopecký (CZE)	Team Novo Nordisk	+ 1' 38"
