= 2022 Maryland Cycling Classic =

2022 UCI ProSeries

Race details
- Dates: 4 September 2022
- Stages: 1
- Distance: 194 km (120.5 mi)
- Winning time: 4h 34' 45"

Results
	Winner	Sep Vanmarcke (BEL)	(Israel–Premier Tech)
	Second	Nickolas Zukowsky (CAN)	(Human Powered Health)
	Third	Neilson Powless (USA)	(EF Education–EasyPost)

The 2022 Maryland Cycling Classic was the first edition of the Maryland Cycling Classic. It was held on 4 September 2022 as part of the 2022 UCI ProSeries calendar.

== Teams ==
4 of the 19 UCI WorldTeams, two UCI ProTeams, nine UCI Continental teams and the American national team made up the 16 teams that participated in the race. In total, 111 riders started the race.

UCI WorldTeams

- Team BikeExchange–Jayco
- EF Education–EasyPost
- Israel–Premier Tech
- Trek–Segafredo

UCI ProTeams

- Human Powered Health
- Team Novo Nordisk

UCI Continental Teams

- Team Corratec
- EvoPro Racing
- Hagens Berman Axeon
- L39ION of Los Angeles
- Team Medellín–EPM
- Panamá es Cultura y Valores
- ProTouch
- Team Skyline
- Toronto Hustle

National Teams

- United States

== Result ==
Result
Rank	Rider	Team	Time
1	Sep Vanmarcke (BEL)	Israel–Premier Tech	4h 34' 45"
2	Nickolas Zukowsky (CAN)	Human Powered Health	+ 0"
3	Neilson Powless (USA)	EF Education–EasyPost	+ 0"
4	Toms Skujiņš (LAT)	Trek–Segafredo	+ 1"
5	Andrea Piccolo (ITA)	EF Education–EasyPost	+ 5"
6	Magnus Cort (DEN)	EF Education–EasyPost	+ 1' 06"
7	Jenthe Biermans (BEL)	Israel–Premier Tech	+ 1' 06"
8	Quinn Simmons (USA)	Trek–Segafredo	+ 1' 11"
9	Alexandre Balmer (SUI)	Team BikeExchange–Jayco	+ 1' 11"
10	Róbigzon Oyola (COL)	Team Medellín–EPM	+ 1' 11"
