= Aimable Manirakiza =

Burundian human rights activist

- Occupation: Human rights activist

Aimable Manirakiza is the Founder and chief executive officer of the Centre for Development and Enterprises Great Lakes, at libertarian think tank operating in Burundi, the Democratic Republic of the Congo, and Rwanda.

In 2015, when the president of Burundi sought an illegal third term, Manirakiza joined peaceful protests. However, government forces cracked down on the protests and he was forced to flee Burundi. While in Kenya, Manirakiza came into contact with the Atlas Network and was introduced to free market libertarian ideals. In 2017, he returned to Burundi and founded the CDE Great Lakes, impacting the nation's legislature. In 2020, Manirakiza won the Africa Liberty Award.
