= Dominik Nerz =

German road cyclist (born 1989)

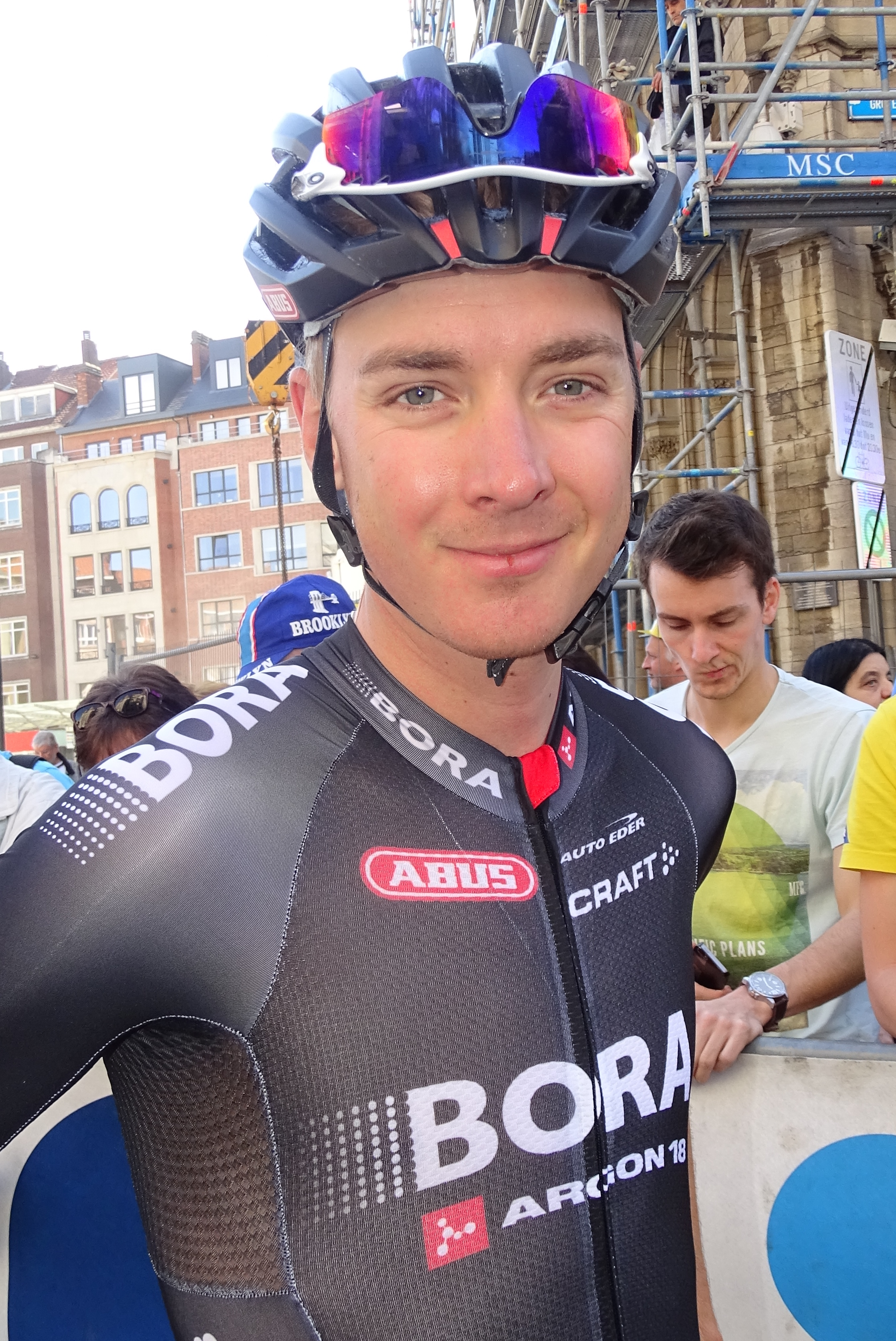
- Nerz in 2015

Personal information
- Full name: Dominik Nerz
- Born: 25 August 1989 (age 37) Wangen im Allgäu, West Germany
- Height: 1.80 m (5 ft 11 in)
- Weight: 67 kg (148 lb)

Cycling career
- Sport: Cycling
- Current team: Retired
- Discipline: Road
- Role: Rider
- Rider type: Climber; Stage races

Amateur teams
- 2008: Ista
- 2009: Continental Team Milram

Professional teams
- 2010: Team Milram
- 2011–2012: Liquigas–Cannondale
- 2013–2014: BMC Racing Team
- 2015–2016: Bora–Argon 18

Dominik Nerz (born 25 August 1989) is a German former professional road cyclist, who competed professionally between 2010 and 2016 for the Team Milram, Liquigas–Cannondale, BMC Racing Team and Bora–Argon 18 teams. A junior national champion on the track, Nerz primarily competed on the road.

== Career ==
After numerous wins at the junior level, he joined Team Milram's development setup and won the German under-23 national road race title. After a single season for Milram's continental team, he joined the senior squad and turned professional.

After Milram's disbandment, he joined Liquigas–Cannondale for 2011, and rode his first Grand Tour later that year – the 2011 Vuelta a España. Riding in support of Vincenzo Nibali, he finished 38th overall and was the highest ranked German in the general classification. He also finished third on stage 19, for his best result of the season.

Nerz left Liquigas–Cannondale at the end of the 2012 season, and joined the BMC Racing Team for the 2013 season. In September 2014, Bora–Argon 18 announced that they had signed Nerz on a two-year deal from 2015, as a team leader for the Grand Tours and similar stage races.

In October 2016, Nerz confirmed his retirement from competition for health reasons.

== Major results ==
2006
1st Team pursuit, National Junior Track Championships
2007
1st Overall Giro della Toscana Juniors

1st Mountains classification
1st Stage 1

2nd Time trial, National Junior Road Championships
2nd Overall Trofeo Karlsberg

1st Mountains classification
1st Stage 3a (ITT)

2008
3rd GP Hydraulika Mikolasek
7th Overall Tour de Berlin
7th Tour de Berne
2009
1st Road race, National Under-23 Road Championships
1st Stage 6 Giro della Valle d'Aosta
7th Overall Giro del Friuli-Venezia Giulia
2010
8th Grand Prix of Aargau Canton
2012
2nd Eschborn–Frankfurt City Loop
5th GP Miguel Induráin
6th Overall Tour of Slovenia
2014
9th Overall Tour de Pologne
2015
1st Stage 1 (TTT) Giro del Trentino
2016
7th Overall Critérium International

=== Grand Tour general classification results timeline ===
Grand Tour	2011	2012	2013	2014	2015
Giro d'Italia	Did not contest during career				
Tour de France	—	47	—	—	DNF
Vuelta a España	38	—	14	18	—

Legend
—	Did not compete
DNF	Did not finish
