= Canal Olympia =

African cinema and theater company

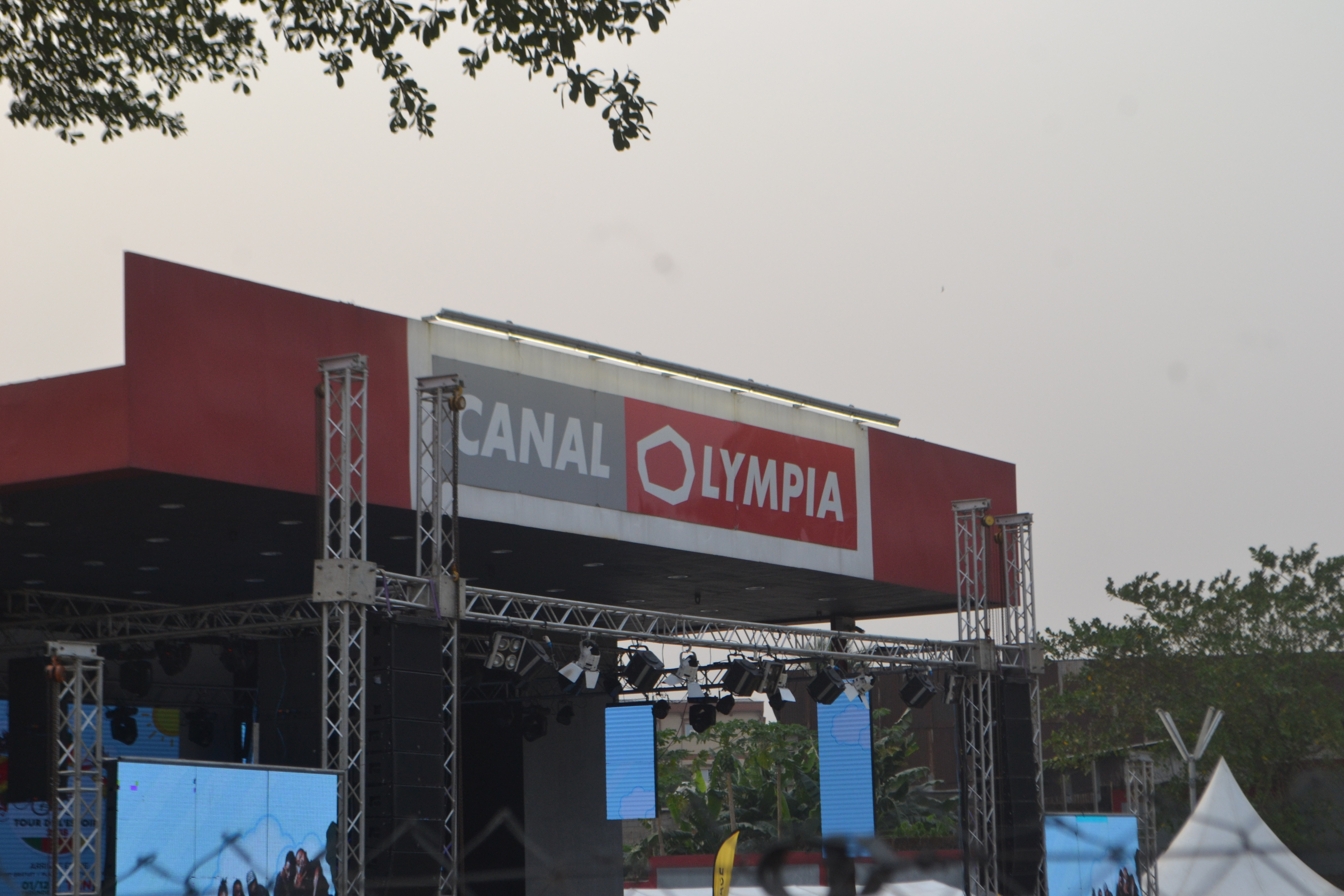
A Canal Olympia cinema and performance hall in Douala

CanalOlympia is an African cinemas and theater company spread across the continent. The company has cinema theaters in Benin, Burkina Faso, Senegal, Nigeria, Rwanda, Togo, Gabon, Guinea and Cameroon, among others.

== History ==
The CanalOlympia cinema company first originated in 2017.

On April 27, 2018, it was announced in Paris, France, that Orange and Vivendi had signed an agreement with CanalOlympia, whereupon Orange's Cinedays program would be made available for viewership to clients visiting CanalOlympia movie theaters.

During 2018, the company opened its tenth facility and second one in the city of Lomé, Togo.
