= Queen Kalimpinya =

Rwandan rally driver and beauty queen (born 1998)

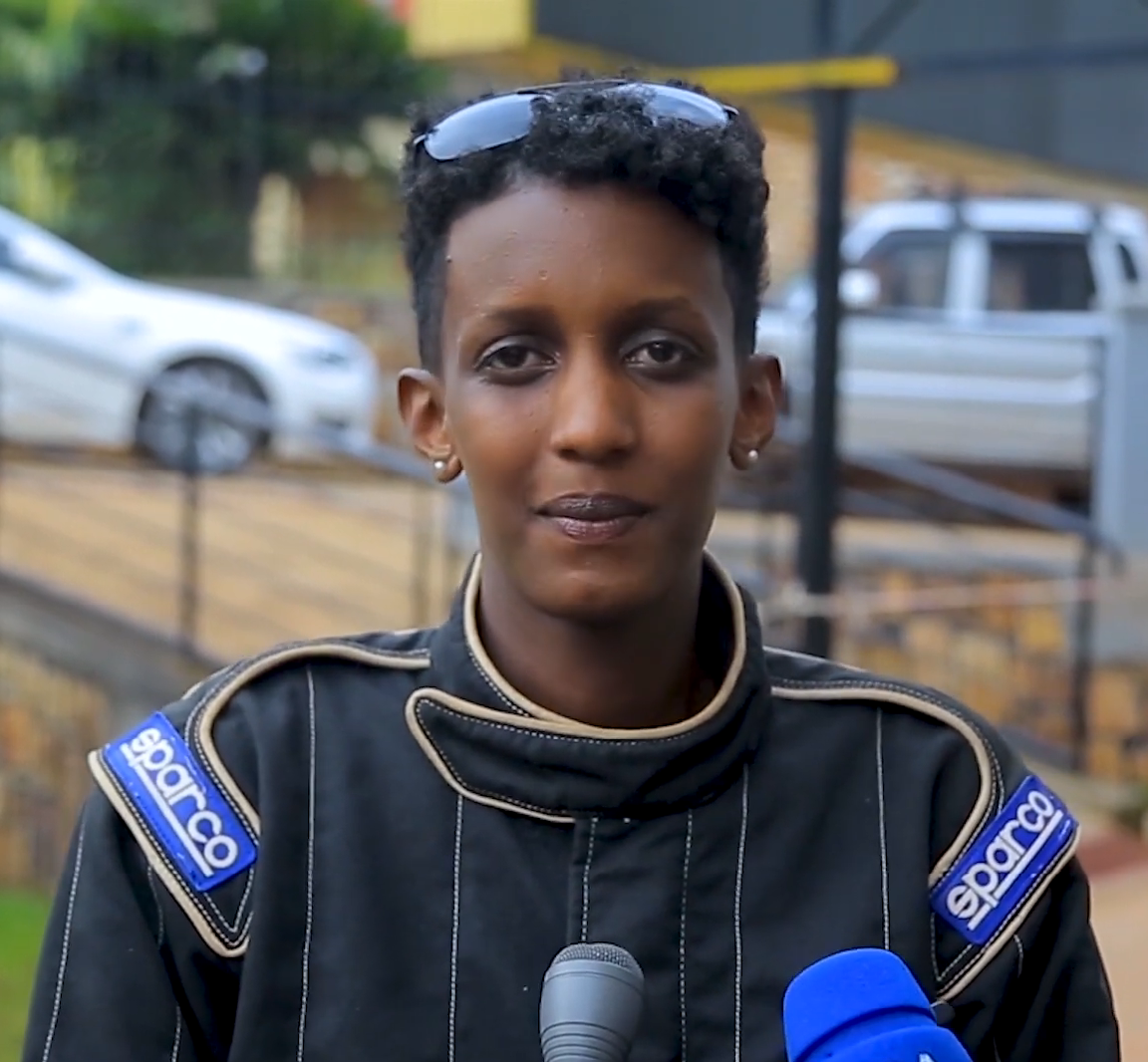
- Kalimpinya in 2023
- Born: August 6, 1998 (age 27); Gasabo District, Kigali, Rwanda
- Occupations: Rally driver, beauty queen

Queen Kalimpinya (born August 6, 1998) is a Rwandan rally driver and beauty queen. Kalimpinya was the third runner-up of Miss Rwanda in 2017, and became Rwanda's first female rally driver in 2022.

== Biography ==
Queen Kalimpinya was born August 6, 1998, in the Gasabo District of Kigali, Rwanda, the youngest of five children. Queen attended primary school at Ecole Primaire Cyahafi and APACOPE and continued her secondary education at St Aloys School in Rwamagana, before completing her senior year at Lycée de Kigali, where she graduated in 2015. She holds an undergraduate degree in business administration and an MBA in project management, and works at an Asantii garment factory in Kigali. She is Christian, worshiping at Noble Family Church and Women Foundation Ministries led by Mignone Alice Kabera; she was baptized in May 2023.

At the age of nineteen, Kalimpinya participated in Miss Rwanda 2017, where she was the third runner-up.

Queen Kalimpinya began rally racing in 2019. She started as a co-driver for Yoto Fabrice, getting fourth place in Sprint Rally All Star 2022 and second in the ‘Nyirangarama Sprint Rally’ held in May 2022. In September 2022, she participated in the Rwanda Mountain Gorilla Rally as a full driver for the first time, with Olivier Ngabo as her co-driver, becoming the first female Rwandan rally driver. They did not finish the race due to mechanical issues.

Kalimpinya participated in the Huye Rally in 2023, coming second. In 2026, she became the first woman to compete in the Safari Rally in 42 years. For the competition, her car was upgraded from a Subaru GC8 to a Subaru Impreza WRX STI GVB. The same year, she competed with the KCB Bank Kenya Rally Team in the 2026 Pearl of Africa Rally with co-driver Alain Gasarabwe. They came eighth overall in the ARC classification and second in the ARC2 category.

Kalimpinya received the 2024 Women in Leadership award in the sports category.
