= André Drege =

Norwegian bicycle racer (1999–2024)

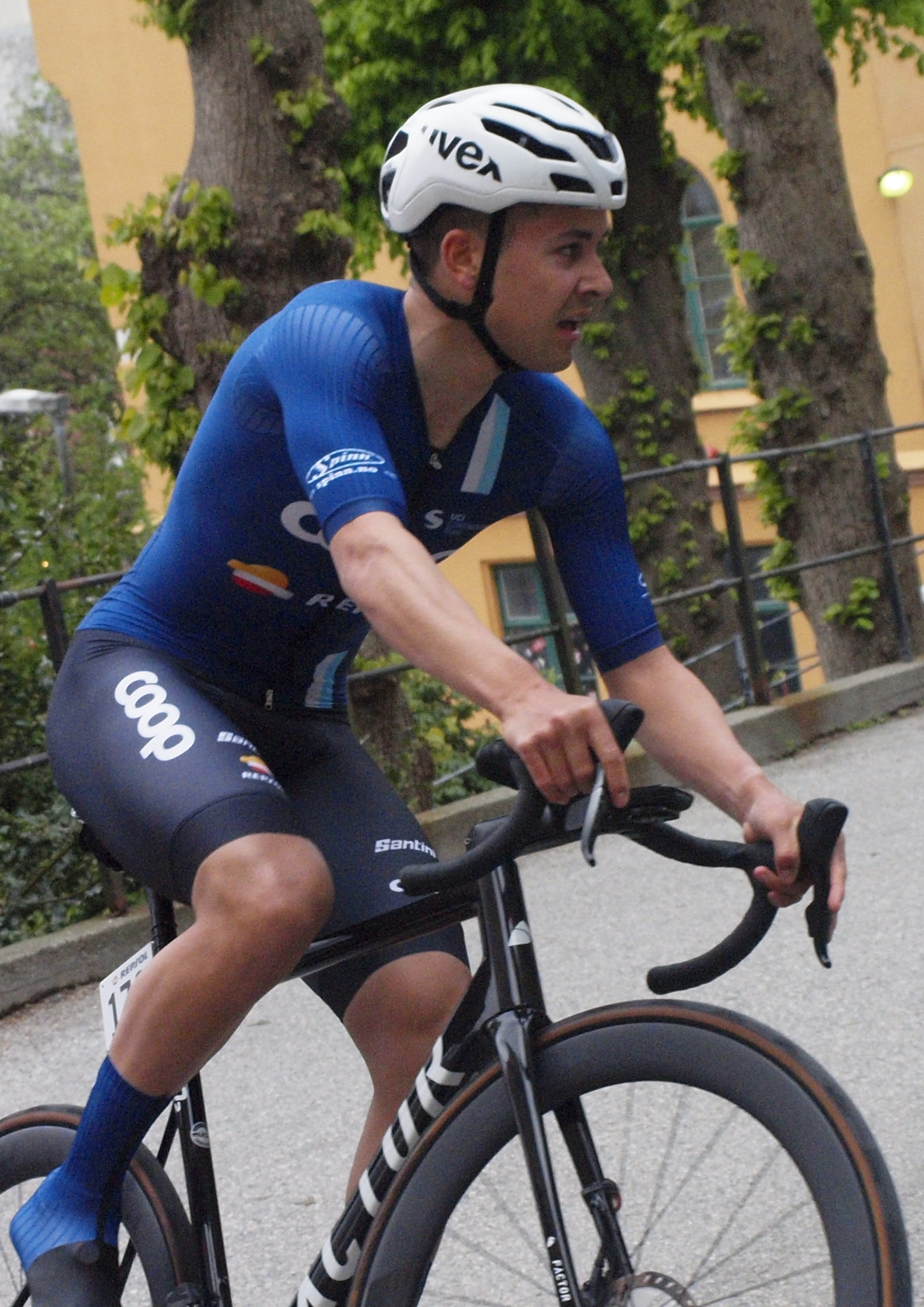
- Drege at the 2023 Tour of Norway.

Personal information
- Born: 4 May 1999 Ålesund, Norway
- Died: 6 July 2024 (aged 25) Heiligenblut am Großglockner, Carinthia, Austria
- Height: 1.84 m (6 ft 0 in)
- Weight: 75 kg (165 lb)

Cycling career
- Sport: Cycling
- Discipline: Road
- Role: Rider

Amateur team
- 2017–2021: Lillehammer Cykleklubb

Professional teams
- 2021: Team Coop (stagiaire)
- 2022–2024: Team Coop

André Drege (4 May 1999 – 6 July 2024) was a Norwegian cyclist, who rode for UCI Continental team Team Coop–Repsol. Drege died following a crash during the descent of the Grossglockner High Alpine Road on stage 4 of the 2024 Tour of Austria. He spent his entire professional career with Team Coop, taking nine UCI level wins, seven of which were in 2024.

== Major results ==
2021
7th Himmerland Rundt
7th Gylne Gutuer
9th Skive–Løbet
2022
1st International Rhodes Grand Prix
1st Gylne Gutuer
2023
1st Mountains classification, Visit South Aegean Islands
3rd Overall International Tour of Rhodes
2024
1st Overall Visit South Aegean Islands

1st Stages 1 & 2

1st Overall International Tour of Rhodes

1st Prologue

1st Stage 1 Circuit des Ardennes
2nd International Rhodes Grand Prix
8th Overall Tour du Loir et Cher

1st Stage 5
