= Aimable Bayingana =

Rwandan sports executive

- Born: 14 July 1970 (age 56); Gatsibo District, Rwanda
- Education: University of Lomé (Bachelor of Arts)
- Years active: 2007–present
- Known for: Tour du Rwanda Chairman
- Title: Former President FERWACY
- Predecessor: Kamanda Charles
- Successor: Murenzi Abdallah

Aimable Bayingana (born July 14, 1970) is a Rwandan sports executive.

Bayingana served as the president of Rwanda Cycling Federation (FERWACY) between 2007 and 2019. From October 2018 to December 2019, he chaired as the President of Union Francophone de Cyclisme, a cycling association that connects 33 countries.

== Early life ==
Bayingana was born on July 14, 1970, in Gatsibo, Eastern Province, Rwanda. He holds a bachelor of Arts from University of Lomé, Togo.

== Career ==
On December 5, 2007, in the event held at Amahoro Stadium, Bayingana was elected as the president of former Rwanda Racing Union, now FERWACY replacing Hon. Kamanda Charles who was the leader since 2002, he chaired this position until December 2019. From 2009 to December 2019, he was serving as the Chairman of Organizing Committee of Tour Du Rwanda.

From 2013 to 2019, Bayingana served as one of seven members of executive committee of the African Cycling Confederation, in this position he was nominated in 2013 to supervise the continental cycling championships that was hosted in Sharm El Sheikh, Egypt.

Bayingana was also the president of the Union Francophone de Cyclisme from October 2018 to December 2019. In this position he organized Kigali Union Cycliste Internationale Junior Race in May 2019, an international youth cycling competition held in Kigali organized by the Union Francophone de Cyclisme in collaboration with FERWACY and Association Internationale des maires Francophones.

== Achievements ==
In 2009, Bayingana helped to register Tour Du Rwanda in Union Cycliste Internationale in 2.2 racing category which was upgraded to 2.1 racing category since 2019.

Bayingana in his tenure, Rwanda organized the African Championships of road cycling for the first time in 2010, and for the second time in 2018. Rwanda also organized the African Championships of Mountain bike for the first time in 2015. In September 2019, Rwanda submitted official application to host 2025 World Championships of Cycling.

In 2018, Rwanda National cycling team and Areruya Joseph won the most ranked continental cycling competition Tropicale Amissa Bongo (Tour du Gabon), it was the first time for an African team. During his time in office, Rwandan cyclists won Tour du Rwanda five times, 2014, 2015, 2016, 2017, and 2018.

== Awards ==
On February 18, 2018, Bayingana received the Award of Merit from Dr Mohamed Wagih Azzam the president of the Confédération Africaine de Cyclisme for his tremendous work in developing cycling in Rwanda and Africa.
