= Rwanda Cycling Federation =

The Rwanda Cycling Federation or FERWACY (in French: Fédération Rwandaise de Cyclisme) is the national governing body of cycle racing in Rwanda. FERWACY is a member of the African Cycling Confederation and the Union Cycliste Internationale.

== Leadership ==
The current FERWACY president is Samson Ndayishimiye. He replaced Abdallah Murenzi, formerly a mayor of the Nyanza District, who was elected on 22 December 2019. Murenzi replaced Aimable Bayingana, who resigned earlier that month due to allegations of corruption and sexual abuse.

List of presidents:

- 2007 – 12/2019: Aimable Bayingana
- 2019 – 08/2023: Abdallah Murenzi (interim until 03/2022)
- since 11/2023: Samson Ndayishimiye

=== Organization ===
The FERWACY management committee consists of the president, two vice-presidents, a general secretary, a treasurer and three advisors, all of which are elected positions.

== Events and Programs ==
=== Professional ===
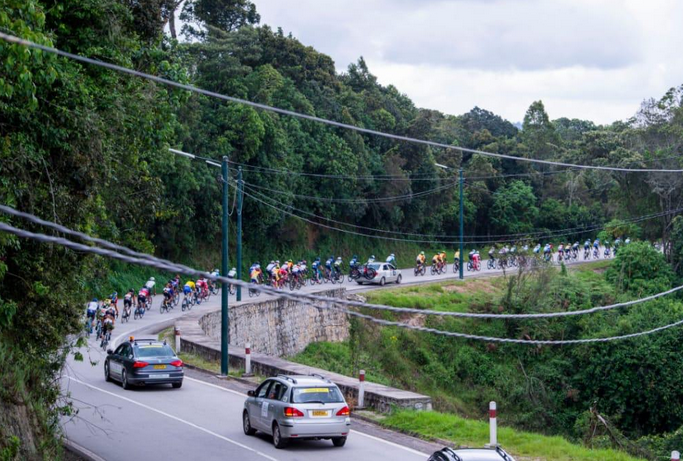
2020 Tour du Rwanda Stage 3

As the national governing body of cycling in Rwanda, the Rwanda Cycling Federation is in charge of hosting and organizing many professional cycling events around the country, with the biggest annual event being the Tour du Rwanda, which is a road cycling stage race that usually takes place in late February and draws out large crowds. It was first held in 1988, but it only became a professional event in 2009 when it was added to the UCI Africa Tour calendar as a category 2.1 event.

The Rwanda Cycling Federation has also hosted and organized the African Continental Road Cycling Championships in 2010 and 2018, as well as the African Continental Mountain Bike Championships in 2015.

In July 2018, UCI president David Lappartient, keen to grow the popularity of the sport of cycling in Africa, invited all 50 national federations that form the African Cycling Confederation to make bids to host the 2025 UCI Road World Championships. In September 2019, Rwanda and FERWACY submitted their official bid to host the event in Kigali, the capital and largest city. This bid was inspected by the UCI in May 2021 to determine if all the necessary requirements are met. At the 2021 UCI Road World Championships in late September, Rwanda was announced as the winning bid over Morocco, the only other major bid; as a result, Rwanda will become the first African country to host the championships.

The Rwanda Cycling Federation also manages the Rwandan national cycling team, which has often been invited to participate in UCI Africa Tour events like the Tour du Rwanda and La Tropicale Amissa Bongo, through the Africa Rising Cycling Center, which breeds both local talent and helps develop talent in other African countries.

=== Amateur and Local ===
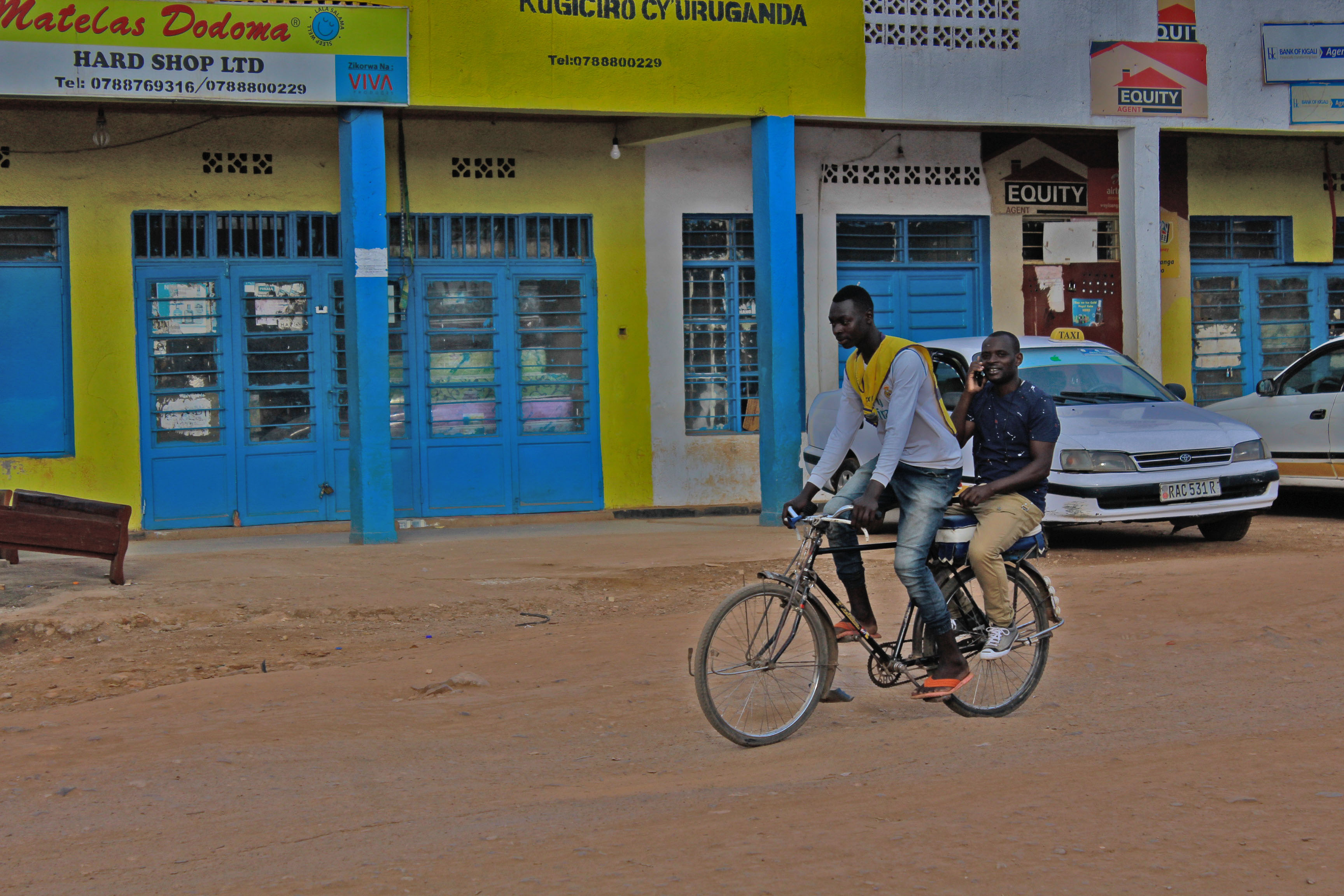
In rural areas of Rwanda, cycling is one of the most common means of transportation.

To help promote and encourage cycling in Rwanda, where cycling has experienced a notable growth in recent times, the Rwanda Cycling Federation also hosts and organizes many amateur races and events. One notable event is the Rwanda Cycling Cup, a series of races that also includes the Rwandan National Road Race and Time Trial Championships, which are both open to professionals and amateurs.

There has also been major investment into the cycling tourism industry. Ride Rwanda, the biggest of these touring events, is an annual multi-day bike touring event open to the public that is held at the same time as the Tour du Rwanda. It allows participants to ride on some of the same roads and climbs used in that year's Tour du Rwanda just hours before the professional race.

As part of the Kigali City Master Plan 2050 and revised District Development Strategies, the Rwanda Cycling Federation, in conjunction with the United Nations and other national government organizations, have launched several initiatives to promote cycling commuterism in order to reduce emissions, increase sustainability, and ensure a cleaner environment. These measures include the construction and improvement of pedestrian footpaths and bike paths, the launch of GuraRide, a public bike-sharing program, and the UN Environment Programme's Share the Road Initiative in partnership with the Global Green Growth Institute.
