= List of teams and cyclists in the 2023 Giro d'Italia =

List of cyclists

The following is a list of teams and cyclists who participated in the 2023 Giro d'Italia.

== Teams ==
UCI WorldTeams

- AG2R Citroën Team
- Alpecin–Deceuninck
- Astana Qazaqstan Team
- Arkéa–Samsic
- Bora–Hansgrohe
- Cofidis
- EF Education–EasyPost
- Groupama–FDJ
- Ineos Grenadiers
- Intermarché–Circus–Wanty
- Movistar Team
- Soudal–Quick-Step
- Team Bahrain Victorious
- Team DSM
- Team Jayco–AlUla
- Team Jumbo–Visma
- Trek–Segafredo
- UAE Team Emirates

UCI ProTeams

- Eolo–Kometa
- Green Project–Bardiani–CSF–Faizanè
- Israel–Premier Tech
- Team Corratec–Selle Italia

== Cyclists ==
Legend
No.	Starting number worn by the rider during the Giro
Pos.	Position in the general classification
Time	Deficit to the winner of the general classification
†	Denotes riders born on or after 1 January 1998 eligible for the young rider classification
General classification	Denotes the winner of the general classification
Points classification	Denotes the winner of the points classification
Mountains classification	Denotes the winner of the mountains classification
Young rider classification	Denotes the winner of the young rider classification (eligibility indicated by †)
Combativity award	Denotes the winner of the combativity award
DNS	Denotes a rider who did not start a stage, followed by the stage before which he withdrew
DNF	Denotes a rider who did not finish a stage, followed by the stage in which he withdrew
DSQ	Denotes a rider who was disqualified from the race, followed by the stage in which this occurred
HD	Denotes a rider finished outside the time limit, followed by the stage in which they did so
Ages correct as of Saturday 6 May 2023, the date on which the Giro began

=== By starting number ===
No.	Name	Nationality	Team	Age	Pos.	Time	Ref.
1	Remco Evenepoel †	Belgium	Soudal–Quick-Step	23	DNS-10	–	
2	Davide Ballerini	Italy	Soudal–Quick-Step	28	DNS-16	–	
3	Mattia Cattaneo	Italy	Soudal–Quick-Step	32	DNS-11	–	
4	Josef Černý	Czechia	Soudal–Quick-Step	29	DNS-11	–	
5	Jan Hirt	Czechia	Soudal–Quick-Step	32	DNS-11	–	
6	Pieter Serry	Belgium	Soudal–Quick-Step	34	60	+ 2h 36' 54"	
7	Ilan Van Wilder †	Belgium	Soudal–Quick-Step	22	12	+ 11' 58"	
8	Louis Vervaeke	Belgium	Soudal–Quick-Step	29	DNS-11	–	
11	Aurélien Paret-Peintre	France	AG2R Citroën Team	27	15	+ 14' 13"	
12	Alex Baudin †	France	AG2R Citroën Team	21	73	+ 3h 17' 15"	
13	Mikaël Cherel	France	AG2R Citroën Team	37	DNF-12	–	
14	Paul Lapeira †	France	AG2R Citroën Team	22	DNF-4	–	
15	Valentin Paret-Peintre †	France	AG2R Citroën Team	22	37	+ 1h 31' 52"	
16	Nicolas Prodhomme	France	AG2R Citroën Team	26	23	+ 46' 26"	
17	Andrea Vendrame	Italy	AG2R Citroën Team	28	DNS-11	–	
18	Larry Warbasse	United States	AG2R Citroën Team	32	44	+ 1h 49' 54"	
21	Stefano Oldani †	Italy	Alpecin–Deceuninck	25	45	+ 1h 57' 09"	
22	Nicola Conci	Italy	Alpecin–Deceuninck	26	DNS-7	–	
23	Kaden Groves †	Australia	Alpecin–Deceuninck	24	DNF-12	–	
24	Alexander Krieger	Germany	Alpecin–Deceuninck	31	121	+ 5h 08' 46"	
25	Senne Leysen	Belgium	Alpecin–Deceuninck	27	91	+ 3h 58' 37"	
26	Oscar Riesebeek	Netherlands	Alpecin–Deceuninck	30	DNS-10	–	
27	Kristian Sbaragli	Italy	Alpecin–Deceuninck	32	85	+ 3h 45' 29"	
28	Ramon Sinkeldam	Netherlands	Alpecin–Deceuninck	34	DNS-5	–	
31	Mark Cavendish	Great Britain	Astana Qazaqstan Team	37	120	+ 5h 07' 08"	
32	Samuele Battistella †	Italy	Astana Qazaqstan Team	24	DNS-14	–	
33	Joe Dombrowski	United States	Astana Qazaqstan Team	31	59	+ 2h 36' 33"	
34	Gianni Moscon	Italy	Astana Qazaqstan Team	29	107	+ 4h 48' 59"	
35	Vadim Pronskiy †	Kazakhstan	Astana Qazaqstan Team	24	43	+ 1h 48' 31"	
36	Luis León Sánchez	Spain	Astana Qazaqstan Team	39	24	+ 48' 03"	
37	Christian Scaroni	Italy	Astana Qazaqstan Team	25	58	+ 2h 35' 12"	
38	Simone Velasco	Italy	Astana Qazaqstan Team	27	26	+ 51' 15"	
41	Jack Haig	Australia	Team Bahrain Victorious	29	19	+ 34' 46"	
42	Yukiya Arashiro	Japan	Team Bahrain Victorious	38	123	+ 5h 21' 17"	
43	Santiago Buitrago †	Colombia	Team Bahrain Victorious	23	13	+ 12' 21"	
44	Damiano Caruso	Italy	Team Bahrain Victorious	35	4	+ 4' 40"	
45	Jonathan Milan †	Italy	Team Bahrain Victorious	22	103	+ 4h 29' 02"	
46	Andrea Pasqualon	Italy	Team Bahrain Victorious	35	65	+ 2h 58' 04"	
47	Jasha Sütterlin	Germany	Team Bahrain Victorious	30	75	+ 3h 20' 13"	
48	Edoardo Zambanini †	Italy	Team Bahrain Victorious	22	40	+ 1h 38' 28"	
51	Aleksandr Vlasov		Bora–Hansgrohe	27	DNF-10	–	
52	Giovanni Aleotti †	Italy	Bora–Hansgrohe	23	DNS-7	–	
53	Cesare Benedetti	Poland	Bora–Hansgrohe	35	102	+ 4h 28' 46"	
54	Nico Denz	Germany	Bora–Hansgrohe	29	57	+ 2h 23' 39"	
55	Bob Jungels	Luxembourg	Bora–Hansgrohe	30	39	+ 1h 37' 57"	
56	Lennard Kämna	Germany	Bora–Hansgrohe	26	9	+ 7' 46"	
57	Patrick Konrad	Austria	Bora–Hansgrohe	31	20	+ 37' 57"	
58	Anton Palzer	Germany	Bora–Hansgrohe	30	51	+ 2h 08' 46"	
61	Simone Consonni	Italy	Cofidis	28	111	+ 4h 56' 49"	
62	François Bidard	France	Cofidis	31	54	+ 2h 15' 00"	
63	Thomas Champion †	France	Cofidis	23	66	+ 2h 58' 14"	
64	Davide Cimolai	Italy	Cofidis	33	DNS-9	–	
65	Alexandre Delettre †	France	Cofidis	25	89	+ 3h 55' 28"	
66	Jonathan Lastra	Spain	Cofidis	29	35	+ 1h 29' 02"	
67	Rémy Rochas	France	Cofidis	26	DNS-5	–	
68	Hugo Toumire †	France	Cofidis	21	83	+ 3h 39' 50"	
71	Rigoberto Urán	Colombia	EF Education–EasyPost	36	DNS-10	–	
72	Jonathan Kléver Caicedo	Ecuador	EF Education–EasyPost	30	DNS-11	–	
73	Hugh Carthy	Great Britain	EF Education–EasyPost	28	DNS-19	–	
74	Jefferson Alexander Cepeda †	Ecuador	EF Education–EasyPost	24	53	+ 2h 12' 16"	
75	Stefan De Bod	South Africa	EF Education–EasyPost	26	DNS-14	–	
76	Ben Healy †	Ireland	EF Education–EasyPost	22	55	+ 2h 18' 04"	
77	Alberto Bettiol	Italy	EF Education–EasyPost	29	48	+ 2h 05' 06"	
78	Magnus Cort	Denmark	EF Education–EasyPost	30	62	+ 2h 44' 33"	
81	Vincenzo Albanese	Italy	Eolo–Kometa	26	70	+ 3h 10' 05"	
82	Davide Bais †	Italy	Eolo–Kometa	25	81	+ 3h 33' 50"	
83	Mattia Bais	Italy	Eolo–Kometa	26	47	+ 2h 04' 10"	
84	Erik Fetter †	Hungary	Eolo–Kometa	23	DNF-10	–	
85	Lorenzo Fortunato	Italy	Eolo–Kometa	26	21	+ 38' 37"	
86	Francesco Gavazzi	Italy	Eolo–Kometa	38	67	+ 3h 00' 02"	
87	Mirco Maestri	Italy	Eolo–Kometa	31	78	+ 3h 29' 16"	
88	Diego Pablo Sevilla	Spain	Eolo–Kometa	27	97	+ 4h 11' 51"	
91	Filippo Fiorelli	Italy	Green Project–Bardiani–CSF–Faizanè	28	114	+ 5h 00' 34"	
92	Luca Covili	Italy	Green Project–Bardiani–CSF–Faizanè	26	DNS-18	–	
93	Davide Gabburo	Italy	Green Project–Bardiani–CSF–Faizanè	30	64	+ 2h 56' 29"	
94	Filippo Magli †	Italy	Green Project–Bardiani–CSF–Faizanè	24	106	+ 4h 46' 15"	
95	Martin Marcellusi †	Italy	Green Project–Bardiani–CSF–Faizanè	23	99	+ 4h 25' 38"	
96	Henok Mulubrhan †	Eritrea	Green Project–Bardiani–CSF–Faizanè	23	87	+ 3h 52' 20"	
97	Alessandro Tonelli	Italy	Green Project–Bardiani–CSF–Faizanè	30	42	+ 1h 41' 48"	
98	Samuele Zoccarato †	Italy	Green Project–Bardiani–CSF–Faizanè	25	DNF-8	–	
101	Thibaut Pinot	France	Groupama–FDJ	32	5	+ 5' 43"	
102	Bruno Armirail	France	Groupama–FDJ	29	16	+ 17' 16"	
103	Ignatas Konovalovas	Lithuania	Groupama–FDJ	37	105	+ 4h 43' 42"	
104	Stefan Küng	Switzerland	Groupama–FDJ	29	DNS-10	–	
105	Fabian Lienhard	Switzerland	Groupama–FDJ	29	113	+ 4h 59' 21"	
106	Rudy Molard	France	Groupama–FDJ	33	69	+ 3h 07' 44"	
107	Jake Stewart †	Great Britain	Groupama–FDJ	23	92	+ 3h 59' 18"	
109	Lars van den Berg †	Netherlands	Groupama–FDJ	24	DNS-8	–	
111	Tao Geoghegan Hart	Great Britain	Ineos Grenadiers	28	DNF-11	–	
112	Thymen Arensman †	Netherlands	Ineos Grenadiers	23	6	+ 6' 05"	
113	Laurens De Plus	Belgium	Ineos Grenadiers	27	10	+ 9' 08"	
114	Filippo Ganna	Italy	Ineos Grenadiers	26	DNS-8	–	
115	Salvatore Puccio	Italy	Ineos Grenadiers	33	72	+ 3h 12' 08"	
116	Pavel Sivakov	France	Ineos Grenadiers	25	DNF-16	–	
117	Ben Swift	Great Britain	Ineos Grenadiers	35	61	+ 2h 44' 27"	
118	Geraint Thomas	Great Britain	Ineos Grenadiers	36	2	+ 14"	
121	Lorenzo Rota	Italy	Intermarché–Circus–Wanty	27	46	+ 1h 57' 55"	
122	Niccolò Bonifazio	Italy	Intermarché–Circus–Wanty	29	DNS-18	–	
123	Sven Erik Bystrøm	Norway	Intermarché–Circus–Wanty	31	DNS-10	–	
124	Laurens Huys †	Belgium	Intermarché–Circus–Wanty	24	27	+ 52' 18"	
125	Arne Marit †	Belgium	Intermarché–Circus–Wanty	24	112	+ 4h 58' 01"	
126	Simone Petilli	Italy	Intermarché–Circus–Wanty	30	DNF-10	–	
127	Laurenz Rex †	Belgium	Intermarché–Circus–Wanty	23	88	+ 3h 54' 23"	
128	Rein Taaramäe	Estonia	Intermarché–Circus–Wanty	36	DNS-10	–	
131	Domenico Pozzovivo	Italy	Israel–Premier Tech	40	DNS-10	–	
132	Sebastian Berwick †	Australia	Israel–Premier Tech	23	71	+ 3h 11' 47"	
133	Simon Clarke	Australia	Israel–Premier Tech	36	DNS-16	–	
134	Marco Frigo †	Italy	Israel–Premier Tech	23	32	+ 1h 24' 36"	
135	Derek Gee	Canada	Israel–Premier Tech	25	22	+ 40' 54"	
136	Matthew Riccitello †	United States	Israel–Premier Tech	21	56	+ 2h 22' 57"	
137	Mads Würtz Schmidt	Denmark	Israel–Premier Tech	29	DNS-10	–	
138	Stephen Williams	Great Britain	Israel–Premier Tech	26	93	+ 3h 59' 55"	
141	Primož Roglič	Slovenia	Team Jumbo–Visma	33	1	85h 29' 02"	
142	Edoardo Affini	Italy	Team Jumbo–Visma	26	94	+ 4h 02' 55"	
143	Koen Bouwman	Netherlands	Team Jumbo–Visma	29	25	+ 48' 15"	
144	Rohan Dennis	Australia	Team Jumbo–Visma	32	41	+ 1h 38' 35"	
145	Michel Hessmann †	Germany	Team Jumbo–Visma	22	33	+ 1h 26' 24"	
146	Sepp Kuss	United States	Team Jumbo–Visma	28	14	+ 13' 09"	
147	Thomas Gloag †	Great Britain	Team Jumbo–Visma	21	76	+ 3h 22' 19"	
148	Sam Oomen	Netherlands	Team Jumbo–Visma	27	36	+ 1h 30' 51"	
151	Fernando Gaviria	Colombia	Movistar Team	28	118	+ 5h 04' 38"	
152	Will Barta	United States	Movistar Team	27	52	+ 2h 10' 12"	
153	Max Kanter	Germany	Movistar Team	25	110	+ 4h 52' 47"	
154	Óscar Rodríguez	Spain	Movistar Team	28	DNF-11	–	
155	José Joaquín Rojas	Spain	Movistar Team	37	79	+ 3h 32' 20"	
156	Einer Rubio †	Colombia	Movistar Team	25	11	+ 10' 43"	
157	Albert Torres	Spain	Movistar Team	33	122	+ 5h 19' 29"	
158	Carlos Verona	Spain	Movistar Team	30	49	+ 2h 06' 24"	
161	Warren Barguil	France	Arkéa–Samsic	31	17	+ 24' 06"	
162	Maxime Bouet	France	Arkéa–Samsic	36	80	+ 3h 32' 23"	
163	David Dekker †	Netherlands	Arkéa–Samsic	24	DNF-8	–	
164	Thibault Guernalec	France	Arkéa–Samsic	25	90	+ 3h 56' 10"	
165	Michel Ries †	Luxembourg	Arkéa–Samsic	25	86	+ 3h 46' 43"	
166	Alan Riou	France	Arkéa–Samsic	26	116	+ 5h 02' 06"	
167	Clément Russo	France	Arkéa–Samsic	28	DNS-6	–	
168	Alessandro Verre †	Italy	Arkéa–Samsic	21	DNF-14	–	
171	Valerio Conti	Italy	Team Corratec–Selle Italia	30	DNS-5	–	
172	Nicolas Dalla Valle	Italy	Team Corratec–Selle Italia	25	125	+ 5h 26' 45"	
173	Stefano Gandin	Italy	Team Corratec–Selle Italia	27	DNS-11	–	
174	Alessandro Iacchi †	Italy	Team Corratec–Selle Italia	23	119	+ 5h 06' 23"	
175	Alexander Konychev †	Italy	Team Corratec–Selle Italia	24	100	+ 4h 26' 35"	
176	Charlie Quarterman †	Great Britain	Team Corratec–Selle Italia	24	115	+ 5h 01' 27"	
177	Veljko Stojnić †	Serbia	Team Corratec–Selle Italia	24	101	+ 4h 26' 52"	
178	Karel Vacek †	Czechia	Team Corratec–Selle Italia	22	84	+ 3h 43' 50"	
181	Andreas Leknessund †	Norway	Team DSM	23	8	+ 7' 31"	
182	Alberto Dainese †	Italy	Team DSM	25	124	+ 5h 23' 48"	
183	Jonas Iversby Hvideberg †	Norway	Team DSM	24	117	+ 5h 02' 12"	
184	Niklas Märkl †	Germany	Team DSM	24	104	+ 4h 30' 49"	
185	Marius Mayrhofer †	Germany	Team DSM	22	74	+ 3h 17' 27"	
186	Florian Stork	Germany	Team DSM	26	DNF-8	–	
187	Martijn Tusveld	Netherlands	Team DSM	30	DNF-10	–	
188	Harm Vanhoucke	Belgium	Team DSM	25	DNF-12	–	
191	Michael Matthews	Australia	Team Jayco–AlUla	32	63	+ 2h 45' 46"	
192	Alessandro De Marchi	Italy	Team Jayco–AlUla	36	38	+ 1h 37' 50"	
193	Eddie Dunbar	Ireland	Team Jayco–AlUla	26	7	+ 7' 30"	
194	Michael Hepburn	Australia	Team Jayco–AlUla	31	77	+ 3h 25' 50"	
195	Lukas Pöstlberger	Austria	Team Jayco–AlUla	31	95	+ 4h 06' 05"	
196	Callum Scotson	Australia	Team Jayco–AlUla	26	DNS-10	–	
197	Campbell Stewart †	New Zealand	Team Jayco–AlUla	24	108	+ 4h 51' 15"	
198	Filippo Zana †	Italy	Team Jayco–AlUla	24	18	+ 33' 22"	
201	Mads Pedersen	Denmark	Trek–Segafredo	27	DNS-13	–	
202	Amanuel Ghebreigzabhier	Eritrea	Trek–Segafredo	28	DNS-16	–	
203	Daan Hoole †	Netherlands	Trek–Segafredo	24	109	+ 4h 52' 37"	
204	Alex Kirsch	Luxembourg	Trek–Segafredo	30	96	+ 4h 11' 01"	
205	Bauke Mollema	Netherlands	Trek–Segafredo	36	50	+ 2h 08' 44"	
206	Toms Skujiņš	Latvia	Trek–Segafredo	31	31	+ 1h 10' 21"	
207	Natnael Tesfatsion †	Eritrea	Trek–Segafredo	23	DNS-11	–	
208	Otto Vergaerde	Belgium	Trek–Segafredo	28	98	+ 4h 24' 51"	
211	João Almeida †	Portugal	UAE Team Emirates	24	3	+ 1' 15"	
212	Pascal Ackermann	Germany	UAE Team Emirates	29	82	+ 3h 38' 18"	
213	Alessandro Covi †	Italy	UAE Team Emirates	24	DNS-12	–	
214	Davide Formolo	Italy	UAE Team Emirates	30	30	+ 1h 08' 58"	
215	Ryan Gibbons	South Africa	UAE Team Emirates	28	68	+ 3h 01' 25"	
216	Brandon McNulty †	United States	UAE Team Emirates	25	29	+ 1h 07' 43"	
217	Diego Ulissi	Italy	UAE Team Emirates	33	28	+ 1h 02' 50"	
218	Jay Vine	Australia	UAE Team Emirates	27	34	+ 1h 28' 59"	

=== By team ===
(Belgium) Soudal–Quick-Step (SOQ)
No.	Rider	Pos.
1	Remco Evenepoel (BEL)	DNS-10
2	Davide Ballerini (ITA)	DNS-16
3	Mattia Cattaneo (ITA)	DNS-11
4	Josef Černý (CZE)	DNS-11
5	Jan Hirt (CZE)	DNS-11
6	Pieter Serry (BEL)	60
7	Ilan Van Wilder (BEL)	12
8	Louis Vervaeke (BEL)	DNS-11

(France) AG2R Citroën Team (ACT)
No.	Rider	Pos.
11	Aurélien Paret-Peintre (FRA)	15
12	Alex Baudin (FRA)	73
13	Mikaël Cherel (FRA)	DNF-12
14	Paul Lapeira (FRA)	DNF-4
15	Valentin Paret-Peintre (FRA)	37
16	Nicolas Prodhomme (FRA)	23
17	Andrea Vendrame (ITA)	DNS-11
18	Larry Warbasse (USA)	44

(Belgium) Alpecin–Deceuninck (ADC)
No.	Rider	Pos.
21	Stefano Oldani (ITA)	45
22	Nicola Conci (ITA)	DNS-7
23	Kaden Groves (AUS)	DNF-12
24	Alexander Krieger (GER)	121
25	Senne Leysen (BEL)	91
26	Oscar Riesebeek (NED)	DNS-10
27	Kristian Sbaragli (ITA)	85
28	Ramon Sinkeldam (NED)	DNS-5

(Kazakhstan) Astana Qazaqstan Team (AST)
No.	Rider	Pos.
31	Mark Cavendish (GBR)	120
32	Samuele Battistella (ITA)	DNS-14
33	Joe Dombrowski (USA)	59
34	Gianni Moscon (ITA)	107
35	Vadim Pronskiy (KAZ)	43
36	Luis León Sánchez (ESP)	24
37	Christian Scaroni (ITA)	58
38	Simone Velasco (ITA)	26

Team Bahrain Victorious (TBV)
No.	Rider	Pos.
41	Jack Haig (AUS)	19
42	Yukiya Arashiro (JPN)	123
43	Santiago Buitrago (COL)	13
44	Damiano Caruso (ITA)	4
45	Jonathan Milan (ITA)	103
46	Andrea Pasqualon (ITA)	65
47	Jasha Sütterlin (GER)	75
48	Edoardo Zambanini (ITA)	40

(Germany) Bora–Hansgrohe (BOH)
No.	Rider	Pos.
51	Aleksandr Vlasov	DNF-10
52	Giovanni Aleotti (ITA)	DNS-7
53	Cesare Benedetti (POL)	102
54	Nico Denz (GER)	57
55	Bob Jungels (LUX)	39
56	Lennard Kämna (GER)	9
57	Patrick Konrad (AUT)	20
58	Anton Palzer (GER)	51

(France) Cofidis (COF)
No.	Rider	Pos.
61	Simone Consonni (ITA)	111
62	François Bidard (FRA)	54
63	Thomas Champion (FRA)	66
64	Davide Cimolai (ITA)	DNS-9
65	Alexandre Delettre (FRA)	89
66	Jonathan Lastra (ESP)	35
67	Rémy Rochas (FRA)	DNS-5
68	Hugo Toumire (FRA)	83

(United States) EF Education–EasyPost (EFE)
No.	Rider	Pos.
71	Rigoberto Urán (COL)	DNS-10
72	Jonathan Kléver Caicedo (ECU)	DNS-11
73	Hugh Carthy (GBR)	DNS-19
74	Jefferson Alexander Cepeda (ECU)	53
75	Stefan De Bod (RSA)	DNS-14
76	Ben Healy (IRL)	55
77	Alberto Bettiol (ITA)	48
78	Magnus Cort (DEN)	62

(Italy) Eolo–Kometa (EOK)
No.	Rider	Pos.
81	Vincenzo Albanese (ITA)	70
82	Davide Bais (ITA)	81
83	Mattia Bais (ITA)	47
84	Erik Fetter (HUN)	DNF-10
85	Lorenzo Fortunato (ITA)	21
86	Francesco Gavazzi (ITA)	67
87	Mirco Maestri (ITA)	78
88	Diego Pablo Sevilla (ESP)	97

(Italy) Green Project–Bardiani–CSF–Faizanè (GBF)
No.	Rider	Pos.
91	Filippo Fiorelli (ITA)	114
92	Luca Covili (ITA)	DNS-18
93	Davide Gabburo (ITA)	64
94	Filippo Magli (ITA)	106
95	Martin Marcellusi (ITA)	99
96	Henok Mulubrhan (ERI)	87
97	Alessandro Tonelli (ITA)	42
98	Samuele Zoccarato (ITA)	DNF-8

(France) Groupama–FDJ (GFC)
No.	Rider	Pos.
101	Thibaut Pinot (FRA)	5
102	Bruno Armirail (FRA)	16
103	Ignatas Konovalovas (LTU)	105
104	Stefan Küng (SUI)	DNS-10
105	Fabian Lienhard (SUI)	113
106	Rudy Molard (FRA)	69
107	Jake Stewart (GBR)	92
109	Lars van den Berg (NED)	DNS-8

(United Kingdom) Ineos Grenadiers (IGD)
No.	Rider	Pos.
111	Tao Geoghegan Hart (GBR)	DNF-11
112	Thymen Arensman (NED)	6
113	Laurens De Plus (BEL)	10
114	Filippo Ganna (ITA)	DNS-8
115	Salvatore Puccio (ITA)	72
116	Pavel Sivakov (FRA)	DNF-16
117	Ben Swift (GBR)	61
118	Geraint Thomas (GBR)	2

(Belgium) Intermarché–Circus–Wanty (ICW)
No.	Rider	Pos.
121	Lorenzo Rota (ITA)	46
122	Niccolò Bonifazio (ITA)	DNS-18
123	Sven Erik Bystrøm (NOR)	DNS-10
124	Laurens Huys (BEL)	27
125	Arne Marit (BEL)	112
126	Simone Petilli (ITA)	DNF-10
127	Laurenz Rex (BEL)	88
128	Rein Taaramäe (EST)	DNS-10

Israel–Premier Tech (IPT)
No.	Rider	Pos.
131	Domenico Pozzovivo (ITA)	DNS-10
132	Sebastian Berwick (AUS)	71
133	Simon Clarke (AUS)	DNS-16
134	Marco Frigo (ITA)	32
135	Derek Gee (CAN)	22
136	Matthew Riccitello (USA)	56
137	Mads Würtz Schmidt (DEN)	DNS-10
138	Stephen Williams (GBR)	93

(Netherlands) Team Jumbo–Visma (TJV)
No.	Rider	Pos.
141	Primož Roglič (SLO)	1
142	Edoardo Affini (ITA)	94
143	Koen Bouwman (NED)	25
144	Rohan Dennis (AUS)	41
145	Michel Hessmann (GER)	33
146	Sepp Kuss (USA)	14
147	Thomas Gloag (GBR)	76
148	Sam Oomen (NED)	36

(Spain) Movistar Team (MOV)
No.	Rider	Pos.
151	Fernando Gaviria (COL)	118
152	Will Barta (USA)	52
153	Max Kanter (GER)	110
154	Óscar Rodríguez (ESP)	DNF-11
155	José Joaquín Rojas (ESP)	79
156	Einer Rubio (COL)	11
157	Albert Torres (ESP)	122
158	Carlos Verona (ESP)	49

(France) Arkéa–Samsic (ARK)
No.	Rider	Pos.
161	Warren Barguil (FRA)	17
162	Maxime Bouet (FRA)	80
163	David Dekker (NED)	DNF-8
164	Thibault Guernalec (FRA)	90
165	Michel Ries (LUX)	86
166	Alan Riou (FRA)	116
167	Clément Russo (FRA)	DNS-6
168	Alessandro Verre (ITA)	DNF-14

(Italy) Team Corratec–Selle Italia (COR)
No.	Rider	Pos.
171	Valerio Conti (ITA)	DNS-5
172	Nicolas Dalla Valle (ITA)	125
173	Stefano Gandin (ITA)	DNS-11
174	Alessandro Iacchi (ITA)	119
175	Alexander Konychev (ITA)	100
176	Charlie Quarterman (GBR)	115
177	Veljko Stojnić (SRB)	101
178	Karel Vacek (CZE)	84

(Netherlands) Team DSM (DSM)
No.	Rider	Pos.
181	Andreas Leknessund (NOR)	8
182	Alberto Dainese (ITA)	124
183	Jonas Iversby Hvideberg (NOR)	117
184	Niklas Märkl (GER)	104
185	Marius Mayrhofer (GER)	74
186	Florian Stork (GER)	DNF-8
187	Martijn Tusveld (NED)	DNF-10
188	Harm Vanhoucke (BEL)	DNF-12

(Australia) Team Jayco–AlUla (JAY)
No.	Rider	Pos.
191	Michael Matthews (AUS)	63
192	Alessandro De Marchi (ITA)	38
193	Eddie Dunbar (IRL)	7
194	Michael Hepburn (AUS)	77
195	Lukas Pöstlberger (AUT)	95
196	Callum Scotson (AUS)	DNS-10
197	Campbell Stewart (NZL)	108
198	Filippo Zana (ITA)	18

(United States) Trek–Segafredo (TFS)
No.	Rider	Pos.
201	Mads Pedersen (DEN)	DNS-13
202	Amanuel Ghebreigzabhier (ERI)	DNF-16
203	Daan Hoole (NED)	109
204	Alex Kirsch (LUX)	96
205	Bauke Mollema (NED)	50
206	Toms Skujiņš (LAT)	31
207	Natnael Tesfatsion (ERI)	DNS-11
208	Otto Vergaerde (BEL)	98

(United Arab Emirates) UAE Team Emirates (UAD)
No.	Rider	Pos.
211	João Almeida (POR)	3
212	Pascal Ackermann (GER)	82
213	Alessandro Covi (ITA)	DNS-12
214	Davide Formolo (ITA)	30
215	Ryan Gibbons (RSA)	68
216	Brandon McNulty (USA)	29
217	Diego Ulissi (ITA)	28
218	Jay Vine (AUS)	34

=== By nationality ===
Country	No. of riders	Finished	Stage wins
Australia	9	6	2 (Kaden Groves, Michael Matthews)
Austria	2	2	
Belgium	11	8	2 (Remco Evenepoel x2)
Canada	1	1	
Colombia	4	3	2 (Santiago Buitrago, Einer Rubio)
Czechia	3	1	
Denmark	3	1	2 (Magnus Cort, Mads Pedersen)
Ecuador	2	1	
Estonia	1	0	
Eritrea	3	1	
France	20	15	1 (Aurélien Paret-Peintre)
Germany	11	10	3 (Pascal Ackermann, Nico Denz x2)
Great Britain	9	7	1 (Mark Cavendish)
Hungary	1	0	
Ireland	2	2	1 (Ben Healy)
Italy	51	34	4 (Davide Bais, Alberto Dainese, Jonathan Milan, Filippo Zana)
Japan	1	1	
Kazakhstan	1	1	
Latvia	1	1	
Lithuania	1	1	
Luxembourg	3	3	
Netherlands	10	5	
New Zealand	1	1	
Norway	3	2	
Poland	1	1	
Portugal	1	1	1 (João Almeida)
Serbia	1	1	
Slovenia	1	1	1 (Primož Roglič)
South Africa	2	1	
Spain	7	6	
Switzerland	2	1	
United States	6	6	1 (Brandon McNulty)
	1	0	
Total	176	125	21
