= 2023 Giro d'Italia, Stage 12 to Stage 21 =

Cycling results

The 2023 Giro d'Italia was the 106th edition of the Giro d'Italia, one of cycling's Grand Tours. The Giro began in Fossacesia on 6 May, and Stage 12 occurred on 18 May with a stage to Rivoli. The race finished in Rome on 28 May.

== Classification standings ==
Legend
A pink jersey.	Denotes the leader of the general classification	A blue jersey.	Denotes the leader of the mountains classification
A violet jersey.	Denotes the leader of the points classification	A white jersey.	Denotes the leader of the young rider classification
A white jersey with a red number bib.	Denotes the winner of the combativity award		

== Stage 12 ==
18 May 2023 — Bra to Rivoli, 185 km (115 mi)

Stage 12 Result
Rank	Rider	Team	Time
1	Nico Denz (GER)	Bora–Hansgrohe	4h 18' 11"
2	Toms Skujiņš (LAT)	Trek–Segafredo	+ 0"
3	Sebastian Berwick (AUS)	Israel–Premier Tech	+ 3"
4	Alessandro Tonelli (ITA)	Green Project–Bardiani–CSF–Faizanè	+ 58"
5	Marco Frigo (ITA)	Israel–Premier Tech	+ 2' 07"
6	Ilan Van Wilder (BEL)	Soudal–Quick-Step	+ 2' 20"
7	Alberto Bettiol (ITA)	EF Education–EasyPost	+ 2' 20"
8	Cristian Scaroni (ITA)	Astana Qazaqstan Team	+ 2' 20"
9	Michel Hessmann (GER)	Team Jumbo–Visma	+ 2' 20"
10	Alex Baudin (FRA)	AG2R Citroën Team	+ 2' 20"

General classification after Stage 12
Rank	Rider	Team	Time
1	Geraint Thomas (GBR)	INEOS Grenadiers	49h 02' 05"
2	Primož Roglič (SLO)	Team Jumbo–Visma	+ 2"
3	João Almeida (POR)	UAE Team Emirates	+ 22"
4	Andreas Leknessund (NOR)	Team DSM	+ 35"
5	Damiano Caruso (ITA)	Team Bahrain Victorious	+ 1' 28"
6	Lennard Kämna (GER)	Bora–Hansgrohe	+ 1' 52"
7	Eddie Dunbar (IRL)	Team Jayco–AlUla	+ 2' 32"
8	Thymen Arensman (NED)	INEOS Grenadiers	+ 2' 32"
9	Laurens De Plus (BEL)	INEOS Grenadiers	+ 2' 36"
10	Aurélien Paret-Peintre (FRA)	AG2R Citroën Team	+ 2' 48"

== Stage 13 ==
19 May 2023 — ~~Borgofranco d’Ivrea~~ Le Châble (Switzerland) to Crans-Montana (Switzerland) (Note: Distance originally was 207 km, then it was rerouted to 199 km. Before the start of the stage, the distance was shortened to 74.6 km due to bad weather conditions.), 74.6 km (46.4 mi)

Stage 13 Result
Rank	Rider	Team	Time
1	Einer Rubio (COL)	Movistar Team	2h 16' 21"
2	Thibaut Pinot (FRA)	Groupama–FDJ	+ 6"
3	Jefferson Alexander Cepeda (ECU)	EF Education–EasyPost	+ 12"
4	Derek Gee (CAN)	Israel–Premier Tech	+ 1' 01"
5	Valentin Paret-Peintre (FRA)	AG2R Citroën Team	+ 1' 29"
6	Hugh Carthy (GBR)	EF Education–EasyPost	+ 1' 29"
7	João Almeida (POR)	UAE Team Emirates	+ 1' 35"
8	Eddie Dunbar (IRL)	Team Jayco–AlUla	+ 1' 35"
9	Geraint Thomas (GBR)	INEOS Grenadiers	+ 1' 35"
10	Primož Roglič (SLO)	Team Jumbo–Visma	+ 1' 35"

General classification after Stage 13
Rank	Rider	Team	Time
1	Geraint Thomas (GBR)	INEOS Grenadiers	51h 20' 01"
2	Primož Roglič (SLO)	Team Jumbo–Visma	+ 2"
3	João Almeida (POR)	UAE Team Emirates	+ 22"
4	Andreas Leknessund (NOR)	Team DSM	+ 42"
5	Damiano Caruso (ITA)	Team Bahrain Victorious	+ 1' 28"
6	Lennard Kämna (GER)	Bora–Hansgrohe	+ 1' 52"
7	Eddie Dunbar (IRL)	Team Jayco–AlUla	+ 2' 32"
8	Thymen Arensman (NED)	INEOS Grenadiers	+ 2' 45"
9	Laurens De Plus (BEL)	INEOS Grenadiers	+ 3' 08"
10	Thibaut Pinot (FRA)	Groupama–FDJ	+ 3' 13"

== Stage 14 ==
20 May 2023 — Sierre (Switzerland) to Cassano Magnago, 194 km (121 mi)

Stage 14 Result
Rank	Rider	Team	Time
1	Nico Denz (GER)	Bora–Hansgrohe	4h 37' 30"
2	Derek Gee (CAN)	Israel–Premier Tech	+ 0"
3	Alberto Bettiol (ITA)	EF Education–EasyPost	+ 0"
4	Laurenz Rex (BEL)	Intermarché–Circus–Wanty	+ 1"
5	Davide Ballerini (ITA)	Soudal–Quick-Step	+ 1"
6	Toms Skujiņš (LAT)	Trek–Segafredo	+ 4"
7	Marius Mayrhofer (GER)	Team DSM	+ 10"
8	Stefano Oldani (ITA)	Alpecin–Deceuninck	+ 20"
9	Andrea Pasqualon (ITA)	Team Bahrain Victorious	+ 50"
10	Mirco Maestri (ITA)	Eolo–Kometa	+ 50"

General classification after Stage 14
Rank	Rider	Team	Time
1	Bruno Armirail (FRA)	Groupama–FDJ	56h 17' 01"
2	Geraint Thomas (GBR)	INEOS Grenadiers	+ 1' 41"
3	Primož Roglič (SLO)	Team Jumbo–Visma	+ 1' 43"
4	João Almeida (POR)	UAE Team Emirates	+ 2' 03"
5	Andreas Leknessund (NOR)	Team DSM	+ 2' 23"
6	Damiano Caruso (ITA)	Team Bahrain Victorious	+ 3' 09"
7	Lennard Kämna (GER)	Bora–Hansgrohe	+ 3' 33"
8	Eddie Dunbar (IRL)	Team Jayco–AlUla	+ 4' 13"
9	Thymen Arensman (NED)	INEOS Grenadiers	+ 4' 26"
10	Laurens De Plus (BEL)	INEOS Grenadiers	+ 4' 49"

== Stage 15 ==
21 May 2023 — Seregno to Bergamo, 195 km (121 mi)

Stage 15 Result
Rank	Rider	Team	Time
1	Brandon McNulty (USA)	UAE Team Emirates	5h 13' 39"
2	Ben Healy (IRL)	EF Education–EasyPost	+ 0"
3	Marco Frigo (ITA)	Israel–Premier Tech	+ 0"
4	Bauke Mollema (NED)	Trek–Segafredo	+ 1' 51"
5	Einer Rubio (COL)	Movistar Team	+ 1' 51"
6	Simone Velasco (ITA)	Astana Qazaqstan Team	+ 2' 26"
7	Andrea Pasqualon (ITA)	Team Bahrain Victorious	+ 2' 26"
8	Laurens Huys (BEL)	Intermarché–Circus–Wanty	+ 3' 10"
9	Vincenzo Albanese (ITA)	Eolo–Kometa	+ 4' 13"
10	François Bidard (FRA)	Cofidis	+ 4' 13"

General classification after Stage 15
Rank	Rider	Team	Time
1	Bruno Armirail (FRA)	Groupama–FDJ	61h 38' 06"
2	Geraint Thomas (GBR)	INEOS Grenadiers	+ 1' 08"
3	Primož Roglič (SLO)	Team Jumbo–Visma	+ 1' 10"
4	João Almeida (POR)	UAE Team Emirates	+ 1' 30"
5	Andreas Leknessund (NOR)	Team DSM	+ 1' 50"
6	Damiano Caruso (ITA)	Team Bahrain Victorious	+ 2' 36"
7	Lennard Kämna (GER)	Bora–Hansgrohe	+ 3' 02"
8	Eddie Dunbar (IRL)	Team Jayco–AlUla	+ 3' 40"
9	Thymen Arensman (NED)	INEOS Grenadiers	+ 3' 55"
10	Laurens De Plus (BEL)	INEOS Grenadiers	+ 4' 18"

== Rest day 2 ==
22 May 2023 — Bergamo

== Stage 16 ==
23 May 2023 — Sabbio Chiese to Monte Bondone, 203 km (126 mi)

Stage 16 Result
Rank	Rider	Team	Time
1	João Almeida (POR)	UAE Team Emirates	5h 53' 27"
2	Geraint Thomas (GBR)	INEOS Grenadiers	+ 0"
3	Primož Roglič (SLO)	Team Jumbo–Visma	+ 25"
4	Eddie Dunbar (IRL)	Team Jayco–AlUla	+ 25"
5	Sepp Kuss (USA)	Team Jumbo–Visma	+ 1' 03"
6	Ilan Van Wilder (BEL)	Soudal–Quick-Step	+ 1' 16"
7	Damiano Caruso (ITA)	Team Bahrain Victorious	+ 1' 16"
8	Einer Rubio (COL)	Movistar Team	+ 1' 16"
9	Laurens De Plus (BEL)	INEOS Grenadiers	+ 1' 16"
10	Thymen Arensman (NED)	INEOS Grenadiers	+ 1' 16"

General classification after Stage 16
Rank	Rider	Team	Time
1	Geraint Thomas (GBR)	INEOS Grenadiers	67h 32' 35"
2	João Almeida (POR)	UAE Team Emirates	+ 18"
3	Primož Roglič (SLO)	Team Jumbo–Visma	+ 29"
4	Damiano Caruso (ITA)	Team Bahrain Victorious	+ 2' 50"
5	Eddie Dunbar (IRL)	Team Jayco–AlUla	+ 3' 03"
6	Lennard Kämna (GER)	Bora–Hansgrohe	+ 3' 20"
7	Bruno Armirail (FRA)	Groupama–FDJ	+ 3' 22"
8	Andreas Leknessund (NOR)	Team DSM	+ 3' 30"
9	Thymen Arensman (NED)	INEOS Grenadiers	+ 4' 09"
10	Laurens De Plus (BEL)	INEOS Grenadiers	+ 4' 32"

== Stage 17 ==
24 May 2023 — Pergine Valsugana to Caorle, 197 km (122 mi)

Stage 17 Result
Rank	Rider	Team	Time
1	Alberto Dainese (ITA)	Team DSM	4h 26' 08"
2	Jonathan Milan (ITA)	Team Bahrain Victorious	+ 0"
3	Michael Matthews (AUS)	Team Jayco–AlUla	+ 0"
4	Niccolò Bonifazio (ITA)	Intermarché–Circus–Wanty	+ 0"
5	Simone Consonni (ITA)	Cofidis	+ 0"
6	Fernando Gaviria (COL)	Movistar Team	+ 0"
7	Andrea Pasqualon (ITA)	Team Bahrain Victorious	+ 0"
8	Alex Kirsch (LUX)	Trek–Segafredo	+ 0"
9	Stefano Oldani (ITA)	Alpecin–Deceuninck	+ 0"
10	Pascal Ackermann (GER)	UAE Team Emirates	+ 0"

General classification after Stage 17
Rank	Rider	Team	Time
1	Geraint Thomas (GBR)	INEOS Grenadiers	71h 58' 43"
2	João Almeida (POR)	UAE Team Emirates	+ 18"
3	Primož Roglič (SLO)	Team Jumbo–Visma	+ 29"
4	Damiano Caruso (ITA)	Team Bahrain Victorious	+ 2' 50"
5	Eddie Dunbar (IRL)	Team Jayco–AlUla	+ 3' 03"
6	Lennard Kämna (GER)	Bora–Hansgrohe	+ 3' 20"
7	Bruno Armirail (FRA)	Groupama–FDJ	+ 3' 22"
8	Andreas Leknessund (NOR)	Team DSM	+ 3' 30"
9	Thymen Arensman (NED)	INEOS Grenadiers	+ 4' 09"
10	Laurens De Plus (BEL)	INEOS Grenadiers	+ 4' 32"

== Stage 18 ==
25 May 2023 — Oderzo to Zoldo Alto, 161 km (100 mi)

Stage 18 Result
Rank	Rider	Team	Time
1	Filippo Zana (ITA)	Team Jayco–AlUla	4h 25' 12"
2	Thibaut Pinot (FRA)	Groupama–FDJ	+ 0"
3	Warren Barguil (FRA)	Arkéa–Samsic	+ 50"
4	Derek Gee (CAN)	Israel–Premier Tech	+ 1' 03"
5	Aurélien Paret-Peintre (FRA)	AG2R Citroën Team	+ 1' 24"
6	Marco Frigo (ITA)	Israel–Premier Tech	+ 1' 24"
7	Primož Roglič (SLO)	Team Jumbo–Visma	+ 1' 56"
8	Geraint Thomas (GBR)	INEOS Grenadiers	+ 1' 56"
9	João Almeida (POR)	UAE Team Emirates	+ 2' 17"
10	Eddie Dunbar (IRL)	Team Jayco–AlUla	+ 2' 32"

General classification after Stage 18
Rank	Rider	Team	Time
1	Geraint Thomas (GBR)	INEOS Grenadiers	76h 25' 51"
2	Primož Roglič (SLO)	Team Jumbo–Visma	+ 29"
3	João Almeida (POR)	UAE Team Emirates	+ 39"
4	Eddie Dunbar (IRL)	Team Jayco–AlUla	+ 3' 39"
5	Damiano Caruso (ITA)	Team Bahrain Victorious	+ 3' 51"
6	Lennard Kämna (GER)	Bora–Hansgrohe	+ 4' 27"
7	Thibaut Pinot (FRA)	Groupama–FDJ	+ 4' 43"
8	Andreas Leknessund (NOR)	Team DSM	+ 4' 47"
9	Thymen Arensman (NED)	INEOS Grenadiers	+ 4' 53"
10	Laurens De Plus (BEL)	INEOS Grenadiers	+ 5' 52"

== Stage 19 ==
26 May 2023 — Longarone to Tre Cime di Lavaredo, 183 km (114 mi)

Stage 19 Result
Rank	Rider	Team	Time
1	Santiago Buitrago (COL)	Team Bahrain Victorious	5h 28' 07"
2	Derek Gee (CAN)	Israel–Premier Tech	+ 51"
3	Magnus Cort (DEN)	EF Education–EasyPost	+ 1' 46"
4	Primož Roglič (SLO)	Team Jumbo–Visma	+ 1' 46"
5	Geraint Thomas (GBR)	INEOS Grenadiers	+ 1' 49"
6	João Almeida (POR)	UAE Team Emirates	+ 2' 09"
7	Damiano Caruso (ITA)	Team Bahrain Victorious	+ 2' 09"
8	Thymen Arensman (NED)	INEOS Grenadiers	+ 2' 09"
9	Thibaut Pinot (FRA)	Groupama–FDJ	+ 2' 16"
10	Einer Rubio (COL)	Movistar Team	+ 2' 26"

General classification after Stage 19
Rank	Rider	Team	Time
1	Geraint Thomas (GBR)	INEOS Grenadiers	81h 55' 47"
2	Primož Roglič (SLO)	Team Jumbo–Visma	+ 26"
3	João Almeida (POR)	UAE Team Emirates	+ 59"
4	Damiano Caruso (ITA)	Team Bahrain Victorious	+ 4' 11"
5	Eddie Dunbar (IRL)	Team Jayco–AlUla	+ 4' 53"
6	Thibaut Pinot (FRA)	Groupama–FDJ	+ 5' 10"
7	Thymen Arensman (NED)	INEOS Grenadiers	+ 5' 13"
8	Lennard Kämna (GER)	Bora–Hansgrohe	+ 5' 54"
9	Andreas Leknessund (NOR)	Team DSM	+ 6' 08"
10	Laurens De Plus (BEL)	INEOS Grenadiers	+ 7' 30"

== Stage 20 ==
27 May 2023 — Tarvisio to Monte Lussari, 18.6 km (11.6 mi) (ITT)

Stage 20 Result
Rank	Rider	Team	Time
1	Primož Roglič (SLO)	Team Jumbo–Visma	44' 23"
2	Geraint Thomas (GBR)	INEOS Grenadiers	+ 40"
3	João Almeida (POR)	UAE Team Emirates	+ 42"
4	Damiano Caruso (ITA)	Team Bahrain Victorious	+ 55"
5	Thibaut Pinot (FRA)	Groupama–FDJ	+ 59"
6	Sepp Kuss (USA)	Team Jumbo–Visma	+ 1' 05"
7	Brandon McNulty (USA)	UAE Team Emirates	+ 1' 07"
8	Thymen Arensman (NED)	INEOS Grenadiers	+ 1' 18"
9	Andreas Leknessund (NOR)	Team DSM	+ 1' 49"
10	Jay Vine (AUS)	UAE Team Emirates	+ 1' 53"

General classification after Stage 20
Rank	Rider	Team	Time
1	Primož Roglič (SLO)	Team Jumbo–Visma	82h 40' 36"
2	Geraint Thomas (GBR)	INEOS Grenadiers	+ 14"
3	João Almeida (POR)	UAE Team Emirates	+ 1' 15"
4	Damiano Caruso (ITA)	Team Bahrain Victorious	+ 4' 40"
5	Thibaut Pinot (FRA)	Groupama–FDJ	+ 5' 43"
6	Thymen Arensman (NED)	INEOS Grenadiers	+ 6' 05"
7	Eddie Dunbar (IRL)	Team Jayco–AlUla	+ 7' 30"
8	Andreas Leknessund (NOR)	Team DSM	+ 7' 31"
9	Lennard Kämna (GER)	Bora–Hansgrohe	+ 7' 46"
10	Laurens De Plus (BEL)	INEOS Grenadiers	+ 9' 08"

== Stage 21 ==
28 May 2023 — Rome to Rome, 126 km (78 mi)

Stage 21 Result
Rank	Rider	Team	Time
1	Mark Cavendish (GBR)	Astana Qazaqstan Team	2h 48' 26"
2	Alex Kirsch (LUX)	Trek–Segafredo	+ 0"
3	Filippo Fiorelli (ITA)	Green Project–Bardiani–CSF–Faizanè	+ 0"
4	Alberto Dainese (ITA)	Team DSM	+ 0"
5	Alexander Krieger (GER)	Alpecin–Deceuninck	+ 0"
6	Jake Stewart (GBR)	Groupama–FDJ	+ 0"
7	Fernando Gaviria (COL)	Movistar Team	+ 0"
8	Michael Matthews (AUS)	Team Jayco–AlUla	+ 0"
9	Arne Marit (BEL)	Intermarché–Circus–Wanty	+ 0"
10	Campbell Stewart (NZL)	Team Jayco–AlUla	+ 0"

General classification after Stage 21
Rank	Rider	Team	Time
1	Primož Roglič (SLO)	Team Jumbo–Visma	85h 29' 02"
2	Geraint Thomas (GBR)	INEOS Grenadiers	+ 14"
3	João Almeida (POR)	UAE Team Emirates	+ 1' 15"
4	Damiano Caruso (ITA)	Team Bahrain Victorious	+ 4' 40"
5	Thibaut Pinot (FRA)	Groupama–FDJ	+ 5' 43"
6	Thymen Arensman (NED)	INEOS Grenadiers	+ 6' 05"
7	Eddie Dunbar (IRL)	Team Jayco–AlUla	+ 7' 30"
8	Andreas Leknessund (NOR)	Team DSM	+ 7' 31"
9	Lennard Kämna (GER)	Bora–Hansgrohe	+ 7' 46"
10	Laurens De Plus (BEL)	INEOS Grenadiers	+ 9' 08"
