= 2023 Giro d'Italia, Stage 1 to Stage 11 =

Cycling results

The 2023 Giro d'Italia was the 106th edition of the Giro d'Italia, one of cycling's Grand Tours. The Giro began in Fossacesia on 6 May, and Stage 11 occurred on 17 May with a stage to Tortona. The race finished in Rome on 28 May.

== Classification standings ==
Legend
A pink jersey.	Denotes the leader of the general classification	A blue jersey.	Denotes the leader of the mountains classification
A violet jersey.	Denotes the leader of the points classification	A white jersey.	Denotes the leader of the young rider classification
A white jersey with a red number bib.	Denotes the winner of the combativity award		

== Stage 1 ==
6 May 2023 — Fossacesia to Ortona, 19.6 km (12.2 mi) (ITT)

Stage 1 Result
Rank	Rider	Team	Time
1	Remco Evenepoel (BEL)	Soudal–Quick-Step	21' 18"
2	Filippo Ganna (ITA)	INEOS Grenadiers	+ 22"
3	João Almeida (POR)	UAE Team Emirates	+ 29"
4	Tao Geoghegan Hart (GBR)	INEOS Grenadiers	+ 40"
5	Stefan Küng (SUI)	Groupama–FDJ	+ 43"
6	Primož Roglič (SLO)	Team Jumbo–Visma	+ 43"
7	Jay Vine (AUS)	UAE Team Emirates	+ 46"
8	Brandon McNulty (USA)	UAE Team Emirates	+ 48"
9	Geraint Thomas (GBR)	INEOS Grenadiers	+ 55"
10	Aleksandr Vlasov	Bora–Hansgrohe	+ 55"

General classification after Stage 1
Rank	Rider	Team	Time
1	Remco Evenepoel (BEL)	Soudal–Quick-Step	21' 18"
2	Filippo Ganna (ITA)	INEOS Grenadiers	+ 22"
3	João Almeida (POR)	UAE Team Emirates	+ 29"
4	Tao Geoghegan Hart (GBR)	INEOS Grenadiers	+ 40"
5	Stefan Küng (SUI)	Groupama–FDJ	+ 43"
6	Primož Roglič (SLO)	Team Jumbo–Visma	+ 43"
7	Jay Vine (AUS)	UAE Team Emirates	+ 46"
8	Brandon McNulty (USA)	UAE Team Emirates	+ 48"
9	Geraint Thomas (GBR)	INEOS Grenadiers	+ 55"
10	Aleksandr Vlasov	Bora–Hansgrohe	+ 55"

== Stage 2 ==
7 May 2023 — Teramo to San Salvo, 202 km (126 mi)

Stage 2 Result
Rank	Rider	Team	Time
1	Jonathan Milan (ITA)	Team Bahrain Victorious	4h 55' 11"
2	David Dekker (NED)	Arkéa–Samsic	+ 0"
3	Kaden Groves (AUS)	Alpecin–Deceuninck	+ 0"
4	Arne Marit (BEL)	Intermarché–Circus–Wanty	+ 0"
5	Marius Mayrhofer (GER)	Team DSM	+ 0"
6	Pascal Ackermann (GER)	UAE Team Emirates	+ 0"
7	Fernando Gaviria (COL)	Movistar Team	+ 0"
8	Niccolò Bonifazio (ITA)	Intermarché–Circus–Wanty	+ 0"
9	Jake Stewart (GBR)	Groupama–FDJ	+ 0"
10	Michael Matthews (AUS)	Team Jayco–AlUla	+ 0"

General classification after Stage 2
Rank	Rider	Team	Time
1	Remco Evenepoel (BEL)	Soudal–Quick-Step	5h 16' 29"
2	Filippo Ganna (ITA)	INEOS Grenadiers	+ 22"
3	João Almeida (POR)	UAE Team Emirates	+ 29"
4	Stefan Küng (SUI)	Groupama–FDJ	+ 43"
5	Primož Roglič (SLO)	Team Jumbo–Visma	+ 43"
6	Geraint Thomas (GBR)	INEOS Grenadiers	+ 55"
7	Aleksandr Vlasov	Bora–Hansgrohe	+ 55"
8	Tao Geoghegan Hart (GBR)	INEOS Grenadiers	+ 59"
9	Brandon McNulty (USA)	UAE Team Emirates	+ 1' 00"
10	Jay Vine (AUS)	UAE Team Emirates	+ 1' 05"

== Stage 3 ==
8 May 2023 — Vasto to Melfi, 213 km (132 mi)

Stage 3 Result
Rank	Rider	Team	Time
1	Michael Matthews (AUS)	Team Jayco–AlUla	5h 01' 41"
2	Mads Pedersen (DEN)	Trek–Segafredo	+ 0"
3	Kaden Groves (AUS)	Alpecin–Deceuninck	+ 0"
4	Vincenzo Albanese (ITA)	Eolo–Kometa	+ 0"
5	Stefano Oldani (ITA)	Alpecin–Deceuninck	+ 0"
6	Sven Erik Bystrøm (NOR)	Intermarché–Circus–Wanty	+ 0"
7	Primož Roglič (SLO)	Team Jumbo–Visma	+ 0"
8	Simone Velasco (ITA)	Astana Qazaqstan Team	+ 0"
9	Toms Skujiņš (LAT)	Trek–Segafredo	+ 0"
10	Andrea Vendrame (ITA)	AG2R Citroën Team	+ 0"

General classification after Stage 3
Rank	Rider	Team	Time
1	Remco Evenepoel (BEL)	Soudal–Quick-Step	10h 18' 07"
2	João Almeida (POR)	UAE Team Emirates	+ 32"
3	Primož Roglič (SLO)	Team Jumbo–Visma	+ 44"
4	Stefan Küng (SUI)	Groupama–FDJ	+ 46"
5	Geraint Thomas (GBR)	INEOS Grenadiers	+ 58"
6	Aleksandr Vlasov	Bora–Hansgrohe	+ 58"
7	Tao Geoghegan Hart (GBR)	INEOS Grenadiers	+ 1' 02"
8	Michael Matthews (AUS)	Team Jayco–AlUla	+ 1' 02"
9	Jay Vine (AUS)	UAE Team Emirates	+ 1' 08"
10	Mads Pedersen (DEN)	Trek–Segafredo	+ 1' 18"

== Stage 4 ==
9 May 2023 — Venosa to Lago Laceno, 175 km (109 mi)

Stage 4 Result
Rank	Rider	Team	Time
1	Aurélien Paret-Peintre (FRA)	AG2R Citroën Team	4h 16' 04"
2	Andreas Leknessund (NOR)	Team DSM	+ 2"
3	Toms Skujiņš (LAT)	Trek–Segafredo	+ 57"
4	Vincenzo Albanese (ITA)	Eolo–Kometa	+ 57"
5	Nicola Conci (ITA)	Alpecin–Deceuninck	+ 1' 02"
6	Amanuel Ghebreigzabhier (ERI)	Trek–Segafredo	+ 1' 07"
7	Koen Bouwman (NED)	Team Jumbo–Visma	+ 2' 01"
8	Damiano Caruso (ITA)	Team Bahrain Victorious	+ 2' 01"
9	Eddie Dunbar (IRL)	Team Jayco–AlUla	+ 2' 01"
10	Aleksandr Vlasov	Bora–Hansgrohe	+ 2' 01"

General classification after Stage 4
Rank	Rider	Team	Time
1	Andreas Leknessund (NOR)	Team DSM	14h 35' 44"
2	Remco Evenepoel (BEL)	Soudal–Quick-Step	+ 28"
3	Aurélien Paret-Peintre (FRA)	AG2R Citroën Team	+ 30"
4	João Almeida (POR)	UAE Team Emirates	+ 1' 00"
5	Primož Roglič (SLO)	Team Jumbo–Visma	+ 1' 12"
6	Geraint Thomas (GBR)	INEOS Grenadiers	+ 1' 26"
7	Aleksandr Vlasov	Bora–Hansgrohe	+ 1' 26"
8	Toms Skujiņš (LAT)	Trek–Segafredo	+ 1' 29"
9	Tao Geoghegan Hart (GBR)	INEOS Grenadiers	+ 1' 30"
10	Jay Vine (AUS)	UAE Team Emirates	+ 1' 36"

== Stage 5 ==
10 May 2023 — Atripalda to Salerno, 171 km (106 mi)

Stage 5 Result
Rank	Rider	Team	Time
1	Kaden Groves (AUS)	Alpecin–Deceuninck	4h 30' 19"
2	Jonathan Milan (ITA)	Team Bahrain Victorious	+ 0"
3	Mads Pedersen (DEN)	Trek–Segafredo	+ 0"
4	Mark Cavendish (GBR)	Astana Qazaqstan Team	+ 0"
5	Nicolas Dalla Valle (ITA)	Team Corratec–Selle Italia	+ 0"
6	Mirco Maestri (ITA)	Eolo–Kometa	+ 0"
7	Filippo Fiorelli (ITA)	Green Project–Bardiani–CSF–Faizanè	+ 0"
8	Andrea Vendrame (ITA)	AG2R Citroën Team	+ 0"
9	Michael Matthews (AUS)	Team Jayco–AlUla	+ 0"
10	Niccolò Bonifazio (ITA)	Intermarché–Circus–Wanty	+ 0"

General classification after Stage 5
Rank	Rider	Team	Time
1	Andreas Leknessund (NOR)	Team DSM	19h 06' 03"
2	Remco Evenepoel (BEL)	Soudal–Quick-Step	+ 28"
3	Aurélien Paret-Peintre (FRA)	AG2R Citroën Team	+ 30"
4	João Almeida (POR)	UAE Team Emirates	+ 1' 00"
5	Primož Roglič (SLO)	Team Jumbo–Visma	+ 1' 12"
6	Geraint Thomas (GBR)	INEOS Grenadiers	+ 1' 26"
7	Aleksandr Vlasov	Bora–Hansgrohe	+ 1' 26"
8	Toms Skujiņš (LAT)	Trek–Segafredo	+ 1' 29"
9	Tao Geoghegan Hart (GBR)	INEOS Grenadiers	+ 1' 30"
10	Vincenzo Albanese (ITA)	Eolo–Kometa	+ 1' 39"

== Stage 6 ==
11 May 2023 — Naples to Naples, 162 km (101 mi)

Stage 6 Result
Rank	Rider	Team	Time
1	Mads Pedersen (DEN)	Trek–Segafredo	3h 44' 45"
2	Jonathan Milan (ITA)	Team Bahrain Victorious	+ 0"
3	Pascal Ackermann (GER)	UAE Team Emirates	+ 0"
4	Kaden Groves (AUS)	Alpecin–Deceuninck	+ 0"
5	Fernando Gaviria (COL)	Movistar Team	+ 0"
6	Michael Matthews (AUS)	Team Jayco–AlUla	+ 0"
7	Vincenzo Albanese (ITA)	Eolo–Kometa	+ 0"
8	Marius Mayrhofer (GER)	Team DSM	+ 0"
9	Lorenzo Rota (ITA)	Intermarché–Circus–Wanty	+ 0"
10	Simone Velasco (ITA)	Astana Qazaqstan Team	+ 0"

General classification after Stage 6
Rank	Rider	Team	Time
1	Andreas Leknessund (NOR)	Team DSM	22h 50' 48"
2	Remco Evenepoel (BEL)	Soudal–Quick-Step	+ 28"
3	Aurélien Paret-Peintre (FRA)	AG2R Citroën Team	+ 30"
4	João Almeida (POR)	UAE Team Emirates	+ 1' 00"
5	Primož Roglič (SLO)	Team Jumbo–Visma	+ 1' 12"
6	Geraint Thomas (GBR)	INEOS Grenadiers	+ 1' 26"
7	Aleksandr Vlasov	Bora–Hansgrohe	+ 1' 26"
8	Toms Skujiņš (LAT)	Trek–Segafredo	+ 1' 29"
9	Tao Geoghegan Hart (GBR)	INEOS Grenadiers	+ 1' 30"
10	Vincenzo Albanese (ITA)	Eolo–Kometa	+ 1' 39"

== Stage 7 ==
12 May 2023 — Capua to Gran Sasso, 218 km (135 mi)

Stage 7 Result
Rank	Rider	Team	Time
1	Davide Bais (ITA)	Eolo–Kometa	6h 08' 40"
2	Karel Vacek (CZE)	Team Corratec–Selle Italia	+ 9"
3	Simone Petilli (ITA)	Intermarché–Circus–Wanty	+ 16"
4	Remco Evenepoel (BEL)	Soudal–Quick-Step	+ 3' 10"
5	Primož Roglič (SLO)	Team Jumbo–Visma	+ 3' 10"
6	Thibaut Pinot (FRA)	Groupama–FDJ	+ 3' 10"
7	Geraint Thomas (GBR)	INEOS Grenadiers	+ 3' 10"
8	João Almeida (POR)	UAE Team Emirates	+ 3' 10"
9	Eddie Dunbar (IRL)	Team Jayco–AlUla	+ 3' 10"
10	Christian Scaroni (ITA)	Astana Qazaqstan Team	+ 3' 10"

General classification after Stage 7
Rank	Rider	Team	Time
1	Andreas Leknessund (NOR)	Team DSM	29h 02' 38"
2	Remco Evenepoel (BEL)	Soudal–Quick-Step	+ 28"
3	Aurélien Paret-Peintre (FRA)	AG2R Citroën Team	+ 30"
4	João Almeida (POR)	UAE Team Emirates	+ 1' 00"
5	Primož Roglič (SLO)	Team Jumbo–Visma	+ 1' 12"
6	Geraint Thomas (GBR)	INEOS Grenadiers	+ 1' 26"
7	Aleksandr Vlasov	Bora–Hansgrohe	+ 1' 26"
8	Tao Geoghegan Hart (GBR)	INEOS Grenadiers	+ 1' 30"
9	Lennard Kämna (GER)	Bora–Hansgrohe	+ 1' 54"
10	Damiano Caruso (ITA)	Team Bahrain Victorious	+ 1' 59"

== Stage 8 ==
13 May 2023 — Terni to Fossombrone, 207 km (129 mi)

Stage 8 Result
Rank	Rider	Team	Time
1	Ben Healy (IRL)	EF Education–EasyPost	4h 44' 24"
2	Derek Gee (CAN)	Israel–Premier Tech	+ 1' 49"
3	Filippo Zana (ITA)	Team Jayco–AlUla	+ 1' 49"
4	Warren Barguil (FRA)	Arkéa–Samsic	+ 1' 49"
5	Carlos Verona (ESP)	Movistar Team	+ 2' 12"
6	Mattia Bais (ITA)	Eolo–Kometa	+ 2' 37"
7	Toms Skujiņš (LAT)	Trek–Segafredo	+ 3' 51"
8	Alessandro Tonelli (ITA)	Green Project–Bardiani–CSF–Faizanè	+ 3' 56"
9	Oscar Riesebeek (NED)	Alpecin–Deceuninck	+ 4' 00"
10	Tao Geoghegan Hart (GBR)	INEOS Grenadiers	+ 4' 34"

General classification after Stage 8
Rank	Rider	Team	Time
1	Andreas Leknessund (NOR)	Team DSM	33h 52' 10"
2	Remco Evenepoel (BEL)	Soudal–Quick-Step	+ 8"
3	Primož Roglič (SLO)	Team Jumbo–Visma	+ 38"
4	João Almeida (POR)	UAE Team Emirates	+ 40"
5	Geraint Thomas (GBR)	INEOS Grenadiers	+ 52"
6	Tao Geoghegan Hart (GBR)	INEOS Grenadiers	+ 56"
7	Aurélien Paret-Peintre (FRA)	AG2R Citroën Team	+ 58"
8	Aleksandr Vlasov	Bora–Hansgrohe	+ 1' 26"
9	Damiano Caruso (ITA)	Team Bahrain Victorious	+ 1' 39"
10	Lennard Kämna (GER)	Bora–Hansgrohe	+ 1' 54"

== Stage 9 ==
14 May 2023 — Savignano sul Rubicone to Cesena, 35 km (22 mi) (ITT)

Stage 9 Result
Rank	Rider	Team	Time
1	Remco Evenepoel (BEL)	Soudal–Quick-Step	41' 24"
2	Geraint Thomas (GBR)	INEOS Grenadiers	+ 1"
3	Tao Geoghegan Hart (GBR)	INEOS Grenadiers	+ 2"
4	Stefan Küng (SUI)	Groupama–FDJ	+ 4"
5	Bruno Armirail (FRA)	Groupama–FDJ	+ 8"
6	Primož Roglič (SLO)	Team Jumbo–Visma	+ 17"
7	Thymen Arensman (NED)	INEOS Grenadiers	+ 24"
8	Aleksandr Vlasov	Bora–Hansgrohe	+ 30"
9	João Almeida (POR)	UAE Team Emirates	+ 35"
10	Damiano Caruso (ITA)	Team Bahrain Victorious	+ 42"

General classification after Stage 9
Rank	Rider	Team	Time
1	Remco Evenepoel (BEL)	Soudal–Quick-Step	34h 33' 42"
2	Geraint Thomas (GBR)	INEOS Grenadiers	+ 45"
3	Primož Roglič (SLO)	Team Jumbo–Visma	+ 47"
4	Tao Geoghegan Hart (GBR)	INEOS Grenadiers	+ 50"
5	João Almeida (POR)	UAE Team Emirates	+ 1' 07"
6	Andreas Leknessund (NOR)	Team DSM	+ 1' 07"
7	Aleksandr Vlasov	Bora–Hansgrohe	+ 1' 48"
8	Damiano Caruso (ITA)	Team Bahrain Victorious	+ 2' 13"
9	Lennard Kämna (GER)	Bora–Hansgrohe	+ 2' 37"
10	Pavel Sivakov (FRA)	INEOS Grenadiers	+ 3' 00"

== Rest day 1 ==
15 May 2023 — Cesena

Shortly after the Stage 9 time trial, stage winner and overall general classification leader Remco Evenepoel tested positive for COVID-19 and was forced to withdraw from the race. While by tradition, when a leader pulls out through injury after the completion of the stage, the new 'leader' does not take on the jersey until the end of the following stage, the rest day in grand tours is treated as a stage for those purposes. As such, at the completion of the rest day, Geraint Thomas would become the new maglia rosa, and will wear pink when the race resumes at the beginning of Tuesday morning.

The new general classifications standings would become as follows:

General classification at end of rest day 1
Rank	Rider	Team	Time
1	Geraint Thomas (GBR)	INEOS Grenadiers	34h 34' 27"
2	Primož Roglič (SLO)	Team Jumbo–Visma	+ 2"
3	Tao Geoghegan Hart (GBR)	INEOS Grenadiers	+ 5"
4	João Almeida (POR)	UAE Team Emirates	+ 22"
5	Andreas Leknessund (NOR)	Team DSM	+ 22"
6	Aleksandr Vlasov	Bora–Hansgrohe	+ 1' 03"
7	Damiano Caruso (ITA)	Team Bahrain Victorious	+ 1' 28"
8	Lennard Kämna (GER)	Bora–Hansgrohe	+ 1' 52"
9	Pavel Sivakov (FRA)	INEOS Grenadiers	+ 2' 15"
10	Jay Vine (AUS)	UAE Team Emirates	+ 2' 24"

== Stage 10 ==
16 May 2023 — Scandiano to Viareggio, 196 km (122 mi)

Nine riders, including Evenepoel, Domenico Pozzovivo, Stefan Kung and Rigoberto Uran did not start the race after the rest day, Evenepoel announcing such on Sunday evening, releasing the maglia rosa for Geraint Thomas to wear. Top-10 rider and GC contender Aleksandr Vlasov abandoned the race midway through the stage, while fellow top-10 rider Jay Vine crashed and lost over ten minutes to the maglia rosa group.

Stage 10 Result
Rank	Rider	Team	Time
1	Magnus Cort (DEN)	EF Education–EasyPost	4h 51' 15"
2	Derek Gee (CAN)	Israel–Premier Tech	+ 0"
3	Alessandro De Marchi (ITA)	Team Jayco–AlUla	+ 2"
4	Mads Pedersen (DEN)	Trek–Segafredo	+ 51"
5	Pascal Ackermann (GER)	UAE Team Emirates	+ 51"
6	Stefano Oldani (ITA)	Alpecin–Deceuninck	+ 51"
7	Jonathan Milan (ITA)	Team Bahrain Victorious	+ 51"
8	Mark Cavendish (GBR)	Astana Qazaqstan Team	+ 51"
9	Mirco Maestri (ITA)	Eolo–Kometa	+ 51"
10	Filippo Fiorelli (ITA)	Green Project–Bardiani–CSF–Faizanè	+ 51"

General classification after Stage 10
Rank	Rider	Team	Time
1	Geraint Thomas (GBR)	INEOS Grenadiers	39h 26' 33"
2	Primož Roglič (SLO)	Team Jumbo–Visma	+ 2"
3	Tao Geoghegan Hart (GBR)	INEOS Grenadiers	+ 5"
4	João Almeida (POR)	UAE Team Emirates	+ 22"
5	Andreas Leknessund (NOR)	Team DSM	+ 35"
6	Damiano Caruso (ITA)	Team Bahrain Victorious	+ 1' 28"
7	Lennard Kämna (GER)	Bora–Hansgrohe	+ 1' 52"
8	Pavel Sivakov (FRA)	INEOS Grenadiers	+ 2' 15"
9	Eddie Dunbar (IRL)	Team Jayco–AlUla	+ 2' 32"
10	Thymen Arensman (NED)	INEOS Grenadiers	+ 2' 32"

== Stage 11 ==
17 May 2023 — Camaiore to Tortona, 219 km (136 mi)

The stage was marked by further abandonments. Four members of the Soudal Quickstep team tested positive for Covid-19, three days after team leader Remco Evenepoel left the race after a positive test. A crash on a wet descent late in the stage took out many of the leaders, with Thomas, Roglic, Sivikov and Geoghegen Hart all brought down. while maglia rosa Thomas and his closest rival Roglic remounted and rejoined the peloton, third place Geoghegen Hart was forced to abandon and go to hospital where he was diagnosed with a broken hip, while top ten teammate Pavel Sivakov managed to remount, but lost 13 minutes, effectively ending any perceived challenge.

Stage 11 Result
Rank	Rider	Team	Time
1	Pascal Ackermann (GER)	UAE Team Emirates	5h 09' 02"
2	Jonathan Milan (ITA)	Team Bahrain Victorious	+ 0"
3	Mark Cavendish (GBR)	Astana Qazaqstan Team	+ 0"
4	Mads Pedersen (DEN)	Trek–Segafredo	+ 0"
5	Stefano Oldani (ITA)	Alpecin–Deceuninck	+ 0"
6	Vincenzo Albanese (ITA)	Eolo–Kometa	+ 0"
7	Marius Mayrhofer (GER)	Team DSM	+ 0"
8	Davide Ballerini (ITA)	Soudal–Quick-Step	+ 0"
9	Simone Consonni (ITA)	Cofidis	+ 0"
10	Arne Marit (BEL)	Intermarché–Circus–Wanty	+ 0"

General classification after Stage 11
Rank	Rider	Team	Time
1	Geraint Thomas (GBR)	INEOS Grenadiers	44h 35' 35"
2	Primož Roglič (SLO)	Team Jumbo–Visma	+ 2"
3	João Almeida (POR)	UAE Team Emirates	+ 22"
4	Andreas Leknessund (NOR)	Team DSM	+ 35"
5	Damiano Caruso (ITA)	Team Bahrain Victorious	+ 1' 28"
6	Lennard Kämna (GER)	Bora–Hansgrohe	+ 1' 52"
7	Eddie Dunbar (IRL)	Team Jayco–AlUla	+ 2' 32"
8	Thymen Arensman (NED)	INEOS Grenadiers	+ 2' 32"
9	Laurens De Plus (BEL)	INEOS Grenadiers	+ 2' 36"
10	Aurélien Paret-Peintre (FRA)	AG2R Citroën Team	+ 2' 48"
