= 2023 Giro d'Italia =

Cycling competition

2023 UCI World Tour, race 22 of 35
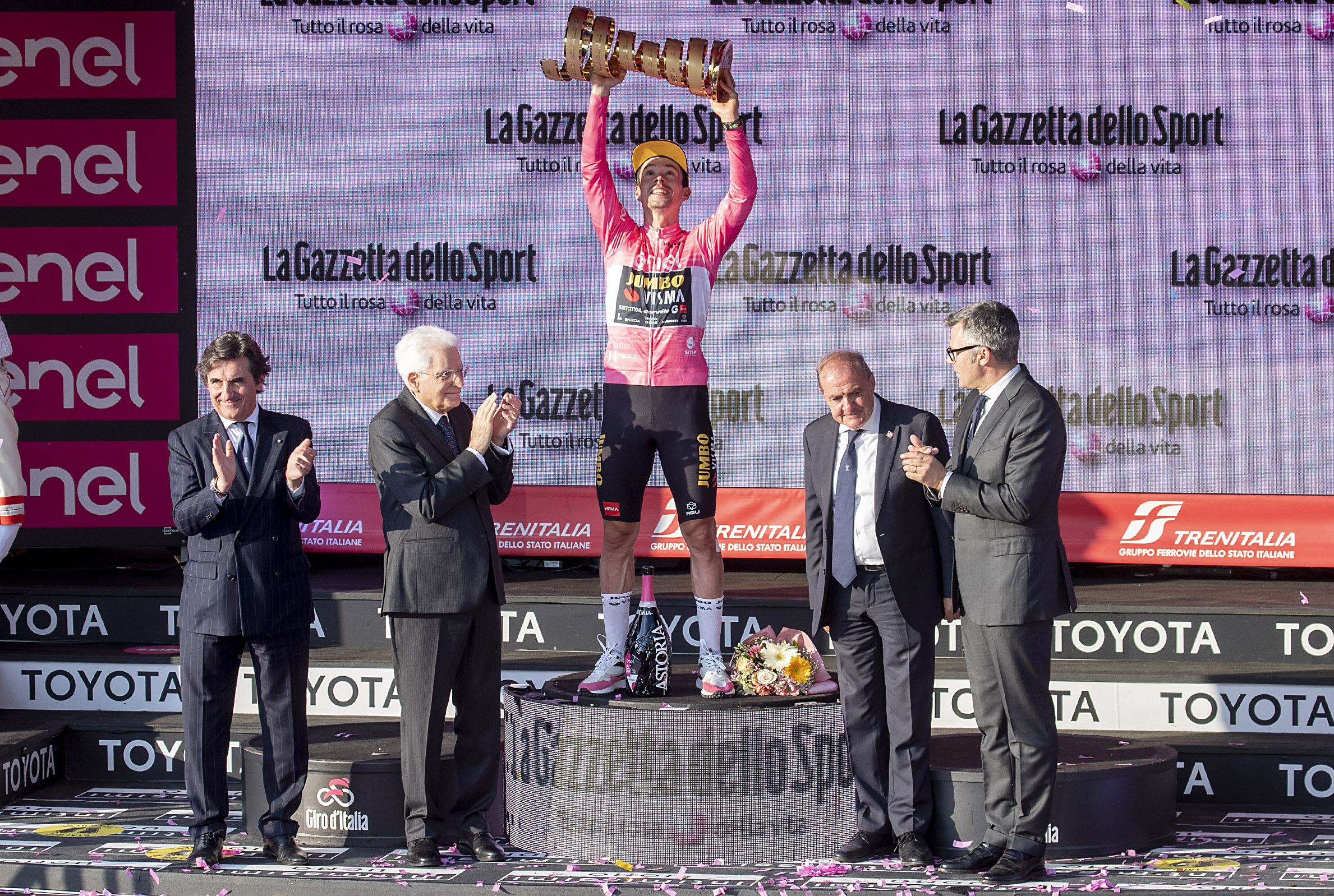
- Primož Roglič receiving the winner's trophy

Race details
- Dates: 6–28 May 2023
- Stages: 21
- Distance: 3,448 km (2,142 mi)
- Winning time: 85h 29' 02"

Results
Jersey awarded to the overall winner	Winner	Primož Roglič (SLO)	(Team Jumbo–Visma)
	Second	Geraint Thomas (GBR)	(INEOS Grenadiers)
	Third	João Almeida (POR)	(UAE Team Emirates)
Jersey awarded to the points classification winner	Points	Jonathan Milan (ITA)	(Team Bahrain Victorious)
Jersey awarded to the mountains classification winner	Mountains	Thibaut Pinot (FRA)	(Groupama–FDJ)
Jersey awarded to the young rider classification winner	Young rider	João Almeida (POR)	(UAE Team Emirates)
	Sprints	Toms Skujiņš (LAT)	(Trek–Segafredo)
Jersey awarded to the combativity classification winner	Combativity	Derek Gee (CAN)	(Israel–Premier Tech)
	Team	Team Bahrain Victorious	

The 2023 Giro d'Italia was the 106th edition of the Giro d'Italia, a three-week Grand Tour cycling stage race. The race started on 6 May in Fossacesia and finished on 28 May in Rome. There were 3 individual time trial stages and 6 stages longer than 200 km. The race was won by Primož Roglič of Team Jumbo–Visma, taking his fourth Grand Tour victory and becoming the first Slovenian to win the Giro.

== Teams ==
UCI WorldTeams

- AG2R Citroën Team
- Alpecin–Deceuninck
- Astana Qazaqstan Team
- Arkéa–Samsic
- Bora–Hansgrohe
- Cofidis
- EF Education–EasyPost
- Groupama–FDJ
- INEOS Grenadiers
- Intermarché–Circus–Wanty
- Movistar Team
- Soudal–Quick-Step
- Team Bahrain Victorious
- Team DSM
- Team Jayco–AlUla
- Team Jumbo–Visma
- Trek–Segafredo
- UAE Team Emirates

UCI ProTeams*

- Eolo–Kometa
- Green Project–Bardiani–CSF–Faizanè
- Israel–Premier Tech
- Team Corratec–Selle Italia

*Both Lotto–Dstny and Team TotalEnergies held guaranteed wildcards but declined to take part

== Pre-race favourites ==
Remco Evenepoel, Geraint Thomas and Primož Roglič were said to be favoured by the 2023 course. Remco Evenepoel won two stages and took over the pink jersey, but had to retire after stage 9 being tested positive for COVID-19.

== Route and stages ==
Stage characteristics and winners
Stage	Date	Course	Distance	Type	Winner	Ref
1	6 May	Fossacesia to Ortona	19.6 km (12.2 mi)	Individual time trial	Remco Evenepoel (BEL)	
2	7 May	Teramo to San Salvo	202 km (126 mi)	Flat stage	Jonathan Milan (ITA)	
3	8 May	Vasto to Melfi	213 km (132 mi)	Intermediate stage	Michael Matthews (AUS)	
4	9 May	Venosa to Lago Laceno	175 km (109 mi)	Intermediate stage	Aurélien Paret-Peintre (FRA)	
5	10 May	Atripalda to Salerno	171 km (106 mi)	Hilly stage	Kaden Groves (AUS)	
6	11 May	Naples to Naples	162 km (101 mi)	Hilly stage	Mads Pedersen (DEN)	
7	12 May	Capua to Gran Sasso	218 km (135 mi)	Mountain stage	Davide Bais (ITA)	
8	13 May	Terni to Fossombrone	207 km (129 mi)	Intermediate stage	Ben Healy (IRL)	
9	14 May	Savignano sul Rubicone to Cesena	35 km (22 mi)	Individual time trial	Remco Evenepoel (BEL)	
	15 May			Rest day		
10	16 May	Scandiano to Viareggio	196 km (122 mi)	Hilly stage	Magnus Cort (DEN)	
11	17 May	Camaiore to Tortona	219 km (136 mi)	Hilly stage	Pascal Ackermann (GER)	
12	18 May	Bra to Rivoli	185 km (115 mi)	Intermediate stage	Nico Denz (GER)	
13	19 May	~~Borgofranco d’Ivrea~~ Le Châble (Switzerland) to Crans-Montana (Switzerland) (Note: Distance originally was 207 km, then it was rerouted to 199 km. Before the start of the stage, the distance was shortened to 74.6 km due to bad weather conditions.)	74.6 km (46.4 mi)	Mountain stage	Einer Rubio (COL)	
14	20 May	Sierre (Switzerland) to Cassano Magnago	194 km (121 mi)	Hilly stage	Nico Denz (GER)	
15	21 May	Seregno to Bergamo	195 km (121 mi)	Mountain stage	Brandon McNulty (USA)	
	22 May			Rest day		
16	23 May	Sabbio Chiese to Monte Bondone	203 km (126 mi)	Mountain stage	João Almeida (POR)	
17	24 May	Pergine Valsugana to Caorle	197 km (122 mi)	Flat stage	Alberto Dainese (ITA)	
18	25 May	Oderzo to Zoldo Alto	161 km (100 mi)	Mountain stage	Filippo Zana (ITA)	
19	26 May	Longarone to Tre Cime di Lavaredo	183 km (114 mi)	Mountain stage	Santiago Buitrago (COL)	
20	27 May	Tarvisio to Monte Lussari	18.6 km (11.6 mi)	Individual time trial	Primož Roglič (SLO)	
21	28 May	Rome to Rome	126 km (78 mi)	Flat stage	Mark Cavendish (GBR)	
Total			3,449 km (2,143 mi)			

== Classification leadership ==
Classification leadership by stage
Stage	Winner	General classification	Points classification	Mountains classification	Young rider classification	General Super Team	Intermediate sprint classification	Combativity award	Breakaway classification	Fair play classification
1	Remco Evenepoel	Remco Evenepoel	Remco Evenepoel	Tao Geoghegan Hart	Remco Evenepoel	INEOS Grenadiers	not awarded	Rudy Molard	not awarded	Soudal–Quick-Step
2	Jonathan Milan	Remco Evenepoel	Jonathan Milan	Paul Lapeira	Remco Evenepoel	UAE Team Emirates	Stefano Gandin	Paul Lapeira	Mattia Bais	Soudal–Quick-Step
3	Michael Matthews	Remco Evenepoel	Jonathan Milan	Thibaut Pinot	Remco Evenepoel	UAE Team Emirates	Stefano Gandin	Veljko Stojnić	Veljko Stojnić	Soudal–Quick-Step
4	Aurélien Paret-Peintre	Andreas Leknessund	Jonathan Milan	Thibaut Pinot	Andreas Leknessund	INEOS Grenadiers	Stefano Gandin	Amanuel Ghebreigzabhier	Veljko Stojnić	Team DSM
5	Kaden Groves	Andreas Leknessund	Jonathan Milan	Thibaut Pinot	Andreas Leknessund	INEOS Grenadiers	Stefano Gandin	Stefano Gandin	Thomas Champion	Soudal–Quick-Step
6	Mads Pedersen	Andreas Leknessund	Jonathan Milan	Thibaut Pinot	Andreas Leknessund	INEOS Grenadiers	Stefano Gandin	Simon Clarke	Thomas Champion	Soudal–Quick-Step
7	Davide Bais	Andreas Leknessund	Jonathan Milan	Davide Bais	Andreas Leknessund	INEOS Grenadiers	Stefano Gandin	Henok Mulubrhan	Thomas Champion	Soudal–Quick-Step
8	Ben Healy	Andreas Leknessund	Jonathan Milan	Davide Bais	Andreas Leknessund	INEOS Grenadiers	Stefano Gandin	Ben Healy	Thomas Champion	Soudal–Quick-Step
9	Remco Evenepoel	Remco Evenepoel	Jonathan Milan	Davide Bais	Remco Evenepoel	INEOS Grenadiers	Stefano Gandin	Geraint Thomas	Thomas Champion	Soudal–Quick-Step
10	Magnus Cort	Geraint Thomas	Jonathan Milan	Davide Bais	João Almeida	INEOS Grenadiers	Stefano Gandin	Derek Gee	Alessandro De Marchi	AG2R Citroën Team
11	Pascal Ackermann	Geraint Thomas	Jonathan Milan	Davide Bais	João Almeida	INEOS Grenadiers	Davide Bais	Laurenz Rex	Thomas Champion	AG2R Citroën Team
12	Nico Denz	Geraint Thomas	Jonathan Milan	Davide Bais	João Almeida	Team Jumbo–Visma	Davide Bais	Toms Skujiņš	Thomas Champion	AG2R Citroën Team
13	Einer Rubio	Geraint Thomas	Jonathan Milan	Thibaut Pinot	João Almeida	Team Jumbo–Visma	Davide Bais	Thibaut Pinot	Thomas Champion	Groupama–FDJ
14	Nico Denz	Bruno Armirail	Jonathan Milan	Davide Bais	João Almeida	Team Bahrain Victorious	Davide Bais	Derek Gee	Thomas Champion	Groupama–FDJ
15	Brandon McNulty	Bruno Armirail	Jonathan Milan	Davide Bais	João Almeida	Team Bahrain Victorious	Davide Bais	Ben Healy	Thomas Champion	Groupama–FDJ
16	João Almeida	Geraint Thomas	Jonathan Milan	Ben Healy	João Almeida	Team Bahrain Victorious	Toms Skujiņš	João Almeida	Thomas Champion	Groupama–FDJ
17	Alberto Dainese	Geraint Thomas	Jonathan Milan	Ben Healy	João Almeida	Team Bahrain Victorious	Toms Skujiņš	Thomas Champion	Thomas Champion	Groupama–FDJ
18	Filippo Zana	Geraint Thomas	Jonathan Milan	Thibaut Pinot	João Almeida	Team Bahrain Victorious	Thomas Champion	Thibaut Pinot	Thomas Champion	Groupama–FDJ
19	Santiago Buitrago	Geraint Thomas	Jonathan Milan	Thibaut Pinot	João Almeida	Team Bahrain Victorious	Derek Gee	Derek Gee	Thomas Champion	Groupama–FDJ
20	Primož Roglič	Primož Roglič	Jonathan Milan	Thibaut Pinot	João Almeida	Team Bahrain Victorious	Derek Gee	Thibaut Pinot	Thomas Champion	Groupama–FDJ
21	Mark Cavendish	Primož Roglič	Jonathan Milan	Thibaut Pinot	João Almeida	Team Bahrain Victorious	Toms Skujiņš	not awarded	Thomas Champion	Groupama–FDJ
Final		Primož Roglič	Jonathan Milan	Thibaut Pinot	João Almeida	Team Bahrain Victorious	Toms Skujiņš	Derek Gee	Thomas Champion	Groupama–FDJ

- On stage 2, Filippo Ganna, who was second in the points classification, wore the cyclamen jersey because first placed Remco Evenepoel wore the pink jersey as leader of the general classification. Additionally, Brandon McNulty, who was third in the young rider classification, wore the white jersey because second placed João Almeida wore the Portuguese champion's jersey.
- On stage 5, Thymen Arensman, who was fourth in the young rider classification, wore the white jersey because first placed Andreas Leknessund wore the pink jersey as leader of the general classification, second placed Remco Evenepoel wore the World Champion's jersey and third placed João Almeida wore the Portuguese champion's jersey.
- On stage 10, Geraint Thomas, who was second in the general classification, wore the pink jersey because first placed Remco Evenepoel didn't start the stage after testing positive for COVID-19.

== Classification standings ==
Legend
A pink jersey.	Denotes the winner of the general classification		Denotes the winner of the mountains classification
A violet jersey.	Denotes the winner of the points classification	A white jersey.	Denotes the winner of the young rider classification
A white jersey with a red number bib.	Denotes the winner of the combativity award		

=== General classification ===
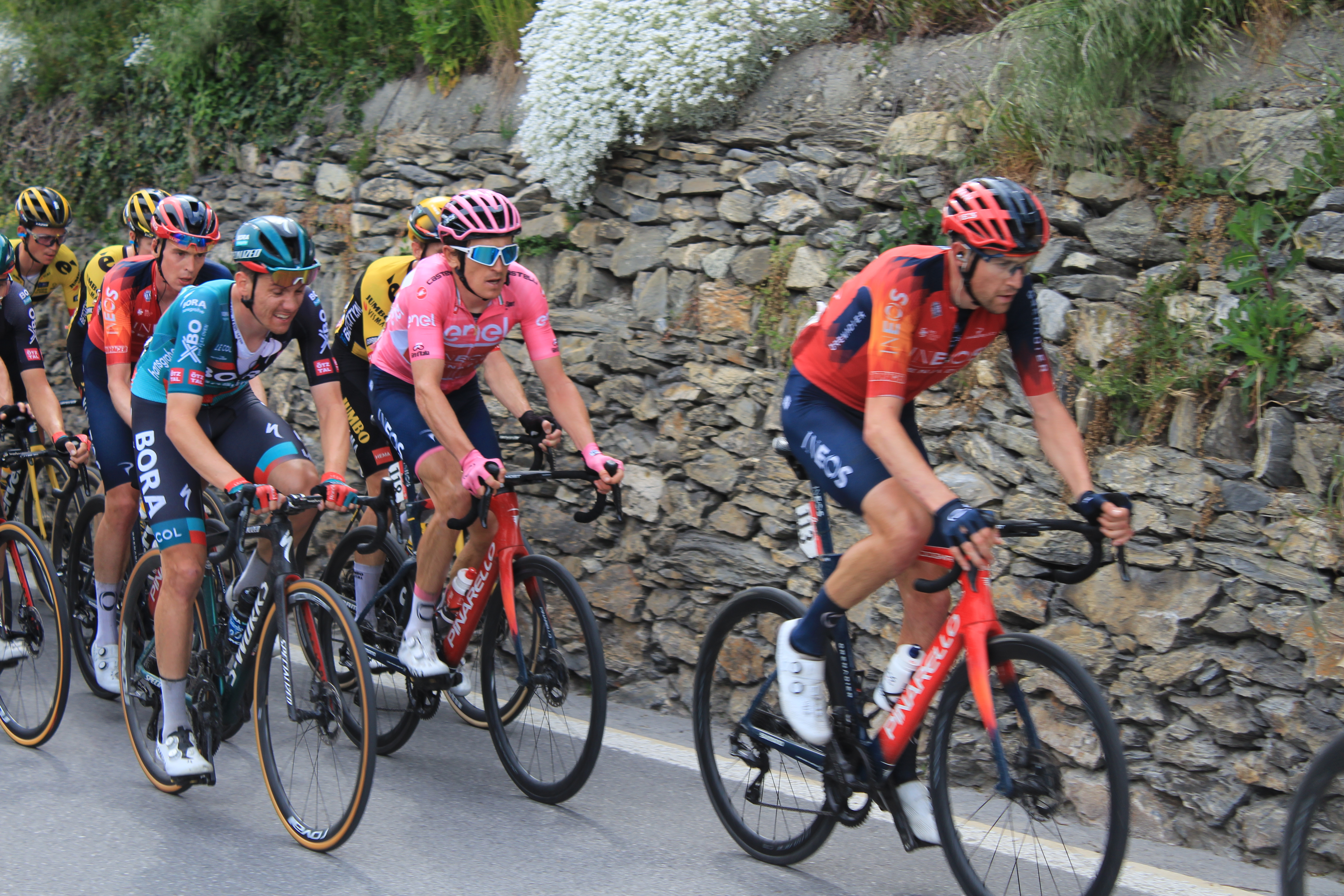
Geraint Thomas wearing the race leader's pink jersey during stage 13

Final general classification (1–10)
Rank	Rider	Team	Time
1	Primož Roglič (SLO)	Team Jumbo–Visma	85h 29' 02"
2	Geraint Thomas (GBR)	INEOS Grenadiers	+ 14"
3	João Almeida (POR)	UAE Team Emirates	+ 1' 15"
4	Damiano Caruso (ITA)	Team Bahrain Victorious	+ 4' 40"
5	Thibaut Pinot (FRA)	Groupama–FDJ	+ 5' 43"
6	Thymen Arensman (NED)	INEOS Grenadiers	+ 6' 05"
7	Eddie Dunbar (IRL)	Team Jayco–AlUla	+ 7' 30"
8	Andreas Leknessund (NOR)	Team DSM	+ 7' 31"
9	Lennard Kämna (GER)	Bora–Hansgrohe	+ 7' 46"
10	Laurens De Plus (BEL)	INEOS Grenadiers	+ 9' 08"

Final general classification (11–125)
Rank	Rider	Team	Time
11	Einer Rubio (COL)	Movistar Team	+ 10' 43"
12	Ilan Van Wilder (BEL)	Soudal–Quick-Step	+ 11' 58"
13	Santiago Buitrago (COL)	Team Bahrain Victorious	+ 12' 21"
14	Sepp Kuss (USA)	Team Jumbo–Visma	+ 13' 09"
15	Aurélien Paret-Peintre (FRA)	AG2R Citroën Team	+ 14' 13"
16	Bruno Armirail (FRA)	Groupama–FDJ	+ 17' 16"
17	Warren Barguil (FRA)	Arkéa–Samsic	+ 24' 06"
18	Filippo Zana (ITA)	Team Jayco–AlUla	+ 33' 22"
19	Jack Haig (AUS)	Team Bahrain Victorious	+ 34' 46"
20	Patrick Konrad (AUT)	Bora–Hansgrohe	+ 37' 57"
21	Lorenzo Fortunato (ITA)	Eolo–Kometa	+ 38' 37"
22	Derek Gee (CAN)	Israel–Premier Tech	+ 40' 54"
23	Nicolas Prodhomme (FRA)	AG2R Citroën Team	+ 46' 26"
24	Luis León Sánchez (ESP)	Astana Qazaqstan Team	+ 48' 03"
25	Koen Bouwman (NED)	Team Jumbo–Visma	+ 48' 15"
26	Simone Velasco (ITA)	Astana Qazaqstan Team	+ 51' 15"
27	Laurens Huys (BEL)	Intermarché–Circus–Wanty	+ 52' 18"
28	Diego Ulissi (ITA)	UAE Team Emirates	+ 1h 02' 50"
29	Brandon McNulty (USA)	UAE Team Emirates	+ 1h 07' 43"
30	Davide Formolo (ITA)	UAE Team Emirates	+ 1h 08' 58"
31	Toms Skujiņš (LAT)	Trek–Segafredo	+ 1h 10' 21"
32	Marco Frigo (ITA)	Israel–Premier Tech	+ 1h 24' 36"
33	Michel Hessmann (GER)	Team Jumbo–Visma	+ 1h 26' 24"
34	Jay Vine (AUS)	UAE Team Emirates	+ 1h 28' 59"
35	Jonathan Lastra (ESP)	Cofidis	+ 1h 29' 02"
36	Sam Oomen (NED)	Team Jumbo–Visma	+ 1h 30' 51"
37	Valentin Paret-Peintre (FRA)	AG2R Citroën Team	+ 1h 31' 52"
38	Alessandro De Marchi (ITA)	Team Jayco–AlUla	+ 1h 37' 50"
39	Bob Jungels (LUX)	Bora–Hansgrohe	+ 1h 37' 57"
40	Edoardo Zambanini (ITA)	Team Bahrain Victorious	+ 1h 38' 28"
41	Rohan Dennis (AUS)	Team Jumbo–Visma	+ 1h 38' 35"
42	Alessandro Tonelli (ITA)	Green Project–Bardiani–CSF–Faizanè	+ 1h 41' 48"
43	Vadim Pronskiy (KAZ)	Astana Qazaqstan Team	+ 1h 48' 31"
44	Larry Warbasse (USA)	AG2R Citroën Team	+ 1h 49' 54"
45	Stefano Oldani (ITA)	Alpecin–Deceuninck	+ 1h 57' 09"
46	Lorenzo Rota (ITA)	Intermarché–Circus–Wanty	+ 1h 57' 55"
47	Mattia Bais (ITA)	Eolo–Kometa	+ 2h 04' 10"
48	Alberto Bettiol (ITA)	EF Education–EasyPost	+ 2h 05' 06"
49	Carlos Verona (ESP)	Movistar Team	+ 2h 06' 24"
50	Bauke Mollema (NED)	Trek–Segafredo	+ 2h 08' 44"
51	Anton Palzer (GER)	Bora–Hansgrohe	+ 2h 08' 46"
52	Will Barta (USA)	Movistar Team	+ 2h 10' 12"
53	Jefferson Alexander Cepeda (ECU)	EF Education–EasyPost	+ 2h 12' 16"
54	François Bidard (FRA)	Cofidis	+ 2h 15' 00"
55	Ben Healy (IRL)	EF Education–EasyPost	+ 2h 18' 04"
56	Matthew Riccitello (USA)	Israel–Premier Tech	+ 2h 22' 57"
57	Nico Denz (GER)	Bora–Hansgrohe	+ 2h 23' 39"
58	Christian Scaroni (ITA)	Astana Qazaqstan Team	+ 2h 35' 12"
59	Joe Dombrowski (USA)	Astana Qazaqstan Team	+ 2h 36' 33"
60	Pieter Serry (BEL)	Soudal–Quick-Step	+ 2h 36' 54"
61	Ben Swift (GBR)	INEOS Grenadiers	+ 2h 44' 27"
62	Magnus Cort (DEN)	EF Education–EasyPost	+ 2h 44' 33"
63	Michael Matthews (AUS)	Team Jayco–AlUla	+ 2h 45' 46"
64	Davide Gabburo (ITA)	Green Project–Bardiani–CSF–Faizanè	+ 2h 56' 29"
65	Andrea Pasqualon (ITA)	Team Bahrain Victorious	+ 2h 58' 04"
66	Thomas Champion (FRA)	Cofidis	+ 2h 58' 14"
67	Francesco Gavazzi (ITA)	Eolo–Kometa	+ 3h 00' 02"
68	Ryan Gibbons (RSA)	UAE Team Emirates	+ 3h 01' 25"
69	Rudy Molard (FRA)	Groupama–FDJ	+ 3h 07' 44"
70	Vincenzo Albanese (ITA)	Eolo–Kometa	+ 3h 10' 05"
71	Sebastian Berwick (AUS)	Israel–Premier Tech	+ 3h 11' 47"
72	Salvatore Puccio (ITA)	INEOS Grenadiers	+ 3h 12' 08"
73	Alex Baudin (FRA)	AG2R Citroën Team	+ 3h 17' 15"
74	Marius Mayrhofer (GER)	Team DSM	+ 3h 17' 27"
75	Jasha Sütterlin (GER)	Team Bahrain Victorious	+ 3h 20' 13"
76	Thomas Gloag (GBR)	Team Jumbo–Visma	+ 3h 22' 19"
77	Michael Hepburn (AUS)	Team Jayco–AlUla	+ 3h 25' 50"
78	Mirco Maestri (ITA)	Eolo–Kometa	+ 3h 29' 16"
79	José Joaquín Rojas (ESP)	Movistar Team	+ 3h 32' 20"
80	Maxime Bouet (FRA)	Arkéa–Samsic	+ 3h 32' 23"
81	Davide Bais (ITA)	Eolo–Kometa	+ 3h 33' 50"
82	Pascal Ackermann (GER)	UAE Team Emirates	+ 3h 38' 18"
83	Hugo Toumire (FRA)	Cofidis	+ 3h 39' 50"
84	Karel Vacek (CZE)	Team Corratec–Selle Italia	+ 3h 43' 50"
85	Kristian Sbaragli (ITA)	Alpecin–Deceuninck	+ 3h 45' 29"
86	Michel Ries (LUX)	Arkéa–Samsic	+ 3h 46' 43"
87	Henok Mulubrhan (ERI)	Green Project–Bardiani–CSF–Faizanè	+ 3h 52' 20"
88	Laurenz Rex (BEL)	Intermarché–Circus–Wanty	+ 3h 54' 23"
89	Alexandre Delettre (FRA)	Cofidis	+ 3h 55' 28"
90	Thibault Guernalec (FRA)	Arkéa–Samsic	+ 3h 56' 10"
91	Senne Leysen (BEL)	Alpecin–Deceuninck	+ 3h 58' 37"
92	Jake Stewart (GBR)	Groupama–FDJ	+ 3h 59' 18"
93	Stephen Williams (GBR)	Israel–Premier Tech	+ 3h 59' 55"
94	Edoardo Affini (ITA)	Team Jumbo–Visma	+ 4h 02' 55"
95	Lukas Pöstlberger (AUT)	Team Jayco–AlUla	+ 4h 06' 05"
96	Alex Kirsch (LUX)	Trek–Segafredo	+ 4h 11' 01"
97	Diego Pablo Sevilla (ESP)	Eolo–Kometa	+ 4h 11' 51"
98	Otto Vergaerde (BEL)	Trek–Segafredo	+ 4h 24' 51"
99	Martin Marcellusi (ITA)	Green Project–Bardiani–CSF–Faizanè	+ 4h 25' 38"
100	Alexander Konychev (ITA)	Team Corratec–Selle Italia	+ 4h 26' 35"
101	Veljko Stojnić (SRB)	Team Corratec–Selle Italia	+ 4h 26' 52"
102	Cesare Benedetti (POL)	Bora–Hansgrohe	+ 4h 28' 46"
103	Jonathan Milan (ITA)	Team Bahrain Victorious	+ 4h 29' 02"
104	Niklas Märkl (GER)	Team DSM	+ 4h 30' 49"
105	Ignatas Konovalovas (LTU)	Groupama–FDJ	+ 4h 43' 42"
106	Filippo Magli (ITA)	Green Project–Bardiani–CSF–Faizanè	+ 4h 46' 15"
107	Gianni Moscon (ITA)	Astana Qazaqstan Team	+ 4h 48' 59"
108	Campbell Stewart (NZL)	Team Jayco–AlUla	+ 4h 51' 15"
109	Daan Hoole (NED)	Trek–Segafredo	+ 4h 52' 37"
110	Max Kanter (GER)	Movistar Team	+ 4h 52' 47"
111	Simone Consonni (ITA)	Cofidis	+ 4h 56' 49"
112	Arne Marit (BEL)	Intermarché–Circus–Wanty	+ 4h 58' 01"
113	Fabian Lienhard (SUI)	Groupama–FDJ	+ 4h 59' 21"
114	Filippo Fiorelli (ITA)	Green Project–Bardiani–CSF–Faizanè	+ 5h 00' 34"
115	Charlie Quarterman (GBR)	Team Corratec–Selle Italia	+ 5h 01' 27"
116	Alan Riou (FRA)	Arkéa–Samsic	+ 5h 02' 06"
117	Jonas Iversby Hvideberg (NOR)	Team DSM	+ 5h 02' 12"
118	Fernando Gaviria (COL)	Movistar Team	+ 5h 04' 38"
119	Alessandro Iacchi (ITA)	Team Corratec–Selle Italia	+ 5h 06' 23"
120	Mark Cavendish (GBR)	Astana Qazaqstan Team	+ 5h 07' 08"
121	Alexander Krieger (GER)	Alpecin–Deceuninck	+ 5h 08' 46"
122	Albert Torres (ESP)	Movistar Team	+ 5h 19' 29"
123	Yukiya Arashiro (JPN)	Team Bahrain Victorious	+ 5h 21' 17"
124	Alberto Dainese (ITA)	Team DSM	+ 5h 23' 48"
125	Nicolas Dalla Valle (ITA)	Team Corratec–Selle Italia	+ 5h 26' 45"

=== Points classification ===
Final points classification (1–10)
Rank	Rider	Team	Points
1	Jonathan Milan (ITA)	Team Bahrain Victorious	217
2	Derek Gee (CAN)	Israel–Premier Tech	164
3	Michael Matthews (AUS)	Team Jayco–AlUla	101
4	Mark Cavendish (GBR)	Astana Qazaqstan Team	101
5	Pascal Ackermann (GER)	UAE Team Emirates	95
6	Toms Skujiņš (LAT)	Trek–Segafredo	91
7	Nico Denz (GER)	Bora–Hansgrohe	77
8	Magnus Cort (DEN)	EF Education–EasyPost	68
9	Alberto Dainese (ITA)	Team DSM	63
10	Primož Roglič (SLO)	Team Jumbo–Visma	56

=== Mountains classification ===
Final mountains classification (1–10)
Rank	Rider	Team	Points
1	Thibaut Pinot (FRA)	Groupama–FDJ	237
2	Derek Gee (CAN)	Israel–Premier Tech	200
3	Ben Healy (IRL)	EF Education–EasyPost	164
4	Davide Bais (ITA)	Eolo–Kometa	144
5	Einer Rubio (COL)	Movistar Team	117
6	Primož Roglič (SLO)	Team Jumbo–Visma	86
7	Santiago Buitrago (COL)	Team Bahrain Victorious	82
8	Davide Gabburo (ITA)	Green Project–Bardiani–CSF–Faizanè	69
9	João Almeida (POR)	UAE Team Emirates	67
10	Aurélien Paret-Peintre (FRA)	AG2R Citroën Team	56

=== Young rider classification ===
Final young rider classification (1–10)
Rank	Rider	Team	Time
1	João Almeida (POR)	UAE Team Emirates	85h 30' 17"
2	Thymen Arensman (NED)	INEOS Grenadiers	+ 4' 50"
3	Andreas Leknessund (NOR)	Team DSM	+ 6' 16"
4	Einer Rubio (COL)	Movistar Team	+ 9' 28"
5	Ilan Van Wilder (BEL)	Soudal–Quick-Step	+ 10' 43"
6	Santiago Buitrago (COL)	Team Bahrain Victorious	+ 11' 06"
7	Filippo Zana (ITA)	Team Jayco–AlUla	+ 32' 07"
8	Laurens Huys (BEL)	Intermarché–Circus–Wanty	+ 51' 03"
9	Brandon McNulty (USA)	UAE Team Emirates	+ 1h 06' 28"
10	Marco Frigo (ITA)	Israel–Premier Tech	+ 1h 23' 21"

=== Team classification ===
Final team classification (1–10)
Rank	Team	Time
1	Team Bahrain Victorious	256h 21' 18"
2	(United Kingdom) INEOS Grenadiers	+ 16' 22"
3	(Netherlands) Team Jumbo–Visma	+ 30' 40"
4	(United Arab Emirates) UAE Team Emirates	+ 51' 53"
5	(France) AG2R Citroën Team	+ 1h 21' 30"
6	(Germany) Bora–Hansgrohe	+ 1h 25' 31"
7	(Kazakhstan) Astana Qazaqstan Team	+ 1h 31' 44"
8	(Australia) Team Jayco–AlUla	+ 1h 32' 51"
9	Israel–Premier Tech	+ 1h 51' 54"
10	(United States) EF Education–EasyPost	+ 2h 18' 52"

=== Intermediate sprint classification ===
Final intermediate sprint classification (1–10)
Rank	Rider	Team	Points
1	Toms Skujiņš (LAT)	Trek–Segafredo	57
2	Derek Gee (CAN)	Israel–Premier Tech	49
3	Thomas Champion (FRA)	Cofidis	37
4	Veljko Stojnić (SRB)	Team Corratec–Selle Italia	36
5	Davide Bais (ITA)	Eolo–Kometa	32
6	Charlie Quarterman (GBR)	Team Corratec–Selle Italia	25
7	Mattia Bais (ITA)	Eolo–Kometa	24
8	Warren Barguil (FRA)	Arkéa–Samsic	19
9	Alessandro De Marchi (ITA)	Team Jayco–AlUla	19
10	Diego Pablo Sevilla (ESP)	Eolo–Kometa	19

=== Breakaway classification ===
Final breakaway classification (1–10)
Rank	Rider	Team	Kilometres
1	Thomas Champion (FRA)	Cofidis	650
2	Derek Gee (CAN)	Israel–Premier Tech	483
3	Veljko Stojnić (SRB)	Team Corratec–Selle Italia	428
4	Alexander Konychev (ITA)	Team Corratec–Selle Italia	344
5	Diego Pablo Sevilla (ESP)	Eolo–Kometa	339
6	Alessandro De Marchi (ITA)	Team Jayco–AlUla	338
7	Toms Skujiņš (LAT)	Trek–Segafredo	328
8	Davide Bais (ITA)	Eolo–Kometa	264
9	Laurenz Rex (BEL)	Intermarché–Circus–Wanty	248
10	Charlie Quarterman (GBR)	Team Corratec–Selle Italia	248

=== Fair play classification ===
Final fair play classification (1–10)
Rank	Team	Points
1	(France) Groupama–FDJ	0
2	(Belgium) Soudal–Quick-Step	0
3	(France) Arkéa–Samsic	40
4	(France) Cofidis	40
5	(Germany) Bora–Hansgrohe	50
6	(Italy) Team Corratec–Selle Italia	50
7	Team Bahrain Victorious	51
8	(United Arab Emirates) UAE Team Emirates	70
9	(Italy) Green Project–Bardiani–CSF–Faizanè	70
10	(United States) Trek–Segafredo	70

== Notes ==
Preceded by 2022 Vuelta a España	Grand Tour	Succeeded by 2023 Tour de France
