= Martin Marcellusi =

Italian cyclist (born 2000)

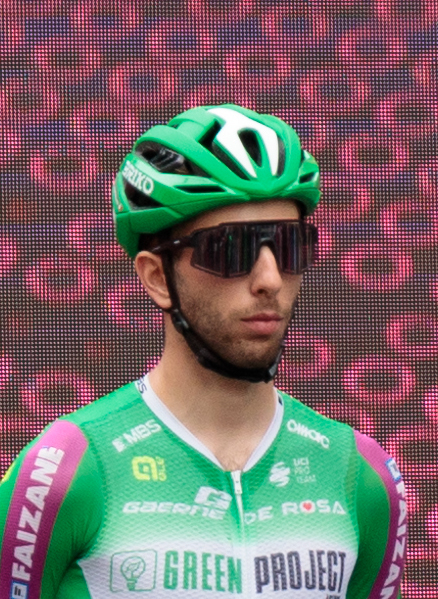
- Marcellusi at the 2023 Giro d'Italia

Personal information
- Born: 5 April 2000 (age 26) Rome, Italy
- Height: 1.72 m (5 ft 8 in)
- Weight: 62 kg (137 lb)

Cycling career
- Sport: Cycling
- Current team: Bardiani–CSF 7 Saber
- Discipline: Road
- Role: Rider

Amateur teams
- 2019: Velo Racing Palazzago
- 2020–2021: Mastromarco–Sensi–FC Nibali

Professional team
- 2022–: Bardiani–CSF–Faizanè

Martin Marcellusi (born 5 April 2000) is an Italian racing cyclist, who currently rides for UCI ProTeam Bardiani–CSF 7 Saber. He placed 10th in the 2023 Eschborn–Frankfurt, his first UCI WorldTour race, after being part of a breakaway that held off the peloton.

== Major results ==
2017
9th Overall Giro della Lunigiana
9th Gran Premio Sportivi di Sovilla
2018
2nd Gran Premio Sportivi di Sovilla
2nd Trofeo Guido Dorigo
3rd Trofeo Città di Loano
2019
1st Firenze-Empoli
2nd Trofeo Città di San Vendemiano
7th Trofeo Edil C
9th Ruota d'Oro
2021
3rd Ruota d'Oro
10th Gran Premio Sportivi di Poggiana
2022
1st Trofeo Piva
2nd Gran Premio della Liberazione
3rd GP Capodarco
4th Overall Carpathian Couriers Race
6th Trofeo Città di Meldola
7th Poreč Trophy
8th Trofeo Città di San Vendemiano
9th Il Piccolo Lombardia
2023
1st Mountains classification, Tour du Limousin
7th Gran Piemonte
10th Eschborn–Frankfurt
2024
4th Paris–Camembert
8th Milano–Torino
2025
2nd Trofeo Serra Tramuntana

=== Grand Tour general classification results timeline ===
Grand Tour	2023	2024
Giro d'Italia	98	99
Tour de France	—	—
Vuelta a España	—	—

Legend
—	Did not compete
DNF	Did not finish
