= Jonas Iversby Hvideberg =

Norwegian cyclist

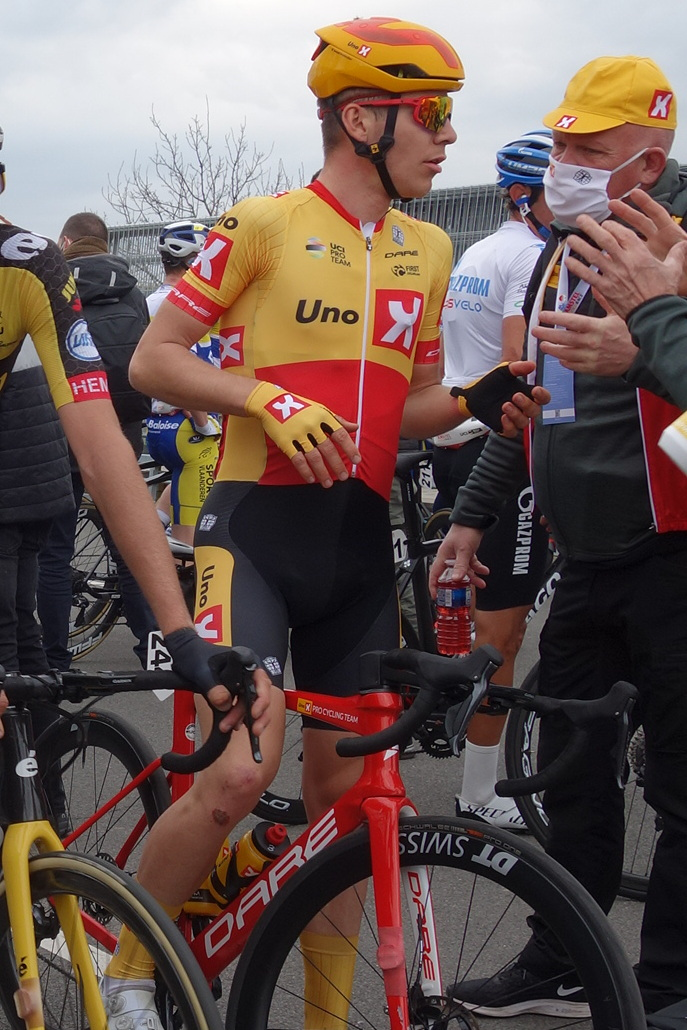
- Iversby Hvideberg in 2021

Personal information
- Born: 9 February 1999 (age 27) Rolvsøy, Norway
- Height: 1.85 m (6 ft 1 in)

Cycling career
- Sport: Cycling
- Current team: Uno-X Mobility
- Discipline: Road
- Role: Rider

Professional teams
- 2018–2021: Uno-X Norwegian Development Team
- 2022–2023: Team DSM
- 2024–2026: Uno-X Mobility
Medal record
Road cycling
Representing Norway
European Road Championships
| Gold medal – first place | 2020 Plouay | Under-23 road race |

Jonas Iversby Hvideberg (born 9 February 1999), also known as Jonas Hem Hvideberg, is a Norwegian professional road racing cyclist, who currently rides for UCI ProTeam Uno-X Mobility.

== Major results ==
2017
1st Points classification Trofeo Karlsberg
4th Overall Internationale Niedersachsen–Rundfahrt

1st Stage 1

5th Paris–Roubaix Juniors
2019
3rd Paris–Tours Espoirs
10th Paris–Roubaix Espoirs
2020
1st Road race, UEC European Under-23 Road Championships
2nd Road race, National Road Championships
5th Road race, National Under-23 Road Championships
10th UCI Esports World Championships
2021
1st Paris–Tours Espoirs
8th Boucles de l'Aulne
9th Overall Grand Prix Priessnitz spa

=== Grand Tour general classification results timeline ===
| Grand Tour | 2022 | 2023 |
|---|---|---|
| Giro d'Italia | — | 117 |
| Tour de France | — | — |
| Vuelta a España | 110 | |

Legend
| — | Did not compete |
| DNF | Did not finish |
