= Hugo Toumire =

French cyclist

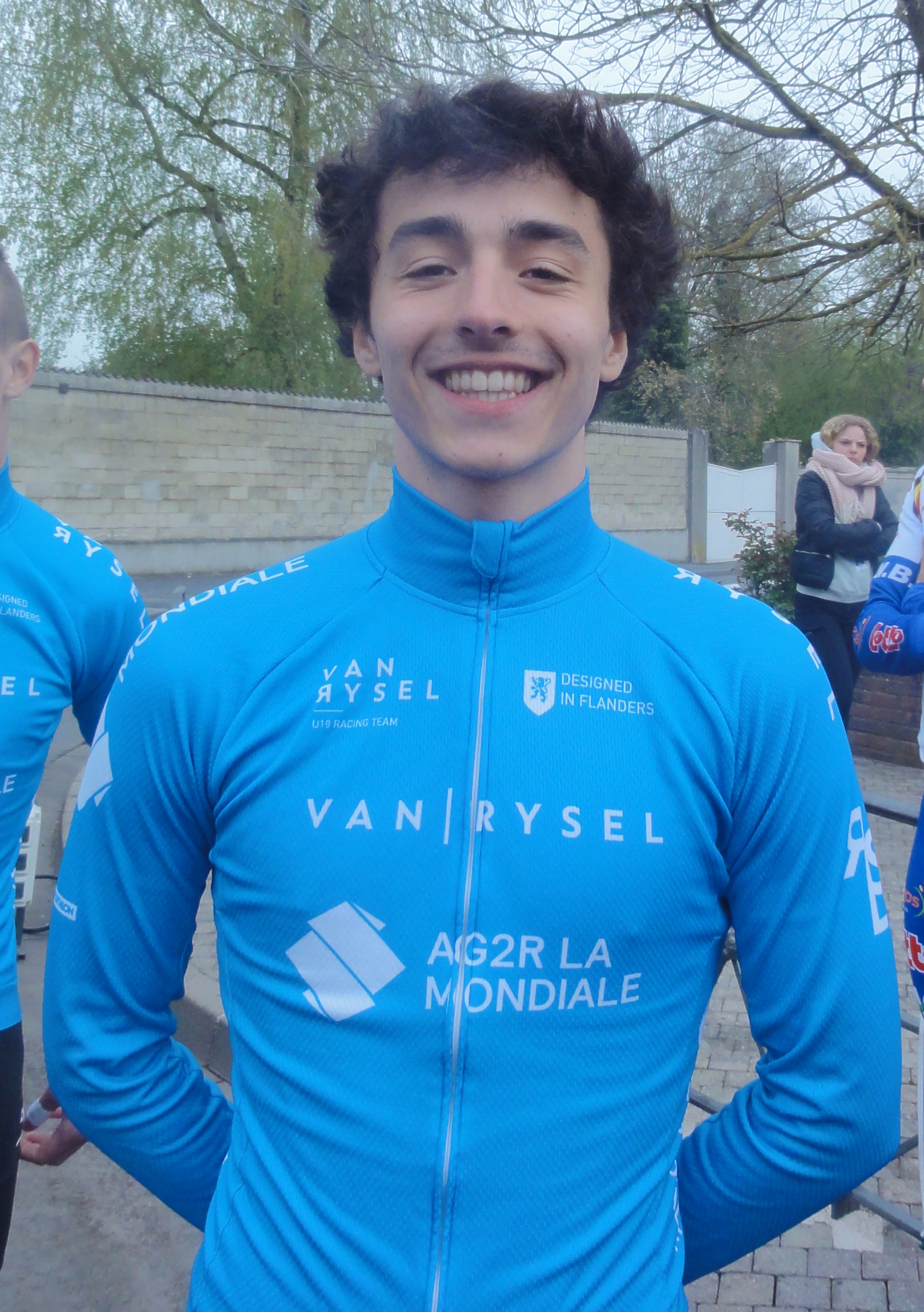
- Toumire at the 2019

Personal information
- Born: 5 October 2001 (age 25) Rouen, France
- Height: 1.80 m (5 ft 11 in)
- Weight: 69 kg (152 lb)

Cycling career
- Sport: Cycling
- Discipline: Road
- Role: Rider

Amateur teams
- 2014–2019: VC Catenay
- 2020: Chambéry CF
- 2021: VC Rouen 76

Professional teams
- 2021: Cofidis (stagiaire)
- 2022–2025: Cofidis

Hugo Toumire (born 5 October 2001) is a French former professional racing cyclist, who last rode for UCI WorldTeam Cofidis.

After announcing his retirement due to iliac artery problems, he began working for the French Anti-Doping Agency (AFLD).

== Major results ==
2018
1st Trophée Louison-Bobet
Aubel–Thimister–Stavelot

1st Young rider classification
1st Stage 2a (TTT)

4th Overall Tour des Portes du Pays d'Othe

1st Stage 2 (TTT)

6th Time Trial, National Junior Road Championships
6th Chrono des Nations Juniors
2019
1st Overall Course de la Paix Juniors

1st Stage 1

2nd Time trial, National Junior Road Championships
2nd Paris–Roubaix Juniors
2nd GP Général Patton
4th Chrono des Nations Juniors
7th Overall SPIE Internationale Juniorendriedaagse
2021
5th Overall Tour de l'Avenir
5th Overall Tour de Savoie Mont-Blanc

=== Grand Tour general classification results timeline ===
Grand Tour	2023
Giro d'Italia	83
Tour de France	
Vuelta a España	
