= Charlie Quarterman =

British cyclist (born 1998)

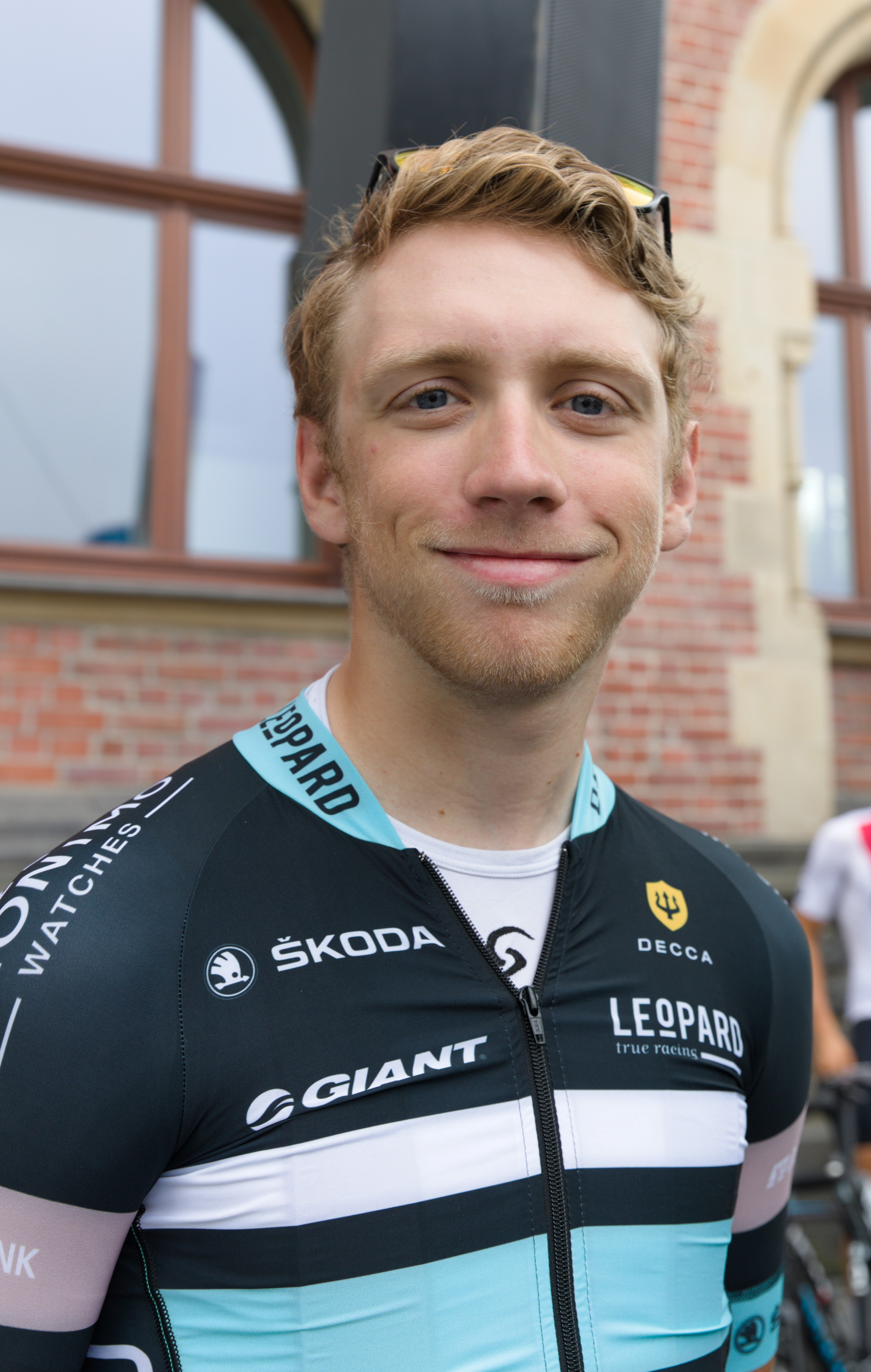
- Quarterman in 2018.

Personal information
- Full name: Charles Baxter Quarterman
- Nickname: Charlie
- Born: 6 September 1998 (age 28) Oxford, England
- Height: 1.8 m (5 ft 11 in)
- Weight: 75 kg (165 lb; 11 st 11 lb)

Cycling career
- Sport: Cycling
- Discipline: Road
- Role: Rider

Amateur teams
- 2019: Holdsworth–Zappi
- 2022: Philippe Wagner Cycling

Professional teams
- 2017–2018: Leopard Pro Cycling
- 2019: Trek–Segafredo (stagiaire)
- 2020–2021: Trek–Segafredo
- 2023: Team Corratec–Selle Italia

Charles Baxter Quarterman (born 6 September 1998) is a British former professional cyclist, who competed from 2017 to 2023. After retiring as a professional, he started working for sports equipment manufacturer Salomon.

== Career ==
For the 2017 season he joined the Luxembourg-based team Leopard Pro Cycling.

He won the Under-23 British National Time Trial Championships in 2019.

In August 2019, Quarterman joined UCI WorldTeam Trek–Segafredo as a stagiaire for the second half of the season, before joining the team permanently in 2020.

== Personal ==
Quarterman was educated at the Abingdon School from 2010 to 2017 and is now based near Annecy, France.

== Major results ==
2016
1st Mountains classification, Junior Tour of Wales
3rd Overall Giro di Basilicata
5th Omloop der Vlaamse Gewesten
6th Grand Prix Bati-Metallo
2018
2nd Time trial, National Under-23 Road Championships
2019
1st Time trial, National Under-23 Road Championships
2022
5th Time trial, National Road Championships
7th Overall Tour de Normandie

=== Grand Tour general classification results timeline ===
Grand Tour	2023
Giro d'Italia	115
Tour de France	—
Vuelta a España	—

== See also ==
- List of Old Abingdonians
