= Thomas Champion (cyclist) =

French bicycle racer

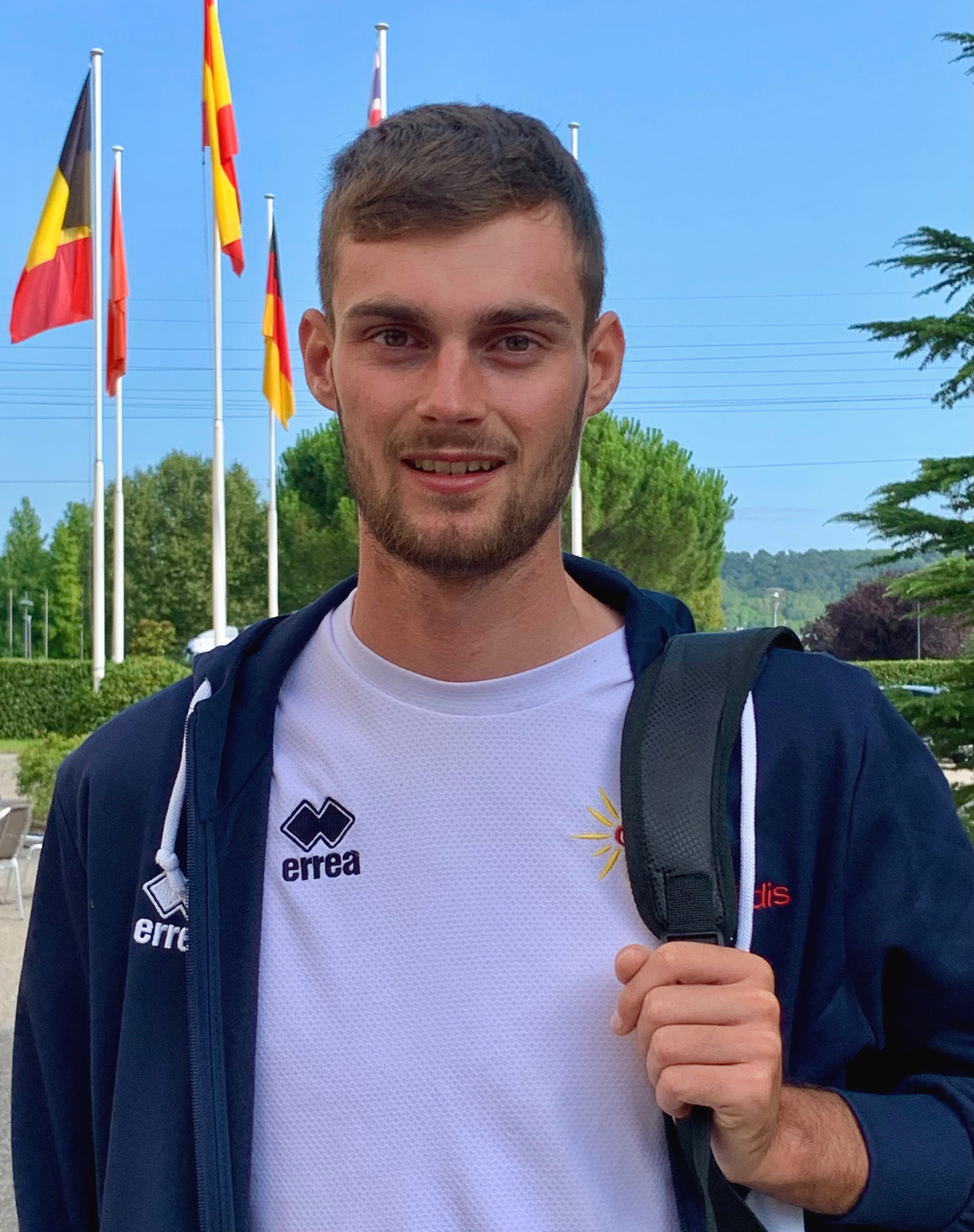

Personal information
- Born: 8 September 1999 (age 27) Saint-Sébastien-sur-Loire, France

Cycling career
- Sport: Cycling
- Current team: St. Michel–Preference Home–Auber93
- Disciplines: Road; Mountain biking
- Role: Rider

Amateur teams
- 2005–2016: VS Clissonnais
- 2017: VS Valletais
- 2018–2019: Vendée U
- 2020: Bourg-en-Bresse Ain

Professional teams
- 2021–2024: Cofidis
- 2025–: St. Michel–Preference Home–Auber93

Thomas Champion (born 8 September 1999) is a French cyclist, who currently rides for UCI Continental team St. Michel–Preference Home–Auber93.

== Career ==
Champion began cycling at the age of 6 with the VS Clissonnais club, and competed primarily in mountain biking as a junior. In 2016, he began to also compete in road cycling, finishing 8th in the La Philippe Gilbert Juniors.

In 2021, Champion joined UCI WorldTeam Cofidis on a two-year contract.

== Major results ==
2016
8th La Philippe Gilbert Juniors
2017
4th Overall Ain Bugey Valromey Tour
2020
3rd Marathon, National MTB Championships
4th Overall Le Tour de Savoie Mont Blanc
9th Overall Ronde de l'Isard
2023
Giro d'Italia

1st Breakway classification
Combativity award Stage 17

2025
5th Overall Tour Alsace
9th Overall Étoile de Bessèges
10th Overall Tour du Limousin
2026
9th Overall Tour du Limousin
9th Classic Grand Besançon Doubs

=== Grand Tour general classification results timeline ===
Grand Tour	2022	2023	2024
Giro d'Italia	—	66	55
Tour de France	—	—	—
Vuelta a España	98	—	98

Legend
—	Did not compete
DNF	Did not finish
