= Alessandro Iacchi =

Italian cyclist

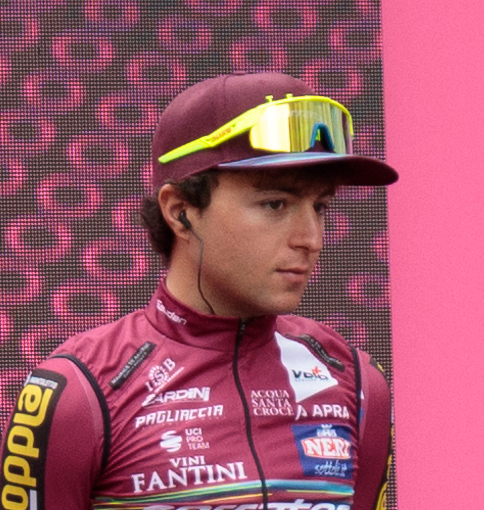
- Iacchi at the 2023 Giro d'Italia

Personal information
- Born: 26 May 1999 (age 27) Borgo San Lorenzo, Italy
- Height: 1.70 m (5 ft 7 in)
- Weight: 59 kg (130 lb)

Cycling career
- Sport: Cycling
- Current team: Solution Tech NIPPO Rali
- Discipline: Road
- Role: Rider

Amateur teams
- 2012–2013: Aquila Ganzaroli
- 2014–2017: F. Bessi Calenzano
- 2018: Petroli Firenze Hoppla Maserati
- 2018: Team Cervelo
- 2019: Team Franco Ballerini

Professional teams
- 2019: Neri Sottoli–Selle Italia–KTM (stagiaire)
- 2020–2021: Vini Zabù–KTM
- 2022: Team Qhubeka
- 2023–: Team Corratec

Alessandro Iacchi (born 26 May 1999) is an Italian racing cyclist, who currently rides for UCI ProTeam Solution Tech NIPPO Rali.

== Major results ==
2018
10th Ruota d'Oro
2022
3rd Giro del Casentino
9th Overall Tour of Britain

=== Grand Tour general classification results timeline ===
Grand Tour	2023
Giro d'Italia	119
Tour de France	—
Vuelta a España	—
