= Le Châble =

Coordinates: 46°05′N 7°12′E

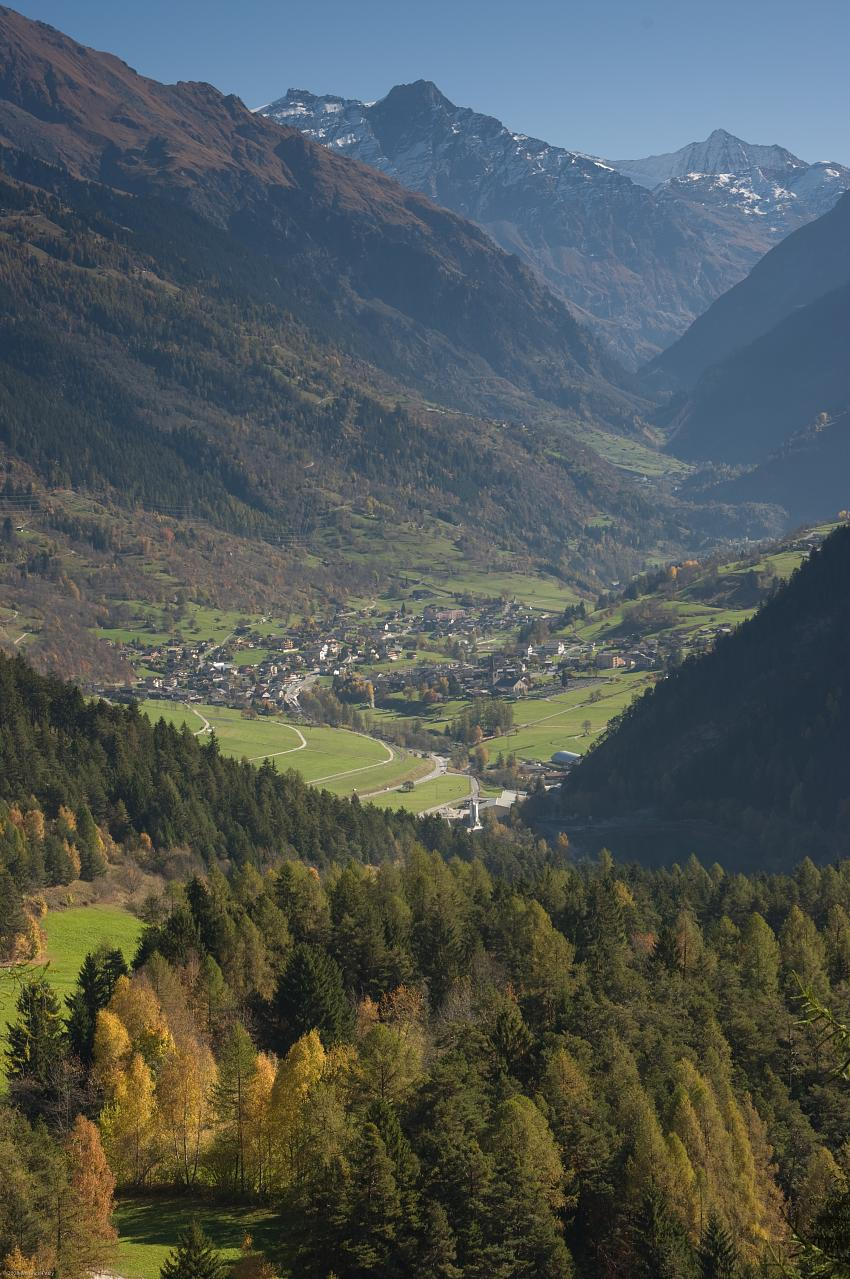
Le Châble.

Le Châble is a village in Val de Bagnes, Valais, Switzerland, below the ski resort of Verbier.

The local St. Bernard Express Train runs from Martigny and finishes in Le Châble. This service is regularly used by tourists from Geneva airport en route to Verbier. Since 1984, Le Châble has had a sister village relationship with Mishicot, Wisconsin.

== Transport ==
A four-person gondola is situated next to the Le Châble VS railway station for easy access to Verbier and the ski slopes above. A bus service also runs from the train station to Verbier and to Bruson, on the opposite side of the valley, which offers access to a smaller, quieter, ski area. The main road link to Verbier also runs through Le Châble.

== Mardi Gras ==
Each year, around February, the local Mardi Gras parade passes through Le Châble and finishes in the town square which is an occasion where the villages and businesses in the valley come together develop floats and costumes along a common theme. There are a number of brass bands in the region and these usually join in the parade and take part in an informal competition in the town square afterwards, performing for the general public.

Verbier also runs themed events based around the Mardi Gras but these are aimed at tourists rather than local residents.
