= Marco Frigo =

Italian road racing cyclist (born 2000)

Personal information
- Born: 26 July 2000 (age 26) Bassano del Grappa, Italy
- Height: 1.88 m (6 ft 2 in)
- Weight: 65 kg (143 lb)

Cycling career
- Sport: Cycling
- Current team: NSN Cycling Team
- Discipline: Road
- Role: Rider
- Rider type: Climber

Amateur teams
- 2017–2018: Danieli 1914 Bassano
- 2019: Zalf–Euromobil–Désirée–Fior

Professional teams
- 2020–2021: SEG Racing Academy
- 2022: Israel Cycling Academy
- 2023–: Israel–Premier Tech
Medal record
Men's road bicycle racing
Representing Italy
European Championships
Silver medal – second place	2025 Guilherand-Granges	Mixed team relay

Marco Frigo (born 2 March 2000) is an Italian cyclist, who currently rides for UCI ProTeam NSN Cycling Team.

== Major results ==
2018
2nd Overall Giro del Nordest d'Italia
3rd Gran Premio Sportivi di Sovilla
5th Trofeo Buffoni
5th Giro della Lunigiana
6th Trofeo Citta di Loano
2019
1st Road race, National Under-23 Road Championships
2nd Trofeo Alcide Degasperi
2021
1st Stage 1 Ronde de l'Isard
2nd Time trial, National Under-23 Road Championships
6th Overall Flanders Tomorrow Tour
2022
1st Stage 4 Circuit des Ardennes
2nd Trofeo Piva
4th Overall Giro della Valle d'Aosta
9th Overall Alpes Isère Tour
2025 (1 pro win)
1st Stage 3 Tour of the Alps
5th Time trial, National Road Championships
5th Overall Tour of Belgium
7th Overall Tour de Pologne
2026
7th Time trial, UEC European Road Championships
10th Amstel Gold Race

=== Grand Tour general classification results timeline ===
Grand Tour	2023	2024	2025
Giro d'Italia	32	44	28
Tour de France	—	—	
Vuelta a España	—	53	

Legend
—	Did not compete
DNF	Did not finish
