= Karel Vacek =

Czech cyclist

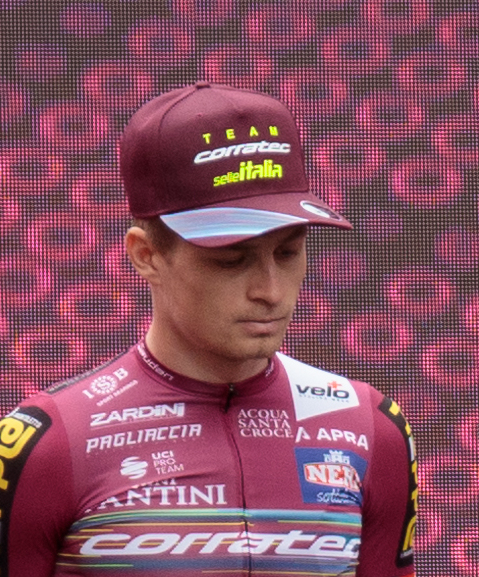
- Vacek at the 2023 Giro d'Italia

Personal information
- Full name: Karel Vacek
- Born: 9 September 2000 (age 26) Prague, Czech Republic
- Height: 1.78 m (5 ft 10 in)
- Weight: 60 kg (132 lb)

Cycling career
- Sport: Cycling
- Discipline: Road
- Role: Rider

Amateur team
- 2017–2018: Team F.lli Giorgi

Professional teams
- 2019: Hagens Berman Axeon
- 2020: Team Colpack–Ballan
- 2021: Team Qhubeka Assos
- 2022: Tirol KTM Cycling Team
- 2023: Team Corratec
- 2024: Burgos BH

Karel Vacek (born 9 September 2000) is a Czech racing cyclist, who last rode for UCI ProTeam Burgos BH. His younger brother Mathias is also a cyclist.

== Major results ==
2017
2nd Montichiari–Roncone
4th Overall Course de la Paix Juniors

1st Young rider classification
1st Stage 3

2018
National Junior Road Championships

1st Time trial
2nd Road race

Giro della Lunigiana

1st Stage 1b (ITT) & Stage 3

1st Trofeo Citta di Loano
2nd Saarland Trofeo
3rd Trofeo Emilio Paganessi
4th G.P. Sportivi Sovilla-La Piccola Sanremo
5th Overall Tour du Pays de Vaud
5th Road race, UEC European Junior Road Championships
8th Overall Course de la Paix Juniors

1st Stage 3

2022
7th Overall Grand Prix Jeseníky
2024
7th Overall Troféu Joaquim Agostinho

=== Grand Tour general classification results timeline ===
Grand Tour	2023
Giro d'Italia	84
Tour de France	—
Vuelta a España	—

Legend
—	Did not compete
DNF	Did not finish
