= Laurens De Plus =

Belgian cyclist

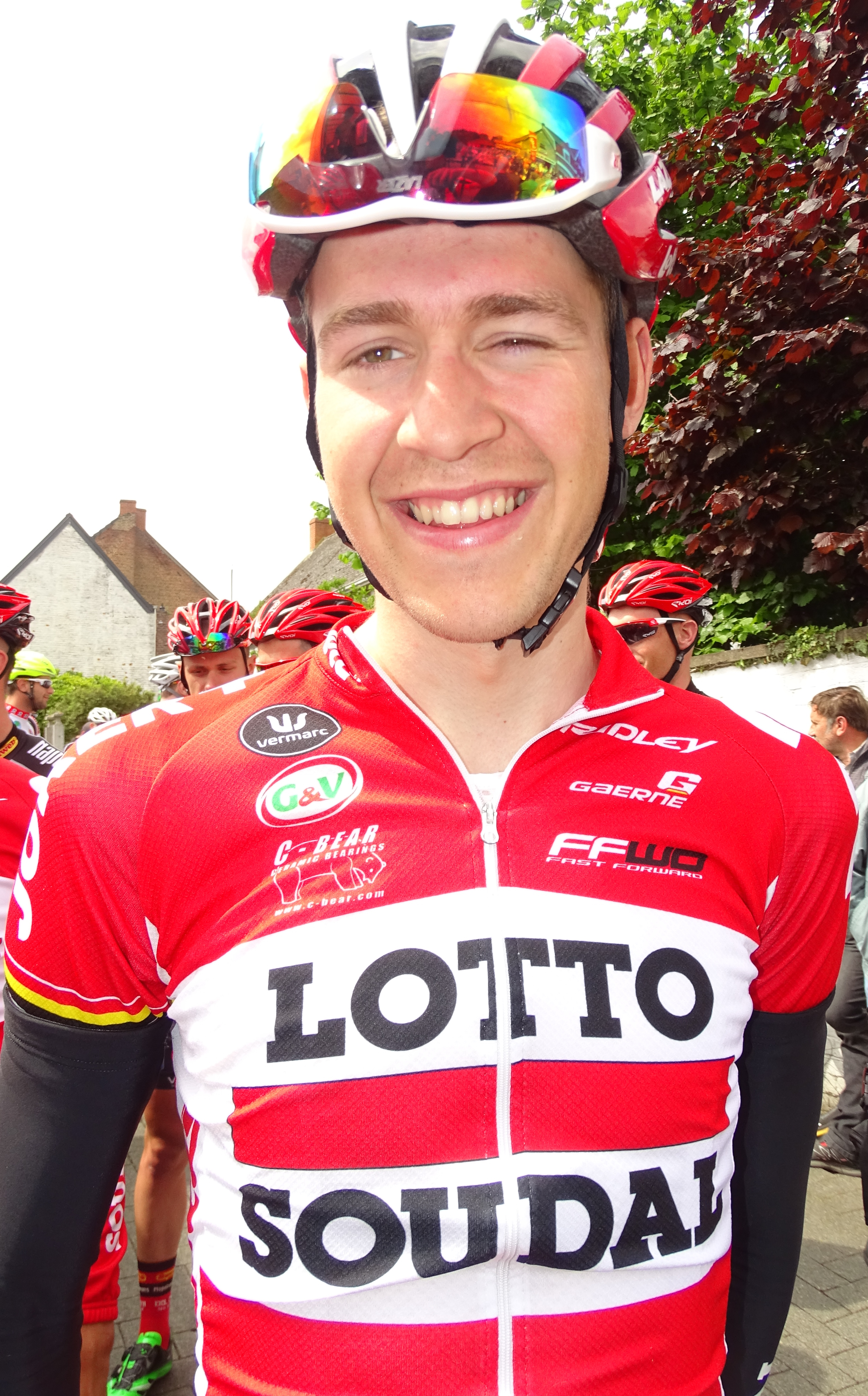
- De Plus in 2015

Personal information
- Nickname: Pluske
- Born: 4 September 1995 (age 31) Aalst, Flanders, Belgium
- Height: 1.89 m (6 ft 2 1/2 in)
- Weight: 67 kg (148 lb; 10 st 8 lb)

Cycling career
- Sport: Cycling
- Current team: Netcompany–Ineos
- Discipline: Road
- Role: Rider
- Rider type: Climber

Amateur team
- 2014–2015: Lotto–Belisol U23

Professional teams
- 2016–2018: Etixx–Quick-Step
- 2019–2020: Team Jumbo–Visma
- 2021–: INEOS Grenadiers

Major wins
- Grand Tours Tour de France 1 TTT stage (2019) Stage races BinckBank Tour (2019)

Laurens De Plus (born 4 September 1995) is a Belgian cyclist, who currently rides for UCI WorldTeam Netcompany–Ineos. He was named in the start list for the 2017 Giro d'Italia, and in the startlist for the 2019 Tour de France. He is the older brother of fellow racing cyclist Jasper De Plus.

== Major results ==
2013
5th Overall Ain'Ternational–Rhône Alpes–Valromey Tour
7th La Philippe Gilbert juniors
8th Overall Giro della Lunigiana
2015
1st Ghent–Staden
2nd Overall Ronde de l'Isard

1st Points classification
1st Young rider classification

2nd Overall Giro della Valle d'Aosta

1st Points classification
1st Stage 1

4th Overall Grand Prix Priessnitz spa
4th Coppa dei Laghi-Trofeo Almar
5th Flèche Ardennaise
6th Overall Tour Alsace
8th Overall Tour de l'Avenir
2017
3rd Overall Ster ZLM Toer
10th Brabantse Pijl
2018
1st Team time trial, UCI Road World Championships
4th Time trial, National Road Championships
8th Overall Tour of California
2019
1st Overall BinckBank Tour
1st Stage 2 (TTT) Tour de France
9th Overall UAE Tour

1st Stage 1 (TTT)

2021
10th GP Miguel Induráin
2023
10th Overall Giro d'Italia
2024
5th Overall Critérium du Dauphiné
2025
3rd Overall Volta ao Algarve
6th Overall Volta a Catalunya

=== General classification results timeline ===
Grand Tour general classification results
Grand Tour	2016	2017	2018	2019	2020	2021	2022	2023	2024	2025
Giro d'Italia	—	24	—	DNF	—	—	—	10	—	
Tour de France	—	—	—	23	—	—	—	—	15	
Vuelta a España	—	—	DNF	—	—	—	—	DNF	DNF	
Major stage race general classification results
Race	2016	2017	2018	2019	2020	2021	2022	2023	2024	2025
Paris–Nice	—	—	—	—	—	46	—	—	13	—
Tirreno–Adriatico	—	—	—	65	—	—	—	DNF	—	46
Volta a Catalunya	50	26	—	—	NH	—	—	—	16	6
Tour of the Basque Country	25	—	—	—	NH	—	DNF	—	—	
Tour de Romandie	—	—	—	—	NH	—	84	—	—	
Critérium du Dauphiné	31	—	DNF	—	—	—	67	—	5	
Tour de Suisse	—	—	—	—	NH	—	—	—	—	

Legend
—	Did not compete
DNF	Did not finish
