= 2021 Vuelta a Burgos =

Men's road cycling stage race

2021 UCI Europe Tour 2021 UCI ProSeries

Race details
- Dates: 3 – 7 August 2021
- Stages: 5
- Distance: 804 km (499.6 mi)
- Winning time: 18h 30' 00"

Results
Jersey awarded to the overall winner	Winner	Mikel Landa (ESP)	(Team Bahrain Victorious)
	Second	Fabio Aru (ITA)	(Team Qhubeka NextHash)
	Third	Mark Padun (UKR)	(Team Bahrain Victorious)
Jersey awarded to the points classification winner	Points	Juan Sebastián Molano (COL)	(UAE Team Emirates)
Jersey awarded to the mountains classification winner	Mountains	Romain Bardet (FRA)	(Team DSM)
Jersey awarded to the youth classification winner	Youth	Einer Rubio (COL)	(Movistar Team)
	Team	Team Bahrain Victorious	

The 2021 Vuelta a Burgos was a men's road cycling stage race that took place from 3 to 7 August 2021 in the Spanish province of Burgos. It was the 43rd edition of the Vuelta a Burgos, and was rated as a 2.Pro event as part of the 2021 UCI Europe Tour and the 2021 UCI ProSeries calendars.

== Teams ==
Thirteen of the nineteen UCI WorldTeams are joined by eight UCI ProTeams to make up the twenty-one teams that participated in the race. Bora–Hansgrohe and UAE Team Emirates, with six riders each, were the only teams not to enter a full squad of seven riders; in total, 146 riders started the race. 127 riders finished.

UCI WorldTeams

- AG2R Citroën Team
- Astana–Premier Tech
- Bora–Hansgrohe
- EF Education–Nippo
- Groupama–FDJ
- Ineos Grenadiers
- Israel Start-Up Nation
- Movistar Team
- Team Bahrain Victorious
- Team BikeExchange
- Team DSM
- Team Qhubeka NextHash
- UAE Team Emirates

UCI ProTeams

- Alpecin–Fenix
- Arkéa–Samsic
- Burgos BH
- Caja Rural–Seguros RGA
- Eolo–Kometa
- Equipo Kern Pharma
- Euskaltel–Euskadi
- Team TotalEnergies

== Route ==
Stage characteristics and winners
Stage	Date	Course	Distance	Type	Stage winner
1	3 August	Burgos (Catedral) to Burgos (El Castillo)	161 km (100 mi)	Hilly stage	Edward Planckaert (BEL)
2	4 August	Tardajos to Briviesca	175 km (109 mi)	Flat stage	Juan Sebastián Molano (COL)
3	5 August	Busto de Bureba to Espinosa de los Monteros	173 km (107 mi)	Mountain stage	Romain Bardet (FRA)
4	6 August	Roa to Aranda de Duero	149 km (93 mi)	Flat stage	Juan Sebastián Molano (COL)
5	7 August	Comunero de Revenga to Lagunas de Neila	146 km (91 mi)	Mountain stage	Hugh Carthy (GBR)
Total			804 km (500 mi)		

== Stages ==
=== Stage 1 ===
3 August 2021 – Burgos (Catedral) to Burgos (El Castillo), 161 km (100 mi)

Stage 1 Result
Rank	Rider	Team	Time
1	Edward Planckaert (BEL)	Alpecin–Fenix	3h 34' 42"
2	Gonzalo Serrano (ESP)	Movistar Team	+ 0"
3	Vincenzo Albanese (ITA)	Eolo–Kometa	+ 1"
4	Santiago Buitrago (COL)	Team Bahrain Victorious	+ 1"
5	Romain Bardet (FRA)	Team DSM	+ 3"
6	Robert Stannard (AUS)	Team BikeExchange	+ 9"
7	Miguel Flórez (COL)	Arkéa–Samsic	+ 9"
8	Jetse Bol (NED)	Burgos BH	+ 9"
9	Mikel Landa (ESP)	Team Bahrain Victorious	+ 9"
10	Kévin Ledanois (FRA)	Arkéa–Samsic	+ 9"

General classification after Stage 1
Rank	Rider	Team	Time
1	Edward Planckaert (BEL)	Alpecin–Fenix	3h 34' 42"
2	Gonzalo Serrano (ESP)	Movistar Team	+ 0"
3	Vincenzo Albanese (ITA)	Eolo–Kometa	+ 1"
4	Santiago Buitrago (COL)	Team Bahrain Victorious	+ 1"
5	Romain Bardet (FRA)	Team DSM	+ 3"
6	Robert Stannard (AUS)	Team BikeExchange	+ 9"
7	Miguel Flórez (COL)	Arkéa–Samsic	+ 9"
8	Jetse Bol (NED)	Burgos BH	+ 9"
9	Mikel Landa (ESP)	Team Bahrain Victorious	+ 9"
10	Kévin Ledanois (FRA)	Arkéa–Samsic	+ 9"

=== Stage 2 ===
4 August 2021 – Tardajos to Briviesca, 175 km (109 mi)

Stage 2 Result
Rank	Rider	Team	Time
1	Juan Sebastián Molano (COL)	UAE Team Emirates	3h 55' 39"
2	Alberto Dainese (ITA)	Team DSM	+ 0"
3	Matteo Trentin (ITA)	UAE Team Emirates	+ 0"
4	Jordi Meeus (BEL)	Bora–Hansgrohe	+ 0"
5	Jon Aberasturi (ESP)	Caja Rural–Seguros RGA	+ 0"
6	Reinardt Janse van Rensburg (RSA)	Team Qhubeka NextHash	+ 0"
7	Itamar Einhorn (ISR)	Israel Start-Up Nation	+ 0"
8	Chris Lawless (GBR)	Team TotalEnergies	+ 0"
9	Marc Sarreau (FRA)	AG2R Citroën Team	+ 0"
10	Gonzalo Serrano (ESP)	Movistar Team	+ 0"

General classification after Stage 2
Rank	Rider	Team	Time
1	Gonzalo Serrano (ESP)	Movistar Team	7h 30' 21"
2	Edward Planckaert (BEL)	Alpecin–Fenix	+ 0"
3	Vincenzo Albanese (ITA)	Eolo–Kometa	+ 1"
4	Santiago Buitrago (COL)	Team Bahrain Victorious	+ 1"
5	Romain Bardet (FRA)	Team DSM	+ 3"
6	Robert Stannard (AUS)	Team BikeExchange	+ 9"
7	Jetse Bol (NED)	Burgos BH	+ 9"
8	Mikel Landa (ESP)	Team Bahrain Victorious	+ 9"
9	Miguel Flórez (COL)	Arkéa–Samsic	+ 9"
10	Jonathan Lastra (ESP)	Caja Rural–Seguros RGA	+ 9"

=== Stage 3 ===
5 August 2021 – Busto de Bureba to Espinosa de los Monteros, 173 km (107 mi)

Stage 3 Result
Rank	Rider	Team	Time
1	Romain Bardet (FRA)	Team DSM	4h 14' 14"
2	Domenico Pozzovivo (ITA)	Team Qhubeka NextHash	+ 39"
3	Mikel Landa (ESP)	Team Bahrain Victorious	+ 39"
4	Mikel Nieve (ESP)	Team BikeExchange	+ 39"
5	Tobias Bayer (AUT)	Alpecin–Fenix	+ 50"
6	Mark Padun (UKR)	Team Bahrain Victorious	+ 50"
7	Fabio Aru (ITA)	Team Qhubeka NextHash	+ 50"
8	Aleksandr Vlasov (RUS)	Astana–Premier Tech	+ 50"
9	David de la Cruz (ESP)	UAE Team Emirates	+ 50"
10	Óscar Rodríguez (ESP)	Astana–Premier Tech	+ 50"

General classification after Stage 3
Rank	Rider	Team	Time
1	Romain Bardet (FRA)	Team DSM	11h 44' 38"
2	Mikel Landa (ESP)	Team Bahrain Victorious	+ 45"
3	Domenico Pozzovivo (ITA)	Team Qhubeka NextHash	+ 58"
4	Fabio Aru (ITA)	Team Qhubeka NextHash	+ 1' 00"
5	David de la Cruz (ESP)	UAE Team Emirates	+ 1' 00"
6	Geoffrey Bouchard (FRA)	AG2R Citroën Team	+ 1' 00"
7	Mark Padun (UKR)	Team Bahrain Victorious	+ 1' 05"
8	Pavel Sivakov (RUS)	Ineos Grenadiers	+ 1' 07"
9	Santiago Buitrago (COL)	Team Bahrain Victorious	+ 1' 33"
10	Jaakko Hänninen (FIN)	AG2R Citroën Team	+ 1' 45"

=== Stage 4 ===
6 August 2021 – Roa to Aranda de Duero, 149 km (93 mi)

Stage 4 Result
Rank	Rider	Team	Time
1	Juan Sebastián Molano (COL)	UAE Team Emirates	3h 20' 28"
2	Jon Aberasturi (ESP)	Caja Rural–Seguros RGA	+ 0"
3	Vincenzo Albanese (ITA)	Eolo–Kometa	+ 0"
4	Matteo Trentin (ITA)	UAE Team Emirates	+ 0"
5	Jordi Meeus (BEL)	Bora–Hansgrohe	+ 0"
6	Marc Sarreau (FRA)	AG2R Citroën Team	+ 0"
7	Sacha Modolo (ITA)	Alpecin–Fenix	+ 0"
8	Gonzalo Serrano (ESP)	Movistar Team	+ 0"
9	Itamar Einhorn (ISR)	Israel Start-Up Nation	+ 0"
10	José Joaquín Rojas (ESP)	Movistar Team	+ 0"

General classification after Stage 4
Rank	Rider	Team	Time
1	Romain Bardet (FRA)	Team DSM	15h 05' 06"
2	Mikel Landa (ESP)	Team Bahrain Victorious	+ 45"
3	David de la Cruz (ESP)	UAE Team Emirates	+ 1' 00"
4	Fabio Aru (ITA)	Team Qhubeka NextHash	+ 1' 00"
5	Mark Padun (UKR)	Team Bahrain Victorious	+ 1' 05"
6	Pavel Sivakov (RUS)	Ineos Grenadiers	+ 1' 07"
7	Geoffrey Bouchard (FRA)	AG2R Citroën Team	+ 1' 08"
8	Domenico Pozzovivo (ITA)	Team Qhubeka NextHash	+ 1' 18"
9	Santiago Buitrago (COL)	Team Bahrain Victorious	+ 1' 41"
10	Jaakko Hänninen (FIN)	AG2R Citroën Team	+ 1' 53"

=== Stage 5 ===
7 August 2021 – Comunero de Revenga to Lagunas de Neila, 146 km (91 mi)

Stage 5 Result
Rank	Rider	Team	Time
1	Hugh Carthy (GBR)	EF Education–Nippo	3h 23' 53"
2	Einer Rubio (COL)	Movistar Team	+ 5"
3	Simon Yates (GBR)	Team BikeExchange	+ 7"
4	Egan Bernal (COL)	Ineos Grenadiers	+ 13"
5	Jay Vine (AUS)	Alpecin–Fenix	+ 14"
6	Mikel Landa (ESP)	Team Bahrain Victorious	+ 16"
7	Santiago Buitrago (COL)	Team Bahrain Victorious	+ 29"
8	Fabio Aru (ITA)	Team Qhubeka NextHash	+ 37"
9	Mark Padun (UKR)	Team Bahrain Victorious	+ 39"
10	Mikel Bizkarra (ESP)	Euskaltel–Euskadi	+ 43"

General classification after Stage 5
Rank	Rider	Team	Time
1	Mikel Landa (ESP)	Team Bahrain Victorious	18h 30' 00"
2	Fabio Aru (ITA)	Team Qhubeka NextHash	+ 36"
3	Mark Padun (UKR)	Team Bahrain Victorious	+ 43"
4	Pavel Sivakov (RUS)	Ineos Grenadiers	+ 49"
5	David de la Cruz (ESP)	UAE Team Emirates	+ 51"
6	Romain Bardet (FRA)	Team DSM	+ 53"
7	Einer Rubio (COL)	Movistar Team	+ 58"
8	Santiago Buitrago (COL)	Team Bahrain Victorious	+ 1' 09"
9	Geoffrey Bouchard (FRA)	AG2R Citroën Team	+ 1' 21"
10	Sébastien Reichenbach (SUI)	Groupama–FDJ	+ 1' 39"

== Classification leadership table ==
Classification leadership by stage
Stage	Winner	General classification	Points classification	Mountains classification	Young rider classification	Spanish rider classification	Team classification	Combativity award
1	Edward Planckaert	Edward Planckaert	Edward Planckaert	Edward Planckaert	Santiago Buitrago	Gonzalo Serrano	Team Bahrain Victorious	Sep Vanmarcke
2	Juan Sebastián Molano	Gonzalo Serrano	Edward Planckaert	Edward Planckaert	Santiago Buitrago	Gonzalo Serrano	Team Bahrain Victorious	Carlos Canal
3	Romain Bardet	Romain Bardet	Romain Bardet	Romain Bardet	Santiago Buitrago	Mikel Landa	Team Bahrain Victorious	Oier Lazkano
4	Juan Sebastián Molano	Romain Bardet	Juan Sebastián Molano	Romain Bardet	Santiago Buitrago	Mikel Landa	Team Bahrain Victorious	Diego Rubio
5	Hugh Carthy	Mikel Landa	Juan Sebastián Molano	Romain Bardet	Einer Rubio	Mikel Landa	Team Bahrain Victorious	Mikel Bizkarra
Final		Mikel Landa	Juan Sebastián Molano	Romain Bardet	Einer Rubio	Mikel Landa	Team Bahrain Victorious	Not awarded

- On stage 2, Vincenzo Albanese, who was second in the points classification, wore the green jersey, because first-placed Edward Planckaert wore the violet jersey as the leader of the general classification. For the same reason, Johan Jacobs, who was second in the mountains classification, wore the red jersey.
- On stage 3, Johan Jacobs, who remained in second in the mountains classification, continued to wear the red jersey, but first-placed Edward Planckaert now wore the green jersey as the leader of the points classification.
- On stage 4, Edward Planckaert, who was second in the points classification, wore the green jersey, because first-placed Romain Bardet wore the violet jersey as the leader of the general classification. For the same reason, Geoffrey Bouchard, who was second in the mountains classification, wore the red jersey on stages 4 and 5.

== Final classification standings ==
Legend
Denotes the winner of the general classification	Denotes the winner of the mountains classification
Denotes the winner of the points classification	Denotes the winner of the young rider classification

=== General classification ===
Final general classification (1–10)
Rank	Rider	Team	Time
1	Mikel Landa (ESP)	Team Bahrain Victorious	18h 30' 00"
2	Fabio Aru (ITA)	Team Qhubeka NextHash	+ 36"
3	Mark Padun (UKR)	Team Bahrain Victorious	+ 43"
4	Pavel Sivakov (RUS)	Ineos Grenadiers	+ 49"
5	David de la Cruz (ESP)	UAE Team Emirates	+ 51"
6	Romain Bardet (FRA)	Team DSM	+ 53"
7	Einer Rubio (COL)	Movistar Team	+ 58"
8	Santiago Buitrago (COL)	Team Bahrain Victorious	+ 1' 09"
9	Geoffrey Bouchard (FRA)	AG2R Citroën Team	+ 1' 21"
10	Sébastien Reichenbach (SUI)	Groupama–FDJ	+ 1' 39"

=== Points classification ===
Final points classification (1–10)
Rank	Rider	Team	Points
1	Juan Sebastián Molano (COL)	UAE Team Emirates	50
2	Romain Bardet (FRA)	Team DSM	37
3	Mikel Landa (ESP)	Team Bahrain Victorious	33
4	Vincenzo Albanese (ITA)	Eolo–Kometa	32
5	Jon Aberasturi (ESP)	Caja Rural–Seguros RGA	32
6	Matteo Trentin (ITA)	UAE Team Emirates	30
7	Edward Planckaert (BEL)	Alpecin–Fenix	28
8	Gonzalo Serrano (ESP)	Movistar Team	27
9	Jordi Meeus (BEL)	Bora–Hansgrohe	26
10	Hugh Carthy (GBR)	EF Education–Nippo	25

=== Mountains classification ===
Final mountains classification (1–10)
Rank	Rider	Team	Points
1	Romain Bardet (FRA)	Team DSM	30
2	Hugh Carthy (GBR)	EF Education–Nippo	30
3	Mikel Landa (ESP)	Team Bahrain Victorious	30
4	Einer Rubio (COL)	Movistar Team	25
5	Geoffrey Bouchard (FRA)	AG2R Citroën Team	25
6	Simon Yates (GBR)	Team BikeExchange	20
7	Egan Bernal (COL)	Ineos Grenadiers	19
8	Oier Lazkano (ESP)	Caja Rural–Seguros RGA	18
9	Mikel Bizkarra (ESP)	Euskaltel–Euskadi	17
10	Fabio Aru (ITA)	Team Qhubeka NextHash	16

=== Young rider classification ===
Final young rider classification (1–10)
Rank	Rider	Team	Time
1	Einer Rubio (COL)	Movistar Team	18h 30' 58"
2	Santiago Buitrago (COL)	Team Bahrain Victorious	+ 11"
3	Andrés Ardila (COL)	UAE Team Emirates	+ 1' 44"
4	Tobias Bayer (AUT)	Alpecin–Fenix	+ 3' 42"
5	Roger Adrià (ESP)	Equipo Kern Pharma	+ 3' 42"
6	Thymen Arensman (NED)	Team DSM	+ 5' 30"
7	Lars van den Berg (NED)	Groupama–FDJ	+ 9' 03"
8	Jokin Murguialday (ESP)	Caja Rural–Seguros RGA	+ 10' 37"
9	Carlos García Pierna (ESP)	Equipo Kern Pharma	+ 11' 46"
10	Matis Louvel (FRA)	Arkéa–Samsic	+ 13' 03"

=== Spanish rider classification ===
Final Spanish rider classification (1–10)
Rank	Rider	Team	Time
1	Mikel Landa (ESP)	Team Bahrain Victorious	18h 30' 00"
2	David de la Cruz (ESP)	UAE Team Emirates	+ 51"
3	Roger Adrià (ESP)	Equipo Kern Pharma	+ 4' 40"
4	Urko Berrade (ESP)	Equipo Kern Pharma	+ 4' 58"
5	Ángel Madrazo (ESP)	Burgos BH	+ 5' 22"
6	Óscar Rodríguez (ESP)	Astana–Premier Tech	+ 5' 41"
7	Mikel Iturria (ESP)	Euskaltel–Euskadi	+ 6' 22"
8	Víctor de la Parte (ESP)	Team TotalEnergies	+ 6' 41"
9	Jonathan Lastra (ESP)	Caja Rural–Seguros RGA	+ 6' 48"
10	Luis León Sánchez (ESP)	Astana–Premier Tech	+ 9' 13"

=== Team classification ===
Final team classification (1–10)
Rank	Team	Time
1	Team Bahrain Victorious	55h 31' 44"
2	Astana–Premier Tech	+ 7' 40"
3	Movistar Team	+ 8' 53"
4	UAE Team Emirates	+ 8' 57"
5	AG2R Citroën Team	+ 9' 44"
6	Equipo Kern Pharma	+ 9' 53"
7	Team DSM	+ 10' 28"
8	Team BikeExchange	+ 12' 58"
9	Euskaltel–Euskadi	+ 14' 43"
10	Burgos BH	+ 14' 44"
