= 2025 Vuelta a Burgos =

Men's road cycling stage race

2025 UCI ProSeries

Race details
- Dates: 5–9 August 2025
- Stages: 5
- Distance: 851.4 km (529.0 mi)
- Winning time: 19h 46' 48"

Results
Jersey awarded to the overall winner	Winner	Isaac del Toro (MEX)	(UAE Team Emirates XRG)
	Second	Lorenzo Fortunato (ITA)	(XDS Astana Team)
	Third	Léo Bisiaux (FRA)	(Decathlon–AG2R La Mondiale)
Jersey awarded to the points classification winner	Points	Giulio Ciccone (ITA)	(Lidl–Trek)
Jersey awarded to the mountains classification winner	Mountains	Carlos García Pierna (ESP)	(Burgos Burpellet BH)
Jersey awarded to the young rider classification winner	Young rider	Isaac del Toro (MEX)	(UAE Team Emirates XRG)
	Team	(Germany) Red Bull–Bora–Hansgrohe	

The 2025 Vuelta a Burgos is a men's road cycling stage race that takes place from 5 to 9 August 2025 in the Spanish province of Burgos. It is the 47th edition of the Vuelta a Burgos, and is rated as a 2.Pro event as part of the 2025 UCI ProSeries calendar.

== Teams ==
Ten of the eighteen UCI WorldTeams were joined by eight UCI ProTeams and one UCI Continental team to make up the nineteen teams that participate in the race.

UCI WorldTeams

- Decathlon–AG2R La Mondiale
- EF Education–EasyPost
- INEOS Grenadiers
- Lidl–Trek
- Movistar Team
- Red Bull–Bora–Hansgrohe
- Soudal–Quick-Step
- Team Bahrain Victorious
- UAE Team Emirates XRG
- XDS Astana Team

UCI ProTeams

- Burgos Burpellet BH
- Caja Rural–Seguros RGA
- Equipo Kern Pharma
- Euskaltel–Euskadi
- Q36.5 Pro Cycling Team
- Team Polti VisitMalta
- Tudor Pro Cycling Team
- Uno-X Mobility

UCI Continental Teams

- Illes Balears Arabay

== Route ==
Stage characteristics and winners
Stage	Date	Course	Distance	Type	Stage winner
1	5 August	Olmillos de Sasamón to Burgos	204.7 km (127.2 mi)	Medium-mountain stage	Roger Adrià (ESP)
2	6 August	Cilleruelo de Abajo to Buniel	161.6 km (100.4 mi)	Hilly stage	Matteo Moschetti (ITA)
3	7 August	Monasterio de San Pedro de Cardeña to Valpuesta	184.1 km (114.4 mi)	Medium-mountain stage	Léo Bisiaux (FRA)
4	8 August	Doña Santos to Reguimel de la Sierra	162.7 km (101.1 mi)	Hilly stage	Damiano Caruso (ITA)
5	9 August	Quintana del Pidio to Lagunas de Neila	138.3 km (85.9 mi)	Mountain stage	Giulio Ciccone (ITA)
Total			641.5 km (398.6 mi)		

== Stages ==
=== Stage 1 ===
5 August 2025 – Olmillos de Sasamón to Burgos, 204.7 km (127.2 mi)

Stage 1 Result
Rank	Rider	Team	Time
1	Roger Adrià (ESP)	Red Bull–Bora–Hansgrohe	4h 49' 46"
2	Jordan Labrosse (FRA)	Decathlon–AG2R La Mondiale	+ 0"
3	Afonso Eulálio (POR)	Team Bahrain Victorious	+ 4"
4	Léo Bisiaux (FRA)	Decathlon–AG2R La Mondiale	+ 4"
5	Damiano Caruso (ITA)	Team Bahrain Victorious	+ 4"
6	Fabio Christen (SUI)	Q36.5 Pro Cycling Team	+ 7"
7	Lucas Eriksson (SWE)	Tudor Pro Cycling Team	+ 7"
8	Egan Bernal (COL)	INEOS Grenadiers	+ 7"
9	Archie Ryan (IRL)	EF Education–EasyPost	+ 7"
10	Brandon Rivera (COL)	INEOS Grenadiers	+ 11"

General classification after Stage 1
Rank	Rider	Team	Time
1	Roger Adrià (ESP)	Red Bull–Bora–Hansgrohe	4h 49' 36"
2	Jordan Labrosse (FRA)	Decathlon–AG2R La Mondiale	+ 4"
3	Afonso Eulálio (POR)	Team Bahrain Victorious	+ 10"
4	Léo Bisiaux (FRA)	Decathlon–AG2R La Mondiale	+ 14"
5	Damiano Caruso (ITA)	Team Bahrain Victorious	+ 14"
6	Fabio Christen (SUI)	Q36.5 Pro Cycling Team	+ 17"
7	Lucas Eriksson (SWE)	Tudor Pro Cycling Team	+ 17"
8	Egan Bernal (COL)	INEOS Grenadiers	+ 17"
9	Archie Ryan (IRL)	EF Education–EasyPost	+ 17"
10	Javier Romo (ESP)	Movistar Team	+ 20"

=== Stage 2 ===
6 August 2025 – Cilleruelo de Abajo to Buniel, 161.6 km (100.4 mi)

Stage 2 Result
Rank	Rider	Team	Time
1	Matteo Moschetti (ITA)	Q36.5 Pro Cycling Team	3h 37' 05"
2	Matteo Malucelli (ITA)	XDS Astana Team	+ 0"
3	Juan Sebastián Molano (COL)	UAE Team Emirates XRG	+ 0"
4	Erlend Blikra (NOR)	Uno-X Mobility	+ 0"
5	Pierre Gautherat (FRA)	Decathlon–AG2R La Mondiale	+ 0"
6	Giovanni Lonardi (ITA)	Team Polti VisitMalta	+ 0"
7	Luke Lamperti (USA)	Soudal–Quick-Step	+ 0"
8	Marc Brustenga (ESP)	Equipo Kern Pharma	+ 0"
9	Gianluca Pollefliet (BEL)	Decathlon–AG2R La Mondiale	+ 0"
10	Héctor Álvarez (ESP)	Lidl–Trek	+ 0"

General classification after Stage 2
Rank	Rider	Team	Time
1	Roger Adrià (ESP)	Red Bull–Bora–Hansgrohe	8h 26' 41"
2	Jordan Labrosse (FRA)	Decathlon–AG2R La Mondiale	+ 4"
3	Afonso Eulálio (POR)	Team Bahrain Victorious	+ 10"
4	Damiano Caruso (ITA)	Team Bahrain Victorious	+ 14"
5	Léo Bisiaux (FRA)	Decathlon–AG2R La Mondiale	+ 14"
6	Fabio Christen (SUI)	Q36.5 Pro Cycling Team	+ 17"
7	Lucas Eriksson (SWE)	Tudor Pro Cycling Team	+ 17"
8	Archie Ryan (IRL)	EF Education–EasyPost	+ 17"
9	Egan Bernal (COL)	INEOS Grenadiers	+ 17"
10	Javier Romo (ESP)	Movistar Team	+ 20"

=== Stage 3 ===
7 August 2025 – Monasterio de San Pedro de Cardeña to Valpuesta, 184.1 km (114.4 mi)

Stage 3 Result
Rank	Rider	Team	Time
1	Léo Bisiaux (FRA)	Decathlon–AG2R La Mondiale	4h 19' 44"
2	Giulio Ciccone (ITA)	Lidl–Trek	+ 9"
3	Giulio Pellizzari (ITA)	Red Bull–Bora–Hansgrohe	+ 9"
4	Isaac del Toro (MEX)	UAE Team Emirates XRG	+ 9"
5	Lorenzo Fortunato (ITA)	XDS Astana Team	+ 9"
6	Giovanni Aleotti (ITA)	Red Bull–Bora–Hansgrohe	+ 23"
7	Johannes Kulset (NOR)	Uno-X Mobility	+ 23"
8	Urko Berrade (ESP)	Equipo Kern Pharma	+ 23"
9	Andrew August (USA)	INEOS Grenadiers	+ 23"
10	Fabio Christen (SUI)	Q36.5 Pro Cycling Team	+ 39"

General classification after Stage 3
Rank	Rider	Team	Time
1	Léo Bisiaux (FRA)	Decathlon–AG2R La Mondiale	12h 46' 29"
2	Giulio Pellizzari (ITA)	Red Bull–Bora–Hansgrohe	+ 22"
3	Isaac del Toro (MEX)	UAE Team Emirates XRG	+ 26"
4	Lorenzo Fortunato (ITA)	XDS Astana Team	+ 26"
5	Johannes Kulset (NOR)	Uno-X Mobility	+ 40"
6	Giovanni Aleotti (ITA)	Red Bull–Bora–Hansgrohe	+ 40"
7	Urko Berrade (ESP)	Equipo Kern Pharma	+ 40"
8	Andrew August (USA)	INEOS Grenadiers	+ 40"
9	Fabio Christen (SUI)	Q36.5 Pro Cycling Team	+ 52"
10	Egan Bernal (COL)	INEOS Grenadiers	+ 53"

=== Stage 4 ===
8 August 2025 – Doña Santos to Reguimel de la Sierra, 162.7 km (101.1 mi)

Stage 4 Result
Rank	Rider	Team	Time
1	Damiano Caruso (ITA)	Team Bahrain Victorious	3h 33' 18"
2	Rui Costa (POR)	EF Education–EasyPost	+ 1' 26"
3	Rui Oliveira (POR)	UAE Team Emirates XRG	+ 1' 26"
4	Larry Warbasse (USA)	Tudor Pro Cycling Team	+ 1' 26"
5	Ben Zwiehoff (GER)	Red Bull–Bora–Hansgrohe	+ 1' 26"
6	Javier Romo (ESP)	Movistar Team	+ 1' 56"
7	Héctor Álvarez (ESP)	Lidl–Trek	+ 3' 15"
8	Miká Heming (GER)	Tudor Pro Cycling Team	+ 3' 15"
9	David González (ESP)	Q36.5 Pro Cycling Team	+ 3' 15"
10	Antoine Huby (FRA)	Soudal–Quick-Step	+ 3' 15"

General classification after Stage 4
Rank	Rider	Team	Time
1	Léo Bisiaux (FRA)	Decathlon–AG2R La Mondiale	16h 23' 02"
2	Giulio Pellizzari (ITA)	Red Bull–Bora–Hansgrohe	+ 22"
3	Isaac del Toro (MEX)	UAE Team Emirates XRG	+ 26"
4	Lorenzo Fortunato (ITA)	XDS Astana Team	+ 26"
5	Johannes Kulset (NOR)	Uno-X Mobility	+ 40"
6	Giovanni Aleotti (ITA)	Red Bull–Bora–Hansgrohe	+ 40"
7	Urko Berrade (ESP)	Equipo Kern Pharma	+ 40"
8	Andrew August (USA)	INEOS Grenadiers	+ 40"
9	Fabio Christen (SUI)	Q36.5 Pro Cycling Team	+ 52"
10	Egan Bernal (COL)	INEOS Grenadiers	+ 53"

=== Stage 5 ===
9 August 2025 – Quintana del Pidio to Lagunas de Neila, 138.3 km (85.9 mi)

Stage 5 Result
Rank	Rider	Team	Time
1	Giulio Ciccone (ITA)	Lidl–Trek	3h 23' 16"
2	Isaac del Toro (MEX)	UAE Team Emirates XRG	+ 10"
3	Lorenzo Fortunato (ITA)	XDS Astana Team	+ 27"
4	Torstein Træen (NOR)	Team Bahrain Victorious	+ 34"
5	Damien Howson (AUS)	Q36.5 Pro Cycling Team	+ 36"
6	Egan Bernal (COL)	INEOS Grenadiers	+ 36"
7	Giulio Pellizzari (ITA)	Red Bull–Bora–Hansgrohe	+ 38"
8	Giovanni Aleotti (ITA)	Red Bull–Bora–Hansgrohe	+ 53"
9	Diego Pescador (COL)	Movistar Team	+ 55"
10	Johannes Kulset (NOR)	Uno-X Mobility	+ 55"

General classification after Stage 5
Rank	Rider	Team	Time
1	Isaac del Toro (MEX)	UAE Team Emirates XRG	19h 46' 48"
2	Lorenzo Fortunato (ITA)	XDS Astana Team	+ 19"
3	Léo Bisiaux (FRA)	Decathlon–AG2R La Mondiale	+ 25"
4	Giulio Pellizzari (ITA)	Red Bull–Bora–Hansgrohe	+ 30"
5	Giulio Ciccone (ITA)	Lidl–Trek	+ 56"
6	Egan Bernal (COL)	INEOS Grenadiers	+ 59"
7	Torstein Træen (NOR)	Team Bahrain Victorious	+ 1' 01"
8	Giovanni Aleotti (ITA)	Red Bull–Bora–Hansgrohe	+ 1' 03"
9	Johannes Kulset (NOR)	Uno-X Mobility	+ 1' 05"
10	Urko Berrade (ESP)	Equipo Kern Pharma	+ 2' 04"

== Classification leadership table ==
Classification leadership by stage
Stage	Winner	General classification	Points classification	Mountains classification	Young rider classification	Team classification
1	Roger Adrià	Roger Adrià	Roger Adrià	Carlos García Pierna	Jordan Labrosse	Decathlon–AG2R La Mondiale
2	Matteo Moschetti	Roger Adrià	Roger Adrià	Carlos García Pierna	Jordan Labrosse	Decathlon–AG2R La Mondiale
3	Léo Bisiaux	Léo Bisiaux	Léo Bisiaux	Carlos García Pierna	Léo Bisiaux	Red Bull–Bora–Hansgrohe
4	Damiano Caruso	Léo Bisiaux	Léo Bisiaux	Carlos García Pierna	Léo Bisiaux	Red Bull–Bora–Hansgrohe
5	Giulio Ciccone	Isaac del Toro	Giulio Ciccone	Carlos García Pierna	Isaac del Toro	Red Bull–Bora–Hansgrohe
Final		Isaac del Toro	Giulio Ciccone	Carlos García Pierna	Isaac del Toro	Red Bull–Bora–Hansgrohe

== Classification standings ==
Legend
Denotes the winner of the general classification	Denotes the winner of the mountains classification
Denotes the winner of the points classification	Denotes the winner of the young rider classification

=== General classification ===
Final general classification (1–10)
Rank	Rider	Team	Time
1	Isaac del Toro (MEX)	UAE Team Emirates XRG	19h 46' 48"
2	Lorenzo Fortunato (ITA)	XDS Astana Team	+ 19"
3	Léo Bisiaux (FRA)	Decathlon–AG2R La Mondiale	+ 25"
4	Giulio Pellizzari (ITA)	Red Bull–Bora–Hansgrohe	+ 30"
5	Giulio Ciccone (ITA)	Lidl–Trek	+ 56"
6	Egan Bernal (COL)	INEOS Grenadiers	+ 59"
7	Torstein Træen (NOR)	Team Bahrain Victorious	+ 1' 01"
8	Giovanni Aleotti (ITA)	Red Bull–Bora–Hansgrohe	+ 1' 03"
9	Johannes Kulset (NOR)	Uno-X Mobility	+ 1' 05"
10	Urko Berrade (ESP)	Equipo Kern Pharma	+ 2' 04"

=== Points classification ===
Final points classification (1–10)
Rank	Rider	Team	Points
1	Giulio Ciccone (ITA)	Lidl–Trek	45
2	Léo Bisiaux (FRA)	Decathlon–AG2R La Mondiale	44
3	Damiano Caruso (ITA)	Team Bahrain Victorious	37
4	Isaac del Toro (MEX)	UAE Team Emirates XRG	34
5	Lorenzo Fortunato (ITA)	XDS Astana Team	28
6	Roger Adrià (ESP)	Red Bull–Bora–Hansgrohe	26
7	Giulio Pellizzari (ITA)	Red Bull–Bora–Hansgrohe	25
8	Egan Bernal (COL)	INEOS Grenadiers	21
9	Giovanni Aleotti (ITA)	Red Bull–Bora–Hansgrohe	20
10	Johannes Kulset (NOR)	Uno-X Mobility	20

=== Mountains classification ===
Final mountains classification (1–10)
Rank	Rider	Team	Points
1	Carlos García Pierna (ESP)	Burgos Burpellet BH	52
2	Giulio Ciccone (ITA)	Lidl–Trek	44
3	Isaac del Toro (MEX)	UAE Team Emirates XRG	34
4	Lorenzo Fortunato (ITA)	XDS Astana Team	30
5	Léo Bisiaux (FRA)	Decathlon–AG2R La Mondiale	22
6	Gorka Sorarrain (ESP)	Caja Rural–Seguros RGA	18
7	Giulio Pellizzari (ITA)	Red Bull–Bora–Hansgrohe	16
8	Torstein Træen (NOR)	Team Bahrain Victorious	16
9	Javier Ibáñez (ESP)	Caja Rural–Seguros RGA	14
10	Txomin Juaristi (ESP)	Euskaltel–Euskadi	14

=== Young rider classification ===
Final young rider classification (1–10)
Rank	Rider	Team	Time
1	Isaac del Toro (MEX)	UAE Team Emirates XRG	19h 46' 48"
2	Léo Bisiaux (FRA)	Decathlon–AG2R La Mondiale	+ 25"
3	Giulio Pellizzari (ITA)	Red Bull–Bora–Hansgrohe	+ 30"
4	Johannes Kulset (NOR)	Uno-X Mobility	+ 1' 05"
5	Mathys Rondel (FRA)	Tudor Pro Cycling Team	+ 2' 35"
6	Diego Pescador (COL)	Movistar Team	+ 2' 35"
7	Andrew August (USA)	INEOS Grenadiers	+ 2' 37"
8	Fabio Christen (SUI)	Q36.5 Pro Cycling Team	+ 3' 10"
9	Davide Piganzoli (ITA)	Team Polti VisitMalta	+ 3' 44"
10	Finlay Pickering (GBR)	Team Bahrain Victorious	+ 5' 13"

=== Team classification ===
Final team classification (1–10)
Rank	Team	Time
1	(Germany) Red Bull–Bora–Hansgrohe	59h 25' 37"
2	Team Bahrain Victorious	+ 4' 28"
3	(United Kingdom) INEOS Grenadiers	+ 4' 32"
4	(Spain) Movistar Team	+ 4' 59"
5	(Spain) Burgos Burpellet BH	+ 6' 36"
6	(United States) EF Education–EasyPost	+ 7' 56"
7	(Spain) Equipo Kern Pharma	+ 11' 30"
8	(France) Decathlon–AG2R La Mondiale	+ 14' 17"
9	(Italy) Team Polti VisitMalta	+ 15' 08"
10	(Belgium) Soudal–Quick-Step	+ 15' 35"
