= 2023 Route d'Occitanie =

2023 UCI Europe Tour

Race details
- Dates: 15–18 June 2023
- Stages: 4
- Distance: 720 km (447.4 mi)
- Winning time: 18h 00' 02"

Results
Jersey awarded to the overall winner	Winner	Michael Woods (CAN)	(Israel–Premier Tech)
	Second	Cristián Rodríguez (ESP)	(Arkéa–Samsic)
	Third	Georg Steinhauser (GER)	(EF Education–EasyPost)
Jersey awarded to the points classification winner	Points	Marijn van den Berg (NED)	(EF Education–EasyPost)
Jersey awarded to the mountains classification winner	Mountains	Carlos García Pierna (ESP)	(Equipo Kern Pharma)
Jersey awarded to the youth classification winner	Youth	Georg Steinhauser (GER)	(EF Education–EasyPost)
	Team	Movistar Team	

The 2023 Route d'Occitanie (known as the La Route d'Occitanie - La Dépêche du Midi for sponsorship reasons) is a road cycling stage race that took place between 15 and 18 June 2023 in the southern French region of Occitanie. The race was the 47th edition of the Route d'Occitanie and was rated as a category 2.1 event on the 2023 UCI Europe Tour.

== Teams ==
Seven UCI WorldTeams, seven UCI ProTeams, and four UCI Continental made up the eighteen teams that participated in the race.

UCI WorldTeams

- AG2R Citroën Team
- Arkéa–Samsic
- Cofidis
- EF Education–EasyPost
- Groupama–FDJ
- Ineos Grenadiers
- Movistar Team

UCI ProTeams

- Burgos BH
- Caja Rural–Seguros RGA
- Equipo Kern Pharma
- Euskaltel–Euskadi
- Israel–Premier Tech
- Team TotalEnergies
- Uno-X Pro Cycling Team

UCI Continental Teams

- CIC U Nantes Atlantique
- Nice Métropole Côte d'Azur
- St. Michel–Mavic–Auber93
- Van Rysel–Roubaix–Lille Métropole

== Route ==
Stage characteristics and winners
Stage	Date	Course	Distance	Type	Stage winner
1	15 June	Narbonne to Gruissan	184.3 km (114.5 mi)	Flat stage	Marijn van den Berg (NED)
2	16 June	Cazouls-lès-Béziers to Graulhet	182 km (113 mi)	Hilly stage	Jason Tesson (FRA)
3	17 June	Gimont to Nistos	189 km (117 mi)	Mountain stage	Michael Woods (CAN)
4	18 June	Saint-Gaudens to Saint-Girons	164.7 km (102.3 mi)	Hilly stage	Simon Carr (GBR)
Total			720 km (450 mi)		

== Stages ==
=== Stage 1 ===
15 June 2023 – Narbonne to Gruissan, 184.3 km (114.5 mi)

Stage 1 Result
Rank	Rider	Team	Time
1	Marijn van den Berg (NED)	EF Education–EasyPost	4h 18' 54"
2	Sandy Dujardin (FRA)	Team TotalEnergies	+ 0"
3	Paul Penhoët (FRA)	Groupama–FDJ	+ 0"
4	Corbin Strong (NZL)	Israel–Premier Tech	+ 0"
5	Dries Van Gestel (BEL)	Team TotalEnergies	+ 0"
6	Benoît Cosnefroy (FRA)	AG2R Citroën Team	+ 0"
7	Luke Plapp (AUS)	Ineos Grenadiers	+ 0"
8	Michael Woods (CAN)	Israel–Premier Tech	+ 0"
9	Filippo Ganna (ITA)	Ineos Grenadiers	+ 0"
10	Valentin Paret-Peintre (FRA)	AG2R Citroën Team	+ 0"

General classification after Stage 1
Rank	Rider	Team	Time
1	Marijn van den Berg (NED)	EF Education–EasyPost	4h 18' 44"
2	Sandy Dujardin (FRA)	Team TotalEnergies	+ 4"
3	Paul Penhoët (FRA)	Groupama–FDJ	+ 6"
4	Benoît Cosnefroy (FRA)	AG2R Citroën Team	+ 7"
5	Luke Plapp (AUS)	Ineos Grenadiers	+ 8"
6	Corbin Strong (NZL)	Israel–Premier Tech	+ 10"
7	Dries Van Gestel (BEL)	Team TotalEnergies	+ 10"
8	Michael Woods (CAN)	Israel–Premier Tech	+ 10"
9	Filippo Ganna (ITA)	Ineos Grenadiers	+ 10"
10	Valentin Paret-Peintre (FRA)	AG2R Citroën Team	+ 10"

=== Stage 2 ===
16 June 2023 – Cazouls-lès-Béziers to Graulhet, 182 km (113 mi)

Stage 2 Result
Rank	Rider	Team	Time
1	Jason Tesson (FRA)	Team TotalEnergies	4h 44' 14"
2	Corbin Strong (NZL)	Israel–Premier Tech	+ 0"
3	Elia Viviani (ITA)	Ineos Grenadiers	+ 0"
4	Emmanuel Morrin (FRA)	CIC U Nantes Atlantique	+ 0"
5	Paul Hennequin (FRA)	Nice Métropole Côte d'Azur	+ 0"
6	Marcus Sander Hansen (DEN)	Uno-X Pro Cycling Team	+ 0"
7	Dries Van Gestel (BEL)	Team TotalEnergies	+ 0"
8	Paul Penhoët (FRA)	Groupama–FDJ	+ 0"
9	Orluis Aular (VEN)	Caja Rural–Seguros RGA	+ 0"
10	Maxime Jarnet (FRA)	Van Rysel–Roubaix–Lille Métropole	+ 0"

General classification after Stage 2
Rank	Rider	Team	Time
1	Marijn van den Berg (NED)	EF Education–EasyPost	9h 02' 58"
2	Benoît Cosnefroy (FRA)	AG2R Citroën Team	+ 3"
3	Corbin Strong (NZL)	Israel–Premier Tech	+ 4"
4	Sandy Dujardin (FRA)	Team TotalEnergies	+ 4"
5	Ådne Holter (NOR)	Uno-X Pro Cycling Team	+ 5"
6	Paul Penhoët (FRA)	Groupama–FDJ	+ 6"
7	Elia Viviani (ITA)	Ineos Grenadiers	+ 6"
8	Michael Woods (CAN)	Israel–Premier Tech	+ 7"
9	Luke Plapp (AUS)	Ineos Grenadiers	+ 8"
10	Dries Van Gestel (BEL)	Team TotalEnergies	+ 10"

=== Stage 3 ===
17 June 2023 – Gimont to Nistos, 189 km (117 mi)

Stage 3 Result
Rank	Rider	Team	Time
1	Michael Woods (CAN)	Israel–Premier Tech	5h 02' 15"
2	Cristián Rodríguez (ESP)	Arkéa–Samsic	+ 3"
3	Jesús Herrada (ESP)	Cofidis	+ 13"
4	Victor Lafay (FRA)	Cofidis	+ 15"
5	Iván Sosa (COL)	Movistar Team	+ 16"
6	Ruben Guerreiro (POR)	Movistar Team	+ 24"
7	Georg Steinhauser (GER)	EF Education–EasyPost	+ 28"
8	Einer Rubio (COL)	Movistar Team	+ 29"
9	Domenico Pozzovivo (ITA)	Israel–Premier Tech	+ 29"
10	Élie Gesbert (FRA)	Arkéa–Samsic	+ 1' 02"

General classification after Stage 3
Rank	Rider	Team	Time
1	Michael Woods (CAN)	Israel–Premier Tech	14h 05' 10"
2	Cristián Rodríguez (ESP)	Arkéa–Samsic	+ 10"
3	Georg Steinhauser (GER)	EF Education–EasyPost	+ 41"
4	Einer Rubio (COL)	Movistar Team	+ 42"
5	Domenico Pozzovivo (ITA)	Israel–Premier Tech	+ 42"
6	Jesús Herrada (ESP)	Cofidis	+ 1' 06"
7	Victor Lafay (FRA)	Cofidis	+ 1' 12"
8	Iván Sosa (COL)	Movistar Team	+ 1' 13"
9	Ruben Guerreiro (POR)	Movistar Team	+ 1' 21"
10	Élie Gesbert (FRA)	Arkéa–Samsic	+ 1' 59"

=== Stage 4 ===
18 June 2023 – Saint-Gaudens to Saint-Girons, 164.7 km (102.3 mi)

Stage 4 Result
Rank	Rider	Team	Time
1	Simon Carr (GBR)	EF Education–EasyPost	3h 54' 50"
2	Lars van den Berg (NED)	Groupama–FDJ	+ 0"
3	Marijn van den Berg (NED)	EF Education–EasyPost	+ 2"
4	Corbin Strong (NZL)	Israel–Premier Tech	+ 2"
5	Filippo Ganna (ITA)	Ineos Grenadiers	+ 2"
6	Thomas Gachignard (FRA)	St. Michel–Mavic–Auber93	+ 2"
7	Ruben Guerreiro (POR)	Movistar Team	+ 2"
8	Rudy Molard (FRA)	Groupama–FDJ	+ 2"
9	Einer Rubio (COL)	Movistar Team	+ 2"
10	Jordan Jegat (FRA)	CIC U Nantes Atlantique	+ 2"

General classification after Stage 4
Rank	Rider	Team	Time
1	Michael Woods (CAN)	Israel–Premier Tech	18h 00' 02"
2	Cristián Rodríguez (ESP)	Arkéa–Samsic	+ 10"
3	Georg Steinhauser (GER)	EF Education–EasyPost	+ 41"
4	Einer Rubio (COL)	Movistar Team	+ 42"
5	Domenico Pozzovivo (ITA)	Israel–Premier Tech	+ 42"
6	Jesús Herrada (ESP)	Cofidis	+ 1' 06"
7	Victor Lafay (FRA)	Cofidis	+ 1' 12"
8	Iván Sosa (COL)	Movistar Team	+ 1' 13"
9	Ruben Guerreiro (POR)	Movistar Team	+ 1' 21"
10	Brandon Rivera (COL)	Ineos Grenadiers	+ 2' 03"

== Classification leadership table ==
Classification leadership by stage
Stage	Winner	General classification	Points classification	Mountains classification	Young rider classification	Team classification	Combativity award
1	Marijn van den Berg	Marijn van den Berg	Marijn van den Berg	Eric Antonio Fagundez	Marijn van den Berg	Israel–Premier Tech	Théo Delacroix
2	Jason Tesson	Marijn van den Berg	Corbin Strong	Carlos García Pierna	Marijn van den Berg	Ineos Grenadiers	Carlos García Pierna
3	Michael Woods	Michael Woods	Corbin Strong	Carlos García Pierna	Georg Steinhauser	Movistar Team	Pelayo Sánchez
4	Simon Carr	Michael Woods	Marijn van den Berg	Carlos García Pierna	Georg Steinhauser	Movistar Team	José Manuel Díaz
Final		Michael Woods	Marijn van den Berg	Carlos García Pierna	Georg Steinhauser	Movistar Team	not awarded

== Classification standings ==
Legend
Denotes the winner of the general classification	Denotes the winner of the mountains classification
Denotes the winner of the points classification	Denotes the winner of the young rider classification

=== General classification ===
Final general classification (1–10)
Rank	Rider	Team	Time
1	Michael Woods (CAN)	Israel–Premier Tech	18h 00' 02"
2	Cristián Rodríguez (ESP)	Arkéa–Samsic	+ 10"
3	Georg Steinhauser (GER)	EF Education–EasyPost	+ 41"
4	Einer Rubio (COL)	Movistar Team	+ 42"
5	Domenico Pozzovivo (ITA)	Israel–Premier Tech	+ 42"
6	Jesús Herrada (ESP)	Cofidis	+ 1' 06"
7	Victor Lafay (FRA)	Cofidis	+ 1' 12"
8	Iván Sosa (COL)	Ineos Grenadiers	+ 1' 13"
9	Ruben Guerreiro (POR)	Movistar Team	+ 1' 21"
10	Brandon Rivera (COL)	Ineos Grenadiers	+ 2' 03"

=== Points classification ===
Final points classification (1–10)
Rank	Rider	Team	Points
1	Marijn van den Berg (NED)	EF Education–EasyPost	50
2	Corbin Strong (NZL)	Israel–Premier Tech	43
3	Michael Woods (CAN)	Israel–Premier Tech	27
4	Benoît Cosnefroy (FRA)	AG2R Citroën Team	23
5	Sandy Dujardin (FRA)	Team TotalEnergies	23
6	Paul Penhoët (FRA)	Groupama–FDJ	23
7	Simon Carr (GBR)	EF Education–EasyPost	21
8	Jason Tesson (FRA)	Team TotalEnergies	20
9	Dries Van Gestel (BEL)	Team TotalEnergies	20
10	Filippo Ganna (ITA)	Ineos Grenadiers	18

=== Mountains classification ===
Final mountains classification (1–10)
Rank	Rider	Team	Points
1	Carlos García Pierna (ESP)	Equipo Kern Pharma	23
2	Lars van den Berg (NED)	Groupama–FDJ	18
3	Michael Woods (CAN)	Israel–Premier Tech	15
4	Pelayo Sánchez (ESP)	Burgos BH	15
5	Andrea Mifsud (FRA)	Nice Métropole Côte d'Azur	15
6	Simon Carr (GBR)	EF Education–EasyPost	14
7	Eric Antonio Fagundez (URU)	Burgos BH	13
8	Joris Delbove (FRA)	St. Michel–Mavic–Auber93	13
9	Josu Etxeberria (ESP)	Caja Rural–Seguros RGA	10
10	Cristián Rodríguez (ESP)	Arkéa–Samsic	10

=== Young rider classification ===
Final young rider classification (1–10)
Rank	Rider	Team	Time
1	Georg Steinhauser (GER)	EF Education–EasyPost	18h 00' 43"
2	Einer Rubio (COL)	Movistar Team	+ 1"
3	Valentin Paret-Peintre (FRA)	AG2R Citroën Team	+ 1' 31"
4	Diego Camargo (COL)	EF Education–EasyPost	+ 1' 44"
5	Jordan Jegat (FRA)	CIC U Nantes Atlantique	+ 2' 10"
6	Pablo Castrillo (ESP)	Equipo Kern Pharma	+ 3' 53"
7	Thomas Gachignard (FRA)	St. Michel–Mavic–Auber93	+ 4' 28"
8	Johannes Kulset (NOR)	Uno-X Pro Cycling Team	+ 4' 55"
9	Lars van den Berg (NED)	Groupama–FDJ	+ 5' 04"
10	Michel Ries (LUX)	Arkéa–Samsic	+ 5' 20"

=== Team classification ===
Final team classification (1–10)
Rank	Team	Time
1	Movistar Team	54h 03' 22"
2	EF Education–EasyPost	+ 1' 17"
3	Israel–Premier Tech	+ 3' 38"
4	Arkéa–Samsic	+ 5' 55"
5	Cofidis	+ 6' 15"
6	Equipo Kern Pharma	+ 8' 04"
7	AG2R Citroën Team	+ 15' 01"
8	CIC U Nantes Atlantique	+ 19' 12"
9	Groupama–FDJ	+ 23' 13"
10	Caja Rural–Seguros RGA	+ 23' 43"
