= 2022 Tour de Langkawi =

Malaysian cycling race

2022 UCI ProSeries

Race details
- Dates: 11–18 October 2022
- Stages: 8
- Distance: 1,096.9 km (681.6 mi)

Results
Jersey awarded to the overall winner	Winner	Iván Sosa (COL)	(Movistar Team)
	Second	Hugh Carthy (GBR)	(EF Education–EasyPost)
	Third	Torstein Træen (NOR)	(Uno-X Pro Cycling Team)
Jersey awarded to the points classification winner	Points	Erlend Blikra (NOR)	(Uno-X Pro Cycling Team)
Jersey awarded to the mountains classification winner	Mountains	Nur Aiman Mohd Zariff (MAS)	(Terengganu Polygon Cycling Team)

The 2022 Tour de Langkawi (known as the Petronas Le Tour de Langkawi for sponsorship reasons) was a road cycling stage race that took place from 11 to 18 October 2022 in Malaysia. The race is a category 2.Pro-rated event as part of the 2022 UCI ProSeries, and is the 26th edition of the Tour de Langkawi. The race returned after a one-year hiatus, due to the COVID-19 pandemic in Malaysia, and is making its second appearance in the UCI ProSeries.

In late January, race organisers postponed the Tour de Langkawi, originally scheduled for 3–10 March, to 11–18 June, due to a surge in COVID-19 pandemic cases. It was postponed again, to mid-October, due to time conflicts with other cycling championships.

After the race, the UCI received complains from five teams of non-payments of appearance fees and flight tickets from the race organiser.

== Teams ==
Six of the 18 UCI WorldTeams, four UCI ProTeams, seven UCI Continental teams, and three national teams make up the 20 teams that are participating in the race. Each team can enter a roster of up to six riders.

Defending champion Team Sapura Cycling were barred from competing in the event due to making a late payment to the UCI's enhanced anti-doping programme.

UCI WorldTeams

- Astana Qazaqstan Team
- Cofidis
- EF Education–EasyPost
- Lotto–Soudal
- Movistar Team
- UAE Team Emirates

UCI ProTeams

- Alpecin–Deceuninck
- Burgos BH
- Drone Hopper–Androni Giocattoli
- Uno-X Pro Cycling Team

UCI Continental Teams

- ARA Pro Racing Sunshine Coast
- China Glory Continental Cycling Team
- Mula Cycling Team
- ProTouch
- Terengganu Polygon Cycling Team
- Thailand Continental Cycling Team
- Team Ukyo

National Teams

- Malaysia
- Philippines
- Thailand

== Route ==
Stage characteristics and winners
Stage	Date	Course	Distance	Type	Stage winner
1	11 October	Kuala Pilah to Kuala Lumpur	157.3 km (97.7 mi)	Hilly stage	Gleb Syritsa
2	12 October	Kuala Klawang to Raub	178.9 km (111.2 mi)	Flat stage	Craig Wiggins (AUS)
3	13 October	Putrajaya to Genting Highlands	123.7 km (76.9 mi)	Mountain stage	Iván Sosa (COL)
4	14 October	Sabak Bernam to Meru Raya	137.9 km (85.7 mi)	Flat stage	Jakub Mareczko (ITA)
5	15 October	Kuala Kangsar to Kulim	172 km (107 mi)	Flat stage	Lionel Taminiaux (BEL)
6	16 October	Georgetown to Alor Setar	120.4 km (74.8 mi)	Flat stage	Erlend Blikra (NOR)
7	17 October	Kuah to Gunung Raya	90.8 km (56.4 mi)	Mountain stage	Sjoerd Bax (NED)
8	18 October	Kuah to Kuah	115.9 km (72.0 mi)	Hilly stage	Alex Molenaar (NED)
Total			1,096.9 km (681.6 mi)		

== Stages ==
=== Stage 1 ===
11 October 2022 — Kuala Pilah to Kuala Lumpur, 157.3 km (97.7 mi)

Stage 1 Result
Rank	Rider	Team	Time
1	Gleb Syritsa	Astana Qazaqstan Team	3h 43' 43"
2	Erlend Blikra (NOR)	Uno-X Pro Cycling Team	+ 0"
3	Max Kanter (GER)	Movistar Team	+ 0"
4	Lionel Taminiaux (BEL)	Alpecin–Deceuninck	+ 0"
5	Marijn van den Berg (NED)	EF Education–EasyPost	+ 0"
6	Reinardt Janse van Rensburg (RSA)	Lotto–Soudal	+ 0"
7	Ryan Gibbons (RSA)	UAE Team Emirates	+ 0"
8	Manuel Peñalver (ESP)	Burgos BH	+ 0"
9	Alex Molenaar (NED)	Burgos BH	+ 0"
10	Sarawut Sirironnachai (THA)	Thailand	+ 0"

General classification after Stage 1
Rank	Rider	Team	Time
1	Gleb Syritsa	Astana Qazaqstan Team	3h 43' 33"
2	Erlend Blikra (NOR)	Uno-X Pro Cycling Team	+ 4"
3	Jambaljamts Sainbayar (MGL)	Terengganu Polygon Cycling Team	+ 4"
4	Peerapol Chawchiangkwang (THA)	Thailand	+ 4"
5	Max Kanter (GER)	Movistar Team	+ 6"
6	Lionel Taminiaux (BEL)	Alpecin–Deceuninck	+ 10"
7	Marijn van den Berg (NED)	EF Education–EasyPost	+ 10"
8	Reinardt Janse van Rensburg (RSA)	Lotto–Soudal	+ 10"
9	Ryan Gibbons (RSA)	UAE Team Emirates	+ 10"
10	Manuel Peñalver (ESP)	Burgos BH	+ 10"

=== Stage 2 ===
12 October 2022 — Kuala Klawang to Raub, 178.9 km (111.2 mi)

Stage 2 Result
Rank	Rider	Team	Time
1	Craig Wiggins (AUS)	ARA Pro Racing Sunshine Coast	4h 09' 20"
2	Gleb Syritsa	Astana Qazaqstan Team	+ 0"
3	Jakub Mareczko (ITA)	Alpecin–Deceuninck	+ 0"
4	Erlend Blikra (NOR)	Uno-X Pro Cycling Team	+ 0"
5	Reinardt Janse van Rensburg (RSA)	Lotto–Soudal	+ 0"
6	Eduard-Michael Grosu (ROU)	Drone Hopper–Androni Giocattoli	+ 0"
7	Max Kanter (GER)	Movistar Team	+ 0"
8	Manuel Peñalver (ESP)	Burgos BH	+ 0"
9	Marijn van den Berg (NED)	EF Education–EasyPost	+ 0"
10	Mohamad Izzat Hilmi Abdul Halil (MAS)	Malaysia	+ 0"

General classification after Stage 2
Rank	Rider	Team	Time
1	Gleb Syritsa	Astana Qazaqstan Team	7h 52' 49"
2	Erlend Blikra (NOR)	Uno-X Pro Cycling Team	+ 8"
3	Jambaljamts Sainbayar (MGL)	Terengganu Polygon Cycling Team	+ 8"
4	Peerapol Chawchiangkwang (THA)	Thailand	+ 8"
5	Max Kanter (GER)	Movistar Team	+ 10"
6	Torstein Træen (NOR)	Uno-X Pro Cycling Team	+ 12"
7	Ryan Gibbons (RSA)	UAE Team Emirates	+ 13"
8	Reinardt Janse van Rensburg (RSA)	Lotto–Soudal	+ 14"
9	Marijn van den Berg (NED)	EF Education–EasyPost	+ 14"
10	Lionel Taminiaux (BEL)	Alpecin–Deceuninck	+ 14"

=== Stage 3 ===
13 October 2022 — Putrajaya to Genting Highlands, 123.7 km (76.9 mi)

Stage 3 Result
Rank	Rider	Team	Time
1	Iván Sosa (COL)	Movistar Team	3h 25' 31"
2	Hugh Carthy (GBR)	EF Education–EasyPost	+ 19"
3	Einer Rubio (COL)	Movistar Team	+ 1' 56"
4	Esteban Chaves (COL)	EF Education–EasyPost	+ 2' 01"
5	Torstein Træen (NOR)	Uno-X Pro Cycling Team	+ 2' 10"
6	Eduardo Sepúlveda (ARG)	Drone Hopper–Androni Giocattoli	+ 2' 14"
7	Rubén Fernández (ESP)	Cofidis	+ 2' 20"
8	Andrey Zeits (KAZ)	Astana Qazaqstan Team	+ 2' 23"
9	Lucas De Rossi (FRA)	China Glory Continental Cycling Team	+ 2' 33"
10	George Bennett (NZL)	UAE Team Emirates	+ 2' 38"

General classification after Stage 3
Rank	Rider	Team	Time
1	Iván Sosa (COL)	Movistar Team	11h 18' 24"
2	Hugh Carthy (GBR)	EF Education–EasyPost	+ 23"
3	Einer Rubio (COL)	Movistar Team	+ 2' 02"
4	Esteban Chaves (COL)	EF Education–EasyPost	+ 2' 11"
5	Torstein Træen (NOR)	Uno-X Pro Cycling Team	+ 2' 18"
6	Eduardo Sepúlveda (ARG)	Drone Hopper–Androni Giocattoli	+ 2' 24"
7	Rubén Fernández (ESP)	Cofidis	+ 2' 30"
8	Andrey Zeits (KAZ)	Astana Qazaqstan Team	+ 2' 33"
9	Lucas De Rossi (FRA)	China Glory Continental Cycling Team	+ 2' 43"
10	Jambaljamts Sainbayar (MGL)	Terengganu Polygon Cycling Team	+ 2' 43"

=== Stage 4 ===
14 October 2022 — Sabak Bernam to Meru Raya, 137.9 km (85.7 mi)

Stage 4 Result
Rank	Rider	Team	Time
1	Jakub Mareczko (ITA)	Movistar Team	3h 15' 37"
2	Rüdiger Selig (GER)	Lotto–Soudal	+ 0"
3	Eduard-Michael Grosu (ROU)	Drone Hopper–Androni Giocattoli	+ 0"
4	Juan Sebastián Molano (COL)	UAE Team Emirates	+ 0"
5	Erlend Blikra (NOR)	Uno-X Pro Cycling Team	+ 0"
6	Max Kanter (GER)	Movistar Team	+ 0"
7	Lionel Taminiaux (BEL)	Alpecin–Deceuninck	+ 0"
8	Gustav Basson (RSA)	ProTouch	+ 0"
9	Marijn van den Berg (NED)	EF Education–EasyPost	+ 0"
10	Manuel Peñalver (ESP)	Burgos BH	+ 0"

General classification after Stage 4
Rank	Rider	Team	Time
1	Iván Sosa (COL)	Movistar Team	14h 34' 01"
2	Hugh Carthy (GBR)	EF Education–EasyPost	+ 23"
3	Einer Rubio (COL)	Movistar Team	+ 2' 02"
4	Esteban Chaves (COL)	EF Education–EasyPost	+ 2' 11"
5	Torstein Træen (NOR)	Uno-X Pro Cycling Team	+ 2' 18"
6	Eduardo Sepúlveda (ARG)	Drone Hopper–Androni Giocattoli	+ 2' 24"
7	Rubén Fernández (ESP)	Cofidis	+ 2' 30"
8	Andrey Zeits (KAZ)	Astana Qazaqstan Team	+ 2' 33"
9	Jambaljamts Sainbayar (MGL)	Terengganu Polygon Cycling Team	+ 2' 34"
10	Lucas De Rossi (FRA)	China Glory Continental Cycling Team	+ 2' 43"

=== Stage 5 ===
15 October 2022 — Kuala Kangsar to Kulim, 172 km (107 mi)

Stage 5 Result
Rank	Rider	Team	Time
1	Lionel Taminiaux (BEL)	Alpecin–Deceuninck	3h 41' 42"
2	Julius van den Berg (NED)	EF Education–EasyPost	+ 0"
3	Carter Bettles (AUS)	ARA Pro Racing Sunshine Coast	+ 4"
4	Ryan Gibbons (RSA)	UAE Team Emirates	+ 9"
5	Max Kanter (GER)	Movistar Team	+ 9"
6	Sylvain Moniquet (BEL)	Lotto–Soudal	+ 9"
7	Gianni Moscon (ITA)	Astana Qazaqstan Team	+ 9"
8	Ander Okamika (ESP)	Burgos BH	+ 9"
9	Sander Armée (BEL)	Cofidis	+ 9"
10	Hugo Toumire (FRA)	Cofidis	+ 13"

General classification after Stage 5
Rank	Rider	Team	Time
1	Iván Sosa (COL)	Movistar Team	18h 16' 21"
2	Hugh Carthy (GBR)	EF Education–EasyPost	+ 23"
3	Einer Rubio (COL)	Movistar Team	+ 2' 02"
4	Esteban Chaves (COL)	EF Education–EasyPost	+ 2' 11"
5	Torstein Træen (NOR)	Uno-X Pro Cycling Team	+ 2' 18"
6	Eduardo Sepúlveda (ARG)	Drone Hopper–Androni Giocattoli	+ 2' 24"
7	Rubén Fernández (ESP)	Cofidis	+ 2' 30"
8	Jambaljamts Sainbayar (MGL)	Terengganu Polygon Cycling Team	+ 2' 32"
9	Andrey Zeits (KAZ)	Astana Qazaqstan Team	+ 2' 33"
10	Lucas De Rossi (FRA)	China Glory Continental Cycling Team	+ 2' 43"

=== Stage 6 ===
16 October 2022 — Georgetown to Alor Setar, 120.4 km (74.8 mi)

Stage 6 Result
Rank	Rider	Team	Time
1	Erlend Blikra (NOR)	Uno-X Pro Cycling Team	2h 49' 42"
2	Gleb Syritsa	Astana Qazaqstan Team	+ 0"
3	Rüdiger Selig (GER)	Lotto–Soudal	+ 0"
4	Juan Sebastián Molano (COL)	UAE Team Emirates	+ 0"
5	Max Kanter (GER)	Movistar Team	+ 0"
6	Alex Molenaar (NED)	Burgos BH	+ 0"
7	Manuel Peñalver (ESP)	Burgos BH	+ 0"
8	Eduard-Michael Grosu (ROU)	Drone Hopper–Androni Giocattoli	+ 0"
9	Marijn van den Berg (NED)	EF Education–EasyPost	+ 0"
10	Jakub Mareczko (ITA)	Alpecin–Deceuninck	+ 0"

General classification after Stage 6
Rank	Rider	Team	Time
1	Iván Sosa (COL)	Movistar Team	21h 06' 03"
2	Hugh Carthy (GBR)	EF Education–EasyPost	+ 23"
3	Einer Rubio (COL)	Movistar Team	+ 2' 02"
4	Esteban Chaves (COL)	EF Education–EasyPost	+ 2' 11"
5	Torstein Træen (NOR)	Uno-X Pro Cycling Team	+ 2' 18"
6	Eduardo Sepúlveda (ARG)	Drone Hopper–Androni Giocattoli	+ 2' 24"
7	Rubén Fernández (ESP)	Cofidis	+ 2' 30"
8	Jambaljamts Sainbayar (MGL)	Terengganu Polygon Cycling Team	+ 2' 32"
9	Andrey Zeits (KAZ)	Astana Qazaqstan Team	+ 2' 33"
10	Lucas De Rossi (FRA)	China Glory Continental Cycling Team	+ 2' 43"

=== Stage 7 ===
17 October 2022 — Kuah to Gunung Raya, 90.8 km (56.4 mi)

Stage 7 Result
Rank	Rider	Team	Time
1	Sjoerd Bax (NED)	Alpecin–Deceuninck	2h 49' 42"
2	Willie Smit (RSA)	China Glory Continental Cycling Team	+ 0"
3	Adrià Moreno (ESP)	Burgos BH	+ 0"
4	David van der Poel (NED)	Alpecin–Deceuninck	+ 10"
5	Gianni Moscon (ITA)	Astana Qazaqstan Team	+ 10"
6	Matteo Jorgenson (USA)	Movistar Team	+ 10"
7	Ion Izagirre (ESP)	Cofidis	+ 10"
8	George Bennett (NZL)	UAE Team Emirates	+ 12"
9	Max Kanter (GER)	Movistar Team	+ 31"
10	Jarrad Drizners (AUS)	Lotto–Soudal	+ 31"

General classification after Stage 7
Rank	Rider	Team	Time
1	Iván Sosa (COL)	Movistar Team	23h 28' 05"
2	Hugh Carthy (GBR)	EF Education–EasyPost	+ 23"
3	Torstein Træen (NOR)	Uno-X Pro Cycling Team	+ 1' 47"
4	George Bennett (NZL)	UAE Team Emirates	+ 1' 50"
5	Einer Rubio (COL)	Movistar Team	+ 2' 02"
6	Esteban Chaves (COL)	EF Education–EasyPost	+ 2' 11"
7	Eduardo Sepúlveda (ARG)	Drone Hopper–Androni Giocattoli	+ 2' 24"
8	Rubén Fernández (ESP)	Cofidis	+ 2' 30"
9	Jambaljamts Sainbayar (MGL)	Terengganu Polygon Cycling Team	+ 2' 32"
10	Andrey Zeits (KAZ)	Astana Qazaqstan Team	+ 2' 33"

=== Stage 8 ===
18 October 2022 — Kuah to Kuah, 115.9 km (72.0 mi)

Stage 8 Result
Rank	Rider	Team	Time
1	Alex Molenaar (NED)	Burgos BH	2h 25' 37"
2	Jason Osborne (GER)	Alpecin–Deceuninck	+ 0"
3	Juan Sebastián Molano (COL)	UAE Team Emirates	+ 18"
4	Erlend Blikra (NOR)	Uno-X Pro Cycling Team	+ 18"
5	Rüdiger Selig (GER)	Lotto–Soudal	+ 18"
6	Max Kanter (GER)	Movistar Team	+ 18"
7	Marijn van den Berg (NED)	EF Education–EasyPost	+ 18"
8	David van der Poel (NED)	Alpecin–Deceuninck	+ 18"
9	Raymond Kreder (NED)	Team Ukyo	+ 18"
10	Ricardo Alejandro Zurita (ESP)	Drone Hopper–Androni Giocattoli	+ 18"

Final general classification
Rank	Rider	Team	Time
1	Iván Sosa (COL)	Movistar Team	25h 54' 00"
2	Hugh Carthy (GBR)	EF Education–EasyPost	+ 23"
3	Torstein Træen (NOR)	Uno-X Pro Cycling Team	+ 1' 47"
4	George Bennett (NZL)	UAE Team Emirates	+ 1' 50"
5	Einer Rubio (COL)	Movistar Team	+ 2' 02"
6	Esteban Chaves (COL)	EF Education–EasyPost	+ 2' 11"
7	Eduardo Sepúlveda (ARG)	Drone Hopper–Androni Giocattoli	+ 2' 24"
8	Rubén Fernández (ESP)	Cofidis	+ 2' 30"
9	Jambaljamts Sainbayar (MGL)	Terengganu Polygon Cycling Team	+ 2' 32"
10	Andrey Zeits (KAZ)	Astana Qazaqstan Team	+ 2' 33"

== Classification leadership table ==
Classification leadership by stage
Stage	Winner	General classification	Points classification	Mountains classification	Asian rider classification	Team classification
1	Gleb Syritsa	Gleb Syritsa	Gleb Syritsa	Jambaljamts Sainbayar	Jambaljamts Sainbayar	Movistar Team
2	Craig Wiggins	Gleb Syritsa	Gleb Syritsa	Nur Aiman Mohd Zariff	Jambaljamts Sainbayar	Uno-X Pro Cycling Team
3	Iván Sosa	Iván Sosa	Gleb Syritsa	Nur Aiman Mohd Zariff	Andrey Zeits	Movistar Team
4	Jakub Mareczko	Iván Sosa	Gleb Syritsa	Nur Aiman Mohd Zariff	Andrey Zeits	Movistar Team
5	Lionel Taminiaux	Iván Sosa	Max Kanter	Nur Aiman Mohd Zariff	Jambaljamts Sainbayar	Movistar Team
6	Erlend Blikra	Iván Sosa	Erlend Blikra	Nur Aiman Mohd Zariff	Jambaljamts Sainbayar	Movistar Team
7	Sjoerd Bax	Iván Sosa	Erlend Blikra	Nur Aiman Mohd Zariff	Jambaljamts Sainbayar	Movistar Team
8	Alex Molenaar	Iván Sosa	Erlend Blikra	Nur Aiman Mohd Zariff	Jambaljamts Sainbayar	Movistar Team
Final		Iván Sosa	Erlend Blikra	Nur Aiman Mohd Zariff	Jambaljamts Sainbayar	Movistar Team

== Current classification standings ==
Legend
Denotes the leader of the general classification	Denotes the leader of the mountains classification
Denotes the leader of the points classification	Denotes the leader of the Asian rider classification

=== General classification ===
Final general classification
Rank	Rider	Team	Time
1	Iván Sosa (COL)	Movistar Team	25h 54' 00"
2	Hugh Carthy (GBR)	EF Education–EasyPost	+ 23"
3	Torstein Træen (NOR)	Uno-X Pro Cycling Team	+ 1' 47"
4	George Bennett (NZL)	UAE Team Emirates	+ 1' 50"
5	Einer Rubio (COL)	Movistar Team	+ 2' 02"
6	Esteban Chaves (COL)	EF Education–EasyPost	+ 2' 11"
7	Eduardo Sepúlveda (ARG)	Drone Hopper–Androni Giocattoli	+ 2' 24"
8	Rubén Fernández (ESP)	Cofidis	+ 2' 30"
9	Jambaljamts Sainbayar (MGL)	Terengganu Polygon Cycling Team	+ 2' 32"
10	Andrey Zeits (KAZ)	Astana Qazaqstan Team	+ 2' 33"

=== Points classification ===
Final points classification
Rank	Rider	Team	Time
1	Erlend Blikra (NOR)	Uno-X Pro Cycling Team	49
2	Max Kanter (GER)	Movistar Team	45
3	Gleb Syritsa	Astana Qazaqstan Team	39
4	Lionel Taminiaux (BEL)	Alpecin–Deceuninck	30
5	Rüdiger Selig (GER)	Lotto–Soudal	27
6	Jakub Mareczko (ITA)	Alpecin–Deceuninck	25
7	Alex Molenaar (NED)	Burgos BH	24
8	Juan Sebastián Molano (COL)	UAE Team Emirates	19
9	Jason Osborne (GER)	Alpecin–Deceuninck	18
10	Jambaljamts Sainbayar (MGL)	Terengganu Polygon Cycling Team	17

=== Mountains classification ===
Final mountains classification
Rank	Rider	Team	Time
1	Nur Aiman Mohd Zariff (MAS)	Terengganu Polygon Cycling Team	29
2	Jambaljamts Sainbayar (MGL)	Terengganu Polygon Cycling Team	29
3	Iván Sosa (COL)	Movistar Team	25
4	Hugh Carthy (GBR)	Alpecin–Deceuninck	24
5	Carter Bettles (AUS)	Lotto–Soudal	22
6	Einer Rubio (COL)	Alpecin–Deceuninck	11
7	Ander Okamika (ESP)	Burgos BH	10
8	Jason Osborne (GER)	Alpecin–Deceuninck	10
9	Esteban Chaves (COL)	EF Education–EasyPost	9
10	Andrey Zeits (KAZ)	Astana Qazaqstan Team	9
