= 2022 Tour of the Alps =

2022 UCI ProSeries

Race details
- Dates: 18–22 April 2022
- Stages: 5
- Distance: 726.5 km (451.4 mi)
- Winning time: 18h 59'29"

Results
| Jersey awarded to the overall winner | Winner | Romain Bardet (FRA) | (Team DSM) |
| | Second | Michael Storer (AUS) | (Groupama–FDJ) |
| | Third | Thymen Arensman (NED) | (Team DSM) |
| Jersey awarded to the mountains classification winner | Mountains | Torstein Træen (NOR) | (Uno-X Pro Cycling Team) |
| Jersey awarded to the youth classification winner | Youth | Thymen Arensman (NED) | (Team DSM) |
| Jersey awarded to the sprints classification winner | Sprints | Thibaut Pinot (FRA) | (Groupama–FDJ) |
| | Team | Groupama–FDJ | |

The 2022 Tour of the Alps was the 45th edition of the Tour of the Alps road cycling stage race and the sixth edition since its renaming from the Giro del Trentino. It was held from 18 to 22 April 2022 in the Austrian state of Tyrol and in the Italian provinces of Trentino and South Tyrol, which all make up the Tyrol–South Tyrol–Trentino Euroregion.

== Teams ==
Ten of the eighteen UCI WorldTeams, seven UCI ProTeams, and one UCI Continental team made up the eighteen teams that participated in the race.

UCI WorldTeams

- AG2R Citroën Team
- Astana Qazaqstan Team
- Bora–Hansgrohe
- EF Education–EasyPost
- Groupama–FDJ
- Ineos Grenadiers
- Israel–Premier Tech
- Movistar Team
- Team Bahrain Victorious
- Team DSM

UCI ProTeams

- Bardiani–CSF–Faizanè
- Caja Rural–Seguros RGA
- Drone Hopper–Androni Giocattoli
- Eolo–Kometa
- Equipo Kern Pharma
- Euskaltel–Euskadi
- Uno-X Pro Cycling Team

UCI Continental Teams

- Tirol KTM Cycling Team

== Route ==
Stage characteristics and winners
| Stage | Date | Route | Distance | Type | Winner |
|---|---|---|---|---|---|
| 1 | 19 April | Cles (Italy) to Primiero San Martino di Castrozza (Italy) | 160.9 km (100.0 mi) | Hilly stage | Geoffrey Bouchard (FRA) |
| 2 | 20 April | Primiero San Martino di Castrozza (Italy) to Lana (Italy) | 154.1 km (95.8 mi) | Hilly stage | Pello Bilbao (ESP) |
| 3 | 21 April | Lana (Italy) to Niederdorf/Villabassa (Italy) | 154.6 km (96.1 mi) | Mountain stage | Lennard Kämna (GER) |
| 4 | 22 April | Niederdorf/Villabassa (Italy) to Kals am Großglockner (Austria) | 142.4 km (88.5 mi) | Mountain stage | Miguel Ángel López (COL) |
| 5 | 23 April | Lienz (Austria) to Lienz (Austria) | 114.5 km (71.1 mi) | Hilly stage | Thibaut Pinot (FRA) |
| Total | | | 726.5 km (451.4 mi) | | |

== Stages ==
=== Stage 1 ===
18 April 2022 — Cles to Primiero San Martino di Castrozza, 160.9 km (100.0 mi)

Stage 1 Result
| Rank | Rider | Team | Time |
|---|---|---|---|
| 1 | Geoffrey Bouchard (FRA) | AG2R Citroën Team | 4h 12' 22" |
| 2 | Pello Bilbao (ESP) | Team Bahrain Victorious | + 5" |
| 3 | Romain Bardet (FRA) | Team DSM | + 5" |
| 4 | Vincenzo Albanese (ITA) | Eolo–Kometa | + 5" |
| 5 | Felix Gall (AUT) | AG2R Citroën Team | + 5" |
| 6 | Natnael Tesfatsion (ERI) | Drone Hopper–Androni Giocattoli | + 5" |
| 7 | Richie Porte (AUS) | Ineos Grenadiers | + 5" |
| 8 | Pavel Sivakov (FRA) | Ineos Grenadiers | + 5" |
| 9 | Michael Storer (AUS) | Groupama–FDJ | + 5" |
| 10 | Jonathan Kléver Caicedo (ECU) | EF Education–EasyPost | + 5" |

General classification after Stage 1
| Rank | Rider | Team | Time |
|---|---|---|---|
| 1 | Geoffrey Bouchard (FRA) | AG2R Citroën Team | 4h 12' 22" |
| 2 | Pello Bilbao (ESP) | Team Bahrain Victorious | + 9" |
| 3 | Romain Bardet (FRA) | Team DSM | + 11" |
| 4 | Vincenzo Albanese (ITA) | Eolo–Kometa | + 15" |
| 5 | Felix Gall (AUT) | AG2R Citroën Team | + 15" |
| 6 | Natnael Tesfatsion (ERI) | Drone Hopper–Androni Giocattoli | + 15" |
| 7 | Richie Porte (AUS) | Ineos Grenadiers | + 15" |
| 8 | Pavel Sivakov (FRA) | Ineos Grenadiers | + 15" |
| 9 | Michael Storer (AUS) | Groupama–FDJ | + 15" |
| 10 | Jonathan Kléver Caicedo (ECU) | EF Education–EasyPost | + 15" |

=== Stage 2 ===
19 April 2022 — Primiero San Martino di Castrozza to Lana, 154.1 km (95.8 mi)

Stage 2 Result
| Rank | Rider | Team | Time |
|---|---|---|---|
| 1 | Pello Bilbao (ESP) | Team Bahrain Victorious | 3h 56' 04" |
| 2 | Romain Bardet (FRA) | Team DSM | + 0" |
| 3 | Attila Valter (HUN) | Groupama–FDJ | + 0" |
| 4 | Felix Gall (AUT) | AG2R Citroën Team | + 0" |
| 5 | Eddie Dunbar (IRL) | Ineos Grenadiers | + 0" |
| 6 | Pavel Sivakov (FRA) | Ineos Grenadiers | + 0" |
| 7 | Esteban Chaves (COL) | EF Education–EasyPost | + 0" |
| 8 | Mikel Landa (ESP) | Team Bahrain Victorious | + 0" |
| 9 | Richie Porte (AUS) | Ineos Grenadiers | + 0" |
| 10 | Einer Rubio (COL) | Movistar Team | + 0" |

General classification after Stage 2
| Rank | Rider | Team | Time |
|---|---|---|---|
| 1 | Pello Bilbao (ESP) | Team Bahrain Victorious | 8h 08' 15" |
| 2 | Romain Bardet (FRA) | Team DSM | + 6" |
| 3 | Attila Valter (HUN) | Groupama–FDJ | + 12" |
| 4 | Felix Gall (AUT) | AG2R Citroën Team | + 16" |
| 5 | Pavel Sivakov (FRA) | Ineos Grenadiers | + 16" |
| 6 | Richie Porte (AUS) | Ineos Grenadiers | + 16" |
| 7 | Esteban Chaves (COL) | EF Education–EasyPost | + 16" |
| 8 | Eddie Dunbar (IRL) | Ineos Grenadiers | + 16" |
| 9 | Einer Rubio (COL) | Movistar Team | + 16" |
| 10 | Santiago Buitrago (COL) | Team Bahrain Victorious | + 16" |

=== Stage 3 ===
20 April 2022 — Lana to Niederdorf/Villabassa, 154.6 km (96.1 mi)

Stage 3 Result
| Rank | Rider | Team | Time |
|---|---|---|---|
| 1 | Lennard Kämna (GER) | Bora–Hansgrohe | 4h 02' 56" |
| 2 | Andrey Amador (CRC) | Ineos Grenadiers | + 3" |
| 3 | Jonathan Lastra (ESP) | Caja Rural–Seguros RGA | + 4" |
| 4 | Natnael Tesfatsion (ERI) | Drone Hopper–Androni Giocattoli | + 4" |
| 5 | Will Barta (USA) | Movistar Team | + 4" |
| 6 | James Piccoli (CAN) | Israel–Premier Tech | + 4" |
| 7 | Vadim Pronskiy (KAZ) | Astana Qazaqstan Team | + 4" |
| 8 | Sean Quinn (USA) | EF Education–EasyPost | + 57" |
| 9 | Felix Gall (AUT) | AG2R Citroën Team | + 57" |
| 10 | Pavel Sivakov (FRA) | Ineos Grenadiers | + 57" |

General classification after Stage 3
| Rank | Rider | Team | Time |
|---|---|---|---|
| 1 | Pello Bilbao (ESP) | Team Bahrain Victorious | 8h 08' 15" |
| 2 | Romain Bardet (FRA) | Team DSM | + 6" |
| 3 | Attila Valter (HUN) | Groupama–FDJ | + 12" |
| 4 | Felix Gall (AUT) | AG2R Citroën Team | + 16" |
| 5 | Pavel Sivakov (FRA) | Ineos Grenadiers | + 16" |
| 6 | Einer Rubio (COL) | Movistar Team | + 16" |
| 7 | Eddie Dunbar (IRL) | Ineos Grenadiers | + 16" |
| 8 | Thymen Arensman (NED) | Team DSM | + 16" |
| 9 | Esteban Chaves (COL) | EF Education–EasyPost | + 16" |
| 10 | Richie Porte (AUS) | Ineos Grenadiers | + 16" |

=== Stage 4 ===
21 April 2022 — Niederdorf/Villabassa to Kals am Großglockner, 142.4 km (88.5 mi)

Stage 4 Result
| Rank | Rider | Team | Time |
|---|---|---|---|
| 1 | Miguel Ángel López (COL) | Astana Qazaqstan Team | 3h 29' 94" |
| 2 | Thibaut Pinot (FRA) | Groupama–FDJ | + 7" |
| 3 | Romain Bardet (FRA) | Team DSM | + 15" |
| 4 | Pello Bilbao (ESP) | Team Bahrain Victorious | + 15" |
| 5 | Felix Gall (AUT) | AG2R Citroën Team | + 15" |
| 6 | Sean Quinn (USA) | EF Education–EasyPost | + 15" |
| 7 | Santiago Buitrago (COL) | Team Bahrain Victorious | + 15" |
| 8 | Mikel Landa (ESP) | Team Bahrain Victorious | + 15" |
| 9 | Thymen Arensman (NED) | Team DSM | + 15" |
| 10 | Attila Valter (HUN) | Groupama–FDJ | + 15" |

General classification after Stage 4
| Rank | Rider | Team | Time |
|---|---|---|---|
| 1 | Pello Bilbao (ESP) | Team Bahrain Victorious | 15h 41' 27" |
| 2 | Romain Bardet (FRA) | Team DSM | + 6" |
| 3 | Attila Valter (HUN) | Groupama–FDJ | + 12" |
| 4 | Felix Gall (AUT) | AG2R Citroën Team | + 16" |
| 5 | Pavel Sivakov (FRA) | Ineos Grenadiers | + 16" |
| 6 | Einer Rubio (COL) | Movistar Team | + 16" |
| 7 | Thymen Arensman (NED) | Team DSM | + 16" |
| 8 | Santiago Buitrago (COL) | Team Bahrain Victorious | + 16" |
| 9 | Richie Porte (AUS) | Ineos Grenadiers | + 16" |
| 10 | Michael Storer (AUS) | Groupama–FDJ | + 16" |

=== Stage 5 ===
22 April 2022 — Lienz to Lienz, 114.5 km (71.1 mi)

Stage 5 Result
| Rank | Rider | Team | Time |
|---|---|---|---|
| 1 | Thibaut Pinot (FRA) | Groupama–FDJ | 3h 09' 24" |
| 2 | David De La Cruz (ESP) | Astana Qazaqstan Team | + 7" |
| 3 | Lennard Kämna (GER) | Bora–Hansgrohe | + 1' 46" |
| 4 | Igor Arrieta (ESP) | Equipo Kern Pharma | + 2' 43" |
| 5 | Torstein Træen (NOR) | Uno-X Pro Cycling Team | + 3' 26" |
| 6 | Andrey Amador (CRC) | Ineos Grenadiers | + 8' 09" |
| 7 | Romain Bardet (FRA) | Team DSM | + 8' 36" |
| 8 | Michael Storer (AUS) | Groupama–FDJ | + 8' 36" |
| 9 | Thymen Arensman (NED) | Team DSM | + 8' 38" |
| 10 | Attila Valter (HUN) | Groupama–FDJ | + 9' 15" |

General classification after Stage 5
| Rank | Rider | Team | Time |
|---|---|---|---|
| 1 | Romain Bardet (FRA) | Team DSM | 18h 59' 29" |
| 2 | Michael Storer (AUS) | Groupama–FDJ | + 14" |
| 3 | Thymen Arensman (NED) | Team DSM | + 16" |
| 4 | Pello Bilbao (ESP) | Team Bahrain Victorious | + 37" |
| 5 | Attila Valter (HUN) | Groupama–FDJ | + 49" |
| 6 | Felix Gall (AUT) | AG2R Citroën Team | + 53" |
| 7 | Richie Porte (AUS) | Ineos Grenadiers | + 1' 00" |
| 8 | Santiago Buitrago (COL) | Team Bahrain Victorious | + 1' 57" |
| 9 | Hugh Carthy (GBR) | EF Education–EasyPost | + 2' 08" |
| 10 | Pavel Sivakov (FRA) | Ineos Grenadiers | + 2' 13" |

== Classification leadership table ==
Classification leadership by stage
| Stage | Winner | General classification | Mountains classification | Young rider classification | Sprints classification | Team classification |
|---|---|---|---|---|---|---|
| 1 | Geoffrey Bouchard | Geoffrey Bouchard | Geoffrey Bouchard | Natnael Tesfatsion | Emanuel Zangerle | AG2R Citroën Team |
| 2 | Pello Bilbao | Pello Bilbao | Pavel Sivakov | Santiago Buitrago | Miguel Ángel López | Ineos Grenadiers |
| 3 | Lennard Kämna | Pello Bilbao | Pavel Sivakov | Thymen Arensman | Miguel Ángel López | Ineos Grenadiers |
| 4 | Miguel Ángel López | Pello Bilbao | Geoffrey Bouchard | Thymen Arensman | Miguel Ángel López | Ineos Grenadiers |
| 5 | Thibaut Pinot | Romain Bardet | Torstein Træen | Thymen Arensman | Thibaut Pinot | Groupama–FDJ |
| Final | | Romain Bardet | Torstein Træen | Thymen Arensman | Thibaut Pinot | Groupama–FDJ |

- On stage 2, Ben Zwiehoff, who was second in the mountains classification, wore the light blue jersey, because first-placed Geoffrey Bouchard wore the green jersey as the leader of the general classification.

== Final classification standings ==
Legend
| Denotes the leader of the general classification | Denotes the leader of the young rider classification |
| Denotes the leader of the mountains classification | Denotes the leader of the sprints classification |

=== General classification ===
Final general classification (1–10)
| Rank | Rider | Team | Time |
|---|---|---|---|
| 1 | Romain Bardet (FRA) | Team DSM | 18h 59' 29" |
| 2 | Michael Storer (AUS) | Groupama–FDJ | + 14" |
| 3 | Thymen Arensman (NED) | Team DSM | + 16" |
| 4 | Pello Bilbao (ESP) | Team Bahrain Victorious | + 37" |
| 5 | Attila Valter (HUN) | Groupama–FDJ | + 49" |
| 6 | Felix Gall (AUT) | AG2R Citroën Team | + 53" |
| 7 | Richie Porte (AUS) | Ineos Grenadiers | +1' 00" |
| 8 | Santiago Buitrago (COL) | Team Bahrain Victorious | +1' 57" |
| 9 | Hugh Carthy (GBR) | EF Education–EasyPost | +2' 08" |
| 10 | Pavel Sivakov (FRA) | Ineos Grenadiers | +2' 13" |

=== Mountains classification ===
Final mountains classification (1–10)
| Rank | Rider | Team | Points |
|---|---|---|---|
| 1 | Torstein Træen (NOR) | Uno-X Pro Cycling Team | 20 |
| 2 | David De La Cruz (ESP) | Astana Qazaqstan Team | 16 |
| 3 | Geoffrey Bouchard (FRA) | AG2R Citroën Team | 15 |
| 4 | Pavel Sivakov (FRA) | Ineos Grenadiers | 12 |
| 5 | Thibaut Pinot (FRA) | Groupama–FDJ | 10 |
| 6 | Thibaut Pinot (FRA) | Groupama–FDJ | 10 |
| 7 | Lennard Kämna (GER) | Bora–Hansgrohe | 10 |
| 8 | Unai Iribar (ESP) | Euskaltel–Euskadi | 9 |
| 9 | Thymen Arensman (NED) | Team DSM | 8 |
| 10 | Miguel Ángel López (COL) | Astana Qazaqstan Team | 8 |

=== Young rider classification ===
Final young rider classification (1–10)
| Rank | Rider | Team | Time |
|---|---|---|---|
| 1 | Thymen Arensman (NED) | Team DSM | 18h 59' 45" |
| 2 | Santiago Buitrago (COL) | Team Bahrain Victorious | +1' 41" |
| 3 | Lenny Martinez (FRA) | Groupama–FDJ | +2' 58" |
| 4 | Sean Quinn (USA) | EF Education–EasyPost | +3' 00" |
| 5 | Cian Uijtdebroeks (BEL) | Bora–Hansgrohe | +3'00" |
| 6 | Natnael Tesfatsion (ERI) | Drone Hopper–Androni Giocattoli | + 7' 57" |
| 7 | Florian Lipowitz (GER) | Tirol KTM Cycling Team | + 13' 40" |
| 8 | Magnus Kulset (NOR) | Uno-X Pro Cycling Team | + 15' 11" |
| 9 | Abner González (PUR) | Movistar Team | + 17' 12" |
| 10 | Reuben Thompson (NZL) | Groupama–FDJ | + 18' 31" |

=== Sprints classification ===
Final sprints classification (1–8)
| Rank | Rider | Team | Points |
|---|---|---|---|
| 1 | Thibaut Pinot (FRA) | Groupama–FDJ | 10 |
| 2 | Miguel Ángel López (COL) | Astana Qazaqstan Team | 6 |
| 3 | David De La Cruz (ESP) | Astana Qazaqstan Team | 6 |
| 4 | Anton Palzer (GER) | Bora–Hansgrohe | 6 |
| 5 | Chris Hamilton (AUS) | Team DSM | 4 |
| 6 | Nicolas Prodhomme (FRA) | AG2R Citroën Team | 4 |
| 7 | Vadim Pronskiy (KAZ) | Astana Qazaqstan Team | 4 |
| 8 | Asier Etxeberria (ESP) | Euskaltel–Euskadi | 4 |

=== Team classification ===
Final team classification (1–10)
| Rank | Team | Time |
|---|---|---|
| 1 | Groupama–FDJ | 56h 51' 08" |
| 2 | Ineos Grenadiers | + 10' 04" |
| 3 | Team Bahrain Victorious | + 12' 05" |
| 4 | EF Education–EasyPost | + 17' 50" |
| 5 | Team DSM | + 19' 04" |
| 6 | Astana Qazaqstan Team | + 24' 30" |
| 7 | Movistar Team | + 32' 24" |
| 8 | AG2R Citroën Team | + 38' 25" |
| 9 | Bora–Hansgrohe | + 45' 10" |
| 10 | Euskaltel–Euskadi | +1h 00' 19" |
