= Torstein Træen =

Norwegian cyclist

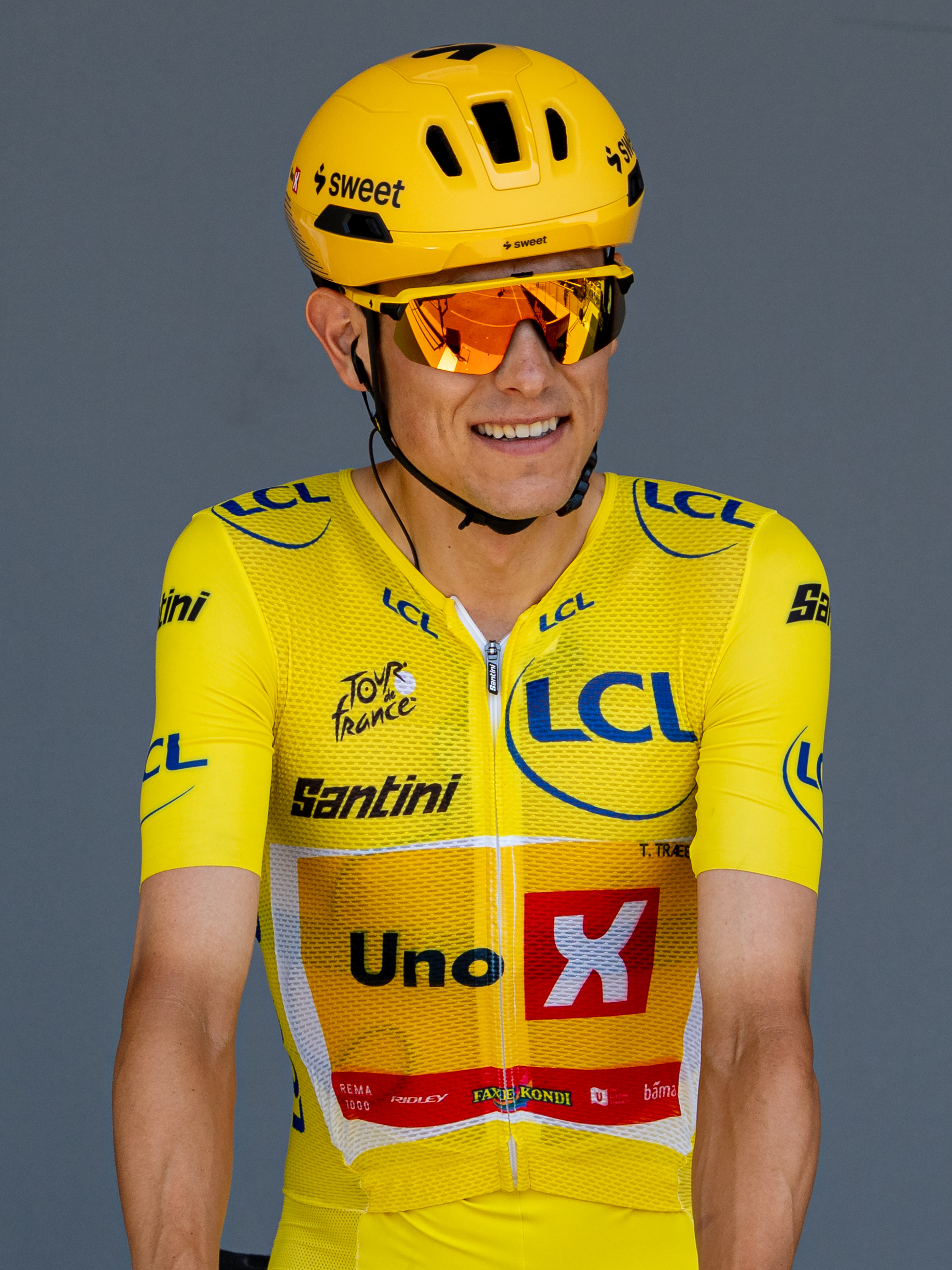
- Træen wearing the yellow jersey at the 2026 Tour de France

Personal information
- Full name: Torstein Træen
- Born: 16 July 1995 (age 31) Hønefoss, Norway
- Height: 1.81 m (5 ft 11 in)

Cycling career
- Sport: Cycling
- Current team: Uno-X Mobility
- Discipline: Road
- Role: Rider
- Rider type: Climber

Amateur team
- 2014–2015: Ringerike SK

Professional teams
- 2015–2023: Team Ringeriks–Kraft
- 2024–2025: Team Bahrain Victorious
- 2026–: Uno-X Mobility

Torstein Træen (born 16 July 1995) is a Norwegian racing cyclist, who currently rides for UCI WorldTeam Uno-X Pro Cycling Team.

== Career ==
Træen joined UCI Continental team Team Ringeriks–Kraft in 2015. He competed in the men's team time trial event at the 2017 UCI Road World Championships.

In 2022, Træen placed ninth overall at the Volta a Catalunya followed by a strong performance at the Tour of the Alps, winning the mountains classification and placing fifth on the final stage. However, soon after the race, he was found to have testicular cancer, detected in a doping control test which revealed the presence of hCG in his blood. He was able to return to competition in August and soon returned to form, obtaining a seventh place overall at the CRO Race and third place at the Tour de Langkawi.

In 2023, he competed in his first Tour de France following an 8th place finish at the Critérium du Dauphiné. However, he crashed on stage one and broke his elbow, but elected to continue the race and ultimately finished in 95th overall.

After nine seasons with the Uno-X Pro Cycling Team, he joined UCI WorldTeam Team Bahrain Victorious for the 2024 season. In June, he took his first pro win on stage four of the Tour de Suisse in a solo victory.

Træen took part in the 2025 Vuelta a España. He took the red jersey on Stage 6 of the race after joining the day's breakaway, finishing in second place on the stage behind Jay Vine. He lost the jersey to Jonas Vingegaard on Stage 10, and finished the race in ninth place in the General Classification.

Traeen rejoined UCI WorldTeam Uno-X Pro Cycling Team signing for the 2026 and 2027 seasons. In the 2026 Tour de France Traeen finished stage 4 in 8th place and went into the overall lead and wore the yellow jersey in stages 5 and 6. During stage 6, while in the yellow jersey, he crashed into his own teammate on a hairpin turn, and had to abandon the Tour at the end of that stage.

== Major results ==
2017
2nd Road race, National Under-23 Road Championships
7th Skive–Løbet
2018
2nd Overall International Tour of Rhodes
2019
1st Active rider classification, Danmark Rundt
1st Mountains classification, Oberösterreichrundfahrt
2020
2nd Lillehammer GP
2nd Overall Tour of Małopolska

1st Stage 3

5th Road race, National Road Championships
7th Overall International Tour of Rhodes

1st Mountains classification

9th Overall Tour Colombia
2021
5th Overall Tour Alsace
5th Boucles de l'Aulne
9th Overall Tour of Norway
10th Overall Arctic Race of Norway
2022
1st Mountains classification, Tour of the Alps
3rd Overall Tour de Langkawi
7th Overall CRO Race
9th Overall Volta a Catalunya
2023
8th Overall Critérium du Dauphiné
8th Veneto Classic
10th Overall Tour of the Alps
10th Overall Tour des Alpes-Maritimes et du Var
2024 (1 pro win)
1st Stage 4 Tour de Suisse
2025
7th Overall Vuelta a Burgos
9th Overall Vuelta a España

Held after Stages 6–9

2026
5th Road race, National Road Championships
Tour de France

Held after Stages 4–5

=== Grand Tour general classification results timeline ===
Grand Tour	2023	2024	2025	2026
Giro d'Italia	—	DNF	—	—
Tour de France	95	—	—	DNF
Vuelta a España	—	60	9	

Legend
—	Did not compete
DNF	Did not finish
IP	Race in Progress
