= Craig Wiggins =

Australian cyclist

Personal information
- Born: 28 May 1999 (age 27) Albany, Western Australia

Cycling career
- Sport: Cycling
- Current team: ARA Skip Capital
- Discipline: Road
- Role: Rider
- Rider type: Sprinter

Amateur team
- 2017: Mobius Future Racing

Professional teams
- 2018: Mobius–BridgeLane
- 2019–2020: St George Continental Cycling Team
- 2021–: ARA Pro Racing Sunshine Coast

Craig Wiggins (born 28 May 1999) is an Australian cyclist, who currently rides for UCI Continental team ARA Skip Capital. He previously competed for UCI Continental team St George Continental Cycling Team.

== Career ==
Wiggins is a survivor of a hit-and-run accident that occurred while training.

At the 2022 Tour de Langkawi, he won the 2nd stage; this victory came 5 hours after the initial winner, Juan Sebastián Molano, was disqualified for an irregular sprint due to a hand infraction.

== Major results ==
2017
3rd Road race, Oceania Junior Road Championships
2022
1st Stage 2 Tour de Langkawi
