= Marijn van den Berg =

Dutch cyclist

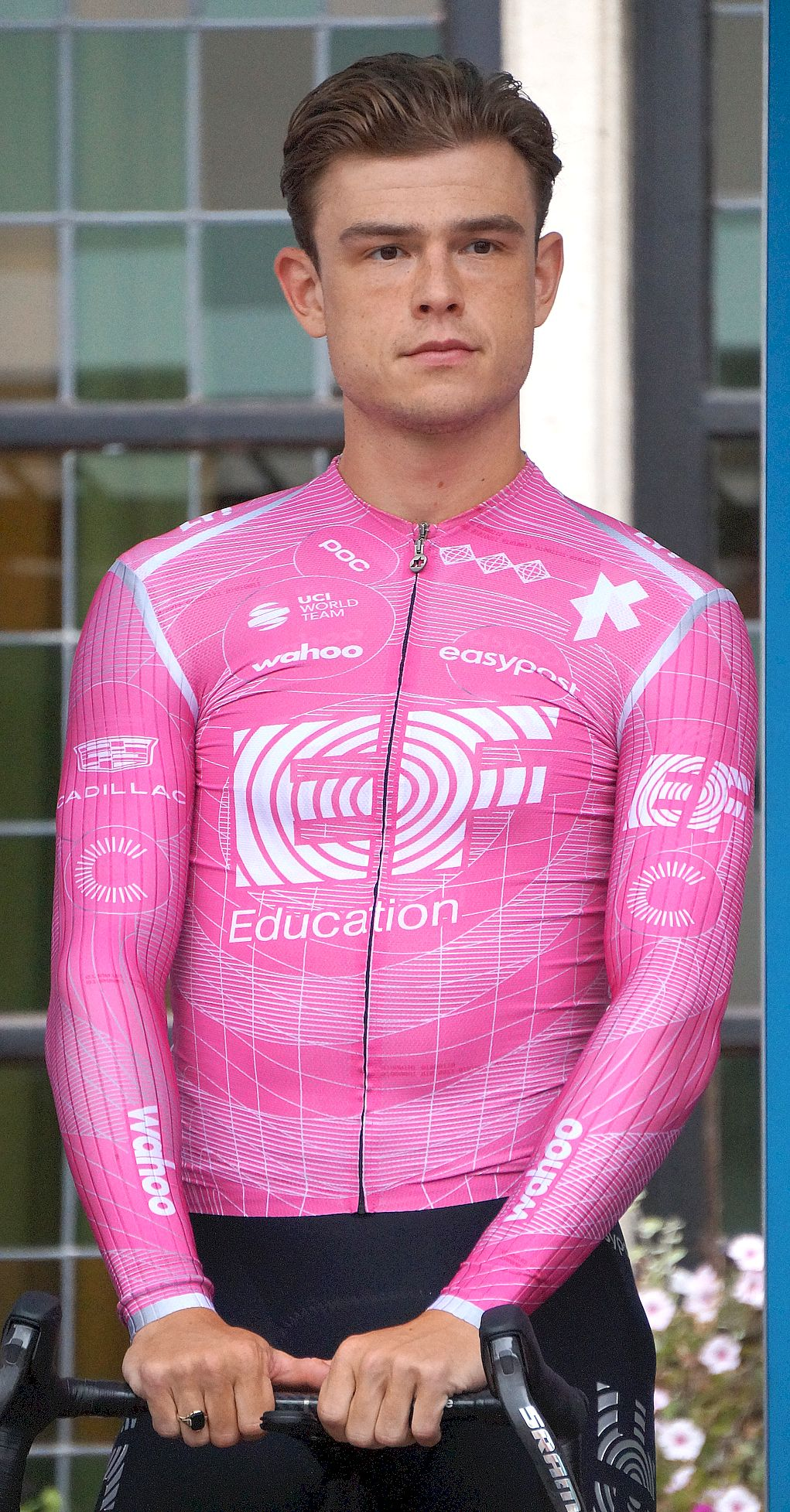
- Van den Berg in 2026

Personal information
- Born: 19 July 1999 (age 27) De Meern, Netherlands
- Height: 1.82 m (6 ft 0 in)
- Weight: 73 kg (161 lb)

Cycling career
- Sport: Cycling
- Current team: EF Education–EasyPost
- Discipline: Road
- Role: Rider
- Rider type: Sprinter, puncheur

Professional teams
- 2018: Delta Cycling Rotterdam
- 2019–2020: Metec–TKH
- 2021: Équipe Continentale Groupama–FDJ
- 2022–: EF Education–EasyPost

Marijn van den Berg (born 19 July 1999) is a Dutch cyclist who currently rides for UCI WorldTeam EF Education–EasyPost. His brother Lars is also a cyclist. Van den Berg is a sprinter who tends to perform best on sprints when the race also involves some climbing.

== Major results ==
2017
2nd E3 Harelbeke Junioren
6th La route des Géants
7th Gent–Wevelgem Juniors
8th Aubel–Thimister–La Gleize
10th Nokere Koerse Juniores
10th Grand Prix Bati-Metallo
2018
5th Overall Olympia's Tour

1st Stage 6

9th Slag om Norg
2019
1st Overall Carpathian Couriers Race

1st Points classification
1st Young rider classification
1st Stage 2

3rd Road race, National Under-23 Road Championships
10th Overall Czech Cycling Tour
2020
1st Stage 1 Orlen Nations Grand Prix
2021
1st Overall Orlen Nations Grand Prix

1st Stages 1 & 2

1st GP Adria Mobil
Tour de l'Avenir

1st Points classification
1st Stages 2 (TTT), 3 & 5

1st Stage 1 Alpes Isère Tour
3rd Time trial, National Under-23 Road Championships
3rd Overall A Travers les Hauts de France

1st Young rider classification

3rd Paris–Tours Espoirs
4th Overall L'Étoile d'Or
5th Overall Kreiz Breizh Elites
8th Road race, UEC European Under-23 Road Championships
2022
7th Clásica de Almería
7th Grand Prix de Wallonie
10th Coppa Bernocchi
2023 (3 pro wins)
1st Trofeo Ses Salines–Alcúdia
Route d'Occitanie

1st Points classification
1st Stage 1

1st Stage 5 Tour de Pologne
3rd Figueira Champions Classic
8th Overall Région Pays de la Loire Tour

1st Points classification

10th Classic Brugge–De Panne
2024 (4)
1st Overall Région Pays de la Loire Tour

1st Points classification
1st Stages 1 & 4

1st Stage 4 Volta a Catalunya
3rd Trofeo Palma
4th Trofeo Ses Salines–Felanitx
7th Brabantse Pijl
7th Figueira Champions Classic
10th Overall Boucles de la Mayenne
10th Coppa Bernocchi
2025 (2)
1st Trofeo Ses Salines
1st Stage 2 Route d'Occitanie
3rd Overall Tour de la Provence
7th Kuurne–Brussels–Kuurne
8th Overall Boucles de la Mayenne
9th Omloop Het Nieuwsblad
9th Maryland Cycling Classic
2026 (1)
1st Stage 2 Tour de Luxembourg
9th Circuit Franco-Belge

=== Grand Tour general classification results timeline ===
Grand Tour	2023	2024	2025
Giro d'Italia	—	—	—
Tour de France	—	109	DNF
Vuelta a España	126	—	

Legend
—	Did not compete
DNF	Did not finish
