= Buniel =

Coordinates: 42°19′N 3°49′W

- Municipality and town
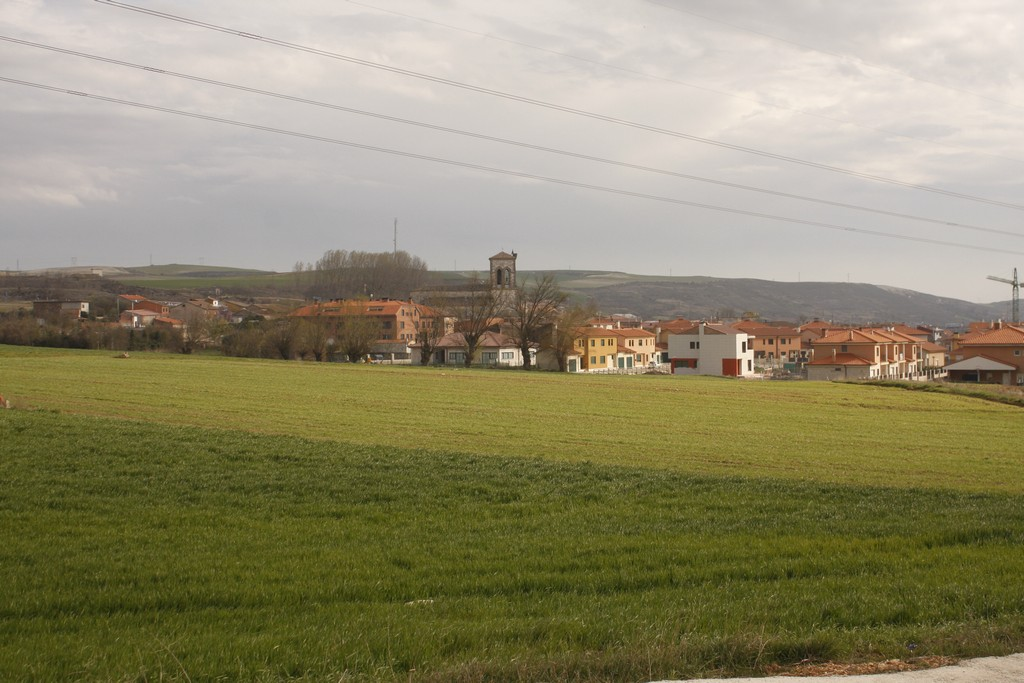
- View of Buniel, 2010

- Coat of arms
- Interactive map of Buniel
- Country: Spain
- Autonomous community: Castile and León
- Province: Burgos
- Comarca: Alfoz de Burgos
- Founded: 890

Area
  - Total: 13 km^{2} (5.0 sq mi)
- Elevation: 837 m (2,746 ft)

Population (2025-01-01)
  - Total: 632
  - Density: 49/km^{2} (130/sq mi)
- Time zone: UTC+1 (CET)
  - Summer (DST): UTC+2 (CEST)
- Postal code: 09230
- Website: http://www.buniel.es/

Buniel is a municipality and town located in the province of Burgos, Castilla y León, Spain. According to the 2004 census (INE), the municipality has a population of 231 inhabitants. Near the town was a housing estate, Soto del Real, which, following its developers bankruptcy in 2008, was abandoned and became a tourist attraction as "Urbanización Abandonada Buniel".
