= Nistos =

- Commune
- Coat of arms
- Location of Nistos
- Location within France Location within Occitanie
- Coordinates: 43°01′05″N 0°28′48″E
- Country: France
- Region: Occitania
- Department: Hautes-Pyrénées
- Arrondissement: Bagnères-de-Bigorre
- Canton: La Vallée de la Barousse
- Intercommunality: Neste Barousse

Government
  - Mayor (2020–2026): Fernand Campan
- Area^{1}: 32.59 km^{2} (12.58 sq mi)
- Elevation: 640 m (2,100 ft)
- Highest elevation: 1,853 m (6,079 ft)
- Lowest elevation: 520 m (1,710 ft)
- Population (2023): 212
  - Density: 6.51/km^{2} (16.8/sq mi)
- Time zone: UTC+01:00 (CET)
  - Summer (DST): UTC+02:00 (CEST)
- INSEE/Postal code: 65329 /65150
- ^{1} French Land Register data, which excludes lakes, ponds, glaciers > 1 km^{2} (0.386 sq mi or 247 acres) and river estuaries.

Nistos (French pronunciation: [nistɔs]; Occitan: Nistòs) is a commune in the Hautes-Pyrénées department in south-western France.

== See also ==
- Communes of the Hautes-Pyrénées department
