= Einer Rubio =

Colombian cyclist (born 1998)

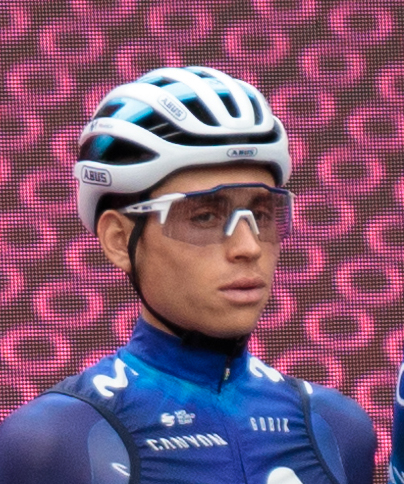
- Rubio at the 2023 Giro d'Italia

Personal information
- Full name: Einer Augusto Rubio Reyes
- Nickname: The Backpack
- Born: 22 February 1998 (age 28) Chíquiza, Colombia
- Height: 1.64 m (5 ft 5 in)
- Weight: 56 kg (123 lb)

Cycling career
- Sport: Cycling
- Current team: Movistar Team
- Discipline: Road
- Role: Rider
- Rider type: Climber

Amateur team
- 2017–2019: Vejus TMF

Professional team
- 2020–: Movistar Team

Major wins
- Grand Tours Giro d'Italia 1 individual stage (2023)

Einer Augusto Rubio Reyes (born 22 February 1998 in Chíquiza) is a Colombian cyclist, who currently rides for UCI WorldTeam Movistar Team. He made his Grand Tour debut at the 2020 Giro d'Italia, where he finished 58th in the general classification. As of mid-2026, his best general classification result at a Grand Tour was at the 2024 Giro d'Italia, where he placed seventh. A climber, Rubio won stage 13 of the 2023 Giro d'Italia.

On stage 19 of the 2026 Tour de France, Rubio crashed into the back of a UAE Team Emirates XRG team car after it was forced to abruptly stop due to fans, several kilometers from the summit of the Alpe d'Huez. He was forced to withdraw from the race, and received stitches in his face.

== Major results ==
2017
10th Giro del Medio Brenta
2018
1st GP Capodarco
1st Stage 5 Giro Ciclistico d'Italia
4th Overall Giro del Friuli-Venezia Giulia

1st Mountains classification
1st Stage 2

4th Overall Giro della Valle d'Aosta
8th Giro del Medio Brenta
2019
2nd Overall Giro Ciclistico d'Italia

1st Mountains classification
1st Stage 9

4th Giro del Medio Brenta
4th Trofeo Città di San Vendemiano
6th Piccolo Giro di Lombardia
6th Giro del Belvedere
2021
5th Overall Vuelta Asturias
7th Overall Vuelta a Burgos

1st Young rider classification

2022
4th Giro della Toscana
5th Overall Tour de Langkawi
10th Overall Tour de Romandie
2023 (2 pro wins)
1st Stage 13 Giro d'Italia
1st Stage 3 UAE Tour
2nd Overall Vuelta a Asturias
4th Overall Vuelta a San Juan
4th Overall Route d'Occitanie
5th Overall Vuelta a Burgos
2024
7th Overall Giro d'Italia
2025
5th Milano–Torino
8th Overall Giro d'Italia

=== Grand Tour general classification results timeline ===
Grand Tour	2020	2021	2022	2023	2024	2025	2026
Giro d'Italia	58	39	—	11	7	8	23
Tour de France	—	—	—	—	—	31	DNF
Vuelta a España	—	—	—	16	27	—	

Legend
—	Did not compete
DNF	Did not finish
