= Tardajos =

- Municipality and town
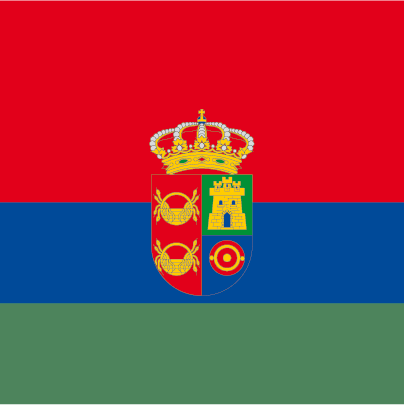
- Flag Coat of arms
- Interactive map of Tardajos
- Coordinates: 42°21′N 3°49′W
- Country: Spain
- Autonomous community: Castile and León
- Province: Burgos
- Municipality: Tardajos
- Comarca: Alfoz de Burgos

Area
  - Total: 12 km^{2} (4.6 sq mi)
- Elevation: 827 m (2,713 ft)

Population (2025-01-01)
  - Total: 862
  - Density: 72/km^{2} (190/sq mi)
- Time zone: UTC+1 (CET)
  - Summer (DST): UTC+2 (CEST)
- Postal code: 09130
- Website: www.tardajos.es

Tardajos is a municipality and town located in the province of Burgos, Castile and León, Spain. According to the 2014 census (INE), the municipality has a population of 950 inhabitants.

== History ==
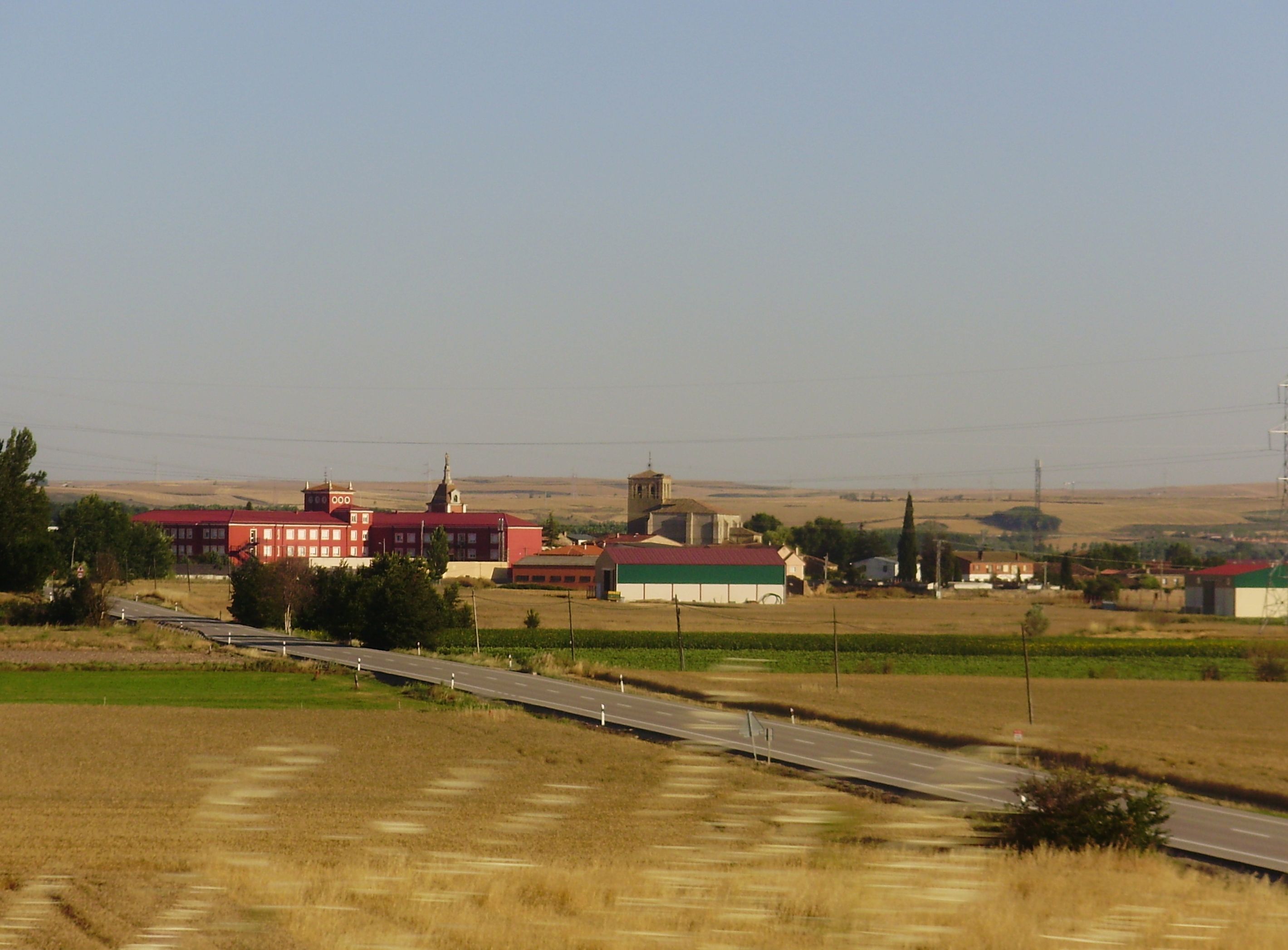
View of Tardajos

Tardajos received a fuero from Count Pedro González de Lara and Countess Eva in 1127. It was re-issued with adjustments on three subsequent occasions by either Pedro or Eva, the last being in 1147.
