= Cilleruelo de Abajo =

Coordinates: 41°53′N 3°47′W

- Municipality
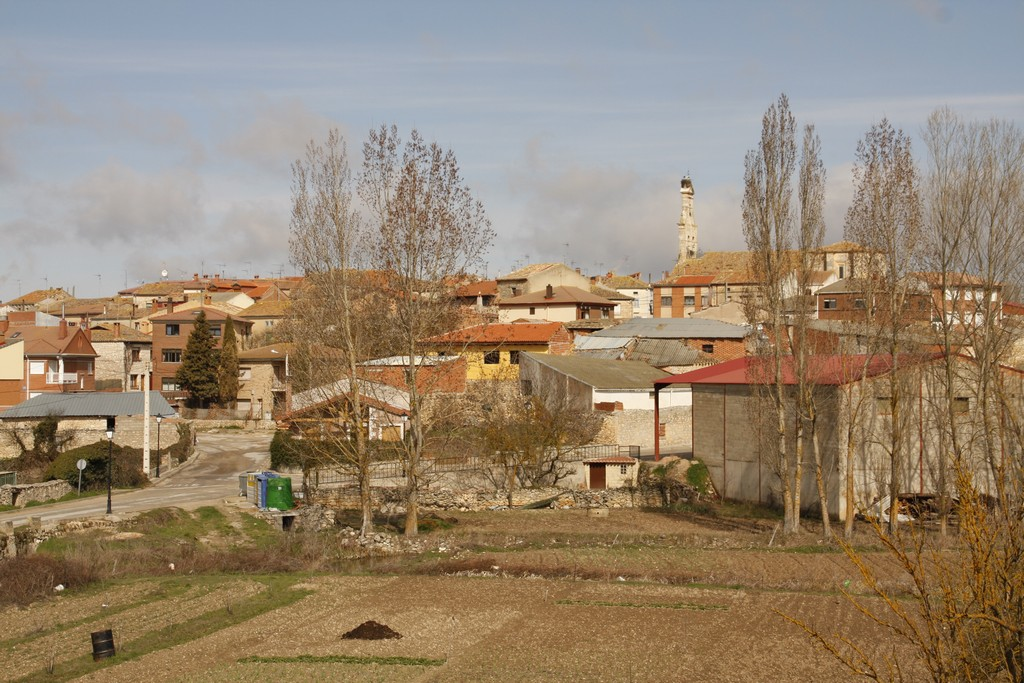
- View of Cilleruelo de Abajo, 2010

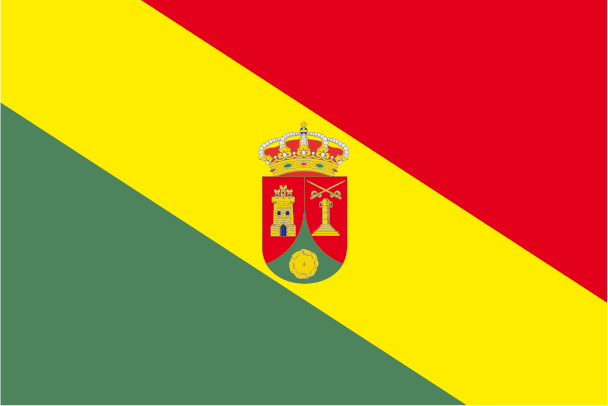
- Flag Coat of arms
- Interactive map of Cilleruelo de Abajo
- Country: Spain
- Autonomous community: Castile and León
- Province: Burgos
- Comarca: Arlanza

Area
  - Total: 48 km^{2} (19 sq mi)
- Elevation: 965 m (3,166 ft)

Population (2025-01-01)
  - Total: 209
  - Density: 4.4/km^{2} (11/sq mi)
- Time zone: UTC+1 (CET)
  - Summer (DST): UTC+2 (CEST)
- Postal code: 09349
- Website: http://www.cilleruelodeabajo.es/

Cilleruelo de Abajo is a municipality located in the province of Burgos, Castile and León, Spain. According to the 2004 census (INE), the municipality has a population of 298 inhabitants.
