= Carlos García Pierna =

Spanish cyclist

Carlos García
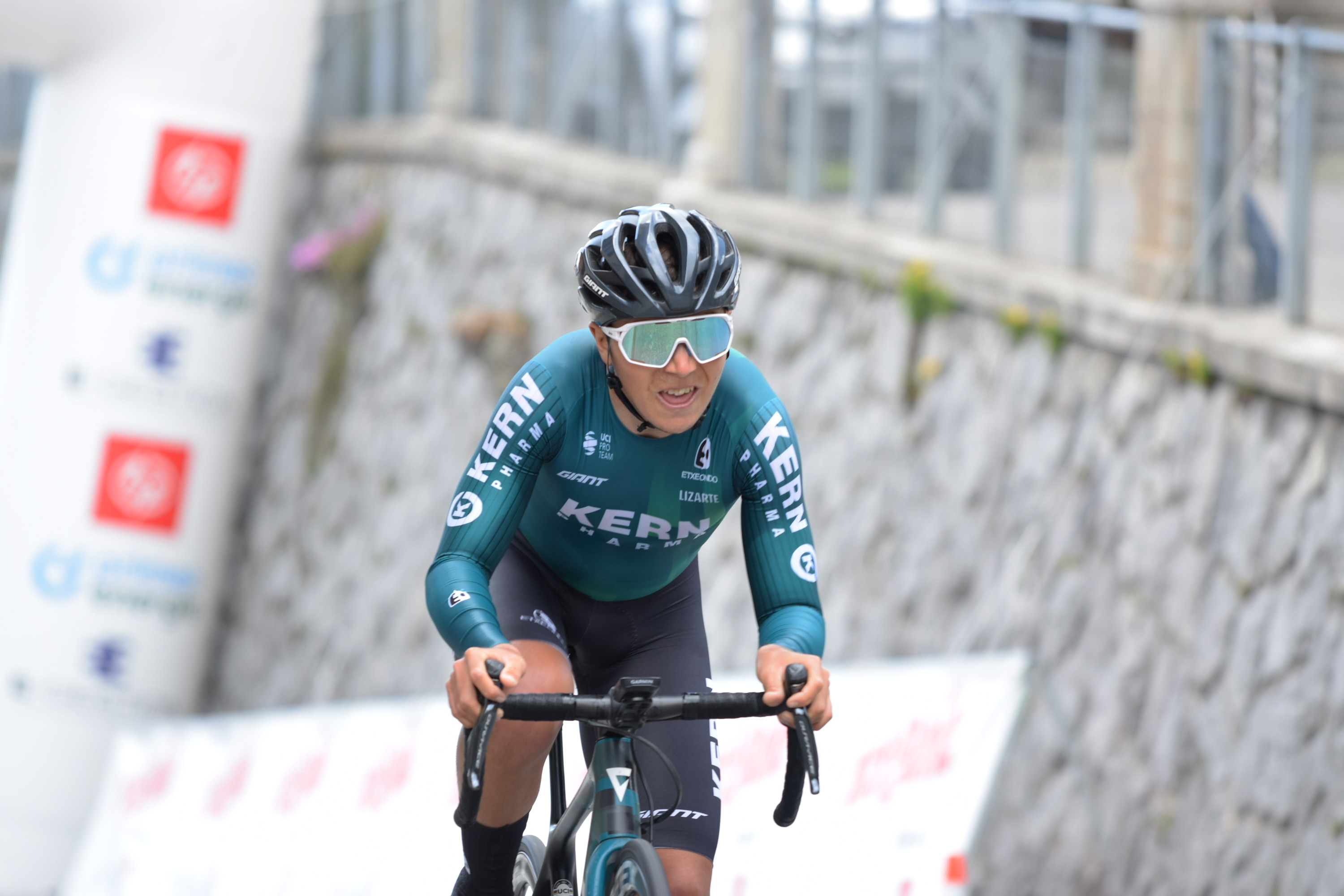
- García at 2022 Tour de Romandie

Personal information
- Full name: Carlos García Pierna
- Born: 23 July 1999 (age 27) Tres Cantos, Spain
- Height: 1.71 m (5 ft 7 in)
- Weight: 54 kg (119 lb)

Cycling career
- Sport: Cycling
- Current team: Burgos Burpellet BH
- Discipline: Road
- Role: Rider
- Rider type: Climber

Amateur teams
- 2016–2019: Polartec–Fundación Contador
- 2020: Caja Rural–Seguros RGA amateur

Professional teams
- 2020: Caja Rural–Seguros RGA (stagiaire)
- 2021–2024: Equipo Kern Pharma
- 2025–: Burgos Burpellet BH

Carlos García Pierna (born 23 July 1999) is a Spanish cyclist who currently rides for UCI ProTeam Burgos Burpellet BH. His brother Raúl also competes as a professional cyclist, and their father Félix García Casas is a former professional cyclist.

== Major results ==
2017
5th Overall Ain Bugey Valromey Tour
2018
5th Road race, National Under-23 Road Championships
2023
1st Mountains classification, Route d'Occitanie
2024
1st Mountains classification, GP Beiras e Serra da Estrela
5th Clásica Terres de l'Ebre
2025
1st Mountains classification, Vuelta a Burgos
