= Busto de Bureba =

Coordinates: 42°40′N 3°16′W

- Municipality and town
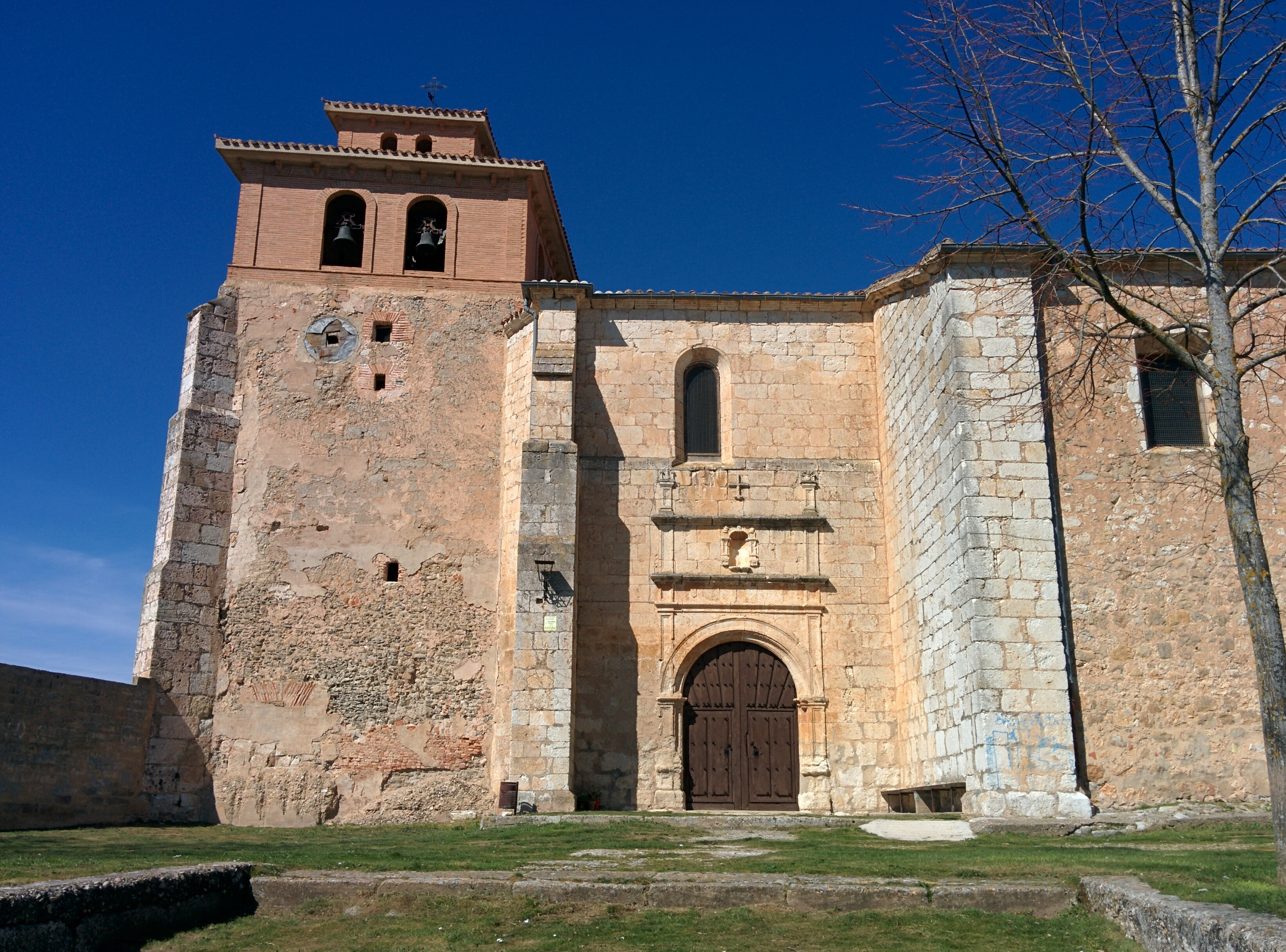
- Church of San Martín

- Flag Coat of arms

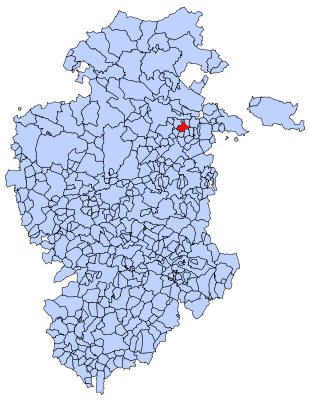
- Municipal location of Busto de Bureba in Burgos province
- Country: Spain
- Autonomous community: Castile and León
- Province: Burgos
- Comarca: La Bureba

Area
  - Total: 19 km^{2} (7.3 sq mi)
- Elevation: 728 m (2,388 ft)

Population (2025-01-01)
  - Total: 140
  - Density: 7.4/km^{2} (19/sq mi)
- Time zone: UTC+1 (CET)
  - Summer (DST): UTC+2 (CEST)
- Postal code: 09244
- Website: http://www.bustodebureba.es/

Busto de Bureba is a municipality and town located in the province of Burgos, Castile and León, Spain. According to the 2025 census (INE), the municipality has a population of 140 inhabitants.

== Demographic ==
According to the 2004 census (INE), the municipality has a population of 216 inhabitants.

According to the 2025 census (INE), the municipality has a population of 140 inhabitants.
