= Lars van den Berg =

Dutch cyclist

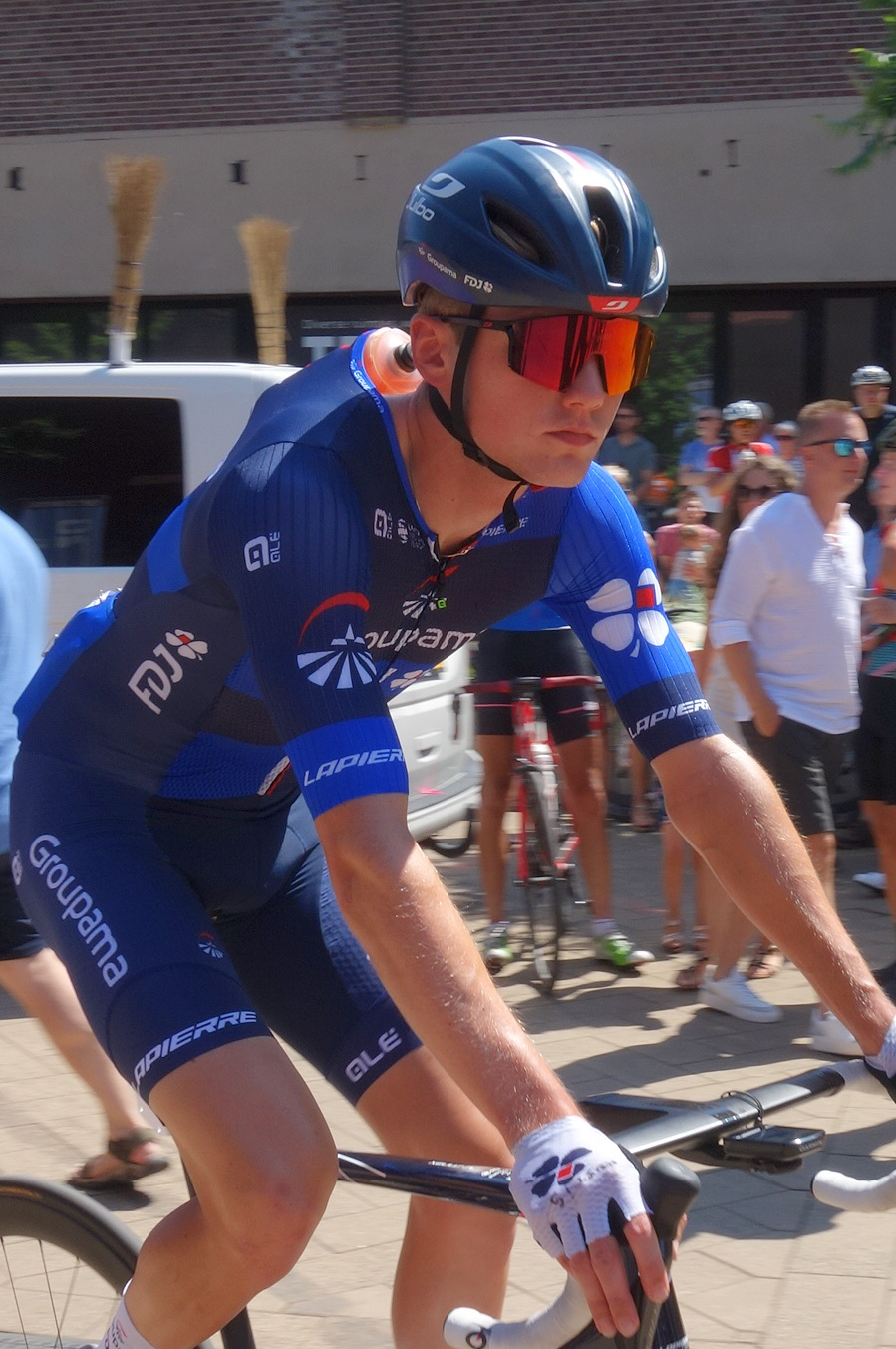
- van den Berg in 2023

Personal information
- Born: 7 July 1998 (age 28) De Meern, Netherlands
- Height: 1.85 m (6 ft 1 in)
- Weight: 72 kg (159 lb)

Cycling career
- Sport: Cycling
- Discipline: Road
- Role: Rider

Professional teams
- 2017–2019: Metec–TKH
- 2020: Équipe Continentale Groupama–FDJ
- 2020: Groupama–FDJ (development) (Note: Riding for Groupama–FDJ, van den Berg competed at the Tour de Wallonie, following the introduction of a UCI rule allowing riders registered with a development team to participate in UCI ProSeries or Class 1 events.)
- 2021–2025: Groupama–FDJ

Lars van den Berg (born 7 July 1998 in De Meern) is a retired Dutch cyclist, who previously rode for UCI WorldTeam Groupama–FDJ United. His brother Marijn van den Berg is also a cyclist. He was forced to retire at the age of 26, due to health issues.

== Major results ==
2015
3rd Road race, National Junior Road Championships
2016
6th Trofeo Buffoni
7th Grand Prix Bati-Metallo
2017
1st Young rider classification, Ronde de l'Oise
6th Overall Carpathian Couriers Race
10th Overall Bałtyk–Karkonosze Tour
2018
10th Paris–Tours Espoirs
2019
1st Young rider classification, Flèche du Sud
3rd Overall Olympia's Tour
10th Overall Tour de l'Avenir
10th Overall Kreiz Breizh Elites
10th Overall Rhône-Alpes Isère Tour
2020
8th Ster van Zwolle
2021
4th Paris–Camembert

=== Grand Tour general classification results timeline ===
Grand Tour	2021	2022	2023
Giro d'Italia	64	—	DNF
Tour de France	—	—	70
Vuelta a España	—	—	—

Legend
—	Did not compete
DNF	Did not finish
