= 2011 Tour de Langkawi =

2010–11 UCI Asia Tour, race 9 of 34

Race details
- Dates: 23 January–1 February 2011
- Stages: 10
- Distance: 1,315.4 km (817.4 mi)
- Winning time: 30h 08' 57"

Results
| Jersey awarded to the overall winner | Winner | Jonathan Monsalve (VEN) | (Androni Giocattoli) |
| | Second | Libardo Niño (COL) | (LeTua Cycling Team) |
| | Third | Emanuele Sella (ITA) | (Androni Giocattoli) |
| Jersey awarded to the points classification winner | Points | Andrea Guardini (ITA) | (Farnese Vini–Neri Sottoli) |
| Jersey awarded to the mountains classification winner | Mountains | Jonathan Monsalve (VEN) | (Androni Giocattoli) |
| | Team | Tabriz Petrochemical Team | |

The 2011 Tour de Langkawi was the 16th edition of the Tour de Langkawi, a cycling stage race that took place in Malaysia. It began on 23 January in Dataran Lang, Langkawi and ended on 1 February in Dataran Merdeka, Kuala Lumpur. The race was sanctioned by the Union Cycliste Internationale (UCI) as a 2.HC (hors category) race on the 2010–11 UCI Asia Tour calendar.

Venezuela's Jonathan Monsalve won the race followed by Colombian cyclist, Libardo Niño second and Italian cyclist Emanuele Sella third. Italian cyclist, Andrea Guardini won the points classification and Jonathan Monsalve became the King of the Mountains of the race. Tabriz Petrochemical Team led the teams classification of the race.

== Teams ==
23 teams accepted invitations to participate in the 2011 Tour de Langkawi.

- Farnese Vini–Neri Sottoli
- Androni Giocattoli
- Colnago–CSF Inox
- Team Europcar
- Suren Cycling Team
- UnitedHealthcare
- Skil–Shimano
- CCC–Polsat–Polkowice
- Landbouwkrediet
- South Korea ‡
- Malaysia ‡
- Tabriz Petrochemical Team
- Drapac Professional Cycling
- Singapore ‡
- Terengganu Cycling Team
- Giant Kenda Cycling Team
- Champion System
- Aisan Racing Team
- Azad University Iran
- LeTua Cycling Team
- Chipotle–Garmin Development Team
- MTN–Qhubeka
- Max Success Sports

‡: National teams

== Stages ==
The cyclists competed in 10 stages, covering a distance of 1,315.4 kilometres.

| Stage | Date | Course | Distance | Stage result | | |
| Stage | Date | Course | Distance | Winner | Second | Third |
|---|---|---|---|---|---|---|
| 1 | 23 January | Dataran Lang to Pekan Kuah | 94.3 km (58.6 mi) | Andrea Guardini (ITA); Farnese Vini–Neri Sottoli | Park Sung-Baek (KOR); South Korea | Harrif Salleh (MAS); Terengganu Cycling Team |
| 2 | 24 January | Kangar to Butterworth | 145.0 km (90.1 mi) | Andrea Guardini (ITA); Farnese Vini–Neri Sottoli | Boris Shpilevsky (RUS); Tabriz Petrochemical Team | Anuar Manan (MAS); Terengganu Cycling Team |
| 3 | 25 January | Taiping to Sitiawan | 144.9 km (90.0 mi) | Marcel Kittel (GER); Skil–Shimano | Anuar Manan (MAS); Terengganu Cycling Team | Andrea Guardini (ITA); Farnese Vini–Neri Sottoli |
| 4 | 26 January | Ayer Tawar to Cameron Highlands | 137.6 km (85.5 mi) | Takeaki Ayabe (JPN); Aisan Racing Team | Libardo Niño (COL); LeTua Cycling Team | Amir Zargari (IRI); Azad University Iran |
| 5 | 27 January | Tapah to Genting Highlands | 124.3 km (77.2 mi) | Jonathan Monsalve (VEN); Androni Giocattoli | Libardo Niño (COL); LeTua Cycling Team | Samad Pourseyedi (IRI); Azad University Iran |
| 6 | 28 January | Rawang to Putrajaya | 107.0 km (66.5 mi) | Andrea Guardini (ITA); Farnese Vini–Neri Sottoli | Anuar Manan (MAS); Terengganu Cycling Team | Takashi Miyazawa (Japan); Farnese Vini–Neri Sottoli |
| 7 | 29 January | Banting to Tampin | 149.5 km (92.9 mi) | Andrea Guardini (ITA); Farnese Vini–Neri Sottoli | Robert Förster (GER); UnitedHealthcare | Dene Rogers (NZL); Giant Kenda Cycling Team |
| 8 | 30 January | Kuala Pilah to Jasin | 156.5 km (97.2 mi) | Robert Förster (GER); UnitedHealthcare | André Schulze (GER); CCC–Polsat–Polkowice | Dene Rogers (NZL); Giant Kenda Cycling Team |
| 9 | 31 January | Malacca to Nilai | 151.7 km (94.3 mi) | Boris Shpilevsky (RUS); Tabriz Petrochemical Team | Perrig Quémeneur (FRA); Team Europcar | Robert Förster (GER); UnitedHealthcare |
| 10 | 1 February | Shah Alam to Merdeka Square, Kuala Lumpur | 104.6 km (65.0 mi) | Andrea Guardini (ITA); Farnese Vini–Neri Sottoli | Robert Förster (GER); UnitedHealthcare | Anuar Manan (MAS); Terengganu Cycling Team |

== Classification leadership ==
| Stage | Winner | General classification | Points classification | Mountains classification | Asian rider classification | Team classification | Asian team classification |
|---|---|---|---|---|---|---|---|
| 1 | Andrea Guardini | Andrea Guardini | Andrea Guardini | Koen de Kort | Park Sung-Baek | Terengganu Cycling Team | Terengganu Cycling Team |
| 2 | Andrea Guardini | Andrea Guardini | Andrea Guardini | Koen de Kort | Anuar Manan | Terengganu Cycling Team | Terengganu Cycling Team |
| 3 | Marcel Kittel | Andrea Guardini | Andrea Guardini | Mehdi Sohrabi | Anuar Manan | Terengganu Cycling Team | Terengganu Cycling Team |
| 4 | Takeaki Ayabe | Takeaki Ayabe | Andrea Guardini | Rahim Emami | Takeaki Ayabe | Chipotle–Garmin Development Team | Tabriz Petrochemical Team |
| 5 | Jonathan Monsalve | Libardo Niño | Andrea Guardini | Jonathan Monsalve | Rahim Emami | Azad University Iran | Azad University Iran |
| 6 | Andrea Guardini | Libardo Niño | Anuar Manan | Jonathan Monsalve | Rahim Emami | Azad University Iran | Azad University Iran |
| 7 | Andrea Guardini | Libardo Niño | Andrea Guardini | Jonathan Monsalve | Rahim Emami | Azad University Iran | Azad University Iran |
| 8 | Robert Förster | Jonathan Monsalve | Andrea Guardini | Jonathan Monsalve | Rahim Emami | Azad University Iran | Azad University Iran |
| 9 | Boris Shpilevsky | Jonathan Monsalve | Andrea Guardini | Jonathan Monsalve | Rahim Emami | Tabriz Petrochemical Team | Tabriz Petrochemical Team |
| 10 | Andrea Guardini | Jonathan Monsalve | Andrea Guardini | Jonathan Monsalve | Rahim Emami | Tabriz Petrochemical Team | Tabriz Petrochemical Team |
| Final | | Jonathan Monsalve | Andrea Guardini | Jonathan Monsalve | Rahim Emami | Tabriz Petrochemical Team | Tabriz Petrochemical Team |

== Final standings ==
=== General classification ===
| | Rider | Team | Time |
|---|---|---|---|
| 1 | Jonathan Monsalve (VEN) | Androni Giocattoli | 30h 08' 57" |
| 2 | Libardo Niño (COL) | LeTua Cycling Team | + 5" |
| 3 | Emanuele Sella (ITA) | Androni Giocattoli | + 24" |
| 4 | Dennis Van Niekerk (RSA) | MTN–Qhubeka | + 25" |
| 5 | Rahim Emami (IRI) | Azad University Iran | + 25" |
| 6 | Lachlan Morton (AUS) | Chipotle–Garmin Development Team | + 32" |
| 7 | Domenico Pozzovivo (ITA) | Colnago–CSF Inox | + 49" |
| 8 | Hossein Askari (IRI) | Tabriz Petrochemical Team | + 56" |
| 9 | Gong Hyo-Suk (KOR) | South Korea | + 57" |
| 10 | Ghader Mizbani (IRI) | Tabriz Petrochemical Team | + 1' 15" |

=== Points classification ===
| | Rider | Team | Points |
|---|---|---|---|
| 1 | Andrea Guardini (ITA) | Farnese Vini–Neri Sottoli | 117 |
| 2 | Anuar Manan (MAS) | Terengganu Cycling Team | 101 |
| 3 | Boris Shpilevsky (RUS) | Tabriz Petrochemical Team | 97 |

=== Mountains classification ===
| | Rider | Team | Points |
|---|---|---|---|
| 1 | Jonathan Monsalve (VEN) | Androni Giocattoli | 45 |
| 2 | Rahim Emami (IRI) | Azad University Iran | 35 |
| 3 | Albert Timmer (NED) | Skil–Shimano | 31 |

=== Asian rider classification ===
| | Rider | Team | Time |
|---|---|---|---|
| 1 | Rahim Emami (IRI) | Azad University Iran | 30h 09' 22" |
| 2 | Hossein Askari (IRI) | Tabriz Petrochemical Team | + 31" |
| 3 | Gong Hyo-Suk (KOR) | South Korea | + 32" |

=== Team classification ===
| | Team | Time |
|---|---|---|
| 1 | Tabriz Petrochemical Team | 90h 30' 59" |
| 2 | Azad University Iran | + 11" |
| 3 | Chipotle–Garmin Development Team | + 37" |
| 4 | Androni Giocattoli | + 6' 17" |
| 5 | Max Success Sports | + 10' 17" |
| 6 | South Korea | + 18' 14" |
| 7 | Team Europcar | + 20' 44" |
| 8 | Terengganu Cycling Team | + 21' 37" |
| 9 | Skil–Shimano | + 24' 48" |
| 10 | Giant Kenda Cycling Team | + 25' 25" |

=== Asian team classification ===
| | Team | Time |
|---|---|---|
| 1 | Azad University Iran | 90h 31' 10" |
| 2 | Max Success Sports | + 10' 06" |
| 3 | Tabriz Petrochemical Team | + 15' 56" |
| 4 | South Korea | + 18' 03" |
| 5 | Terengganu Cycling Team | + 21' 26" |
| 6 | Suren Cycling Team | + 34' 46" |
| 7 | Aisan Racing Team | + 47' 35" |
| 8 | Malaysia | + 1h 12' 30" |
| 9 | Singapore | + 1h 17' 50" |
| 10 | LeTua Cycling Team | + 1h 48' 29" |

== Stage results ==
=== Stage 1 ===
23 January 2011 — Dataran Lang to Pekan Kuah, 20.3 km (12.6 mi),

| | Rider | Team | Time |
|---|---|---|---|
| 1 | Andrea Guardini (ITA) | Farnese Vini–Neri Sottoli | 02h 03' 28" |
| 2 | Park Sung-Baek (KOR) | South Korea | s.t. |
| 3 | Harrif Salleh (MAS) | Terengganu Cycling Team | s.t. |
| 4 | Luca Barla (ITA) | Androni Giocattoli | s.t. |
| 5 | Kenny van Hummel (NED) | Skil–Shimano | s.t. |
| 6 | André Schulze (GER) | CCC–Polsat–Polkowice | s.t. |
| 7 | Hilton Clarke (AUS) | UnitedHealthcare | s.t. |
| 8 | Arran Brown (RSA) | MTN–Qhubeka | s.t. |
| 9 | Davy Commeyne (BEL) | Landbouwkrediet | s.t. |
| 10 | Joeri Stallaert (BEL) | Landbouwkrediet | s.t. |

=== Stage 2 ===
24 January 2011 — Kangar to Butterworth, 145.0 km (90.1 mi)

| | Rider | Team | Time |
|---|---|---|---|
| 1 | Andrea Guardini (ITA) | Farnese Vini–Selle Italia | 03h 26' 26" |
| 2 | Boris Shpilevsky (RUS) | Tabriz Petrochemical Team | s.t. |
| 3 | Anuar Manan (MAS) | Terengganu Cycling Team | s.t. |
| 4 | Vidal Celis Zabala (ESP) | LeTua Cycling Team | s.t. |
| 5 | Marcel Kittel (GER) | Skil–Shimano | s.t. |
| 6 | Davy Commeyne (BEL) | Landbouwkrediet | s.t. |
| 7 | Christoff Van Heerden (RSA) | MTN–Qhubeka | s.t. |
| 8 | Kenny Van Hummel (NED) | Skil–Shimano | s.t. |
| 9 | Raymond Kreder (NED) | Chipotle–Garmin Development Team | s.t. |
| 10 | Hilton Clarke (AUS) | UnitedHealthcare | s.t. |

=== Stage 3 ===
25 January 2011 — Taiping to Sitiawan, 144.9 km (90.0 mi)

| | Rider | Team | Time |
|---|---|---|---|
| 1 | Marcel Kittel (GER) | Skil–Shimano | 03h 14' 18" |
| 2 | Anuar Manan (MAS) | Terengganu Cycling Team | s.t. |
| 3 | Andrea Guardini (ITA) | Farnese Vini–Neri Sottoli | s.t. |
| 4 | André Schulze (GER) | CCC–Polsat–Polkowice | s.t. |
| 5 | Boris Shpilevsky (RUS) | Tabriz Petrochemical Team | s.t. |
| 6 | Chan Jae Jang (KOR) | South Korea | s.t. |
| 7 | Christoff Van Heerden (RSA) | MTN–Qhubeka | s.t. |
| 8 | Takeaki Ayabe (JPN) | Aisan Racing Team | s.t. |
| 9 | Elia Favilli (ITA) | Farnese Vini–Neri Sottoli | s.t. |
| 10 | Luca Barla (ITA) | Androni Giocattoli | s.t. |

=== Stage 4 ===
26 January 2011 — Ayer Tawar to Cameron Highlands, 137.6 km (85.5 mi)

| | Rider | Team | Time |
|---|---|---|---|
| 1 | Takeaki Ayabe (JPN) | Aisan Racing Team | 03h 42' 15" |
| 2 | Libardo Niño (COL) | LeTua Cycling Team | s.t. |
| 3 | Amir Zargari (IRI) | Azad University Iran | s.t. |
| 4 | Thomas Bonnin (FRA) | Skil–Shimano | s.t. |
| 5 | Christopher Jones (USA) | UnitedHealthcare | s.t. |
| 6 | Jonathan Monsalve (VEN) | Androni Giocattoli | s.t. |
| 7 | Alex Howes (USA) | Chipotle–Garmin Development Team | s.t. |
| 8 | Hossein Askari (IRI) | Tabriz Petrochemical Team | s.t. |
| 9 | Emanuele Sella (ITA) | Androni Giocattoli | + 2" |
| 10 | Jacob Rathe (USA) | Chipotle–Garmin Development Team | + 5" |

=== Stage 5 ===
27 January 2011 — Tapah to Genting Highlands, 124.3 km (77.2 mi)

| | Rider | Team | Time |
|---|---|---|---|
| 1 | Jonathan Monsalve (VEN) | Androni Giocattoli | 03h 33' 31" |
| 2 | Libardo Niño (COL) | LeTua Cycling Team | s.t. |
| 3 | Samad Pourseyedi (IRI) | Azad University Iran | + 2" |
| 4 | Dennis Van Niekerk (RSA) | MTN–Qhubeka | + 3" |
| 5 | Rahim Emami (IRI) | Azad University Iran | + 3" |
| 6 | Emanuele Sella (ITA) | Androni Giocattoli | + 5" |
| 7 | Lachlan Morton (AUS) | Chipotle–Garmin Development Team | + 8" |
| 8 | Domenico Pozzovivo (ITA) | Colnago–CSF Inox | + 17" |
| 9 | Ghader Mizbani (IRI) | Tabriz Petrochemical Team | + 31" |
| 10 | Gong Hyo-Suk (KOR) | South Korea | + 33" |

=== Stage 6 ===
28 January 2011 — Rawang to Putrajaya, 107.0 km (66.5 mi)

| | Rider | Team | Time |
|---|---|---|---|
| 1 | Andrea Guardini (ITA) | Farnese Vini–Neri Sottoli | 02h 14' 59" |
| 2 | Anuar Manan (MAS) | Terengganu Cycling Team | s.t. |
| 3 | Takashi Miyazawa (JPN) | Farnese Vini–Neri Sottoli | s.t. |
| 4 | Harrif Salleh (MAS) | Terengganu Cycling Team | s.t. |
| 5 | Jang Chan-Jae (KOR) | South Korea | s.t. |
| 6 | André Schulze (GER) | CCC–Polsat–Polkowice | s.t. |
| 7 | Robert Förster (GER) | UnitedHealthcare | s.t. |
| 8 | Taiji Nishitani (JPN) | Aisan Racing Team | s.t. |
| 9 | Alireza Haghi (IRI) | Azad University Iran | s.t. |
| 10 | Mohd Nur Rizuan Zainal (MAS) | Malaysia | s.t. |

=== Stage 7 ===
29 January 2011 — Banting to Tampin, 149.5 km (92.9 mi)

| | Rider | Team | Time |
|---|---|---|---|
| 1 | Andrea Guardini (ITA) | Farnese Vini–Neri Sottoli | 03h 24' 57" |
| 2 | Robert Förster (GER) | UnitedHealthcare | s.t. |
| 3 | Dene Rogers (NZL) | Giant Kenda Cycling Team | s.t. |
| 4 | Boris Shpilevsky (RUS) | Tabriz Petrochemical Team | s.t. |
| 5 | Marcel Kittel (GER) | Skil–Shimano | s.t. |
| 6 | Takashi Miyazawa (JPN) | Farnese Vini–Neri Sottoli | s.t. |
| 7 | André Schulze (GER) | CCC–Polsat–Polkowice | s.t. |
| 8 | Elia Favilli (ITA) | Farnese Vini–Neri Sottoli | s.t. |
| 9 | Joeri Stallaert (BEL) | Landbouwkrediet | s.t. |
| 10 | Jang Chan-Jae (KOR) | South Korea | s.t. |

=== Stage 8 ===
30 January 2011 — Kuala Pilah to Jasin, 156.5 km (97.2 mi)

| | Rider | Team | Time |
|---|---|---|---|
| 1 | Robert Förster (GER) | UnitedHealthcare | 3h 23' 32" |
| 2 | André Schulze (GER) | CCC–Polsat–Polkowice | s.t. |
| 3 | Dene Rogers (NZL) | Giant Kenda Cycling Team | s.t. |
| 4 | Andrea Guardini (ITA) | Farnese Vini–Neri Sottoli | 03h 24' 57" |
| 5 | Boris Shpilevsky (RUS) | Tabriz Petrochemical Team | s.t. |
| 6 | Kenny Van Hummel (NED) | Skil–Shimano | s.t. |
| 7 | Jang Chan-Jae (KOR) | South Korea | s.t. |
| 8 | Joeri Stallaert (BEL) | Landbouwkrediet | s.t. |
| 9 | Elia Favilli (ITA) | Farnese Vini–Neri Sottoli | s.t. |
| 10 | Harrif Salleh (MAS) | Terengganu Cycling Team | s.t. |

=== Stage 9 ===
31 January 2011 — Malacca to Nilai, 151.7 km (94.3 mi)

| | Rider | Team | Time |
|---|---|---|---|
| 1 | Boris Shpilevsky (RUS) | Tabriz Petrochemical Team | 2h 40' 52" |
| 2 | Perrig Quéméneur (FRA) | Team Europcar | + 2" |
| 3 | Robert Förster (GER) | UnitedHealthcare | + 5" |
| 4 | Baptiste Planckaert (BEL) | Landbouwkrediet | + 5" |
| 5 | Omar Lombardi (ITA) | Colnago–CSF Inox | + 5" |
| 6 | Takashi Miyazawa (JPN) | Farnese Vini–Neri Sottoli | + 5" |
| 7 | Koen de Kort (NED) | Skil–Shimano | + 5" |
| 8 | Jose Mendes (POR) | CCC–Polsat–Polkowice | + 7" |
| 9 | Andrei Krasilnikau (BLR) | Chipotle–Garmin Development Team | + 9" |
| 10 | Farshad Salehian (IRI) | Azad University Iran | + 15" |

=== Stage 10 ===
1 February 2011 — Shah Alam to Dataran Merdeka, 104.6 km (65.0 mi)

| | Rider | Team | Time |
|---|---|---|---|
| 1 | Andrea Guardini (ITA) | Farnese Vini–Neri Sottoli | 2h 24' 30" |
| 2 | Robert Förster (GER) | UnitedHealthcare | s.t. |
| 3 | Anuar Manan (MAS) | Terengganu Cycling Team | s.t. |
| 4 | Christoff Van Heerden (RSA) | MTN–Qhubeka | s.t. |
| 5 | Kenny Van Hummel (NED) | Skil–Shimano | s.t. |
| 6 | Boris Shpilevsky (RUS) | Tabriz Petrochemical Team | s.t. |
| 7 | Joeri Stallaert (BEL) | Landbouwkrediet | s.t. |
| 8 | André Schulze (GER) | CCC–Polsat–Polkowice | s.t. |
| 9 | Takeaki Ayabe (JPN) | Aisan Racing Team | s.t. |
| 10 | Omar Lombardi (ITA) | Colnago–CSF Inox | s.t. |
