= 2013–14 UCI Asia Tour =

- Tenth edition of the UCI Asia Tour

Details
- Dates: 6 October 2013–20 December 2014
- Location: Asia
- Races: 41

The 2013–14 UCI Asia Tour was the 10th season of the UCI Asia Tour. The season began on 6 October 2013 with the Tour of Almaty and ended on 20 December 2014 with the Tour of Al Zubarah.

The points leader, based on the cumulative results of previous races, wears the UCI Asia Tour cycling jersey. Julián Arredondo from Colombia is the defending champion of the 2012–13 UCI Asia Tour.

Throughout the season, points are awarded to the top finishers of stages within stage races and the final general classification standings of each of the stages races and one-day events. The quality and complexity of a race also determine how many points are awarded to the top finishers, the higher the UCI rating of a race, the more points are awarded.

The UCI ratings from highest to lowest are as follows:

- Multi-day events: 2.HC, 2.1 and 2.2
- One-day events: 1.HC, 1.1 and 1.2

== Events ==
=== 2013 ===
Date	Race Name	Location	UCI Rating	Winner	Team
6 October	Tour of Almaty	Kazakhstan	1.2	Maxim Iglinsky (KAZ)	Kazakhstan (national team)
20 October	Japan Cup	Japan	1.HC	Jack Bauer (NZL)	Garmin–Sharp
20–28 October	Tour of Hainan	China	2.HC	Moreno Hofland (NED)	Belkin Pro Cycling
2–5 November	Tour de Ijen	Indonesia	2.2	Samad Pourseyedi (IRI)	Tabriz Petrochemical Team
2–10 November	Tour of Taihu Lake	China	2.1	Yuriy Metlushenko (UKR)	Torku Şekerspor
10 November	Tour de Okinawa	Japan	1.2	Sho Hatsuyama (JPN)	Bridgestone–Anchor
12 November	Tour of Nanjing	China	1.2	Alois Kaňkovský (CZE)	ASC Dukla Praha
16–18 November	Tour of Fuzhou	China	2.2	Rahim Ememi (IRI)	RTS–Santic Racing Team
22–25 November	Sharjah Cycling Tour	United Arab Emirates	2.2	Roman Van Uden (NZL)	Frankies-GAC-Wolfis
4–7 December	Tour of Al Zubarah	Qatar	2.2	Yousif Banihammad (UAE)	United Arab Emirates (national team)
15 December	CFI International Race I	India	1.2	Nur Amiraul Fakhruddin Mazuki (MAS)	Terengganu Cycling Team
17 December	CFI International Race II	India	1.2	Mohamed Saiful Anuar Aziz (MAS)	Terengganu Cycling Team
22 December	CFI International Race III	India	1.2	Mohamed Nor Umardi Rosdi (MAS)	Terengganu Cycling Team

=== 2014 ===
Date	Race Name	Location	UCI Rating	Winner	Team
5–8 February	Dubai Tour	United Arab Emirates	2.1	Taylor Phinney (USA)	BMC Racing Team
9–14 February	Tour of Qatar	Qatar	2.HC	Niki Terpstra (NED)	Omega Pharma–Quick-Step
18–23 February	Tour of Oman	Oman	2.HC	Chris Froome (GBR)	Team Sky
27 February–8 March	Tour de Langkawi	Malaysia	2.HC	Samad Pourseyedi (IRI)	Tabriz Petrochemical Team
9–13 March	Tour de Taiwan	Taiwan	2.1	Rémy Di Gregorio (FRA)	Team La Pomme Marseille 13
1–6 April	Tour of Thailand	Thailand	2.2	Yasuharu Nakajima (JPN)	Aisan Racing Team
21–24 April	Le Tour de Filipinas	Philippines	2.2	Mark Galedo (PHI)	Team 7 Eleven Road Bike Philippines
27 April	Melaka Governor Cup	Malaysia	1.2	Alexandre Pliuschin (MDA)	Skydive Dubai Pro Cycling
18–25 May	Tour of Japan	Japan	2.1	Samad Pourseyedi (IRI)	Tabriz Petrochemical Team
29 May	Asian Cycling Championships – Time Trial	Kazakhstan	CC	Dmitriy Gruzdev (KAZ)	Kazakhstan (national team)
29 May–1 June	Tour de Kumano	Japan	2.2	Francisco Mancebo (ESP)	Skydive Dubai Pro Cycling
1 June	Asian Cycling Championships – Road Race	Kazakhstan	CC	Ruslan Tleubayev (KAZ)	Kazakhstan (national team)
7–15 June	Tour de Singkarak	Indonesia	2.2	Amir Zargari (IRI)	Pishgaman Yazd
8–15 June	Tour de Korea	South Korea	2.1	Hugh Carthy (GBR)	Rapha Condor–JLT
17–22 June	Tour of Iran (Azerbaijan)	Iran	2.1	Ghader Mizbani (IRI)	Tabriz Petrochemical Team
6–19 July	Tour of Qinghai Lake	China	2.HC	Ilya Davidenok (KAZ)	Continental Team Astana
30 August– 5 September	Tour of China I	China	2.1	Kamil Gradek (POL)	BDC-Marcpol
6–7 September	Tour de East Java	Indonesia	2.2	Ghader Mizbani (IRI)	Tabriz Petrochemical Team
8–14 September	Tour of China II	China	2.1	Boris Shpilevsky (RUS)	RTS–Santic Racing Team
13–15 September	Tour de Hokkaido	Japan	2.2	Joshua Prete (AUS)	Team Budget Forklifts
5 October	Tour of Almaty	Kazakhstan	1.1	Alexey Lutsenko (KAZ)	Astana
16–19 October	Banyuwangi Tour de Ijen	Indonesia	2.2	Peter Pouly (FRA)	Singha Infinite Cycling
19 October	Japan Cup	Japan	1.HC	Nathan Haas (AUS)	Garmin–Sharp
20–28 October	Tour of Hainan	China	2.HC	Julien Antomarchi (FRA)	Team La Pomme Marseille 13
1–9 November	Tour of Taihu Lake	China	2.1	Sam Witmitz (AUS)	Team Budget Forklifts
9 November	Tour de Okinawa	Japan	1.2	Nariyuki Masuda (JPN)	Utsunomiya Blitzen
11 November	Tour of Yancheng Coastal Wetlands	China	1.2	Jesse Kerrison (AUS)	Team Budget Forklifts
14–16 November	Tour of Fuzhou	China	2.2	Samad Pourseyedi (IRI)	Tabriz Petrochemical Team
18–23 November	Sharjah Cycling Tour	United Arab Emirates	2.2	Alexandre Pliuschin (MDA)	Skydive Dubai Pro Cycling
13–17 December	Jelajah Malaysia	Malaysia	2.2	Rafaâ Chtioui (TUN)	Skydive Dubai Pro Cycling
17–20 December	Tour of Al Zubarah	Qatar	2.2	Azzedine Lagab (ALG)	Groupement Sportif Pétrolier Algérie
