= 2025 Tour de Langkawi =

Malaysian cycling race

2025 UCI ProSeries

Race details
- Dates: 28 September - 5 October 2025
- Stages: 8
- Distance: 1,244.7 km (773.4 mi)
- Winning time: 23h 27' 18"

Results
| Jersey awarded to the overall winner | Winner | Joris Delbove (FRA) | (Team TotalEnergies) |
| | Second | Anders Halland Johannessen (NOR) | (Uno-X Mobility) |
| | Third | Yannis Voisard (SUI) | (Tudor Pro Cycling Team) |
| Jersey awarded to the points classification winner | Points | Erlend Blikra (NOR) | (Uno-X Mobility) |
| Jersey awarded to the mountains classification winner | Mountains | Patrick Eddy (AUS) | (Team Picnic–PostNL) |
| | Team | (Italy) Team Polti VisitMalta | |

The 2025 Tour de Langkawi (officially Petronas Le Tour de Langkawi 2025 for sponsorship reasons) was the 29th edition of the Tour de Langkawi road cycling stage race. It is part of the 2025 UCI ProSeries. The race began on the 28th of September in Langkawi and finished on the 5th of October in Kuala Lumpur.

== Teams ==
Two UCI WorldTeams, nine UCI ProTeams, ten UCI Continental teams and one national team make up the twenty-two teams that participated in the race. The teams were announced by the organizers, the Malaysian National Sports Council (NSC) on 7 August 2025. Originally WorldTeam Cofidis were also invited and their participation announced on 7 August, but the team later withdrawn on 25 August, and they were replaced by the organizers with the ProTeam Equipo Kern Pharma.

Each team entered six riders, except for Team Picnic–PostNL, KSPO Professional, and Chengdu DYC Cycling Team, which each entered five. Of the 129 riders who started the race, 98 finished.

UCI WorldTeams

- Team Picnic–PostNL
- XDS Astana Team

UCI ProTeams

- Burgos Burpellet BH
- Equipo Kern Pharma
- Team Polti VisitMalta
- Team Solution Tech–Vini Fantini
- Team TotalEnergies
- Tudor Pro Cycling Team
- Unibet Tietema Rockets
- Uno-X Mobility
- VF Group–Bardiani–CSF–Faizanè

UCI Continental Teams

- 7 Eleven–Cliqq Roadbike Philippines
- Aisan Racing Team
- Chengdu DYC Cycling Team
- HKSI Pro Cycling Team
- KSPO Professional
- Malaysia Pro Cycling
- Nusantara–BYC Cycling Team
- St George Continental Cycling Team
- Terengganu Cycling Team
- Thailand Continental Cycling Team

National Teams

- Malaysia

== Pre-race favourites ==
At the team announcement, Alexander Kristoff (Uno-X Mobility), Fabio Jakobsen (Team Picnic–PostNL) and Alberto Dainese (Tudor Pro Cycling Team) were placed in the preliminary start list by their respective teams. However, Jakobsen and Dainese pulled out two days before the race due to injuries. Kristoff has announced in the pre-race media conference that this race would be the last race of his professional career before retiring at the end of the season, and targeting 2 more wins in the race to complete his 100 professional wins.

The previous year's winner, Max Poole did not participate in this edition to defend his title.In the absence of Poole, Fredrik Dversnes (Uno-X Mobility) and Aaron Gate (XDS Astana Team) were seen by the organizers as the favourites to the general classification (GC) title.

== Route ==
The routes were announced on 6 March 2025. There were a proposal by Kedah State Legislative Assembly member Muhamad Radhi Mat Din to hold the final stage at Langkawi so that the teams and fans will stay longer in the island after the event ends, but in the end Langkawi will hold the opening stage as last year's event.

Stage characteristics and winners
| Stage | Date | Course | Distance | Type | Stage winner |
|---|---|---|---|---|---|
| 1 | 28 September | Langkawi Round Island (Kuah to Kuah) | 96.7 km (60.1 mi) | Flat stage | Matteo Malucelli (ITA) |
| 2 | 29 September | Padang Besar to Kepala Batas | 167.3 km (104.0 mi) | Flat stage | Arvid De Kleijn (NED) |
| 3 | 30 September | Gerik to Pasir Puteh | 198.2 km (123.2 mi) | Hilly stage | Matteo Malucelli (ITA) |
| 4 | 1 October | Kuala Terengganu to Kemaman | 140.8 km (87.5 mi) | Flat stage | Matteo Malucelli (ITA) |
| 5 | 2 October | Temerloh to Fraser's Hill | 123.1 km (76.5 mi) | Mountain stage | Joris Delbove (FRA) |
| 6 | 3 October | Shah Alam to Port Dickson | 123.5 km (76.7 mi) | Flat stage | Arvid De Kleijn (NED) |
| 7 | 4 October | Melaka to Medini | 214.9 km (133.5 mi) | Flat stage | Zeb Kyffin (GBR) |
| 8 | 5 October | Tangkak to Kuala Lumpur | 180.2 km (112.0 mi) | Hilly stage | Aaron Gate (NZL) |
| Total | | | 1,244.7 km (773.4 mi) | | |

== Stages ==
=== Stage 1 ===
28 September 2025 — Langkawi Round Island (Kuah to Kuah), 96.7 km (60.1 mi)

Stage 1 Result
| Rank | Rider | Team | Time |
|---|---|---|---|
| 1 | Matteo Malucelli (ITA) | XDS Astana Team | 2h 00' 22" |
| 2 | Erlend Blikra (NOR) | Uno-X Mobility | + 0" |
| 3 | Arvid De Kleijn (NED) | Tudor Pro Cycling Team | + 0" |
| 4 | Manuel Peñalver (ESP) | Team Polti VisitMalta | + 0" |
| 5 | Alexander Kristoff (NOR) | Uno-X Mobility | + 0" |
| 6 | Dušan Rajović (SRB) | Team Solution Tech–Vini Fantini | + 0" |
| 7 | Jason Tesson (FRA) | Team TotalEnergies | + 0" |
| 8 | Marc Brustenga (ESP) | Equipo Kern Pharma | + 0" |
| 9 | Mohd Harrif Saleh (MAS) | Terengganu Cycling Team | + 0" |
| 10 | Patrick Eddy (AUS) | Team Picnic–PostNL | + 0" |

General classification after Stage 1
| Rank | Rider | Team | Time |
|---|---|---|---|
| 1 | Matteo Malucelli (ITA) | XDS Astana Team | 2h 00' 12" |
| 2 | Nur Aiman Rosli (MAS) | Terengganu Cycling Team | + 3" |
| 3 | Erlend Blikra (NOR) | Uno-X Mobility | + 4" |
| 4 | Adrien Maire (FRA) | Unibet Tietema Rockets | + 4" |
| 5 | Arvid De Kleijn (NED) | Tudor Pro Cycling Team | + 6" |
| 6 | Nate Hadden (AUS) | St George Continental Cycling Team | + 7" |
| 7 | George Matsui (JPN) | Aisan Racing Team | + 8" |
| 8 | Manuel Peñalver (ESP) | Team Polti VisitMalta | + 10" |
| 9 | Alexander Kristoff (NOR) | Uno-X Mobility | + 10" |
| 10 | Dušan Rajović (SRB) | Team Solution Tech–Vini Fantini | + 10" |

=== Stage 2 ===
29 September 2025 — Padang Besar to Kepala Batas, 167.3 km (104.0 mi)

Stage 2 Result
| Rank | Rider | Team | Time |
|---|---|---|---|
| 1 | Arvid De Kleijn (NED) | Tudor Pro Cycling Team | 3h 29' 59" |
| 2 | Matteo Malucelli (ITA) | XDS Astana Team | + 0" |
| 3 | Enrico Zanoncello (ITA) | VF Group–Bardiani–CSF–Faizanè | + 0" |
| 4 | Filippo Fortin (ITA) | Team Solution Tech–Vini Fantini | + 0" |
| 5 | Jason Tesson (FRA) | Team TotalEnergies | + 0" |
| 6 | Wan Abdul Rahman Hamdan (MAS) | Terengganu Cycling Team | + 0" |
| 7 | Mohamad Izzat Hilmi Abdul Halil (MAS) | Malaysia Pro Cycling | + 0" |
| 8 | Erlend Blikra (NOR) | Uno-X Mobility | + 0" |
| 9 | Manuel Peñalver (ESP) | Team Polti VisitMalta | + 0" |
| 10 | Miguel Ángel Fernández (ESP) | Equipo Kern Pharma | + 0" |

General classification after Stage 2
| Rank | Rider | Team | Time |
|---|---|---|---|
| 1 | Matteo Malucelli (ITA) | XDS Astana Team | 5h 30' 05" |
| 2 | Arvid De Kleijn (NED) | Tudor Pro Cycling Team | + 2" |
| 3 | Nur Aiman Rosli (MAS) | Terengganu Cycling Team | + 9" |
| 4 | Erlend Blikra (NOR) | Uno-X Mobility | + 10" |
| 5 | Adrien Maire (FRA) | Unibet Tietema Rockets | + 10" |
| 6 | Enrico Zanoncello (ITA) | VF Group–Bardiani–CSF–Faizanè | + 12" |
| 7 | Iván Cobo (ESP) | Equipo Kern Pharma | + 13" |
| 8 | Vadim Pronskiy (KAZ) | Terengganu Cycling Team | + 13" |
| 9 | Nate Hadden (AUS) | St George Continental Cycling Team | + 13" |
| 10 | Thanakhan Chaiyasombat (THA) | Thailand Continental Cycling Team | + 13" |

=== Stage 3 ===
30 September 2025 — Gerik to Pasir Puteh, 198.2 km (123.2 mi)

Stage 3 Result
| Rank | Rider | Team | Time |
|---|---|---|---|
| 1 | Matteo Malucelli (ITA) | XDS Astana Team | 4h 28' 04" |
| 2 | Alexander Kristoff (NOR) | Uno-X Mobility | + 0" |
| 3 | Erlend Blikra (NOR) | Uno-X Mobility | + 0" |
| 4 | Manuel Peñalver (ESP) | Team Polti VisitMalta | + 0" |
| 5 | Enrico Zanoncello (ITA) | VF Group–Bardiani–CSF–Faizanè | + 0" |
| 6 | Miguel Ángel Fernández (ESP) | Equipo Kern Pharma | + 0" |
| 7 | Lorrenzo Manzin (FRA) | Team TotalEnergies | + 0" |
| 8 | Marc Brustenga (ESP) | Equipo Kern Pharma | + 0" |
| 9 | Vojtěch Kmínek (CZE) | Burgos Burpellet BH | + 0" |
| 10 | Fabian Lienhard (SUI) | Tudor Pro Cycling Team | + 0" |

General classification after Stage 3
| Rank | Rider | Team | Time |
|---|---|---|---|
| 1 | Matteo Malucelli (ITA) | XDS Astana Team | 9h 57' 59" |
| 2 | Erlend Blikra (NOR) | Uno-X Mobility | + 16" |
| 3 | Aaron Gate (NZL) | XDS Astana Team | + 16" |
| 4 | Adrien Maire (FRA) | Unibet Tietema Rockets | + 18" |
| 5 | Alexander Kristoff (NOR) | Uno-X Mobility | + 20" |
| 6 | Iván Cobo (ESP) | Equipo Kern Pharma | + 21" |
| 7 | Enrico Zanoncello (ITA) | VF Group–Bardiani–CSF–Faizanè | + 22" |
| 8 | Vadim Pronskiy (KAZ) | Terengganu Cycling Team | + 23" |
| 9 | Thanakhan Chaiyasombat (THA) | Thailand Continental Cycling Team | + 23" |
| 10 | Cedrik Bakke Christophersen (NOR) | Unibet Tietema Rockets | + 23" |

=== Stage 4 ===
1 October 2025 — Kuala Terengganu to Kemaman, 140.8 km (87.5 mi)

Stage 4 Result
| Rank | Rider | Team | Time |
|---|---|---|---|
| 1 | Matteo Malucelli (ITA) | XDS Astana Team | 3h 17' 56" |
| 2 | Manuel Peñalver (ESP) | Team Polti VisitMalta | + 0" |
| 3 | Erlend Blikra (NOR) | Uno-X Mobility | + 0" |
| 4 | Enrico Zanoncello (ITA) | VF Group–Bardiani–CSF–Faizanè | + 0" |
| 5 | Marc Brustenga (ESP) | Equipo Kern Pharma | + 0" |
| 6 | Lorrenzo Manzin (FRA) | Team TotalEnergies | + 0" |
| 7 | Mohamad Izzat Hilmi Abdul Halil (MAS) | Malaysia Pro Cycling | + 0" |
| 8 | Arvid De Kleijn (NED) | Tudor Pro Cycling Team | + 0" |
| 9 | Aaron Gate (NZL) | XDS Astana Team | + 0" |
| 10 | Miguel Ángel Fernández (ESP) | Equipo Kern Pharma | + 0" |

General classification after Stage 4
| Rank | Rider | Team | Time |
|---|---|---|---|
| 1 | Matteo Malucelli (ITA) | XDS Astana Team | 13h 15' 45" |
| 2 | Erlend Blikra (NOR) | Uno-X Mobility | + 22" |
| 3 | Aaron Gate (NZL) | XDS Astana Team | + 26" |
| 4 | Adrien Maire (FRA) | Unibet Tietema Rockets | + 28" |
| 5 | Vojtěch Kmínek (CZE) | Burgos Burpellet BH | + 29" |
| 6 | Manuel Peñalver (ESP) | Team Polti VisitMalta | + 30" |
| 7 | Alexander Kristoff (NOR) | Uno-X Mobility | + 30" |
| 8 | Iván Cobo (ESP) | Equipo Kern Pharma | + 31" |
| 9 | Enrico Zanoncello (ITA) | VF Group–Bardiani–CSF–Faizanè | + 32" |
| 10 | Vadim Pronskiy (KAZ) | Terengganu Cycling Team | + 33" |

=== Stage 5 ===
2 October 2025 — Temerloh to Fraser's Hill, 123.1 km (76.5 mi)

Stage 5 Result
| Rank | Rider | Team | Time |
|---|---|---|---|
| 1 | Joris Delbove (FRA) | Team TotalEnergies | 3h 0' 25" |
| 2 | Anders Halland Johannessen (NOR) | Uno-X Mobility | + 2" |
| 3 | Yannis Voisard (SUI) | Tudor Pro Cycling Team | + 2" |
| 4 | Nicolas Vinokurov (KAZ) | XDS Astana Team | + 2" |
| 5 | Adrien Maire (FRA) | Unibet Tietema Rockets | + 2" |
| 6 | José Manuel Díaz (ESP) | Burgos Burpellet BH | + 2" |
| 7 | Odd Christian Eiking (NOR) | Unibet Tietema Rockets | + 2" |
| 8 | Davide Bais (ITA) | Team Polti VisitMalta | + 2" |
| 9 | Luca Covili (ITA) | VF Group–Bardiani–CSF–Faizanè | + 2" |
| 10 | Cedrik Bakke Christophersen (NOR) | Unibet Tietema Rockets | + 2" |

General classification after Stage 5
| Rank | Rider | Team | Time |
|---|---|---|---|
| 1 | Joris Delbove (FRA) | Team TotalEnergies | 16h 16' 34" |
| 2 | Anders Halland Johannessen (NOR) | Uno-X Mobility | + 6" |
| 3 | Adrien Maire (FRA) | Unibet Tietema Rockets | + 6" |
| 4 | Yannis Voisard (SUI) | Tudor Pro Cycling Team | + 10" |
| 5 | Cedrik Bakke Christophersen (NOR) | Unibet Tietema Rockets | + 11" |
| 6 | Fernando Tercero (ESP) | Team Polti VisitMalta | + 14" |
| 7 | Nicolas Vinokurov (KAZ) | XDS Astana Team | + 14" |
| 8 | Luca Covili (ITA) | VF Group–Bardiani–CSF–Faizanè | + 14" |
| 9 | Jorge Gutiérrez (ESP) | Equipo Kern Pharma | + 14" |
| 10 | Davide Bais (ITA) | Team Polti VisitMalta | + 14" |

=== Stage 6 ===
3 October 2025 — Shah Alam to Port Dickson, 123.5 km (76.7 mi)

Stage 6 Result
| Rank | Rider | Team | Time |
|---|---|---|---|
| 1 | Arvid De Kleijn (NED) | Tudor Pro Cycling Team | 2h 32' 55" |
| 2 | Erlend Blikra (NOR) | Uno-X Mobility | + 0" |
| 3 | Manuel Peñalver (ESP) | Team Polti VisitMalta | + 0" |
| 4 | Mohamad Izzat Hilmi Abdul Halil (MAS) | Malaysia Pro Cycling | + 0" |
| 5 | Alexander Kristoff (NOR) | Uno-X Mobility | + 0" |
| 6 | Filippo Fortin (ITA) | Team Solution Tech–Vini Fantini | + 0" |
| 7 | Aaron Gate (NZL) | XDS Astana Team | + 0" |
| 8 | Lorrenzo Manzin (FRA) | Team TotalEnergies | + 0" |
| 9 | Enrico Zanoncello (ITA) | VF Group–Bardiani–CSF–Faizanè | + 0" |
| 10 | Patrick Eddy (AUS) | Team Picnic–PostNL | + 0" |

General classification after Stage 6
| Rank | Rider | Team | Time |
|---|---|---|---|
| 1 | Joris Delbove (FRA) | Team TotalEnergies | 18h 49' 29" |
| 2 | Anders Halland Johannessen (NOR) | Uno-X Mobility | + 6" |
| 3 | Adrien Maire (FRA) | Unibet Tietema Rockets | + 6" |
| 4 | Yannis Voisard (SUI) | Tudor Pro Cycling Team | + 7" |
| 5 | Nicolas Vinokurov (KAZ) | XDS Astana Team | + 11" |
| 6 | Cedrik Bakke Christophersen (NOR) | Unibet Tietema Rockets | + 11" |
| 7 | Fernando Tercero (ESP) | Team Polti VisitMalta | + 14" |
| 8 | Luca Covili (ITA) | VF Group–Bardiani–CSF–Faizanè | + 14" |
| 9 | Davide Bais (ITA) | Team Polti VisitMalta | + 14" |
| 10 | José Manuel Díaz (ESP) | Burgos Burpellet BH | + 14" |

=== Stage 7 ===
4 October 2025 — Melaka to Medini, 214.9 km (133.5 mi)

Stage 7 Result
| Rank | Rider | Team | Time |
|---|---|---|---|
| 1 | Zeb Kyffin (GBR) | Unibet Tietema Rockets | 4h 37' 39" |
| 2 | Nur Aiman Rosli (MAS) | Terengganu Cycling Team | + 2" |
| 3 | Arvid De Kleijn (NED) | Tudor Pro Cycling Team | + 10" |
| 4 | Erlend Blikra (NOR) | Uno-X Mobility | + 10" |
| 5 | Manuel Peñalver (ESP) | Team Polti VisitMalta | + 10" |
| 6 | Marc Brustenga (ESP) | Equipo Kern Pharma | + 10" |
| 7 | Aaron Gate (NZL) | XDS Astana Team | + 10" |
| 8 | Lorrenzo Manzin (FRA) | Team TotalEnergies | + 10" |
| 9 | Mohamad Izzat Hilmi Abdul Halil (MAS) | Malaysia Pro Cycling | + 10" |
| 10 | Enrico Zanoncello (ITA) | VF Group–Bardiani–CSF–Faizanè | + 10" |

General classification after Stage 7
| Rank | Rider | Team | Time |
|---|---|---|---|
| 1 | Joris Delbove (FRA) | Team TotalEnergies | 23h 27' 18" |
| 2 | Yannis Voisard (SUI) | Tudor Pro Cycling Team | + 6" |
| 3 | Anders Halland Johannessen (NOR) | Uno-X Mobility | + 6" |
| 4 | Adrien Maire (FRA) | Unibet Tietema Rockets | + 6" |
| 5 | Nicolas Vinokurov (KAZ) | XDS Astana Team | + 11" |
| 6 | Cedrik Bakke Christophersen (NOR) | Unibet Tietema Rockets | + 11" |
| 7 | Fernando Tercero (ESP) | Team Polti VisitMalta | + 14" |
| 8 | Luca Covili (ITA) | VF Group–Bardiani–CSF–Faizanè | + 14" |
| 9 | José Manuel Díaz (ESP) | Burgos Burpellet BH | + 14" |
| 10 | Davide Bais (ITA) | Team Polti VisitMalta | + 14" |

=== Stage 8 ===
5 October 2025 — Tangkak to Kuala Lumpur, 180.2 km (112.0 mi)

Stage 8 Result
| Rank | Rider | Team | Time |
|---|---|---|---|
| 1 | Aaron Gate (NZL) | XDS Astana Team | 3h 50' 05" |
| 2 | Aivaras Mikutis (LTU) | Tudor Pro Cycling Team | + 0" |
| 3 | Nil Gimeno (ESP) | Equipo Kern Pharma | + 7" |
| 4 | Erlend Blikra (NOR) | Uno-X Mobility | + 15" |
| 5 | Enrico Zanoncello (ITA) | VF Group–Bardiani–CSF–Faizanè | + 15" |
| 6 | Anders Halland Johannessen (NOR) | Uno-X Mobility | + 15" |
| 7 | Fabian Lienhard (SUI) | Tudor Pro Cycling Team | + 15" |
| 8 | Davide Bais (ITA) | Team Polti VisitMalta | + 15" |
| 9 | José Manuel Díaz (ESP) | Burgos Burpellet BH | + 15" |
| 10 | Felix Meo (NZL) | Team Solution Tech–Vini Fantini | + 15" |

General classification after Stage 8
| Rank | Rider | Team | Time |
|---|---|---|---|
| 1 | Joris Delbove (FRA) | Team TotalEnergies | 27h 17' 38" |
| 2 | Anders Halland Johannessen (NOR) | Uno-X Mobility | + 3" |
| 3 | Yannis Voisard (SUI) | Tudor Pro Cycling Team | + 6" |
| 4 | Nicolas Vinokurov (KAZ) | XDS Astana Team | + 11" |
| 5 | Cedrik Bakke Christophersen (NOR) | Unibet Tietema Rockets | + 11" |
| 6 | Fernando Tercero (ESP) | Team Polti VisitMalta | + 14" |
| 7 | Luca Covili (ITA) | VF Group–Bardiani–CSF–Faizanè | + 14" |
| 8 | José Manuel Díaz (ESP) | Burgos Burpellet BH | + 14" |
| 9 | Davide Bais (ITA) | Team Polti VisitMalta | + 14" |
| 10 | Jorge Gutiérrez (ESP) | Equipo Kern Pharma | + 14" |

== Classification leadership table ==
In Tour de Langkawi, four different jerseys were awarded. The general classification was calculated by adding each cyclist's finishing times on each stage, and applying time bonuses for the first three riders at intermediate sprints (three seconds to first, two seconds to second, and one second to third) and at the finish of mass-start stages; these were awarded to the first three finishers on all stages. The leader of the classification received a green jersey sponsored by Petronas for the third year running since 2023; it was considered the most important of the race, and the winner of the classification was considered the winner of the race.

Additionally, there was a points classification, in which cyclists received points for finishing in the top 10 of each stage. Points towards the classification could also be won for the first three riders, respectively, at intermediate sprint points during each stage; these intermediate sprints also offered bonus seconds towards the general classification as noted above. The leader will wear an orange jersey, sponsored by the Malaysian Ministry of Youth and Sports.

For the mountains classification, points towards the classification were won by reaching the summit of a climb before other cyclists. Each climb was marked as either hors, first, second, or third-category, with more points available for the higher-categorized climbs. In the 2025 edition, the leader of mountains classification will wear a green polka dot jersey, sponsored by local mineral water company Bubbles O2.

The fourth and final jersey represented the Asian rider classification. This was decided in the same way as the general classification, but only riders registered with cycling association of Asian nation were eligible to be ranked in the classification. The leader wears a white jersey, sponsored by Rakan Muda (Friends of Youth) program, a youth movement under the Malaysian Ministry of Youth and Sports (KBS) through the National Sports Council (MSN).

There was also a team classification, in which the times of the best three cyclists per team on each stage were added together; the leading team at the end of the race was the team with the lowest total time. Also, for every stage, Most Combative Rider award is given by the organizers special jury, to the rider who shows the consistency and effort in attacks, most time spent in breakaway, and positive sportsmanship, among others.

For this edition, the organizers have introduced Best ASEAN rider award for every stage, awarded to the best rider in the daily individual classification that is registered with cycling association of any ASEAN nation.

Classification leadership by stage
| Stage | Winner | General classification | Points classification | Mountains classification | Asian rider classification | Best ASEAN rider | Most combative rider | Team classification |
|---|---|---|---|---|---|---|---|---|
| 1 | Matteo Malucelli | Matteo Malucelli | Matteo Malucelli | Ben Carman | Nur Aiman Rosli | Nur Aiman Rosli | Adrien Maire | Team Picnic–PostNL |
| 2 | Arvid De Kleijn | Matteo Malucelli | Matteo Malucelli | Ben Carman | Nur Aiman Rosli | Wan Abdul Rahman Hamdan | Cedrik Bakke Christophersen | XDS Astana Team |
| 3 | Matteo Malucelli | Matteo Malucelli | Matteo Malucelli | Patrick Eddy | Vadim Pronskiy | Ren Bao Tsen | Jambaljamts Sainbayar | XDS Astana Team |
| 4 | Matteo Malucelli | Matteo Malucelli | Matteo Malucelli | Patrick Eddy | Vadim Pronskiy | Mohamad Izzat Hilmi Abdul Halil | Nur Aiman Rosli | Uno-X Mobility |
| 5 | Joris Delbove | Joris Delbove | Matteo Malucelli | Patrick Eddy | Nicolas Vinokurov | Thanakhan Chaiyasombat | Zeb Kyffin | Unibet Tietema Rockets |
| 6 | Arvid De Kleijn | Joris Delbove | Erlend Blikra | Patrick Eddy | Nicolas Vinokurov | Mohamad Izzat Hilmi Abdul Halil | Kee Zhe Yie | Unibet Tietema Rockets |
| 7 | Zeb Kyffin | Joris Delbove | Erlend Blikra | Patrick Eddy | Nicolas Vinokurov | Nur Aiman Rosli | Nur Aiman Rosli | Unibet Tietema Rockets |
| 8 | Aaron Gate | Joris Delbove | Erlend Blikra | Patrick Eddy | Nicolas Vinokurov | Thanakhan Chaiyasombat | Nil Gimeno | Team Polti VisitMalta |
| Final | | Joris Delbove | Erlend Blikra | Patrick Eddy | Nicolas Vinokurov | None | None | Team Polti VisitMalta |

- On stage 2 and 5, Erlend Blikra, who was second in the points classification, wore the orange jersey, because first-placed Matteo Malucelli wore the green jersey as the leader of the general classification; Arvid de Kleijn who was second in the points classification on stage 3 and 4 wore the orange jersey for the same reason.

== Classification standings ==
Legend
| Denotes the leader of the general classification | Denotes the leader of the mountains classification |
| Denotes the leader of the points classification | Denotes the leader of the Asian rider classification |

=== General classification ===
Final general classification (1–10)
| Rank | Rider | Team | Time |
|---|---|---|---|
| 1 | Joris Delbove (FRA) | Team TotalEnergies | 27h 17' 38" |
| 2 | Anders Halland Johannessen (NOR) | Uno-X Mobility | + 3" |
| 3 | Yannis Voisard (SUI) | Tudor Pro Cycling Team | + 6" |
| 4 | Nicolas Vinokurov (KAZ) | XDS Astana Team | + 11" |
| 5 | Cedrik Bakke Christophersen (NOR) | Unibet Tietema Rockets | + 11" |
| 6 | Fernando Tercero (ESP) | Team Polti VisitMalta | + 14" |
| 7 | Luca Covili (ITA) | VF Group–Bardiani–CSF–Faizanè | + 14" |
| 8 | José Manuel Díaz (ESP) | Burgos Burpellet BH | + 14" |
| 9 | Davide Bais (ITA) | Team Polti VisitMalta | + 14" |
| 10 | Jorge Gutiérrez (ESP) | Equipo Kern Pharma | + 14" |

=== Points classification ===
Final points classification (1–10)
| Rank | Rider | Team | Points |
|---|---|---|---|
| 1 | Erlend Blikra (NOR) | Uno-X Mobility | 63 |
| 2 | Arvid de Kleijn (NED) | Tudor Pro Cycling Team | 51 |
| 3 | Manuel Peñalver (ESP) | Team Polti VisitMalta | 43 |
| 4 | Aaron Gate (NZL) | XDS Astana Team | 37 |
| 5 | Nur Aiman Rosli (MAS) | Terengganu Cycling Team | 33 |
| 6 | Enrico Zanoncello (ITA) | VF Group–Bardiani–CSF–Faizanè | 31 |
| 7 | Zeb Kyffin (GBR) | Unibet Tietema Rockets | 21 |
| 8 | Marc Brustenga (ESP) | Equipo Kern Pharma | 21 |
| 9 | Lorrenzo Manzin (FRA) | Team TotalEnergies | 18 |
| 10 | Mohamad Izzat Hilmi Abdul Halil (MAS) | Malaysia Pro Cycling | 17 |

=== Mountains classification ===
Final mountains classification (1-10)
| Rank | Rider | Team | Points |
|---|---|---|---|
| 1 | Patrick Eddy (AUS) (Note: Eddy tied with Sainbayar on 15 points, however the jersey was awarded to Eddy due to him scoring more points in the Category 1 climb.) | Team Picnic–PostNL | 15 |
| 2 | Jambaljamts Sainbayar (MGL) | Burgos Burpellet BH | 15 |
| 3 | Nil Gimeno (ESP) | Equipo Kern Pharma | 13 |
| 4 | Anders Halland Johannessen (NOR) | Uno-X Mobility | 11 |
| 5 | Joris Delbove (FRA) | Team TotalEnergies | 10 |
| 6 | Cedrik Bakke Christophersen (NOR) | Unibet Tietema Rockets | 7 |
| 7 | Daniel Whitehouse (GBR) | St George Continental Cycling Team | 7 |
| 8 | Yannis Voisard (SUI) | Tudor Pro Cycling Team | 6 |
| 9 | Nur Aiman Rosli (MAS) | Terengganu Cycling Team | 5 |
| 10 | Nicolas Vinokurov (KAZ) | XDS Astana Team | 4 |

=== Asian rider classification ===
Final Asian rider classification (1–10)
| Rank | Rider | Team | Time |
|---|---|---|---|
| 1 | Nicolas Vinokurov (KAZ) | XDS Astana Team | 27h 17' 49" |
| 2 | Thanakhan Chaiyasombat (THA) | Thailand Continental Cycling Team | + 1' 32" |
| 3 | Jambaljamts Sainbayar (MGL) | Burgos Burpellet BH | + 1' 55" |
| 4 | George Matsui (JPN) | Aisan Racing Team | + 4' 37" |
| 5 | Ren Bao Tsen (MAS) | St George Continental Cycling Team | + 6' 51" |
| 6 | Joshua Pascual (PHI) | 7 Eleven–Cliqq Roadbike Philippines | + 7' 15" |
| 7 | Kazuto Minami (JPN) | Aisan Racing Team | + 7' 15" |
| 8 | Astnan Maulana (IDN) | Nusantara–BYC Cycling Team | + 8' 22" |
| 9 | Aphisit Supan (THA) | Thailand Continental Cycling Team | + 8' 53" |
| 10 | Zhe Yie Kee (MAS) | Malaysia | + 10' 38" |

=== Team classification ===
Final team classification (1–10)
| Rank | Team | Time |
|---|---|---|
| 1 | (Italy) Team Polti VisitMalta | 81h 53' 46" |
| 2 | (France) Unibet Tietema Rockets | + 53" |
| 3 | (Spain) Burgos Burpellet BH | + 1' 42" |
| 4 | (Italy) VF Group–Bardiani–CSF–Faizanè | + 2' 07" |
| 5 | (Switzerland) Tudor Pro Cycling Team | + 4' 07" |
| 6 | (Norway) Uno-X Mobility | + 4' 23" |
| 7 | (Malaysia) Terengganu Cycling Team | + 7' 11" |
| 8 | (Spain) Equipo Kern Pharma | + 10' 01" |
| 9 | (Kazakhstan) XDS Astana Team | + 14' 59" |
| 10 | (Netherlands) Team Picnic–PostNL | + 16' 15" |
