= Mohd Shahrul Mat Amin =

Malaysian cyclist

Personal information
- Full name: Mohd Shahrul bin Mat Amin
- Born: 9 June 1989 (age 37) Marang, Terengganu, Malaysia
- Height: 1.64 m (5 ft 5 in)
- Weight: 54 kg (119 lb)

Cycling career
- Sport: Cycling
- Current team: Retired
- Discipline: Road
- Role: Rider
- Rider type: Sprinter

Professional teams
- 2008: MNCF Cycling Team
- 2011–2023: Terengganu Cycling Team

Mohd Shahrul Mat Amin (born 9 June 1989) is a Malaysian former cyclist, who competed as a professional in 2008 and from 2011 to 2023.

== Major results ==
2010
1st Stage 1 Jelajah Malaysia
2nd Road race, National Road Championships
3rd Melaka Governor Cup
2011
1st Road race, National Road Championships
1st Stage 4 Tour de Brunei
1st Stage 7 Tour d'Indonesia
10th Melaka Chief Minister's Cup
2012
1st Stage 3 Jelajah Malaysia
Perlis Open

1st Stages 1 & 3

8th Tour de Okinawa
8th Overall Tour of Borneo
2013
1st Road race, National Road Championships
1st Points classification Tour de Ijen
1st Stage 3 Tour de Taiwan
2014
7th Melaka Chief Minister's Cup
2016
1st Stage 8 Tour de Singkarak
National Road Championships

3rd Road race
3rd Time trial

2017
1st Stage 9 Tour de Singkarak
1st Stage 4 Tour de Lombok
2nd Road race, Southeast Asian Games
2019
4th Road race, National Road Championships
