= Mohd Nor Umardi Rosdi =

Malaysian cyclist

Personal information
- Full name: Mohd Nor Umardi Rosdi
- Born: 11 August 1986 (age 40)

Cycling career
- Sport: Cycling
- Discipline: Road
- Role: Rider

Professional teams
- 2007: LeTua Cycling Team
- 2011–2019: Terengganu Cycling Team

Major wins
- One-day races and Classics National Time Trial Championships (2016)

Mohd Nor Umardi Rosdi (born 11 August 1986) is a Malaysian cyclist, who last rode for UCI Continental team Terengganu Inc. TSG.

== Major results ==
2012
1st Stage 1 Tour de Brunei
2013
CFI International Race

1st Delhi
4th Mumbai
9th Jaipur

2nd Time trial, National Road Championships
2014
10th Overall Jelajah Malaysia
2015
2nd Road race, National Road Championships
2016
1st Time trial, National Road Championships
2019
3rd Time trial, National Road Championships
