= Zeb Kyffin =

British cyclist

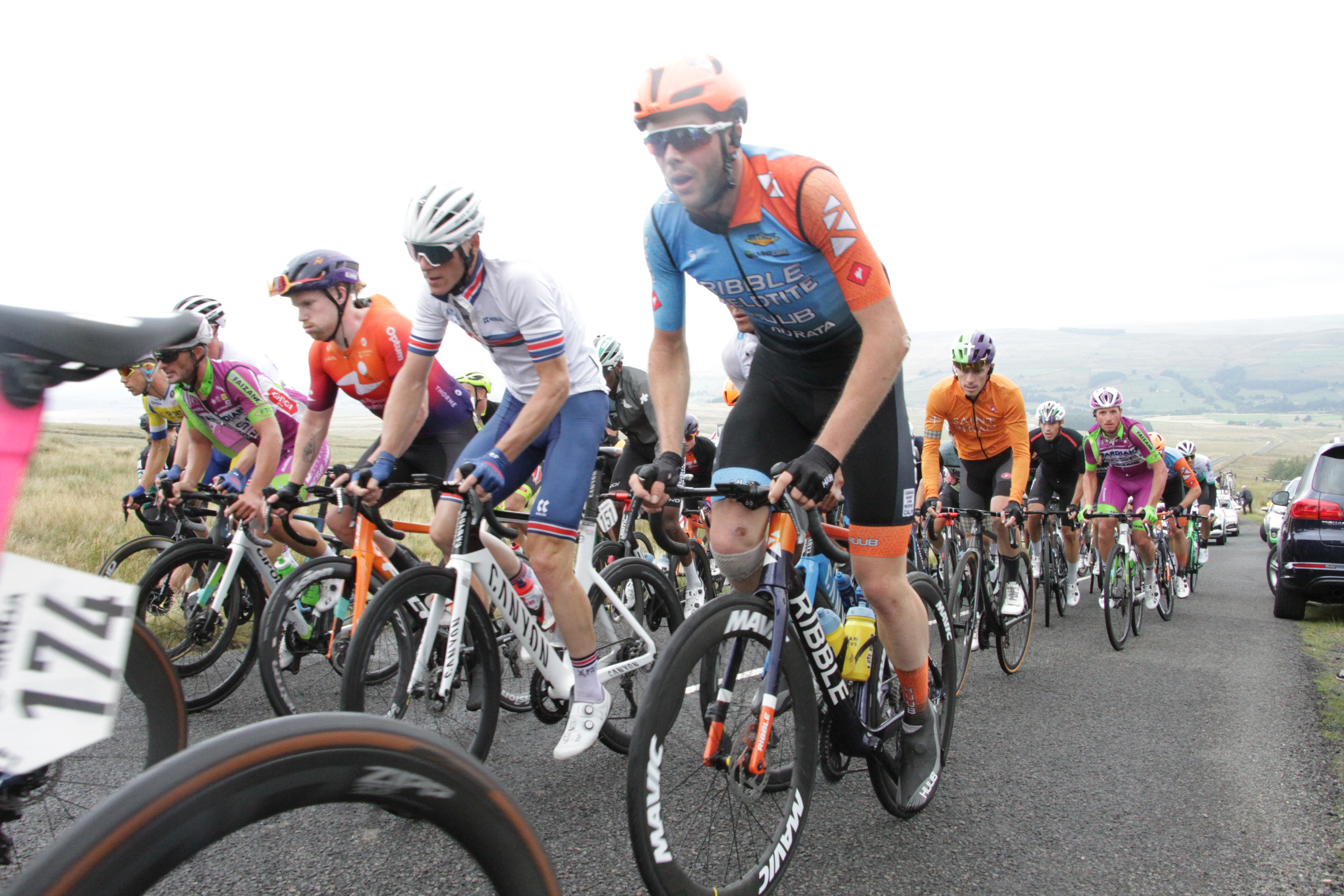
- Kyffin at the 2022 Tour of Britain

Personal information
- Full name: Zeb Montague Kyffin
- Born: 23 February 1998 (age 28) United Kingdom
- Height: 188 cm (6 ft 2 in)
- Weight: 72 kg (159 lb; 11 st 5 lb)

Cycling career
- Sport: Cycling
- Current team: Terengganu Cycling Team
- Discipline: Road
- Role: Rider
- Rider type: Rouleur

Amateur teams
- 2013–2016: Gosforth RC
- 2017: GS Metro
- 2018: HUUB Ribble Performance Academy
- 2018: Ribble Pro Cycling

Professional teams
- 2019–2022: Ribble Pro Cycling
- 2023: Saint Piran
- 2024–2025: TDT–Unibet Cycling Team
- 2026-: Terengganu Cycling Team

Zeb Montague Kyffin (born 23 February 1998) is a British cyclist who currently rides for Terengganu Cycling Team.

== Career ==
In 2017 Kyffin finished in the top ten during the 2017 British National Hill Climb Championships.

In 2018 Kyffin joined the British road racing team Ribble Pro Cycling, finishing twelfth in the under-23 element of the British National Road Race Championships.

In 2019 he participated in the Tour de Yorkshire, the British National Road Race Championships, and the British National Time Trial Championships; he also competed in the Saudi Tour in 2020.

In 2021 after the gradual alleviation of COVID-19 restrictions in the United Kingdom, Kyffin won the Chitterne Road Race - thus, becoming the first UCI continental rider to win a British national road race since 2019.

In 2024, Kyffin joined UCI ProTeam TDT–Unibet Cycling Team. With Unibet, he won his first professional race, in Stage 7 of 2025 Tour de Langkawi.

Kyffin's contract with Unibet Tietema Rockets were not renewed at the end of 2025. Subsequently, he joined UCI Continental Team Terengganu Cycling Team.

== Personal life ==
Kyffin, born in London and shortly after, lived in Eindhoven, the Netherlands, until he was twelve years old. He then moved to Newcastle upon Tyne and was educated at Newcastle School for Boys and latterly Northumbria University. He returned to London in 2020.

== Major results ==
2015
3rd Richmond Road Race
2017
1st Ilkley TTT (with Tim Wilcock and Danny Grieves)
1st iMann Trophy
2nd Clifton Road Race
2nd Reivers Road Race
2nd PTR Summer Series
3rd Ilkley Road Race
3rd Stuart Ayre Memorial Trophy
2018
2nd Scottish National Alba Series - John Gordon Memorial
3rd Anderside Classic
2019
1st North East Regional Road Race Championship
1st Scottish National Alba Series - Hugh Dornan Memorial
1st Stage 2 Tour of the North
2nd John May Memorial Road Race
2nd Wold Top the Edge
3rd GT Ellingworth/GA Bennett Road Race
2021
1st Chitterne Road Race
2022
1st RCR FatCreations Road Race
1st Stage 3 Manx Telecom International Stage Race
1st Stage 2 The Peaks 2 Day
2023
1st Overall National Road Series
1st Lancaster Grand Prix
2nd Lincoln Grand Prix
2nd RCR FatCreations Road Race
2nd Overall Kreiz Breizh Elites
3rd Perfs Pedal Race
4th Overall Tour du Pays de Montbéliard
6th Overall Tour of Britain
6th Sundvolden GP
9th Ringerike GP
2024
10th British National Time Trial Championships
2025 (1 pro win)
1st Stage 7 Tour de Langkawi
2026
3rd Grand Prix Pedalia
6th Overall Pune Grand Tour
7th Overall Tour de Kumano
