= Jang Chan-jae =

South Korean cyclist

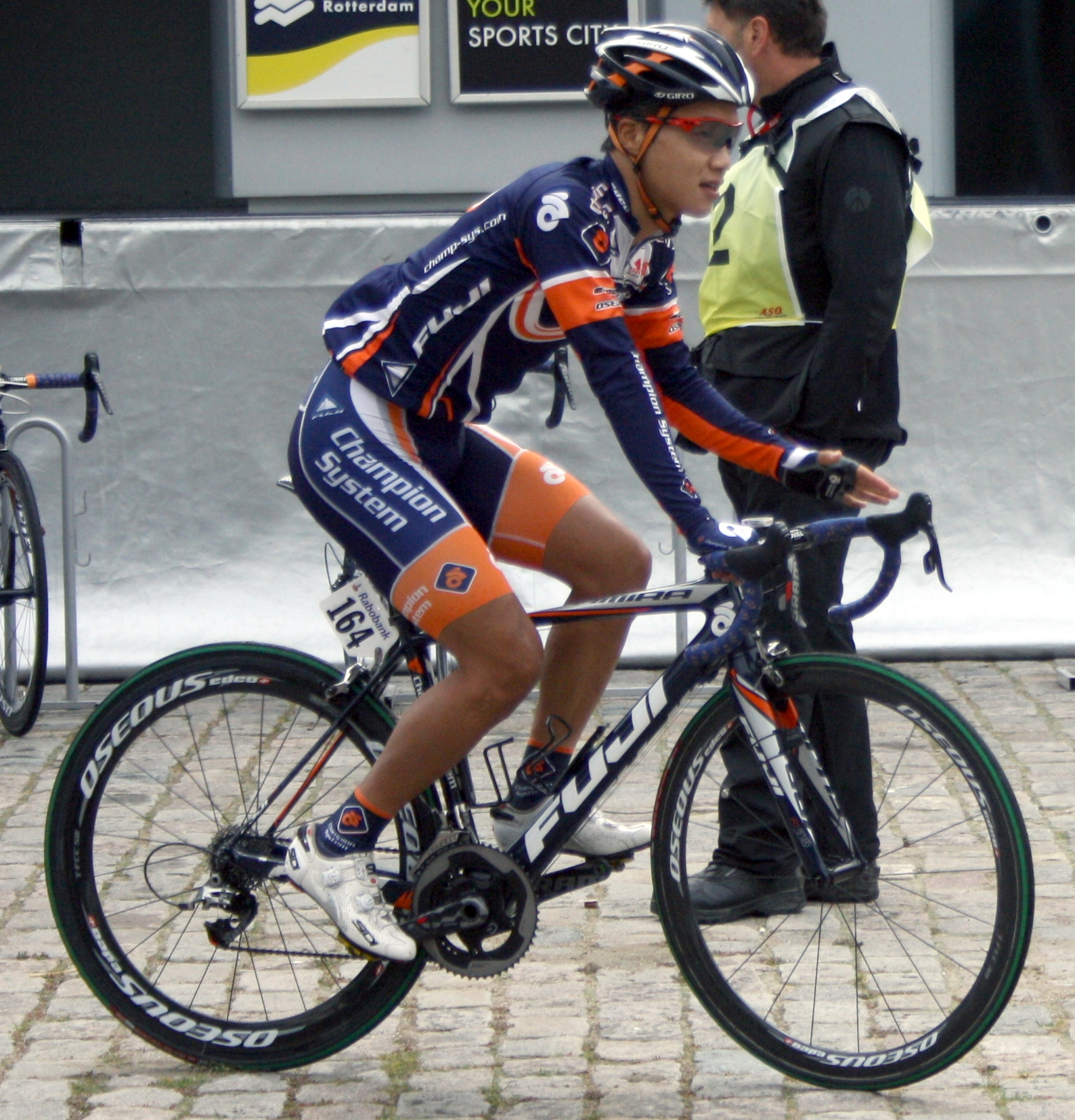
- Jang Chan-jae at the 2013 World Ports Classic

Personal information
- Full name: Jang Chan-jae
- Born: January 6, 1989 (age 37)
- Height: 175 cm (5 ft 9 in)
- Weight: 64 kg (141 lb)

Cycling career
- Sport: Cycling
- Current team: Retired
- Discipline: Road
- Role: Rider

Amateur team
- 2009–2010: World Cycling Centre

Professional teams
- 2012: Terengganu Cycling Team
- 2013: Champion System
- 2014: OCBC Singapore Continental Cycling Team
- 2015: Attaque Team Gusto

Jang Chan-jae (born January 6, 1989) is a South Korean former professional cyclist.

== Major results ==
2010
1st Stage 2 Tour of Seoul
2011
1st Overall Jeolginyeon Stage Race

1st Stage 2

1st Stage 2 Tour de Korea
1st Stage 7b Tour de Singkarak
2012
1st Road race, National Road Championships
1st Stage 3 Tour de Korea
9th Road race, Asian Road Championships
2013
3rd Road race, National Road Championships
2014
3rd Road race, National Road Championships
10th Melaka Governor's Cup
