= Nur Amirul Fakhruddin Mazuki =

Malaysian cyclist

Personal information
- Full name: Nur Amirul Fakhruddin Mazuki
- Born: 24 January 1992 (age 34) Miri, Malaysia

Cycling career
- Sport: Cycling
- Current team: Terengganu Cycling Team
- Discipline: Road
- Role: Rider

Professional team
- 2011–: Terengganu Cycling Team

Major wins
- One-day races and Classics National Road Race Championships (2015, 2019, 2024)
Medal record
Representing (Malaysia) Malaysia
Men's road bicycle racing
Southeast Asian Games
Gold medal – first place	2023 Cambodia	Road race

Nur Amirul Fakhruddin Mazuki (born 24 January 1992) is a Malaysian cyclist, who currently rides for UCI Continental team Terengganu Cycling Team.

== Major results ==
2011
5th Melaka Governor's Cup
2012
4th Overall Tour de Ijen
2013
CFI International Race

1st Mumbai
2nd Delhi

National Road Championships

2nd Road race
3rd Time trial

6th Melaka Governor's Cup
2015
1st Road race, National Road Championships
1st Mountains classification Jelajah Malaysia
1st Mountains classification Sharjah Cycling Tour
5th Overall Tour of Borneo

1st Points classification
1st Stage 4

7th UAE Cup
2017
Jelajah Malaysia

1st Points classification
1st Stage 1

5th Road race, Southeast Asian Games
2018
10th Overall Tour of Fuzhou
10th Overall Sri Lanka T-Cup
2019
1st Road race, National Road Championships
1st Overall Tour de Siak

1st Points classification
1st Stage 1

1st Stage 3 Tour of Peninsular
3rd Overall Tour de Hokkaido
10th Oita Urban Classic
2020
2nd Road race, National Road Championships
2022
2nd Road race, National Road Championships
2023
1st Road race, Southeast Asian Games
National Road Championships

3rd Time trial
5th Road race

2024
1st Road race, National Road Championships
2026
2nd Road race, National Road Championships
