= Erlend Blikra =

Norwegian cyclist

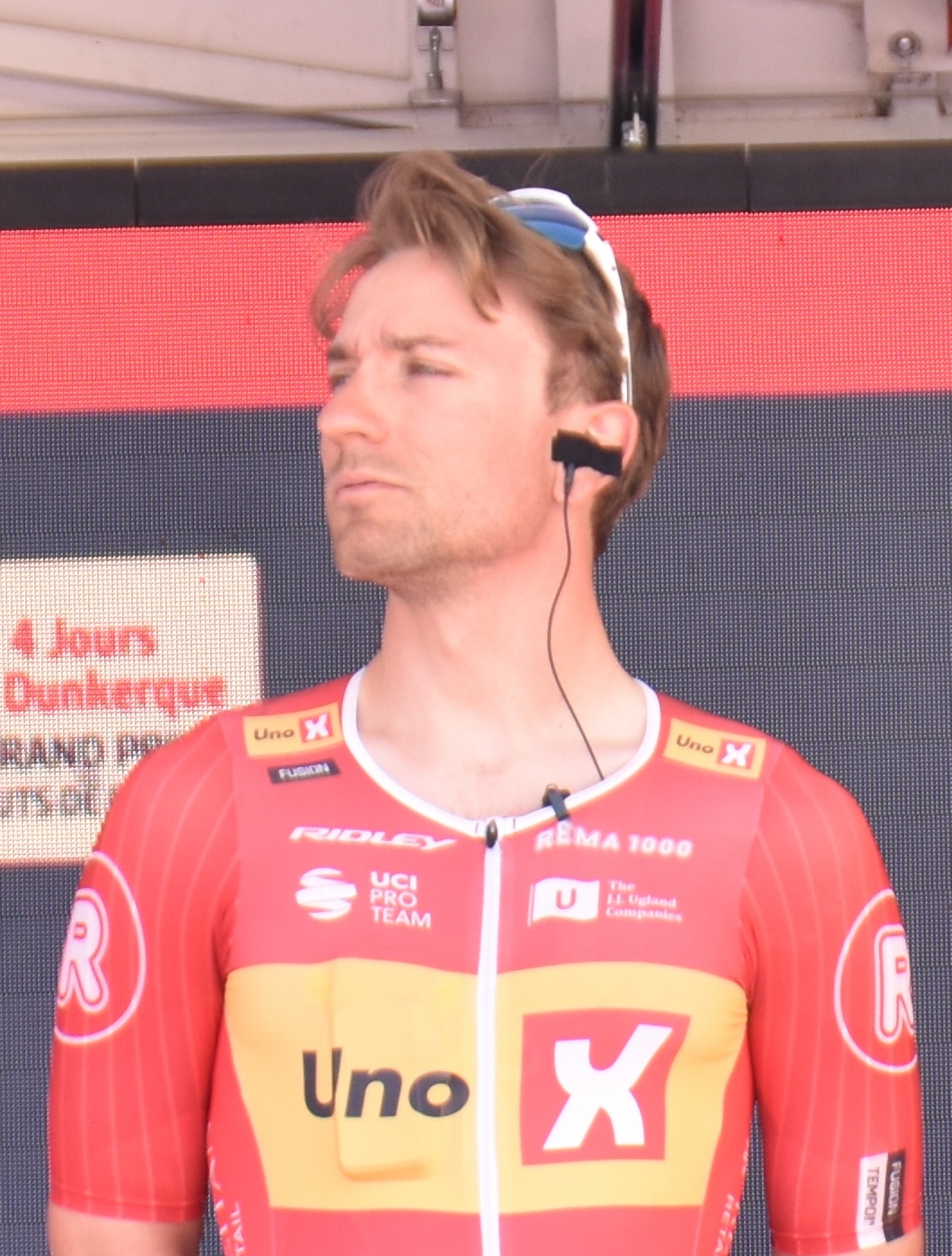
- Blikra in 2025

Personal information
- Full name: Erlend Blikra
- Born: 11 January 1997 (age 29) Stavanger, Norway
- Height: 1.83 m (6 ft 0 in)
- Weight: 75 kg (165 lb)

Cycling career
- Sport: Cycling
- Current team: Uno-X Mobility
- Discipline: Road
- Role: Rider

Amateur team
- 2014–2016: Stavanger SK

Professional teams
- 2016–2019: Team Coop–Øster Hus
- 2020–: Uno-X Norwegian Development Team

Erlend Blikra (born 11 January 1997) is a Norwegian racing cyclist, who currently rides for UCI ProTeam Uno-X Mobility.

== Major results ==
2013
1st Time trial, European Youth Summer Olympic Festival
2014
National Junior Road Championships

1st Time trial
2nd Road race

1st Overall Trophée Centre Morbihan

1st Points classification
1st Young rider classification
1st Stages 1 & 2 (ITT)

1st Stage 2b Course de la Paix Juniors
4th Overall Tour of Istria

1st Young rider classification

2018
1st Criterium, National Road Championships
2019
Dookoła Mazowsza

1st Prologue, Stages 1 & 2

2020
1st International Rhodes Grand Prix
1st Stage 2 International Tour of Rhodes
2021
1st Stage 3 Tour de la Mirabelle
8th Overall A Travers les Hauts de France
10th Omloop van het Houtland
2022 (1 pro win)
Tour de Langkawi

1st Points classification
1st Stage 6

9th Elfstedenronde
2023 (1)
1st Stage 2 Région Pays de la Loire Tour
1st Stage 3 Olympia's Tour
4th Elfstedenronde
5th Ronde van Limburg
2024
6th Gooikse Pijl
2025 (1)
1st La Roue Tourangelle
1st Points classification, Tour de Langkawi
3rd Trofeo Palma
3rd Trofeo Ses Salines
5th Classic Brugge–De Panne
5th Kampioenschap van Vlaanderen
2026 (2)
1st Stage 2 Arctic Race of Norway
1st Stage 4 Tour of Oman
