= Batmönkhiin Maral-Erdene =

Mongolian cyclist

Personal information
- Full name: Batmönkhiin Maral-Erdene
- Born: October 15, 1994 (age 32) Khövsgöl Province, Mongolia

Cycling career
- Sport: Cycling
- Current team: Nusantara Cycling Team
- Discipline: Road
- Role: Rider

Professional teams
- 2013: Malak Cycling Team
- 2014–2015: Ningxia Sports Lottery Cycling Team
- 2016–2020: Terengganu Cycling Team
- 2022–2023: Levante Fuji Shizuoka
- 2024–: Nusantara Cycling Team
Medal record
Men's road cycling
Representing Mongolia
World University Cycling Championship
Silver medal – second place	2016 Tagaytay	Road race
Asian Championships
Gold medal – first place	2016 Oshima	Under-23 time trial
Silver medal – second place	2022 Dushanbe	Team time trial

Batmönkhiin Maral-Erdene (Mongolian: Батмөнхийн Марал-Эрдэнэ; born 15 October 1994) is a Mongolian professional road bicycle racer, who currently rides for UCI Continental team Nusantara Cycling Team.

== Career ==
=== Early life ===
Maral-Erdene was born in 1994 in the province of Khövsgöl in Mongolia. His grandfather is a cycling coach who organizes cycling competitions in the province. Maral-Erdene's grandfather encourages his children and grandchildren to develop cycling in their home province which led to Maral-Erdene taking up the sport in 2007.

=== Professional career ===
Maral-Erdene started his professional cycling career with teams in China before moving to the Malaysia-based Terengganu Cycling Team in 2016 which joins more UCI-sanctioned competition. From March 2016, Mongolian cycling-figure Jamsran Ulzii-Orshikh serves as his coach whom he idolized since childhood.

== Major results ==
2011
2nd Time trial, National Junior Road Championships
2014
2nd Road race, National Road Championships
8th Time trial, Asian Under-23 Road Championships
2015
National Road Championships

4th Time trial
5th Road race

2016
Asian Under-23 Road Championships

1st Time trial
10th Road race

National Road Championships

1st Time trial
5th Road race

1st Mountains classification, Tour of China I
2nd Road race, World University Cycling Championship
3rd Overall Tour de Filipinas
2017
National Road Championships

1st Time trial
2nd Road race

1st Stage 2 Tour de Tochigi
5th Overall Tour of Xingtai
6th Time trial, Asian Road Championships
2018
National Road Championships

1st Road race
1st Time trial

Asian Road Championships

4th Team time trial
6th Time trial

6th Overall Tour of Quanzhou Bay
2019
1st Stage 4 Tour of Thailand
1st Stage 1 Tour de Ijen
2nd Oita Urban Classic
3rd Road race, National Road Championships
Asian Road Championships

4th Team time trial
6th Time trial

2022
National Road Championships

1st Road race
3rd Time trial

2nd Team time trial, Asian Road Championships
2023
National Road Championships

1st Time trial
5th Road race

1st Stage 2 Tour of Poyang Lake
7th Overall Tour de Kumano
