= Drew Morey =

Australian cyclist (born 1996)

Personal information
- Full name: Drew Morey
- Born: 27 November 1996 (age 29)
- Height: 1.78 m (5 ft 10 in)

Cycling career
- Sport: Cycling
- Current team: Kinan Racing Team
- Discipline: Road
- Role: Rider

Professional teams
- 2017: Drapac–Pat's Veg
- 2017–2018: Terengganu Cycling Team
- 2018: Mitchelton–BikeExchange
- 2019–2020: Terengganu Inc. TSG
- 2021–2022: Team BridgeLane
- 2023–: Kinan Racing Team

Drew Morey (born 27 November 1996) is an Australian cyclist, who currently rides for UCI Continental team Kinan Racing Team.

== Major results ==
2017
1st Stage 1 Tour de Flores
2nd Overall Tour of Quanzhou Bay
4th Overall Tour of Fuzhou
7th Overall Tour de Ijen
10th Road race, Oceania Road Championships
10th Overall Tour de Hokkaido
2019
1st Oita Urban Classic
5th Overall Tour of Japan
2022
5th Road race, National Road Championships
2023
3rd Oita Urban Classic
4th Road race, National Road Championships
4th Overall Tour of Sharjah
Oceania Road Championships

5th Time trial
8th Road race

5th Overall New Zealand Cycle Classic
5th Overall Tour of Japan
6th Overall Tour de Taiwan
2024
Oceania Road Championships

5th Individual Time Trial
7th Road Race

6th Overall Tour de Kumano
9th Overall Tour of Japan
