= GP Antalya =

Turkish one-day road cycling race

Race details
- Date: February
- Discipline: Road
- Competition: UCI Europe Tour
- Type: One-day race

History
- First edition: 2020
- Editions: 4 (as of 2026)
- First winner: Maxim Piskunov (RUS)
- Most wins: No repeat winners
- Most recent: Mustafa Tarakcı (TUR)

The GP Antalya is a single-day road bicycle race held annually in February in Turkey. It is part of UCI Europe Tour in category 1.2.

== Winners ==
Year	Country	Rider	Team
2020	Russia	Maxim Piskunov	Marathon–Tula
2021–2023	No race		
2024	China	Ma Binyan	China Glory–Mentech Continental Cycling Team
2025	Malaysia	Wan Abdul Rahman Hamdan	Terengganu Cycling Team
2026	Turkey	Mustafa Tarakcı	Konya Büyükşehir Belediyespor
