= Patrick Eddy =

Australian cyclist (born 2002)

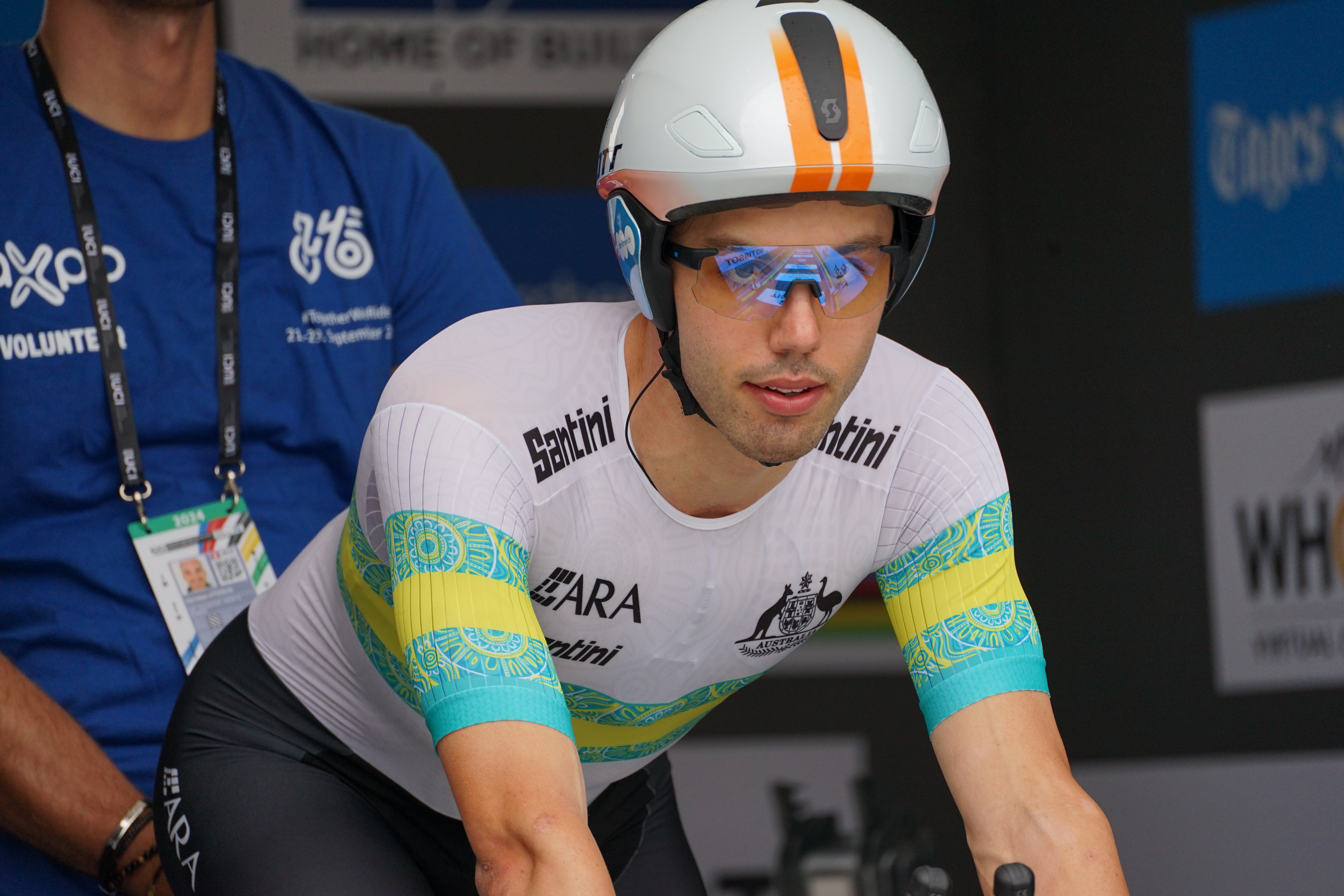
- Patrick Eddy during the 2024 World Championships

Personal information
- Born: 17 October 2002 (age 23) Echuca, Australia
- Height: 1.85 m (6 ft 1 in)
- Weight: 79 kg (174 lb)

Cycling career
- Sport: Cycling
- Current team: Team Brennan
- Disciplines: Road; Track
- Role: Rider

Amateur team
- 2019–2020: InForm TM Insight MAKE

Professional teams
- 2021: Team BridgeLane
- 2022–2023: Development Team Sunweb
- 2024–2025: Team dsm–firmenich PostNL
- 2026–: Team Brennan

Major wins
- One-day races and Classics National Road Race Championships (2026)

Patrick Eddy (born 17 October 2002) is an Australian cyclist, who currently rides for UCI Continental Team Team Brennan.

== Major results ==
=== Road ===
2019
National Junior Championships

1st Road race
1st Time trial

4th Time trial, Oceania Junior Championships
2020
National Junior Championships

1st Time trial
2nd Road race

2021
3rd Time trial, National Under-23 Championships
2025
1st Mountains classification, Tour de Langkawi
2026 (1 pro win)
1st Road race, National Championships
1st Ronde van Overijssel
1st Midden-Brabant Poort Omloop
1st Overall Ronde de l'Oise
1st Stage 2 Harbour City GP (ProVelo Super League)
2nd Omloop van het Waasland
2nd Slag om Woensdrecht
4th Melbourne to Warrnambool Classic (ProVelo Super League)
8th Muur Classic Geraardsbergen

==== Grand Tour general classification results timeline ====
Grand Tour	2025
Giro d'Italia	—
Tour de France	—
Vuelta a España	151

=== Track ===
2021
1st Team pursuit, National Championships
