= Joris Delbove =

French cyclist

- 2026

Personal information
- Born: 15 July 2000 (age 26) Troyes, France

Cycling career
- Sport: Cycling
- Current team: Team TotalEnergies
- Disciplines: Road; Cyclo-cross
- Role: Rider

Amateur team
- 2019–2021: SCO Dijon

Professional teams
- 2021: St. Michel–Auber93 (stagiaire)
- 2022–2024: St. Michel–Auber93
- 2025–: Team TotalEnergies

Major wins
- Cyclo-cross National Championships (2026) Road Stage races Tour de Langkawi (2025)

Joris Delbove (born 15 July 2000), is a French cyclist who currently rides for UCI ProTeam Team TotalEnergies.

== Career ==
From Aube, Delbove rode as an amateur for SCO Dijon. He has competed in cyclo cross as well as road race cycling. He had a top ten finish in the general classification at the 2021 Tour de l'Avenir. He finished as runner-up at the 2021 and 2022 French National Cyclo-cross Championships U23 races. He was selected to participate at the UCI Cyclo-cross World Championships in Fayetteville, Arkansas in January 2022.

Delbove had a truncated start to the 2023 road racing season due to injury. Delbove had a top 15 finish at the Tour de l'Ain in 2023. He finished fourth at the 2023 UCI ProSeries event Paris–Tours on 8 October 2023. His results helped his St. Michel–Mavic–Auber93 team finish the 2023 season as one of the top ranked French teams on the UCI Continental Tour. His contract with the team was extended for the 2024 season.

== Personal life ==
His father, Jimmy Delbove, and his uncle, Jérôme Delbove, were also French professional cyclists.

== Major results ==
=== Cyclo-cross ===
2017–2018
Junior Coupe de France

1st Besançon
2nd La Meziere

2019–2020
3rd National Under-23 Championships
Under-23 Coupe de France

3rd La Meziere

2020–2021
2nd National Under-23 Championships
2021–2022
1st Overall Under-23 Coupe de France

2nd Bagnoles de l'Orne II
2nd Troyes I
3rd Quelneuc II

2nd National Under-23 Championships
2025–2026
1st National Championships

=== Road ===
2018
6th La Classique des Alpes Juniors
10th Grand Prix Bob Jungels
2021
1st Tour du Gévaudan Occitanie
10th Overall Tour de l'Avenir
2022
9th Tour du Finistère
2023
1st Young rider classification, Tour de l'Ain
4th Paris–Tours
9th Overall Tour du Limousin
2024
1st Overall Tour Alsace
8th Paris–Camembert
2025 (3 pro wins)
1st Overall Tour de Langkawi

1st Stage 5

1st Stage 4 Tour du Rwanda
7th Clásica Terres de l'Ebre
8th Overall Vuelta a Asturias
9th Circuito de Getxo
2026
7th Memorial Marco Pantani
9th Overall Arctic Race of Norway
