= Wan Abdul Rahman Hamdan =

Malaysian cyclist

Wan Abdul Rahman
Personal information
- Full name: Wan Abdul Rahman bin Hamdan
- Born: 19 June 1999 (age 27) Malaysia

Cycling career
- Sport: Cycling
- Current team: Terengganu Cycling Team
- Discipline: Road
- Role: Sprinter

Professional teams
- 2018: Forca Amskins Racing
- 2020–: Terengganu Inc. TSG

Wan Abdul Rahman bin Hamdan (born 19 June 1999) is a Malaysian professional racing cyclist, who currently rides for UCI Continental team Terengganu Cycling Team.

He won GP Antalya in 2025, only the second Malaysian to win a UCI-sanctioned race in Europe after Harrif Salleh in 2021.

== Major results ==
2016
1st Road race, National Junior Road Championships
2021
National Under-23 Road Championships

1st Road race
2nd Time trial

2024
3rd Overall Tour de Batam
2025
1st Grand Prix Antalya
1st Stage 3 Tour of Route Salvation
