= GP Manavgat =

Race details
- Date: February or March
- Discipline: Road
- Competition: UCI Europe Tour
- Type: One-day race
- Web site: www.cycleinturkey.com

History
- First edition: 2020
- Editions: 3 (as of 2022)
- First winner: Branislau Samoilau (BLR)
- Most wins: No repeat winners
- Most recent: Mamyr Stash

The GP Manavgat is a cycling race held in Turkey. It is part of UCI Europe Tour in category 1.2.

== Winners ==
Year	Country	Rider	Team
2020	Belarus	Branislau Samoilau	Minsk Cycling Club
2021	Malaysia	Harrif Saleh	Terengganu Cycling Team
2022		Mamyr Stash	Cycling Sport Club OLYMP
