= Davide Bais =

Italian cyclist (born 1998)

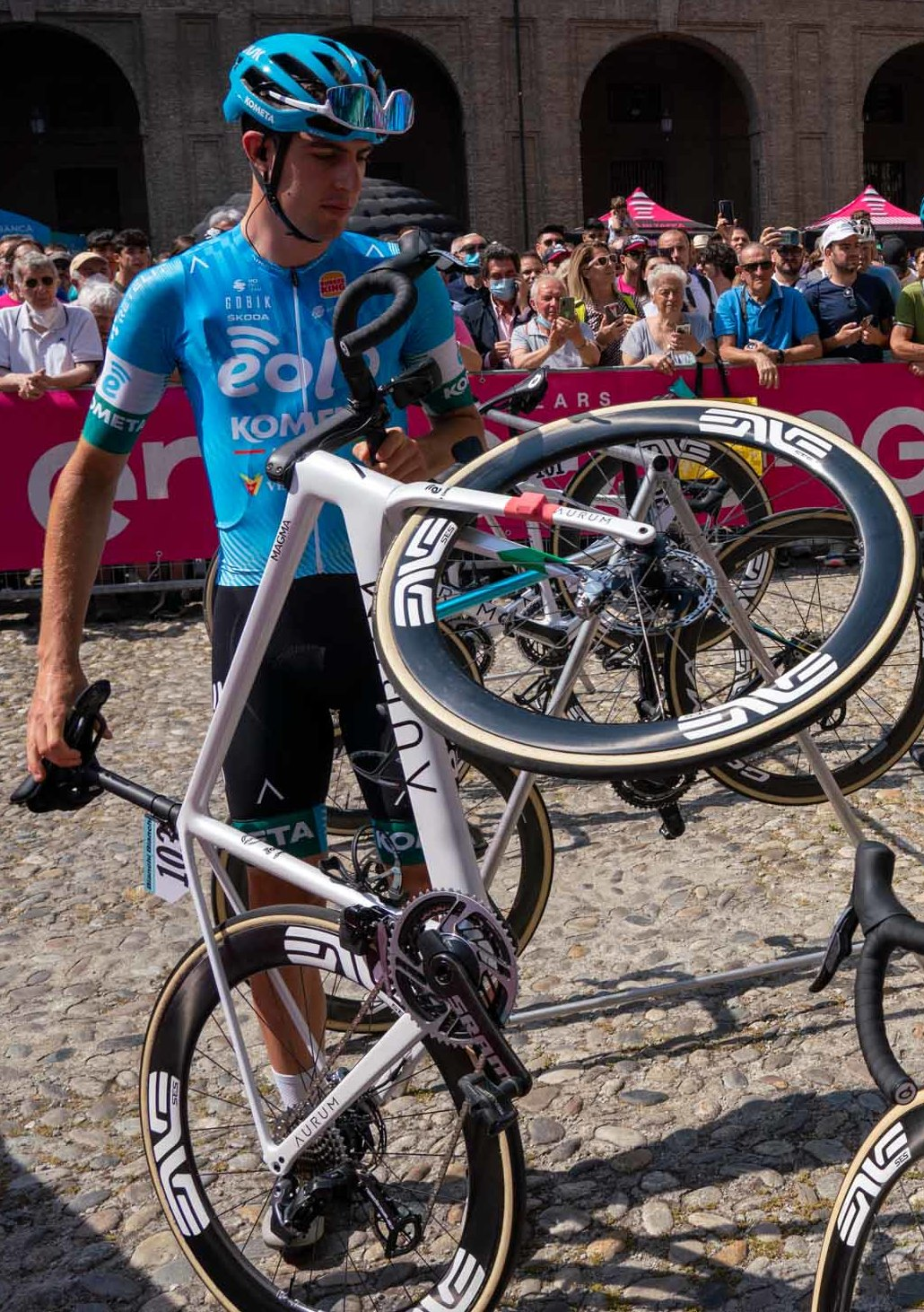
- Bais at the 2022 Giro d'Italia

Personal information
- Born: 2 April 1998 (age 28) Rovereto, Italy
- Height: 1.85 m (6 ft 1 in)
- Weight: 66 kg (146 lb)

Cycling career
- Sport: Cycling
- Current team: Team Polti VisitMalta
- Discipline: Road
- Role: Rider

Amateur teams
- 2011–2012: SC Mori
- 2013–2014: Forti e Veloci
- 2016: Montecorona Mak Costruzioni–Multipli Arcese
- 2017: Trentino U23
- 2018: Cycling Team Friuli

Professional teams
- 2019–2020: Cycling Team Friuli
- 2021–: Eolo–Kometa

Major wins
- Grand Tours Giro d'Italia 1 individual stage (2023)

Davide Bais (born 2 April 1998) is an Italian racing cyclist, who currently rides for UCI ProTeam Team Polti VisitMalta. He won stage seven of the 2023 Giro d'Italia from the breakaway on a mountain-top finish. His older brother Mattia is also a professional cyclist.

== Major results ==
2018
8th Overall Gemenc Grand Prix
9th Trofeo Città di San Vendemiano
2019
6th Trofeo Città di San Vendemiano
9th Overall Tour of Romania
9th Trofeo Edil C
10th Piccolo Giro di Lombardia
10th Giro del Belvedere
2021
1st Mountains classification, Tour du Limousin
2022
8th Coppa Bernocchi
8th Giro del Veneto
2023 (1 pro win)
Giro d'Italia

1st Stage 7
Held after Stages 7–12 & 14–15

2025
2nd Giro della Provincia di Reggio Calabria
9th Overall Tour de Langkawi

=== Grand Tour general classification results timeline ===
Grand Tour	2022	2023	2024
Giro d'Italia	125	81	76
Tour de France	—	—	—
Vuelta a España	—	—	—

Legend
—	Did not compete
DNF	Did not finish
