= Harrif Saleh =

Malaysian cyclist

Personal information
- Full name: Mohamed Harrif Saleh
- Born: 15 September 1988 (age 38) Terengganu, Malaysia

Cycling career
- Sport: Cycling
- Discipline: Road
- Role: Sprinter

Professional teams
- 2008–2009: MNCF Cycling Team
- 2011–2025: Terengganu Cycling Team
Medal record
Men's Track cycling
Representing Malaysia
Asian Cycling Championships
Gold medal – first place	2007 Nakhon Ratchasima	Scratch
Bronze medal – third place	2012 Kuala Lumpur	Scratch
Southeast Asian Games
Gold medal – first place	2007 Nakhon Ratchasima	Team pursuit
Gold medal – first place	2011 Jakarta-Palembang	Team pursuit
Gold medal – first place	2011 Jakarta-Palembang	Scratch
Men's Road bicycle race
Representing Malaysia
Southeast Asian Games
Gold medal – first place	2015 Singapore	Road race
Gold medal – first place	2015 Singapore	Criterium
Gold medal – first place	2017 Kuala Lumpur	Criterium

Mohamed Harrif Saleh (born 15 September 1988) is a former Malaysian professional racing cyclist.

He spent most of his professional career riding for UCI Continental team Terengganu Cycling Team, from 2011 to 2025. He won 20 UCI races thourghout his career, and becomes the first Malaysian to won a UCI-sanctioned race in Europe, when he won GP Manavgat in 2021.

== Major results ==
2007
1st Scratch, Asian Track Championships
1st Team pursuit, Southeast Asian Games
1st Stage 2 Jelajah Malaysia
Ho Chi Minh City Television Cup

1st Stages 7 & 12

1st Stage 3 Tour of Negeri Sembilan
3rd Overall Melaka Chief Minister Cup

1st Stage 2

2008
1st Stage 2 Tour of South China Sea
2010
1st Stage 8 Tour of Gippsland
Tour of the Murray River

1st Stages 2, 7, 8 & 14

2011
Southeast Asian Games

1st Scratch
1st Team pursuit

1st Stage 3 Tour de Brunei
2012
Jelajah Malaysia

1st Stages 4 & 5

Tour of Vietnam

1st Points classification
1st Stages 3 & 5

3rd Scratch, Asian Track Championships
3rd Overall Tour de Brunei

1st Stage 4

2013
Jelajah Malaysia

1st Points classification
1st Stage 3

1st Stage 3 Tour of Borneo
2014
Jelajah Malaysia

1st Points classification
1st Stage 5

1st Stage 4 Sharjah International Cycling Tour
10th Overall Tour of Taihu Lake
2015
Southeast Asian Games

1st Criterium
1st Road race

1st Stage 3 Tour de Filipinas
2016
Tour of Thailand

1st Stages 3 & 4

1st Stage 3 Jelajah Malaysia
2nd Road race, National Road Championships
2017
1st Criterium, Southeast Asian Games
1st Stage 5 Jelajah Malaysia
2018
1st Stage 3 Sri Lanka T-Cup
8th Overall Tour de Siak
2019
1st Stage 2 Tour de Langkawi
1st Stage 5 Tour de Selangor
2020
Tour de Langkawi

1st Stages 5 & 7

2021
1st GP Manavgat
4th GP Mediterrennean
2022
Tour of Thailand

1st Stages 3 & 4

1st Stage 5 Tour de Taiwan
2nd Grand Prix Justiniano Hotels

== Honours ==
- Terengganu :
  - Recipient of the Meritorious Service Medal (PJK) (2012)
