= Vojtěch Kmínek =

Czech cyclist (born 2000)

Personal information
- Born: 11 September 2000 (age 26) Vrbno pod Pradědem, Czech Republic
- Height: 1.87 m (6 ft 2 in)
- Weight: 75 kg (165 lb)

Cycling career
- Sport: Cycling
- Current team: Burgos Burpellet BH
- Discipline: Road
- Role: Rider

Amateur teams
- 2017–2018: Mapei Merida Kaňkovský
- 2019–2022: TJ Favorit Brno
- 2023–2024: Club Ciclista Padronés–Cortizo

Professional team
- 2025–: Burgos Burpellet BH

Vojtěch Kmínek (born 11 September 2000) is a Czech cyclist. He currently rides for UCI ProTeam Burgos Burpellet BH.

== Major results ==
2021
4th Road race, National Under-23 Road Championships
2022
1st Stages 1 & 3 Trenčianským Regionom
3rd Velká cena Hradce Králové
2023
1st Vuelta la Comarca Brigantina
1st Gran Premio Concello do Porriño
1st Domaio Heroica
1st Stage 2 Vuelta Ciclista a Zamora
4th Circuito del Guadiana
6th Memorial Pascual Momparler
2024
1st Circuito del Guadiana
1st Stage 3 Volta a la Provincia de València
3rd Road race, National Road Championships
5th Gran Premio Primavera de Ontur
5th Clásica Valladolid – Memorial Ángel Lozano y Jesús Nieto
5th Vuelta la Comarca Brigantina
6th Overall Memorial Sanroma
