= Terengganu Cycling Team =

Malaysian cycling team

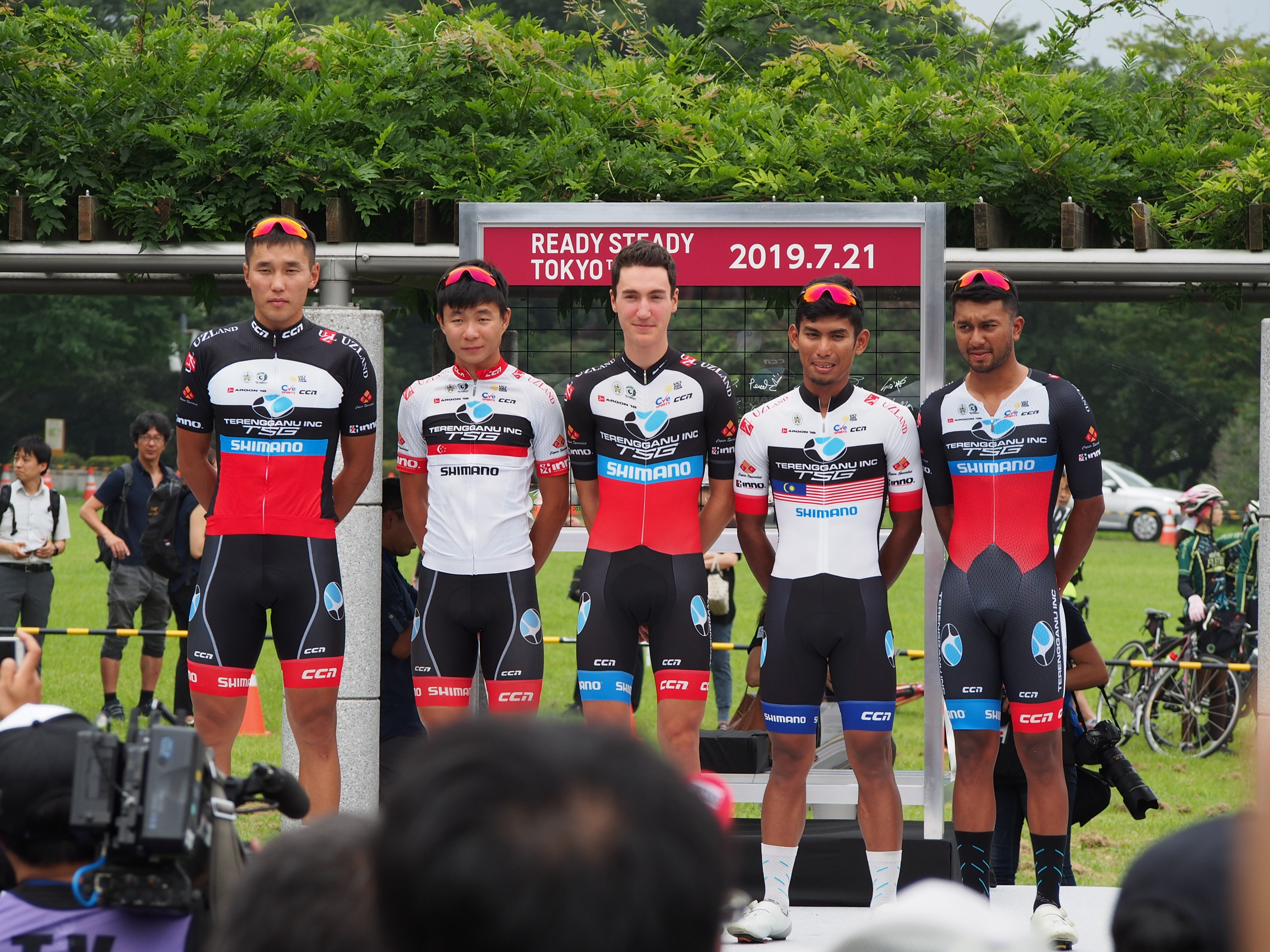
- The team in 2019

Team information
- UCI code: TSG
- Registered: Malaysia
- Founded: 2011
- Discipline: Road
- Status: UCI Continental Team

Key personnel
- General manager: Nasiruddin Wan Idrus
- Team managers: Jeremy Hunt; Muhammad Zamri; Mohd Saiful Anuar Aziz; Wan Mohd Nazri Wan Ahmad

Team name history
- 2011–2018 2019–2020 2021 2022–2023 2024–: Terengganu Cycling Team; Terengganu Inc. TSG Cycling Team; Terengganu Cycling Team; Terengganu Polygon Cycling Team; Terengganu Cycling Team

The Terengganu Cycling Team (UCI team code: TSG) is a Malaysian UCI Continental cycling team founded in 2011, and sponsored by PanGlobal Insurance, Science in Sport, Merpati, Castrol and Amerstrand Engineering.

== Team roster ==
As of 10 May 2026.

Rider	Date of birth
Muhammad Shahmir Aiman Abdul Halim (MAS)	24 April 2000 (age 26)
Pierre Barbier (FRA)	25 September 1997 (age 28)
Mathias Bregnhøj (DEN)	11 November 1995 (age 30)
Fergus Browning (AUS)	4 December 2003 (age 22)
Wan Abdul Rahman Hamdan (MAS)	19 June 1999 (age 27)
Zhe Yie Kee (MAS)	18 January 2003 (age 23)
Zeb Kyffin (GBR)	23 February 1998 (age 28)
James Gardner (NZL)	18 March 2005 (age 21)

Rider	Date of birth
Juan Pedro Lozano (ESP)	28 November 2003 (age 22)
Nur Amirul Fakhruddin Mazuki (MAS)	24 January 1992 (age 34)
Muhammad Qayyim Mohd Saipul Anuwai (MAS)	31 August 2004 (age 22)
Nur Aiman Mohd Zariff (MAS)	1 October 1997 (age 28)
Vadim Pronskiy (KAZ)	4 June 1998 (age 28)
Nur Aiman Rosli (MAS)	22 March 1999 (age 27)
Adne van Engelen (NED)	16 March 1993 (age 33)
Muhammad Haizam Mohd Shabri (MAS)	29 October 2002 (age 23)

== Major wins ==
2011
Stage 4 Jelajah Malaysia, Anuar Manan
Stage 5 Tour de Taiwan, Shinichi Fukushima
Stage 7b Tour de Singkarak, Jang Chan-jae
Malaysia Road Race Championships, Mohd Shahrul Mat Amin
Overall Tour de Brunei, Shinichi Fukushima

Stage 2, Anuar Manan
Stage 3, Harrif Saleh
Stage 4, Mohd Shahrul Mat Amin

Stage 7 Tour de Indonesia, Mohd Shahrul Mat Amin
Stages 8 & 10 Tour de Indonesia, Shinichi Fukushima
Stage 5 Tour of Hainan, Anuar Manan
2012
Malaysia Road Race Championships, Mohd Zamri Saleh
South Korea Road Race Championships, Jang Chan-jae
Stage 5 Tour of Thailand, Mohammad Saufi Mat Senan
Stage 3 Tour de Korea, Jang Chan-jae
Stages 1 & 6 Jelajah Malaysia, Shinichi Fukushima
Stage 3 Jelajah Malaysia, Mohd Shahrul Mat Amin
Stages 4 & 5 Jelajah Malaysia, Harrif Saleh
Stage 7 Tour de Singkarak, Mohd Zamri Saleh
Stage 4 Tour de East Java, Mohd Zamri Saleh
Stage 1 Tour de Brunei, Mohd Nor Umardi Rosdi
Stage 4 Tour de Brunei, Harrif Saleh
Stage 5 Tour de Brunei, Mohd Zamri Saleh
Stage 2 Tour of Hainan, Mohammad Saufi Mat Senan
Stage 5 Tour of Vietnam, Harrif Saleh
2013
Stage 3 Tour de Taiwan, Mohd Shahrul Mat Amin
Malaysia Road Race Championships, Mohd Shahrul Mat Amin
Stage 3 Jelajah Malaysia, Harrif Saleh
Stage 3 Tour of Borneo, Harrif Saleh
CFI International Race I, Nur Amirul Fakhruddin Mazuki
CFI International Race II, Anwar Azis Muhd Shaiful
CFI International Race III, Mohd Nor Umardi Rosdi
2014
Stage 4 Tour of Thailand, Maarten de Jonge
Uzbekistan Time Trial Championships, Muradjan Khalmuratov
Stage 4 Sharjah International Cycling Tour, Harrif Saleh
Stages 2 & 3 Jelajah Malaysia, Mohd Zamri Saleh
Stage 5 Jelajah Malaysia, Harrif Saleh
2015
Stage 3 Tour de Filipinas, Harrif Saleh
Malaysia Road Race Championships, Nur Amirul Fakhruddin Mazuki
South East Asian Games Road Race, Mohd Zamri Saleh
Stage 4 Tour of Borneo, Nur Amirul Fakhruddin Mazuki
Stages 3 & 5 Jelajah Malaysia, Anuar Manan
2016
U23 Asian Time Trial Championships, Maral-Erdene Batmunkh
Stages 3 & 4 Tour of Thailand, Harrif Saleh
Singapore Time Trial Championships, Goh Choon Huat
Malaysia Road Race Championships, Mohd Zamri Saleh
Malaysia Time Trial Championships, Mohd Nor Umardi Rosdi
Overall Tour de Flores, Daniel Whitehouse

Stage 2, Daniel Whitehouse

Mongolia Time Trial Championships, Maral-Erdene Batmunkh
Stage 8 Tour de Singkarak, Mohd Shahrul Mat Amin
2017
Stage 1 Tour de Filipinas, Daniel Whitehouse
Stage 2, Tour de Tochigi, Maral-Erdene Batmunkh
Stage 4 Tour de Lombok, Mohd Shahrul Mat Amin
Singapore Time Trial Championships, Goh Choon Huat
Singapore Road Race Championships, Goh Choon Huat
Mongolia Time Trial Championships, Maral-Erdene Batmunkh
Stage 1 Tour de Flores, Drew Morey
Stage 1 Jelajah Malaysia, Nur Amirul Fakhruddin Mazuki
Stage 2 Jelajah Malaysia, Adiq Husainie Othman
Stage 5 Jelajah Malaysia, Harrif Saleh
2018
Overall Tour de Langkawi, Artem Ovechkin

Stage 5, Artem Ovechkin

Stage 1 Tour de Lombok, Metkel Eyob
Stage 3 Sri Lanka T-Cup, Harrif Saleh
Stage 4 Tour de Filipinas, Metkel Eyob
Stage 4 (ITT) Tour of China II, Artem Ovechkin
2019
Stage 4 The Princess Maha Chakri Sirindhorn's Cup, Maral-Erdene Batmunkh
Stage 2 Tour de Langkawi, Harrif Saleh
Singapore Team Time Trial Championships, Goh Choon Huat
Russia Time Trial Championships, Artem Ovechkin
Oita Urban Classic, Drew Morey
Stage 4 Tour de Indonesia, Metkel Eyob
Prologue Tour of China II, Artem Ovechkin
Overall Tour de Siak, Nur Amirul Fakhruddin Mazuki

Points classification, Nur Amirul Fakhruddin Mazuki
Stage 1, Nur Amirul Fakhruddin Mazuki

Stage 1 Tour de Ijen, Maral-Erdene Batmunkh
Stage 2 Tour of Azerbaijan (Iran), Youcef Reguigui
Stage 3 Tour of Peninsular, Nur Amirul Fakhruddin Mazuki
2020
Stages 5 & 7 Tour de Langkawi, Harrif Saleh
Russia Time Trial Championships, Artem Ovechkin
Mongolia Time Trial Championships, Maral-Erdene Batmunkh
Panama Time Trial Championships, Christofer Jurado
Panama Road Race Championships, Christofer Jurado
2021
GP Manavgat, Mohd Hariff Saleh
Grand Prix Velo Alanya, Carlos Quintero
Grand Prix Gündoğmuş, Carlos Quintero
Kahramanmaraş Grand Prix Road Race, Jambaljamts Sainbayar
Overall Tour of Thailand, Jambaljamts Sainbayar
2022
Stage 6 Tour du Rwanda, Anatoliy Budyak
Grand Prix Mediterranean, Anatoliy Budyak
Grand Prix Gündoğmuş, Anatoliy Budyak
Stages 3 & 4 Tour of Thailand, Harrif Saleh
Stage 5 Tour de Taiwan, Harrif Saleh
2023
Overall Tour de Taiwan, Jeroen Meijers

Stage 4, Jeroen Meijers

Stages 3, 9 & 10 Tour d'Algérie, Youcef Reguigui
Grand Prix International de la ville d'Alger Youcef Reguigui
2nd Overall Tour of Huangshan, Sainbayaryn Jambaljamts

1st Stage 2

2024
Overall Tour de Banyuwangi Ijen, Merhawi Kudus

Stage 2, Merhawi Kudus

Stage 2 Tour of Thailand, Nur Aiman Rosli
Stages 2 & 4 Tour d'Algérie, Youcef Reguigui
2025
Overall Tour of Salalah, Adne van Engelen

Stage 2, Adne van Engelen

Overall Tour of Route Salvation, Mathias Bregnhøj

Stages 1 & 2, Mathias Bregnhøj
Stage 3, Wan Abdul Rahman Hamdan

Overall Tour of Mersin, Stefan de Bod

Stage 3, Stefan de Bod

Grand Prix Syedra Ancient City, Stefan de Bod
Grand Prix Antalya, Wan Abdul Rahman Hamdan
2026
Prologue (ITT) Pune Grand Tour, Fergus Browning
Grand Prix Alaiye, Pierre Barbier
Grand Prix Pedalia, Adne van Engelen
Overall Tour of Thailand, Vadim Pronskiy

Stages 1 & 2, Pierre Barbier
Stage 3, Vadim Pronskiy

Stage 1 Grand Prix Fergana, Juan Pedro Lozano
Classique of Mauritius, Nur Aiman Zariff

== Continental & national champions ==
2011
Malaysia Road Race, Mohamed Mat Amin
2012
Malaysia Road Race, Mohamed Zamri Salleh
South Korea Road Race, Jang Chan-Jae
2013
Malaysia Road Race, Mohd Shahrul Mat Amin
2014
Uzbekistan Time Trial, Muradjan Halmuratov
2015
Malaysia Road Race, Nur Amirul Fakhruddin Marzuki
2016
Singapore Time Trial, Choon Huat Goh
Malaysia Road Race, Mohd Zamri Saleh
Malaysia Time Trial, Mohd Nor Umardi Rosdi
Mongolia Time Trial, Maral-erdene Batmunkh
2017
Singapore Time Trial, Choon Huat Goh
Singapore Road Race, Choon Huat Goh
Mongolia Time Trial, Maral-erdene Batmunkh
2018
African Team Time Trial, Metkel Eyob
Singapore Time Trial, Choon Huat Goh
Singapore Road Race, Choon Huat Goh
Mongolia Time Trial, Maral-erdene Batmunkh
2019
Singapore Team Time Trial, Choon Huat Goh
Singapore Time Trial, Choon Huat Goh
Russia Time Trial, Artem Ovechkin
Algeria Time Trial, Youcef Reguigui
Singapore Road Race, Choon Huat Goh
Malaysia Road Race, Nur Amirul Fakhruddin Marzuki
Africa Continental Time Trial, Youcef Reguigui
2020
Russia Time Trial, Artem Ovechkin
Mongolia Road Race, Maral-erdene Batmunkh
Panama Time Trial, Cristofer Jurado López
Panama Road Race, Cristofer Jurado López
2022
Mongolia Time Trial, Jambaljamts Sainbayar
Singapore Time Trial, Choon Huat Goh
2023
Algeria Time Trial, Youcef Reguigui
Indonesia Time Trial, Aiman Cahyadi
Malaysia Road Race, Nur Aiman Mohd Zariff
Mongolia Road Race, Jambaljamts Sainbayar
2024
Cyprus Road Race, Andreas Miltiadis
Malaysia Road Race, Nur Amirul Fakhruddin Mazuki
Cyprus Time Trial, Andreas Miltiadis
Indonesia Time Trial, Aiman Cahyadi
Malaysia Time Trial, Nur Aiman Rosli
2025
Malaysia Road Race, Nur Aiman Rosli
Malaysia Time Trial, Nur Aiman Rosli
Ukraine Time Trial, Anatoliy Budyak
