= CFI International Race =

Cycle race series in India

Race details
- Date: December
- Region: India
- Discipline: Road
- Type: Three one-day races

History
- First edition: 2013
- Editions: 1 (as of 2013)

CFI International Race are a series of three men's one-day cycle race events that take place in India. Each race was rated 1.2 by the UCI and forms part of the UCI Asia Tour. The first race took place in Mumbai, the second in Jaipur, and the third in Delhi.

== Overall winners - Race 1 ==
Year	Winner	Team
2013	(Malaysia) Nur Amiraul Fakhruddin Mazuki	Terengganu Cycling Team

== Overall winners - Race 2 ==
Year	Winner	Team
2013	(Malaysia) Mohamed Saiful Anuar Aziz	Terengganu Cycling Team

== Overall winners - Race 3 ==
Year	Winner	Team
2013	(Malaysia) Mohd Nor Umardi Rosdi	Terengganu Cycling Team
