= Takeaki Ayabe =

Japanese bicycle racer (born 1980)

Personal information
- Born: 5 September 1980 (age 46) Kanagawa, Japan

Cycling career
- Sport: Cycling
- Discipline: Road
- Role: Rider

Professional teams
- 2005: Miyata–Subaru
- 2006–2016: Aisan Racing Team

Takeaki Ayabe (Japanese: 綾部勇成, born 5 September 1980 in Kanagawa) is a Japanese racing cyclist, who last rode for the Aisan Racing Team.

== Major results ==
2007
9th Overall Tour of Hong Kong Shanghai
2009
8th Overall Tour de East Java
8th Overall Tour de Hokkaido
2010
4th Overall Tour de Hokkaido
8th Overall Tour de Taiwan
2011
1st Stage 4 Tour de Langkawi
7th Overall Tour de Singkarak
