= Boris Shpilevsky =

Russian road bicycle racer

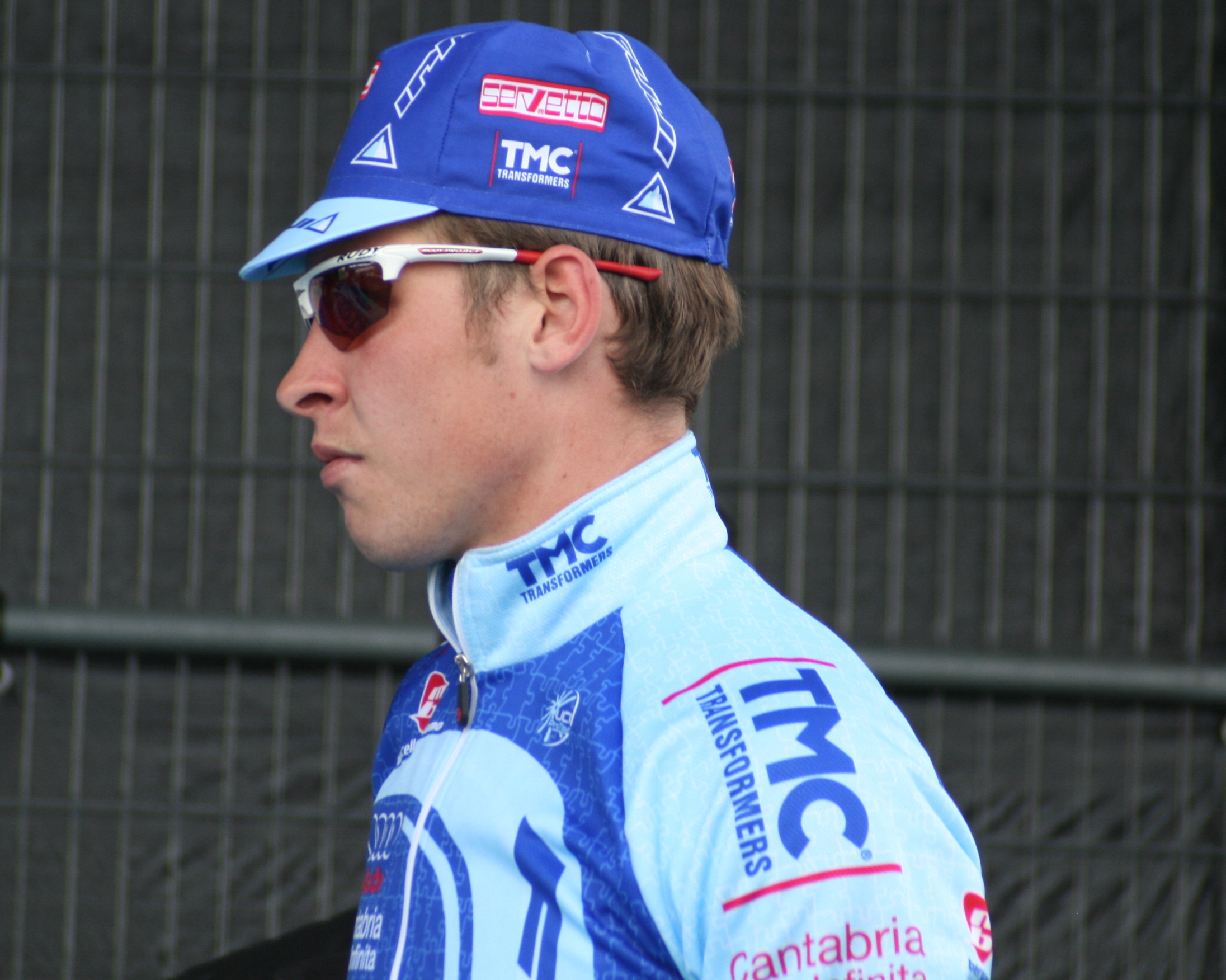
- Shpilevsky in 2009

Personal information
- Full name: Boris Shpilevsky; Russian: Борис Шпилевский
- Born: 20 August 1982 (age 44) Moscow, Soviet Union

Cycling career
- Sport: Cycling
- Current team: Retired
- Discipline: Road
- Role: Rider
- Rider type: Sprinter

Amateur team
- 2010: CC Cambrai

Professional teams
- 2007–2008: Kio Ene–Tonazzi–DMT
- 2009: Fuji–Servetto
- 2010: Katyusha Continental Team
- 2011: Tabriz Petrochemical Team
- 2012: Ag2r–La Mondiale
- 2013: Lokosphinx
- 2013–2015: RTS–Santic Racing Team

Major wins
- Firenze–Pistoia (2007); Flèche du Sud (2007); Giro del Friuli Venezia Giulia (2006)

Boris Shpilevsky (Russian: Борис Шпилевский; born 20 August 1982) is a Russian former professional road bicycle racer, who rode professionally between 2007 and 2015. He previously rode for UCI ProTeams Fuji–Servetto in 2009 and Ag2r–La Mondiale in 2012.

== Major results ==
2001
9th Chrono Champenois
2003
Grand Prix Guillaume Tell

1st Stages 4a & 5

1st Stage 1 Triptyque des Barrages U23
2006
1st Overall Giro del Friuli-Venezia Giulia

1st Stage 1b

1st San Bernardino di Lugo
1st Montecatini Terme
8th Coppa della Pace
10th Overall Giro di Toscana
2007
1st Overall Flèche du Sud

1st Stages 2 & 4

1st Clasica Internacional Txuma
1st Firenze–Pistoia
3rd Giro di Toscana
7th Memorial Cimurri
10th Overall Istrian Spring Trophy
10th Giro della Romagna
2008
1st Overall Tour of Hainan

1st Stages 1, 2, 4, 6, 7 & 9

1st Stage 2 Tour of Belgium
10th Firenze–Pistoia
2009
Tour of Hainan

1st Stages 2, 6, 8 & 9

2010
Tour of Qinghai Lake

1st Stages 7 & 8

Tour du Maroc

1st Stages 5, 8 & 10

Five Rings of Moscow

1st Stages 3 & 5

2011
1st Overall Tour of Taihu Lake

1st Points classification
1st Stages 1 & 5

Tour of China

1st Stages 4, 5, 6 & 7

1st Stage 9 Tour de Langkawi
1st Stage 1 Tour de East Java
2013
1st Stage 1 Tour of Fuzhou
3rd Overall Tour of Taihu Lake
7th Tour of Nanjing
2014
1st Overall Tour of China II

1st Points classification
1st Stages 2 & 5

Tour of China I

1st Points classification
1st Stage 7

1st Stage 1 Tour of Fuzhou
4th Overall Tour of Taihu Lake

1st Stages 5 & 9

2015
3rd Overall Tour of China II
