= Tour of Vietnam =

Race details
- Date: December
- Region: Vietnam
- Discipline: Road
- Competition: UCI Asia Tour
- Type: Stage race

History
- First edition: 2012
- Editions: 1
- Final edition: 2012
- First winner: En Huang (CHN)
- Most wins: No repeat winners
- Final winner: En Huang (CHN)

The Tour of Vietnam was a multi-day road cycling race that was only held once, in 2012. It was part of UCI Asia Tour in category 2.2.

== Winners ==
Year	Country	Rider	Team
2012	China	Huang En	
