= Tour de Brunei =

Race details
- Date: September
- Region: Brunei
- Discipline: Road
- Type: Stage race
- Web site: www.tourdebrunei.com

History
- First edition: 2011

Tour de Brunei is a men's stage race cycle race which takes place in Brunei and was rated by the UCI as 2.2 and forms part of the UCI Asia Tour. The cycling event has been held in 2011 and 2012, but was cancelled each year since 2013.

== Overall winners ==
Year	Winner	Second	Third
2011	Shinichi Fukushima (JPN)	Adiq Husainie Othman (MAS)	Hossein Jahanbanian (IRI)
2012	Hossein Alizadeh (IRI)	Duc Tam Trinh (VIE)	Harrif Salleh (MAS)
