= Melaka Governor's Cup =

Melaka Governor Cup
Race details
- Date: April
- Region: Peninsular Malaysia
- English name: Malacca Governor Cup
- Local name(s): Jelajah Piala Gabenor Melaka (in Malay)
- Discipline: Road
- Competition: UCI Asia Tour 1.2
- Type: Classic one-day race
- Organiser: Malaysian National Cycling Federation

History
- First edition: 2007
- Editions: 6
- Final edition: 2014
- First winner: Mohd Rauf Nur Misbah (MAS)
- Most wins: No repeat winners
- Final winner: Alexandre Pliușchin (MDA)

The Melaka Governor Cup was an annual professional road bicycle racing classic one-day race held in Malaysia from 2007 to 2014, named after Governor of Malacca. The race previously known as Melaka Chief Minister Cup and His Excellency Governor of Malacca Cup. The race was part of the UCI Asia Tour and was classified by the International Cycling Union (UCI) as 1.2 a category event. The 2014 edition of the race was won by Alexandre Pliușchin of Moldova.

== Past winners ==
Year	Country	Rider	Team
2007	Malaysia	Mohd Rauf Nur Misbah	
2008	Iran	Mehdi Sohrabi	Iran national team
2009	No race		
2010	Ireland	David McCann	Giant Asia Racing Team
2011	Iran	Hassan Maleki	Suren Cycling Team
2012	No race		
2013	Netherlands	Lex Nederlof	CCN Cycling Team
2014	Moldova	Alexandre Pliușchin	Skydive Dubai Pro Cycling
