= 2022 Cofidis (men's team) season =

Cofidis
- 2022 season
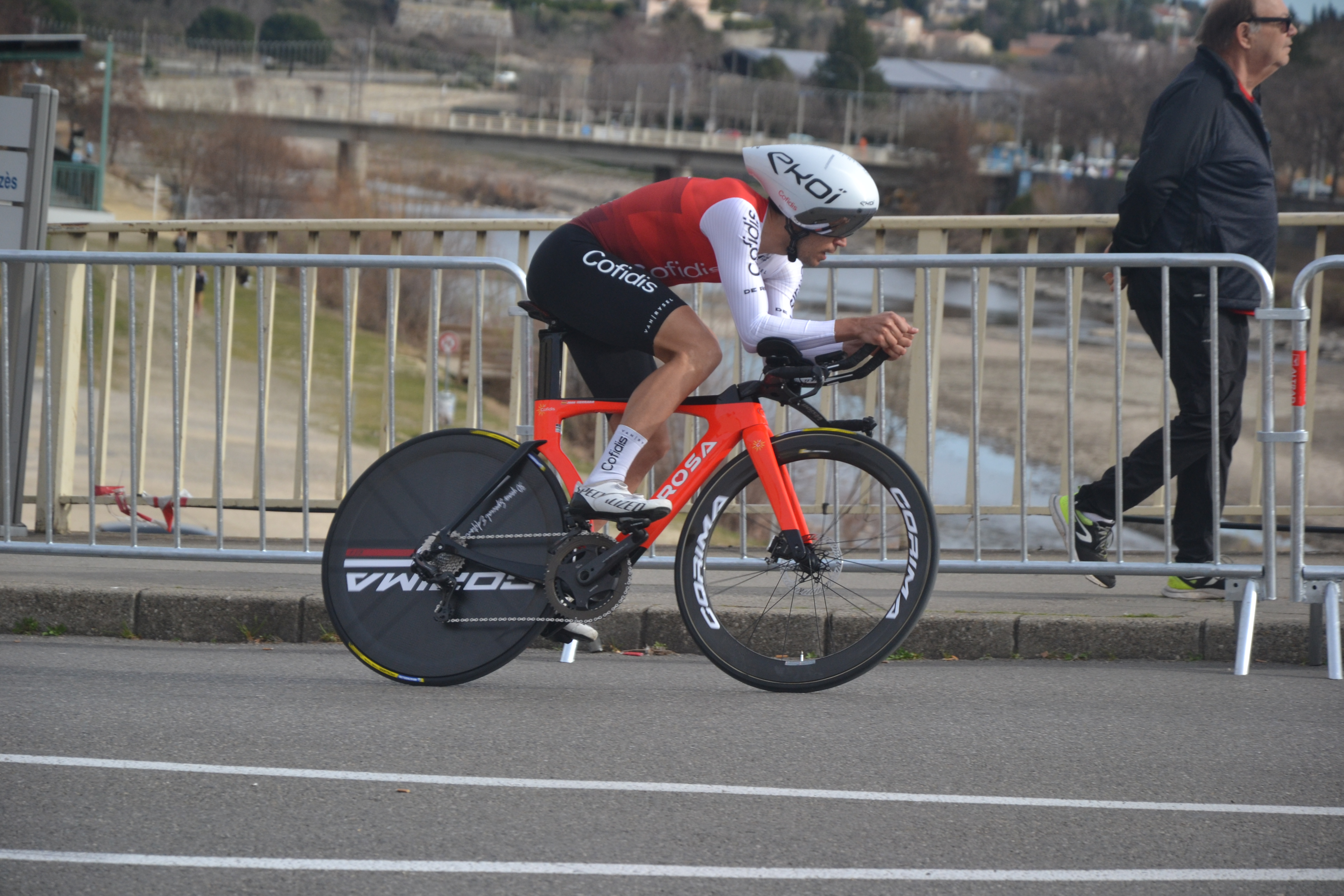
- José Herrada on Étoile de Bessèges
- UCI code: COF
- Status: UCI WorldTeam
- Manager: Yvon Sanquer (FRA)
- Main sponsor(s): Cofidis
- Based: France
- Bicycles: De Rosa
- Groupset: Campagnolo

Season victories
- One-day races: 4
- Stage race overall: 2
- Stage race stages: 4
- Jersey

The 2022 season for the Cofidis road cycling team is its 26th season overall and the third consecutive year as a UCI WorldTeam. They use De Rosa bicycles, Campagnolo drivetrain, Corima wheels and Nalini clothing.

== Team roster ==
As of 29 January 2022.

Rider	Date of birth
Piet Allegaert (BEL)	20 January 1995 (aged 26)
Sander Armée (BEL)	10 December 1985 (aged 36)
François Bidard (FRA)	12 March 1992 (aged 29)
Tom Bohli (SUI)	17 January 1994 (aged 27)
André Carvalho (POR)	31 October 1997 (aged 24)
Thomas Champion (FRA)	8 September 1999 (aged 22)
Davide Cimolai (ITA)	13 August 1989 (aged 32)
Simone Consonni (ITA)	12 September 1994 (aged 27)
Bryan Coquard (FRA)	25 April 1992 (aged 29)
Alexandre Delettre (FRA)	25 October 1997 (aged 24)
Rubén Fernández (ESP)	1 March 1991 (aged 30)
Eddy Finé (FRA)	20 November 1997 (aged 24)
Simon Geschke (GER)	13 March 1986 (aged 35)
Jesús Herrada (ESP)	26 July 1990 (aged 31)
José Herrada (ESP)	1 October 1985 (aged 36)
Ion Izagirre (ESP)	4 February 1989 (aged 32)

Rider	Date of birth
Wesley Kreder (NED)	4 November 1990 (aged 31)
Victor Lafay (FRA)	17 January 1996 (aged 25)
Guillaume Martin (FRA)	9 June 1993 (aged 28)
Anthony Perez (FRA)	22 April 1991 (aged 30)
Pierre-Luc Périchon (FRA)	4 January 1987 (aged 34)
Alexis Renard (FRA)	1 June 1999 (aged 22)
Rémy Rochas (FRA)	18 May 1996 (aged 25)
Szymon Sajnok (POL)	24 August 1997 (aged 24)
Benjamin Thomas (FRA)	12 September 1995 (aged 26)
Hugo Toumire (FRA)	5 October 2001 (aged 20)
Kenneth Vanbilsen (BEL)	1 June 1990 (aged 31)
Davide Villella (ITA)	27 June 1991 (aged 30)
Jelle Wallays (BEL)	11 May 1989 (aged 32)
Max Walscheid (GER)	13 June 1993 (aged 28)
Axel Zingle (FRA)	18 December 1998 (aged 23)

Riders who joined the team for the 2022 season

Rider	2021 team
Sander Armée	Team Qhubeka NextHash
François Bidard	AG2R Citroën Team
Davide Cimolai	Israel Start-Up Nation
Bryan Coquard	B&B Hotels p/b KTM
Alexandre Delettre	Delko
Ion Izagirre	Astana–Premier Tech
Wesley Kreder	Intermarché–Wanty–Gobert Matériaux
Alexis Renard	Israel Start-Up Nation
Benjamin Thomas	Groupama–FDJ
Hugo Toumire	neo-pro (VC Rouen 76)
Davide Villella	Movistar Team
Max Walscheid	Team Qhubeka NextHash
Axel Zingle	neo-pro (CC Étupes)

Riders who left the team during or after the 2021 season

Rider	2022 team
Fernando Barceló	Caja Rural–Seguros RGA
Natnael Berhane	AlShafar Jumeirah
Jempy Drucker	Retired
Nicolas Edet	Arkéa–Samsic
Nathan Haas	Gravel racing
Christophe Laporte	Team Jumbo–Visma
Emmanuel Morin	Team UC Nantes Atlantique
Fabio Sabatini	Retired
Attilio Viviani	Bingoal Pauwels Sauces WB
Elia Viviani	INEOS Grenadiers

== Season victories ==
Date	Race	Competition	Rider	Country	Location	Ref.
3 February	Étoile de Bessèges, Stage 2	UCI Europe Tour	Bryan Coquard (FRA)	France	Rousson	
4 February	Étoile de Bessèges, Stage 3	UCI Europe Tour	Benjamin Thomas (FRA)	France	Bessèges	
6 February	Étoile de Bessèges, Overall	UCI Europe Tour	Benjamin Thomas (FRA)	France		
12 February	Tour de la Provence, Stage 2	UCI ProSeries	Bryan Coquard (FRA)	France	Manosque	
17 March	Grand Prix de Denain	UCI ProSeries	Max Walscheid (GER)	France	Denain	
19 March	Classic Loire Atlantique	UCI Europe Tour	Anthony Perez (FRA)	France	La Haye-Fouassière	
2 April	Route Adélie	UCI Europe Tour	Axel Zingle (FRA)	France	Vitré	
15 April	Classic Grand Besançon Doubs	UCI Europe Tour	Jesús Herrada (ESP)	France	Montfaucon	
27 May	Boucles de la Mayenne, Stage 2	UCI ProSeries	Benjamin Thomas (FRA)	France	Pré-en-Pail-Saint-Samson	
29 May	Boucles de la Mayenne, Overall	UCI ProSeries	Benjamin Thomas (FRA)	France		

== National, Continental, and World Champions ==
Date	Discipline	Jersey	Rider	Country	Location	Ref.
