= 2022 Boucles de la Mayenne =

2022 UCI ProSeries

Race details
- Dates: 26–29 May 2022
- Stages: 4
- Distance: 719 km (446.8 mi)

Results
Jersey awarded to the overall winner	Winner	Benjamin Thomas (FRA)	(Cofidis)
	Second	Benoît Cosnefroy (FRA)	(AG2R Citroën Team)
	Third	Alex Aranburu (ESP)	(Movistar Team)
Jersey awarded to the points classification winner	Points	Orluis Aular (VEN)	(Caja Rural–Seguros RGA)
Jersey awarded to the mountains classification winner	Mountains	Gilles De Wilde (BEL)	(Sport Vlaanderen–Baloise)
Jersey awarded to the youth classification winner	Youth	Jake Stewart (GBR)	(Groupama–FDJ)
	Team	Team TotalEnergies	

The 2022 Boucles de la Mayenne (transl. Loops of the Mayenne) is the 47th edition of the Boucles de la Mayenne road cycling stage race, which took place between 26 and 29 May 2022 in the Mayenne department in northwestern France.

== Teams ==
Five UCI WorldTeams, twelve UCI ProTeams, and five UCI Continental teams made up the twenty-two teams that participated in the race.

UCI WorldTeams

- AG2R Citroën Team
- Cofidis
- Groupama–FDJ
- Movistar Team
- UAE Team Emirates

UCI ProTeams

- Arkéa–Samsic
- Bingoal Pauwels Sauces WB
- Burgos BH
- B&B Hotels–KTM
- Caja Rural–Seguros RGA
- Drone Hopper–Androni Giocattoli
- Equipo Kern Pharma
- Euskaltel–Euskadi
- Human Powered Health
- Sport Vlaanderen–Baloise
- Team TotalEnergies
- Uno-X Pro Cycling Team

UCI Continental Teams

- Go Sport–Roubaix–Lille Métropole
- Nice Métropole Côte d'Azur
- St. Michel–Auber93
- Team Lotto–Kern Haus
- Team UC Nantes Atlantique

== Route ==
Stage characteristics and winners
Stage	Date	Course	Distance	Type	Stage winner
1	26 May	Saint-Pierre-des-Landes to Andouillé	180 km (110 mi)	Hilly stage	Jason Tesson (FRA)
2	27 May	Jublains to Pré-en-Pail-Saint-Samson	171 km (106 mi)	Hilly stage	Benjamin Thomas (FRA)
3	28 May	Saint-Berthevin to Château-Gontier-sur-Mayenne	188 km (117 mi)	Hilly stage	Amaury Capiot (BEL)
4	29 May	Martigné-sur-Mayenne to Laval	180 km (110 mi)	Hilly stage	Juan Sebastián Molano (COL)
Total			719 km (447 mi)		

== Stages ==
=== Stage 1 ===
26 May 2022 – Saint-Pierre-des-Landes to Andouillé, 180 km (110 mi)

Stage 1 Result
Rank	Rider	Team	Time
1	Jason Tesson (FRA)	St. Michel–Auber93	4h 12' 05"
2	Bram Welten (NED)	Groupama–FDJ	+ 0"
3	Thomas Boudat (FRA)	Go Sport–Roubaix–Lille Métropole	+ 0"
4	Jérémy Lecroq (FRA)	B&B Hotels–KTM	+ 0"
5	Anthony Turgis (FRA)	Team TotalEnergies	+ 0"
6	Julien Simon (FRA)	Team TotalEnergies	+ 0"
7	Alex Aranburu (ESP)	Movistar Team	+ 0"
8	Orluis Aular (VEN)	Caja Rural–Seguros RGA	+ 0"
9	Lorrenzo Manzin (FRA)	Team TotalEnergies	+ 0"
10	Amaury Capiot (BEL)	Arkéa–Samsic	+ 0"

General classification after Stage 1
Rank	Rider	Team	Time
1	Jason Tesson (FRA)	St. Michel–Auber93	4h 11' 55"
2	Bram Welten (NED)	Groupama–FDJ	+ 4"
3	Lindsay De Vylder (BEL)	Sport Vlaanderen–Baloise	+ 4"
4	Thomas Boudat (FRA)	Go Sport–Roubaix–Lille Métropole	+ 6"
5	Ángel Madrazo (ESP)	Burgos BH	+ 6"
6	Joey Rosskopf (USA)	Human Powered Health	+ 8"
7	Jérémy Lecroq (FRA)	B&B Hotels–KTM	+ 10"
8	Anthony Turgis (FRA)	Team TotalEnergies	+ 10"
9	Julien Simon (FRA)	Team TotalEnergies	+ 10"
10	Alex Aranburu (ESP)	Movistar Team	+ 10"

=== Stage 2 ===
27 May 2022 – Jublains to Pré-en-Pail-Saint-Samson, 171 km (106 mi)

Stage 2 Result
Rank	Rider	Team	Time
1	Benjamin Thomas (FRA)	Cofidis	4h 11' 30"
2	Benoît Cosnefroy (FRA)	AG2R Citroën Team	+ 0"
3	Alex Aranburu (ESP)	Movistar Team	+ 0"
4	Finn Fisher-Black (NZL)	UAE Team Emirates	+ 0"
5	Julien Simon (FRA)	Team TotalEnergies	+ 0"
6	Marco Tizza (ITA)	Bingoal Pauwels Sauces WB	+ 0"
7	Romain Hardy (FRA)	Arkéa–Samsic	+ 4"
8	Jake Stewart (GBR)	Groupama–FDJ	+ 4"
9	Idar Andersen (NOR)	Uno-X Pro Cycling Team	+ 6"
10	Thibault Ferasse (FRA)	B&B Hotels–KTM	+ 13"

General classification after Stage 2
Rank	Rider	Team	Time
1	Benjamin Thomas (FRA)	Cofidis	8h 23' 25"
2	Benoît Cosnefroy (FRA)	AG2R Citroën Team	+ 4"
3	Alex Aranburu (ESP)	Movistar Team	+ 6"
4	Julien Simon (FRA)	Team TotalEnergies	+ 10"
5	Finn Fisher-Black (NZL)	UAE Team Emirates	+ 10"
6	Marco Tizza (ITA)	Bingoal Pauwels Sauces WB	+ 10"
7	Jake Stewart (GBR)	Groupama–FDJ	+ 14"
8	Romain Hardy (FRA)	Arkéa–Samsic	+ 14"
9	Idar Andersen (NOR)	Uno-X Pro Cycling Team	+ 16"
10	Anthony Turgis (FRA)	Team TotalEnergies	+ 23"

=== Stage 3 ===
28 May 2022 – Saint-Berthevin to Château-Gontier-sur-Mayenne, 188 km (117 mi)

Stage 3 Result
Rank	Rider	Team	Time
1	Amaury Capiot (BEL)	Arkéa–Samsic	4h 06' 48"
2	Kristoffer Halvorsen (NOR)	Uno-X Pro Cycling Team	+ 0"
3	Juan José Lobato (ESP)	Euskaltel–Euskadi	+ 0"
4	Orluis Aular (VEN)	Caja Rural–Seguros RGA	+ 0"
5	Emmanuel Morin (FRA)	Team UC Nantes Atlantique	+ 0"
6	Bram Welten (NED)	Groupama–FDJ	+ 0"
7	Antonio Angulo (ESP)	Euskaltel–Euskadi	+ 0"
8	Jason Tesson (FRA)	St. Michel–Auber93	+ 0"
9	Juan Sebastián Molano (COL)	UAE Team Emirates	+ 0"
10	Thomas Boudat (FRA)	Go Sport–Roubaix–Lille Métropole	+ 0"

General classification after Stage 3
Rank	Rider	Team	Time
1	Benjamin Thomas (FRA)	Cofidis	12h 30' 13"
2	Benoît Cosnefroy (FRA)	AG2R Citroën Team	+ 3"
3	Alex Aranburu (ESP)	Movistar Team	+ 6"
4	Julien Simon (FRA)	Team TotalEnergies	+ 10"
5	Marco Tizza (ITA)	Bingoal Pauwels Sauces WB	+ 10"
6	Finn Fisher-Black (NZL)	UAE Team Emirates	+ 10"
7	Jake Stewart (GBR)	Groupama–FDJ	+ 12"
8	Romain Hardy (FRA)	Arkéa–Samsic	+ 14"
9	Idar Andersen (NOR)	Uno-X Pro Cycling Team	+ 16"
10	Anthony Turgis (FRA)	Team TotalEnergies	+ 20"

=== Stage 4 ===
29 May 2022 – Martigné-sur-Mayenne to Laval, 180 km (110 mi)

Stage 4 Result
Rank	Rider	Team	Time
1	Juan Sebastián Molano (COL)	UAE Team Emirates	4h 10' 09"
2	Orluis Aular (VEN)	Caja Rural–Seguros RGA	+ 0"
3	Bryan Coquard (FRA)	Cofidis	+ 0"
4	Jérémy Lecroq (FRA)	B&B Hotels–KTM	+ 0"
5	Lorrenzo Manzin (FRA)	Team TotalEnergies	+ 0"
6	Amaury Capiot (BEL)	Arkéa–Samsic	+ 0"
7	Bram Welten (NED)	Groupama–FDJ	+ 0"
8	Julien Simon (FRA)	Team TotalEnergies	+ 0"
9	Stanisław Aniołkowski (POL)	Bingoal Pauwels Sauces WB	+ 0"
10	Edvald Boasson Hagen (NOR)	Team TotalEnergies	+ 0"

General classification after Stage 4
Rank	Rider	Team	Time
1	Benjamin Thomas (FRA)	Cofidis	16h 40' 22"
2	Benoît Cosnefroy (FRA)	AG2R Citroën Team	+ 3"
3	Alex Aranburu (ESP)	Movistar Team	+ 6"
4	Julien Simon (FRA)	Team TotalEnergies	+ 10"
5	Marco Tizza (ITA)	Bingoal Pauwels Sauces WB	+ 10"
6	Jake Stewart (GBR)	Groupama–FDJ	+ 12"
7	Romain Hardy (FRA)	Arkéa–Samsic	+ 14"
8	Idar Andersen (NOR)	Uno-X Pro Cycling Team	+ 16"
9	Louis Barré (FRA)	Team UC Nantes Atlantique	+ 19"
10	Anthony Turgis (FRA)	Team TotalEnergies	+ 20"

== Classification leadership table ==
Classification leadership by stage
Stage	Winner	General classification	Points classification	Mountains classification	Young rider classification	Team classification
1	Jason Tesson	Jason Tesson	Jason Tesson	Lindsay De Vylder	Jason Tesson	Team TotalEnergies
2	Benjamin Thomas	Benjamin Thomas	Benjamin Thomas	Gilles De Wilde	Finn Fisher-Black	Team TotalEnergies
3	Amaury Capiot	Benjamin Thomas	Jason Tesson	Gilles De Wilde	Finn Fisher-Black	Team TotalEnergies
4	Juan Sebastián Molano	Benjamin Thomas	Orluis Aular	Gilles De Wilde	Jake Stewart	Team TotalEnergies
Final		Benjamin Thomas	Orluis Aular	Gilles De Wilde	Jake Stewart	Team TotalEnergies

- On stage 2, Bram Welten, who was second in the points classification, wore the green jersey, because first placed Jason Tesson wore the yellow jersey as leader of the general classification. For the same reason, Milan Fretin who was second in the young rider classification, wore the white jersey.
- On stage 3, Jason Tesson, who was second in the points classification, wore the green jersey, because first placed Benjamin Thomas wore the yellow jersey as leader of the general classification.

== Final classification standings ==
Legend
Denotes the winner of the general classification	Denotes the winner of the mountains classification
Denotes the winner of the points classification	Denotes the winner of the young rider classification

=== General classification ===
Final general classification (1–10)
Rank	Rider	Team	Time
1	Benjamin Thomas (FRA)	Cofidis	16h 40' 22"
2	Benoît Cosnefroy (FRA)	AG2R Citroën Team	+ 3"
3	Alex Aranburu (ESP)	Movistar Team	+ 6"
4	Julien Simon (FRA)	Team TotalEnergies	+ 10"
5	Marco Tizza (ITA)	Bingoal Pauwels Sauces WB	+ 10"
6	Jake Stewart (GBR)	Groupama–FDJ	+ 12"
7	Romain Hardy (FRA)	Arkéa–Samsic	+ 14"
8	Idar Andersen (NOR)	Uno-X Pro Cycling Team	+ 16"
9	Louis Barré (FRA)	Team UC Nantes Atlantique	+ 19"
10	Anthony Turgis (FRA)	Team TotalEnergies	+ 20"

=== Points classification ===
Final points classification (1–10)
Rank	Rider	Team	Points
1	Orluis Aular (VEN)	Caja Rural–Seguros RGA	42
2	Amaury Capiot (BEL)	Arkéa–Samsic	41
3	Bram Welten (NED)	Groupama–FDJ	39
4	Jason Tesson (FRA)	St. Michel–Auber93	33
5	Juan Sebastián Molano (COL)	UAE Team Emirates	32
6	Julien Simon (FRA)	Team TotalEnergies	32
7	Alex Aranburu (ESP)	Movistar Team	31
8	Jérémy Lecroq (FRA)	B&B Hotels–KTM	28
9	Thomas Boudat (FRA)	Go Sport–Roubaix–Lille Métropole	27
10	Benjamin Thomas (FRA)	Cofidis	25

=== Mountains classification ===
Final mountains classification (1–10)
Rank	Rider	Team	Points
1	Gilles De Wilde (BEL)	Sport Vlaanderen–Baloise	74
2	Paul Hennequin (FRA)	Nice Métropole Côte d'Azur	46
3	Lindsay De Vylder (BEL)	Sport Vlaanderen–Baloise	19
4	Joey Rosskopf (USA)	Human Powered Health	18
5	Damien Touzé (FRA)	AG2R Citroën Team	14
6	Louis Barré (FRA)	Team UC Nantes Atlantique	10
7	Romain Cardis (FRA)	St. Michel–Auber93	10
8	Dimitri Peyskens (BEL)	Bingoal Pauwels Sauces WB	8
9	Greg Van Avermaet (BEL)	AG2R Citroën Team	6
10	Mathieu Burgaudeau (FRA)	Team TotalEnergies	6

=== Young rider classification ===
Final young rider classification (1–10)
Rank	Rider	Team	Time
1	Jake Stewart (GBR)	Groupama–FDJ	16h 40' 34"
2	Idar Andersen (NOR)	Uno-X Pro Cycling Team	+ 4"
3	Louis Barré (FRA)	Team UC Nantes Atlantique	+ 7"
4	Mathieu Burgaudeau (FRA)	Team TotalEnergies	+ 11"
5	Lewis Askey (GBR)	Groupama–FDJ	+ 11"
6	Axel Mariault (FRA)	Team UC Nantes Atlantique	+ 11"
7	Ward Vanhoof (BEL)	Sport Vlaanderen–Baloise	+ 41"
8	Paul Penhoët (FRA)	Groupama–FDJ	+ 41"
9	Jon Barrenetxea (ESP)	Caja Rural–Seguros RGA	+ 41"
10	Josu Etxeberria (ESP)	Caja Rural–Seguros RGA	+ 41"

=== Team classification ===
Final team classification (1–10)
Rank	Team	Time
1	Team TotalEnergies	50h 02' 02"
2	Groupama–FDJ	+ 4"
3	AG2R Citroën Team	+ 30"
4	Cofidis	+ 46"
5	Arkéa–Samsic	+ 58"
6	St. Michel–Auber93	+ 1' 13"
7	Burgos BH	+ 1' 13"
8	Movistar Team	+ 1' 40"
9	Bingoal Pauwels Sauces WB	+ 1' 40"
10	Sport Vlaanderen–Baloise	+ 1' 53"
