= 2022 Vuelta a Burgos =

Men's road cycling stage race

2022 UCI ProSeries

Race details
- Dates: 2 – 6 August 2022
- Stages: 5
- Distance: 810 km (503.3 mi)

The 2022 Vuelta a Burgos was a men's road cycling stage race that took place from 2 to 6 August 2022 in the Spanish province of Burgos. It was the 44th edition of the Vuelta a Burgos, and was rated as a 2.Pro event as part of the 2022 UCI ProSeries calendar.

== Teams ==
Twelve of the eighteen UCI WorldTeams were joined by five UCI ProTeams to make up the seventeen teams that participated in the race.

UCI WorldTeams

- AG2R Citroën Team
- Astana Qazaqstan Team
- Team Bahrain Victorious
- Bora–Hansgrohe
- EF Education–EasyPost
- Ineos Grenadiers
- Israel–Premier Tech
- Team Jumbo–Visma
- Movistar Team
- Quick-Step Alpha Vinyl Team
- Trek–Segafredo
- UAE Team Emirates

UCI ProTeams

- Burgos BH
- Caja Rural–Seguros RGA
- Euskaltel–Euskadi
- Eolo–Kometa
- Equipo Kern Pharma

== Route ==
Stage characteristics and winners
Stage	Date	Course	Distance	Type	Stage winner
1	2 August	Burgos (Catedral) to Burgos (El Castillo)	157 km (98 mi)	Hilly stage	Santiago Buitrago (COL)
2	3 August	Vivar del Cid to Villadiego	158 km (98 mi)	Hilly stage	Timo Roosen (NED)
3	4 August	Quintana Martín Galíndez to Villarcayo	156 km (97 mi)	Mountain stage	Bastien Tronchon (FRA)
4	5 August	Torresandino to Clunia	169 km (105 mi)	Medium-mountain stage	Matevž Govekar (SLO)
5	6 August	Lerma to Lagunas de Neila	170 km (110 mi)	Mountain stage	João Almeida (POR)
Total			810 km (500 mi)		

== Stages ==
=== Stage 1 ===
2 August 2022 – Burgos (Catedral) to Burgos (El Castillo), 157 km (98 mi)

Stage 1 Result
Rank	Rider	Team	Time
1	Santiago Buitrago (COL)	Team Bahrain Victorious	3h 43' 31"
2	Ruben Guerreiro (POR)	EF Education–EasyPost	+ 3"
3	Tao Geoghegan Hart (GBR)	Ineos Grenadiers	+ 3"
4	Jai Hindley (AUS)	Bora–Hansgrohe	+ 3"
5	Vincenzo Nibali (ITA)	Astana Qazaqstan Team	+ 5"
6	Wilco Kelderman (NED)	Bora–Hansgrohe	+ 5"
7	Iván García Cortina (ESP)	Movistar Team	+ 5"
8	Ilan Van Wilder (BEL)	Quick-Step Alpha Vinyl Team	+ 5"
9	Pavel Sivakov (FRA)	Ineos Grenadiers	+ 5"
10	Damien Touzé (FRA)	AG2R Citroën Team	+ 5"

General classification after Stage 1
Rank	Rider	Team	Time
1	Santiago Buitrago (COL)	Team Bahrain Victorious	3h 43' 31"
2	Ruben Guerreiro (POR)	EF Education–EasyPost	+ 3"
3	Tao Geoghegan Hart (GBR)	Ineos Grenadiers	+ 3"
4	Jai Hindley (AUS)	Bora–Hansgrohe	+ 3"
5	Vincenzo Nibali (ITA)	Astana Qazaqstan Team	+ 5"
6	Wilco Kelderman (NED)	Bora–Hansgrohe	+ 5"
7	Iván García Cortina (ESP)	Movistar Team	+ 5"
8	Ilan Van Wilder (BEL)	Quick-Step Alpha Vinyl Team	+ 5"
9	Pavel Sivakov (FRA)	Ineos Grenadiers	+ 5"
10	Damien Touzé (FRA)	AG2R Citroën Team	+ 5"

=== Stage 2 ===
3 August 2022 – Vivar del Cid to Villadiego, 158 km (98 mi)

Stage 2 Result
Rank	Rider	Team	Time
1	Timo Roosen (NED)	Team Jumbo–Visma	3h 48' 43"
2	Edoardo Affini (ITA)	Team Jumbo–Visma	+ 0"
3	Chris Harper (AUS)	Team Jumbo–Visma	+ 0"
4	Jon Aberasturi (ESP)	Trek–Segafredo	+ 0"
5	Carlos Rodríguez (ESP)	Ineos Grenadiers	+ 0"
6	Ruben Guerreiro (POR)	EF Education–EasyPost	+ 0"
7	Fernando Gaviria (COL)	UAE Team Emirates	+ 0"
8	Lilian Calmejane (FRA)	AG2R Citroën Team	+ 0"
9	Bastien Tronchon (FRA)	AG2R Citroën Team	+ 0"
10	Rudy Barbier (FRA)	Israel–Premier Tech	+ 0"

General classification after Stage 2
Rank	Rider	Team	Time
1	Santiago Buitrago (COL)	Team Bahrain Victorious	7h 32' 14"
2	Ruben Guerreiro (POR)	EF Education–EasyPost	+ 3"
3	Jai Hindley (AUS)	Bora–Hansgrohe	+ 3"
4	Tao Geoghegan Hart (GBR)	Ineos Grenadiers	+ 3"
5	Rui Costa (POR)	UAE Team Emirates	+ 5"
6	Pavel Sivakov (FRA)	Ineos Grenadiers	+ 5"
7	Jetse Bol (NED)	Burgos BH	+ 5"
8	Esteban Chaves (COL)	EF Education–EasyPost	+ 5"
9	Vincenzo Nibali (ITA)	Astana Qazaqstan Team	+ 5"
10	Laurens De Plus (BEL)	Ineos Grenadiers	+ 5"

=== Stage 3 ===
4 August 2022 – Quintana Martín Galíndez to Villarcayo, 156 km (97 mi)

Stage 3 Result
Rank	Rider	Team	Time
1	Bastien Tronchon (FRA)	AG2R Citroën Team	3h 42' 17"
2	Pavel Sivakov (FRA)	Ineos Grenadiers	+ 0"
3	Alejandro Valverde (ESP)	Movistar Team	+ 28"
4	Ruben Guerreiro (POR)	EF Education–EasyPost	+ 28"
5	Tao Geoghegan Hart (GBR)	Ineos Grenadiers	+ 28"
6	Ilan Van Wilder (BEL)	Quick-Step Alpha Vinyl Team	+ 28"
7	Santiago Buitrago (COL)	Team Bahrain Victorious	+ 28"
8	Vincenzo Nibali (ITA)	Astana Qazaqstan Team	+ 28"
9	Kenny Elissonde (FRA)	Trek–Segafredo	+ 28"
10	Esteban Chaves (COL)	EF Education–EasyPost	+ 28"

General classification after Stage 3
Rank	Rider	Team	Time
1	Pavel Sivakov (FRA)	Ineos Grenadiers	11h 14' 36"
2	Santiago Buitrago (COL)	Team Bahrain Victorious	+ 23"
3	Ruben Guerreiro (POR)	EF Education–EasyPost	+ 26"
4	Tao Geoghegan Hart (GBR)	Ineos Grenadiers	+ 26"
5	Jai Hindley (AUS)	Bora–Hansgrohe	+ 26"
6	Esteban Chaves (COL)	EF Education–EasyPost	+ 28"
7	Vincenzo Nibali (ITA)	Astana Qazaqstan Team	+ 28"
8	Wilco Kelderman (NED)	Bora–Hansgrohe	+ 28"
9	Laurens De Plus (BEL)	Ineos Grenadiers	+ 28"
10	Ilan Van Wilder (BEL)	Quick-Step Alpha Vinyl Team	+ 28"

=== Stage 4 ===
5 August 2022 – Torresandino to Clunia, 169 km (105 mi)

Stage 4 Result
Rank	Rider	Team	Time
1	Matevž Govekar (SLO)	Team Bahrain Victorious	3h 36' 18"
2	Valentin Retailleau (FRA)	AG2R Citroën Team	+ 0"
3	Omer Goldstein (ISR)	Israel–Premier Tech	+ 0"
4	Pieter Serry (BEL)	Quick-Step Alpha Vinyl Team	+ 0"
5	Patrick Gamper (AUT)	Bora–Hansgrohe	+ 5"
6	Xabier Azparren (ESP)	Euskaltel–Euskadi	+ 5"
7	Lluis Mas (ESP)	Movistar Team	+ 12"
8	Fernando Barceló (ESP)	Caja Rural–Seguros RGA	+ 57"
9	Lennard Hofstede (NED)	Team Jumbo–Visma	+ 1' 10"
10	David Martín (ESP)	Eolo–Kometa	+ 1' 16"

General classification after Stage 4
Rank	Rider	Team	Time
1	Pavel Sivakov (FRA)	Ineos Grenadiers	14h 53' 57"
2	Santiago Buitrago (COL)	Team Bahrain Victorious	+ 23"
3	Ruben Guerreiro (POR)	EF Education–EasyPost	+ 26"
4	Tao Geoghegan Hart (GBR)	Ineos Grenadiers	+ 26"
5	Jai Hindley (AUS)	Bora–Hansgrohe	+ 26"
6	Esteban Chaves (COL)	EF Education–EasyPost	+ 28"
7	Vincenzo Nibali (ITA)	Astana Qazaqstan Team	+ 28"
8	Wilco Kelderman (NED)	Bora–Hansgrohe	+ 28"
9	Ilan Van Wilder (BEL)	Quick-Step Alpha Vinyl Team	+ 28"
10	Laurens De Plus (BEL)	Ineos Grenadiers	+ 28"

=== Stage 5 ===
6 August 2022 – Lerma to Lagunas de Neila, 170 km (110 mi)

Stage 5 Result
Rank	Rider	Team	Time
1	João Almeida (POR)	UAE Team Emirates	4h 06' 19"
2	Miguel Ángel López (COL)	Astana Qazaqstan Team	+ 0"
3	Pavel Sivakov (FRA)	Ineos Grenadiers	+ 7"
4	Carlos Rodríguez (ESP)	Ineos Grenadiers	+ 15"
5	Ilan Van Wilder (BEL)	Quick-Step Alpha Vinyl Team	+ 21"
6	Ruben Guerreiro (POR)	EF Education–EasyPost	+ 28"
7	Jai Hindley (AUS)	Bora–Hansgrohe	+ 33"
8	Kenny Elissonde (FRA)	Trek–Segafredo	+ 43"
9	Hugh Carthy (GBR)	EF Education–EasyPost	+ 48"
10	Wilco Kelderman (NED)	Bora–Hansgrohe	+ 48"

Final general classification
Rank	Rider	Team	Time
1	Pavel Sivakov (FRA)	Ineos Grenadiers	19h 00' 23"
2	João Almeida (POR)	UAE Team Emirates	+ 35"
3	Miguel Ángel López (COL)	Astana Qazaqstan Team	+ 35"
4	Carlos Rodríguez (ESP)	Ineos Grenadiers	+ 41"
5	Ilan Van Wilder (BEL)	Quick-Step Alpha Vinyl Team	+ 42"
6	Ruben Guerreiro (POR)	EF Education–EasyPost	+ 47"
7	Jai Hindley (AUS)	Bora–Hansgrohe	+ 52"
8	Santiago Buitrago (COL)	Team Bahrain Victorious	+ 1' 06"
9	Wilco Kelderman (NED)	Bora–Hansgrohe	+ 1' 09"
10	Kenny Elissonde (FRA)	Trek–Segafredo	+ 1' 18"

== Classification leadership table ==
Classification leadership by stage
Stage	Winner	General classification	Points classification	Mountains classification	Young rider classification	Team classification
1	Santiago Buitrago	Santiago Buitrago	Santiago Buitrago (Note: On stage 2, Ruben Guerreiro, who was second in the points classification, wore the green jersey, because first placed Santiago Buitrago wore the violet jersey as the leader of the general classification.)	Diego Pablo Sevilla	Santiago Buitrago (Note: On stages 2-3, Ilan Van Wilder, who was second in the youth classification, wore the white jersey, because first placed Santiago Buitrago wore the violet jersey as the leader of the general classification.)	Ineos Grenadiers
2	Timo Roosen	Santiago Buitrago	Ruben Guerreiro	Xabier Azparren	Santiago Buitrago	Ineos Grenadiers
3	Bastien Tronchon	Pavel Sivakov	Ruben Guerreiro	Vojtěch Řepa	Santiago Buitrago	Ineos Grenadiers
4	Matevž Govekar	Pavel Sivakov	Ruben Guerreiro	Vojtěch Řepa	Santiago Buitrago	Bora–Hansgrohe
5	João Almeida	Pavel Sivakov	Ruben Guerreiro	Miguel Ángel López	Carlos Rodríguez	Bora–Hansgrohe
Final		Pavel Sivakov	Ruben Guerreiro	Miguel Ángel López	Carlos Rodríguez	Bora–Hansgrohe

== Final classification standings ==
Legend
Denotes the winner of the general classification	Denotes the winner of the mountains classification
Denotes the winner of the points classification	Denotes the winner of the young rider classification

=== General classification ===
Final general classification (1–10)
Rank	Rider	Team	Time
1	Pavel Sivakov (FRA)	Ineos Grenadiers	19h 00' 23"
2	João Almeida (POR)	UAE Team Emirates	+ 35"
3	Miguel Ángel López (COL)	Astana Qazaqstan Team	+ 35"
4	Carlos Rodríguez (ESP)	Ineos Grenadiers	+ 41"
5	Ilan Van Wilder (BEL)	Quick-Step Alpha Vinyl Team	+ 42"
6	Ruben Guerreiro (POR)	EF Education–EasyPost	+ 47"
7	Jai Hindley (AUS)	Bora–Hansgrohe	+ 52"
8	Santiago Buitrago (COL)	Team Bahrain Victorious	+ 1' 06"
9	Wilco Kelderman (NED)	Bora–Hansgrohe	+ 1' 09"
10	Kenny Elissonde (FRA)	Trek–Segafredo	+ 1' 18"

=== Points classification ===
Final points classification (1–10)
Rank	Rider	Team	Points
1	Ruben Guerreiro (POR)	EF Education–EasyPost	54
2	Pavel Sivakov (FRA)	Ineos Grenadiers	43
3	Santiago Buitrago (COL)	Team Bahrain Victorious	38
4	Bastien Tronchon (FRA)	AG2R Citroën Team	32
5	Carlos Rodríguez (ESP)	Ineos Grenadiers	31
6	Ilan Van Wilder (BEL)	Quick-Step Alpha Vinyl Team	30
7	Tao Geoghegan Hart (GBR)	Ineos Grenadiers	30
8	João Almeida (POR)	UAE Team Emirates	25
9	Matevž Govekar (SLO)	Team Bahrain Victorious	25
10	Jai Hindley (AUS)	Bora–Hansgrohe	24

=== Mountains classification ===
Final mountains classification (1–10)
Rank	Rider	Team	Points
1	Miguel Ángel López (COL)	Astana Qazaqstan Team	49
2	Pavel Sivakov (FRA)	Ineos Grenadiers	42
3	Vojtěch Řepa (CZE)	Equipo Kern Pharma	35
4	João Almeida (POR)	UAE Team Emirates	30
5	Xabier Azparren (ESP)	Euskaltel–Euskadi	28
6	Joel Nicolau (ESP)	Caja Rural–Seguros RGA	26
7	Bastien Tronchon (FRA)	AG2R Citroën Team	26
8	Diego Pablo Sevilla (ESP)	Eolo–Kometa	23
9	Jesus Ezquerra (ESP)	Burgos BH	22
10	Carlos Rodríguez (ESP)	Ineos Grenadiers	20

=== Young rider classification ===
Final young rider classification (1–10)
Rank	Rider	Team	Time
1	Carlos Rodríguez (ESP)	Ineos Grenadiers	19h 01' 04"
2	Ilan Van Wilder (BEL)	Quick-Step Alpha Vinyl Team	+ 1"
3	Santiago Buitrago (COL)	Team Bahrain Victorious	+ 25"
4	Matthew Riccitello (USA)	Israel–Premier Tech	+ 4' 52"
5	Alex Martin Gutierrez (ESP)	Eolo–Kometa	+ 9' 51"
6	Bastien Tronchon (FRA)	AG2R Citroën Team	+ 12' 47"
7	Marco Frigo (ITA)	Israel–Premier Tech	+ 13' 20"
8	Vojtěch Řepa (CZE)	Equipo Kern Pharma	+ 13' 40"
9	Raúl García (ESP)	Equipo Kern Pharma	+ 13' 45"
10	Mason Hollyman (GBR)	Israel–Premier Tech	+ 14' 18"

=== Spanish rider classification ===
Final spanish rider classification (1–10)
Rank	Rider	Team	Time
1	Carlos Rodríguez (ESP)	Ineos Grenadiers	19h 01' 04"
2	Joel Nicolau (ESP)	Caja Rural–Seguros RGA	+ 1' 11"
3	Alejandro Valverde (ESP)	Movistar Team	+ 1' 26"
4	Mikel Bizkarra (ESP)	Euskaltel–Euskadi	+ 1' 28"
5	José Manuel Díaz (ESP)	Burgos BH	+ 1' 39"
6	Urko Berrade (ESP)	Equipo Kern Pharma	+ 3' 29"
7	Antonio Pedrero (ESP)	Movistar Team	+ 3' 31"
8	Óscar Cabedo (ESP)	Burgos BH	+ 3' 33"
9	Jonathan Lastra (ESP)	Caja Rural–Seguros RGA	+ 5' 23"
10	Mikel Nieve (ESP)	Caja Rural–Seguros RGA	+ 6' 11"

=== Team classification ===
Final team classification (1–10)
Rank	Team	Time
1	Bora–Hansgrohe	57h 02' 04"
2	Ineos Grenadiers	+ 1' 17"
3	Team Bahrain Victorious	+ 3' 15"
4	Movistar Team	+ 3' 38"
5	EF Education–EasyPost	+ 3' 58"
6	Astana Qazaqstan Team	+ 9' 04"
7	Caja Rural–Seguros RGA	+ 9' 31"
8	Quick-Step Alpha Vinyl Team	+ 10' 39"
9	Burgos BH	+ 12' 16"
10	Equipo Kern Pharma	+ 13' 26"
