= 2022 Clásica de Almería =

2022 UCI ProSeries

Race details
- Dates: 13 February 2022
- Stages: 1
- Distance: 188.2 km (116.9 mi)
- Winning time: 4h 22' 39"

Results
	Winner	Alexander Kristoff (NOR)	(Intermarché–Wanty–Gobert Matériaux)
	Second	Nacer Bouhanni (FRA)	(Arkéa–Samsic)
	Third	Giacomo Nizzolo (ITA)	(Israel–Premier Tech)
	Mountains	Xabier Azparren (ESP)	(Euskaltel–Euskadi)
	Sprints	Lukas Pöstlberger (AUT)	(Bora–Hansgrohe)

The 2022 Clásica de Almería was the 37th edition of the Clásica de Almería one-day road cycling race. It was held on 13 February 2022 as a category 1.Pro race on the 2022 UCI ProSeries.

The 188.2-kilometre (116.9 mi) race took place in the Spanish province of Almería, from El Ejido to Roquetas de Mar. The first half of the race course featured several climbs, the most prominent of which was the second-category Alto de Celín, which crested less than 50 kilometres (31 mi) into the race. On the other hand, the last 70 kilometres (43 mi) were mostly flat, finishing with a longer circuit around Roquetas de Mar before a shorter finishing circuit at 6 kilometres (3.7 mi) long.

The race's main breakaway consisted of three riders: Xabier Azparren, Gilles De Wilde, and Lukas Pöstlberger. The trio claimed almost all of the intermediate sprint and mountains classifications points on offer throughout the route, with Azparren winning the mountains classification and Pöstlberger winning the intermediate sprint classification. With over 40 kilometres (25 mi) left, De Wilde was the first to be dropped from the lead group, while the remaining duo were caught by the peloton with under 18 kilometres (11 mi) left. There were several crashes in the final few kilometres, but in the final sprint, Alexander Kristoff won by a narrow margin ahead of Nacer Bouhanni and defending champion Giacomo Nizzolo.

== Teams ==
Eight of the 18 UCI WorldTeams and 11 UCI ProTeams made up the 19 teams that participated in the race. 12 teams entered a full squad of seven riders each. Four teams (Astana Qazaqstan Team, Bora–Hansgrohe, Cofidis, and UAE Team Emirates) entered a squad of six riders each, and two teams (Human Powered Health and Israel–Premier Tech) entered a squad of five riders each, while Team TotalEnergies was only able to enter a squad of four riders. In total, 122 riders started the race, of which 112 finished.

UCI WorldTeams

- Astana Qazaqstan Team
- Bora–Hansgrohe
- Cofidis
- EF Education–EasyPost
- Intermarché–Wanty–Gobert Matériaux
- Israel–Premier Tech
- Movistar Team
- UAE Team Emirates

UCI ProTeams

- Arkéa–Samsic
- Bingoal Pauwels Sauces WB
- Burgos BH
- Caja Rural–Seguros RGA
- Drone Hopper–Androni Giocattoli
- Eolo–Kometa
- Equipo Kern Pharma
- Euskaltel–Euskadi
- Human Powered Health
- Sport Vlaanderen–Baloise
- Team TotalEnergies

== Result ==
Result (1–10)
Rank	Rider	Team	Time
1	Alexander Kristoff (NOR)	Intermarché–Wanty–Gobert Matériaux	4h 22' 39"
2	Nacer Bouhanni (FRA)	Arkéa–Samsic	+ 0"
3	Giacomo Nizzolo (ITA)	Israel–Premier Tech	+ 0"
4	Stanisław Aniołkowski (POL)	Bingoal Pauwels Sauces WB	+ 0"
5	Juan Sebastián Molano (COL)	UAE Team Emirates	+ 0"
6	Simone Consonni (ITA)	Cofidis	+ 0"
7	Marijn van den Berg (NED)	EF Education–EasyPost	+ 0"
8	Jules Hesters (BEL)	Sport Vlaanderen–Baloise	+ 0"
9	Vincenzo Albanese (ITA)	Eolo–Kometa	+ 0"
10	Max Kanter (GER)	Movistar Team	+ 0"

Mountains classification (1–3)
Rank	Rider	Team	Points
1	Xabier Azparren (ESP)	Euskaltel–Euskadi	15
2	Gilles De Wilde (BEL)	Sport Vlaanderen–Baloise	9
3	Lukas Pöstlberger (AUT)	Bora–Hansgrohe	6

Intermediate sprints classification (1–4)
Rank	Rider	Team	Points
1	Lukas Pöstlberger (AUT)	Bora–Hansgrohe	12
2	Xabier Azparren (ESP)	Euskaltel–Euskadi	7
3	Gilles De Wilde (BEL)	Sport Vlaanderen–Baloise	4
4	Alexander Cataford (CAN)	Israel–Premier Tech	1
