= 2023 Saudi Tour =

Saudi Arabian cycling race

2023 UCI Asia Tour

Race details
- Dates: 30 January–3 February 2023
- Stages: 5
- Distance: 830.5 km (516.0 mi)

Results
| Jersey awarded to the overall winner | Winner | Ruben Guerreiro (POR) | (Movistar Team) |
| | Second | Davide Formolo (ITA) | (UAE Team Emirates) |
| | Third | Santiago Buitrago (COL) | (Team Bahrain Victorious) |
| Jersey awarded to the points classification winner | Points | Dylan Groenewegen (NED) | (Team Jayco–AlUla) |
| Jersey awarded to the youth classification winner | Youth | Santiago Buitrago (COL) | (Team Bahrain Victorious) |
| | Team | Movistar Team | |

The 2023 Saudi Tour was a road cycling stage race that took place between 30 January and 3 February 2023 in Saudi Arabia. The race is rated as a category 2.1 event on the 2023 UCI Asia Tour calendar, and is the seventh edition of the Saudi Tour.

== Teams ==
Made up of 16 cycling teams, only two teams did not enter seven riders (UAE Team Emirates and Astana Qazaqstan Team entered six riders each). In total, 110 riders started the race.

UCI WorldTeams

- Team Bahrain Victorious
- Team Jayco–AlUla
- UAE Team Emirates
- Team DSM
- Cofidis
- Movistar Team
- Astana Qazaqstan Team

UCI ProTeams

- Uno-X Pro Cycling Team
- Human Powered Health
- Q36.5 Pro Cycling Team
- Euskaltel–Euskadi
- Team Corratec
- Bingoal WB

UCI Continental Teams

- JCL Team Ukyo
- Terengganu Polygon Cycling Team

National team

- Saudi Arabia

== Route ==
Stage characteristics and winners
| Stage | Date | Course | Distance | Type | Stage winner |
|---|---|---|---|---|---|
| 1 | 30 January | Alula Airport to Khaybar | 180.5 km (112.2 mi) | Flat stage | Dylan Groenewegen (NED) |
| 2 | 31 January | Winter Park to Shalal Sijlyat Rocks | 184 km (114 mi) | Flat stage | Jonathan Milan (ITA) |
| 3 | 1 February | Al Manshiyah Train Station to Abu Rakah | 159.5 km (99.1 mi) | Flat stage | Søren Wærenskjold (NOR) |
| 4 | 2 February | Maraya to Skyviews of Harrat Uwayrid | 163.5 km (101.6 mi) | Flat stage | Ruben Guerreiro (POR) |
| 5 | 3 February | Al Ula Old Town to Maraya | 143 km (89 mi) | Flat stage | Simone Consonni (ITA) |
| Total | | | 830.5 km (516.0 mi) | | |

== Stages ==
=== Stage 1 ===
30 January 2023 — AIUIa International Airport to Khaybar, 180.5 km (112.2 mi)

Stage 1 Result (1–10)
| Rank | Rider | Team | Time |
|---|---|---|---|
| 1 | Dylan Groenewegen (NED) | Team Jayco–AlUla | 4h 08' 09" |
| 2 | Dušan Rajović (SRB) | Team Bahrain Victorious | + 0" |
| 3 | Max Walscheid (GER) | Cofidis | + 0" |
| 4 | Søren Wærenskjold (NOR) | Uno-X Pro Cycling Team | + 0" |
| 5 | Max Kanter (GER) | Movistar Team | + 0" |
| 6 | Ivo Oliveira (POR) | UAE Team Emirates | + 0" |
| 7 | Cees Bol (NED) | Astana Qazaqstan Team | + 0" |
| 8 | Stian Fredheim (NOR) | Uno-X Pro Cycling Team | + 0" |
| 9 | Marco Tizza (ITA) | Bingoal WB | + 0" |
| 10 | Luka Mezgec (SLO) | Team Jayco–AlUla | + 0" |

General classification after Stage 1 (1–10)
| Rank | Rider | Team | Time |
|---|---|---|---|
| 1 | Dylan Groenewegen (NED) | Team Jayco–AlUla | 4h 07' 59" |
| 2 | Dušan Rajović (SRB) | Team Bahrain Victorious | + 4" |
| 3 | Max Walscheid (GER) | Cofidis | + 6" |
| 4 | Marcus Hansen (DEN) | Uno-X Pro Cycling Team | + 7" |
| 5 | Søren Wærenskjold (NOR) | Uno-X Pro Cycling Team | + 10" |
| 6 | Max Kanter (GER) | Movistar Team | + 10" |
| 7 | Ivo Oliveira (POR) | UAE Team Emirates | + 10" |
| 8 | Cees Bol (NED) | Astana Qazaqstan Team | + 10" |
| 9 | Stian Fredheim (NOR) | Uno-X Pro Cycling Team | + 10" |
| 10 | Marco Tizza (ITA) | Bingoal WB | + 10" |

=== Stage 2 ===
31 January 2023 — Winter Park to Shalal Sijlyat Rocks, 184 km (114 mi)

Stage 2 Result (1–10)
| Rank | Rider | Team | Time |
|---|---|---|---|
| 1 | Jonathan Milan (ITA) | Team Bahrain Victorious | 4h 53' 35" |
| 2 | Dylan Groenewegen (NED) | Team Jayco–AlUla | + 0" |
| 3 | Cees Bol (NED) | Astana Qazaqstan Team | + 0" |
| 4 | Erlend Blikra (NOR) | Uno-X Pro Cycling Team | + 0" |
| 5 | Max Kanter (GER) | Movistar Team | + 0" |
| 6 | Max Walscheid (GER) | Cofidis | + 0" |
| 7 | Ryan Gibbons (RSA) | Team Bahrain Victorious | + 0" |
| 8 | Luka Mezgec (SLO) | Team Jayco–AlUla | + 0" |
| 9 | Simone Consonni (ITA) | Cofidis | + 0" |
| 10 | Szymon Sajnok (POL) | Q36.5 Pro Cycling Team | + 0" |

General classification after Stage 2 (1–10)
| Rank | Rider | Team | Time |
|---|---|---|---|
| 1 | Dylan Groenewegen (NED) | Team Jayco–AlUla | 9h 01' 28" |
| 2 | Jonathan Milan (ITA) | Team Bahrain Victorious | + 6" |
| 3 | Max Walscheid (GER) | Cofidis | + 12" |
| 4 | Cees Bol (NED) | Astana Qazaqstan Team | + 12" |
| 5 | Max Kanter (GER) | Movistar Team | + 16" |
| 6 | Ryan Gibbons (RSA) | UAE Team Emirates | + 16" |
| 7 | Erlend Blikra (NOR) | Uno-X Pro Cycling Team | + 16" |
| 8 | Luka Mezgec (SLO) | Team Jayco–AlUla | + 19" |
| 9 | Pier-André Côté (CAN) | Human Powered Health | + 19" |
| 10 | Simone Consonni (ITA) | Cofidis | + 19" |

=== Stage 3 ===
1 February 2023 — Al Manshiyah Train Station > Abu Rakah, 159.5 km (99.1 mi)

Stage 3 Result (1–10)
| Rank | Rider | Team | Time |
|---|---|---|---|
| 1 | Søren Wærenskjold (NOR) | Uno-X Pro Cycling Team | 4h 23' 18" |
| 2 | Jonathan Milan (ITA) | Team Bahrain Victorious | + 0" |
| 3 | Cees Bol (NED) | Astana Qazaqstan Team | + 0" |
| 4 | Simone Consonni (ITA) | Cofidis | + 0" |
| 5 | Ruben Guerreiro (POR) | Movistar Team | + 0" |
| 6 | Felix Grossschartner (GER) | UAE Team Emirates | + 0" |
| 7 | Davide Formolo (ITA) | UAE Team Emirates | + 0" |
| 8 | Alessandro Fedeli (ITA) | Q36.5 Pro Cycling Team | + 0" |
| 9 | Max Kanter (GER) | Movistar Team | + 0" |
| 10 | Pier-André Côté (CAN) | Human Powered Health | + 0" |

General classification after Stage 3 (1–10)
| Rank | Rider | Team | Time |
|---|---|---|---|
| 1 | Jonathan Milan (ITA) | Team Bahrain Victorious | 13h 24' 46" |
| 2 | Cees Bol (NED) | Astana Qazaqstan Team | + 8" |
| 3 | Max Kanter (GER) | Movistar Team | + 16" |
| 4 | Ruben Guerreiro (POR) | Movistar Team | + 17" |
| 5 | Felix Grossschartner (GER) | UAE Team Emirates | + 18" |
| 6 | Simone Consonni (ITA) | Cofidis | + 19" |
| 7 | Luka Mezgec (SLO) | Team Jayco–AlUla | + 19" |
| 8 | Pier-André Côté (CAN) | Human Powered Health | + 19" |
| 9 | Andoni Lopez de Abetxuko (ESP) | Euskaltel–Euskadi | + 19" |
| 10 | Marco Tizza (ITA) | Bingoal WB | + 19" |

=== Stage 4 ===
2 February 2023 — Maraya > Skyviews of Harrat Uwayrid, 163.5 km (101.6 mi)

Stage 4 Result (1–10)
| Rank | Rider | Team | Time |
|---|---|---|---|
| 1 | Ruben Guerreiro (POR) | Movistar Team | 3h 45' 01" |
| 2 | Davide Formolo (ITA) | UAE Team Emirates | + 0" |
| 3 | Santiago Buitrago (COL) | Team Bahrain Victorious | + 0" |
| 4 | Felix Großschartner (AUT) | UAE Team Emirates | + 4" |
| 5 | Will Barta (USA) | Movistar Team | + 22" |
| 6 | Gregor Mühlberger (AUT) | UAE Team Emirates | + 23" |
| 7 | Axel Mariault (FRA) | Cofidis | + 23" |
| 8 | Xabier Mikel Azparren (ESP) | Euskaltel–Euskadi | + 23" |
| 9 | Luka Mezgec (SLO) | Team Jayco–AlUla | + 28" |
| 10 | Simone Consonni (ITA) | Cofidis | + 28" |

General classification after Stage 4 (1–10)
| Rank | Rider | Team | Time |
|---|---|---|---|
| 1 | Ruben Guerreiro (POR) | Movistar Team | 17h 09' 51" |
| 2 | Davide Formolo (ITA) | UAE Team Emirates | + 8" |
| 3 | Santiago Buitrago (COL) | Team Bahrain Victorious | + 9" |
| 4 | Felix Großschartner (AUT) | UAE Team Emirates | + 16" |
| 5 | Jonathan Milan (ITA) | Team Bahrain Victorious | + 24" |
| 6 | Cees Bol (NED) | Astana Qazaqstan Team | + 32" |
| 7 | Will Barta (USA) | Movistar Team | + 37" |
| 8 | Xabier Mikel Azparren (ESP) | Euskaltel–Euskadi | + 38" |
| 9 | Simone Consonni (ITA) | Cofidis | + 43" |
| 10 | Luka Mezgec (SLO) | Team Jayco–AlUla | + 43" |

=== Stage 5 ===
3 February 2023 — AIUIa Old Town > Maraya, 143 km (89 mi)

Stage 5 Result (1–10)
| Rank | Rider | Team | Time |
|---|---|---|---|
| 1 | Simone Consonni (ITA) | Cofidis | 3h 10' 13" |
| 2 | Matteo Malucelli (ITA) | Bingoal WB | + 0" |
| 3 | Pascal Ackermann (GER) | UAE Team Emirates | + 0" |
| 4 | Dylan Groenewegen (NED) | Team Jayco–AlUla | + 0" |
| 5 | Max Kanter (GER) | Movistar Team | + 0" |
| 6 | Cees Bol (NED) | Astana Qazaqstan Team | + 0" |
| 7 | Juan Jose Lobato (ESP) | Euskaltel–Euskadi | + 0" |
| 8 | Marco Tizza (ITA) | Bingoal WB | + 0" |
| 9 | Szymon Sajnok (POL) | Q36.5 Pro Cycling Team | + 0" |
| 10 | Jonathan Milan (ITA) | Team Bahrain Victorious | + 24" |

General classification after Stage 5 (1–10)
| Rank | Rider | Team | Time |
|---|---|---|---|
| 1 | Ruben Guerreiro (POR) | Movistar Team | 20h 20' 04" |
| 2 | Davide Formolo (ITA) | UAE Team Emirates | + 8" |
| 3 | Santiago Buitrago (COL) | Team Bahrain Victorious | + 9" |
| 4 | Felix Großschartner (AUT) | UAE Team Emirates | + 18" |
| 5 | Jonathan Milan (ITA) | Team Bahrain Victorious | + 24" |
| 6 | Cees Bol (NED) | Astana Qazaqstan Team | + 32" |
| 7 | Simone Consonni (ITA) | Cofidis | + 33" |
| 8 | Will Barta (USA) | Movistar Team | + 37" |
| 9 | Xabier Mikel Azparren (ESP) | Euskaltel–Euskadi | + 38" |
| 10 | Marco Tizza (ITA) | Bingoal WB | + 43" |

== Classification leadership table ==
Classification leadership by stage
| Stage | Winner | General classification | Points classification | Active rider classification | Young rider classification | Team classification |
|---|---|---|---|---|---|---|
| 1 | Dylan Groenewegen | Dylan Groenewegen | Dylan Groenewegen | Marcus Sander Hansen | Marcus Sander Hansen | Movistar Team |
| 2 | Jonathan Milan | Dylan Groenewegen | Dylan Groenewegen | Marcus Sander Hansen | Jonathan Milan | Movistar Team |
| 3 | Søren Wærenskjold | Jonathan Milan | Jonathan Milan | Marcus Sander Hansen | Jonathan Milan | Movistar Team |
| 4 | Ruben Guerreiro | Ruben Guerreiro | Jonathan Milan | Marcus Sander Hansen | Santiago Buitrago | UAE Team Emirates |
| 5 | Simone Consonni | Ruben Guerreiro | Dylan Groenewegen | Marcus Sander Hansen | Santiago Buitrago | UAE Team Emirates |
| Final | | Ruben Guerreiro | Dylan Groenewegen | Marcus Sander Hansen | Santiago Buitrago | UAE Team Emirates |

== Final classification standings ==
Legend
| Denotes the winner of the general classification | Denotes the winner of the active rider classification |
| Denotes the winner of the points classification | Denotes the winner of the young rider classification |

=== General classification ===
Final general classification (1–10)
| Rank | Rider | Team | Time |
|---|---|---|---|
| 1 | Ruben Guerreiro (POR) | Movistar Team | 20h 20' 04" |
| 2 | Davide Formolo (ITA) | UAE Team Emirates | + 8" |
| 3 | Santiago Buitrago (COL) | Team Bahrain Victorious | + 9" |
| 4 | Felix Großschartner (AUT) | UAE Team Emirates | + 18" |
| 5 | Jonathan Milan (ITA) | Team Bahrain Victorious | + 24" |
| 6 | Cees Bol (NED) | Astana Qazaqstan Team | + 32" |
| 7 | Simone Consonni (ITA) | Cofidis | + 33" |
| 8 | Will Barta (USA) | Movistar Team | + 37" |
| 9 | Xabier Mikel Azparren (ESP) | Euskaltel–Euskadi | + 38" |
| 10 | Marco Tizza (ITA) | Bingoal WB | + 43" |

=== Points classification ===
Final points classification (1–10)
| Rank | Rider | Team | Points |
|---|---|---|---|
| 1 | Dylan Groenewegen (NED) | Team Jayco–AlUla | 34 |
| 2 | Jonathan Milan (ITA) | Team Bahrain Victorious | 28 |
| 3 | Cees Bol (NED) | Astana Qazaqstan Team | 27 |
| 4 | Simone Consonni (ITA) | Cofidis | 25 |
| 5 | Søren Wærenskjold (NOR) | Uno-X Pro Cycling Team | 22 |
| 6 | Ruben Guerreiro (POR) | Movistar Team | 21 |
| 7 | Max Kanter (GER) | Movistar Team | 20 |
| 8 | Davide Formolo (ITA) | UAE Team Emirates | 16 |
| 9 | Max Walscheid (GER) | Cofidis | 14 |
| 10 | Felix Großschartner (AUT) | UAE Team Emirates | 12 |

=== Young rider classification ===
Final young rider classification (1–10)
| Rank | Rider | Team | Time |
|---|---|---|---|
| 1 | Santiago Buitrago (COL) | Team Bahrain Victorious | 20h 20' 13" |
| 2 | Jonathan Milan (ITA) | Team Bahrain Victorious | + 15" |
| 3 | Xabier Mikel Azparren (ESP) | Euskaltel–Euskadi | + 29" |
| 4 | Jacob Hindsgaul Madsen (DEN) | Uno-X Pro Cycling Team | + 34" |
| 5 | Mark Donovan (GBR) | Q36.5 Pro Cycling Team | + 34" |
| 6 | Embret Svestad-Bårdseng (NOR) | Human Powered Health | + 39" |
| 7 | Casper van Uden (NED) | Team DSM | + 2' 50" |
| 8 | Axel Mariault (FRA) | Cofidis | + 3' 38" |
| 9 | Filip Maciejuk (POL) | Team Bahrain Victorious | + 3' 52" |
| 10 | Nickolas Zukowsky (CAN) | Q36.5 Pro Cycling Team | + 5' 04" |

=== Team classification ===
Final team classification (1–10)
| Rank | Team | Time |
|---|---|---|
| 1 | Movistar Team | 61h 01' 39" |
| 2 | UAE Team Emirates | + 20" |
| 3 | Cofidis | + 39" |
| 4 | Team Bahrain Victorious | + 2' 02" |
| 5 | Bingoal WB | + 2' 17" |
| 6 | Team Jayco–AlUla | + 3' 24" |
| 7 | Euskaltel–Euskadi | + 4' 16" |
| 8 | Astana Qazaqstan Team | + 4' 22" |
| 9 | Human Powered Health | + 5' 47" |
| 10 | Q36.5 Pro Cycling Team | + 5' 58" |
