= Santiago Buitrago =

Colombian cyclist (born 1999)

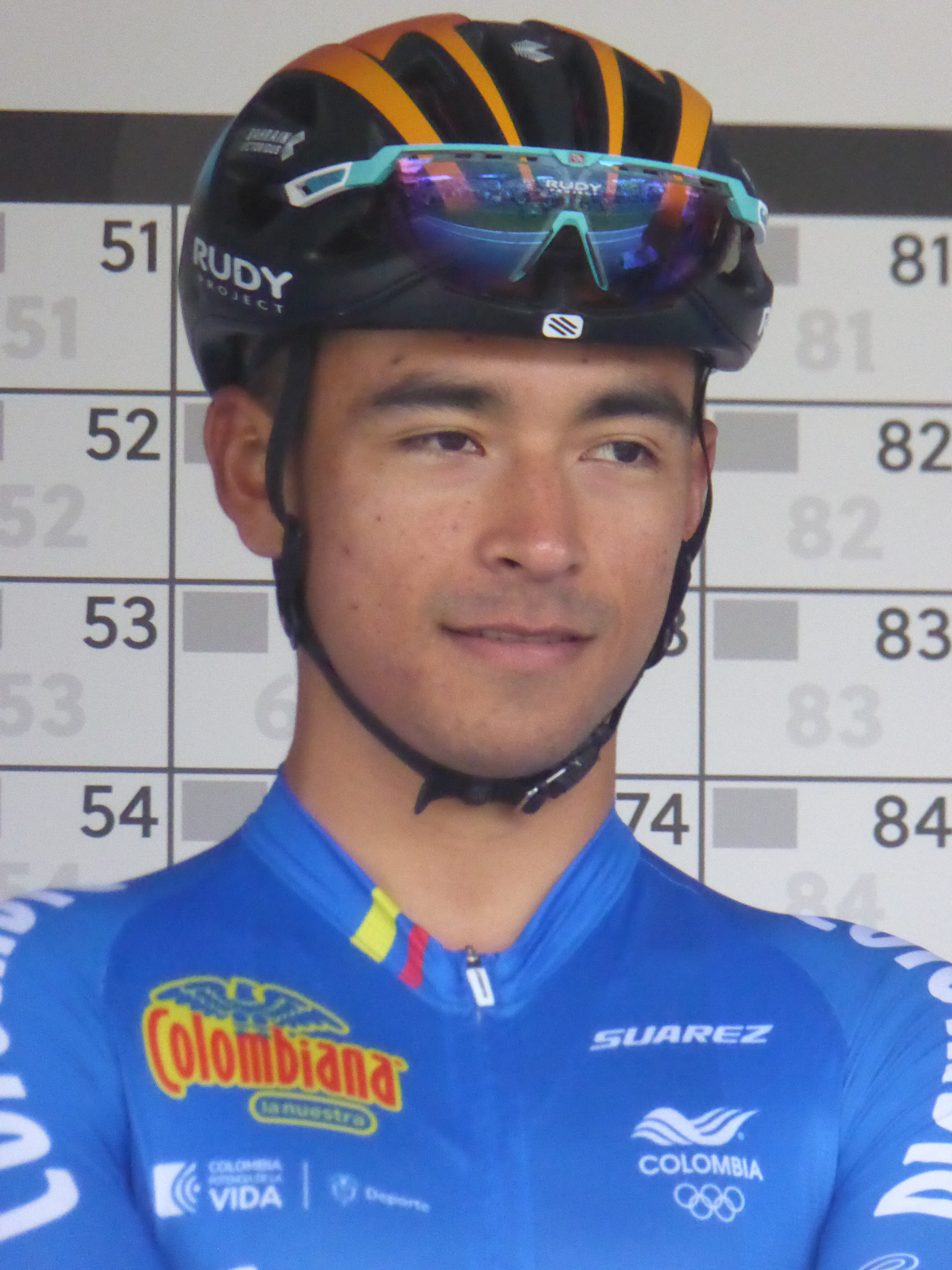
- Buitrago in 2023

Personal information
- Full name: Santiago Buitrago Sánchez
- Born: 26 September 1999 (age 27) Bogotá, Colombia
- Height: 1.74 m (5 ft 9 in)
- Weight: 59 kg (130 lb)

Cycling career
- Sport: Cycling
- Current team: Team Bahrain Victorious
- Discipline: Road
- Role: Rider
- Rider type: Climber

Amateur team
- 2018–2019: Team Cinelli

Professional team
- 2020–: Bahrain–McLaren

Major wins
- Grand Tours Giro d'Italia 2 individual stages (2022, 2023) Vuelta a España Mountains classification (2026) Stage races Volta a la Comunitat Valenciana (2025) One-day races and Classics Trofeo Laigueglia (2026)

Santiago Buitrago Sánchez (born 26 September 1999) is a Colombian road racing cyclist, who rides for UCI WorldTeam Team Bahrain Victorious. Buitrago has won two stages at the Giro d'Italia.

== Career ==
Santiago Buitrago's first UCI rated result is at the Colombian Junior time trial championships where he finished fourth.

=== Bahrain–McLaren (2020–present) ===
==== 2020–2021 ====
Buitrago joined UCI WorldTeam Bahrain–McLaren on a two-year contract after impressing the team by finishing sixth at the Giro della Valle d'Aosta in 2019. His first race with the team was at the 2020 Tour Down Under where he finished second in the youth classification 15 seconds behind Pavel Sivakov. The last race of the 2020 season was the Vuelta a España, his first Grand tour, he would finish in 53rd.

In 2021 he finished tenth overall at the Tour de Hongrie after a strong tenth in the Queen-stage. He then won the mountains classification at the Settimana Ciclistica Italiana after being in the break and attacking over the climbs of the day. Buitrago finished eighth in the Vuelta a Burgos after fishing one second behind the winner on stage 1 of the race. He also led the youth classification until the final stage where he lost the jersey to Einer Rubio who came second in the stage.

==== 2022–present ====
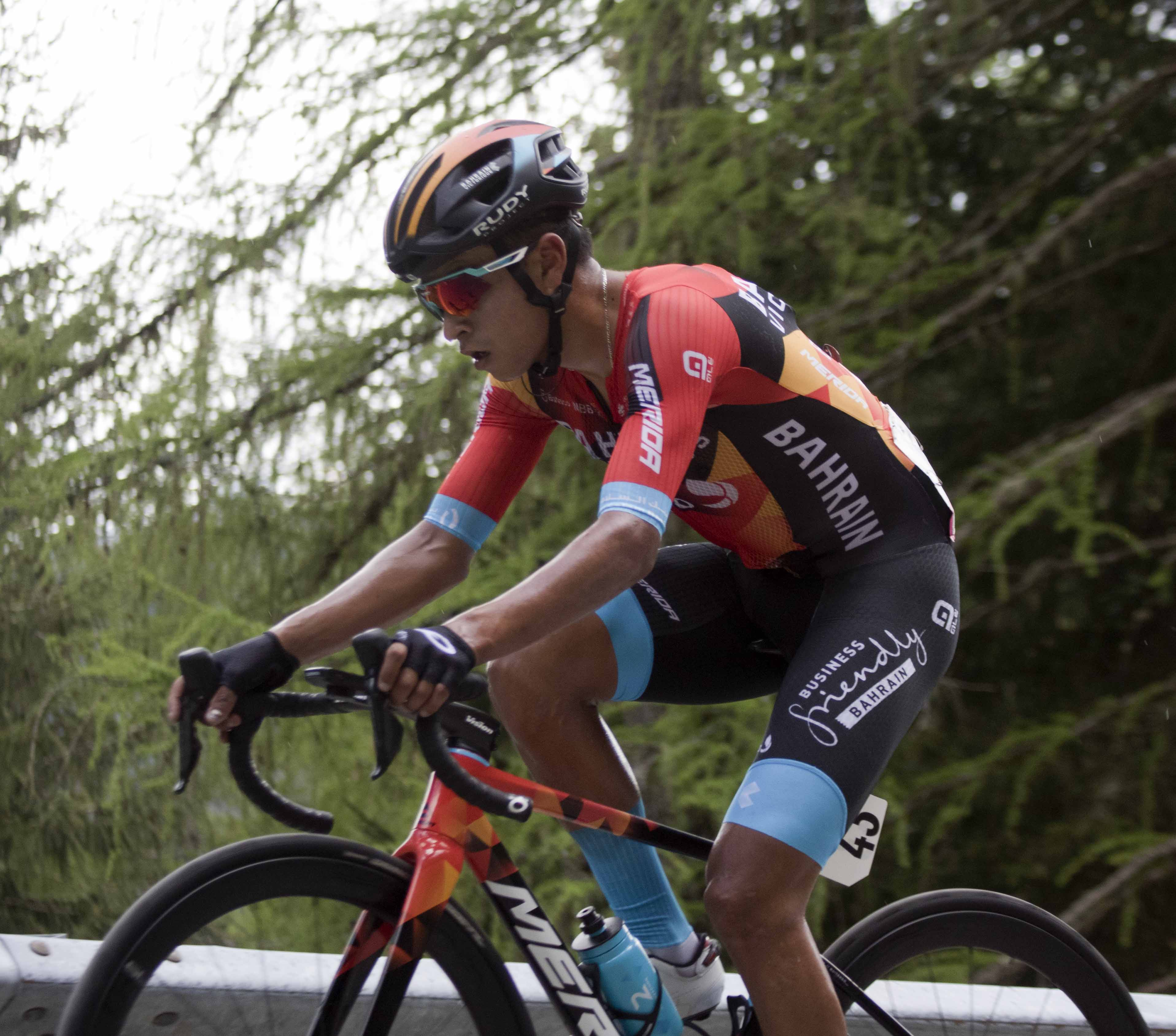
Buitrago at the 2023 Giro d'Italia

2022 started with a win in the national race Circuito Feria de Manizales, followed his first professional win: stage 2 of the Saudi Tour. Buitrago attacked with 1 kilometre to go taking Andrea Bagioli with him. The two came to the line together with Buitrago winning the sprint and taking the race lead. The next rider finished seven seconds behind the pair. He lost the race lead on stage 4 after Maxim Van Gils attacked and he was unable to follow. Buitrago maintained his second placing overall to the completion of the race.

His first Grand Tour win came at the 2022 Giro d'Italia where he won stage 17. Joining the early break, Buitrago kept up with the other riders before making his move over the top of the Monterovere and powering away solo. He stayed away taking 35 seconds on Gijs Leemreize to win the stage. His third win of the season came at the 2022 Vuelta a Burgos by winning stage 1.

The following year, he won his second Grand Tour stage: stage 19 of the Giro d'Italia in a solo victory on what was considered the "Queen Stage". He ultimately finished the race in 13th overall.

His 2024 season got off to a good start, winning stage 4 of Paris–Nice. He rode in the 2024 Tour de France, where he finished tenth overall and fourth in the young rider competition.

== Major results ==
2017
3rd Overall Vuelta del Porvenir

1st Stage 1 & 4

2019
6th Overall Giro della Valle d'Aosta
9th GP Capodarco
2021
1st Mountains classification, Settimana Ciclistica Italiana
3rd Circuito de Getxo
8th Overall Vuelta a Burgos
10th Overall Tour de Hongrie
2022 (3 pro wins)
1st Stage 17 Giro d'Italia
2nd Overall Saudi Tour

1st Stage 2

8th Overall Tour of the Alps
8th Overall Vuelta a Burgos

1st Stage 1

2023 (1)
1st Stage 19 Giro d'Italia
3rd Overall Saudi Tour

1st Young rider classification

3rd Overall Vuelta a Andalucía
3rd Liège–Bastogne–Liège
8th Overall Tour of the Alps
10th Overall Vuelta a España
2024 (1)
1st Stage 4 Paris–Nice
2nd Overall Volta a la Comunitat Valenciana

1st Young rider classification

5th La Flèche Wallonne
10th Overall Tour de France
2025 (3)
1st Overall Volta a la Comunitat Valenciana

1st Points classification
1st Stages 2 & 4

2nd Overall Tour des Alpes-Maritimes
4th Clàssica Comunitat Valenciana 1969
5th Classic Var
6th La Flèche Wallonne
2026 (1)
1st Trofeo Laigueglia
1st Mountains classification, Vuelta a España
4th Road race, National Road Championships
7th Overall Tirreno–Adriatico

=== Grand Tour general classification results timeline ===
Grand Tour	2020	2021	2022	2023	2024	2025
Giro d'Italia	—	—	12	13	—	—
Tour de France	—	—	—	—	10	40
Vuelta a España	53	—	DNF	10	—	15

Legend
—	Did not compete
DNF	Did not finish
