= Saint-Samson, Mayenne =

Saint-Samson
- Part of Pré-en-Pail-Saint-Samson
- Coat of arms
- Location of Saint-Samson
- Location within France Location within Pays de la Loire
- Coordinates: 48°28′57″N 0°11′19″W
- Country: France
- Region: Pays de la Loire
- Department: Mayenne
- Arrondissement: Mayenne
- Canton: Villaines-la-Juhel
- Commune: Pré-en-Pail-Saint-Samson
- Area^{1}: 13.49 km^{2} (5.21 sq mi)
- Elevation: 240 m (790 ft)
- Highest elevation: 318 m (1,043 ft)
- Lowest elevation: 189 m (620 ft)
- Population (2022): 418
  - Density: 31.0/km^{2} (80.3/sq mi)
- Time zone: UTC+01:00 (CET)
  - Summer (DST): UTC+02:00 (CEST)
- Postal code: 53140
- ^{1} French Land Register data, which excludes lakes, ponds, glaciers > 1 km^{2} (0.386 sq mi or 247 acres) and river estuaries.

Saint-Samson is a former commune in the Mayenne department in north-western France. On 1 January 2016, it was merged into the new commune of Pré-en-Pail-Saint-Samson. Its population was 418 in 2022.

== See also ==
- Communes of the Mayenne department
- Parc naturel régional Normandie-Maine
