= Ruben Guerreiro =

Portuguese cyclist

Rúben Guerreiro
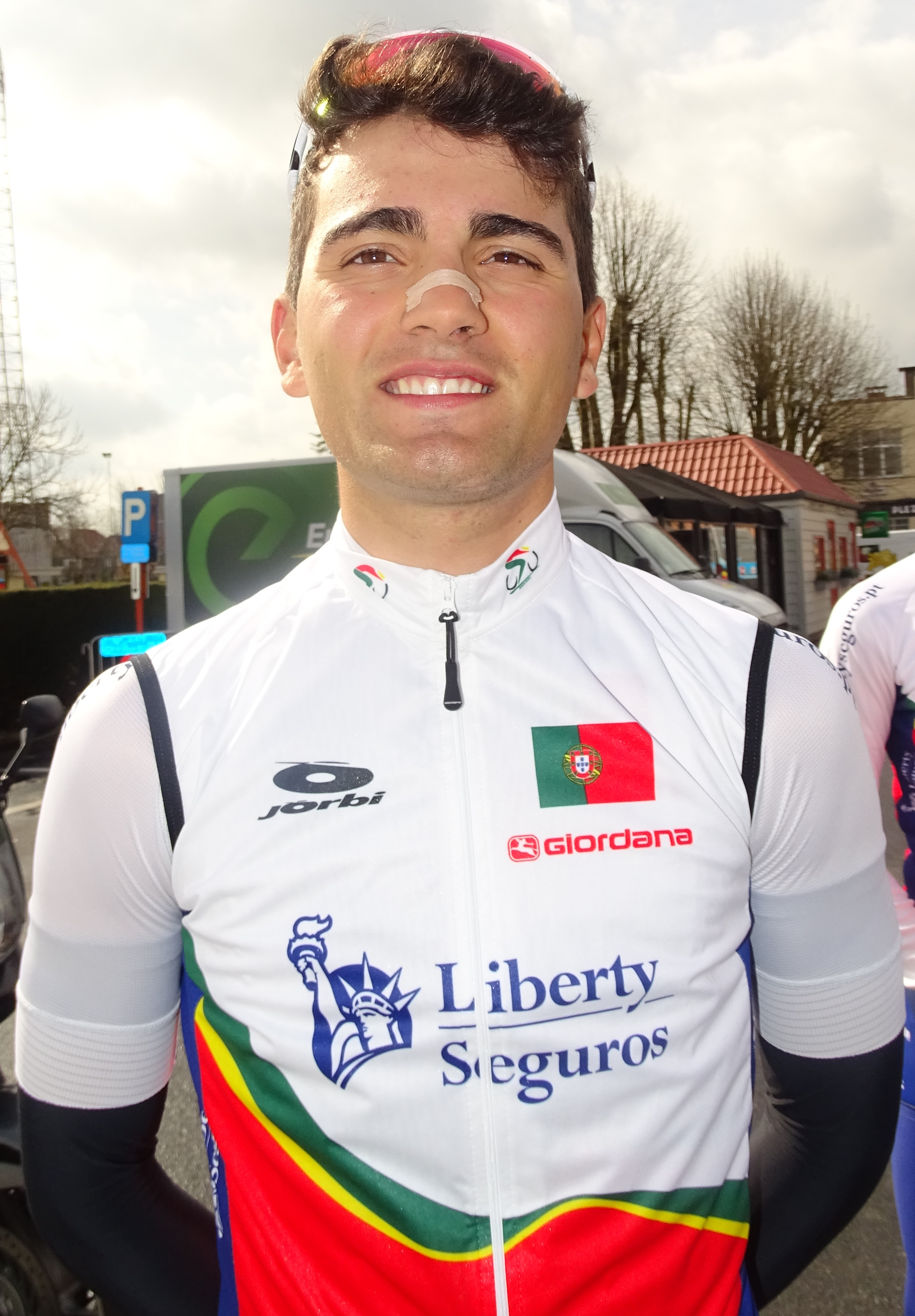
- Guerreiro in 2015

Personal information
- Full name: Rúben António Almeida Guerreiro
- Born: 6 July 1994 (age 32) Montijo, Portugal
- Height: 1.78 m (5 ft 10 in)
- Weight: 64 kg (141 lb; 10.1 st)

Cycling career
- Sport: Cycling
- Current team: Movistar Team
- Discipline: Road
- Role: Rider
- Rider type: Climber

Amateur team
- 2013–2014: Liberty Seguros–Feira–KTM

Professional teams
- 2015–2016: Axeon Cycling Team
- 2017–2018: Trek–Segafredo
- 2019: Team Katusha–Alpecin
- 2020–2022: EF Pro Cycling
- 2023–: Movistar Team

Major wins
- Grand Tours Giro d'Italia Mountains classification (2020) 1 individual stage (2020) One-day races and Classics National Road Race Championships (2017)

Rúben António Almeida Guerreiro (pronounced [ˈʁuβɛn ɡɨˈʁɐjɾu]; born 6 July 1994) is a Portuguese professional road racing cyclist, who currently rides for UCI WorldTeam Movistar Team.

== Career ==
In August 2016, Trek–Segafredo announced that they had signed Guerreiro through to 2018. He joined Team Katusha–Alpecin for the 2019 season, on a one-year contract. In August 2019, he was named in the startlist for the 2019 Vuelta a España.

In October 2020, he was named in the startlist for the 2020 Giro d'Italia. He won the ninth stage and finished the race as the leader of the mountains classification, becoming the first Portuguese rider to win a Grand Tour classification.

== Major results ==
2012
1st Road race, National Junior Road Championships
2014
1st Overall Volta a Portugal do Futuro

1st Young rider classification
1st Stage 3

2015
1st Overall GP Liberty Seguros

1st Young rider classification
1st Stage 2

National Under-23 Road Championships

2nd Road race
3rd Time trial

10th Overall Tour de Beauce
2016
1st Road race, National Under-23 Road Championships
1st Gran Premio Palio del Recioto
3rd Liège–Bastogne–Liège Espoirs
2017 (1 pro win)
1st Road race, National Road Championships
6th Bretagne Classic
9th Overall Tour of Belgium
2018
4th Overall Herald Sun Tour
5th Bretagne Classic
5th Primus Classic
6th Overall Tour of Turkey
9th Overall Tour Down Under
10th Overall Tour des Fjords
2019
8th Overall Tour Down Under
2020 (1)
Giro d'Italia

1st Mountains classification
1st Stage 9

2021
8th Overall Tour of the Alps
10th Coppa Sabatini
2022 (1)
1st Mont Ventoux Dénivelé Challenge
3rd Overall Deutschland Tour
6th Overall Vuelta a Burgos

1st Points classification

7th La Flèche Wallonne
9th Overall Critérium du Dauphiné
2023 (2)
1st Overall Saudi Tour

1st Stage 4

3rd Overall O Gran Camiño
9th Overall Route d'Occitanie
2024
5th Prueba Villafranca de Ordizia
8th Overall O Gran Camiño
9th Figueira Champions Classic
2025
9th Figueira Champions Classic
9th Tour du Finistère
10th Grand Prix du Morbihan

=== Grand Tour general classification results timeline ===
Grand Tour	2019	2020	2021	2022	2023
Giro d'Italia	—	33	DNF	—	—
Tour de France	—	—	18	DNF	DNF
Vuelta a España	17	—	—	—	DNF

Legend
—	Did not compete
DNF	Did not finish
