= Pré-en-Pail =

Commune in Mayenne, France

- Part of Pré-en-Pail-Saint-Samson
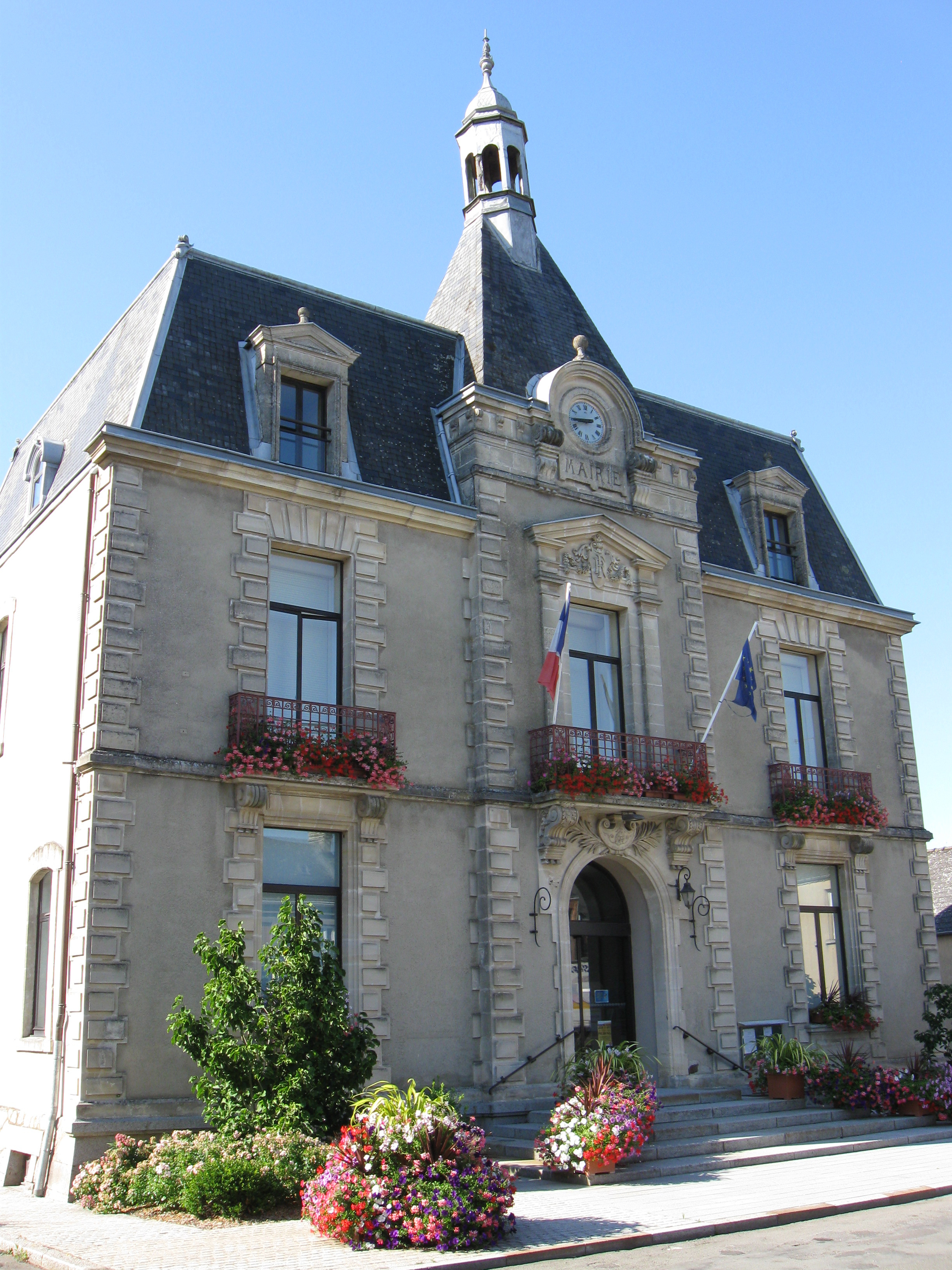
- The town hall in Pré-en-Pail

- Coat of arms
- Location of Pré-en-Pail
- Location within France Location within Pays de la Loire
- Coordinates: 48°27′37″N 0°11′58″W
- Country: France
- Region: Pays de la Loire
- Department: Mayenne
- Arrondissement: Mayenne
- Canton: Villaines-la-Juhel
- Commune: Pré-en-Pail-Saint-Samson
- Area^{1}: 44.73 km^{2} (17.27 sq mi)
- Elevation: 227 m (745 ft)
- Highest elevation: 416 m (1,365 ft)
- Lowest elevation: 174 m (571 ft)
- Population (2022): 1,882
  - Density: 42.07/km^{2} (109.0/sq mi)
- Time zone: UTC+01:00 (CET)
  - Summer (DST): UTC+02:00 (CEST)
- Postal code: 53140
- ^{1} French Land Register data, which excludes lakes, ponds, glaciers > 1 km^{2} (0.386 sq mi or 247 acres) and river estuaries.

Pré-en-Pail (French pronunciation: [pʁe ɑ̃ paj]) is a former commune in the Mayenne department in north-western France. On 1 January 2016, it was merged into the new commune of Pré-en-Pail-Saint-Samson.

== See also ==
- Communes of Mayenne
- Parc naturel régional Normandie-Maine
