= Marco Tizza =

Italian cyclist

Personal information
- Born: 6 February 1992 (age 34) Giussano, Italy
- Height: 1.73 m (5 ft 8 in)
- Weight: 58 kg (128 lb)

Cycling career
- Sport: Cycling
- Current team: Wagner Bazin WB
- Discipline: Road
- Role: Rider
- Rider type: Sprinter

Amateur teams
- 2011–2012: Casati Named
- 2013–2014: FGM–MI Impianti–De Rosa

Professional teams
- 2015: Team Idea 2010 ASD
- 2016: D'Amico–Bottecchia
- 2017: GM Europa Ovini
- 2018: Nippo–Vini Fantini–Europa Ovini
- 2019–2021: Amore & Vita–Prodir
- 2022–: Bingoal Pauwels Sauces WB

Marco Tizza (born 6 February 1992 in Giussano) is an Italian cyclist, who currently rides for UCI ProTeam Wagner Bazin WB.

== Major results ==
2014
8th Piccolo Giro di Lombardia
2015
8th Coppa della Pace
10th Poreč Trophy
2016
5th Memorial Marco Pantani
6th Boucles de l'Aulne
7th Grand Prix de Plumelec-Morbihan
8th Coppa Ugo Agostoni
8th Grand Prix Pino Cerami
10th Giro dell'Appennino
2017
4th Overall Ronde de l'Oise
5th Overall Sibiu Cycling Tour
6th Coppa Ugo Agostoni
2018
2nd Volta Limburg Classic
3rd Trofeo Matteotti
5th Giro della Toscana
9th Memorial Marco Pantani
2019
1st Stage 5 Volta a Portugal
4th Overall GP Beiras e Serra da Estrela
9th Overall Sibiu Cycling Tour

1st Stage 3

9th Grand Prix de Plumelec-Morbihan
9th Grand Prix of Aargau Canton
10th Gran Premio di Lugano
10th Tour du Doubs
2020
8th Trofeo Laigueglia
9th Overall Sibiu Cycling Tour
10th Giro dell'Appennino
2021
7th Grand Prix of Aargau Canton
9th Gran Premio di Lugano
2022
5th Overall Boucles de la Mayenne
10th Vuelta a Murcia
2023
4th Boucles de l'Aulne
7th GP Industria & Artigianato di Larciano
10th Overall Saudi Tour
2024
5th Memorial Marco Pantani
5th Trofeo Matteotti
