= Marcus Sander Hansen =

Danish bicycle racer

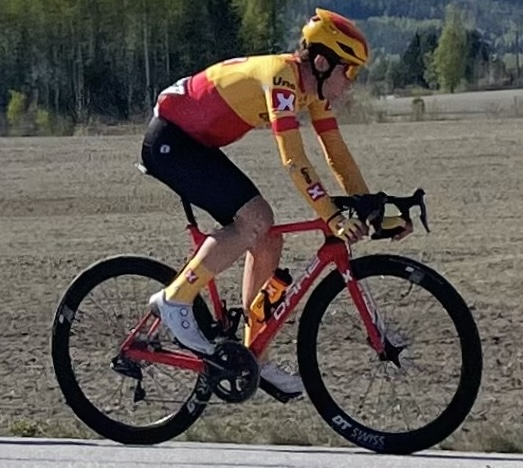
- Hansen at the 2022 Ringerike Grand Prix

Personal information
- Full name: Marcus Sander Hansen
- Born: 23 June 1995 (age 31) Greve Strand, Denmark
- Height: 1.82 m (6 ft 0 in)
- Weight: 68 kg (150 lb)

Cycling career
- Sport: Cycling
- Current team: BHS–PL Beton Bornholm
- Discipline: Road
- Role: Rider

Amateur teams
- 2014–2016: Greve Cykle Club
- 2017: Team Pythonpro.com
- 2018: Uno-X Danish Junior Team
- 2019: Team O.B. Wiik–Dan Stillads

Professional teams
- 2020–2021: BHS–PL Beton Bornholm
- 2022: Uno-X Dare Development Team
- 2023–2024: Uno-X Pro Cycling Team
- 2025–: BHS–PL Beton Bornholm

Marcus Sander Hansen (born 25 August 2000) is a Danish cyclist, who currently rides for UCI Continental team BHS–PL Beton Bornholm.

== Major results ==
2016
3rd Team pursuit, National Track Championships
2017
7th Overall Tour des Portes du Pays d'Othe

1st Young rider classification

2018
2nd Nokere Koerse voor Juniores
4th Road race, National Junior Road Championships
6th Kuurne–Brussels–Kuurne Juniors
2020
3rd Scratch, National Track Championships
2021
2nd Time trial, National Under-23 Road Championships
3rd Skive–Løbet
5th Fyen Rundt
2022
3rd PWZ Zuidenveld Tour
2024
9th Overall Tour of Estonia
2025 (2 pro wins)
1st Overall Tour of Estonia

1st Stage 2

9th Ringerike GP
