= Torresandino =

Coordinates: 41°50′N 3°54′W

- Municipality and town
- Flag Coat of arms
- Interactive map of Torresandino
- Country: Spain
- Autonomous community: Castile and León
- Province: Burgos
- Comarca: Ribera del Duero

Area
  - Total: 93 km^{2} (36 sq mi)
- Elevation: 858 m (2,815 ft)

Population (2025-01-01)
  - Total: 565
  - Density: 6.1/km^{2} (16/sq mi)
- Time zone: UTC+1 (CET)
  - Summer (DST): UTC+2 (CEST)
- Postal code: 09310
- Website: http://www.torresandino.es/

Torresandino is a municipality and town located in the province of Burgos, Castile and León, Spain. According to the 2004 census (INE), the municipality has a population of 808 inhabitants.
