= Gilles De Wilde =

Belgian cyclist

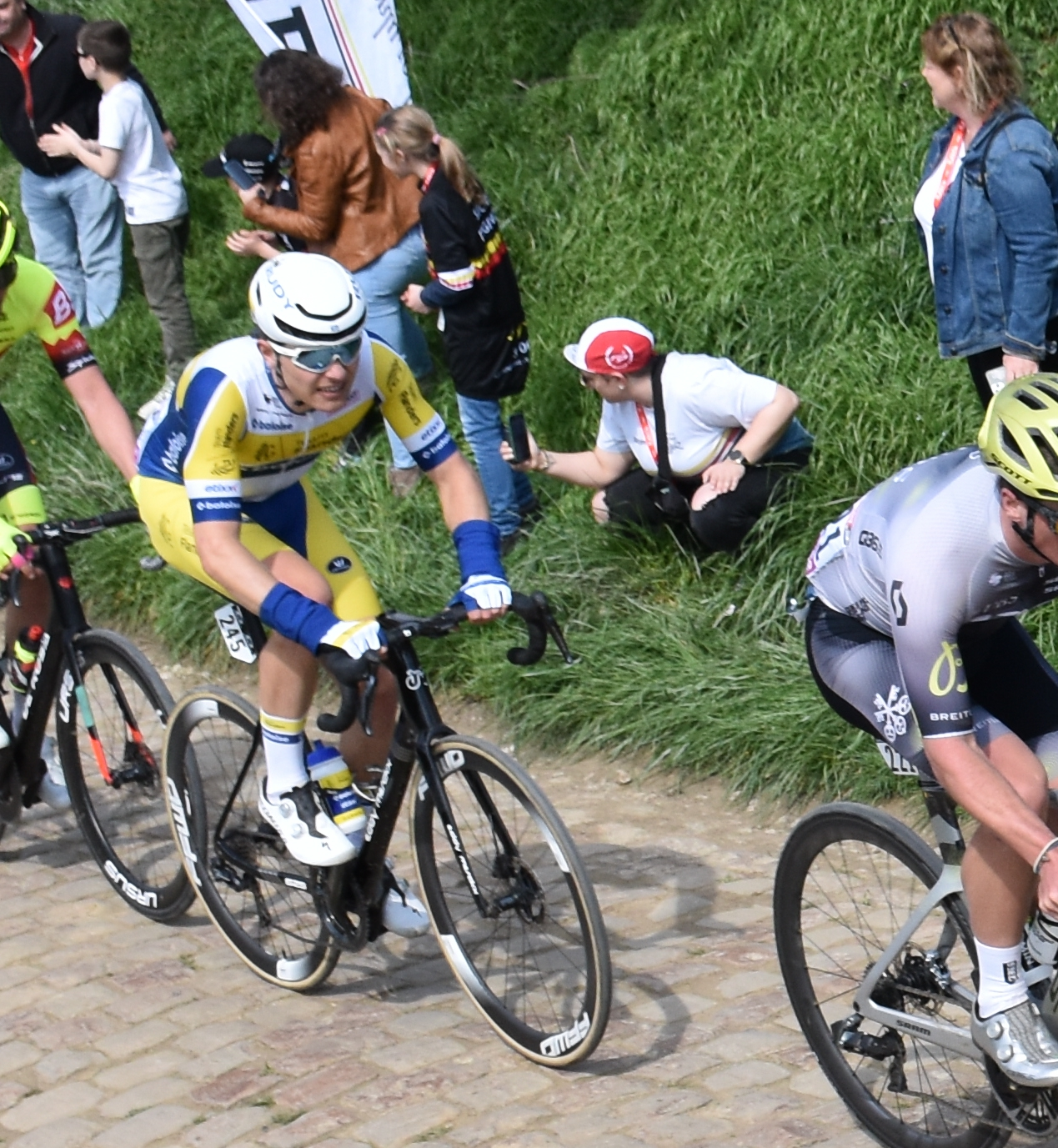
- De Wilde at the 2023 Paris–Roubaix

Personal information
- Born: 12 October 1999 (age 27)
- Height: 1.83 m (6 ft 0 in)
- Weight: 75 kg (165 lb)

Cycling career
- Sport: Cycling
- Discipline: Road
- Role: Rider

Amateur teams
- 2016–2017: VD Hauwe–Gentse Velosport
- 2018: VDM Van Durme–Michiels–Trawobo
- 2019: Home Solutions–Soenens

Professional team
- 2020–2024: Sport Vlaanderen–Baloise

Gilles De Wilde (born 12 October 1999) is a Belgian professional racing cyclist, who last rode for UCI ProTeam Team Flanders–Baloise.

== Major results ==
2017
3rd Menen–Kemmel–Menen
2019
2nd Road race, National Under-23 Road Championships
2022
1st Mountains classification, Boucles de la Mayenne
5th Brussels Cycling Classic
