= Pré-en-Pail-Saint-Samson =

- Commune
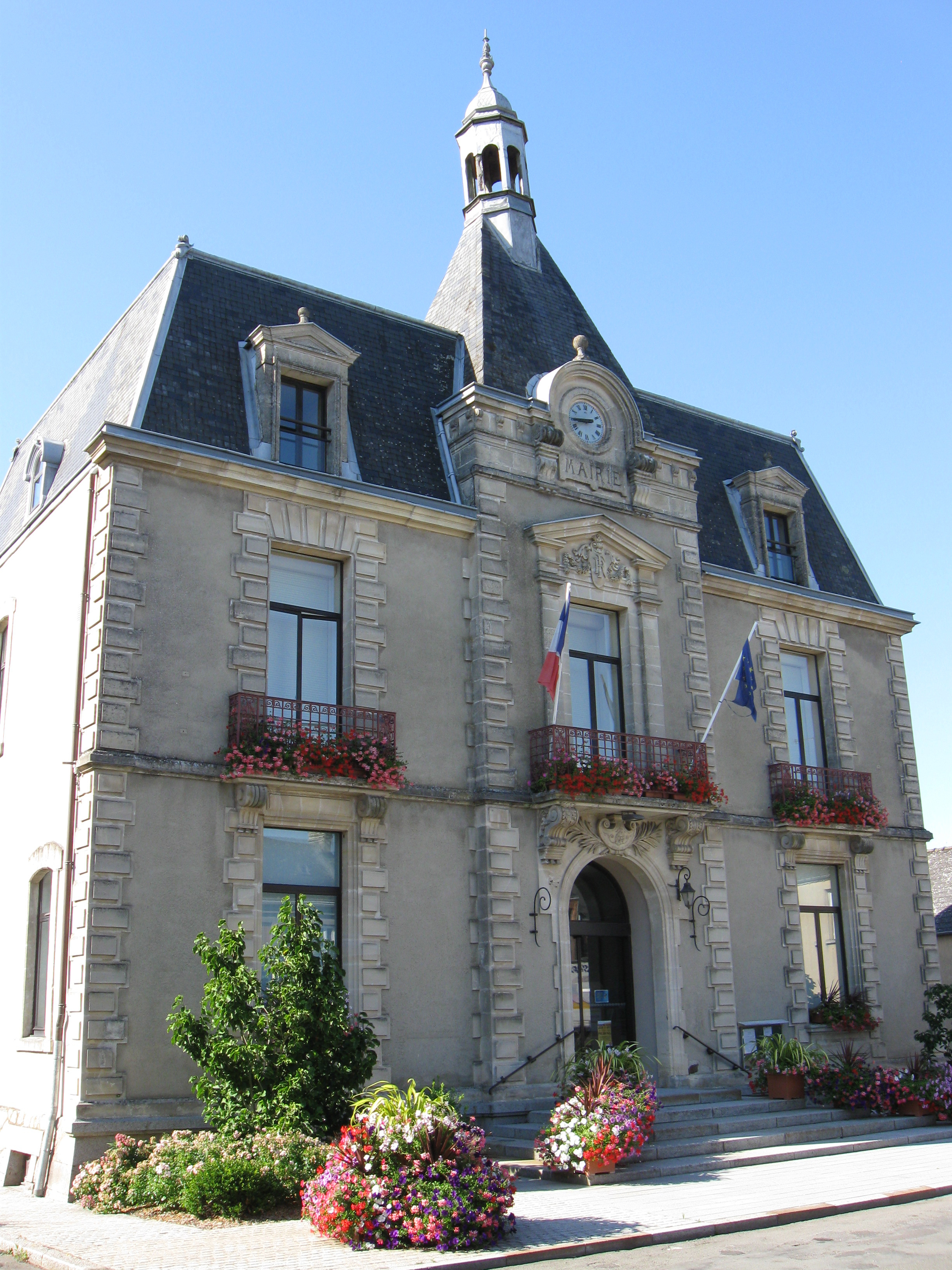
- Location of Pré-en-Pail-Saint-Samson
- Location within France Location within Pays de la Loire
- Coordinates: 48°27′36″N 0°11′49″W
- Country: France
- Region: Pays de la Loire
- Department: Mayenne
- Arrondissement: Mayenne
- Canton: Villaines-la-Juhel

Government
  - Mayor (2020–2026): Denis Geslain
- Area^{1}: 58.22 km^{2} (22.48 sq mi)
- Population (2023): 2,273
  - Density: 39.04/km^{2} (101.1/sq mi)
- Time zone: UTC+01:00 (CET)
  - Summer (DST): UTC+02:00 (CEST)
- INSEE/Postal code: 53185 /53140
- ^{1} French Land Register data, which excludes lakes, ponds, glaciers > 1 km^{2} (0.386 sq mi or 247 acres) and river estuaries.

Pré-en-Pail-Saint-Samson (French pronunciation: [pʁe ɑ̃ paj sɛ̃ sɑ̃sɔ̃]) is a commune in the department of Mayenne, western France. The municipality was established on 1 January 2016 by merger of the former communes of Pré-en-Pail and Saint-Samson.

== Geography ==
The commune is made up of the following collection of villages and hamlets, Saint-Samson, La Louvellière, La Sérardière, Pré-en-Pail-Saint-Samson and Courtoron.

The commune is located within the Normandie-Maine Regional Natural Park.

The river Mayenne flows through the commune.

== Population ==
Population data refer to the area corresponding with the commune as of January 2025.

Historical population
Year	Pop.	±% p.a.
1968	2,733	—
1975	2,822	+0.46%
1982	2,902	+0.40%
1990	2,810	−0.40%
1999	2,472	−1.41%
2007	2,520	+0.24%
2012	2,389	−1.06%
2017	2,331	−0.49%
2023	2,273	−0.42%
Source: INSEE

== Points of Interest ==
- Le belvédère du Mont des Avaloirs - Is a viewing platform built in 1994 on the highest point of the Armorican Massif at 417 metres above sea level on Mont des Avaloirs.

== Notable people ==
- Alphonse-Victor Angot - (1844 – 1917) a French historian who specialized in the history of Mayenne was vicar of the parish of Pré-en-Pail in 1869.

== See also ==
- Communes of the Mayenne department
