= Xabier Azparren =

Spanish cyclist

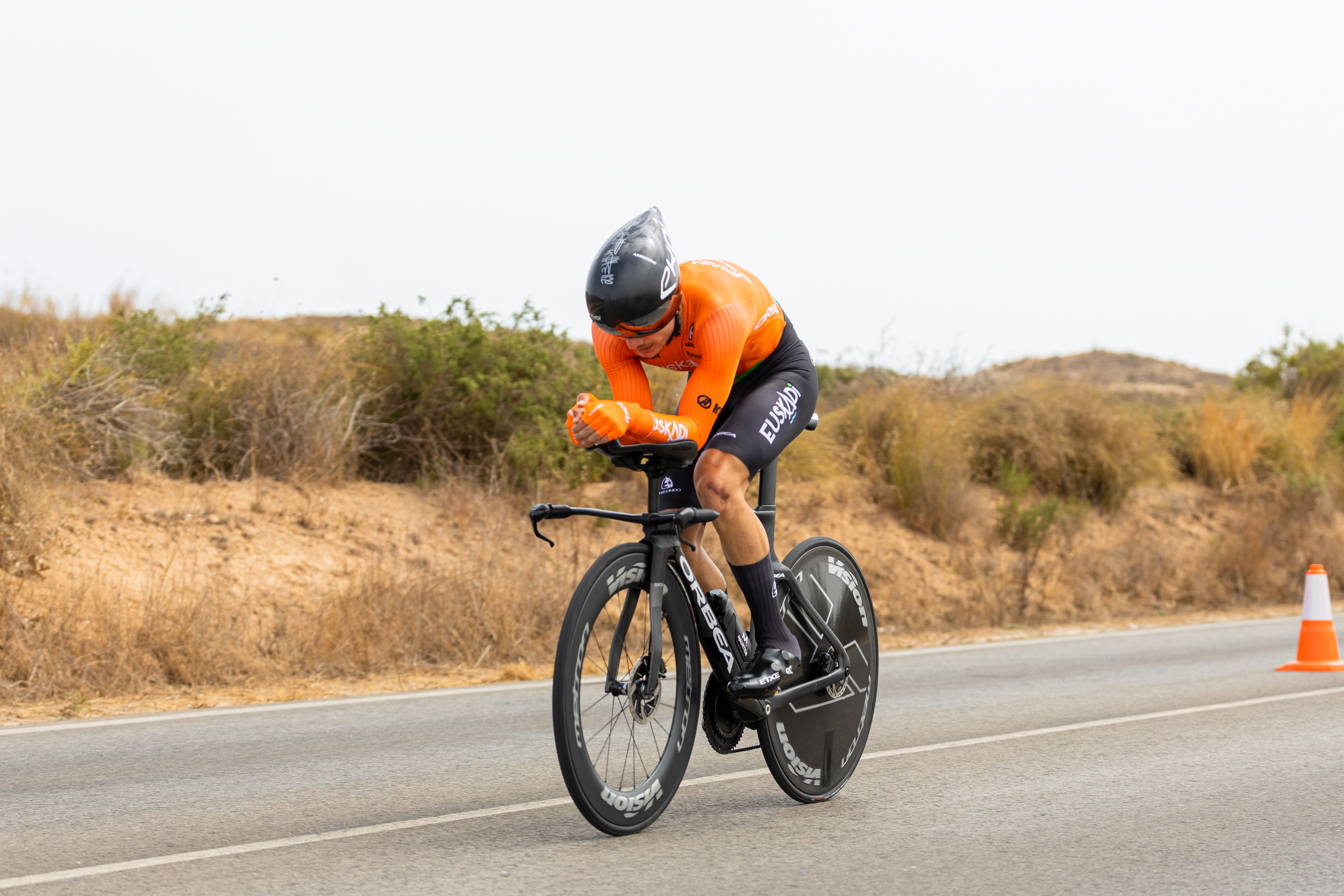
- Azparren at the 2022 Vuelta a España

Personal information
- Full name: Xabier Mikel Azparren Irurzun
- Born: 25 February 1999 (age 27) San Sebastián, Spain

Cycling career
- Sport: Cycling
- Current team: Pinarello–Q36.5 Pro Cycling Team
- Disciplines: Road; Track
- Role: Rider

Amateur teams
- 2018: Ampo–Goierriko VG
- 2019–2020: Laboral Kutxa

Professional teams
- 2021–2023: Euskaltel–Euskadi
- 2024–: Q36.5 Pro Cycling Team

Xabier Mikel Azparren Irurzun (born 25 February 1999) is a Spanish cyclist, who currently rides for UCI ProTeam Pinarello–Q36.5 Pro Cycling Team.

He turned professional in 2021 with Euskaltel–Euskadi, where he was named to their squad for the 2021 Vuelta a España.

His brother Enekoitz is also a professional cyclist for the same team.

== Major results ==
=== Road ===
2016
1st Time trial, National Junior Championships
2017
2nd Time trial, National Junior Championships
2019
1st Time trial, National Under-23 Championships
2021
9th Overall Etoile d'Or
2022
2nd Overall Volta ao Alentejo

1st Stage 2

3rd Time trial, National Championships
2023
5th Time trial, National Championships
6th Paris–Camembert
9th Overall Saudi Tour
2025
8th Chrono des Nations
2026
2nd Time trial, National Championships
9th Overall Étoile de Bessèges

==== Grand Tour general classification results timeline ====
Grand Tour	2021	2022
Giro d'Italia	—	—
Tour de France	—	—
Vuelta a España	111	94

Legend
—	Did not compete
DNF	Did not finish

=== Track ===
2016
National Junior Championships

1st Madison (with Imanol Inasa)
1st Team pursuit

2017
National Junior Championships

1st Madison (with Unai Iribar)
1st Team pursuit

2020
1st Madison, National Championships (with Illart Zuazubiskar)
