= 2026 Tour of Austria =

Austrian cycling race

2026 UCI Europe Tour

Race details
- Dates: 8-12 July 2026
- Stages: 5
- Distance: 844.8 km (524.9 mi)
- Winning time: 19h 26' 11"

Results
Jersey awarded to the overall winner	Winner	Gregor Mühlberger (AUT)	(Austria)
	Second	Kevin Vermaerke (USA)	(UAE Team Emirates XRG)
	Third	Bauke Mollema (NED)	(Lidl–Trek)
Jersey awarded to the points classification winner	Points	Kevin Vermaerke (USA)	(UAE Team Emirates XRG)
Jersey awarded to the mountains classification winner	Mountains	Piotr Pękala (POL)	(ATT Investments)
Jersey awarded to the young rider classification winner	Young rider	Andrew August (USA)	(Netcompany INEOS)
	Team	Netcompany INEOS	

The 2026 Tour of Austria is a road cycling stage race taking place between 8 and 12 July 2026 in Austria. The race is rated as a category 2.1 event on the 2026 UCI Europe Tour calendar, and is the 75th edition of the Tour of Austria.

== Teams ==
Six of the 18 UCI WorldTeams, fifteen UCI Continental teams, and the Austrian National Team make up the 22 teams that participate in the race.

UCI WorldTeams

- Alpecin–Premier Tech
- EF Education–EasyPost
- Netcompany INEOS
- Lidl–Trek
- Team Jayco–AlUla
- UAE Team Emirates XRG

UCI Continental Teams

- Hrinkow Advarics
- Team Vorarlberg
- Tirol KTM Cycling Team
- WSA KTM Graz
- ARBÖ Kärnten Sport Feld am See
- Schwingshandl Intralogistics
- ATT Investments
- Benotti Berthold
- Kasper Crypto4me
- Lucky Sport Cycling Team
- MG.K Vis Costruzioni e Ambiente
- Rembe / Rad-Net
- Team Drali–Repsol
- Team Storck–MRW BAU
- Voster Team

Other Teams

- National Team of Austria

== Route ==
Stage characteristics and winners
Stage	Date	Course	Distance	Type	Stage winner
1	8 July	Graz to Gamlitz	188 km (117 mi)	Hilly stage	Gregor Mühlberger (AUT)
2	9 July	Bad Kleinkirchheim to Großglockner, Kaiser-Franz-Josefs-Höhe	188.8 km (117.3 mi)	Mountain stage	Gregor Mühlberger (AUT)
3	10 July	Lienz to Alpendorf	189.5 km (117.7 mi)	Hilly stage	Neilson Powless (USA)
4	11 July	Steyr to Steyr	170.5 km (105.9 mi)	Hilly stage	Andrea Bagioli (ITA)
5	12 July	Langenlois to Wien	109 km (68 mi)	Flat stage	Samuel Watson (GBR)
Total			844.8 km (524.9 mi)		

== Stages ==
=== Stage 1 ===
8 July 2026 – Graz to Gamlitz, 188 km (117 mi)

Stage 1 Result
Rank	Rider	Team	Time
1	Gregor Mühlberger (AUT)	National Team	4h 21' 02"
2	Kevin Vermaerke (USA)	UAE Team Emirates XRG	+ 11"
3	Héctor Álvarez (ESP)	Lidl–Trek	+ 11"
4	Bauke Mollema (NED)	Lidl–Trek	+ 11"
5	Andrea Bagioli (ITA)	Lidl–Trek	+ 11"
6	Michael Gogl (AUT)	Alpecin–Premier Tech	+ 11"
7	Finlay Pickering (GBR)	Team Jayco–AlUla	+ 11"
8	Paul Double (GBR)	Team Jayco–AlUla	+ 11"
9	Carlos Rodríguez (ESP)	Netcompany INEOS	+ 11"
10	Andrew August (USA)	Netcompany INEOS	+ 11"

General classification after Stage 1
Rank	Rider	Team	Time
1	Gregor Mühlberger (AUT)	National Team	4h 20' 52"
2	Kevin Vermaerke (USA)	UAE Team Emirates XRG	+ 15"
3	Héctor Álvarez (ESP)	Lidl–Trek	+ 17"
4	Bauke Mollema (NED)	Lidl–Trek	+ 21"
5	Andrea Bagioli (ITA)	Lidl–Trek	+ 21"
6	Michael Gogl (AUT)	Alpecin–Premier Tech	+ 21"
7	Finlay Pickering (GBR)	Team Jayco–AlUla	+ 21"
8	Paul Double (GBR)	Team Jayco–AlUla	+ 21"
9	Carlos Rodríguez (ESP)	Netcompany INEOS	+ 21"
10	Andrew August (USA)	Netcompany INEOS	+ 21"

=== Stage 2 ===
9 July 2026 – Bad Kleinkirchheim to Großglockner, Kaiser-Franz-Josefs-Höhe, 188.8 km (117.3 mi)

Stage 2 Result
Rank	Rider	Team	Time
1	Gregor Mühlberger (AUT)	National Team	4h 46' 29"
2	James Shaw (GBR)	EF Education–EasyPost	+1' 10"
3	Kevin Vermaerke (USA)	UAE Team Emirates XRG	+1' 10"
4	Bauke Mollema (NED)	Lidl–Trek	+1' 10"
5	Carlos Rodríguez (ESP)	Netcompany INEOS	+1' 16"
6	Paul Double (GBR)	Team Jayco–AlUla	+1' 20"
7	Andrew August (USA)	Netcompany INEOS	+1' 26"
8	Toralf Rydningen Martinsen (NOR)	Team Drali–Repsol	+1' 28"
9	Finlay Pickering (GBR)	Team Jayco–AlUla	+3' 11"
10	Peter Øxenberg (DEN)	Netcompany INEOS	+3' 25"

General classification after Stage 2
Rank	Rider	Team	Time
1	Gregor Mühlberger (AUT)	National Team	9h 07' 11"
2	Kevin Vermaerke (USA)	UAE Team Emirates XRG	+1' 31"
3	Bauke Mollema (NED)	Lidl–Trek	+1' 41"
4	Carlos Rodríguez (ESP)	Netcompany INEOS	+1' 47"
5	Paul Double (GBR)	Team Jayco–AlUla	+1' 51"
6	Andrew August (USA)	Netcompany INEOS	+1' 57"
7	James Shaw (GBR)	EF Education–EasyPost	+2' 31"
8	Toralf Rydningen Martinsen (NOR)	Team Drali–Repsol	+2' 55"
9	Finlay Pickering (GBR)	Team Jayco–AlUla	+3' 42"
10	Peter Øxenberg (DEN)	Netcompany INEOS	+4' 52"

=== Stage 3 ===
10 July 2026 – Lienz to Alpendorf, 189.5 km (117.7 mi)

Stage 3 Result
Rank	Rider	Team	Time
1	Neilson Powless (USA)	EF Education–EasyPost	4h 09' 20"
2	Igor Arrieta (ESP)	UAE Team Emirates XRG	0"
3	Jan Christen (SUI)	UAE Team Emirates XRG	28"
4	Vincenzo Albanese (ITA)	EF Education–EasyPost	+1' 03"
5	António Morgado (POR)	UAE Team Emirates XRG	+1' 03"
6	Samuel Watson (GBR)	Netcompany INEOS	+1' 03"
7	Michael Gogl (AUT)	Alpecin–Premier Tech	+1' 03"
8	Asbjørn Hellemose (DEN)	Team Jayco–AlUla	+1' 03"
9	Héctor Álvarez (ESP)	Lidl–Trek	+1' 06"
10	Piotr Pękala (POL)	ATT Investments	+1' 08"

General classification after Stage 3
Rank	Rider	Team	Time
1	Gregor Mühlberger (AUT)	National Team	13h 18' 19"
2	Kevin Vermaerke (USA)	UAE Team Emirates XRG	+1' 31"
3	Bauke Mollema (NED)	Lidl–Trek	+1' 41"
4	Carlos Rodríguez (ESP)	Netcompany INEOS	+1' 47"
5	Paul Double (GBR)	Team Jayco–AlUla	+1' 51"
6	Andrew August (USA)	Netcompany INEOS	+1' 57"
7	James Shaw (GBR)	EF Education–EasyPost	+2' 31"
8	Toralf Rydningen Martinsen (NOR)	Team Drali–Repsol	+2' 55"
9	Finlay Pickering (GBR)	Team Jayco–AlUla	+3' 42"
10	Igor Arrieta (ESP)	UAE Team Emirates XRG	+3' 54"

=== Stage 4 ===
11 July 2026 – Steyr to Steyr, 170.5 km (105.9 mi)

Stage 4 Result
Rank	Rider	Team	Time
1	Andrea Bagioli (ITA)	Lidl–Trek	3h 54' 51"
2	Kevin Vermaerke (USA)	UAE Team Emirates XRG	0"
3	Andrew August (USA)	Netcompany INEOS	0"
4	James Shaw (GBR)	EF Education–EasyPost	0"
5	Jermaine Zemke (GER)	Rembe / Rad-Net	0"
6	Bauke Mollema (NED)	Lidl–Trek	0"
7	Paul Double (GBR)	Team Jayco–AlUla	0"
8	Carlos Rodríguez (ESP)	Netcompany INEOS	0"
9	Héctor Álvarez (ESP)	Lidl–Trek	0"
10	Finlay Pickering (GBR)	Team Jayco–AlUla	0"

General classification after Stage 4
Rank	Rider	Team	Time
1	Gregor Mühlberger (AUT)	National Team	17h 13' 10"
2	Kevin Vermaerke (USA)	UAE Team Emirates XRG	+1' 25"
3	Bauke Mollema (NED)	Lidl–Trek	+1' 40"
4	Carlos Rodríguez (ESP)	Netcompany INEOS	+1' 47"
5	Paul Double (GBR)	Team Jayco–AlUla	+1' 51"
6	Andrew August (USA)	Netcompany INEOS	+1' 51"
7	James Shaw (GBR)	EF Education–EasyPost	+2' 31"
8	Toralf Rydningen Martinsen (NOR)	Team Drali–Repsol	+3' 28"
9	Finlay Pickering (GBR)	Team Jayco–AlUla	+3' 42"
10	Asbjørn Hellemose (DEN)	Team Jayco–AlUla	+4' 42"

=== Stage 5 ===
12 July 2026 – Langenlois to Wien, 109 km (68 mi)

Stage 5 Result
Rank	Rider	Team	Time
1	Samuel Watson (GBR)	Netcompany INEOS	2h 13' 01"
2	Vincenzo Albanese (ITA)	EF Education–EasyPost	0"
3	Patrick Konrad (AUT)	Lidl–Trek	0"
4	Héctor Álvarez (ESP)	Lidl–Trek	0"
5	Hamish McKenzie (NZL)	Team Jayco–AlUla	0"
6	Andrea Bagioli (ITA)	Lidl–Trek	0"
7	Tibor Del Grosso (NED)	Alpecin–Premier Tech	0"
8	Fabian Steininger (AUT)	Schwingshandl Intralogistics	0"
9	António Morgado (POR)	UAE Team Emirates XRG	0"
10	Jermaine Zemke (GER)	Rembe / Rad-Net	0"

General classification after Stage 5
Rank	Rider	Team	Time
1	Gregor Mühlberger (AUT)	National Team	19h 26' 11"
2	Kevin Vermaerke (USA)	UAE Team Emirates XRG	+1' 25"
3	Bauke Mollema (NED)	Lidl–Trek	+1' 40"
4	Carlos Rodríguez (ESP)	Netcompany INEOS	+1' 47"
5	Paul Double (GBR)	Team Jayco–AlUla	+1' 51"
6	Andrew August (USA)	Netcompany INEOS	+1' 51"
7	James Shaw (GBR)	EF Education–EasyPost	+2' 31"
8	Toralf Rydningen Martinsen (NOR)	Team Drali–Repsol	+3' 28"
9	Finlay Pickering (GBR)	Team Jayco–AlUla	+3' 42"
10	Asbjørn Hellemose (DEN)	Team Jayco–AlUla	+4' 42"

== Classification leadership table ==
Classification leadership by stage
Stage	Winner	General classification	Points classification	Mountains classification	Young rider classification	Team classification
1	Gregor Mühlberger	Gregor Mühlberger	Gregor Mühlberger	Tobias Nolde	Héctor Álvarez	Lidl–Trek
2	Gregor Mühlberger	Gregor Mühlberger	Gregor Mühlberger	Gregor Mühlberger	Andrew August	Netcompany INEOS
3	Neilson Powless	Gregor Mühlberger	Gregor Mühlberger	Gregor Mühlberger	Andrew August	Netcompany INEOS
4	Andrea Bagioli	Gregor Mühlberger	Kevin Vermaerke	Piotr Pękala	Andrew August	Netcompany INEOS
5	Samuel Watson	Gregor Mühlberger	Kevin Vermaerke	Piotr Pękala	Andrew August	Netcompany INEOS
Final		Gregor Mühlberger	Kevin Vermaerke	Piotr Pękala	Andrew August	Netcompany INEOS
