= Aleix Espargaró =

Spanish motorcycle racer (born 1989)

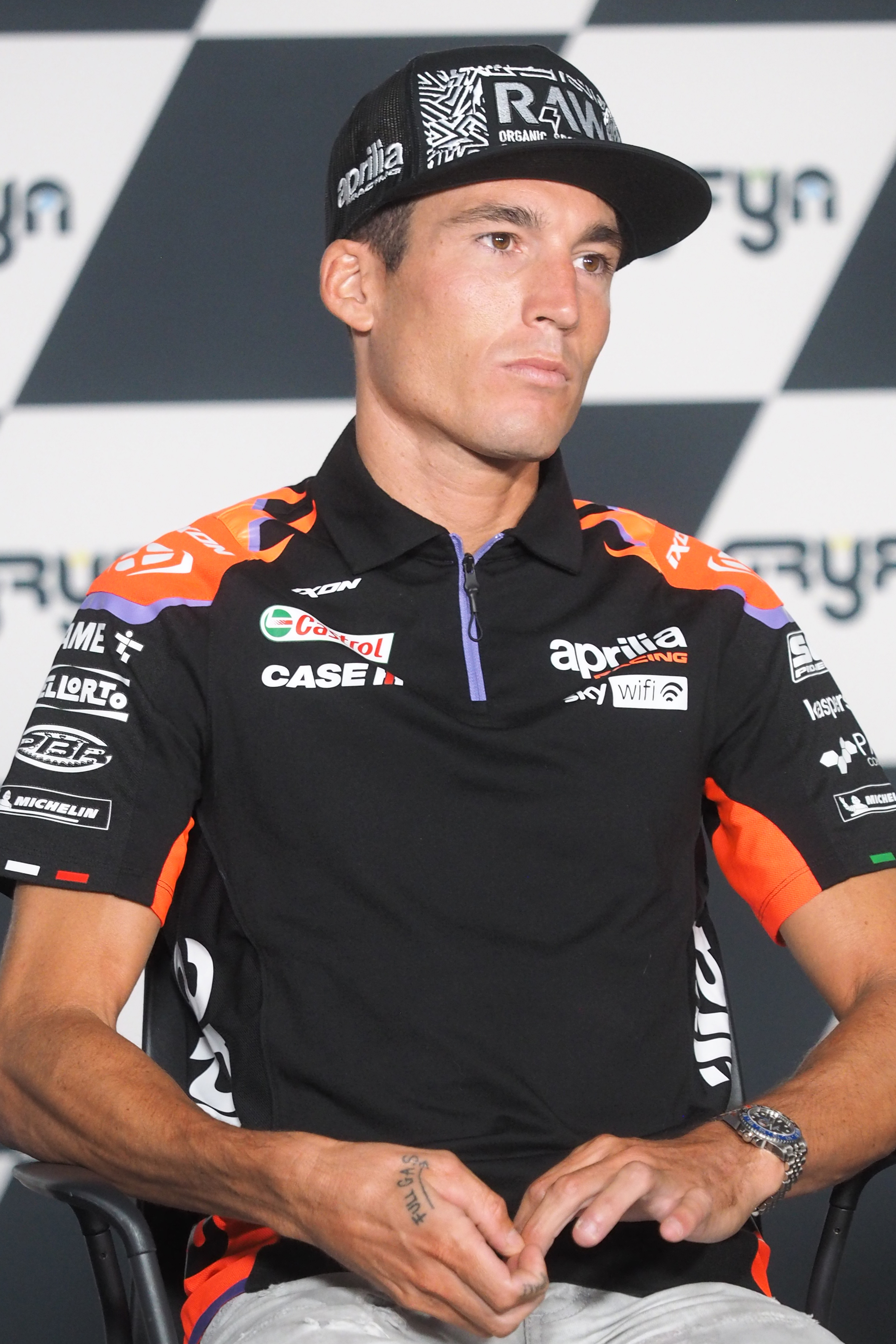
- Espargaró at the 2022 San Marino Grand Prix
- Nationality: Spanish
- Born: 30 July 1989 (age 37); Granollers, Spain
- Current team: Honda HRC Test Team
- Bike number: 41
Motorcycle racing career statistics
MotoGP World Championship
Active years	2009–2010; 2012–2025
Manufacturers	Ducati (2009–2010); ART (2012–2013); Forward Yamaha (2014); Suzuki (2015–2016); Aprilia (2017–2024); Honda (2025)
Championships	0
2025 championship position	28th (0 pts)
Starts / Wins / Podiums / Poles / F. laps / Points; 260 / 3 / 11 / 7 / 5 / 1484
Moto2 World Championship
Active years	2011
Manufacturers	Pons Kalex
Championships	0
2011 championship position	12th (76 pts)
Starts / Wins / Podiums / Poles / F. laps / Points; 17 / 0 / 1 / 0 / 0 / 76
250cc World Championship
Active years	2006–2009
Manufacturers	Honda (2006); Aprilia (2007–2009)
Championships	0
2009 championship position	20th (22 pts)
Starts / Wins / Podiums / Poles / F. laps / Points; 44 / 0 / 0 / 0 / 0 / 181
125cc World Championship
Active years	2004–2006
Manufacturers	Honda
Championships	0
2006 championship position	NC (0 pts)
Starts / Wins / Podiums / Poles / F. laps / Points; 23 / 0 / 0 / 0 / 0 / 36

Aleix Espargaró Villà (Catalan pronunciation: [əˈleʃ əspəɾɣəˈɾo βiˈʎa]; born 30 July 1989) is a Spanish former Grand Prix motorcycle racer. He was the Spanish 2004 FIM CEV 125cc International Champion and has competed since 2017 in the MotoGP class using Aprilia machines. He retired from Grand Prix racing at the end of the 2024 season and signed as a test rider for Honda Racing Corporation. He decided to become a cyclist with the United States team, Lidl-Trek, making his debut in the world of cycling at the 2025 Tour of Austria.

== Career ==
Espargaró was born in Granollers, Spain. Aleix is the older brother of fellow MotoGP rider Pol Espargaro. Espargaró had his breakthrough in the 2014 MotoGP season with Forward Yamaha finishing seventh in the championship with the highlight being a second-place finish in Aragon. This earned him a move to the factory Suzuki team in 2015. In 2017, he switched to Aprilia Racing Team Gresini.

=== 125cc International Championship ===
In 2004, Espargaró won the Spanish FIM CEV International Championship 125 cc class with one win, two podiums at Circuito del Jarama and 88 total points.

=== 250cc World Championship ===
In 2006, Espargaró moved to the 250cc class of Grand Prix Motorcycle World Championship racing mid-season, from the 125cc class. After Sebastian Porto ended his career, Martin Cardenas replaced Porto, and Espargaró took Cardenas' spot.

=== MotoGP World Championship ===
For 2009, Espargaró was offered a deal with the Italian Campetella Racing team but they withdrew, leaving him without a permanent ride, but had two substitute appearances at Assen and Sachsenring for the Balatonring Team. He also acted as a Moto2 development rider.

==== Pramac Racing (2009–2010) ====
On 19 August 2009, it was announced Espargaró would race for Pramac Racing in MotoGP in Indianapolis and Misano. He replaced Mika Kallio, who in turn replaced Casey Stoner at the Ducati works team.

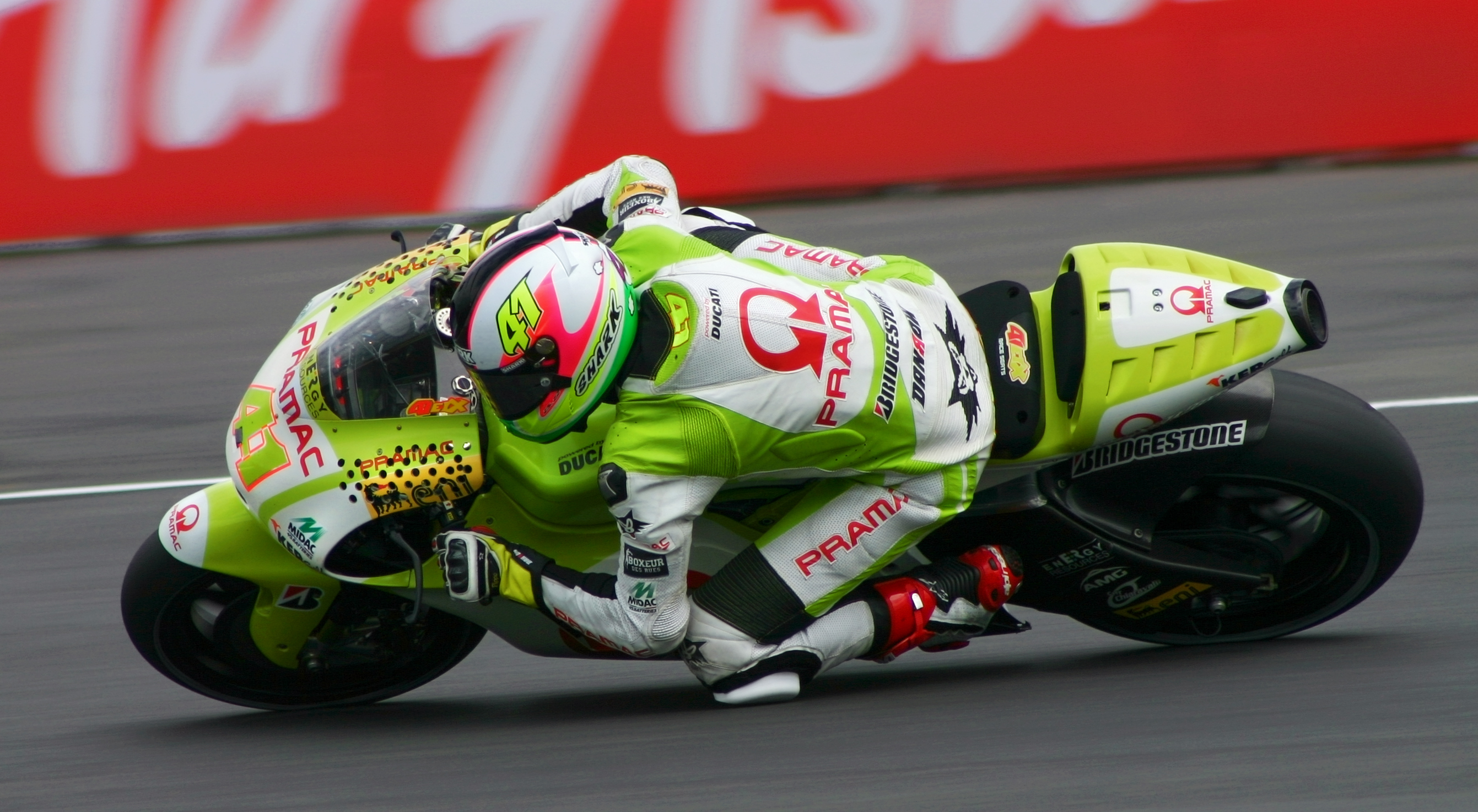
Espargaró at the 2010 British Grand Prix

On 6 October 2009, it was announced that Espargaró had signed an agreement with Pramac Ducati to race in the 2010 MotoGP Championship. He replaced Niccolò Canepa in the team. He also replaced the injured Canepa for the last two races of the 2009 season in Sepang and Valencia.

In 2010, Espargaró remained in the same team with Mika Kallio as his teammate. During the German GP, Espargaró was involved in an incident with Álvaro Bautista and Randy de Puniet where he sustained a fracture of the vertebra and a small cut on the knee. His best result was two eighth places at Italy and Australia. He ended the season in 14th place with 65 points.

=== Moto2 World Championship ===
==== Pons HP40 (2011) ====
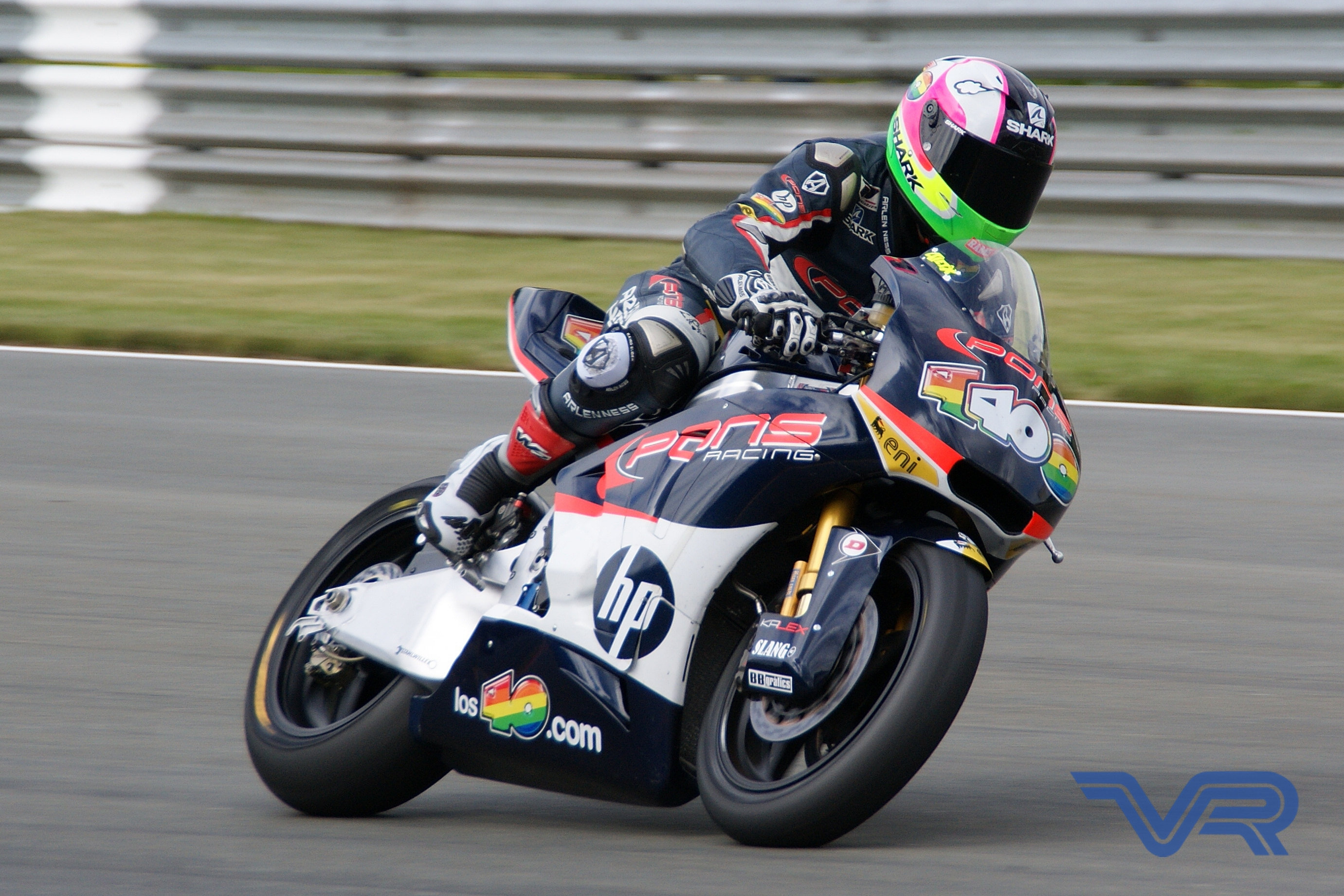
Espargaró at the 2011 German Grand Prix

In 2011, Espargaró moved to Moto2 with the Pons HP40 team, his teammate was Axel Pons. He got a podium in Catalunya and ended the season in 12th place with 76 points.

=== Return to MotoGP ===
==== Power Electronics Aspar (2012–2013) ====
Espargaró returned to the MotoGP class, his teammate was Randy De Puniet. His best result was an eighth place in Malaysia and ended the season in 12th place with 74 points, making him the highest-placed CRT rider for the 2012 season.

In 2013, Espargaró remained on the same team. He obtained a best result of eighth place achieved at Italy, Catalonia, Netherlands and Germany and finished the season in 11th place with 93 points, once again the highest-placed CRT rider.

==== NGM Forward Racing (2014) ====
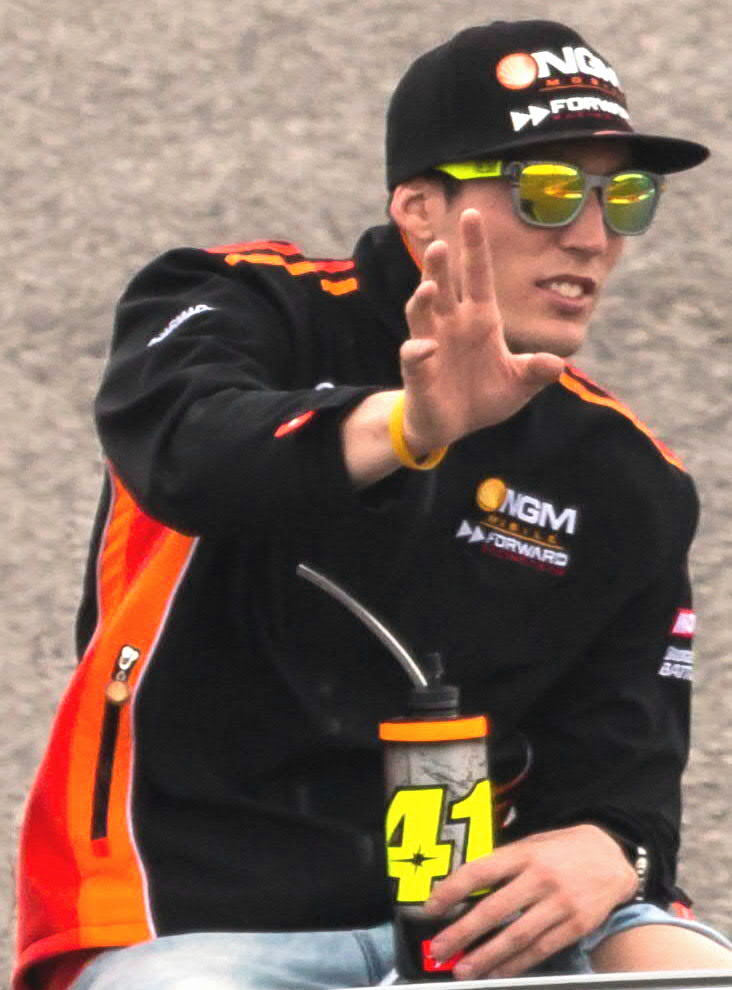
Espargaró at the 2014 Grand Prix of the Americas

In 2014, Espargaró moved to the Forward Racing team riding a Yamaha Forward with CRT specifications. His teammate was Colin Edwards. He scored his first podium in MotoGP finishing second at the Aragon GP. He ended the season in seventh place with 126 points, making him the best of the riders equipped with CRT bikes for the third time in a row. He recorded his first-ever pole position at the Dutch TT at Assen, coming in his 150th Grand Prix weekend.

==== Team Suzuki Ecstar (2015–2016) ====
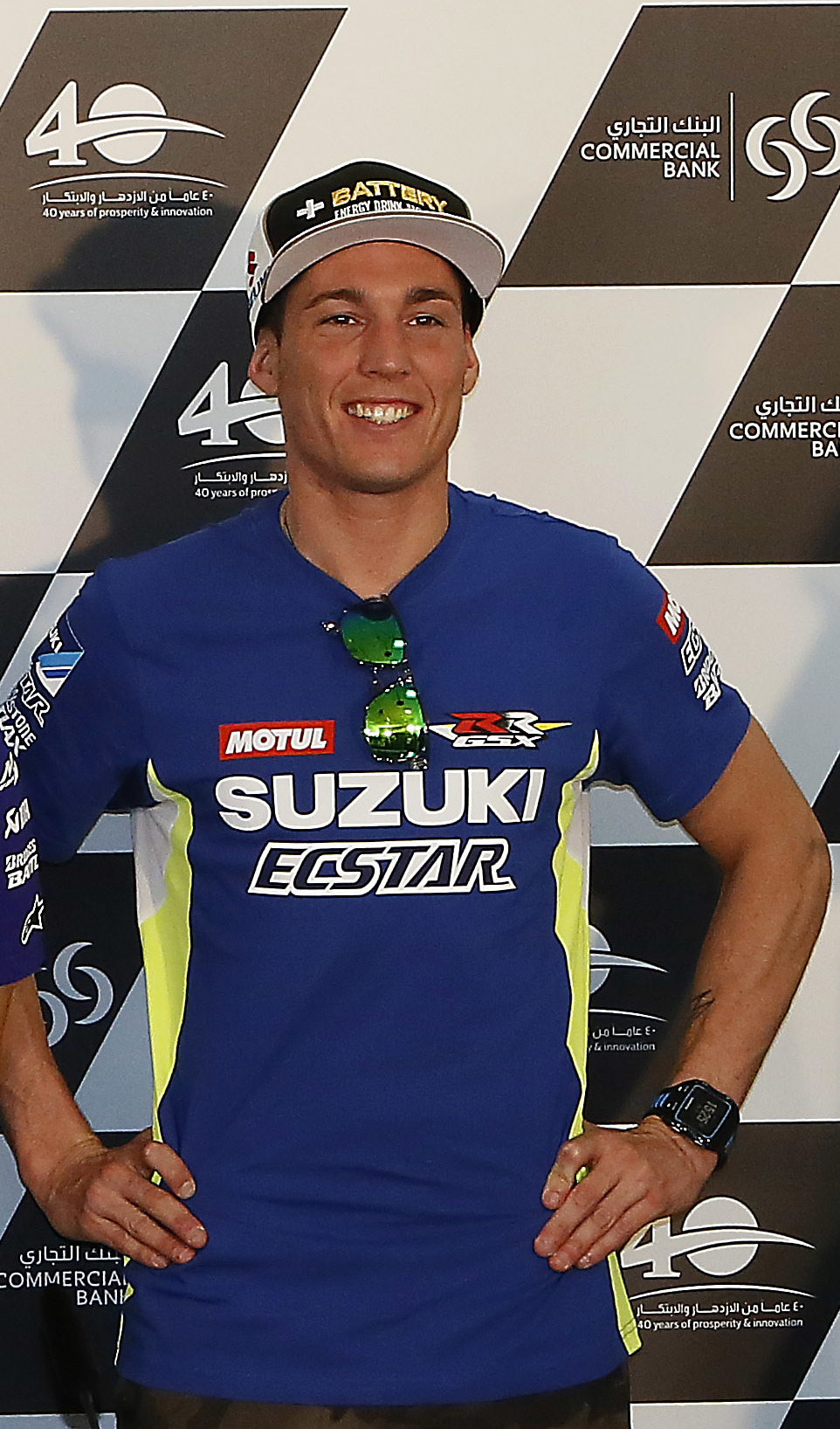
Espargaró at the 2015 Qatar Grand Prix

In 2015, after dominating the Open Class – previously known as CRT – Espargaró signed for the Suzuki works team to ride their new GSX-RR from 2015. His teammate was Maverick Viñales. He managed to get the second pole position of his career at the Catalonian GP, making it Suzuki's first pole since 2007. He ended the season in eleventh place with 105 points.

In 2016, Espargaró remained in the same team, achieving fourth place in Japan as his best result and finishing the season in 11th place with 93 points.

==== Aprilia Racing (2017–2024) ====
In 2017, Espargaró switched to Aprilia Racing Team Gresini, his teammate was Sam Lowes. He got two sixth places as his best result at Qatar and Aragon, ending the season in 15th place with 62 points. He was forced to miss the Malaysian Grand Prix due to a fracture of his left arm in the previous Grand Prix.

In 2018, Espargaró's teammate was Scott Redding. His best result was a sixth place in Aragon and ended the season in 17th place with 44 points. He was forced to miss the German Grand Prix due to an injury sustained in warm up.

In 2019, Espargaró's teammate was Andrea Iannone. His best result was a seventh place in Aragon and he finished the season in 14th place with 63 points.

In 2020 he remained with Aprilia. His best result was an eighth place in Portugal, and he ended the season in 17th place, with 42 points.

For the 2021 season, Espargaró remained with Aprilia, and his teammate at the beginning of the season was Lorenzo Savadori. The Aprilia bike immediately proved to be much more competitive, so much so that Espargaró was able to finish frequently in the top-ten. In particular, at Silverstone, after starting from the second row, he finished the race in third position, giving Aprilia their first podium in MotoGP. This was Espargaró's career second podium in MotoGP, after Aragon in 2014, a wait of almost seven years. His teammate from the Aragon race and on, was Yamaha outcast Maverick Vinales for the rest of the season.

In the third round of the 2022 campaign, Espargaró won the Argentine Republic Grand Prix from pole position. This was his first win in any class in Grand Prix motorcycling, Aprilia's first MotoGP win, as well as his first time leading the riders' championship. He scored four successive podium finishes during the European rounds, and was en route to a fifth successive podium until he dropped to fifth place after mistaking the last lap for the race finish in his home race at Barcelona. He returned to the podium at MotorLand Aragon, and remained a championship contender until the Malaysian Grand Prix, as his title challenge faltered during the flyaway rounds of 2022, notably at Motegi as incorrect bike settings forced him to start from the pitlane and finish in 16th despite qualifying ahead of his main rivals for the championship, Fabio Quartararo and Francesco Bagnaia. Lacklustre results at Sepang and Valencia ultimately meant Espargaró finished in fourth place in the championship, nevertheless his highest ever placing in the MotoGP world championship.

On 26 May 2022, Espargaró signed a contract extension with the team for 2023 and 2024, still teaming up with Maverick Viñales.

In the first rounds of 2023, Espargaró struggled with form, but achieved race wins at Silverstone and Barcelona. He led teammate Maverick Viñales to the first ever 1-2 finish for the factory Aprilia team in MotoGP in the latter. These results elevated Espargaró to 5th in the rider standings. However, during the last rounds of 2023, Espargaró and Aprilia were mediocre in form, with him suffering a fractured left fibula during the sprint race at the Qatar Grand Prix after a crash with Miguel Oliveira. Espargaró ended the year in sixth, two points ahead of his teammate.

==== Retirement from motorcycle racing ====
On 23 May 2024 at the Catalan Grand Prix, Espargaró held a press conference where he announced he would officially retire from regular competition at the end of the 2024 season. He won the sprint race on the same weekend as his announcement of retirement from full-time Grand Prix racing was made, and featured on the sprint race podium in third at Spielberg and Silverstone. However, he did not finish on the podium in any feature races in 2024, ending his last full-time season 11th in the world championship. Espargaró was replaced by his long time friend and defending world champion Jorge Martín at Aprilia for 2025.

==== Honda HRC test rider (2025–) ====
On 2 July 2024, Espargaró and Honda announced he would be joining the Japanese manufacturer as a test rider from the 2025 season. He made two wildcard appearances, at the Spanish and British Grands Prix.

It was midway through the season that Honda appeared to be experiencing a genuine rider crisis in several competitions. A few days before the Hungarian GP, Espargaró, who was slated to replace Somkiat Chantra in LCR Honda Idemitsu, suffered a cycling injury.

=== Tour of Austria ===
Joining the United States team, Lidl-Trek, Espargaró will make his debut at the 2025 Tour of Austria, a stage cycling race which will be held from July 9 to July 13, 2025. The five-day race will cover a mountainous route, finishing in the city of Feldkirch, Austria.

Before fully committing to the world of cycling, Espargaró returned to the MotoGP circuit at least one last time. He competed as a wildcard rider with Honda in the 2025 Dutch GP at the Assen Circuit, where he finished last in 16th position.

== Personal life ==
Espargaró's younger brother Pol is also a Grand Prix motorcycle racer, currently reserve test rider for Red Bull KTM Factory Racing in MotoGP. They competed alongside each other in Moto2 in 2011, and both have been competing in MotoGP since 2014.

Espargaró is married to Laura Montero. They dated for about eight years before marrying on August 23, 2014, in Barcelona. The couple had twins in 2018: their daughter Mia, and their son Max.

Espargaró is a fan of FC Barcelona and its former player Bojan, whom he finally met at the Gran Premi De Catalunya in 2012. He is noted as being a fan of Japanese cuisine, and owns restaurants located in Andorra.

== Career statistics ==
=== FIM CEV International Championship ===
==== Races by year ====
(key)

Year	Class	Bike	Team	1	2	3	4	5	6	7	Pos	Pts
2003	125cc	Honda	R.A.C.C	CAT; 12	JAR; 6	ALB1; Ret	JER1; 11	ALB2; 7	VAL; 16	JER2; 11	11th	33
2004	125cc	Honda	R.A.C.C	CAT; 7	JAR; 1	ALB1; 3	JER1; 4	ALB2; 12	VAL; 8	JER2; 11	1st	88

=== Grand Prix motorcycle racing ===
==== By season ====
Season	Class	Motorcycle	Team	Race	Win	Podium	Pole	FLap	Pts	Plcd
2004	125cc	Honda	Racc Caja Madrid	1	0	0	0	0	0	NC
2005	125cc	Honda	Seedorf RC3 – Tiempo Holidays	16	0	0	0	0	36	16th
2006	125cc	Honda	Wurth Honda BQR	6	0	0	0	0	0	NC
2006	250cc	Honda	Wurth Honda BQR	9	0	0	0	0	20	19th
2007	250cc	Aprilia	Blusens Aprilia	17	0	0	0	0	47	15th
2008	250cc	Aprilia	Lotus Aprilia	16	0	0	0	0	92	12th
2009	250cc	Aprilia	Balatonring Team	2	0	0	0	0	22	20th
2009	MotoGP	Ducati	Pramac Racing	4	0	0	0	0	16	18th
2010	MotoGP	Ducati	Pramac Racing	18	0	0	0	0	65	14th
2011	Moto2	Pons Kalex	Pons HP40	17	0	1	0	0	76	12th
2012	MotoGP	ART	Power Electronics Aspar	18	0	0	0	0	74	12th
2013	MotoGP	ART	Power Electronics Aspar	18	0	0	0	0	93	11th
2014	MotoGP	Forward Yamaha	NGM Forward Racing	18	0	1	1	0	126	7th
2015	MotoGP	Suzuki	Team Suzuki Ecstar	18	0	0	1	0	105	11th
2016	MotoGP	Suzuki	Team Suzuki Ecstar	18	0	0	0	0	93	11th
2017	MotoGP	Aprilia	Aprilia Racing Team Gresini	17	0	0	0	0	62	15th
2018	MotoGP	Aprilia	Aprilia Racing Team Gresini	17	0	0	0	0	44	17th
2019	MotoGP	Aprilia	Aprilia Racing Team Gresini	19	0	0	0	0	63	14th
2020	MotoGP	Aprilia	Aprilia Racing Team Gresini	14	0	0	0	0	42	17th
2021	MotoGP	Aprilia	Aprilia Racing Team Gresini	18	0	1	0	0	120	8th
2022	MotoGP	Aprilia	Aprilia Racing	20	1	6	2	2	212	4th
2023	MotoGP	Aprilia	Aprilia Racing	20	2	3	1	2	206	6th
2024	MotoGP	Aprilia	Aprilia Racing	18	0	0	2	1	163	11th
2025	MotoGP	Honda	Honda HRC Test Team	4	0	0	0	0	0	28th
2025	MotoGP	Honda	Honda HRC Castrol	1	0	0	0	0	0	28th
2026	MotoGP	Honda	Honda HRC Castrol	0	0	0	0	0	0*	NC*
Total				**344**	**3**	**12**	**7**	**5**	**1777**	

==== By class ====
Class	Seasons	1st GP	1st Pod	1st Win	Race	Win	Podiums	Pole	FLap	Pts	WChmp
125cc	2004–2006	2004 Valencia			23	0	0	0	0	36	0
250cc	2006–2009	2006 Netherlands			44	0	0	0	0	181	0
Moto2	2011	2011 Qatar	2011 Catalunya		17	0	1	0	0	76	0
MotoGP	2009–2010, 2012–present	2009 Indianapolis	2014 Aragon	2022 Argentina	260	3	11	7	5	1484	0
Total	2004–present				**344**	**3**	**12**	**7**	**5**	**1777**	**0**

==== Races by year ====
(key) (Races in bold indicate pole position, races in italics indicate fastest lap)

Year	Class	Bike	1	2	3	4	5	6	7	8	9	10	11	12	13	14	15	16	17	18	19	20	21	22	Pos	Pts
2004	125cc	Honda	RSA	SPA	FRA	ITA	CAT	NED	RIO	GER	GBR	CZE	POR	JPN	QAT	MAL	AUS	VAL; 24							NC	0
2005	125cc	Honda	SPA; 14	POR; 16	CHN; 7	FRA; 12	ITA; 17	CAT; 15	NED; Ret	GBR; Ret	GER; 9	CZE; 13	JPN; 12	MAL; 15	QAT; 18	AUS; 17	TUR; 17	VAL; 11							16th	36
2006	125cc	Honda	SPA; Ret	QAT; 17	TUR; 21	CHN; 16	FRA; DNQ	ITA; Ret	CAT; Ret																NC	0
2006	250cc	Honda									NED; 15	GBR; 12	GER; 15	CZE; Ret	MAL; 9	AUS; 15	JPN; Ret	POR; 13	VAL; 13						19th	20
2007	250cc	Aprilia	QAT; 11	SPA; Ret	TUR; 11	CHN; 11	FRA; 18	ITA; 12	CAT; 20	GBR; Ret	NED; 17	GER; 11	CZE; 13	RSM; 12	POR; 12	JPN; 17	AUS; 14	MAL; 10	VAL; 12						15th	47
2008	250cc	Aprilia	QAT; 9	SPA; 9	POR; 11	CHN; 9	FRA; 9	ITA; 9	CAT; Ret	GBR; 10	NED; 17	GER; 13	CZE; 10	RSM; Ret	INP; C	JPN; 7	AUS; 8	MAL; 5	VAL; 7						12th	92
2009	250cc	Aprilia	QAT	JPN	SPA	FRA	ITA	CAT	NED; 4	GER; 7	GBR	CZE													20th	22
2009	MotoGP	Ducati												INP; 13	RSM; 11	POR	AUS	MAL; 11	VAL; 13						18th	16
2010	MotoGP	Ducati	QAT; Ret	SPA; 15	FRA; 9	ITA; 8	GBR; 10	NED; 10	CAT; Ret	GER; Ret	USA; Ret	CZE; 12	INP; 9	RSM; 11	ARA; 10	JPN; 14	MAL; Ret	AUS; 8	POR; Ret	VAL; 11					14th	65
2011	Moto2	Pons Kalex	QAT; 11	SPA; 24	POR; Ret	FRA; 6	CAT; 3	GBR; 18	NED; 16	ITA; 9	GER; Ret	CZE; 6	INP; 10	RSM; Ret	ARA; 5	JPN; 31	AUS; 13	MAL; 8	VAL; 21						12th	76
2012	MotoGP	ART	QAT; 15	SPA; 12	POR; 12	FRA; 13	CAT; 13	GBR; 11	NED; Ret	GER; 13	ITA; 13	USA; 9	INP; 10	CZE; 10	RSM; Ret	ARA; 10	JPN; 12	MAL; 8	AUS; 10	VAL; 11					12th	74
2013	MotoGP	ART	QAT; 11	AME; 11	SPA; 9	FRA; 13	ITA; 8	CAT; 8	NED; 8	GER; 8	USA; Ret	INP; 12	CZE; 10	GBR; 10	RSM; 13	ARA; 11	MAL; 9	AUS; 11	JPN; Ret	VAL; 11					11th	93
2014	MotoGP	Forward Yamaha	QAT; 4	AME; 9	ARG; 15	SPA; 7	FRA; 9	ITA; 9	CAT; 6	**NED**; 4	GER; 6	INP; Ret	CZE; 8	GBR; 9	RSM; Ret	ARA; 2	JPN; 11	AUS; Ret	MAL; Ret	VAL; 7					7th	126
2015	MotoGP	Suzuki	QAT; 11	AME; 8	ARG; 7	SPA; 7	FRA; Ret	ITA; Ret	**CAT**; Ret	NED; 9	GER; 10	INP; 14	CZE; 9	GBR; 9	RSM; 10	ARA; 6	JPN; 11	AUS; 9	MAL; 7	VAL; 8					11th	105
2016	MotoGP	Suzuki	QAT; 11	ARG; 11	AME; 5	SPA; 5	FRA; 6	ITA; 9	CAT; Ret	NED; Ret	GER; 14	AUT; Ret	CZE; Ret	GBR; 7	RSM; Ret	ARA; 7	JPN; 4	AUS; Ret	MAL; 13	VAL; 8					11th	93
2017	MotoGP	Aprilia	QAT; 6	ARG; Ret	AME; 17	SPA; 9	FRA; Ret	ITA; Ret	CAT; Ret	NED; 10	GER; 7	CZE; 8	AUT; 13	GBR; Ret	RSM; Ret	ARA; 6	JPN; 7	AUS; Ret	MAL	VAL; Ret					15th	62
2018	MotoGP	Aprilia	QAT; 19	ARG; Ret	AME; 10	SPA; Ret	FRA; 9	ITA; Ret	CAT; Ret	NED; 13	GER; DNS	CZE; 15	AUT; 17	GBR; C	RSM; 14	ARA; 6	THA; 13	JPN; Ret	AUS; 9	MAL; 11	VAL; Ret				17th	44
2019	MotoGP	Aprilia	QAT; 10	ARG; 9	AME; Ret	SPA; 11	FRA; 12	ITA; 11	CAT; Ret	NED; 12	GER; Ret	CZE; 18	AUT; 14	GBR; Ret	RSM; 12	ARA; 7	THA; Ret	JPN; 15	AUS; 10	MAL; 13	VAL; 9				14th	63
2020	MotoGP	Aprilia	SPA; Ret	ANC; Ret	CZE; 10	AUT; 11	STY; 12	RSM; 13	EMI; Ret	CAT; 12	FRA; 14	ARA; 13	TER; Ret	EUR; Ret	VAL; 9	POR; 8									17th	42
2021	MotoGP	Aprilia	QAT; 7	DOH; 10	POR; 6	SPA; 6	FRA; Ret	ITA; 7	CAT; Ret	GER; 7	NED; 8	STY; Ret	AUT; 10	GBR; 3	ARA; 4	RSM; 8	AME; Ret	EMI; 7	ALR; Ret	VAL; 9					8th	120
2022	MotoGP	Aprilia	QAT; 4	INA; 9	**ARG**; 1	AME; 11	POR; 3	SPA; 3	FRA; 3	ITA; 3	**CAT**; 5	GER; 4	NED; 4	GBR; 9	AUT; 6	RSM; 6	ARA; 3	JPN; 16	THA; 11	AUS; 9	MAL; 10	VAL; Ret			4th	212
2023	MotoGP	Aprilia	POR; 9^{6}	ARG; 15	AME; Ret^{4}	**SPA**; 5	FRA; 5^{8}	ITA; 6^{8}	GER; 16^{9}	NED; 3^{4}	GBR; 1^{5}	AUT; 9^{7}	CAT; 1^{1}	RSM; 12^{8}	IND; Ret	JPN; 5	INA; 10	AUS; 8	THA; 8^{5}	MAL; Ret	QAT; Ret	VAL; 8			6th	206
2024	MotoGP	Aprilia	QAT; 8**^{3}**	POR; 8**^{8}**	AME; 7**^{5}**	SPA; Ret	FRA; 9**^{5}**	**CAT**; 4**^{1}**	ITA; 11**^{9}**	NED; DNS	GER; WD	**GBR**; 6**^{3}**	AUT; 9**^{3}**	ARA; 10	RSM; Ret	EMI; 8	INA; Ret	JPN; 9	AUS; 16**^{8}**	THA; 9	MAL; 13	SLD; 5^{4}			11th	163
2025	MotoGP	Honda	THA	ARG	AME	QAT	SPA; 17	FRA	GBR; Ret	ARA	ITA	NED; 16	GER	CZE	AUT	HUN	CAT; 17	RSM	JPN	INA	AUS	MAL	POR	VAL; Ret	28th	0
2026	MotoGP	Ducati	THA	BRA	USA	SPA	FRA	CAT	ITA	HUN	CZE	NED	GER	GBR	ARA	RSM	AUT	JPN	INA; DNS	AUS	MAL	QAT	POR	VAL	32th*	0*

Sporting positions
Preceded by Álvaro Bautista	Spanish 125cc Champion; 2004	Succeeded by Mateo Túnez
