= 2022 Trek–Segafredo (men's team) season =

Trek–Segafredo
- 2022 season
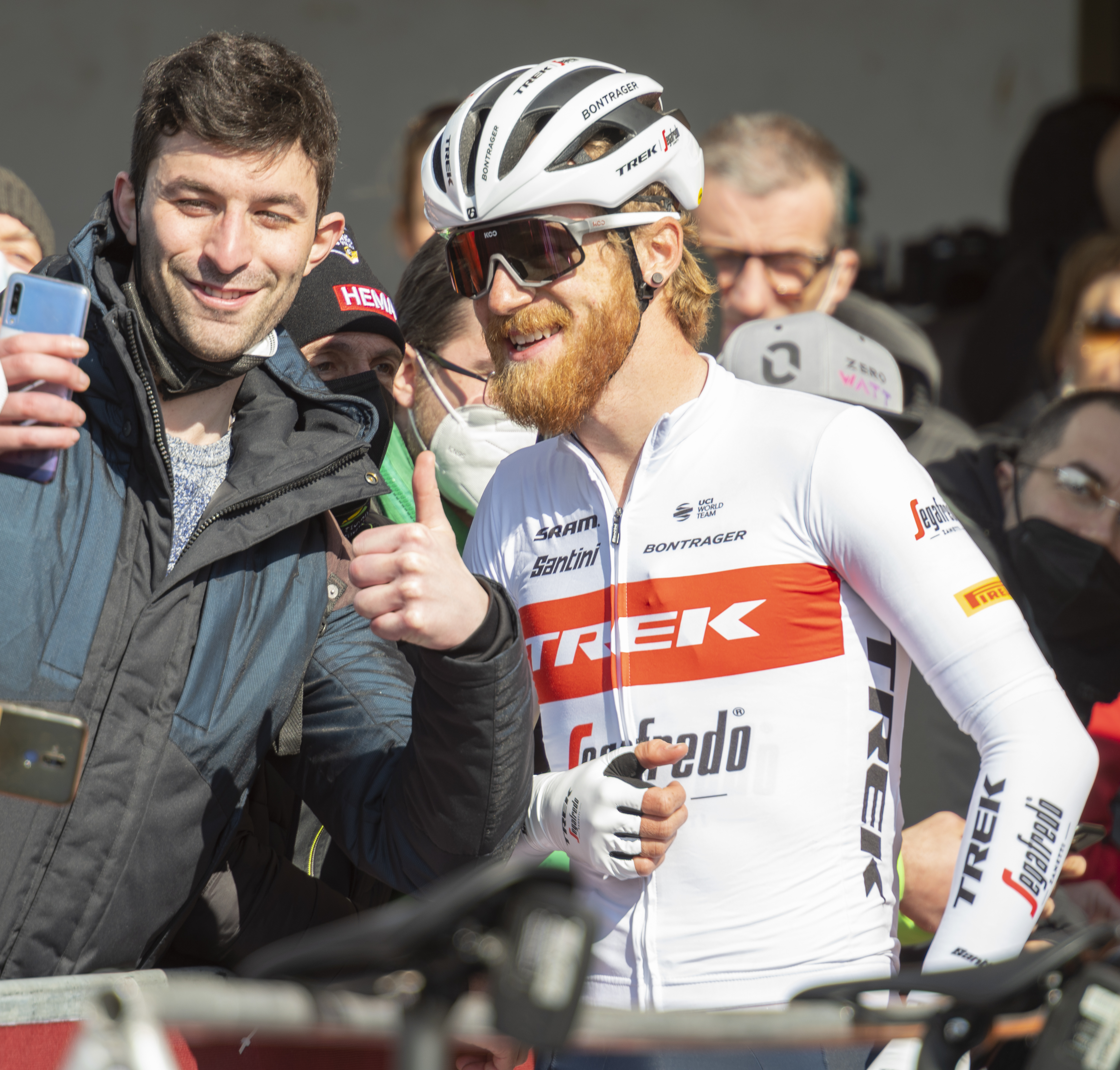
- Quinn Simmons at Strade Bianche
- UCI code: TFS
- Status: UCI WorldTeam
- Manager: Luca Guercilena (ITA)
- Main sponsor(s): Trek Bicycle Corporation; Massimo Zanetti Beverage Group
- Based: United States
- Bicycles: Trek
- Groupset: Sram

Season victories
- One-day races: 1
- Stage race stages: 9
- Jersey

The 2022 season for the Trek–Segafredo team is its 12th season overall, of which all of them have been at UCI WorldTeam level, and the seventh season under the current name. The team's title sponsors are Trek, an American bicycle manufacturer, and Segafredo, an Italian coffee brand. They also use SRAM drivetrain, Bontranger wheels and Santini clothing.

== Team roster ==
As of February 28, 2022.

Rider	Date of birth
Jon Aberasturi (ESP)	March 28, 1989 (aged 32)
Filippo Baroncini (ITA)	August 26, 2000 (aged 21)
Julien Bernard (FRA)	March 17, 1992 (aged 29)
Gianluca Brambilla (ITA)	August 22, 1987 (aged 34)
Marc Brustenga (ESP)	September 4, 1999 (aged 22)
Dario Cataldo (ITA)	March 17, 1985 (aged 36)
Giulio Ciccone (ITA)	December 20, 1994 (aged 27)
Jakob Egholm (DEN)	April 27, 1998 (aged 23)
Kenny Elissonde (FRA)	July 21, 1991 (aged 30)
Tony Gallopin (FRA)	May 24, 1988 (aged 33)
Amanuel Ghebreigzabhier (ERI)	August 17, 1994 (aged 27)
Asbjørn Hellemose (DEN)	January 15, 1999 (aged 22)
Markus Hoelgaard (NOR)	October 4, 1994 (aged 27)
Daan Hoole (NED)	February 22, 1999 (aged 22)
Alexander Kamp (DEN)	December 14, 1993 (aged 28)
Alex Kirsch (LUX)	June 12, 1992 (aged 29)

Rider	Date of birth
Emīls Liepiņš (LAT)	October 29, 1992 (aged 29)
Juan Pedro López (ESP)	July 31, 1997 (aged 24)
Bauke Mollema (NED)	November 26, 1986 (aged 35)
Jacopo Mosca (ITA)	August 29, 1993 (aged 28)
Matteo Moschetti (ITA)	August 14, 1996 (aged 25)
Mads Pedersen (DEN)	December 18, 1995 (aged 26)
Simon Pellaud (SUI)	November 6, 1992 (aged 29)
Quinn Simmons (USA)	May 8, 2001 (aged 20)
Mattias Skjelmose Jensen (DEN)	September 26, 2000 (aged 21)
Toms Skujiņš (LAT)	June 15, 1991 (aged 30)
Jasper Stuyven (BEL)	April 17, 1992 (aged 29)
Edward Theuns (BEL)	April 30, 1991 (aged 30)
Antonio Tiberi (ITA)	June 24, 2001 (aged 20)
Antwan Tolhoek (NED)	April 29, 1994 (aged 27)
Otto Vergaerde (BEL)	July 15, 1994 (aged 27)

Riders who joined the team for the 2022 season

Rider	2021 team
Jon Aberasturi	Caja Rural–Seguros RGA
Filippo Baroncini	neo-pro (Team Colpack–Ballan)
Marc Brustenga	neo-pro (Filial Caja Rural–Seguros RGA)
Dario Cataldo	Movistar Team
Tony Gallopin	AG2R Citroën Team
Asbjørn Hellemose	neo-pro (VC Mendrisio)
Markus Hoelgaard	Uno-X Pro Cycling Team
Daan Hoole	neo-pro (SEG Racing Academy)
Simon Pellaud	Androni Giocattoli–Sidermec
Antwan Tolhoek	Team Jumbo–Visma
Otto Vergaerde	Alpecin–Fenix

Riders who left the team during or after the 2021 season

Rider	2022 team
Nicola Conci	Gazprom–RusVelo
Koen de Kort	Retired
Niklas Eg	Uno-X Pro Cycling Team
Ryan Mullen	Bora–Hansgrohe
Antonio Nibali	Astana Qazaqstan Team
Vincenzo Nibali	Astana Qazaqstan Team
Charlie Quarterman	Philippe Wagner Cycling
Kiel Reijnen	Retired
Michel Ries	Arkéa–Samsic

== Season victories ==
Date	Race	Competition	Rider	Country	Location	Ref.
February 2	Étoile de Bessèges, Stage 1	UCI Europe Tour	Mads Pedersen (DEN)	France	Bellegarde	
February 5	Volta a la Comunitat Valenciana, Stage 4	UCI ProSeries	Matteo Moschetti (ITA)	Spain	Torrevieja	
February 6	Étoile de Bessèges, Points classification	UCI Europe Tour	Mads Pedersen (DEN)	France		
February 13	Tour de la Provence, Young rider classification	UCI ProSeries	Mattias Skjelmose Jensen (DEN)	France		
March 6	Paris–Nice, Stage 3	UCI World Tour	Mads Pedersen (DEN)	France	Dun-le-Palestel	
March 13	Tirreno–Adriatico, Mountains classification	UCI World Tour	Quinn Simmons (USA)	Italy		
April 5	Circuit de la Sarthe, Stage 1	UCI Europe Tour	Mads Pedersen (DEN)	France	Mamers	
April 7	Circuit de la Sarthe, Stage 3	UCI Europe Tour	Mads Pedersen (DEN)	France	Sablé-sur-Sarthe	
April 8	Circuit de la Sarthe, Points classification	UCI Europe Tour	Mads Pedersen (DEN)	France		
April 28	International Tour of Hellas, Stage 2	UCI Europe Tour	Matteo Moschetti (ITA)	Greece	Itea	
May 15	Tour de Hongrie, Stage 5	UCI Europe Tour	Antonio Tiberi (ITA)	Hungary	Gyöngyös (Kékestető)	
May 15	Tour de Hongrie, Team classification	UCI Europe Tour	(Note: The riders in the squad were Jon Aberasturi, Filippo Baroncini, Asbjørn Hellemose, Matteo Moschetti, Simon Pellaud, and Antonio Tiberi.)	Hungary		
May 22	Giro d'Italia, Stage 15	UCI World Tour	Giulio Ciccone (ITA)	Italy	Cogne	
May 29	Giro d'Italia, Young rider classification	UCI World Tour	Juan Pedro López (ESP)	Italy		
May 31	We Like Bike Criterium - San Daniele del Friuli	UCI Europe Tour	Giulio Ciccone (ITA)	Italy	San Daniele del Friuli	
15 July	Tour de France, Stage 13	UCI World Tour	Mads Pedersen (DEN)	France	Saint-Etienne	

== National, Continental, and World Champions ==
Date	Discipline	Jersey	Rider	Country	Location	Ref.
