= 2025 Tour of the Alps =

Cycling race

2025 UCI ProSeries

Race details
- Dates: 21–25 April 2025
- Stages: 5
- Distance: 746.9 km (464.1 mi)
- Winning time: 19h 48' 08"

Results
| Jersey awarded to the overall winner | Winner | Michael Storer (AUS) | (Tudor Pro Cycling Team) |
| | Second | Thymen Arensman (NED) | (INEOS Grenadiers) |
| | Third | Derek Gee (CAN) | (Israel–Premier Tech) |
| Jersey awarded to the points classification winner | Points | Paul Seixas (FRA) | (Decathlon–AG2R La Mondiale) |
| Jersey awarded to the mountains classification winner | Mountains | Finlay Pickering (GBR) | (Team Bahrain Victorious) |
| Jersey awarded to the young rider classification winner | Young rider | Max Poole (GBR) | (Team Picnic–PostNL) |
| | Team | Israel–Premier Tech | |

The 2025 Tour of the Alps is a road cycling stage race that takes place between 21 and 25 April 2025 in the Austrian state of Tyrol and in the Italian provinces of Trentino and South Tyrol, which all make up the Tyrol–South Tyrol–Trentino Euroregion. The race is rated as a category 2.Pro event on the 2025 UCI ProSeries calendar, and is the 48th edition of the Tour of the Alps.

== Teams ==
Eight UCI WorldTeams, five UCI ProTeams, two UCI Continental team and Austrian national team make up the sixteen teams that participate in the race.

UCI WorldTeams

- Decathlon–AG2R La Mondiale
- EF Education–EasyPost
- INEOS Grenadiers
- Lidl–Trek
- Red Bull–Bora–Hansgrohe
- Team Bahrain Victorious
- Team Jayco–AlUla
- Team Picnic–PostNL

UCI ProTeams

- Israel–Premier Tech
- Team Polti VisitMalta
- Team Solution Tech–Vini Fantini
- Tudor Pro Cycling Team
- VF Group–Bardiani–CSF–Faizanè

UCI Continental Teams

- Team UKYO
- Team Vorarlberg

National teams

- Austria

== Route ==
Stage characteristics and winners
| Stage | Date | Course | Distance | Type | Stage winner |
|---|---|---|---|---|---|
| 1 | 21 April | San Lorenzo Dorsino (Italy) to San Lorenzo Dorsino (Italy) | 148.5 km (92.3 mi) | Mountain stage | Giulio Ciccone (ITA) |
| 2 | 22 April | Mezzolombardo (Italy) to Sterzing (Italy) | 178 km (111 mi) | Mountain stage | Michael Storer (AUS) |
| 3 | 23 April | Sterzing (Italy) to Innichen (Italy) | 145.5 km (90.4 mi) | Intermediate stage | Marco Frigo (ITA) |
| 4 | 24 April | Sillian (Austria) to Obertilliach (Austria) | 162.7 km (101.1 mi) | Mountain stage | Thymen Arensman (NED) |
| 5 | 25 April | Lienz (Austria) to Lienz (Austria) | 112.2 km (69.7 mi) | Intermediate stage | Nicolas Prodhomme (FRA) |
| Total | | | 746.9 km (464.1 mi) | | |

== Stages ==
=== Stage 1 ===
21 April 2025 – San Lorenzo Dorsino (Italy) to San Lorenzo Dorsino (Italy), 148.5 km (92.3 mi)

Stage 1 Result
| Rank | Rider | Team | Time |
|---|---|---|---|
| 1 | Giulio Ciccone (ITA) | Lidl–Trek | 3h 42' 10" |
| 2 | Felix Gall (AUT) | Decathlon–AG2R La Mondiale | + 0" |
| 3 | Paul Seixas (FRA) | Decathlon–AG2R La Mondiale | + 0" |
| 4 | Romain Bardet (FRA) | Team Picnic–PostNL | + 0" |
| 5 | Florian Stork (GER) | Tudor Pro Cycling Team | + 0" |
| 6 | Jai Hindley (AUS) | Red Bull–Bora–Hansgrohe | + 0" |
| 7 | Michael Storer (AUS) | Tudor Pro Cycling Team | + 0" |
| 8 | Max Poole (GBR) | Team Picnic–PostNL | + 0" |
| 9 | Jefferson Alexander Cepeda (ECU) | EF Education–EasyPost | + 5" |
| 10 | Matthew Riccitello (USA) | Israel–Premier Tech | + 5" |

General classification after Stage 1
| Rank | Rider | Team | Time |
|---|---|---|---|
| 1 | Giulio Ciccone (ITA) | Lidl–Trek | 3h 42' 10" |
| 2 | Felix Gall (AUT) | Decathlon–AG2R La Mondiale | + 4" |
| 3 | Paul Seixas (FRA) | Decathlon–AG2R La Mondiale | + 6" |
| 4 | Romain Bardet (FRA) | Team Picnic–PostNL | + 10" |
| 5 | Florian Stork (GER) | Tudor Pro Cycling Team | + 10" |
| 6 | Jai Hindley (AUS) | Red Bull–Bora–Hansgrohe | + 10" |
| 7 | Michael Storer (AUS) | Tudor Pro Cycling Team | + 10" |
| 8 | Max Poole (GBR) | Team Picnic–PostNL | + 10" |
| 9 | Jefferson Alexander Cepeda (ECU) | EF Education–EasyPost | + 15" |
| 10 | Matthew Riccitello (USA) | Israel–Premier Tech | + 15" |

=== Stage 2 ===
22 April 2025 – Mezzolombardo (Italy) to Sterzing (Italy), 178 km (111 mi)

Stage 2 Result
| Rank | Rider | Team | Time |
|---|---|---|---|
| 1 | Michael Storer (AUS) | Tudor Pro Cycling Team | 5h 00' 02" |
| 2 | Paul Seixas (FRA) | Decathlon–AG2R La Mondiale | + 41" |
| 3 | Romain Bardet (FRA) | Team Picnic–PostNL | + 41" |
| 4 | Davide Piganzoli (ITA) | Team Polti VisitMalta | + 41" |
| 5 | Giulio Ciccone (ITA) | Lidl–Trek | + 41" |
| 6 | Jai Hindley (AUS) | Red Bull–Bora–Hansgrohe | + 41" |
| 7 | Felix Gall (AUT) | Decathlon–AG2R La Mondiale | + 41" |
| 8 | Damiano Caruso (ITA) | Team Bahrain Victorious | + 41" |
| 9 | Jefferson Alexander Cepeda (ECU) | EF Education–EasyPost | + 41" |
| 10 | Max Poole (GBR) | Team Picnic–PostNL | + 43" |

General classification after Stage 2
| Rank | Rider | Team | Time |
|---|---|---|---|
| 1 | Michael Storer (AUS) | Tudor Pro Cycling Team | 8h 42' 02" |
| 2 | Paul Seixas (FRA) | Decathlon–AG2R La Mondiale | + 41" |
| 3 | Giulio Ciccone (ITA) | Lidl–Trek | + 41" |
| 4 | Felix Gall (AUT) | Decathlon–AG2R La Mondiale | + 45" |
| 5 | Romain Bardet (FRA) | Team Picnic–PostNL | + 47" |
| 6 | Jai Hindley (AUS) | Red Bull–Bora–Hansgrohe | + 51" |
| 7 | Max Poole (GBR) | Team Picnic–PostNL | + 53" |
| 8 | Jefferson Alexander Cepeda (ECU) | EF Education–EasyPost | + 56" |
| 9 | Davide Piganzoli (ITA) | Team Polti VisitMalta | + 1' 00" |
| 10 | Damiano Caruso (ITA) | Team Bahrain Victorious | + 1' 05" |

=== Stage 3 ===
23 April 2025 – Sterzing (Italy) to Innichen (Italy), 145.5 km (90.4 mi)

Stage 3 Result
| Rank | Rider | Team | Time |
|---|---|---|---|
| 1 | Marco Frigo (ITA) | Israel–Premier Tech | 3h 47' 10" |
| 2 | Jai Hindley (AUS) | Red Bull–Bora–Hansgrohe | + 19" |
| 3 | Derek Gee (CAN) | Israel–Premier Tech | + 19" |
| 4 | Giulio Ciccone (ITA) | Lidl–Trek | + 19" |
| 5 | Max Poole (GBR) | Team Picnic–PostNL | + 19" |
| 6 | Paul Seixas (FRA) | Decathlon–AG2R La Mondiale | + 19" |
| 7 | Damiano Caruso (ITA) | Team Bahrain Victorious | + 19" |
| 8 | Michael Storer (AUS) | Tudor Pro Cycling Team | + 19" |
| 9 | Nicolas Prodhomme (FRA) | Decathlon–AG2R La Mondiale | + 19" |
| 10 | Romain Bardet (FRA) | Team Picnic–PostNL | + 19" |

General classification after Stage 3
| Rank | Rider | Team | Time |
|---|---|---|---|
| 1 | Michael Storer (AUS) | Tudor Pro Cycling Team | 12h 29' 31" |
| 2 | Giulio Ciccone (ITA) | Lidl–Trek | + 41" |
| 3 | Paul Seixas (FRA) | Decathlon–AG2R La Mondiale | + 41" |
| 4 | Jai Hindley (AUS) | Red Bull–Bora–Hansgrohe | + 45" |
| 5 | Felix Gall (AUT) | Decathlon–AG2R La Mondiale | + 45" |
| 6 | Romain Bardet (FRA) | Team Picnic–PostNL | + 47" |
| 7 | Max Poole (GBR) | Team Picnic–PostNL | + 53" |
| 8 | Jefferson Alexander Cepeda (ECU) | EF Education–EasyPost | + 56" |
| 9 | Davide Piganzoli (ITA) | Team Polti VisitMalta | + 1' 00" |
| 10 | Damiano Caruso (ITA) | Team Bahrain Victorious | + 1' 05" |

=== Stage 4 ===
24 April 2025 – Sillian (Austria) to Obertilliach (Austria), 162.7 km (101.1 mi)

Stage 4 Result
| Rank | Rider | Team | Time |
|---|---|---|---|
| 1 | Thymen Arensman (NED) | INEOS Grenadiers | 4h 17' 04" |
| 2 | Derek Gee (CAN) | Israel–Premier Tech | + 1' 18" |
| 3 | Michael Storer (AUS) | Tudor Pro Cycling Team | + 1' 23" |
| 4 | Felix Gall (AUT) | Decathlon–AG2R La Mondiale | + 3' 44" |
| 5 | Giulio Ciccone (ITA) | Lidl–Trek | + 3' 44" |
| 6 | Damiano Caruso (ITA) | Team Bahrain Victorious | + 3' 44" |
| 7 | Max Poole (GBR) | Team Picnic–PostNL | + 4' 29" |
| 8 | Davide Piganzoli (ITA) | Team Polti VisitMalta | + 4' 35" |
| 9 | Romain Bardet (FRA) | Team Picnic–PostNL | + 4' 35" |
| 10 | Jefferson Alexander Cepeda (ECU) | EF Education–EasyPost | + 4' 35" |

General classification after Stage 4
| Rank | Rider | Team | Time |
|---|---|---|---|
| 1 | Thymen Arensman (NED) | INEOS Grenadiers | 16h 47' 43" |
| 2 | Michael Storer (AUS) | Tudor Pro Cycling Team | + 11" |
| 3 | Derek Gee (CAN) | Israel–Premier Tech | + 2' 15" |
| 4 | Giulio Ciccone (ITA) | Lidl–Trek | + 3' 17" |
| 5 | Felix Gall (AUT) | Decathlon–AG2R La Mondiale | + 3' 21" |
| 6 | Damiano Caruso (ITA) | Team Bahrain Victorious | + 3' 41" |
| 7 | Romain Bardet (FRA) | Team Picnic–PostNL | + 4' 14" |
| 8 | Max Poole (GBR) | Team Picnic–PostNL | + 4' 14" |
| 9 | Jai Hindley (AUS) | Red Bull–Bora–Hansgrohe | + 4' 17" |
| 10 | Jefferson Alexander Cepeda (ECU) | EF Education–EasyPost | + 4' 23" |

=== Stage 5 ===
25 April 2025 – Lienz (Austria) to Lienz (Austria), 112.2 km (69.7 mi)

Stage 5 Result
| Rank | Rider | Team | Time |
|---|---|---|---|
| 1 | Nicolas Prodhomme (FRA) | Decathlon–AG2R La Mondiale | 2h 58' 54" |
| 2 | Paul Seixas (FRA) | Decathlon–AG2R La Mondiale | + 0" |
| 3 | Emil Herzog (GER) | Red Bull–Bora–Hansgrohe | + 29" |
| 4 | Koen Bouwman (NED) | Team Jayco–AlUla | + 1' 08" |
| 5 | Mattia Bais (ITA) | Team Polti VisitMalta | + 1' 08" |
| 6 | Jakob Fuglsang (DEN) | Israel–Premier Tech | + 1' 08" |
| 7 | Manuele Tarozzi (ITA) | VF Group–Bardiani–CSF–Faizanè | + 1' 08" |
| 8 | Michael Storer (AUS) | Tudor Pro Cycling Team | + 1' 20" |
| 9 | Thymen Arensman (NED) | INEOS Grenadiers | + 3' 04" |
| 10 | Max Poole (GBR) | Team Picnic–PostNL | + 3' 23" |

General classification after Stage 5
| Rank | Rider | Team | Time |
|---|---|---|---|
| 1 | Michael Storer (AUS) | Tudor Pro Cycling Team | 19h 48' 08" |
| 2 | Thymen Arensman (NED) | INEOS Grenadiers | + 1' 33" |
| 3 | Derek Gee (CAN) | Israel–Premier Tech | + 4' 07" |
| 4 | Giulio Ciccone (ITA) | Lidl–Trek | + 5' 09" |
| 5 | Felix Gall (AUT) | Decathlon–AG2R La Mondiale | + 5' 13" |
| 6 | Damiano Caruso (ITA) | Team Bahrain Victorious | + 5' 33" |
| 7 | Max Poole (GBR) | Team Picnic–PostNL | + 6' 06" |
| 8 | Jai Hindley (AUS) | Red Bull–Bora–Hansgrohe | + 6' 09" |
| 9 | Matthew Riccitello (USA) | Israel–Premier Tech | + 6' 33" |
| 10 | Romain Bardet (FRA) | Team Picnic–PostNL | + 6' 46" |

== Classification leadership table ==
Classification leadership by stage
| Stage | Winner | General classification | Points classification | Mountains classification | Young rider classification | Team classification |
|---|---|---|---|---|---|---|
| 1 | Giulio Ciccone | Giulio Ciccone | Giulio Ciccone | Finlay Pickering | Paul Seixas | VF Group–Bardiani–CSF–Faizanè |
| 2 | Michael Storer | Michael Storer | Giulio Ciccone | Finlay Pickering | Paul Seixas | VF Group–Bardiani–CSF–Faizanè |
| 3 | Marco Frigo | Michael Storer | Giulio Ciccone | Finlay Pickering | Paul Seixas | Decathlon–AG2R La Mondiale |
| 4 | Thymen Arensman | Thymen Arensman | Giulio Ciccone | Finlay Pickering | Max Poole | Israel–Premier Tech |
| 5 | Nicolas Prodhomme | Michael Storer | Paul Seixas | Finlay Pickering | Max Poole | Israel–Premier Tech |
| Final | | Michael Storer | Paul Seixas | Finlay Pickering | Max Poole | Israel–Premier Tech |

== Classification standings ==
Legend
| Denotes the winner of the general classification | Denotes the winner of the mountains classification |
| Denotes the winner of the points classification | Denotes the winner of the young rider classification |

=== General classification ===
Final general classification (1–10)
| Rank | Rider | Team | Time |
|---|---|---|---|
| 1 | Michael Storer (AUS) | Tudor Pro Cycling Team | 19h 48' 08" |
| 2 | Thymen Arensman (NED) | INEOS Grenadiers | + 1' 33" |
| 3 | Derek Gee (CAN) | Israel–Premier Tech | + 4' 07" |
| 4 | Giulio Ciccone (ITA) | Lidl–Trek | + 5' 09" |
| 5 | Felix Gall (AUT) | Decathlon–AG2R La Mondiale | + 5' 13" |
| 6 | Damiano Caruso (ITA) | Team Bahrain Victorious | + 5' 33" |
| 7 | Max Poole (GBR) | Team Picnic–PostNL | + 6' 06" |
| 8 | Jai Hindley (AUS) | Red Bull–Bora–Hansgrohe | + 6' 09" |
| 9 | Matthew Riccitello (USA) | Israel–Premier Tech | + 6' 33" |
| 10 | Romain Bardet (FRA) | Team Picnic–PostNL | + 6' 46" |

=== Points classification ===
Final points classification (1–10)
| Rank | Rider | Team | Points |
|---|---|---|---|
| 1 | Paul Seixas (FRA) | Decathlon–AG2R La Mondiale | 63 |
| 2 | Michael Storer (AUS) | Tudor Pro Cycling Team | 47 |
| 3 | Giulio Ciccone (ITA) | Lidl–Trek | 45 |
| 4 | Thymen Arensman (NED) | INEOS Grenadiers | 37 |
| 5 | Derek Gee (CAN) | Israel–Premier Tech | 36 |
| 6 | Marco Frigo (ITA) | Israel–Premier Tech | 35 |
| 7 | Felix Gall (AUT) | Decathlon–AG2R La Mondiale | 30 |
| 8 | Jai Hindley (AUS) | Red Bull–Bora–Hansgrohe | 28 |
| 9 | Nicolas Prodhomme (FRA) | Decathlon–AG2R La Mondiale | 27 |
| 10 | Koen Bouwman (NED) | Team Jayco–AlUla | 24 |

=== Mountains classification ===
Final mountains classification (1–10)
| Rank | Rider | Team | Points |
|---|---|---|---|
| 1 | Finlay Pickering (GBR) | Team Bahrain Victorious | 34 |
| 2 | Koen Bouwman (NED) | Team Jayco–AlUla | 22 |
| 3 | Marco Frigo (ITA) | Israel–Premier Tech | 16 |
| 4 | Paul Seixas (FRA) | Decathlon–AG2R La Mondiale | 16 |
| 5 | Fran Miholjević (CRO) | Team Bahrain Victorious | 14 |
| 6 | Andrew August (USA) | INEOS Grenadiers | 10 |
| 7 | Thymen Arensman (NED) | INEOS Grenadiers | 9 |
| 8 | Nicolas Prodhomme (FRA) | Decathlon–AG2R La Mondiale | 8 |
| 9 | Davide Bais (ITA) | Team Polti VisitMalta | 8 |
| 10 | Jefferson Alexander Cepeda (ECU) | EF Education–EasyPost | 6 |

=== Young rider classification ===
Final young rider classification (1–10)
| Rank | Rider | Team | Time |
|---|---|---|---|
| 1 | Max Poole (GBR) | Team Picnic–PostNL | 19h 54' 14" |
| 2 | Matthew Riccitello (USA) | Israel–Premier Tech | + 27" |
| 3 | Davide Piganzoli (ITA) | Team Polti VisitMalta | + 53" |
| 4 | Paul Seixas (FRA) | Decathlon–AG2R La Mondiale | + 2' 06" |
| 5 | Emil Herzog (GER) | Red Bull–Bora–Hansgrohe | + 30' 33" |
| 6 | Philipp Hofbauer (AUT) | Austria | + 36' 59" |
| 7 | Vicente Rojas (CHI) | VF Group–Bardiani–CSF–Faizanè | + 37' 51" |
| 8 | Robin Donzé (SUI) | Tudor Pro Cycling Team | + 38' 05" |
| 9 | Matteo Vanhuffel (BEL) | Team Picnic–PostNL | + 40' 01" |
| 10 | Andrew August (USA) | INEOS Grenadiers | + 42' 18" |

=== Team classification ===
Final team classification (1–10)
| Rank | Team | Time |
|---|---|---|
| 1 | Israel–Premier Tech | 59h 55' 45" |
| 2 | (Australia) Team Jayco–AlUla | + 2' 42" |
| 3 | (France) Decathlon–AG2R La Mondiale | + 4' 01" |
| 4 | (United States) Lidl–Trek | + 18' 58" |
| 5 | (Netherlands) Team Picnic–PostNL | + 21' 40" |
| 6 | (Germany) Red Bull–Bora–Hansgrohe | + 25' 30" |
| 7 | (Italy) VF Group–Bardiani–CSF–Faizanè | + 37' 59" |
| 8 | (United Kingdom) INEOS Grenadiers | + 38' 28" |
| 9 | (Switzerland) Tudor Pro Cycling Team | + 40' 19" |
| 10 | (Italy) Team Polti VisitMalta | + 41' 44" |
