= 2025 Tour of Austria =

Austrian cycling race

2025 UCI Europe Tour

Race details
- Dates: 9-13 July 2025
- Stages: 5
- Distance: 717.6 km (445.9 mi)
- Winning time: 17h 51' 18"

Results
Jersey awarded to the overall winner	Winner	Isaac del Toro (MEX)	(UAE Team Emirates XRG)
	Second	Archie Ryan (IRL)	(EF Education–EasyPost)
	Third	Rafal Majka (POL)	(UAE Team Emirates XRG)
Jersey awarded to the points classification winner	Points	Isaac del Toro (MEX)	(UAE Team Emirates XRG)
Jersey awarded to the mountains classification winner	Mountains	Nicolya Vinokurov (KAZ)	(XDS Astana Team)
Jersey awarded to the young rider classification winner	Young rider	Isaac del Toro (MEX)	(UAE Team Emirates XRG)
	Team	UAE Team Emirates XRG	

The 2025 Tour of Austria was a road cycling stage race that took place between 9 and 13 July 2025 in Austria. The race was rated as a category 2.1 event on the 2025 UCI Europe Tour calendar, and was the 74th edition of the Tour of Austria.

== Teams ==
Seven of the 18 UCI WorldTeams, one UCI ProTeam, and twelve UCI Continental teams, made up the 20 teams that participated in the race.

UCI WorldTeams

- Alpecin–Deceuninck
- EF Education–EasyPost
- INEOS Grenadiers
- Lidl–Trek
- Team Jayco–AlUla
- UAE Team Emirates XRG
- XDS Astana Team

UCI ProTeams

- Unibet Tietema Rockets

UCI Continental Teams

- ARBÖ Kärnten Sport Feld am See
- Hrinkow Advarics
- Team Vorarlberg
- Tirol KTM Cycling Team
- WSA KTM Graz
- ATT Investments
- Benotti Berthold
- Run & Race–Wibatech
- S.C. Padovani Polo Cherry Bank
- Team Coop–Repsol
- Team United Shipping
- Voster ATS Team

== Route ==
Stage characteristics and winners
Stage	Date	Course	Distance	Type	Stage winner
1	9 July	Steyr to Steyr	167.8 km (104.3 mi)	Hilly stage	Felix Grossschartner (AUT)
2	10 July	Bischofshofen to St. Johann, Alpendorf	142.1 km (88.3 mi)	Hilly stage	Isaac del Toro (MEX)
3	11 July	Salzburg, Schloss Hellbrunn to Salzburg, Gaisberg	142.9 km (88.8 mi)	Mountain stage	Isaac del Toro (MEX)
4	12 July	Innsbruck to Kühtai	117.3 km (72.9 mi)	Mountain stage	Isaac del Toro (MEX)
5	13 July	Feldkirch to Feldkirch	144.1 km (89.5 mi)	Mountain stage	Bob Jungels (LUX)
Total			717.6 km (445.9 mi)		
