= Nicolas Prodhomme =

French bicycle racer

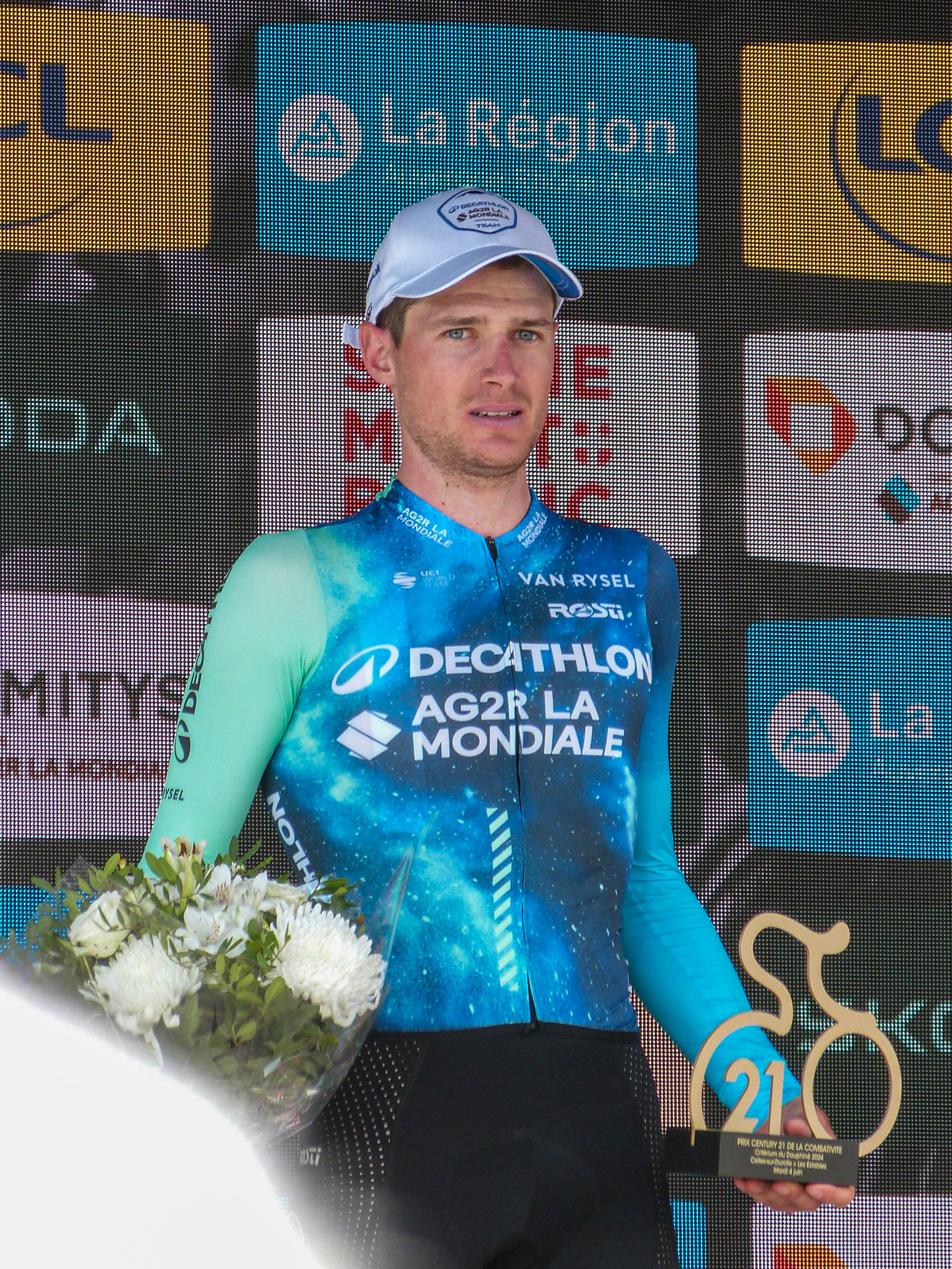
- Prodhomme at the 2024 Critérium du Dauphiné

Personal information
- Born: 1 February 1997 (age 29) L'Aigle, France
- Height: 1.74 m (5 ft 9 in)
- Weight: 63 kg (139 lb)

Cycling career
- Sport: Cycling
- Current team: Decathlon CMA CGM Team
- Discipline: Road
- Role: Rider
- Rider type: Climber; Puncheur

Amateur teams
- 2008–2015: Souvenir Daniel-Laborne
- 2016: Sud Gironde Cyclisme
- 2017: CM Aubervilliers 93
- 2017: HP BTP–Auber93 (stagiaire)
- 2018–2019: Chambéry CF

Professional teams
- 2018: AG2R La Mondiale (stagiaire)
- 2020: Cofidis (stagiaire)
- 2021–: AG2R Citroën Team

Major wins
- Grand Tours Giro d'Italia 1 individual stage (2025)

Nicolas Prodhomme (born 1 February 1997) is a French cyclist, who currently rides for UCI WorldTeam Decathlon CMA CGM.

== Major results ==
2018
4th Road race, National Under-23 Road Championships
4th Overall Kreiz Breizh Elites
4th Il Piccolo Lombardia
7th Chrono des Nations U23
8th Paris–Roubaix Espoirs
2019
1st Overall Orlen Nations Grand Prix
4th Giro del Belvedere
6th Overall Le Tour de Savoie Mont Blanc
7th G.P. Palio del Recioto
9th Overall Giro della Regione Friuli Venezia Giulia

1st Stage 1 (TTT)

9th Overall Grand Prix Priessnitz spa
10th Overall Circuit des Ardennes
2023
3rd Overall Tour de l'Ain
8th Paris–Camembert
2024
5th Clásica Jaén Paraíso Interior
6th Tour du Doubs
2025 (6 pro wins)
1st Overall Route d'Occitanie

1st Stage 3

1st Polynormande
1st Stage 19 Giro d'Italia
1st Stage 5 Tour of the Alps
2nd Overall Tour de l'Ain

1st Points classification
1st Stage 2

5th Overall Tour du Limousin
7th Grand Prix La Marseillaise
10th Overall Vuelta a Andalucía

=== Grand Tour general classification results timeline ===
Grand Tour	2021	2022	2023	2024	2025	2026
Giro d'Italia	—	65	23	—	15	—
Tour de France	—	—	—	48	—	16
Vuelta a España	52	73	27	—	—	

Legend
—	Did not compete
DNF	Did not finish
IP	Race in Progress
