= Asbjørn Hellemose =

Danish cyclist, born 1999

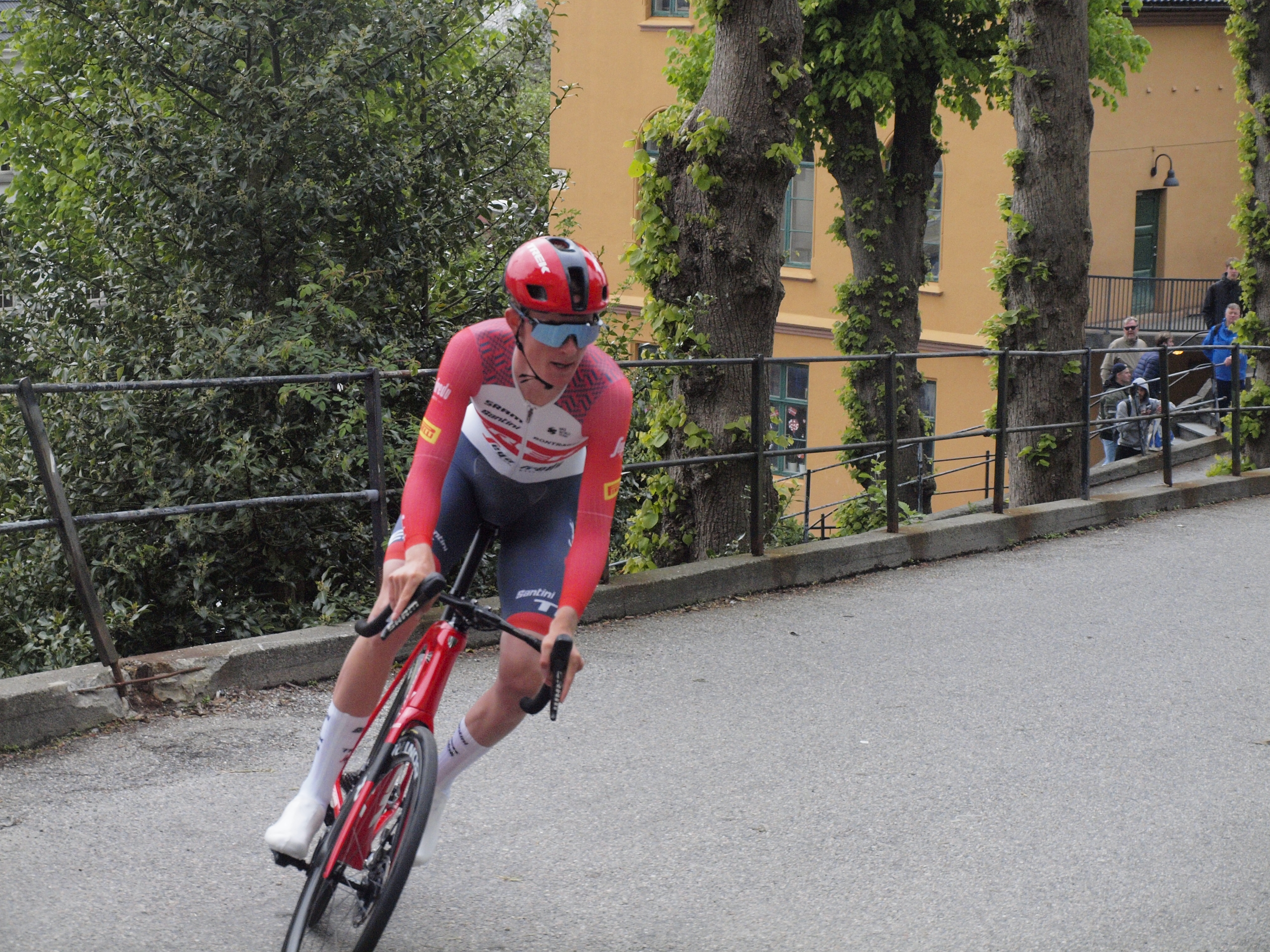
- Hellemose in 2023

Personal information
- Born: 4 September 1999 (age 27) Galten, Denmark
- Height: 1.92 m (6 ft 4 in)
- Weight: 65 kg (143 lb)

Cycling career
- Sport: Cycling
- Current team: Team Jayco–AlUla
- Disciplines: Road; Gravel
- Role: Rider

Amateur teams
- 2018: Hammel CK
- 2019: Team OK Kvickly Odder
- 2020–2021: VC Mendrisio
- 2024: Swatt Club

Professional teams
- 2021: Trek–Segafredo (stagiaire)
- 2022–2023: Trek–Segafredo
- 2025–: Team Jayco–AlUla

Asbjørn Hellemose (born 15 January 1999) is a Danish cyclist, who currently rides for UCI WorldTeam Team Jayco–AlUla.

== Major results ==
2017
4th Grand Prix Bati-Metallo
2020
5th Il Piccolo Lombardia
9th Overall Giro Ciclistico d'Italia
2021
5th Overall Giro Ciclistico d'Italia
6th Giro del Belvedere
10th Overall Giro della Valle d'Aosta
2024
1st Stage 2 Santa Vall
4th The Traka 200
2025
7th Overall Tour of Austria
2026
10th Overall Tour of Austria
