= Rudolf Mitteregger =

Austrian cyclist (1944–2024)

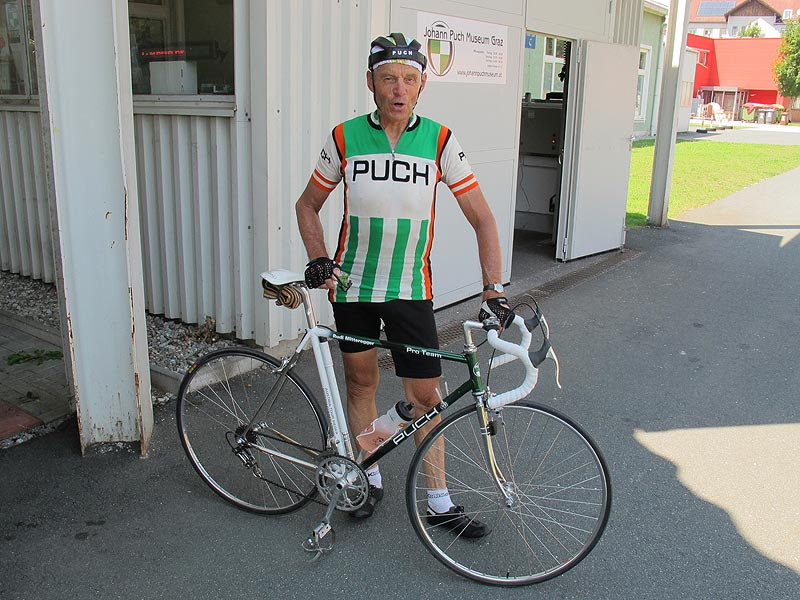
- Mitteregger in 2014

Personal information
- Born: 27 November 1944 Gaal, Styria, Nazi Germany
- Died: 24 April 2024 (aged 79) Knittelfeld, Styria, Austria

Cycling career
- Sport: Cycling

Rudolf Mitteregger (27 November 1944 – 24 April 2024) was an Austrian cyclist. He competed at the 1972 Summer Olympics and the 1976 Summer Olympics. He also won the Tour of Austria in 1970, 1974 and 1977.

Mitteregger died on 24 April 2024, at the age of 79.
