= Tour of Austria =

Stage cycling race held in Austria

Race details
- Date: Early July
- Region: Austria
- Local name: Internationale Österreich Rundfahrt (in German)
- Discipline: Road
- Competition: UCI Europe Tour
- Type: Stage race
- Web site: tourofaustria.com

History
- First edition: 1949
- Editions: 75 (as of 2026)
- First winner: Richard Menapace (AUT)
- Most wins: Wolfgang Steinmayr (AUT) (4 wins)
- Most recent: Gregor Mühlberger (AUT)

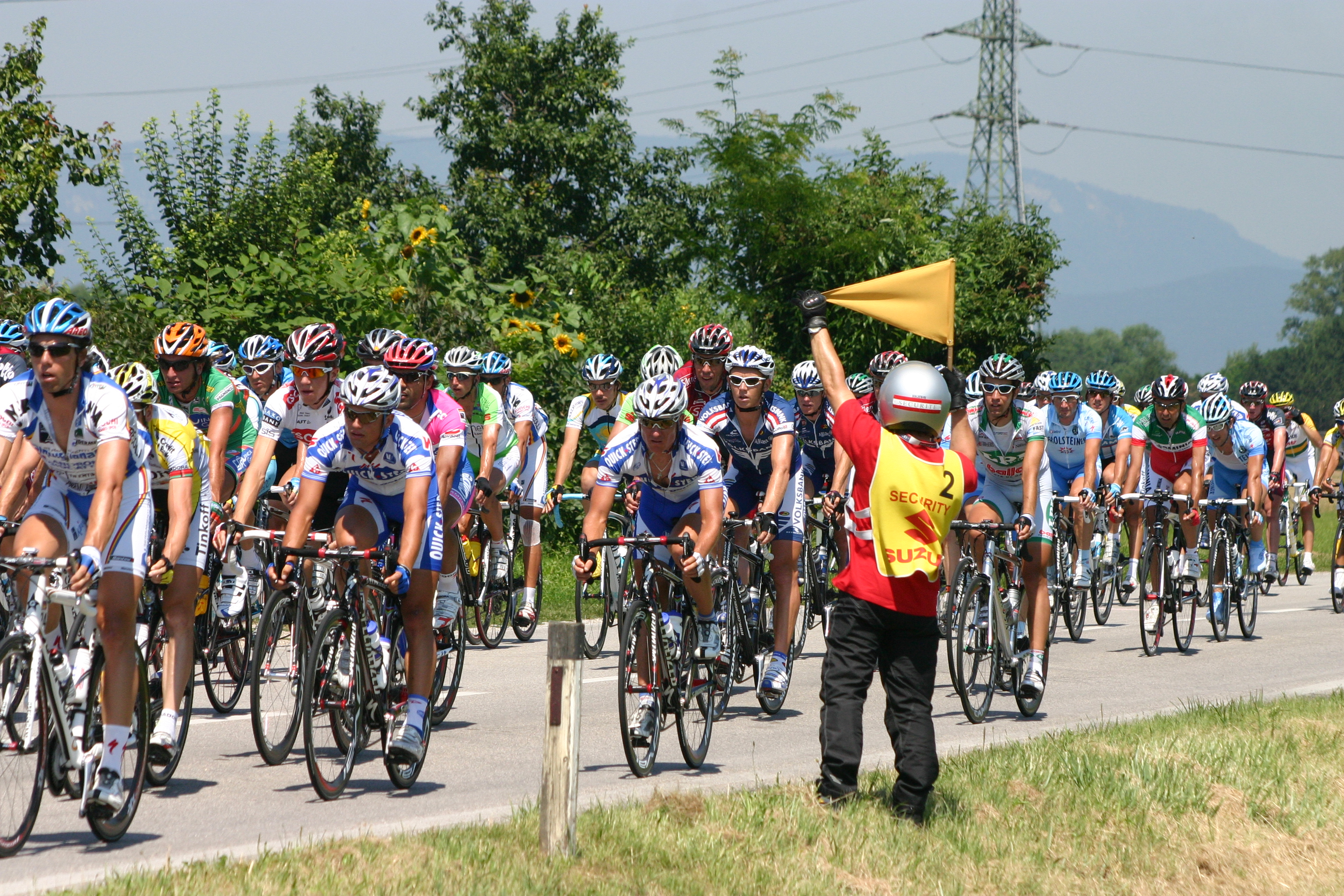
The 60th Tour of Austria in 2008

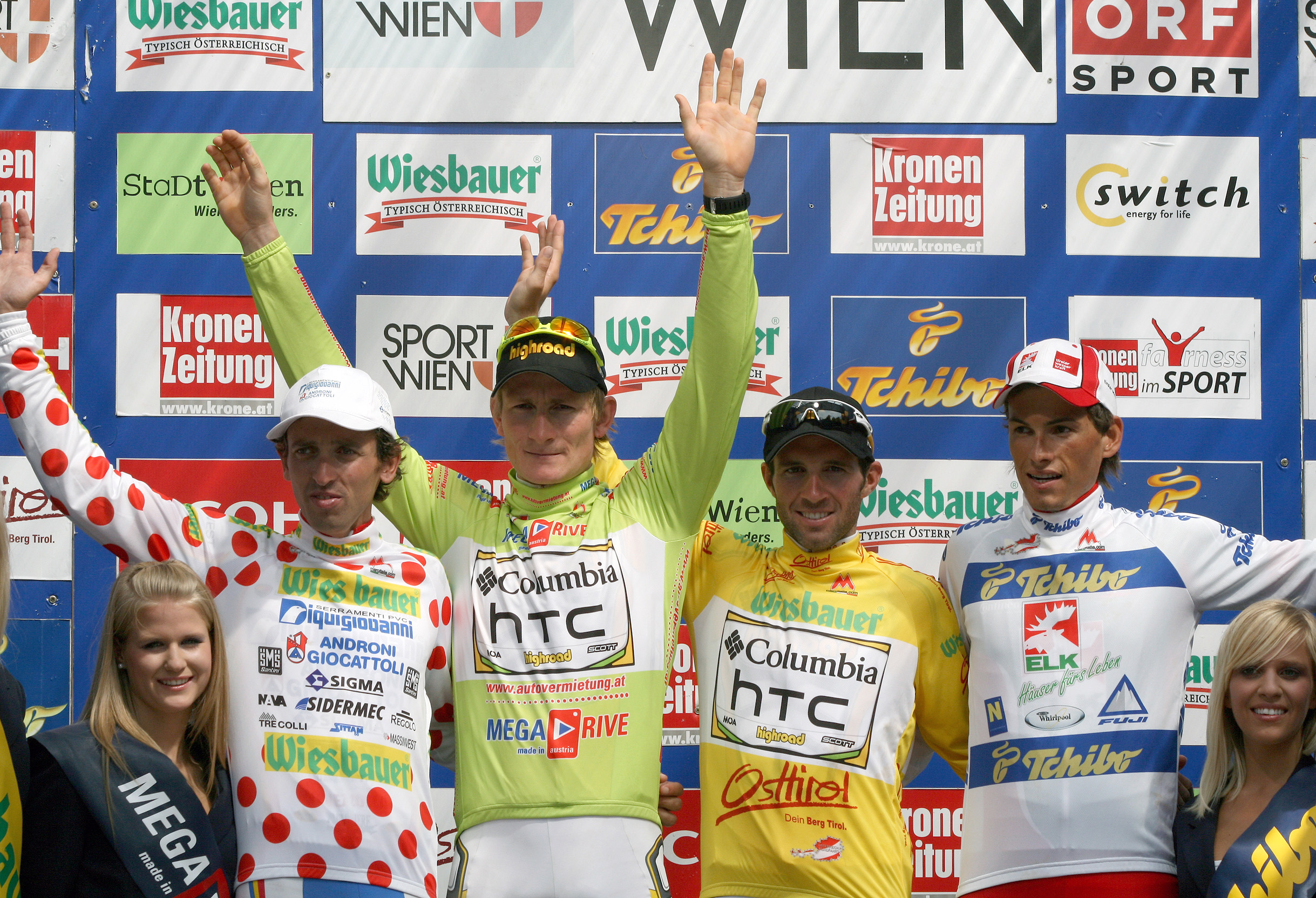
Victory podium at the 2009 Tour of Austria

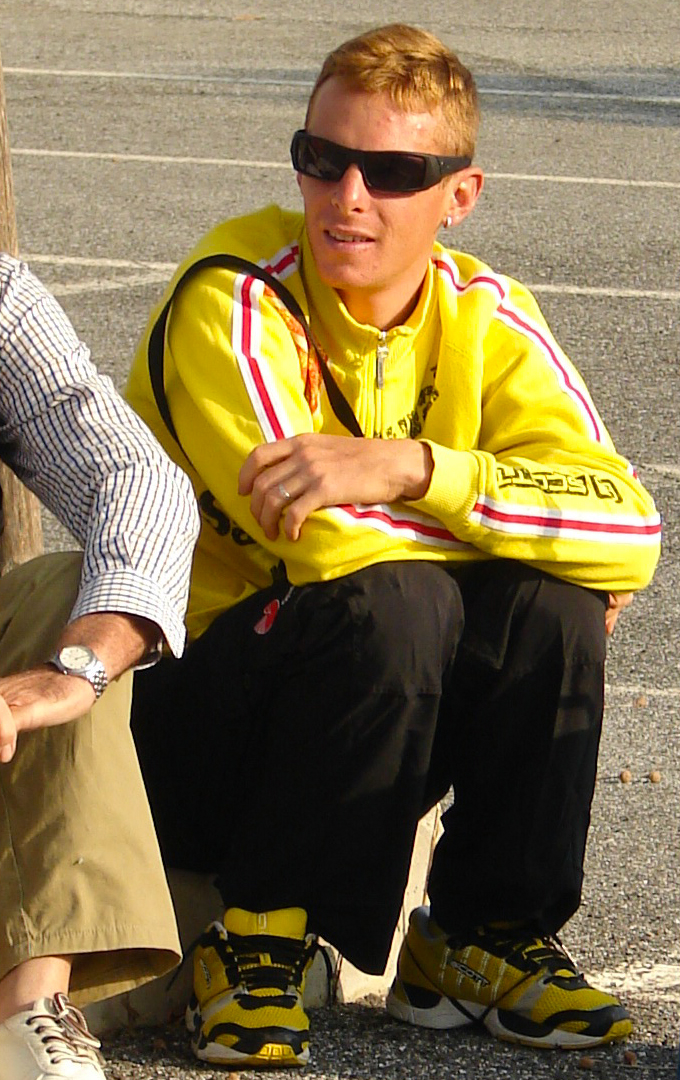
Riccardo Riccò, winner at the 2010 Tour of Austria

The Tour of Austria (German: Internationale Österreich Rundfahrt) is a stage cycling race held in Austria. From 1949 to 1995 it was a race for amateur cyclists and became a professional event in 1996. In 2005 and 2006 it was organised as a 2.1 event on the UCI Europe Tour, becoming a 2.HC event in 2007. and then a UCI ProSeries race in 2020. Since 2005 it has usually been held in July. Before that, it was seen as an ideal preparation race for the Tour de France.

== Winners ==
Year	Country	Rider	Team
1949	Austria	Richard Menapace	
1950	Austria	Richard Menapace	
1951	Austria	Franz Deutsch	
1952	Austria	Franz Deutsch	
1953	Luxembourg	Francis Gelhausen	
1954	Austria	Adolf Christian	
1955	Sweden	Lasse Nordvall	
1956	Sweden	Roland Ströhm	
1957	Sweden	Gunnar Göransson	
1958	Austria	Richard Durlacher	
1959	Austria	Stefan Mascha	
1960	Netherlands	René Lotz	
1961	Austria	Stefan Mascha	
1962	Austria	Walter Müller	
1963	Netherlands	Jan Pieterse	
1964	Luxembourg	Edy Schütz	
1965	Austria	Hans Furian	
1966	Austria	Hans Furian	
1967	Netherlands	Rini Wagtmans	
1968	Netherlands	Jan Krekels	
1969	Netherlands	Matthijs de Koning	
1970	Austria	Rudolf Mitteregger	
1971	Austria	Roman Humenberger	
1972	Austria	Wolfgang Steinmayr	
1973	Austria	Wolfgang Steinmayr	
1974	Austria	Rudolf Mitteregger	
1975	Austria	Wolfgang Steinmayr	
1976	Austria	Wolfgang Steinmayr	
1977	Austria	Rudolf Mitteregger	
1978	Norway	Jostein Wilmann	
1979	Austria	Herbert Spindler	
1980	Norway	Geir Digerud	
1981	Austria	Gerhard Zadrobilek	
1982	Austria	Helmut Wechselberger	
1983	Austria	Kurt Zellhofer	
1984	Switzerland	Stefan Maurer	
1985	East Germany	Olaf Jentzsch	
1986	Austria	Helmut Wechselberger	
1987	Soviet Union	Dimitri Konychev	
1988	Austria	Dietmar Hauer	
1989	Yugoslavia	Valter Bonča	
1990	Austria	Dietmar Hauer	
1991	Czechoslovakia	Roman Kreuziger	
1992	Slovenia	Valter Bonča	
1993	Austria	Georg Totschnig	
1994	Austria	Harald Morscher	
1995	Norway	Steffen Kjærgaard	
1996	Belgium	Frank Vandenbroucke	Mapei–GB
1997	Italy	Daniele Nardello	Mapei–GB
1998	Switzerland	Beat Zberg	Rabobank
1999	Italy	Maurizio Vandelli	Stabil Graz
2000	Austria	Georg Totschnig	Team Telekom
2001	Australia	Cadel Evans	Saeco
2002	Austria	Gerrit Glomser	Saeco–Longoni Sport
2003	Austria	Gerrit Glomser	Saeco
2004	Australia	Cadel Evans	T-Mobile Team
2005	Spain	Juan Miguel Mercado	Quick-Step–Innergetic
2006	United States	Tom Danielson	Discovery Channel
2007	Belgium	Stijn Devolder	Discovery Channel
2008	Austria	Thomas Rohregger	Elk Haus-Simplon
2009	Switzerland	Michael Albasini	Team Columbia–HTC
2010	Italy	Riccardo Riccò	Ceramica Flaminia
2011	Sweden	Fredrik Kessiakoff	Astana
2012	Denmark	Jakob Fuglsang	RadioShack–Nissan
2013	Austria	Riccardo Zoidl	Gourmetfein–Simplon
2014	Great Britain	Peter Kennaugh	Team Sky
2015	Spain	Victor de la Parte	Team Vorarlberg
2016	Czech Republic	Jan Hirt	CCC–Sprandi–Polkowice
2017	Austria	Stefan Denifl	Aqua Blue Sport
2018	Belgium	Ben Hermans	Israel Cycling Academy
2019	Belgium	Ben Hermans	Israel Cycling Academy
2020	No race due to the COVID-19 pandemic		
2021	No race due to the COVID-19 pandemic		
2022	No race due to financial problems		
2023	Ecuador	Jhonatan Narváez	INEOS Grenadiers
2024	Italy	Diego Ulissi	UAE Team Emirates
2025	Mexico	Isaac del Toro	UAE Team Emirates XRG
2026	Austria	Gregor Mühlberger	Austria (national team)
