= Finlay Pickering =

British cyclist

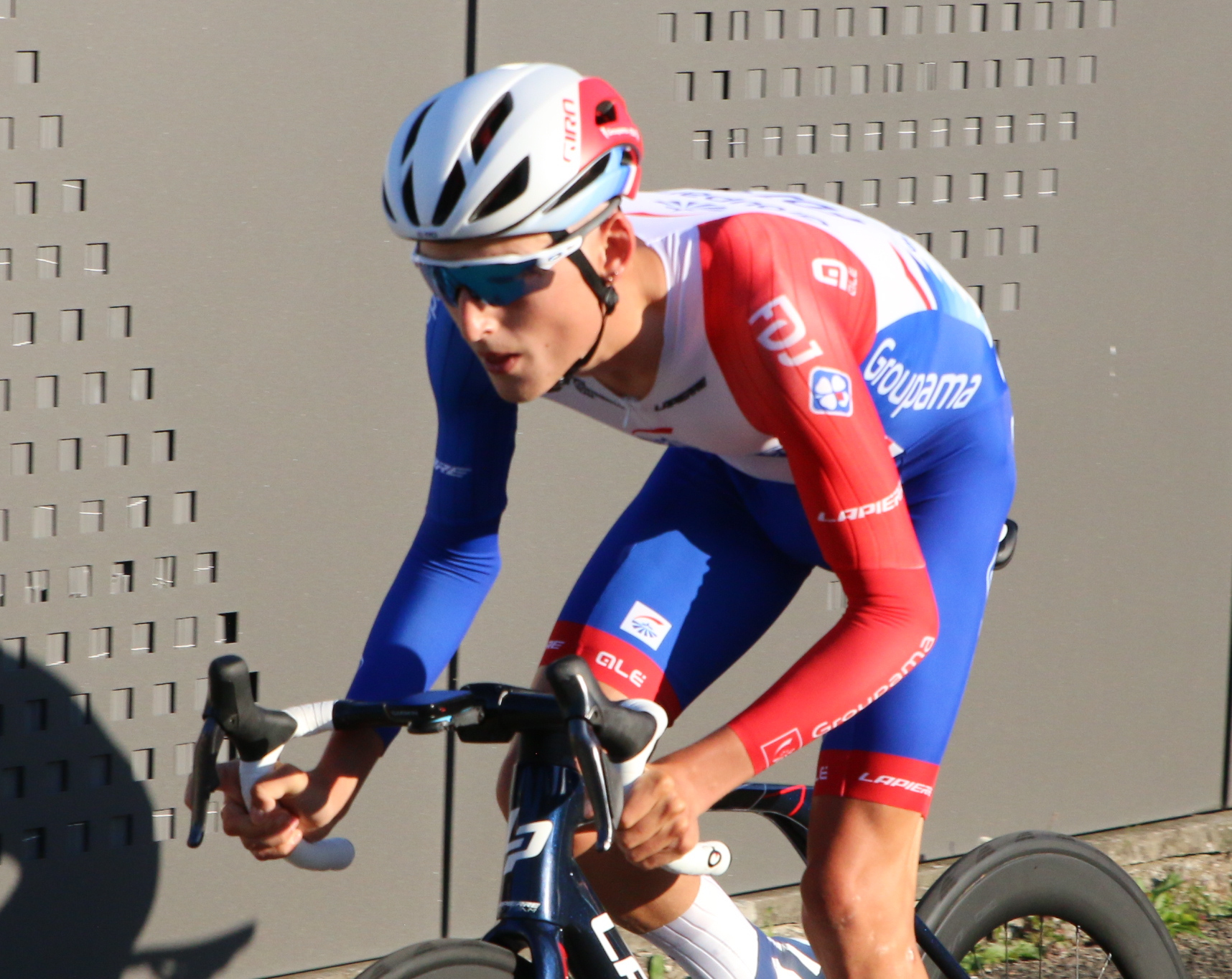

Personal information
- Born: 27 January 2003 (age 23) Cottingham, England
- Height: 1.74 m (5 ft 9 in)
- Weight: 55 kg (121 lb)

Cycling career
- Sport: Cycling
- Current team: Team Jayco–AIS
- Discipline: Road
- Role: Rider

Professional teams
- 2022: Équipe Continentale Groupama–FDJ
- 2023: Trinity Racing
- 2024–2025: Team Bahrain Victorious
- 2026-: Team Jayco–AlUla

Finlay Pickering (born 27 January 2003) is a British cyclist, who currently rides for UCI WorldTeam Team Jayco-AlUla.

== Major results ==
2021
1st Time trial, National Junior Road Championships
2nd Overall Grand Prix Rüebliland
2nd Trofeo Buffoni
7th Overall Junior Tour of Wales
8th Time trial, UCI Junior Road World Championships
2022
1st Overall Tour Alsace

1st Young rider classification
1st Stage 3

9th GP Capodarco
2023
1st Mountains classification, Alpes Isère Tour
2025
1st Mountains classification, Tour of the Alps
2026
9th Overall Tour of Austria

=== Grand Tour general classification results timeline ===
Grand Tour	2025
Giro d'Italia	—
Tour de France	—
Vuelta a España	29
