= Richard Menapace =

Austrian cyclist (1914–2000)

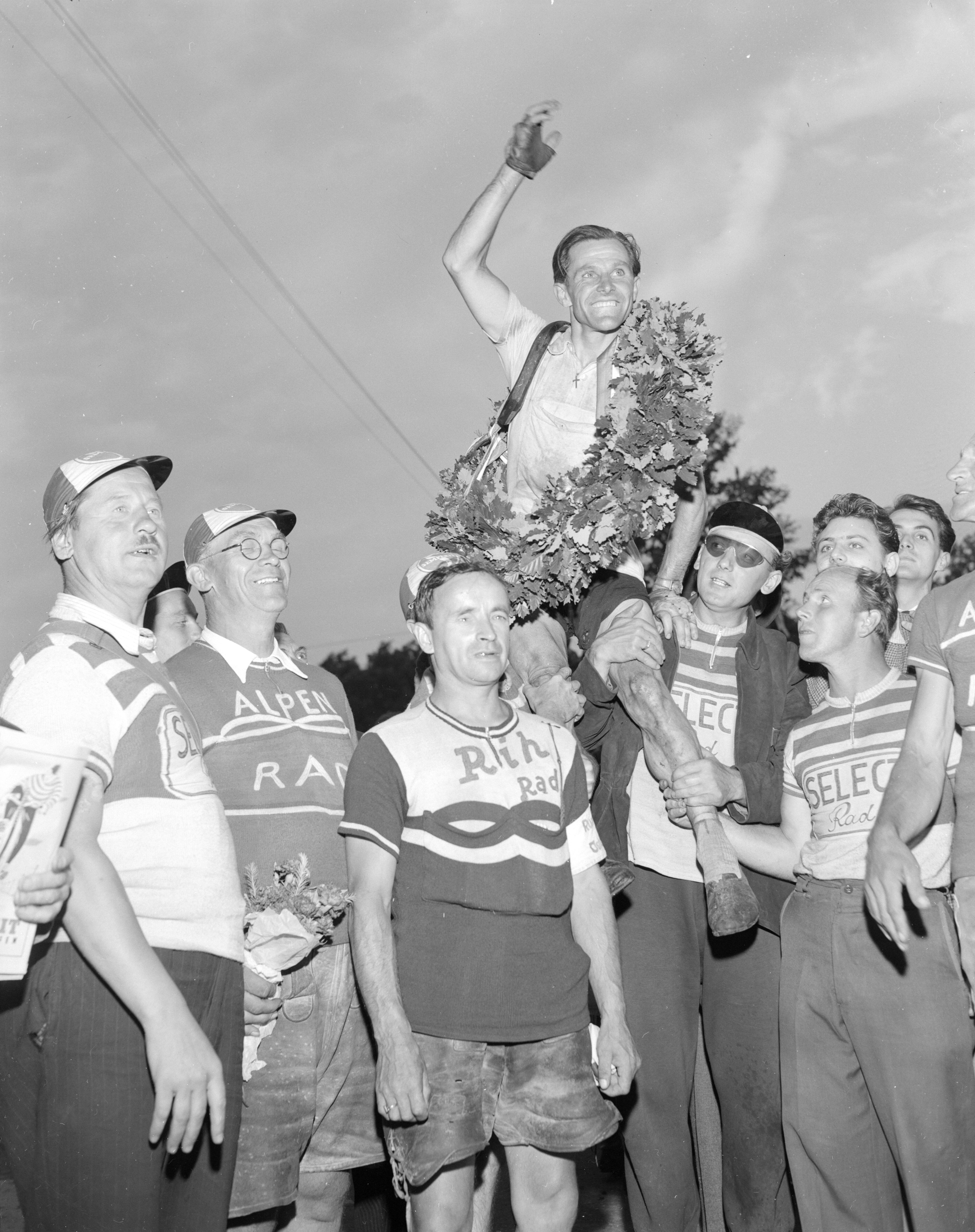
- Menapace after winning the inaugural 1949 Tour of Austria

Personal information
- Born: December 20, 1914; Tramin, Italy
- Died: April 21, 2000 (aged 85); Salzburg, Austria

Richard Menapace (born December 20, 1914, in Tramin; died April 21, 2000, in Salzburg) was an Austrian cyclist who competed in track and road races. He won both the 1949 and 1950 editions of the Tour of Austria, becoming the event's first winner.
