= Feldkirchen =

Feldkirchen may refer to:

== Places ==
=== In Austria ===
- Feldkirchen in Kärnten, in Carinthia
- Feldkirchen bei Mattighofen
- Feldkirchen an der Donau
- Feldkirchen bei Graz
- Feldkirchen (district), the district that surrounds Feldkirchen in Kärnten

=== In Germany ===
- Feldkirchen, Upper Bavaria, in the district of Munich, Bavaria
- Feldkirchen, Lower Bavaria, in the district of Straubing-Bogen, Bavaria
- Feldkirchen-Westerham, municipality in the district of Rosenheim, Bavaria
  - Feldkirchen (Feldkirchen-Westerham), village in the district of Rosenheim, Bavaria
- Feldkirchen, Neuwied, a district of Neuwied, Rhineland-Palatinate

== Other ==
- SV Feldkirchen, an Austrian football club

== See also ==
- Feldkirch (disambiguation)
