= Feldkirch =

Feldkirch may refer to:

== Places ==
- Feldkirch, Vorarlberg, a medieval city and capital of an administrative district in Austria
  - Feldkirch (district), an administrative division of Vorarlberg, Austria
- Feldkirch (Hartheim), a village in the municipality Hartheim, in Baden-Württemberg, Germany
- Feldkirch, Haut-Rhin, a commune (municipality) in France
- County of Feldkirch, a county in the Holy Roman Empire

== Other uses ==
- Battle of Feldkirch, a 1799 battle between Republican France and Habsburg Austria
- VEU Feldkirch, a professional ice hockey team from Feldkirch, Austria

== See also ==
- Feldkirchen (disambiguation)
