= Wolfgang Steinmayr =

Austrian cyclist (1944–2026)

Personal information
- Born: 6 September 1944 Innsbruck, Reichsgau Tirol-Vorarlberg, Germany
- Died: 19 May 2026 (aged 81)

Cycling career
- Sport: Cycling

Wolfgang Steinmayr (6 September 1944 – 19 May 2026) was an Austrian cyclist. He competed at the 1972 Summer Olympics and the 1976 Summer Olympics.

Steinmayr died on 19 May 2026, at the age of 81.
