= Kaiser-Franz-Josefs-Höhe =

Mountain in Austria

Coordinates: 47°04′31″N 12°45′04″E

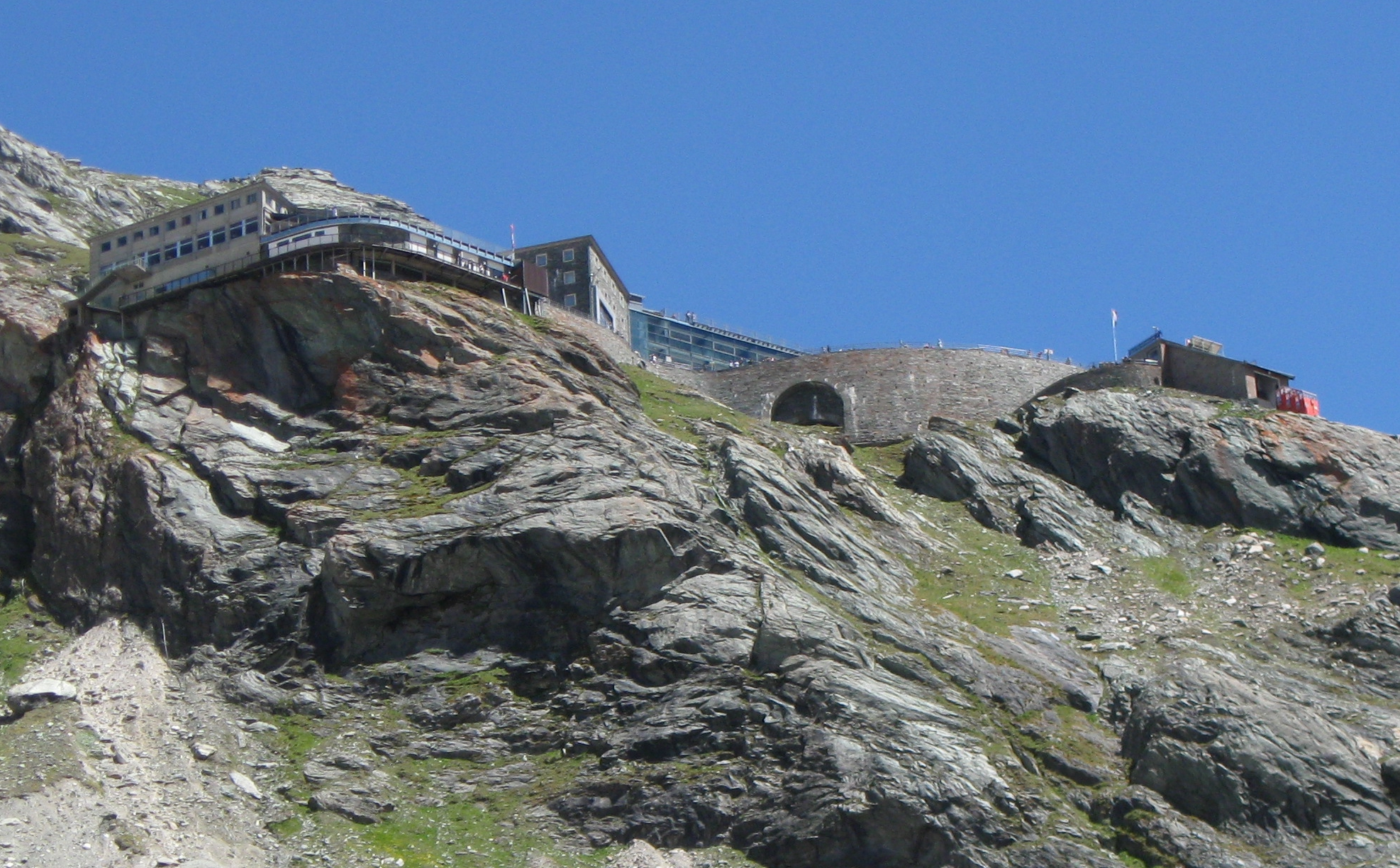
View of Kaiser-Franz-Josefs-Höhe

The Kaiser-Franz-Josefs-Höhe (often just Franz-Josefs-Höhe) is part of the Grossglockner High Alpine Road. The end point of a cul-de-sac and lookout point is in Austria in the Glockner Group in Carinthia at an altitude of 2,369 m (7,772 ft) above sea level. The Kaiser-Franz-Josefs-Höhe can only be reached by vehicle via the Grossglockner High Alpine Road, which is subject to a toll, from both Salzburg and Carinthia.
