= Team Jayco–AlUla (men's team) =

Australian men's professional cycling team

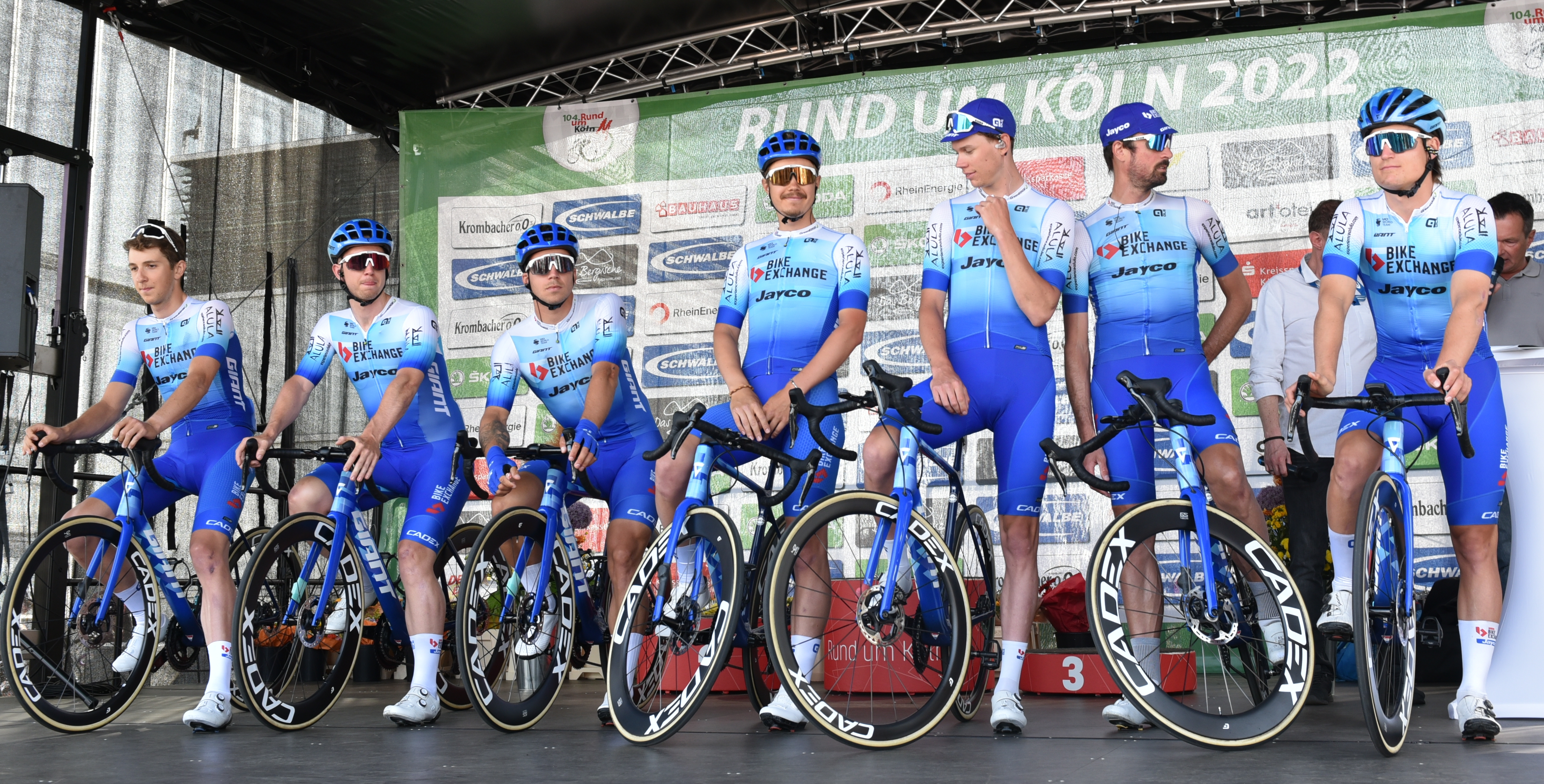
- The team at the 2022 Rund um Köln

Team information
- UCI code: JAY
- Registered: Australia
- Founded: 2011
- Discipline: Road
- Status: UCI WorldTeam
- Bicycles: Scott (2011–2020); Bianchi (2021); Giant (2022–)
- Components: Shimano
- Website: Team home page

Team name history
2012	GreenEDGE Cycling (GEC)
2012–2016	Orica–GreenEDGE (OGE)
2016	Orica–BikeExchange (OBE)
2017	Orica–Scott (ORS)
2018–2020	Mitchelton–Scott (MTS)
2021	Team BikeExchange (BEX)
2022	Team BikeExchange–Jayco (BEX)
2023–	Team Jayco–AlUla (JAY)

Team Jayco–AlUla (UCI team code: JAY) is an Australian professional road race cycling team. Launched in January 2011, it competes at UCI WorldTeam level. The team was formed under the management of Andrew Ryan and Shayne Bannan, with Neil Stephens and Matt White as Sporting Directors. The team rides Giant bicycles, and wear MAAP Cycling clothing.

The team has financial backing from Australian businessman Gerry Ryan who owns recreational vehicle manufacturer Jayco Australia. The current co-sponsor since 2023 is the Saudi Arabian city of al-Ula.

The team has a women's team and supports its riders competing in track cycling. In 2017 a development team, Mitchelton–BikeExchange was established.

In June 2016, ahead of the 2016 Tour de France the team announced BikeExchange, an Australian cycling retailer, was stepping up as a title sponsor of the team. Team owner Gerry Ryan had previously sought to secure further sponsorship after Orica announced it would stop sponsoring the team after the 2017 season. From 2018 until 2020, the team was known as Mitchelton–Scott, with Ryan's Mitchelton Wines as a major sponsor.

== History ==
=== Formation ===
The team was launched as 'GreenEDGE Cycling' on 17 January 2011 in Adelaide, South Australia, and signed a full complement of 30 riders. On 6 December 2011, the team was admitted by the UCI to the 2012 and 2013 World Tour seasons.

Orica, a multinational company that provides chemicals and explosives for the mining industry, was GreenEDGE's title sponsor. The team attracted Scott Sports as a bicycle supplier and Santini Maglificio Sportivo as suppliers of apparel.

=== 2012 ===
In January 2012, GreenEDGE made its debut in the Bay Classic Series in Victoria, Australia. Allan Davis won the men's classification racing for GreenEDGE's second team in the race, Mitchelton Wines/Lowe Farms, while Melissa Hoskins won the women's event. The following week Simon Gerrans won the Australian National Road Race Championships in Buninyong. He was one of 16 GreenEDGE riders in the race. Luke Durbridge won the time trial title ahead of GreenEDGE team-mate Cameron Meyer.

At the end of January, Gerrans won the Tour Down Under, picking up victory for GreenEDGE in its first World Tour event. The team won their first major European race in the team time trial of Tirreno–Adriatico following a near miss from Gerrans during Paris–Nice. GreenEDGE then won their first monument when, again, Simon Gerrans won Milan–San Remo in a 3 up sprint after following the key move over the top of the final climb.

=== 2013 ===
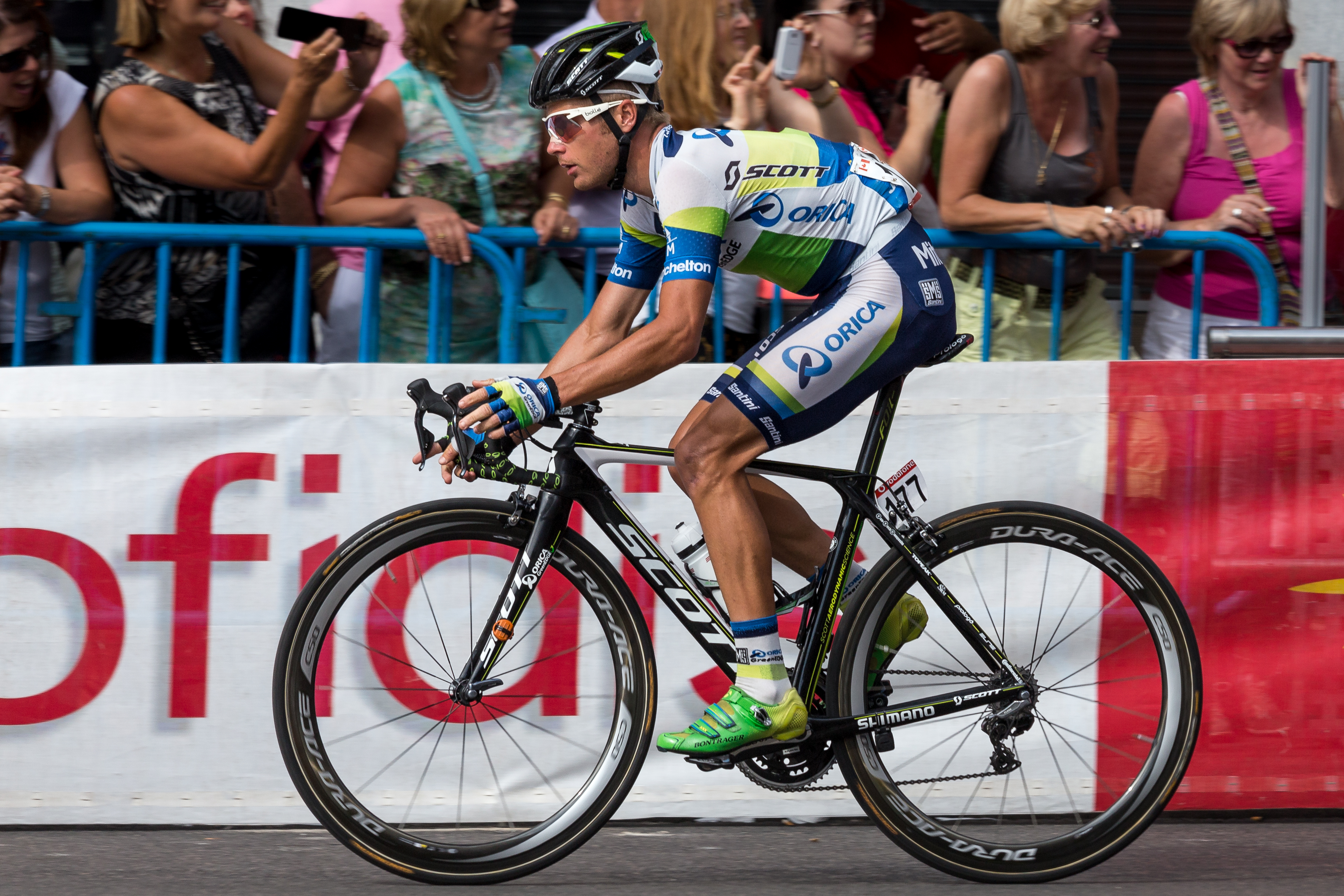
Christian Meier racing for Orica–GreenEDGE in Madrid.

Going into the 2013 season, Orica–GreenEDGE started at the Bay Classic Series in Victoria, Australia. Luke Durbridge won stage 2 and Mitchell Docker won the third and final stage. Defending Champion in the Women's Event Melissa Hoskins defended her title and picked up her first win in stage 3 of the Women's event.

With the defending champions in the Men's and Women's Time Trial and Road Race in the Australian National Road Race Championships Orica–GreenEDGE had high expectations to meet. Luke Durbridge went out and won the Time Trial on day one. Cameron Meyer followed that up with a solo break in the criterium. With the defending champion Simon Gerrans the favourite in the road race they were set for a clean sweep.

Luke Durbridge was part of an early break in the first few kilometers. As the race progressed the other riders of the break dropped off. Luke Durbridge rode the final lap and a half solo to win by over 1 minute. New signing for 2013 Michael Matthews sprinted home to make it a one-two and a clean sweep of the Nationals.

Orica–GreenEDGE had a very successful start to the 2013 Tour de France. After avoiding much of the carnage of the first two stages, Simon Gerrans won the 3rd stage. The next day, in the team time trial, Orica–GreenEDGE took out the stage by beating Omega Pharma–Quick-Step by 0.75 of a second. In the process, Gerrans took possession of the yellow jersey as the new race leader and held it for 2 days, then gave it up to teammate Daryl Impey for an additional two days.

=== 2014 ===
The team started the 2014 with success, tasting overall victory at the inaugural round of the 2014 UCI World Tour, the Tour Down Under – courtesy of Simon Gerrans. New recruit Adam Yates secured his first classification win with the young riders classification at the Tour de San Luis. Simon Clarke took the second overall victory, winning the Herald Sun Tour. In the remainder of the spring season, the team won a smattering of victories at the Tour of the Basque Country, Tour de Romandie, and Tour of Turkey. The team's most notable wins of the spring again came courtesy of Gerrans, who took victory at Liège–Bastogne–Liège. Adam Yates continued his good early season form, winning the overall classification of the Tour of Turkey, his first pro GC victory.

Entering the first Grand Tour of the year, the Giro d'Italia, the team targeted the stage win in the Team Time Trial and stage victories with Michael Matthews, who took victory on stage 6 into Montecassino. Pieter Weening took a surprise victory into Sestola on stage 9.

The team again took a smattering of stage wins as the season progressed through the summer, notching victories at the Tour de Suisse, Tour of Slovenia, GP Industria & Artigianato di Larciano and Giro di Toscana. As the season entered the second half, Matthews took a stage at the Vuelta a España, while Daryl Impey claimed the overall win in the Tour of Alberta. Gerrans won in the two Canadian one-day World Tour races: Grand Prix Cycliste de Québec and Grand Prix Cycliste de Montréal. The team's final victory came from Michael Albasini, at Tre Valli Varesine.

=== 2017 ===
The 2017 season for the Orica–Scott cycling team began in January at the Tour Down Under. As a UCI WorldTeam, they were automatically invited and obligated to send a squad to every event in the UCI World Tour.

== Doping ==
On 28 April 2016, Simon Yates returned an adverse analytical finding for Terbutaline. Yates had been prescribed the drug to treat asthma, but a therapeutic use exemption (TUE) request had not been filed. The team attributed this to an administrative error. The team took full responsibility for this error, emphasising that Yates had no fault in the occurrence.

== Media ==
The team is known for their online videos created by Dan Jones. Their channel has been successful due to their series "Backstage Pass" which gives viewers an insight into the team and the personalities in it. As of July 2016, Dan had made over 400 episodes of Backstage Pass. The channel had series such as "Bike Riders Can't Cook" and "Sunrise to Sunset" which showed fans a day in the life of a rider or staff member.

The total hits on the channel is currently over 16.5 million. One of the most successful videos so far was the team's version of Call Me Maybe by singer Carly Rae Jepsen. It has had over 1 million hits on YouTube and was used by Eurosport to introduce the coverage of the 16th stage of the 2012 Vuelta a España.

Neal Rogers from Velo News labelled the video "Possibly the single best PR move I've seen from a pro cycling team in years!

In 2013, they made a tribute video of AC/DC's song "You Shook Me All Night Long", though they were forced to remove it from their official channel after a complaint from the rights holders.

In 2014 Dan Jones created #SKYvOGE, a series where both Orica–GreenEDGE and Team Sky took part in a series of challenges off the bike which was also featured on Eurosport's cycling coverage of the 2014 Paris–Nice.

== Team roster ==
As of 13 August 2026.

Rider	Date of birth
Pascal Ackermann (GER)	17 January 1994 (age 32)
Koen Bouwman (NED)	2 December 1993 (age 32)
Amaury Capiot (BEL)	25 June 1993 (age 33)
Filippo Conca (ITA)	22 September 1998 (age 28)
Alessandro Covi (ITA)	28 September 1997 (age 29)
Dries De Bondt (BEL)	4 July 1991 (age 35)
Dries De Pooter (BEL)	8 November 2002 (age 24)
Davide De Pretto (ITA)	19 April 2002 (age 24)
Bob Donaldson (GBR)	8 April 2002 (age 24)
Paul Double (GBR)	25 June 1996 (age 30)
Luke Durbridge (AUS)	9 April 1991 (age 35)
Felix Engelhardt (GER)	19 August 2000 (age 26)
Anders Foldager (DEN)	27 July 2001 (age 25)
Patrick Gamper (AUT)	18 February 1997 (age 29)
Alan Hatherly (RSA)	15 March 1996 (age 30)

Rider	Date of birth
Asbjørn Hellemose (DEN)	15 January 1999 (age 27)
Christopher Juul-Jensen (DEN)	6 July 1989 (age 37)
Jelte Krijnsen (NED)	12 May 2001 (age 25)
Michael Matthews (AUS)	26 September 1990 (age 36)
Hamish McKenzie (AUS)	13 September 2004 (age 22)
Luka Mezgec (SLO)	27 June 1988 (age 38)
Kelland O'Brien (AUS)	22 May 1998 (age 28)
Ben O'Connor (AUS)	25 November 1995 (age 30)
Finlay Pickering (GBR)	27 January 2003 (age 23)
Luke Plapp (AUS)	25 December 2000 (age 25)
Rudy Porter (AUS)	15 December 2000 (age 25)
Mauro Schmid (SUI)	4 December 1999 (age 26)
Jasha Sütterlin (GER)	4 November 1992 (age 34)
Andrea Vendrame (ITA)	20 July 1994 (age 32)

== National, continental & world champions ==
2012
Australian Road Race Simon Gerrans
Australian Time Trial Luke Durbridge
Canadian Time Trial Svein Tuft
Eritrean Road Race Daniel Teklehaymanot
Eritrean Time Trial Daniel Teklehaymanot
African Time Trial Daniel Teklehaymanot
2013
Australian Road Race Luke Durbridge
Australian Time Trial Luke Durbridge
Australian Criterium, Cameron Meyer
South African Time Trial Daryl Impey
Oceania Road Race Cameron Meyer
Lithuanian Road Race Tomas Vaitkus
African Time Trial Daniel Teklehaymanot
2014
Australian Time Trial Michael Hepburn
Australian Road Race Simon Gerrans
South African Time Trial Daryl Impey
Oceania Road Race Luke Durbridge
Canadian Time Trial Svein Tuft
Canadian Road Race Svein Tuft
2015
South African Time Trial Daryl Impey
Oceania Time Trial Michael Hepburn
2016
Australian Criterium, Caleb Ewan
South African Time Trial Daryl Impey
Hong Kong Time Trial, Cheung King Lok
Hong Kong Road Race, Cheung King Lok
2017
Australian Criterium, Caleb Ewan
South African Time Trial Daryl Impey
Chinese Time Trial, Cheung King Lok
Slovenian Road Race Luka Mezgec
Canadian Time Trial Svein Tuft
Slovenian Cross Country Mountainbike Luka Mezgec
Slovenian Cyclo-cross Luka Mezgec
2018
Australian Criterium, Caleb Ewan
Australian Road Race Alexander Edmondson
South African Time Trial Daryl Impey
South African Road Race Daryl Impey
World Track (Points race), Cameron Meyer
Canadian Time Trial Svein Tuft
European Road Race Matteo Trentin
2019
Australian Time Trial Luke Durbridge
South African Time Trial Daryl Impey
South African Road Race Daryl Impey
Ethiopian Time Trial Tsgabu Grmay
2020
Australian Time Trial Luke Durbridge
Australian Road Race Cameron Meyer
South African Time Trial Daryl Impey
Hungarian Time Trial Barnabás Peák
2021
Australian Criterium, Kaden Groves
Australian Road Race Cameron Meyer
2022
American Time Trial, Lawson Craddock
2023
Australian Criterium, Kelland O'Brien
Ethiopian Time Trial Tsgabu Grmay
2024
Australian Time Trial Luke Plapp
Australian Road Race Luke Plapp
2025
Australian Time Trial Luke Plapp
Australian Road Race Luke Durbridge
South African Time Trial Alan Hatherly

== See also ==
- Cycling Australia
