= List of teams and cyclists in the 2025 Vuelta a España =

List of cyclists

The following is a list of teams and cyclists who participated in the 2025 Vuelta a España.

== Teams ==
Twenty-three teams took part in the race. All 18 UCI WorldTeams were automatically invited. They were joined by five UCI ProTeams: the two highest-ranked UCI ProTeams in 2024 (Lotto and Israel–Premier Tech), along with three teams selected by Unipublic, the organisers of the Tour.

Union Cycliste Internationale (UCI) rules allow twenty-two teams to enter a Grand Tour – eighteen UCI WorldTeams, the two highest-ranked UCI ProTeams from the previous season and two teams invited by the organisers. Grand Tour race organisers ASO and RCS Sport asked the UCI to allow an additional wildcard team to be invited to Grand Tour events, after lobbying from smaller teams competing for the wildcard slots. Larger teams were reported to not support the request. In March 2025, the UCI announced that twenty-three teams would be permitted in 2025, allowing an additional team to be invited.

UCI WorldTeams

- Alpecin–Deceuninck
- Arkéa–B&B Hotels
- Cofidis
- Decathlon–AG2R La Mondiale
- EF Education–EasyPost
- Groupama–FDJ
- INEOS Grenadiers
- Intermarché–Wanty
- Lidl–Trek
- Movistar Team
- Red Bull–Bora–Hansgrohe
- Soudal–Quick-Step
- Team Bahrain Victorious
- Team Jayco–AlUla
- Team Picnic–PostNL
- UAE Team Emirates XRG
- Visma–Lease a Bike
- XDS Astana Team

UCI ProTeams

- Burgos Burpellet BH
- Caja Rural–Seguros RGA
- Israel–Premier Tech
- Lotto
- Q36.5 Pro Cycling Team

== Cyclists ==
Legend
No.	Starting number worn by the rider during the Vuelta
Pos.	Position in the general classification
Time	Deficit to the winner of the general classification
‡	Denotes riders born on or after 1 January 2000, and thus eligible for the young rider classification
	Denotes the winner of the general classification
	Denotes the winner of the points classification
	Denotes the winner of the mountains classification
	Denotes the winner of the young rider classification
	Denotes the winner of the team classification
	Denotes the winner of the combativity award
DNS	Denotes a rider who did not start, followed by the stage before which he withdrew
DNF	Denotes a rider who did not finish, followed by the stage in which he withdrew
DSQ	Denotes a rider who was disqualified from the race, followed by the stage in which this occurred
OTL	Denotes a rider who finished outside the time limit, followed by the stage in which he did so
Ages correct as of Saturday 23 August 2025, the date on which the Vuelta began

=== By starting number ===
No.	Name	Nationality	Team	Age	Pos.	Time
1	João Almeida	Portugal	UAE Team Emirates XRG	27	2	+ 1' 16"
2	Juan Ayuso ‡	Spain	UAE Team Emirates XRG	22	68	+ 2h 47' 57"
3	Mikkel Bjerg	Denmark	UAE Team Emirates XRG	26	139	+ 4h 20' 41"
4	Felix Großschartner	Austria	UAE Team Emirates XRG	31	25	+ 1h 09' 30"
5	Domen Novak	Slovenia	UAE Team Emirates XRG	30	144	+ 4h 32' 39"
6	Ivo Oliveira	Portugal	UAE Team Emirates XRG	28	109	+ 3h 31' 41"
7	Marc Soler	Spain	UAE Team Emirates XRG	31	26	+ 1h 11' 14"
8	Jay Vine	Australia	UAE Team Emirates XRG	29	30	+ 1h 27' 41"
11	Jonas Vingegaard	Denmark	Visma–Lease a Bike	28	1	74h 20' 28"
12	Axel Zingle	France	Visma–Lease a Bike	26	DNS-3	–
13	Victor Campenaerts	Belgium	Visma–Lease a Bike	33	DNS-16	–
14	Matteo Jorgenson	United States	Visma–Lease a Bike	26	10	+ 12' 16"
15	Wilco Kelderman	Netherlands	Visma–Lease a Bike	34	62	+ 2h 38' 47"
16	Sepp Kuss	United States	Visma–Lease a Bike	30	7	+ 7' 45"
17	Ben Tulett ‡	Great Britain	Visma–Lease a Bike	23	24	+ 1h 04' 46"
18	Dylan van Baarle	Netherlands	Visma–Lease a Bike	33	130	+ 4h 08' 16"
21	Andrea Bagioli	Italy	Lidl–Trek	32	38	+ 1h 57' 31"
22	Julien Bernard	France	Lidl–Trek	32	33	+ 1h 39' 06"
23	Giulio Ciccone	Italy	Lidl–Trek	30	18	+ 48' 17"
24	Amanuel Ghebreigzabhier	Eritrea	Lidl–Trek	31	135	+ 4h 39' 29"
25	Daan Hoole	Netherlands	Lidl–Trek	26	149	+ 4h 44' 12"
26	Søren Kragh Andersen	Denmark	Lidl–Trek	31	148	+ 4h 43' 07"
27	Mads Pedersen	Denmark	Lidl–Trek	29	125	+ 3h 56' 59"
28	Carlos Verona	Spain	Lidl–Trek	32	60	+ 2h 32' 57"
31	Jorge Arcas	Spain	Movistar Team	33	DNS-3	–
32	Orluis Aular	Venezuela	Movistar Team	28	88	+ 3h 11' 02"
33	Carlos Canal ‡	Spain	Movistar Team	23	55	+ 2h 28' 38"
34	Pablo Castrillo ‡	Spain	Movistar Team	24	DNF-13	–
35	Jefferson Alveiro Cepeda	Ecuador	Movistar Team	29	34	+ 1h 43' 22"
36	Iván García Cortina	Spain	Movistar Team	29	107	+ 3h 28' 55"
37	Michel Hessmann ‡	Germany	Movistar Team	24	72	+ 2h 51' 52"
38	Javier Romo	Spain	Movistar Team	26	DNF-16	–
41	Jai Hindley	Australia	Red Bull–Bora–Hansgrohe	29	4	+ 3' 41"
42	Giovanni Aleotti	Italy	Red Bull–Bora–Hansgrohe	26	56	+ 2h 28' 38"
43	Nico Denz	Germany	Red Bull–Bora–Hansgrohe	31	87	+ 3h 10' 43"
44	Finn Fisher-Black ‡	New Zealand	Red Bull–Bora–Hansgrohe	23	84	+ 3h 05' 04"
45	Giulio Pellizzari ‡	Italy	Red Bull–Bora–Hansgrohe	21	6	+ 7' 23"
46	Matteo Sobrero	Italy	Red Bull–Bora–Hansgrohe	28	122	+ 3h 53' 01"
47	Tim van Dijke ‡	Netherlands	Red Bull–Bora–Hansgrohe	25	138	+ 4h 20' 23"
48	Ben Zwiehoff	Germany	Red Bull–Bora–Hansgrohe	31	51	+ 2h 22' 31"
51	Mikel Landa	Spain	Soudal–Quick-Step	35	27	+ 1h 18' 26"
52	Junior Lecerf ‡	Belgium	Soudal–Quick-Step	22	11	+ 14' 00"
53	Valentin Paret-Peintre ‡	France	Soudal–Quick-Step	24	DNF-4	–
54	Pepijn Reinderink ‡	Netherlands	Soudal–Quick-Step	23	DNS-6	–
55	Max Schachmann	Germany	Soudal–Quick-Step	31	74	+ 2h 54' 04"
56	Mauri Vansevenant	Belgium	Soudal–Quick-Step	26	73	+ 2h 53' 57"
57	Louis Vervaeke	Belgium	Soudal–Quick-Step	31	37	+ 1h 50' 12"
58	Gianmarco Garofoli ‡	Italy	Soudal–Quick-Step	22	DNS-16	–
61	Magnus Sheffield ‡	United States	INEOS Grenadiers	23	65	+ 2h 44' 56"
62	Egan Bernal	Colombia	INEOS Grenadiers	28	17	+ 46' 26"
63	Filippo Ganna	Italy	INEOS Grenadiers	29	131	+ 4h 08' 59"
64	Bob Jungels	Luxembourg	INEOS Grenadiers	32	44	+ 2h 04'14"
65	Michał Kwiatkowski	Poland	INEOS Grenadiers	35	83	+ 3h 02' 25"
66	Victor Langellotti	Monaco	INEOS Grenadiers	30	59	+ 2h 32' 10"
67	Brandon Rivera	Colombia	INEOS Grenadiers	29	81	+ 3h 01' 23"
68	Ben Turner	Great Britain	INEOS Grenadiers	26	127	+ 4h 06' 04"
71	Jasper Philipsen	Belgium	Alpecin–Deceuninck	27	145	+ 4h 35' 03"
72	Tobias Bayer	Austria	Alpecin–Deceuninck	25	132	+ 4h 10' 00"
73	Ramses Debruyne ‡	Belgium	Alpecin–Deceuninck	22	DNS-11	–
74	Gal Glivar ‡	Slovenia	Alpecin–Deceuninck	23	DNS-11	–
75	Edward Planckaert	Belgium	Alpecin–Deceuninck	30	119	+ 3h 44' 23"
76	Jonas Rickaert	Belgium	Alpecin–Deceuninck	31	106	+ 3h 28' 01"
77	Oscar Riesebeek	Netherlands	Alpecin–Deceuninck	32	153	+ 5h 08' 37"
78	Luca Vergallito	Italy	Alpecin–Deceuninck	27	DNF-7	–
81	Esteban Chaves	Colombia	EF Education–EasyPost	35	DNF-12	–
82	Markel Beloki ‡	Spain	EF Education–EasyPost	20	50	+ 2h 21' 45"
83	Madis Mihkels ‡	Estonia	EF Education–EasyPost	22	126	+ 4h 00' 51"
84	Lukas Nerurkar ‡	Great Britain	EF Education–EasyPost	21	104	+ 3h 24' 13"
85	Sean Quinn ‡	United States	EF Education–EasyPost	25	75	+ 2h 55' 04"
86	Archie Ryan ‡	Ireland	EF Education–EasyPost	23	DNS-13	–
87	James Shaw	Great Britain	EF Education–EasyPost	29	66	+ 2h 46' 06"
88	Jardi van der Lee ‡	Netherlands	EF Education–EasyPost	24	93	+ 3h 14' 12"
91	Felix Gall	Austria	Decathlon–AG2R La Mondiale	27	8	+ 7' 50"
92	Bruno Armirail	France	Decathlon–AG2R La Mondiale	31	19	+ 48' 30"
93	Léo Bisiaux ‡	France	Decathlon–AG2R La Mondiale	20	52	+ 2h 22' 33"
94	Sander De Pestel	Belgium	Decathlon–AG2R La Mondiale	26	61	+ 2h 33' 33"
95	Jordan Labrosse ‡	France	Decathlon–AG2R La Mondiale	22	85	+ 3h 09' 59"
96	Nans Peters	France	Decathlon–AG2R La Mondiale	31	86	+ 3h 10' 09"
97	Callum Scotson	Australia	Decathlon–AG2R La Mondiale	29	46	+ 2h 09' 37"
98	Johannes Staune-Mittet ‡	Norway	Decathlon–AG2R La Mondiale	23	42	+ 2h 01' 41"
101	Antonio Tiberi ‡	Italy	Team Bahrain Victorious	24	41	+ 2h 01' 24"
102	Santiago Buitrago	Colombia	Team Bahrain Victorious	25	15	+ 45' 38"
103	Nicolò Buratti ‡	Italy	Team Bahrain Victorious	24	117	+ 3h 42' 13"
104	Roman Ermakov ‡		Team Bahrain Victorious	20	79	+ 2h 58' 48"
105	Jack Haig	Australia	Team Bahrain Victorious	31	80	+ 2h 59' 42"
106	Mathijs Paasschens	Netherlands	Team Bahrain Victorious	29	82	+ 3h 01' 46"
107	Finlay Pickering ‡	Great Britain	Team Bahrain Victorious	22	29	+ 1h 22' 02"
108	Torstein Træen	Norway	Team Bahrain Victorious	30	9	+ 9' 48"
111	Tom Pidcock	Great Britain	Q36.5 Pro Cycling Team	26	3	+ 3' 11"
112	David de la Cruz	Spain	Q36.5 Pro Cycling Team	36	102	+ 3h 21' 52"
113	Xabier Azparren	Spain	Q36.5 Pro Cycling Team	26	DNF-17	–
114	Fabio Christen ‡	Switzerland	Q36.5 Pro Cycling Team	23	133	+ 4h 11' 52"
115	Damien Howson	Australia	Q36.5 Pro Cycling Team	33	28	+ 1h 19' 07"
116	Nickolas Zukowsky	Canada	Q36.5 Pro Cycling Team	27	112	+ 3h 38' 01"
117	David González	Spain	Q36.5 Pro Cycling Team	29	67	+ 2h 47' 42"
118	Marcel Camprubí ‡	Spain	Q36.5 Pro Cycling Team	23	114	+ 3h 39' 36"
121	Harold Tejada	Colombia	XDS Astana Team	26	12	+ 21' 31"
122	Nicola Conci	Italy	XDS Astana Team	28	71	+ 2h 51' 32"
123	Lorenzo Fortunato	Italy	XDS Astana Team	29	48	+ 2h 15' 02"
124	Sergio Higuita	Colombia	XDS Astana Team	28	DNS-14	–
125	Harold Martín López ‡	Ecuador	XDS Astana Team	24	22	+ 59' 23"
126	Fausto Masnada	Italy	XDS Astana Team	31	40	+ 2h 01' 00"
127	Wout Poels	Netherlands	XDS Astana Team	37	36	+ 1h 48' 56"
128	Nicolya Vinokurov ‡	Kazakhstan	XDS Astana Team	23	105	+ 3h 26' 40"
131	Clément Braz Afonso	France	Groupama–FDJ	25	35	+ 1h 43' 34"
132	Rémi Cavagna	France	Groupama–FDJ	30	124	+ 3h 55' 18"
133	David Gaudu	France	Groupama–FDJ	28	97	+ 3h 16' 55"
134	Thibaud Gruel ‡	France	Groupama–FDJ	21	103	+ 3h 24' 03"
135	Guillaume Martin	France	Groupama–FDJ	32	DNF-2	–
136	Rudy Molard	France	Groupama–FDJ	35	23	+ 1h 00' 51"
137	Brieuc Rolland ‡	France	Groupama–FDJ	22	45	+ 2h 04' 21"
138	Stefan Küng	Switzerland	Groupama–FDJ	31	76	+ 2h 55' 41"
141	Guillermo Thomas Silva ‡	Uruguay	Caja Rural–Seguros RGA	23	78	+ 2h 58' 10"
142	Abel Balderstone ‡	Spain	Caja Rural–Seguros RGA	25	13	+ 28' 07"
143	Fernando Barceló	Spain	Caja Rural–Seguros RGA	29	DNF-13	–
144	Joan Bou	Spain	Caja Rural–Seguros RGA	28	64	+ 2h 43' 12"
145	Jaume Guardeño ‡	Spain	Caja Rural–Seguros RGA	22	14	+ 30' 30"
146	Alex Molenaar	Netherlands	Caja Rural–Seguros RGA	26	70	+ 2h 50' 43"
147	Joel Nicolau	Spain	Caja Rural–Seguros RGA	27	111	+ 3h 36' 13"
148	Jakub Otruba	Czech Republic	Caja Rural–Seguros RGA	26	90	+ 3h 12' 26"
151	Ben O'Connor	Australia	Team Jayco–AlUla	29	DNF-13	–
152	Koen Bouwman	Netherlands	Team Jayco–AlUla	31	DNF-6	–
153	Eddie Dunbar	Ireland	Team Jayco–AlUla	28	21	+ 57' 19"
154	Anders Foldager ‡	Denmark	Team Jayco–AlUla	24	147	+ 4h 43' 01"
155	Patrick Gamper	Austria	Team Jayco–AlUla	28	100	+ 3h 18' 44"
156	Chris Harper	Australia	Team Jayco–AlUla	30	DNF-11	–
157	Christopher Juul-Jensen	Denmark	Team Jayco–AlUla	36	110	+ 3h 32' 28"
158	Kelland O'Brien	Australia	Team Jayco–AlUla	27	94	+ 3h 14' 30"
161	Raúl García Pierna ‡	Spain	Arkéa–B&B Hotels	24	DNF-10	–
162	Jenthe Biermans	Belgium	Arkéa–B&B Hotels	29	143	+ 4h 32' 15"
163	Victor Guernalec ‡	France	Arkéa–B&B Hotels	25	121	+ 3h 52' 49"
164	Léandre Lozouet ‡	France	Arkéa–B&B Hotels	20	120	+ 3h 49' 26"
165	Cristián Rodríguez	Spain	Arkéa–B&B Hotels	30	DNS-7	–
166	Louis Rouland ‡	France	Arkéa–B&B Hotels	22	99	+ 3h 17' 20"
167	Alessandro Verre ‡	Italy	Arkéa–B&B Hotels	23	113	+ 3h 38' 20"
168	Pierre Thierry ‡	France	Arkéa–B&B Hotels	22	39	+ 1h 59' 17"
171	Emanuel Buchmann	Germany	Cofidis	32	98	+ 3h 17' 06"
172	Sergio Samitier	Spain	Cofidis	29	31	+ 1h 33' 20"
173	Stanisław Aniołkowski	Poland	Cofidis	28	152	+ 4h 57' 02"
174	Simon Carr	Great Britain	Cofidis	26	DNS-6	–
175	Bryan Coquard	France	Cofidis	33	136	+ 4h 15' 14"
176	Jesús Herrada	Spain	Cofidis	35	77	+ 2h 56' 36"
177	Oliver Knight ‡	Great Britain	Cofidis	24	DNF-8	–
178	Paul Ourselin	France	Cofidis	31	DNS-11	–
181	Huub Artz ‡	Netherlands	Intermarché–Wanty	23	116	+ 3h 42' 02"
182	Kamiel Bonneu	Belgium	Intermarché–Wanty	26	115	+ 3h 40' 58"
183	Dries De Pooter ‡	Belgium	Intermarché–Wanty	22	128	+ 4h 07' 09"
184	Arne Marit	Belgium	Intermarché–Wanty	26	146	+ 4h 36' 51
185	Louis Meintjes	South Africa	Intermarché–Wanty	33	16	+ 45' 39"
186	Simone Petilli	Italy	Intermarché–Wanty	32	95	+ 3h 15' 26"
187	Dion Smith	New Zealand	Intermarché–Wanty	32	123	+ 3h 53' 08"
188	Luca Van Boven ‡	Belgium	Intermarché–Wanty	25	118	+ 3h 42' 14"
191	Patrick Eddy ‡	Australia	Team Picnic–PostNL	22	151	+ 4h 54' 07"
192	Chris Hamilton	Australia	Team Picnic–PostNL	30	53	+ 2h 25' 56"
193	Bjoern Koerdt ‡	Great Britain	Team Picnic–PostNL	21	92	+ 3h 39' 49"
194	Gijs Leemreize	Netherlands	Team Picnic–PostNL	25	49	+ 3h 13' 49"
195	Juan Guillermo Martínez ‡	Colombia	Team Picnic–PostNL	20	54	+ 2h 27' 08"
196	Timo Roosen	Netherlands	Team Picnic–PostNL	32	137	+ 4h 20' 23"
197	Casper van Uden ‡	Netherlands	Team Picnic–PostNL	24	DNS-10	–
198	Kevin Vermaerke ‡	United States	Team Picnic–PostNL	24	20	+ 50' 08"
201	Lars Craps ‡	Belgium	Lotto	23	57	+ 2h 29' 14"
202	Jasper De Buyst	Belgium	Lotto	31	140	+ 4h 21' 15"
203	Arjen Livyns	Belgium	Lotto	30	DNS-6	–
204	Alec Segaert ‡	Belgium	Lotto	22	96	+ 3h 16' 15"
205	Eduardo Sepúlveda	Argentina	Lotto	34	58	+ 2h 30' 57"
206	Liam Slock ‡	Belgium	Lotto	24	134	+ 4h 11' 58"
207	Elia Viviani	Italy	Lotto	36	150	+ 4h 44' 32"
208	Jonas Gregaard	Denmark	Lotto	29	89	+ 3h 11' 10"
211	Mario Aparicio ‡	Spain	Burgos Burpellet BH	25	91	+ 3h 12' 44"
212	Sergio Chumil ‡	Guatemala	Burgos Burpellet BH	24	69	+ 2h 49' 38"
213	Eric Fagúndez	Uruguay	Burgos Burpellet BH	27	DNF-8	–
214	José Luis Faura ‡	Spain	Burgos Burpellet BH	24	47	+ 2h 13' 57"
215	Hugo de la Calle ‡	Spain	Burgos Burpellet BH	21	63	+ 2h 42' 30"
216	Carlos García Pierna	Spain	Burgos Burpellet BH	26	DNF-4	–
217	Sinuhé Fernández ‡	Spain	Burgos Burpellet BH	25	DNF-12	–
218	Daniel Cavia ‡	Spain	Burgos Burpellet BH	23	DNF-7	–
221	George Bennett	New Zealand	Israel–Premier Tech	35	DNF-8	–
222	Pier-André Côté	Canada	Israel–Premier Tech	28	108	+ 3h 31' 36"
223	Marco Frigo ‡	Italy	Israel–Premier Tech	25	32	+ 1h 34' 17"
224	Jan Hirt	Czech Republic	Israel–Premier Tech	34	43	+ 2h 01' 43"
225	Nadav Raisberg ‡	Israel	Israel–Premier Tech	24	141	+ 4h 24' 53"
226	Jake Stewart	Great Britain	Israel–Premier Tech	25	129	+ 4h 08' 08"
227	Ethan Vernon ‡	Great Britain	Israel–Premier Tech	24	142	+ 4h 31' 47"
228	Matthew Riccitello ‡	United States	Israel–Premier Tech	23	5	+ 5' 55"

=== By team ===
(United Arab Emirates) UAE Team Emirates XRG (UAD)
No.	Rider	Pos.
1	João Almeida (POR)	2
2	Juan Ayuso (ESP)	68
3	Mikkel Bjerg (DEN)	139
4	Felix Großschartner (AUT)	25
5	Domen Novak (SLO)	144
6	Ivo Oliveira (POR)	109
7	Marc Soler (ESP)	26
8	Jay Vine (AUS)	30

(Netherlands) Visma–Lease a Bike (TVL)
No.	Rider	Pos.
11	Jonas Vingegaard (DEN)	1
12	Axel Zingle (FRA)	DNS-3
13	Victor Campenaerts (BEL)	DNS-16
14	Matteo Jorgenson (USA)	10
15	Wilco Kelderman (NED)	62
16	Sepp Kuss (USA)	7
17	Ben Tulett (GBR)	24
18	Dylan van Baarle (NED)	130

(United States) Lidl–Trek (LTK)
No.	Rider	Pos.
21	Andrea Bagioli (ITA)	38
22	Julien Bernard (FRA)	33
23	Giulio Ciccone (ITA)	18
24	Amanuel Ghebreigzabhier (ERI)	135
25	Daan Hoole (NED)	149
26	Søren Kragh Andersen (DEN)	148
27	Mads Pedersen (DEN)	125
28	Carlos Verona (ESP)	60

(Spain) Movistar Team (MOV)
No.	Rider	Pos.
31	Jorge Arcas (ESP)	DNS-3
32	Orluis Aular (VEN)	88
33	Carlos Canal (ESP)	55
34	Pablo Castrillo (ESP)	DNF-13
35	Jefferson Alveiro Cepeda (ECU)	34
36	Iván García Cortina (ESP)	107
37	Michel Hessmann (GER)	72
38	Javier Romo (ESP)	DNF-16

(Germany) Red Bull–Bora–Hansgrohe (RBH)
No.	Rider	Pos.
41	Jai Hindley (AUS)	4
42	Giovanni Aleotti (ITA)	56
43	Nico Denz (GER)	87
44	Finn Fisher-Black (NZL)	84
45	Giulio Pellizzari (ITA)	6
46	Matteo Sobrero (ITA)	122
47	Tim van Dijke (NED)	138
48	Ben Zwiehoff (GER)	51

(Belgium) Soudal–Quick-Step (SOQ)
No.	Rider	Pos.
51	Mikel Landa (ESP)	27
52	Junior Lecerf (BEL)	11
53	Valentin Paret-Peintre (FRA)	DNF-4
54	Pepijn Reinderink (NED)	DNS-6
55	Maximilian Schachmann (GER)	74
56	Mauri Vansevenant (BEL)	73
57	Louis Vervaeke (BEL)	37
58	Gianmarco Garofoli (ITA)	DNS-16

(United Kingdom) INEOS Grenadiers (IGD)
No.	Rider	Pos.
61	Magnus Sheffield (USA)	65
62	Egan Bernal (COL)	17
63	Filippo Ganna (ITA)	131
64	Bob Jungels (LUX)	44
65	Michał Kwiatkowski (POL)	83
66	Victor Langellotti (MON)	59
67	Brandon Rivera (COL)	81
68	Ben Turner (GBR)	127

(Belgium) Alpecin–Deceuninck (ADC)
No.	Rider	Pos.
71	Jasper Philipsen (BEL)	145
72	Tobias Bayer (AUT)	132
73	Ramses Debruyne (BEL)	DNS-11
74	Gal Glivar (SLO)	101
75	Edward Planckaert (BEL)	119
76	Jonas Rickaert (BEL)	106
77	Oscar Riesebeek (NED)	153
78	Luca Vergallito (ITA)	DNF-7

(United States) EF Education–EasyPost (EFE)
No.	Rider	Pos.
81	Esteban Chaves (COL)	DNF-12
82	Markel Beloki (ESP)	50
83	Madis Mihkels (EST)	126
84	Lukas Nerurkar (GBR)	104
85	Sean Quinn (USA)	75
86	Archie Ryan (IRL)	DNS-13
87	James Shaw (GBR)	66
88	Jardi van der Lee (NED)	93

(France) Decathlon–AG2R La Mondiale (DAT)
No.	Rider	Pos.
91	Felix Gall (AUT)	8
92	Bruno Armirail (FRA)	19
93	Léo Bisiaux (FRA)	52
94	Sander De Pestel (BEL)	61
95	Jordan Labrosse (FRA)	85
96	Nans Peters (FRA)	86
97	Callum Scotson (AUS)	46
98	Johannes Staune-Mittet (NOR)	42

Team Bahrain Victorious (TBV)
No.	Rider	Pos.
101	Antonio Tiberi (ITA)	41
102	Santiago Buitrago (COL)	15
103	Nicolò Buratti (ITA)	117
104	Roman Ermakov	79
105	Jack Haig (AUS)	80
106	Mathijs Paasschens (NED)	82
107	Finlay Pickering (GBR)	29
108	Torstein Træen (NOR)	9

(Switzerland) Q36.5 Pro Cycling Team (Q36)
No.	Rider	Pos.
111	Tom Pidcock (GBR)	3
112	David de la Cruz (ESP)	102
113	Xabier Azparren (ESP)	DNF-17
114	Fabio Christen (SUI)	133
115	Damien Howson (AUS)	28
116	Nickolas Zukowsky (CAN)	112
117	David González (ESP)	67
118	Marcel Camprubí (ESP)	114

(Kazakhstan) XDS Astana Team (XAT)
No.	Rider	Pos.
121	Harold Tejada (COL)	12
122	Nicola Conci (ITA)	71
123	Lorenzo Fortunato (ITA)	48
124	Sergio Higuita (COL)	DNS-14
125	Harold Martín López (ECU)	22
126	Fausto Masnada (ITA)	40
127	Wout Poels (NED)	36
128	Nicolas Vinokurov (KAZ)	105

(France) Groupama–FDJ (GFC)
No.	Rider	Pos.
131	Clément Braz Afonso (FRA)	35
132	Rémi Cavagna (FRA)	124
133	David Gaudu (FRA)	97
134	Thibaud Gruel (FRA)	103
135	Guillaume Martin (FRA)	DNF-2
136	Rudy Molard (FRA)	23
137	Brieuc Rolland (FRA)	45
138	Stefan Küng (SUI)	76

(Spain) Caja Rural–Seguros RGA (CJR)
No.	Rider	Pos.
141	Guillermo Thomas Silva (URU)	78
142	Abel Balderstone (ESP)	13
143	Fernando Barceló (ESP)	DNF-13
144	Joan Bou (ESP)	64
145	Jaume Guardeño (ESP)	14
146	Alex Molenaar (NED)	70
147	Joel Nicolau (ESP)	111
148	Jakub Otruba (CZE)	90

(Australia) Team Jayco–AlUla (JAY)
No.	Rider	Pos.
151	Ben O'Connor (AUS)	DNF-13
152	Koen Bouwman (NED)	DNF-6
153	Eddie Dunbar (IRL)	21
154	Anders Foldager (DEN)	147
155	Patrick Gamper (AUT)	100
156	Chris Harper (AUS)	DNF-11
157	Christopher Juul-Jensen (DEN)	110
158	Kelland O'Brien (AUS)	94

(France) Arkéa–B&B Hotels (ARK)
No.	Rider	Pos.
161	Raúl García Pierna (ESP)	DNF-10
162	Jenthe Biermans (BEL)	143
163	Victor Guernalec (FRA)	121
164	Léandre Lozouet (FRA)	120
165	Cristián Rodríguez (ESP)	DNS-7
166	Louis Rouland (FRA)	99
167	Alessandro Verre (ITA)	113
168	Pierre Thierry (FRA)	39

(France) Cofidis (COF)
No.	Rider	Pos.
171	Emanuel Buchmann (GER)	98
172	Sergio Samitier (ESP)	31
173	Stanisław Aniołkowski (POL)	152
174	Simon Carr (GBR)	DNS-6
175	Bryan Coquard (FRA)	136
176	Jesús Herrada (ESP)	77
177	Oliver Knight (GBR)	DNF-8
178	Paul Ourselin (FRA)	DNS-11

(Belgium) Intermarché–Wanty (IWA)
No.	Rider	Pos.
181	Huub Artz (NED)	116
182	Kamiel Bonneu (BEL)	115
183	Dries De Pooter (BEL)	128
184	Arne Marit (BEL)	146
185	Louis Meintjes (RSA)	16
186	Simone Petilli (ITA)	95
187	Dion Smith (NZL)	123
188	Luca Van Boven (BEL)	118

(Netherlands) Team Picnic–PostNL (TPP)
No.	Rider	Pos.
191	Patrick Eddy (AUS)	151
192	Chris Hamilton (AUS)	53
193	Bjoern Koerdt (GBR)	92
194	Gijs Leemreize (NED)	49
195	Juan Guillermo Martínez (COL)	54
196	Timo Roosen (NED)	137
197	Casper van Uden (NED)	DNS-10
198	Kevin Vermaerke (USA)	20

(Belgium) Lotto (LOT)
No.	Rider	Pos.
201	Lars Craps (BEL)	57
202	Jasper De Buyst (BEL)	140
203	Arjen Livyns (BEL)	DNS-6
204	Alec Segaert (BEL)	96
205	Eduardo Sepúlveda (ARG)	58
206	Liam Slock (BEL)	134
207	Elia Viviani (ITA)	150
208	Jonas Gregaard (DEN)	89

(Spain) Burgos Burpellet BH (BBH)
No.	Rider	Pos.
211	Mario Aparicio (ESP)	91
212	Sergio Chumil (GUA)	69
213	Eric Antonio Fagúndez (URU)	DNF-8
214	José Luis Faura (ESP)	47
215	Hugo de la Calle (ESP)	63
216	Carlos García Pierna (ESP)	DNF-4
217	Sinuhé Fernández (ESP)	DNF-12
218	Daniel Cavia (ESP)	DNF-7

Israel–Premier Tech (IPT)
No.	Rider	Pos.
221	George Bennett (NZL)	DNF-8
222	Pier-André Côté (CAN)	108
223	Marco Frigo (ITA)	32
224	Jan Hirt (CZE)	43
225	Nadav Raisberg (ISR)	141
226	Jake Stewart (GBR)	129
227	Ethan Vernon (GBR)	142
228	Matthew Riccitello (USA)	5

=== By nationality ===
Country	No. of riders	Finished	Stage wins
Argentina	1	1	
Australia	10	8	2 (Jay Vine x2)
Austria	4	4	
Belgium	19	17	3 (Jasper Philipsen x3)
Canada	2	2	
Colombia	7	5	1 (Egan Bernal)
Czechia	2	2	
Denmark	7	7	4 (Mads Pedersen, Jonas Vingegaard x3)
Ecuador	2	2	
Eritrea	1	1	
Estonia	1	1	
France	20	16	1 (David Gaudu)
Germany	5	5	
Great Britain	11	9	1 (Ben Turner)
Guatemala	1	1	
Ireland	2	1	
Israel	1	1	
Italy	17	15	2 (Filippo Ganna, Giulio Pellizzari)
Kazakhstan	1	1	
Luxembourg	1	1	
Monaco	1	1	
Netherlands	15	12	
New Zealand	3	2	
Norway	2	2	
Poland	2	2	
Portugal	2	2	1 (João Almeida)
Slovenia	2	1	
South Africa	1	1	
Spain	29	19	3 (Juan Ayuso x2, Marc Soler)
Switzerland	2	2	
United States	6	6	
Uruguay	2	1	
Venezuela	1	1	
	1	1	
Total	184	153	18
