= 2025 Vuelta a España, Stage 1 to Stage 11 =

Vuelta a España stages (cycling)

The 2025 Vuelta a España was a three-week cycling race which took place in Italy, France, Andorra and Spain. It was the 80th edition of the Vuelta a España and the third and final grand tour of the 2025 men's road cycling season. It started on 23 August in Turin, and finished on 14 September in Madrid.

== Classification standings ==
Legend
Denotes the leader of the general classification	Denotes the leader of the young rider classification
Denotes the leader of the points classification	Denotes the leader of the team classification
Denotes the leader of the mountains classification	Denotes the winner of the combativity award

== Stage 1 ==
23 August 2025 – Turin (Reggia di Venaria) (Italy) to Novara (Italy), 186.1 km (115.6 mi)

The race began with a 186.1-kilometre (115.6 mi) flat stage that was expected to offer an opportunity for the sprinters to take the first red leader’s jersey. There was a lone third-category climb that topped after 69.8 kilometres (43.4 mi) of racing.

As soon as the flag dropped, six riders got a gap on the peloton. The break was composed of Koen Bouwman (Team Jayco–AlUla), Alessandro Verre (Arkéa–B&B Hotels), Nicolas Vinokurov (XDS Astana Team), Pepijn Reinderink (Soudal–Quick-Step), Hugo de la Calle (Burgos Burpellet BH), and Joel Nicolau (Caja Rural–Seguros RGA). Their advantage over the peloton maxed out at just over two minutes as Alpecin–Deceuninck and Lidl–Trek took control for their sprinters, Jasper Philipsen and Mads Pedersen, respectively. At the top of the only categorized climb on the stage, Verre took maximum KOM points ahead of Nicolau and Vinokourov to take the first polka-dot jersey of the race. At the intermediate sprint with 90.6 kilometres (56.3 mi) left, the break swept up the points and the bonus seconds available. With 84 kilometres (52 mi) to go, de la Calle went solo off the front. The five remnants of the break were soon caught by the peloton. As the riders approached the finale of the stage, de la Calle was caught by the peloton at 37 kilometres (23 mi) from the finish. The race headed to the inevitable bunch sprint with the sprinters’ teams setting stations at the front of the peloton. In the final sprint, Philipsen launched inside the final 200 metres (660 ft), sprinting to the victory ahead of Ethan Vernon (Israel–Premier Tech) and Orluis Aular (Movistar Team) to take the first red jersey. Pedersen, the other stage favorite, was unable to contest the finish and only took fourteenth on the stage.

Stage 1 Result
Rank	Rider	Team	Time
1	Jasper Philipsen (BEL)	Alpecin–Deceuninck	4h 09' 12"
2	Ethan Vernon (GBR)	Israel–Premier Tech	+ 0"
3	Orluis Aular (VEN)	Movistar Team	+ 0"
4	Elia Viviani (ITA)	Lotto	+ 0"
5	Iván García Cortina (ESP)	Movistar Team	+ 0"
6	David González (ESP)	Q36.5 Pro Cycling Team	+ 0"
7	Bryan Coquard (FRA)	Cofidis	+ 0"
8	Guillermo Thomas Silva (URU)	Caja Rural–Seguros RGA	+ 0"
9	Tom Pidcock (GBR)	Q36.5 Pro Cycling Team	+ 0"
10	Madis Mihkels (EST)	EF Education–EasyPost	+ 0"

General classification after Stage 1
Rank	Rider	Team	Time
1	Jasper Philipsen (BEL)	Alpecin–Deceuninck	4h 09' 02"
2	Ethan Vernon (GBR)	Israel–Premier Tech	+ 4"
3	Pepijn Reinderink (NED)	Soudal–Quick-Step	+ 4"
4	Orluis Aular (VEN)	Movistar Team	+ 6"
5	Nicolas Vinokurov (KAZ)	XDS Astana Team	+ 6"
6	Koen Bouwman (NED)	Team Jayco–AlUla	+ 8"
7	Elia Viviani (ITA)	Lotto	+ 10"
8	Iván García Cortina (ESP)	Movistar Team	+ 10"
9	David González (ESP)	Q36.5 Pro Cycling Team	+ 10"
10	Bryan Coquard (FRA)	Cofidis	+ 10"

== Stage 2 ==
24 August 2025 – Alba (Italy) to Limone Piemonte (Italy), 159.6 km (99.2 mi)

The second stage offered the first opportunity for the climbers to make a difference with the riders finishing atop a second-category climb to Limone Piemonte (9.8 km at 5.1%), which was the only categorized climb on the route. The intermediate sprint took place after 68.4 kilometres (42.5 mi) of racing and offered six, four, and two bonus seconds to the first three riders across.

A four-man break composed of Jakub Otruba (Caja Rural–Seguros RGA), Gal Glivar (Alpecin–Deceuninck), Liam Slock (Lotto), and Nico Denz (Red Bull–Bora–Hansgrohe) was able to get away after a few kilometres. After Denz decided to drop back to the peloton, Sinuhé Fernández (Burgos Burpellet BH) joined the trio up front to establish the break of the day. The break’s maximum advantage was only around two minutes as the peloton kept them on a tight leash. At the intermediate sprint, Slock took the maximum points while Vernon racked up the last remaining ten points from the peloton. With 46 kilometres (29 mi) left, Otruba attacked from the break, followed immediately by Glivar while Slock gradually got back to their wheel. Fernández was dropped and was eventually caught by the peloton.

With 26.5 kilometres (16.5 mi) to go, a crash took down several riders in the peloton, including Jonas Vingegaard (Visma–Lease a Bike). All riders who went down were able to get back up but Vingegaard’s teammate, Axel Zingle, needed several minutes before getting back on the bike. The break managed to reach the bottom of the final climb in front but they were eventually swept up with around 6 kilometres (3.7 mi) left. There were no attacks from the peloton on the climb as the riders headed to a reduced bunch sprint. Inside the final kilometre, Marc Soler (UAE Team Emirates XRG) attacked but he was immediately brought back. In the sprint, Vingegaard beat Giulio Ciccone (Lidl–Trek) in a photo finish to win the stage, taking the red jersey in the process. David Gaudu (Groupama–FDJ) and Egan Bernal (Ineos Grenadiers) finished third and fourth, respectively, while there was a two second gap towards the rest of the peloton.

Stage 2 Result
Rank	Rider	Team	Time
1	Jonas Vingegaard (DEN)	Visma–Lease a Bike	3h 47' 14"
2	Giulio Ciccone (ITA)	Lidl–Trek	+ 0"
3	David Gaudu (FRA)	Groupama–FDJ	+ 0"
4	Egan Bernal (COL)	Ineos Grenadiers	+ 0"
5	João Almeida (POR)	UAE Team Emirates XRG	+ 2"
6	Felix Gall (AUT)	Decathlon–AG2R La Mondiale	+ 2"
7	Jai Hindley (AUS)	Red Bull–Bora–Hansgrohe	+ 2"
8	Juan Ayuso (ESP)	UAE Team Emirates XRG	+ 2"
9	Matteo Jorgenson (USA)	Visma–Lease a Bike	+ 2"
10	Tom Pidcock (GBR)	Q36.5 Pro Cycling Team	+ 2"

General classification after Stage 2
Rank	Rider	Team	Time
1	Jonas Vingegaard (DEN)	Visma–Lease a Bike	7h 56' 16"
2	Giulio Ciccone (ITA)	Lidl–Trek	+ 4"
3	David Gaudu (FRA)	Groupama–FDJ	+ 6"
4	Egan Bernal (COL)	Ineos Grenadiers	+ 10"
5	Tom Pidcock (GBR)	Q36.5 Pro Cycling Team	+ 12"
6	Jai Hindley (AUS)	Red Bull–Bora–Hansgrohe	+ 12"
7	Santiago Buitrago (COL)	Team Bahrain Victorious	+ 12"
8	Matteo Jorgenson (USA)	Visma–Lease a Bike	+ 12"
9	Juan Ayuso (ESP)	UAE Team Emirates XRG	+ 12"
10	Marc Soler (ESP)	UAE Team Emirates XRG	+ 12"

== Stage 3 ==
25 August 2025 – San Maurizio Canavese (Italy) to Ceres (Italy), 134.6 km (83.6 mi)

Stage three was contested on a lumpy parcours that was expected to suit the versatile sprinters. There was a second-category climb that topped with 68.8 kilometres (42.8 mi) to go. Afterwards, there were two uncategorized climbs before the riders gradually climbed towards the fourth-category climb to the finish in Ceres. The last 2.2 kilometres (1.4 mi) averaged 4.2%.

It took a couple of kilometres before a group containing Sean Quinn (EF Education–EasyPost), Patrick Gamper (Team Jayco–AlUla), Luca Van Boven (Intermarché–Wanty), and Verre managed to escape from the peloton. The peloton only gave them around two and a half minutes with Lidl–Trek controlling for Pedersen, who was the favorite for the stage. As the break tackled the second-category climb in the middle of the stage, Verre dropped everyone but Quinn before taking the maximum points to take back the lead in the mountains classification. The duo kept going before Quinn left Verre behind with 39 kilometres (24 mi) to go. He was caught by the peloton at just under 20 kilometres (12 mi) from the finish. Inside the final kilometre, Ciccone led out Pedersen before the Dane led into the final corner. However, Gaudu divebombed the corner to take the lead out of the exit, outsprinting Pedersen to win the stage. Vingegaard took third to take four bonus seconds, which allowed him to keep the red jersey over Gaudu, who is now on the same time as the race leader.

Stage 3 Result
Rank	Rider	Team	Time
1	David Gaudu (FRA)	Groupama–FDJ	2h 59' 24"
2	Mads Pedersen (DEN)	Lidl–Trek	+ 0"
3	Jonas Vingegaard (DEN)	Visma–Lease a Bike	+ 0"
4	Giulio Ciccone (ITA)	Lidl–Trek	+ 0"
5	Jordan Labrosse (FRA)	Decathlon–AG2R La Mondiale	+ 0"
6	Orluis Aular (VEN)	Movistar Team	+ 0"
7	Santiago Buitrago (COL)	Team Bahrain Victorious	+ 0"
8	Egan Bernal (COL)	Ineos Grenadiers	+ 0"
9	Bjoern Koerdt (GBR)	Team Picnic–PostNL	+ 0"
10	Jai Hindley (AUS)	Red Bull–Bora–Hansgrohe	+ 0"

General classification after Stage 3
Rank	Rider	Team	Time
1	Jonas Vingegaard (DEN)	Visma–Lease a Bike	10h 55' 36"
2	David Gaudu (FRA)	Groupama–FDJ	+ 0"
3	Giulio Ciccone (ITA)	Lidl–Trek	+ 8"
4	Egan Bernal (COL)	Ineos Grenadiers	+ 14"
5	Tom Pidcock (GBR)	Q36.5 Pro Cycling Team	+ 16"
6	Jai Hindley (AUS)	Red Bull–Bora–Hansgrohe	+ 16"
7	Santiago Buitrago (COL)	Team Bahrain Victorious	+ 16"
8	Matteo Jorgenson (USA)	Visma–Lease a Bike	+ 16"
9	Juan Ayuso (ESP)	UAE Team Emirates XRG	+ 16"
10	Valentin Paret-Peintre (FRA)	Soudal–Quick-Step	+ 16"

== Stage 4 ==
26 August 2025 – Susa (Italy) to Voiron (France), 206.7 km (128.4 mi)

The race left Italy on the fourth stage as the riders made their way into France. The first 76.8 kilometres (47.7 mi) featured three categorized climbs - the third-category Puerto Exiles (5.6 km at 5.6%), the second-category Col de Montgenévre (8.3 km at 6.1%), and the second-category Col du Lautaret (13.8 km at 4.3%). After summiting the Lautaret, a long descent followed and the rest of the stage was mostly flat apart from an uncategorized climb with just under 50 kilometres (31 mi) to go.

After a 10-kilometre (6.2 mi) fight to get into the break, five riders were able to get a gap on the peloton. The group included Louis Vervaeke (Soudal–Quick-Step), Kamiel Bonneu (Intermarché–Wanty), Mario Aparicio (Burgos Burpellet BH), Quinn, and Nicolau. They were able to get an advantage of as much as four minutes before the peloton began to reel them in. Over the categorized climbs in the first half of the stage, Nicolau gathered enough KOM points to take over the lead of the mountains classification from Verre. With 91 kilometres (57 mi) still to go, the break was already brought back by the peloton, prompting Aparicio to try and form another break. After he was caught, Fernández went on a solo move of his own. His lead never went above a minute and he was reeled in with 47 kilometres (29 mi) left.

At the intermediate sprint with 32 kilometres (20 mi) to go, Pedersen took maximum points ahead of the Israel–Premier Tech duo of Vernon and Jake Stewart. Shortly afterwards, there was an attack from Bruno Armirail (Decathlon–AG2R La Mondiale). His lead maxed out at around 40 seconds before being swallowed up at 15 kilometres (9.3 mi) from the finish. A few kilometres later, there was a crash that took down several riders but no one was seriously hurt. The riders headed to the expected bunch sprint, where Ben Turner (Ineos Grenadiers) edged out Philipsen to take his first Grand Tour victory. By finishing 25th on the stage compared to Vingegaard’s 42nd place, Gaudu took the red jersey by having the least sum of stage finish positions from the first four stages.

Stage 4 Result
Rank	Rider	Team	Time
1	Ben Turner (GBR)	Ineos Grenadiers	4h 50' 14"
2	Jasper Philipsen (BEL)	Alpecin–Deceuninck	+ 0"
3	Edward Planckaert (BEL)	Alpecin–Deceuninck	+ 0"
4	Ethan Vernon (GBR)	Israel–Premier Tech	+ 0"
5	Jenthe Biermans (BEL)	Arkéa–B&B Hotels	+ 0"
6	Mads Pedersen (DEN)	Lidl–Trek	+ 0"
7	Fabio Christen (SUI)	Q36.5 Pro Cycling Team	+ 0"
8	Orluis Aular (VEN)	Movistar Team	+ 0"
9	Guillermo Thomas Silva (URU)	Caja Rural–Seguros RGA	+ 0"
10	Nicolò Buratti (ITA)	Team Bahrain Victorious	+ 0"

General classification after Stage 4
Rank	Rider	Team	Time
1	David Gaudu (FRA)	Groupama–FDJ	15h 45' 50"
2	Jonas Vingegaard (DEN)	Visma–Lease a Bike	+ 0"
3	Giulio Ciccone (ITA)	Lidl–Trek	+ 8"
4	Egan Bernal (COL)	Ineos Grenadiers	+ 14"
5	Tom Pidcock (GBR)	Q36.5 Pro Cycling Team	+ 16"
6	Jai Hindley (AUS)	Red Bull–Bora–Hansgrohe	+ 16"
7	Santiago Buitrago (COL)	Team Bahrain Victorious	+ 16"
8	Matteo Jorgenson (USA)	Visma–Lease a Bike	+ 16"
9	Sepp Kuss (USA)	Visma–Lease a Bike	+ 16"
10	Juan Ayuso (ESP)	UAE Team Emirates XRG	+ 16"

== Stage 5 ==
27 August 2025 – Figueres to Figueres, 20 km (12 mi) (TTT)

The race reached Spain on the fifth stage as the riders tackled a 24.1-kilometre (15.0 mi) flat team time trial in Figueres. The teams set off at four-minute intervals in the reverse order of their team classification standing with the exception of Groupama–FDJ, which was the last team off the start ramp by virtue of having the general classification leader, Gaudu. Each team’s time was set by their fourth rider across the line.

The first team off the start ramp, Lotto, set the initial benchmark time of 25’ 53”. Their team was not beaten until the seventh team off the start ramp, Lidl–Trek, was able to do so. They set a time of 25’ 35”, becoming the first team to average more than 56 kilometres per hour. Their time was threatened by Ineos Grenadiers, which set a time that was 10 seconds faster by the first time check. However, they slowed towards the end, eventually finishing with a time of 25’ 42”, seven seconds slower than Lidl–Trek. Red Bull–Bora–Hansgrohe was in contention for the stage win and despite being more than ten seconds slower by the second time check, they managed to threaten Lidl–Trek’s time before falling short by just three seconds. Three more teams, UAE Team Emirates XRG, Visma–Lease a Bike, and Groupama–FDJ, were able to beat Lidl–Trek’s time at the first time check before falling behind by the second time check. Eventually, the best performance was ridden by UAE Team Emirates XRG. They took 14 seconds from Lidl–Trek in the final part of the course to set a time of 25’ 26”, averaging almost 57 kilometres per hour. Visma–Lease a Bike eventually finished second on the day, going eight seconds slower than the winners. With Gaudu losing 16 seconds to Vingegaard on the day, the Dane regained the red jersey by eight seconds ahead of the UAE Team Emirates XRG trio of Juan Ayuso, João Almeida, and Soler.

Protestors with Palestinian flags and a banner reading "Neutrality is complicity. Boycott Israel" blocked Israel-Premier Tech's team time trial. The team finished the stage in 19th place of 23, 54 seconds to the stage winners, but were then awarded 15 seconds due to the protest, thus placing them in 14th place. One protestor was arrested by the regional Catalan Police. Vuelta's director, Javier Guillén, responded by stating "they cannot allow what happened" in Stage 5 with the Israel-Premier Tech team. Some sports commentators have commended protestors, but disapproved that the protest affected only one team and for putting rider safety at risk during the protest. Other commentators disapproved the protest all together affirming that the Vuelta is not the place for such protests.

Stage 5 Result
Rank	Team	Time
1	(United Arab Emirates) UAE Team Emirates XRG	25' 26"
2	(Netherlands) Visma–Lease a Bike	+ 8"
3	(United States) Lidl–Trek	+ 9"
4	(Germany) Red Bull–Bora–Hansgrohe	+ 12"
5	(United Kingdom) Ineos Grenadiers	+ 16"
6	(Spain) Movistar Team	+ 17"
7	(France) Decathlon–AG2R La Mondiale	+ 17"
8	(Switzerland) Q36.5 Pro Cycling Team	+ 22"
9	(France) Groupama–FDJ	+ 24"
10	(Belgium) Lotto	+ 27"

General classification after stage 5
Rank	Rider	Team	Time
1	Jonas Vingegaard (DEN)	Visma–Lease a Bike	16h 11' 24"
2	Juan Ayuso (ESP)	UAE Team Emirates XRG	+ 8"
3	João Almeida (POR)	UAE Team Emirates XRG	+ 8"
4	Marc Soler (ESP)	UAE Team Emirates XRG	+ 8"
5	Giulio Ciccone (ITA)	Lidl–Trek	+ 9"
6	David Gaudu (FRA)	Groupama–FDJ	+ 16"
7	Matteo Jorgenson (USA)	Visma–Lease a Bike	+ 16"
8	Jai Hindley (AUS)	Red Bull–Bora–Hansgrohe	+ 20"
9	Giulio Pellizzari (ITA)	Red Bull–Bora–Hansgrohe	+ 20"
10	Egan Bernal (COL)	Ineos Grenadiers	+ 22"

== Stage 6 ==
28 August 2025 – Olot to Pal (Andorra), 170.3 km (105.8 mi)

The riders tackled the first proper mountain stage on the sixth stage, which featured a summit finish at Pal in Andorra (9.6 km at 6.3%). Before arriving at Pal, there were three categorized climbs - the third-category Collada de Sentigosa (11.4 km at 4.1%), the first-category Collada de Toses (24.3 km at 3.5%), and the first-category Alto de la Comella (4.2 km at 8%). At the top of the latter climb, there were six, four, and two bonus seconds available to the first three riders across the top.

A few kilometres after the flag dropped, a group of 10 riders were able to escape from the peloton. The best-placed GC rider in the break was Torstein Træen (Team Bahrain Victorious), who was only 58 seconds down on Vingegaard at the start of the stage. Lorenzo Fortunato (XDS Astana Team), Louis Vervaeke (Soudal–Quick-Step), and Armirail were other riders in the break who were also in contention to take the red jersey from Vingegaard. Visma–Lease a Bike immediately set a steady pace in the peloton, allowing the break to increase their advantage and were content to let the break fight for the stage win. At the top of the first climb, the Collada de Sentigosa, Jay Vine (UAE Team Emirates XRG) took maximum points over Vervaeke. Over the top of Collada de Toses, Vervaeke was able to beat Vine, initially taking the lead in the mountains classification. As the break approached the final 30 kilometres (19 mi), their lead reached its highest at almost seven minutes, which meant that Træen was firmly in the virtual lead of the general classification.

On the penultimate climb, the Alto de la Comella, Vine attacked over the top, building his lead over the chasers on the descent. At the foot of the final climb to Pal, he held a lead of a minute over the rest of the break. The group of chasers splintered on the final climb, with Træen emerging as the strongest chaser after dropping the rest of his group. He was only able to close to within 40 seconds of the leader but Vine held him off to win his third Vuelta stage, after having won two stages in 2022. With his win, he took over the lead of the mountains classification. Træen took second on the stage, 54 seconds down on Vine. In the peloton, Almeida suffered a mechanical on the Alto de la Comella but he quickly came back to the peloton. On the final climb, Lidl–Trek lifted the pace, which showed the first signs of weakness from Ayuso, who was dropped midway up the climb. Close to the top, Ciccone attacked with Vingegaard straight on his wheel. Almeida slowly brought the other contenders back to their wheel, neutralizing any gaps from the GC group. A group containing Mikel Landa (Soudal–Quick-Step), Ben O'Connor (Team Jayco–AlUla), Gaudu, and Soler lost 28 seconds to the main GC group. With Træen gaining three and a half minutes on Vingegaard, he took the red jersey with a lead of half a minute on Armirail. Fortunato and Vervaeke moved up to third and fourth, respectively.

Stage 6 Result
Rank	Rider	Team	Time
1	Jay Vine (AUS)	UAE Team Emirates XRG	4h 12' 36"
2	Torstein Træen (NOR)	Team Bahrain Victorious	+ 54"
3	Lorenzo Fortunato (ITA)	XDS Astana Team	+ 1' 10"
4	Bruno Armirail (FRA)	Decathlon–AG2R La Mondiale	+ 1' 15"
5	Pablo Castrillo (ESP)	Movistar Team	+ 1' 52"
6	James Shaw (GBR)	EF Education–EasyPost	+ 2' 05"
7	Louis Vervaeke (BEL)	Soudal–Quick-Step	+ 2' 15"
8	Ramses Debruyne (BEL)	Alpecin–Deceuninck	+ 2' 19"
9	Archie Ryan (IRL)	EF Education–EasyPost	+ 2' 42"
10	João Almeida (POR)	UAE Team Emirates XRG	+ 4' 19"

General classification after Stage 6
Rank	Rider	Team	Time
1	Torstein Træen (NOR)	Team Bahrain Victorious	20h 25' 46"
2	Bruno Armirail (FRA)	Decathlon–AG2R La Mondiale	+ 31"
3	Lorenzo Fortunato (ITA)	XDS Astana Team	+ 1' 01"
4	Louis Vervaeke (BEL)	Soudal–Quick-Step	+ 1' 58"
5	Jonas Vingegaard (DEN)	Visma–Lease a Bike	+ 2' 33"
6	João Almeida (POR)	UAE Team Emirates XRG	+ 2' 41"
7	Giulio Ciccone (ITA)	Lidl–Trek	+ 2' 42"
8	Matteo Jorgenson (USA)	Visma–Lease a Bike	+ 2' 49"
9	Jai Hindley (AUS)	Red Bull–Bora–Hansgrohe	+ 2' 53"
10	Giulio Pellizzari (ITA)	Red Bull–Bora–Hansgrohe	+ 2' 53"

== Stage 7 ==
29 August 2025 – Andorra la Vella (Andorra) to Cerler (Huesca La Magia), 188 km (117 mi)

The seventh stage featured a second successive moutainous stage as the riders tackled the climbs of Port del Cantó (24.7 km at 4.4%), Puerto de la Creu de Perves (5.7 km at 6.3%), and Coll de L'Espina (7.1 km at 5.5%) before finishing atop Cerler (12.1 km at 5.8%). Despite its average gradient, the first two-thirds of the climb to Cerler featured several kilometres over 8% while also having two short flat sections, bringing down the climb's average gradient.

The start of the stage was marked by an attack from Ayuso, who lost seven minutes the previous day. He spent the entirety of the first climb, the Port del Cantó, alone in front, taking maximum points at the top before being joined by 12 other riders on the descent. The break included Vine, the previous day's stage winner, and Pedersen, the leader of the points classification. The biggest threat in the break to Træen's red jersey was Raúl García Pierna (Arkéa–B&B Hotels), who was just under five minutes down at the start of the day. As a result, Team Bahrain Victorious pegged the break's advantage at around four minutes for most of the stage. At the top of the next two climbs, the Puerto de la Creu de Perves and the Coll de L'Espina, Vine took maximum points to extend his lead in the mountains classification. Near the foot of the final climb, Pedersen crossed the intermediate sprint in first place, extending his lead in the points classification. The break's advantage was three and a half minutes heading to the final climb to Cerler.

With just under 11 kilometres (6.8 mi) to go, Ayuso attacked from the break with Marco Frigo (Israel–Premier Tech) being the only one able to follow. A few minutes later, Ayuso made his second attack, dropping Frigo for good. Frigo was joined by García Pierna but Ayuso gradually extended his lead to the top to win his first Vuelta stage. The victory marked UAE Team Emirates XRG's third consecutive stage win. In the peloton, Visma–Lease a Bike initially set a steady pace on the final climb before Soler took over. Almeida accelerated once, dropping everyone but Vingegaard and Ciccone. Eventually, most of the GC contenders were able to come back before the finish. The only rider to gain time was Soler, who made a late attack to gain five seconds on the line. Antonio Tiberi (Team Bahrain Victorious) and Gaudu lost more than 12 minutes to the main GC group to drop out of contention. Træen finished with the main GC group to retain the red jersey.

Stage 7 Result
Rank	Rider	Team	Time
1	Juan Ayuso (ESP)	UAE Team Emirates XRG	4h 49' 41"
2	Marco Frigo (ITA)	Israel–Premier Tech	+ 1' 15"
3	Raúl García Pierna (ESP)	Arkéa–B&B Hotels	+ 1' 21"
4	Harold Tejada (COL)	XDS Astana Team	+ 1' 28"
5	Sean Quinn (USA)	EF Education–EasyPost	+ 1' 28"
6	Kevin Vermaerke (USA)	Team Picnic–PostNL	+ 1' 28"
7	Eduardo Sepúlveda (ARG)	Lotto	+ 1' 28"
8	Brieuc Rolland (FRA)	Groupama–FDJ	+ 2' 17"
9	Marc Soler (ESP)	UAE Team Emirates XRG	+ 2' 30"
10	Tom Pidcock (GBR)	Q36.5 Pro Cycling Team	+ 2' 35"

General classification after Stage 7
Rank	Rider	Team	Time
1	Torstein Træen (NOR)	Team Bahrain Victorious	25h 18' 02"
2	Jonas Vingegaard (DEN)	Visma–Lease a Bike	+ 2' 33"
3	João Almeida (POR)	UAE Team Emirates XRG	+ 2' 41"
4	Giulio Ciccone (ITA)	Lidl–Trek	+ 2' 42"
5	Lorenzo Fortunato (ITA)	XDS Astana Team	+ 2' 47"
6	Matteo Jorgenson (USA)	Visma–Lease a Bike	+ 2' 49"
7	Jai Hindley (AUS)	Red Bull–Bora–Hansgrohe	+ 2' 53"
8	Giulio Pellizzari (ITA)	Red Bull–Bora–Hansgrohe	+ 2' 53"
9	Egan Bernal (COL)	Ineos Grenadiers	+ 2' 55"
10	Felix Gall (AUT)	Decathlon–AG2R La Mondiale	+ 2' 58"

== Stage 8 ==
30 August 2025 – Monzón (Templario) to Zaragoza, 163.5 km (101.6 mi)

The eighth stage featured a chance for the sprinters as the riders tackled a 163.5-kilometre (101.6 mi) flat stage from Monzón Templario to Zaragoza. There were no categorized climbs on the route and the intermediate sprint was located with 42.5 kilometres (26.4 mi) left.

Immediately from the start of the stage, Sergio Samitier (Cofidis), Joan Bou (Caja Rural–Seguros RGA), and José Luis Faura (Burgos Burpellet BH) were able to get away from the peloton. Their advantage never went above four minutes as the sprinters' team began to take control of the peloton. At the intermediate sprint, after the break took the first three spots, Pedersen took 13 points ahead of Vernon's 10 to add to his lead in the points classification. Just before the first passage of the finish line with 23 kilometres (14 mi) to go, Faura was dropped from the break while the peloton was now within 30 seconds of catching the front duo. Samitier and Bou were eventually caught with 17 kilometres (11 mi) left, setting up the expected bunch sprint. In the final kilometre, Lotto delivered Elia Viviani near the front before the Italian launched his sprint inside the final 200 metres (660 ft). However, Philipsen was able to come around him to win the stage, his second in this Vuelta. After the stage, Viviani and Bryan Coquard (Cofidis) were deemed to have deviated too much during their sprints, relegating them from second and fifth, respectively, to the bottom of the group. The top of the GC remained unchanged.

Stage 8 Result
Rank	Rider	Team	Time
1	Jasper Philipsen (BEL)	Alpecin–Deceuninck	3h 43' 48"
2	Ethan Vernon (GBR)	Israel–Premier Tech	+ 0"
3	Arne Marit (BEL)	Intermarché–Wanty	+ 0"
4	Anders Foldager (DEN)	Team Jayco–AlUla	+ 0"
5	Madis Mihkels (EST)	EF Education–EasyPost	+ 0"
6	Thibaud Gruel (FRA)	Groupama–FDJ	+ 0"
7	Fabio Christen (SUI)	Q36.5 Pro Cycling Team	+ 0"
8	Ben Turner (GBR)	Ineos Grenadiers	+ 0"
9	Mads Pedersen (DEN)	Lidl–Trek	+ 0"
10	David González (ESP)	Q36.5 Pro Cycling Team	+ 0"

General classification after Stage 8
Rank	Rider	Team	Time
1	Torstein Træen (NOR)	Team Bahrain Victorious	29h 01' 50"
2	Jonas Vingegaard (DEN)	Visma–Lease a Bike	+ 2' 33"
3	João Almeida (POR)	UAE Team Emirates XRG	+ 2' 41"
4	Giulio Ciccone (ITA)	Lidl–Trek	+ 2' 42"
5	Lorenzo Fortunato (ITA)	XDS Astana Team	+ 2' 47"
6	Matteo Jorgenson (USA)	Visma–Lease a Bike	+ 2' 49"
7	Jai Hindley (AUS)	Red Bull–Bora–Hansgrohe	+ 2' 53"
8	Giulio Pellizzari (ITA)	Red Bull–Bora–Hansgrohe	+ 2' 53"
9	Egan Bernal (COL)	Ineos Grenadiers	+ 2' 55"
10	Felix Gall (AUT)	Decathlon–AG2R La Mondiale	+ 2' 58"

== Stage 9 ==
31 August 2025 – Alfaro to Valdezcaray, 195.5 km (121.5 mi)

The first week of the Vuelta ended with another uphill finish as the riders finished atop the first-category Estación de Esquí de Valdezcaray (13.2 km at 5%). The first 182.5 kilometres (113.4 mi) of the stage had no categorized climbs but it featured multiple lumps. The steepest part of the final climb was at the bottom, having a maximum gradient of 12%, before easing off in the final 6 kilometres (3.7 mi) where the climb averaged between 3-4%.

There was huge fight to get into the break at the start, taking more than 40 kilometres (25 mi) before a group of five went away. The group was composed of Michał Kwiatkowski (Ineos Grenadiers), Archie Ryan (EF Education–EasyPost), Michel Hessmann (Movistar Team), Slock, and Vermaerke. Their advantage maxed out at just over two and a half minutes as Lidl–Trek and Q36.5 Pro Cycling Team controlled the stage for Ciccone and Tom Pidcock, respectively. The five-man group was gradually reeled in as the riders approached the final climb to Valdezcaray. They were eventually swallowed up at the base of the climb.

With just over 11 kilometres (6.8 mi) left, Matteo Jorgenson (Visma–Lease a Bike) began to set a furious pace, splitting the peloton to pieces before Vingegaard launched his attack. The only rider to stay with him was Ciccone, who was able to follow for a kilometre before blowing up. Ciccone was soon passed by a chase group composed of Almeida, Pidcock, and Felix Gall (Decathlon–AG2R La Mondiale). Almeida and Pidcock dropped Gall with 7.5 kilometres (4.7 mi) left, going in pursuit of Vingegaard, but the Dane kept an advantage of half a minute towards the top to win his second stage of this year's Vuelta. Pidcock outsprinted Almeida at the finish to take second, 24 seconds behind Vingegaard, while Gall crossed the line at a minute down. The remnants of the GC group, which included Træen, finished at 1' 46" behind, which meant that Træen kept the red jersey but by a reduced advantage of 37 seconds over Vingegaard.

Stage 9 Result
Rank	Rider	Team	Time
1	Jonas Vingegaard (DEN)	Visma–Lease a Bike	4h 32' 10"
2	Tom Pidcock (GBR)	Q36.5 Pro Cycling Team	+ 24"
3	João Almeida (POR)	UAE Team Emirates XRG	+ 24"
4	Felix Gall (AUT)	Decathlon–AG2R La Mondiale	+ 1' 02"
5	Raúl García Pierna (ESP)	Arkéa–B&B Hotels	+ 1' 46"
6	Marc Soler (ESP)	UAE Team Emirates XRG	+ 1' 46"
7	Giulio Ciccone (ITA)	Lidl–Trek	+ 1' 46"
8	Markel Beloki (ESP)	EF Education–EasyPost	+ 1' 46"
9	Jai Hindley (AUS)	Red Bull–Bora–Hansgrohe	+ 1' 46"
10	Lorenzo Fortunato (ITA)	XDS Astana Team	+ 1' 46"

General classification after Stage 9
Rank	Rider	Team	Time
1	Torstein Træen (NOR)	Team Bahrain Victorious	33h 35' 46"
2	Jonas Vingegaard (DEN)	Visma–Lease a Bike	+ 37"
3	João Almeida (POR)	UAE Team Emirates XRG	+ 1' 15"
4	Tom Pidcock (GBR)	Q36.5 Pro Cycling Team	+ 1' 35"
5	Felix Gall (AUT)	Decathlon–AG2R La Mondiale	+ 2' 14"
6	Giulio Ciccone (ITA)	Lidl–Trek	+ 2' 42"
7	Lorenzo Fortunato (ITA)	XDS Astana Team	+ 2' 47"
8	Matteo Jorgenson (USA)	Visma–Lease a Bike	+ 2' 49"
9	Jai Hindley (AUS)	Red Bull–Bora–Hansgrohe	+ 2' 53"
10	Giulio Pellizzari (ITA)	Red Bull–Bora–Hansgrohe	+ 2' 53"

== Rest day 1 ==
1 September 2025 – Pamplona

== Stage 10 ==
2 September 2025 – Arguedas (Parque de la Naturaleza Sendaviva) to El Ferial Larra Belagua, 175.3 km (108.9 mi)

Following the first rest day, the Vuelta resumed with a hilly stage which finished atop the Puerto de Belagua (9.4 km at 6.3%). The terrain before the final climb was undulating and featured the third-category Alto de las Coronas (8.3 km at 4.4%) with just over 55 kilometres (34 mi) left on the stage. The first 7 kilometres (4.3 mi) of Puerto de Belagua averaged over 7% before easing off in the final 2 kilometres (1.2 mi).

Much like in stage nine, there was another big fight for the break with the fight on the stage taking place over the first 100 kilometres (62 mi). There was a mass crash with around 120 kilometres (75 mi) left, causing Raúl García Pierna to abandon the race. At one point, Vingegaard was on the attack but his group was quickly closed down. Eventually, a group of 22 riders went away with 74 kilometres (46 mi) to go. Six riders were able to bridge to the front to make it 28 riders in the break. The closest rider on GC in the break was Junior Lecerf (Soudal–Quick-Step), who was just under four and a half minutes down on Træen. The break’s advantage maxed out at around three and a half minutes with Team Bahrain Victorious in control of the peloton. Just after the categorized climb of Alto de las Coronas, the break split as a group of 10 riders went off the front. After the break passed through the intermediate sprint with 22 kilometres (14 mi) to go, Alec Segaert (Lotto) attacked off the front, building a lead of 45 seconds over the chasers before the foot of the final climb to Puerto de Belagua.

At the bottom of the final climb, attacks began in the chase group, gradually closing in on Segaert before Castrillo eventually went past him. Behind Castrillo, Vine began to drop the rest of the chasers to go off in pursuit of the Spaniard. Vine caught up to Castrillo with 5.6 kilometres (3.5 mi) left before dropping him shortly thereafter. Vine soloed to the finish to win his second stage of this year’s race while also extending his lead in the mountains classification. In the peloton, UAE Team Emirates XRG set a hard pace on the final climb, dropping Træen in the process. Almeida attacked twice, putting riders such as Ciccone, Gall, and Bernal in difficulty, but he was not able to gap Vingegaard. By the finish, Ciccone was able to come back to the main GC group. Gall and Bernal lost 26 and 37 seconds, respectively, while Træen lost more than a minute. With Træen being distanced, Vingegaard regained the red jersey by 26 seconds on Træen and 38 seconds on Almeida. Pidcock was the only other rider within a minute of Vingegaard while the rest of the top ten were now more than two minutes down.

Stage 10 Result
Rank	Rider	Team	Time
1	Jay Vine (AUS)	UAE Team Emirates XRG	3h 56' 24"
2	Pablo Castrillo (ESP)	Movistar Team	+ 35"
3	Javier Romo (ESP)	Movistar Team	+ 1' 04"
4	Archie Ryan (IRL)	EF Education–EasyPost	+ 1' 05"
5	Tom Pidcock (GBR)	Q36.5 Pro Cycling Team	+ 1' 05"
6	Giulio Ciccone (ITA)	Lidl–Trek	+ 1' 05"
7	Jai Hindley (AUS)	Red Bull–Bora–Hansgrohe	+ 1' 05"
8	Matteo Jorgenson (USA)	Visma–Lease a Bike	+ 1' 05"
9	Junior Lecerf (BEL)	Soudal–Quick-Step	+ 1' 05"
10	João Almeida (POR)	UAE Team Emirates XRG	+ 1' 05"

General classification after Stage 10
Rank	Rider	Team	Time
1	Jonas Vingegaard (DEN)	Visma–Lease a Bike	37h 33' 52"
2	Torstein Træen (NOR)	Team Bahrain Victorious	+ 26"
3	João Almeida (POR)	UAE Team Emirates XRG	+ 38"
4	Tom Pidcock (GBR)	Q36.5 Pro Cycling Team	+ 58"
5	Felix Gall (AUT)	Decathlon–AG2R La Mondiale	+ 2' 03"
6	Giulio Ciccone (ITA)	Lidl–Trek	+ 2' 05"
7	Matteo Jorgenson (USA)	Visma–Lease a Bike	+ 2' 12"
8	Jai Hindley (AUS)	Red Bull–Bora–Hansgrohe	+ 2' 16"
9	Giulio Pellizzari (ITA)	Red Bull–Bora–Hansgrohe	+ 2' 16"
10	Matthew Riccitello (USA)	Israel–Premier Tech	+ 2' 43"

== Stage 11 ==
3 September 2025 – Bilbao to Bilbao, 157.4 km (97.8 mi)

The twelfth stage featured a hilly 167-kilometre (104 mi) stage that was expected to suit the puncheurs. There were seven categorized climbs that were scattered throughout the stage. In the last 57 kilometres (35 mi), the riders tackled the second-category Alto del Vivero (4.2 km at 8.3%) twice before heading towards the third-category Alto de Pike (2.3 km at 8.9%), the final climb on the day. The last 1.2 kilometres (0.75 mi) of the Alto de Pike averaged over 12% with bonus seconds available at the top. From the top, there were 7.8 kilometres (4.8 mi) left to the finish in Bilbao.

The start of the stage was delayed due to a meeting between team representatives, CPA, and the race organizers with regards to safety issues from potential pro-Palestinian protests on the stage. With the uphill start to the stage, multiple riders attempted to get into the break. After just over 34 kilometres (21 mi) of racing, a group of three riders, Soler, Pedersen, and Aular, was able to get a significant gap on the peloton. Several riders tried to bridge to the trio but the front group was the only one allowed to get a gap. With 80 kilometres (50 mi) left, Soler soloed off the front while Pedersen and Aular were caught by the peloton. Soler himself was caught at the base of the first ascent of Alto del Vivero. On the climb, Mikel Landa (Soudal–Quick-Step) tried to form another break. He was soon joined by Santiago Buitrago (Team Bahrain Victorious) while a group of six chasers, including Pedersen, went off in pursuit of them. The chasers were never able to get close to the front duo and were eventually swallowed up by the peloton. With 33 kilometres (21 mi) to go, Landa suffered from cramps, leaving Buitrago up front. Buitrago held a lead of close to 40 seconds heading to the second climb up Alto del Vivero.

On the climb, Almeida accelerated twice with his final attack bringing back Buitrago in the process. A group containing most of the GC contenders formed on the descent of the climb. On the approach to Alto de Pike, the race center announced that due to pro-Palestinian protests at the finish, the GC times were to be taken at the 3-kilometre (1.9 mi) mark and that there was going to be no stage winner. On the final climb, Pidcock attacked twice, distancing Vingegaard both times. At the top, Vingegaard gradually made his way back to Pidcock’s wheel while a group containing Almeida, Hindley, Gall, and Jorgenson formed behind the two. Pidcock and Vingegaard worked together to keep their gap over the chasers, crossing the 3-kilometre (1.9 mi) mark 10 seconds ahead of the four chasers. In the GC, Vingegaard extended his lead to 50 seconds on Almeida while Pidcock gained two bonus seconds on Vingegaard at the top of Alto de Pike, reducing his deficit to 56 seconds.

Apart from the protests at the finish which caused the neutralization of the stage, there were more incidents on the stage stemming from the protests. Before the first passage of the finish line, several small white papers were thrown on the road while several protesters tried to invade the road. On the second time up Alto del Vivero, a protester with a banner blocked the road, causing riders to swerve to avoid the banner.

Time gaps at the three-kilometre mark
Rank	Rider	Team	Time
—	Jonas Vingegaard (DEN)	Visma–Lease a Bike	3h 40' 14"
—	Tom Pidcock (GBR)	Q36.5 Pro Cycling Team	+ 0"
—	Jai Hindley (AUS)	Red Bull–Bora–Hansgrohe	+ 10"
—	João Almeida (POR)	UAE Team Emirates XRG	+ 10"
—	Matteo Jorgenson (USA)	Visma–Lease a Bike	+ 10"
—	Felix Gall (AUT)	Decathlon–AG2R La Mondiale	+ 10"
—	Egan Bernal (COL)	Ineos Grenadiers	+ 24"
—	Giulio Ciccone (ITA)	Lidl–Trek	+ 24"
—	Giulio Pellizzari (ITA)	Red Bull–Bora–Hansgrohe	+ 24"
—	Matthew Riccitello (USA)	Israel–Premier Tech	+ 24"

General classification after Stage 11
Rank	Rider	Team	Time
1	Jonas Vingegaard (DEN)	Visma–Lease a Bike	41h 14' 02"
2	João Almeida (POR)	UAE Team Emirates XRG	+ 50"
3	Tom Pidcock (GBR)	Q36.5 Pro Cycling Team	+ 56"
4	Torstein Træen (NOR)	Team Bahrain Victorious	+ 1' 06"
5	Felix Gall (AUT)	Decathlon–AG2R La Mondiale	+ 2' 17"
6	Matteo Jorgenson (USA)	Visma–Lease a Bike	+ 2' 26"
7	Jai Hindley (AUS)	Red Bull–Bora–Hansgrohe	+ 2' 30"
8	Giulio Ciccone (ITA)	Lidl–Trek	+ 2' 33"
9	Giulio Pellizzari (ITA)	Red Bull–Bora–Hansgrohe	+ 2' 44"
10	Matthew Riccitello (USA)	Israel–Premier Tech	+ 3' 11"
