= Alexandre Vinokurov =

Kazakh cyclist

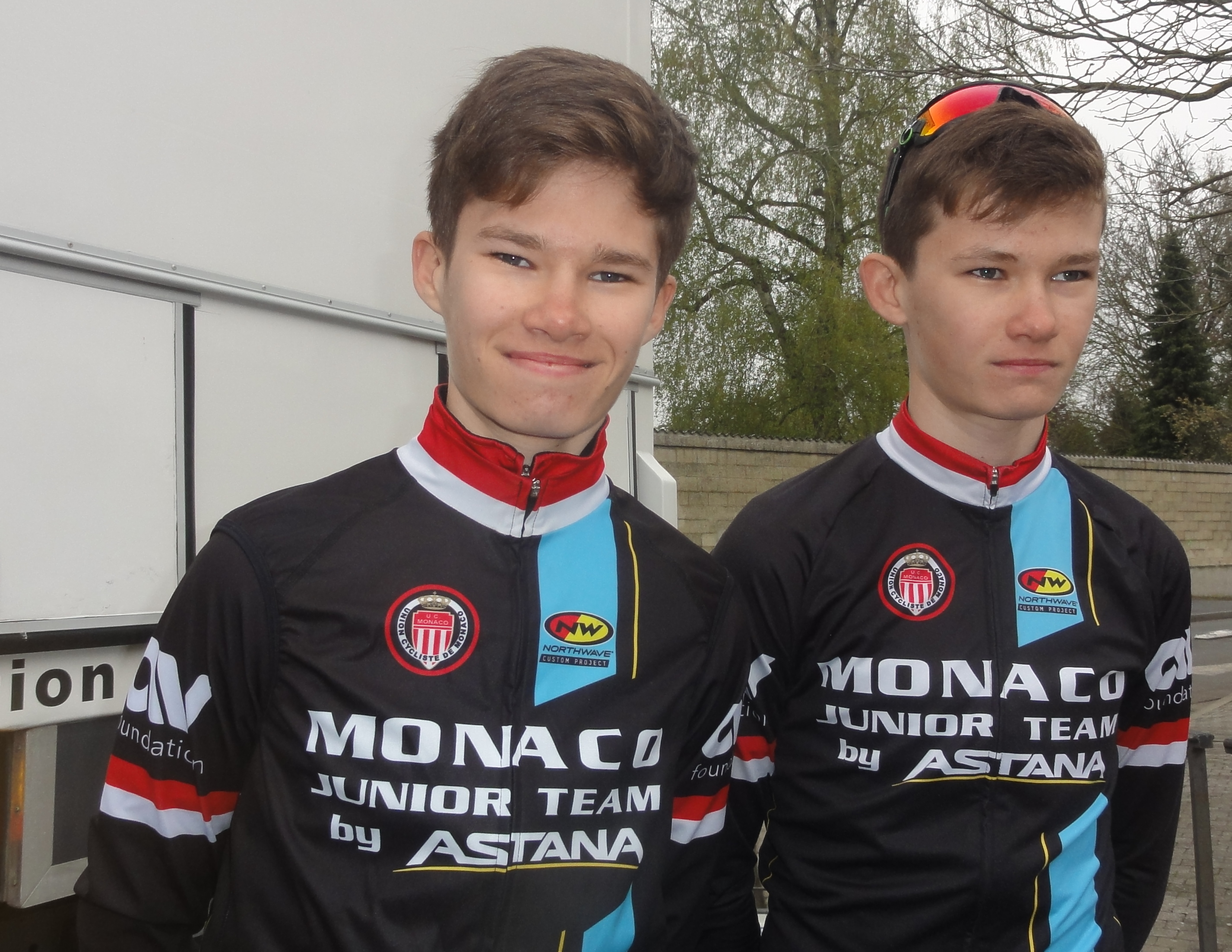
- Vinokurov (left) alongside his brother Nicolas in 2019

Personal information
- Born: 7 July 2002 (age 24) Nice, France
- Height: 1.84 m (6 ft 0 in)
- Weight: 66 kg (146 lb)

Cycling career
- Sport: Cycling
- Discipline: Road
- Role: Rider

Amateur team
- 2021: UC Monaco

Professional teams
- 2021: Vino–Astana Motors (stagiaire)
- 2022–2025: Astana Qazaqstan Development Team

Alexandre Vinokurov (Kazakh: Александр Винокуров; born 7 July 2002) is a Kazakh former cyclist who last rode for UCI Continental team XDS Astana Development Team.

His twin brother Nicolas and his father (also named Alexandre) have competed as professional cyclists.

Alexandre decided to retire in October 2025 at the age of 23, 5 months after suffering injuries in a training incident on March. His last race was at the 2025 Tour de Langkawi.
