= Yannis Voisard =

Swiss cyclist

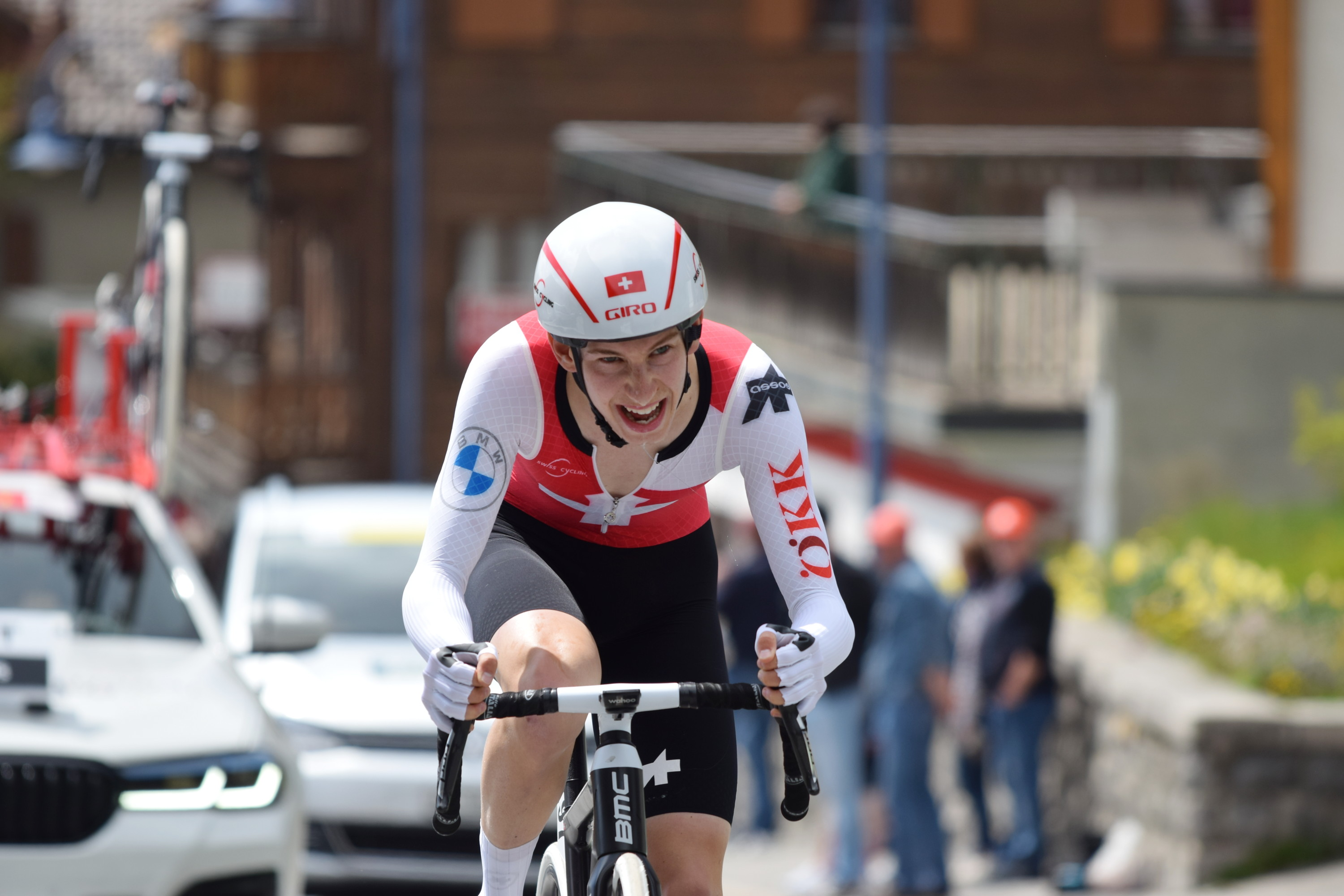
- Voisard at the 2022 Tour de Romandie

Personal information
- Born: 26 July 1998 (age 28) Fontenais, Switzerland
- Weight: 56 kg (123 lb)

Cycling career
- Sport: Cycling
- Current team: Tudor Pro Cycling Team
- Discipline: Road
- Role: Rider
- Rider type: Climber

Amateur team
- 2017: Roth–Akros Devo

Professional teams
- 2018–2019: Akros–Renfer SA
- 2020–: Swiss Racing Academy
- 2021: Arkéa–Samsic (stagiaire)

Yannis Voisard (born 26 July 1998) is a Swiss cyclist, who currently rides for UCI ProTeam Tudor Pro Cycling Team.

== Major results ==
2020
6th Overall Giro Ciclistico d'Italia
2021
7th Overall Giro Ciclistico d'Italia

1st Stage 9

2022
1st Overall Alpes Isère Tour
5th Overall Istrian Spring Trophy
2023 (1 pro win)
2nd Time trial, National Road Championships
3rd Overall Tour de Hongrie

1st Stage 4

7th Overall Giro di Sicilia
2024
4th Time trial, National Road Championships
4th Trofeo Serra de Tramuntana
5th Overall Giro d'Abruzzo
8th Overall Tour de Pologne
10th Overall Tour de Hongrie
2025
3rd Time trial, National Road Championships
3rd Overall Tour de Langkawi
5th Giro della Toscana
2026 (1)
3rd Time trial, National Road Championships
6th Overall AlUla Tour

1st Stage 3

10th Overall Volta ao Algarve

=== Grand Tour general classification results timeline ===
Grand Tour	2025	2026
Giro d'Italia	32	—
Tour de France	—	11
Vuelta a España	—	—

Legend
—	Did not compete
DNF	Did not finish
