= 2026 Volta ao Algarve =

Portuguese cycling race

2026 UCI ProSeries

Race details
- Dates: 18–22 February 2026
- Stages: 5
- Distance: 673.7 km (418.6 mi)
- Winning time: 15h 51' 12"

Results
Jersey awarded to the overall winner	Winner	Juan Ayuso (ESP)	(Lidl–Trek)
	Second	Paul Seixas (FRA)	(Decathlon CMA CGM)
	Third	João Almeida (POR)	(UAE Team Emirates XRG)
Jersey awarded to the points classification winner	Points	Paul Magnier (FRA)	(Soudal–Quick-Step)
Jersey awarded to the mountains classification winner	Mountains	Tomás Contte (ARG)	(Aviludo–Louletano–Loulé)
Jersey awarded to the youth classification winner	Youth	Paul Seixas (FRA)	(Decathlon CMA CGM)
	Team	(United Kingdom) INEOS Grenadiers	

The 2026 Volta ao Algarve (English: Tour of the Algarve) was a road cycling stage race that took place between 18 and 22 February 2026 in the Algarve region of southern Portugal. The race was rated as a category 2.Pro event on the 2026 UCI ProSeries calendar, and was the 52nd edition of the Volta ao Algarve.

== Teams ==
Twelve UCI WorldTeams, three UCI ProTeams, and nine UCI Continental teams made up the 24 teams that participated in the race.

UCI WorldTeams

- Alpecin–Premier Tech
- Decathlon CMA CGM
- EF Education–EasyPost
- INEOS Grenadiers
- Lidl–Trek
- Lotto–Intermarché
- NSN Cycling Team
- Soudal–Quick-Step
- Red Bull–Bora–Hansgrohe
- Team Jayco–AlUla
- Team Picnic–PostNL
- UAE Team Emirates XRG

UCI ProTeams

- Caja Rural–Seguros RGA
- Tudor Pro Cycling Team
- Pinarello–Q36.5 Pro Cycling Team

UCI Continental Teams

- Aviludo–Louletano–Loulé
- Anicolor / Campicarn
- Credibom / LA Alumínios / Marcos Car
- Efapel Cycling
- Feira dos Sofás–Boavista
- Feirense–Beeceler
- GI Group Holding–Simoldes–UDO
- Tavfer–Ovos Matinados–Mortágua
- Team Tavira / Crédito Agrícola

== Route ==
Stage characteristics and winners
Stage	Date	Course	Distance	Type	Stage winner
1	18 February	Vila Real de Santo António to Tavira	183.5 km (114.0 mi)	Flat stage	Paul Magnier (FRA)
2	19 February	Portimão to Fóia (Monchique)	147.2 km (91.5 mi)	Mountain stage	Paul Seixas (FRA)
3	20 February	Vilamoura to Vilamoura	19.5 km (12.1 mi)	Individual time trial	Filippo Ganna (ITA)
4	21 February	Albufeira to Lagos	175.1 km (108.8 mi)	Hilly stage	Paul Magnier (FRA)
5	22 February	Faro to Malhão (Loulé)	148.4 km (92.2 mi)	Mountain stage	Juan Ayuso (ESP)
Total			673.7 km (418.6 mi)		

== Stages ==
=== Stage 1 ===
18 February 2026 – Vila Real de Santo António to Tavira, 183.5 km (114.0 mi)

Stage 1 Result
Rank	Rider	Team	Time
1	Paul Magnier (FRA)	Soudal–Quick-Step	4h 21' 04"
2	Jordi Meeus (BEL)	Red Bull–Bora–Hansgrohe	+ 0"
3	Pavel Bittner (CZE)	Team Picnic–PostNL	+ 0"
4	Jasper Philipsen (BEL)	Alpecin–Premier Tech	+ 0"
5	Arnaud De Lie (BEL)	Lotto–Intermarché	+ 0"
6	Pascal Ackermann (GER)	Team Jayco–AlUla	+ 0"
7	Kaden Groves (AUS)	Alpecin–Premier Tech	+ 0"
8	John Degenkolb (GER)	Team Picnic–PostNL	+ 0"
9	Oded Kogut (ISR)	NSN Cycling Team	+ 0"
10	Rui Oliveira (POR)	UAE Team Emirates XRG	+ 0"

General classification after Stage 1
Rank	Rider	Team	Time
1	Paul Magnier (FRA)	Soudal–Quick-Step	4h 20' 54"
2	Jordi Meeus (BEL)	Red Bull–Bora–Hansgrohe	+ 4"
3	Hugo Nunes (POR)	Credibom / LA Alumínios / Marcos Car	+ 4"
4	Pavel Bittner (CZE)	Team Picnic–PostNL	+ 6"
5	Juan Ayuso (ESP)	Lidl–Trek	+ 7"
6	Jan Tratnik (SLO)	Red Bull–Bora–Hansgrohe	+ 7"
7	Viacheslav Ivanov	Feirense–Beeceler	+ 8"
8	Fabio Christen (SUI)	Pinarello–Q36.5 Pro Cycling Team	+ 8"
9	Ivo Oliveira (POR)	UAE Team Emirates XRG	+ 9"
10	André Ribeiro (POR)	GI Group Holding–Simoldes–UDO	+ 9"

=== Stage 2 ===
19 February 2026 – Portimão to Fóia (Monchique), 147.2 km (91.5 mi)

Stage 2 Result
Rank	Rider	Team	Time
1	Paul Seixas (FRA)	Decathlon CMA CGM	3h 49' 50"
2	Juan Ayuso (ESP)	Lidl–Trek	+ 0"
3	João Almeida (POR)	UAE Team Emirates XRG	+ 1"
4	Oscar Onley (GBR)	INEOS Grenadiers	+ 4"
5	Matthew Riccitello (USA)	Decathlon CMA CGM	+ 6"
6	Daniel Martínez (COL)	Red Bull–Bora–Hansgrohe	+ 22"
7	Alessandro Pinarello (ITA)	NSN Cycling Team	+ 29"
8	Yannis Voisard (SUI)	Tudor Pro Cycling Team	+ 29"
9	Kévin Vauquelin (FRA)	INEOS Grenadiers	+ 29"
10	Thomas Gloag (GBR)	Pinarello–Q36.5 Pro Cycling Team	+ 31"

General classification after Stage 2
Rank	Rider	Team	Time
1	Juan Ayuso (ESP)	Lidl–Trek	8h 10' 44"
2	Paul Seixas (FRA)	Decathlon CMA CGM	+ 0"
3	João Almeida (POR)	UAE Team Emirates XRG	+ 7"
4	Oscar Onley (GBR)	INEOS Grenadiers	+ 14"
5	Matthew Riccitello (USA)	Decathlon CMA CGM	+ 16"
6	Daniel Martínez (COL)	Red Bull–Bora–Hansgrohe	+ 32"
7	Kévin Vauquelin (FRA)	INEOS Grenadiers	+ 39"
8	Alessandro Pinarello (ITA)	NSN Cycling Team	+ 39"
9	Yannis Voisard (SUI)	Tudor Pro Cycling Team	+ 39"
10	Thomas Gloag (GBR)	Pinarello–Q36.5 Pro Cycling Team	+ 41"

=== Stage 3 ===
20 February 2026 – Vilamoura to Vilamoura, 19.5 km (12.1 mi) (ITT)

Stage 3 Result
Rank	Rider	Team	Time
1	Filippo Ganna (ITA)	INEOS Grenadiers	21' 53"
2	Juan Ayuso (ESP)	Lidl–Trek	+ 6"
3	Jakob Söderqvist (SWE)	Lidl–Trek	+ 8"
4	Paul Seixas (FRA)	Decathlon CMA CGM	+ 13"
5	Thymen Arensman (NED)	INEOS Grenadiers	+ 23"
6	Kévin Vauquelin (FRA)	INEOS Grenadiers	+ 24"
7	Stefan Küng (SUI)	Tudor Pro Cycling Team	+ 28"
8	Héctor Álvarez (ESP)	Lidl–Trek	+ 36"
9	Florian Lipowitz (GER)	Red Bull–Bora–Hansgrohe	+ 42"
10	João Almeida (POR)	UAE Team Emirates XRG	+ 43"

General classification after Stage 3
Rank	Rider	Team	Time
1	Juan Ayuso (ESP)	Lidl–Trek	8h 32' 43"
2	Paul Seixas (FRA)	Decathlon CMA CGM	+ 7"
3	João Almeida (POR)	UAE Team Emirates XRG	+ 44"
4	Kévin Vauquelin (FRA)	INEOS Grenadiers	+ 57"
5	Thymen Arensman (NED)	INEOS Grenadiers	+ 1' 01"
6	Daniel Martínez (COL)	Red Bull–Bora–Hansgrohe	+ 1' 12"
7	Oscar Onley (GBR)	INEOS Grenadiers	+ 1' 17"
8	Florian Lipowitz (GER)	Red Bull–Bora–Hansgrohe	+ 1' 17"
9	Matthew Riccitello (USA)	Decathlon CMA CGM	+ 1' 28"
10	Yannis Voisard (SUI)	Tudor Pro Cycling Team	+ 1' 36"

=== Stage 4 ===
21 February 2026 – Albufeira to Lagos, 175.1 km (108.8 mi)

Stage 4 Result
Rank	Rider	Team	Time
1	Paul Magnier (FRA)	Soudal–Quick-Step	3h 58' 38"
2	Jordi Meeus (BEL)	Red Bull–Bora–Hansgrohe	+ 0"
3	Oded Kogut (ISR)	NSN Cycling Team	+ 0"
4	Tim Torn Teutenberg (GER)	Lidl–Trek	+ 0"
5	Hugo Hofstetter (FRA)	NSN Cycling Team	+ 0"
6	Luca Mozzato (ITA)	Tudor Pro Cycling Team	+ 0"
7	Noah Hobbs (GBR)	EF Education–EasyPost	+ 0"
8	Santiago Mesa (COL)	Anicolor / Campicarn	+ 0"
9	Matteo Moschetti (ITA)	Pinarello–Q36.5 Pro Cycling Team	+ 0"
10	Jasper Philipsen (BEL)	Alpecin–Premier Tech	+ 0"

General classification after Stage 4
Rank	Rider	Team	Time
1	Juan Ayuso (ESP)	Lidl–Trek	12h 31' 21"
2	Paul Seixas (FRA)	Decathlon CMA CGM	+ 7"
3	João Almeida (POR)	UAE Team Emirates XRG	+ 44"
4	Kévin Vauquelin (FRA)	INEOS Grenadiers	+ 57"
5	Thymen Arensman (NED)	INEOS Grenadiers	+ 1' 01"
6	Daniel Martínez (COL)	Red Bull–Bora–Hansgrohe	+ 1' 12"
7	Oscar Onley (GBR)	INEOS Grenadiers	+ 1' 17"
8	Florian Lipowitz (GER)	Red Bull–Bora–Hansgrohe	+ 1' 17"
9	Matthew Riccitello (USA)	Decathlon CMA CGM	+ 1' 28"
10	Yannis Voisard (SUI)	Tudor Pro Cycling Team	+ 1' 36"

=== Stage 5 ===
22 February 2026 – Faro to Malhão (Loulé), 148.4 km (92.2 mi)

Stage 5 Result
Rank	Rider	Team	Time
1	Juan Ayuso (ESP)	Lidl–Trek	3h 20' 02"
2	Oscar Onley (GBR)	INEOS Grenadiers	+ 0"
3	Paul Seixas (FRA)	Decathlon CMA CGM	+ 0"
4	João Almeida (POR)	UAE Team Emirates XRG	+ 4"
5	Thomas Gloag (GBR)	Pinarello–Q36.5 Pro Cycling Team	+ 6"
6	Matthew Riccitello (USA)	Decathlon CMA CGM	+ 14"
7	Jarno Widar (BEL)	Lotto–Intermarché	+ 30"
8	Daniel Martínez (COL)	Red Bull–Bora–Hansgrohe	+ 30"
9	Kévin Vauquelin (FRA)	INEOS Grenadiers	+ 34"
10	Dylan van Baarle (NED)	Soudal–Quick-Step	+ 43"

General classification after Stage 5
Rank	Rider	Team	Time
1	Juan Ayuso (ESP)	Lidl–Trek	15h 51' 12"
2	Paul Seixas (FRA)	Decathlon CMA CGM	+ 14"
3	João Almeida (POR)	UAE Team Emirates XRG	+ 59"
4	Oscar Onley (GBR)	INEOS Grenadiers	+ 1' 22"
5	Kévin Vauquelin (FRA)	INEOS Grenadiers	+ 1' 40"
6	Matthew Riccitello (USA)	Decathlon CMA CGM	+ 1' 53"
7	Daniel Martínez (COL)	Red Bull–Bora–Hansgrohe	+ 1' 53"
8	Florian Lipowitz (GER)	Red Bull–Bora–Hansgrohe	+ 2' 15"
9	Thymen Arensman (NED)	INEOS Grenadiers	+ 2' 18"
10	Yannis Voisard (SUI)	Tudor Pro Cycling Team	+ 2' 35"

== Classification leadership table ==
Classification leadership by stage
Stage	Winner	General classification	Points classification	Mountains classification	Young rider classification	Team classification
1	Paul Magnier	Paul Magnier	Paul Magnier	Tomás Contte	Paul Magnier	Lidl–Trek
2	Paul Seixas	Juan Ayuso	Paul Seixas	Tomás Contte	Paul Seixas	INEOS Grenadiers
3	Filippo Ganna	Juan Ayuso	Paul Seixas	Tomás Contte	Paul Seixas	INEOS Grenadiers
4	Paul Magnier	Juan Ayuso	Paul Magnier	Tomás Contte	Paul Seixas	INEOS Grenadiers
5	Juan Ayuso	Juan Ayuso	Paul Magnier	Tomás Contte	Paul Seixas	INEOS Grenadiers
Final		Juan Ayuso	Paul Magnier	Tomás Contte	Paul Seixas	Ineos Grenadiers

== Classification standings ==
Legend
Denotes the winner of the general classification	Denotes the winner of the mountains classification
Denotes the winner of the points classification	Denotes the winner of the young rider classification

=== General classification ===
Final general classification (1–10)
Rank	Rider	Team	Time
1	Juan Ayuso (ESP)	Lidl–Trek	15h 51' 12"
2	Paul Seixas (FRA)	Decathlon CMA CGM	+ 14"
3	João Almeida (POR)	UAE Team Emirates XRG	+ 59"
4	Oscar Onley (GBR)	INEOS Grenadiers	+ 1' 22"
5	Kévin Vauquelin (FRA)	INEOS Grenadiers	+ 1' 40"
6	Matthew Riccitello (USA)	Decathlon CMA CGM	+ 1' 53"
7	Daniel Martínez (COL)	Red Bull–Bora–Hansgrohe	+ 1' 53"
8	Florian Lipowitz (GER)	Red Bull–Bora–Hansgrohe	+ 2' 15"
9	Thymen Arensman (NED)	INEOS Grenadiers	+ 2' 18"
10	Yannis Voisard (SUI)	Tudor Pro Cycling Team	+ 2' 35"

=== Points classification ===
Final points classification (1–10)
Rank	Rider	Team	Points
1	Paul Magnier (FRA)	Soudal–Quick-Step	53
2	Juan Ayuso (ESP)	Lidl–Trek	50
3	Paul Seixas (FRA)	Decathlon CMA CGM	41
4	Jordi Meeus (BEL)	Red Bull–Bora–Hansgrohe	40
5	Oscar Onley (GBR)	INEOS Grenadiers	33
6	João Almeida (POR)	UAE Team Emirates XRG	29
7	Matthew Riccitello (USA)	Decathlon CMA CGM	18
8	Pavel Bittner (CZE)	Team Picnic–PostNL	16
9	Hugo Nunes (POR)	Credibom / LA Alumínios / Marcos Car	15
10	Jasper Philipsen (BEL)	Alpecin–Premier Tech	14

=== Mountains classification ===
Final mountains classification (1–10)
Rank	Rider	Team	Points
1	Tomás Contte (ARG)	Aviludo–Louletano–Loulé	18
2	Juan Ayuso (ESP)	Lidl–Trek	14
3	Paul Seixas (FRA)	Decathlon CMA CGM	13
4	Maximilian Schachmann (GER)	Soudal–Quick-Step	9
5	João Almeida (POR)	UAE Team Emirates XRG	8
6	Oscar Onley (GBR)	INEOS Grenadiers	8
7	Julian Alaphilippe (FRA)	Tudor Pro Cycling Team	7
8	Nicolás Tivani (ARG)	Aviludo–Louletano–Loulé	4
9	Florian Lipowitz (GER)	Red Bull–Bora–Hansgrohe	3
10	Tobias Bayer (AUT)	Alpecin–Premier Tech	3

=== Young rider classification ===
Final young rider classification (1–10)
Rank	Rider	Team	Time
1	Paul Seixas (FRA)	Decathlon CMA CGM	15h 51' 26"
2	Juan Guillermo Martínez (COL)	Team Picnic–PostNL	+ 4' 18"
3	Héctor Álvarez (ESP)	Lidl–Trek	+ 4' 23"
4	Jarno Widar (BEL)	Lotto–Intermarché	+ 5' 23"
5	Duarte Domingues (POR)	Credibom / LA Alumínios / Marcos Car	+ 14' 26"
6	Gonçalo Tavares (POR)	Efapel Cycling	+ 17' 20"
7	Rafael Barbas (POR)	Tavfer–Ovos Matinados–Mortágua	+ 24' 39"
8	Paul Magnier (FRA)	Soudal–Quick-Step	+ 25' 12"
9	Jens Verbrugghe (BEL)	NSN Cycling Team	+ 29' 47"
10	Pablo Lospitao (ESP)	Caja Rural–Seguros RGA	+ 31' 23"

=== Teams classification ===
Final teams classification (1–10)
Rank	Team	Time
1	(United Kingdom) INEOS Grenadiers	47h 37' 55"
2	(United Arab Emirates) UAE Team Emirates XRG	+ 10' 21"
3	(Germany) Lidl–Trek	+ 10' 48"
4	(France) Decathlon CMA CGM	+ 11' 00"
5	(Switzerland) Pinarello–Q36.5 Pro Cycling Team	+ 11' 22"
6	(Switzerland) Tudor Pro Cycling Team	+ 12' 07"
7	(Germany) Red Bull–Bora–Hansgrohe	+ 13' 45"
8	(United States) EF Education–EasyPost	+ 16' 58"
9	(Australia) Team Jayco–AlUla	+ 17' 28"
10	(Belgium) Lotto–Intermarché	+ 22' 35"
