= 2026 AlUla Tour =

Saudi Arabian cycling race

2026 UCI ProSeries, race 1 of 61

Race details
- Dates: 27–31 January 2026
- Stages: 5
- Distance: 789.4 km (490.5 mi)
- Winning time: 17h 23' 43"

Results
Jersey awarded to the overall winner	Winner	Jan Christen (SUI)	(UAE Team Emirates XRG)
	Second	Sergio Higuita (COL)	(XDS Astana Team)
	Third	Igor Arrieta (ESP)	(UAE Team Emirates XRG)
Jersey awarded to the points classification winner	Points	Jonathan Milan (ITA)	(Lidl–Trek)
Jersey awarded to the youth classification winner	Youth	Jan Christen (SUI)	(UAE Team Emirates XRG)
Jersey awarded to the sprints classification winner	Sprints	Zhe Yie Kee (MAS)	(Terengganu Cycling Team)
	Team	(United Arab Emirates) UAE Team Emirates XRG	

The 2026 AlUla Tour was a road cycling stage race that took place between 27 and 31 January 2026 in Saudi Arabia. The race was rated as a category 2. Pro event on the 2026 UCI ProSeries calendar and was the tenth edition of the Saudi Tour.

== Teams ==
Seventeen teams entered the race, including seven UCI WorldTeams, six UCI ProTeams, two UCI Continental teams and two national teams.

UCI WorldTeams

- Lidl–Trek
- Soudal–Quick-Step
- Team Bahrain Victorious
- Team Jayco–AlUla
- Team Picnic–PostNL
- UAE Team Emirates XRG
- XDS Astana Team

UCI ProTeams

- Caja Rural–Seguros RGA
- Cofidis
- Modern Adventure Pro Cycling
- Pinarello–Q36.5 Pro Cycling Team
- Team TotalEnergies
- Tudor Pro Cycling Team

UCI Continental Teams

- Team Ukyo
- Terengganu Cycling Team

National teams

- Oman
- Saudi Arabia

== Route ==
Stage characteristics and winners
Stage	Date	Course	Distance	Type	Stage winner
1	27 January	AlUla Camel Cup Track to AlUla Camel Cup Track	158 km (98 mi)	Flat stage	Jonathan Milan (ITA)
2	28 January	Al Manshiyah Train Station to Al Manshiyah Train Station	152 km (94 mi)	Flat stage	Jonathan Milan (ITA)
3	29 January	Winter Park to Bir Jaydah Mountain Wirkah	142.1 km (88.3 mi)	Hilly stage	Yannis Voisard (SUI)
4	30 January	Winter Park to Hegra	173.4 km (107.7 mi)	Flat stage	Matteo Malucelli (ITA)
5	31 January	AlUla Old Town to Skyviews of Harrat Uwayrid	163.9 km (101.8 mi)	Hilly stage	Jan Christen (SUI)
Total			789.4 km (490.5 mi)		

== Stages ==
=== Stage 1 ===
27 January 2026 — AlUla Camel Cup Track to AlUla Camel Cup Track, 158 km (98 mi)

Stage 1 Result (1–10)
Rank	Rider	Team	Time
1	Jonathan Milan (ITA)	Lidl–Trek	3h 36' 32"
2	Milan Fretin (BEL)	Cofidis	+ 0"
3	Matteo Moschetti (ITA)	Pinarello–Q36.5 Pro Cycling Team	+ 0"
4	Laurenz Rex (BEL)	Soudal–Quick-Step	+ 0"
5	Lorrenzo Manzin (FRA)	Team TotalEnergies	+ 0"
6	Hugo Page (FRA)	Cofidis	+ 0"
7	Phil Bauhaus (GER)	Team Bahrain Victorious	+ 0"
8	Fernando Gaviria (COL)	Caja Rural–Seguros RGA	+ 0"
9	Timo de Jong (NED)	Team Picnic–PostNL	+ 2"
10	Aivaras Mikutis (LTU)	Tudor Pro Cycling Team	+ 4"

General classification after Stage 1 (1–10)
Rank	Rider	Team	Time
1	Jonathan Milan (ITA)	Lidl–Trek	3h 36' 22"
2	Milan Fretin (BEL)	Cofidis	+ 4"
3	Matteo Moschetti (ITA)	Pinarello–Q36.5 Pro Cycling Team	+ 6"
4	Laurenz Rex (BEL)	Soudal–Quick-Step	+ 10"
5	Lorrenzo Manzin (FRA)	Team TotalEnergies	+ 10"
6	Hugo Page (FRA)	Cofidis	+ 10"
7	Phil Bauhaus (GER)	Team Bahrain Victorious	+ 10"
8	Fernando Gaviria (COL)	Caja Rural–Seguros RGA	+ 10"
9	Mark Donovan (GBR)	Pinarello–Q36.5 Pro Cycling Team	+ 11"
10	Timo de Jong (NED)	Team Picnic–PostNL	+ 12"

=== Stage 2 ===
28 January 2026 — Al Manshiyah Train Station to Al Manshiyah Train Station, 152 km (94 mi)

Stage 2 Result (1–10)
Rank	Rider	Team	Time
1	Jonathan Milan (ITA)	Lidl–Trek	3h 17' 59"
2	Daniel Skerl (ITA)	Team Bahrain Victorious	+ 0"
3	Pascal Ackermann (GER)	Team Jayco–AlUla	+ 0"
4	Matteo Moschetti (ITA)	Pinarello–Q36.5 Pro Cycling Team	+ 0"
5	Matteo Malucelli (ITA)	XDS Astana Team	+ 0"
6	Robin Froidevaux (SUI)	Tudor Pro Cycling Team	+ 0"
7	Jason Tesson (FRA)	Team TotalEnergies	+ 0"
8	Milan Fretin (BEL)	Cofidis	+ 0"
9	Timo de Jong (NED)	Team Picnic–PostNL	+ 0"
10	Milan Vader (NED)	Pinarello–Q36.5 Pro Cycling Team	+ 0"

General classification after Stage 2 (1–10)
Rank	Rider	Team	Time
1	Jonathan Milan (ITA)	Soudal–Quick-Step	6h 54' 11"
2	Milan Fretin (BEL)	Cofidis	+ 14"
3	Matteo Moschetti (ITA)	Pinarello–Q36.5 Pro Cycling Team	+ 16"
4	Laurenz Rex (BEL)	Soudal–Quick-Step	+ 20"
5	Fernando Gaviria (COL)	Caja Rural–Seguros RGA	+ 20"
6	Mark Donovan (GBR)	Pinarello–Q36.5 Pro Cycling Team	+ 21"
7	Timo de Jong (NED)	Team Picnic–PostNL	+ 22"
8	Edoardo Zamperini (ITA)	Cofidis	+ 24"
9	Dries De Bondt (BEL)	Team Jayco–AlUla	+ 27"
10	Kevin Vermaerke (USA)	UAE Team Emirates XRG	+ 29"

=== Stage 3 ===
29 January 2026 — Winter Park to Bir Jaydah Mountain Wirkah, 142.1 km (88.3 mi)

Stage 3 Result (1–10)
Rank	Rider	Team	Time
1	Yannis Voisard (SUI)	Tudor Pro Cycling Team	3h 22' 00"
2	Afonso Eulálio (POR)	Team Bahrain Victorious	+ 0"
3	Sergio Higuita (COL)	XDS Astana Team	+ 0"
4	Henok Mulubrhan (ERI)	XDS Astana Team	+ 6"
5	Mauri Vansevenant (BEL)	Soudal–Quick-Step	+ 6"
6	Nicolas Vinokurov (KAZ)	XDS Astana Team	+ 6"
7	Igor Arrieta (ESP)	UAE Team Emirates XRG	+ 6"
8	Bjoern Koerdt (GBR)	Team Picnic–PostNL	+ 6"
9	Jan Christen (SUI)	UAE Team Emirates XRG	+ 6"
10	Jan Castellon (ESP)	Caja Rural–Seguros RGA	+ 6"

General classification after Stage 3 (1–10)
Rank	Rider	Team	Time
1	Yannis Voisard (SUI)	Tudor Pro Cycling Team	10h 16' 32"
2	Afonso Eulálio (POR)	Team Bahrain Victorious	+ 4"
3	Sergio Higuita (COL)	XDS Astana Team	+ 6"
4	Bjoern Koerdt (GBR)	Team Picnic–PostNL	+ 15"
5	Mauri Vansevenant (BEL)	Soudal–Quick-Step	+ 16"
6	Igor Arrieta (ESP)	UAE Team Emirates XRG	+ 16"
7	Nicolas Vinokurov (KAZ)	XDS Astana Team	+ 16"
8	Jan Castellon (ESP)	Caja Rural–Seguros RGA	+ 16"
9	Nicolò Garibbo (ITA)	Team Ukyo	+ 16"
10	Henok Mulubrhan (ERI)	XDS Astana Team	+ 16"

=== Stage 4 ===
30 January 2026 — Winter Park to Hegra, 173.4 km (107.7 mi)

Stage 4 Result (1–10)
Rank	Rider	Team	Time
1	Matteo Malucelli (ITA)	XDS Astana Team	3h 30' 43"
2	Jonathan Milan (ITA)	Lidl–Trek	+ 0"
3	Frits Biesterbos (NED)	Team Picnic–PostNL	+ 0"
4	Robin Froidevaux (SUI)	Tudor Pro Cycling Team	+ 0"
5	Jason Tesson (FRA)	Team TotalEnergies	+ 0"
6	Matteo Moschetti (ITA)	Pinarello–Q36.5 Pro Cycling Team	+ 0"
7	Phil Bauhaus (GER)	Team Bahrain Victorious	+ 0"
8	Bert Van Lerberghe (BEL)	Soudal–Quick-Step	+ 0"
9	Riley Pickrell (CAN)	Modern Adventure Pro Cycling	+ 0"
10	Nicolas Vinokurov (KAZ)	XDS Astana Team	+ 0"

General classification after Stage 4 (1–10)
Rank	Rider	Team	Time
1	Yannis Voisard (SUI)	Tudor Pro Cycling Team	13h 47' 15"
2	Afonso Eulálio (POR)	Team Bahrain Victorious	+ 4"
3	Sergio Higuita (COL)	XDS Astana Team	+ 6"
4	Bjoern Koerdt (GBR)	Team Picnic–PostNL	+ 15"
5	Mauri Vansevenant (BEL)	Soudal–Quick-Step	+ 16"
6	Nicolas Vinokurov (KAZ)	XDS Astana Team	+ 16"
7	Igor Arrieta (ESP)	UAE Team Emirates XRG	+ 16"
8	Nicolò Garibbo (ITA)	Team Ukyo	+ 16"
9	Henok Mulubrhan (ERI)	XDS Astana Team	+ 16"
10	Jan Castellon (ESP)	Caja Rural–Seguros RGA	+ 16"

=== Stage 5 ===
31 January 2026 — AlUla Old Town to Skyviews of Harrat Uwayrid, 163.9 km (101.8 mi)

Stage 5 Result (1–10)
Rank	Rider	Team	Time
1	Jan Christen (SUI)	UAE Team Emirates XRG	3h 36' 05"
2	Byron Munton (RSA)	Modern Adventure Pro Cycling	+ 11"
3	Igor Arrieta (ESP)	UAE Team Emirates XRG	+ 32"
4	Juan Pedro Lozano (ESP)	Terengganu Cycling Team	+ 32"
5	Federico Iacomoni (ITA)	Team Ukyo	+ 32"
6	Sergio Higuita (COL)	XDS Astana Team	+ 32"
7	Stefan De Bod (RSA)	Modern Adventure Pro Cycling	+ 32"
8	Kevin Vermaerke (USA)	UAE Team Emirates XRG	+ 39"
9	Nicolas Vinokurov (KAZ)	XDS Astana Team	+ 42"
10	Jamie Meehan (IRL)	Cofidis	+ 44"

General classification after Stage 5 (1–10)
Rank	Rider	Team	Time
1	Jan Christen (SUI)	UAE Team Emirates XRG	17h 23' 43"
2	Sergio Higuita (COL)	XDS Astana Team	+ 13"
3	Igor Arrieta (ESP)	UAE Team Emirates XRG	+ 21"
4	Stefan De Bod (RSA)	Modern Adventure Pro Cycling	+ 25"
5	Afonso Eulálio (POR)	Team Bahrain Victorious	+ 29"
6	Yannis Voisard (SUI)	Tudor Pro Cycling Team	+ 34"
7	Nicolas Vinokurov (KAZ)	XDS Astana Team	+ 35"
8	Mauri Vansevenant (BEL)	Soudal–Quick-Step	+ 36"
9	Jan Castellon (ESP)	Caja Rural–Seguros RGA	+ 37"
10	Bjoern Koerdt (GBR)	Team Picnic–PostNL	+ 38"

== Classification leadership table ==
Classification leadership by stage
Stage	Winner	General classification	Points classification	Active rider classification	Young rider classification	Team classification
1	Jonathan Milan	Jonathan Milan	Jonathan Milan	Mark Donovan	Milan Fretin	Cofidis
2	Jonathan Milan	Jonathan Milan	Jonathan Milan	Mark Donovan	Milan Fretin	Cofidis
3	Yannis Voisard	Yannis Voisard	Jonathan Milan	Zhe Yie Kee	Afonso Eulálio	XDS Astana Team
4	Matteo Malucelli	Yannis Voisard	Jonathan Milan	Zhe Yie Kee	Afonso Eulálio	XDS Astana Team
5	Jan Christen	Jan Christen	Jonathan Milan	Zhe Yie Kee	Jan Christen	UAE Team Emirates XRG
Final		Jan Christen	Jonathan Milan	Zhe Yie Kee	Jan Christen	UAE Team Emirates XRG

== Classification standings ==
Legend
Denotes the winner of the general classification	Denotes the winner of the points classification
Denotes the winner of the active rider classification	Denotes the winner of the young rider classification
Denotes the winner of the team classification	

=== General classification ===
Final general classification (1–10)
Rank	Rider	Team	Time
1	Jan Christen (SUI)	UAE Team Emirates XRG	17h 23' 43"
2	Sergio Higuita (COL)	XDS Astana Team	+ 13"
3	Igor Arrieta (ESP)	UAE Team Emirates XRG	+ 21"
4	Stefan De Bod (RSA)	Modern Adventure Pro Cycling	+ 25"
5	Afonso Eulálio (POR)	Team Bahrain Victorious	+ 29"
6	Yannis Voisard (SUI)	Tudor Pro Cycling Team	+ 34"
7	Nicolas Vinokurov (KAZ)	XDS Astana Team	+ 35"
8	Mauri Vansevenant (BEL)	Soudal–Quick-Step	+ 36"
9	Jan Castellon (ESP)	Caja Rural–Seguros RGA	+ 37"
10	Bjoern Koerdt (GBR)	Team Picnic–PostNL	+ 38"

=== Points classification ===
Final points classification (1–10)
Rank	Rider	Team	Points
1	Jonathan Milan (ITA)	Lidl–Trek	42
2	Matteo Malucelli (ITA)	XDS Astana Team	21
3	Matteo Moschetti (ITA)	Pinarello–Q36.5 Pro Cycling Team	21
4	Yannis Voisard (SUI)	Tudor Pro Cycling Team	15
5	Milan Fretin (BEL)	Cofidis	15
6	Jan Christen (SUI)	UAE Team Emirates XRG	14
7	Sergio Higuita (COL)	XDS Astana Team	14
8	Igor Arrieta (ESP)	UAE Team Emirates XRG	13
9	Afonso Eulálio (POR)	Team Bahrain Victorious	12
10	Byron Munton (RSA)	Modern Adventure Pro Cycling	12

=== Active rider classification ===
Final active rider classification (1–10)
Rank	Rider	Team	Points
1	Zhe Yie Kee (MAS)	Terengganu Cycling Team	9
2	Dries De Bondt (BEL)	Team Jayco–AlUla	7
3	Nur Aiman Rosli (MAS)	Terengganu Cycling Team	5
4	Mark Donovan (GBR)	Pinarello–Q36.5 Pro Cycling Team	4
5	Federico Iacomoni (ITA)	Team Ukyo	4
6	Bruno Kessler (GER)	Tudor Pro Cycling Team	4
7	Juan Pedro Lozano (ESP)	Terengganu Cycling Team	4
8	Aivaras Mikutis (LTU)	Tudor Pro Cycling Team	4
9	Jakob Söderqvist (SWE)	Lidl–Trek	4
10	Jan Christen (SUI)	UAE Team Emirates XRG	3

=== Young rider classification ===
Final young rider classification (1–10)
Rank	Rider	Team	Time
1	Jan Christen (SUI)	UAE Team Emirates XRG	17h 23' 43"
2	Igor Arrieta (ESP)	UAE Team Emirates XRG	+ 21"
3	Afonso Eulálio (POR)	Team Bahrain Victorious	+ 29"
4	Nicolas Vinokurov (KAZ)	XDS Astana Team	+ 35"
5	Jan Castellon (ESP)	Caja Rural–Seguros RGA	+ 37"
6	Bjoern Koerdt (GBR)	Team Picnic–PostNL	+ 38"
7	Mathis Le Berre (FRA)	Team TotalEnergies	+ 1' 20"
8	Gianmarco Garofoli (ITA)	Soudal–Quick-Step	+ 2' 01"
9	Frits Biesterbos (NED)	Team Picnic–PostNL	+ 2' 30"
10	Tommaso Dati (ITA)	Team Ukyo	+ 2' 55"

=== Teams classification ===
Final team classification (1–10)
Rank	Team	Time
1	(United Arab Emirates) UAE Team Emirates XRG	52h 12' 08"
2	(Kazakhstan) XDS Astana Team	+ 34"
3	(Switzerland) Pinarello–Q36.5 Pro Cycling Team	+ 2' 06"
4	(Japan) Team Ukyo	+ 2' 53"
5	(France) Cofidis	+ 4' 39"
6	(Spain) Caja Rural–Seguros RGA	+ 4' 56"
7	(France) Team TotalEnergies	+ 5' 15"
8	(Australia) Team Jayco–AlUla	+ 6' 50"
9	(Germany) Lidl–Trek	+ 7' 25"
10	(Netherlands) Team Picnic–PostNL	+ 7' 26"
