= Sinuhé Fernández =

Spanish cyclist (born 2000)

Personal information
- Full name: Sinuhé Fernández Rodríguez
- Born: 15 June 2000 (age 26) Brañes, Oviedo, Spain
- Height: 1.80 m (5 ft 11 in)
- Weight: 60 kg (132 lb)

Cycling career
- Sport: Cycling
- Current team: Burgos Burpellet BH
- Discipline: Road
- Role: Rider
- Rider type: Climber

Amateur teams
- 2018: Ciudad de Oviedo–Tartiere Auto U19
- 2019–2022: Lizarte
- 2023: Equipo Cortizo
- 2024: Padronés Cortizo

Professional teams
- 2022: Equipo Kern Pharma (stagiaire)
- 2023: Burgos BH (stagiaire)
- 2024–: Burgos BH

Sinuhé Fernández Rodríguez (born 15 June 2000) is a Spanish cyclist, who currently rides for UCI ProTeam Burgos Burpellet BH.

== Major results ==
2021
1st Subida a Urraki
8th Ronde de l'Isard
2022
2nd Overall Vuelta al Bidasoa

1st Stage 3

2024
10th Overall Trans-Himalaya Cycling Race
2026
Combativity award Stage 8 Vuelta a España

=== Grand Tour general classification results timeline ===
Grand Tour	2025
Giro d'Italia	—
Tour de France	—
Vuelta a España	DNF

Legend
—	Did not compete
DNF	Did not finish
IP	In progress
