= Bjoern Koerdt =

British cyclist

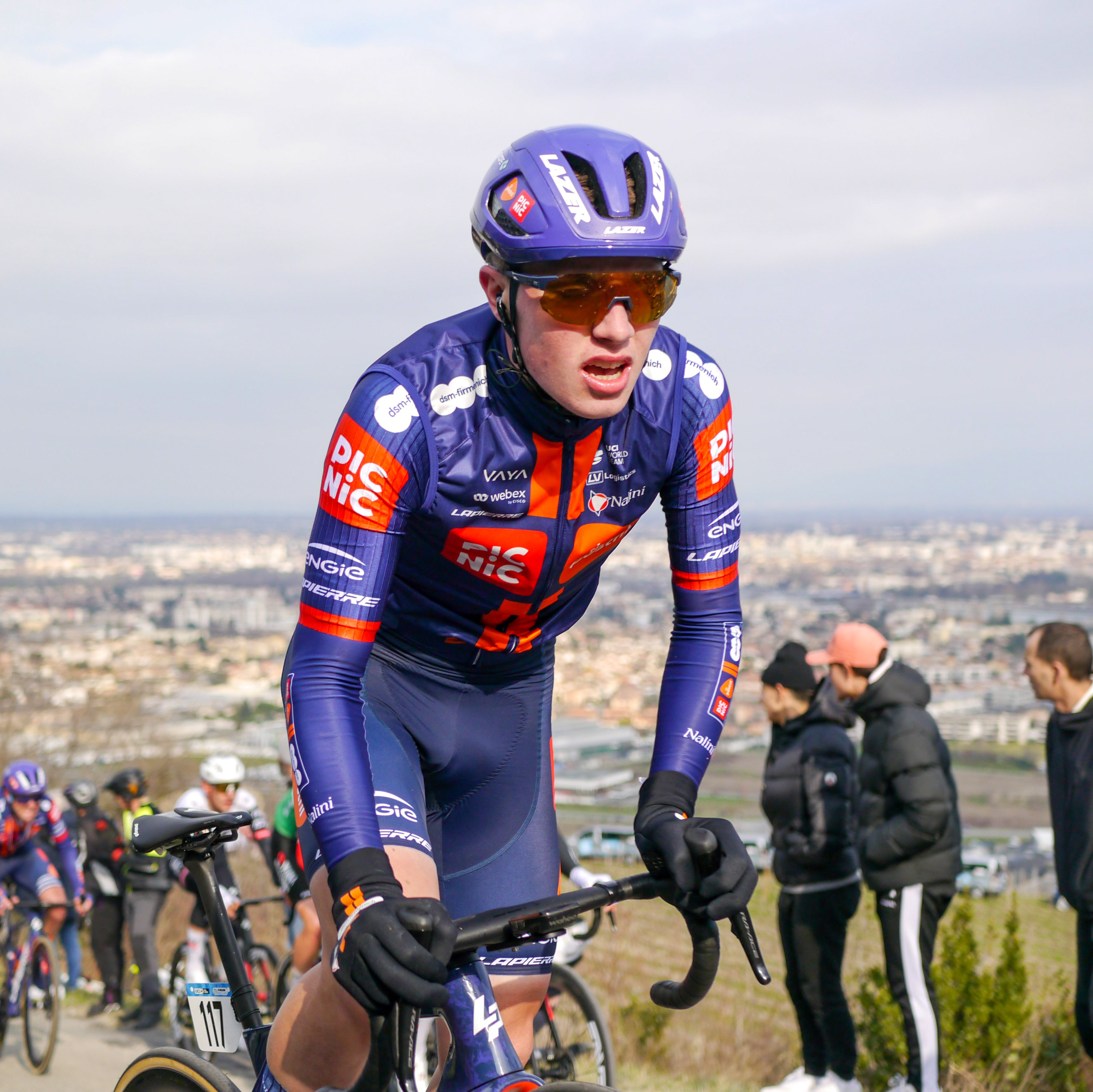
- Koerdt in 2025

Personal information
- Born: 20 July 2004 (age 22) Leeds, England

Cycling career
- Sport: Cycling
- Current team: Team Picnic–PostNL
- Discipline: Road
- Role: Rider

Amateur team
- 2023–2024: CC Étupes

Professional teams
- 2024: Team dsm–firmenich PostNL (stagiaire)
- 2025–: Team Picnic–PostNL

Bjoern Koerdt (born 20 July 2004) is a British cyclist who rides for UCI WorldTeam Team Picnic–PostNL.

== Early life ==
He is from Bramhope near Otley in Yorkshire and attended Bramhope Primary School. He began competing at five years-of-age, and won the Under-12 Yorkshire Cyclo-cross Championship in 2014 as a ten-year-old. The following summer he raised money for a children's hospice by riding to the top of Alpe d'Huez, completing the 110 km stage, in 5 hours 51 minutes the day before the professional riders at the Tour De France. He later attended St Mary's Menston Catholic Voluntary Academy in Menston, West Yorkshire.

== Career ==
In November 2022, he was named as part of the British U23 team to compete at the Cyclo-cross European Championships in Belgium.

He began riding for French team CC Étupes in 2023, and that season secured his first top-five finish on the continent at the Puyloubier Grand Prix.

During the 2024 season he had victories at the Boucle de l'Artois and Tour du Charollais. For the 2025 season he signed for UCI WorldTeam Team Picnic–PostNL a two-year professional contract after a brief spell as a stagiaire from August 2024.

== Personal life ==
His father, Lars, is a German engineer who also cycled competitively.

== Major results ==
2024
1st Overall Boucle de l'Artois
1st Tour du Charollais
2025
2nd Circuit race, National Road Championships
2026
10th Overall AlUla Tour

=== Grand Tour general classification results timeline ===
Grand Tour	2025
Giro d'Italia	—
Tour de France	—
Vuelta a España	92

Legend
—	Did not compete
DNF	Did not finish
