= Jordan Labrosse =

French cyclist

Personal information
- Born: 15 September 2002 (age 24) Cours-la-Ville, France

Cycling career
- Sport: Cycling
- Current team: Decathlon CMA CGM Team
- Discipline: Road
- Role: Rider

Amateur team
- 2021–2023: AG2R Citroën U23 Team

Professional team
- 2023–: AG2R Citroën Team

Jordan Labrosse (born 15 September 2002) is a French cyclist, who currently rides for UCI WorldTeam Decathlon CMA CGM Team.

== Major results ==
2019
8th Overall Ain Bugey Valromey Tour
2020
3rd Overall La Philippe Gilbert juniors

1st Stage 2

2021
6th Overall Tour du Pays de Montbéliard
10th Overall Tour de Bretagne
2022
1st Ruota d'Oro
1st Stage 3 Kreiz Breizh Elites
3rd Il Piccolo Lombardia
7th Paris–Tours Espoirs
2023
5th Overall Orlen Nations Grand Prix
6th Overall Tour du Loir-et-Cher
2024
4th Cholet-Pays de la Loire
6th Route Adélie
9th Classic Loire Atlantique
2025
4th Clásica Jaén Paraíso Interior
10th Vuelta a Murcia
2026
2nd Team relay, UCI Road World Championships
