= José Luis Faura =

Spanish cyclist (born 2000)

Personal information
- Full name: José Luis Faura Asensio
- Born: 15 September 2000 (age 26) Pliego, Spain
- Height: 1.82 m (6 ft 0 in)
- Weight: 67 kg (148 lb)

Cycling career
- Sport: Cycling
- Current team: Burgos Burpellet BH
- Discipline: Road
- Role: Rider

Amateur teams
- 2020: Cartagena–Patatas Pijo–Esetec
- 2021: ULB Sports–Safir Fruits
- 2022: Valverde Team-Ricardo Fuentes
- 2024: Padronés Cortizo

Professional teams
- 2023: Electro Hiper Europa
- 2025–: Burgos Burpellet BH

José Luis Faura Asensio (born 15 September 2000) is a Spanish cyclist, who currently rides for UCI ProTeam Burgos Burpellet BH.

== Major results ==
2022
3rd Memorial Valenciaga
2024
1st Overall Vuelta a Extremadura
1st Overall Volta a Galicia
1st Overall Gran Premi Vila-real

1st Points classification
1st Mountains classification

2nd Overall Vuelta a Ávila

1st Stage 3

2025
10th Overall Route d'Occitanie

=== Grand Tour general classification results timeline ===
Grand Tour	2025
Giro d'Italia	—
Tour de France	—
Vuelta a España	IP

Legend
—	Did not compete
DNF	Did not finish
IP	In progress
