= Nicolas Vinokurov =

Kazakh cyclist

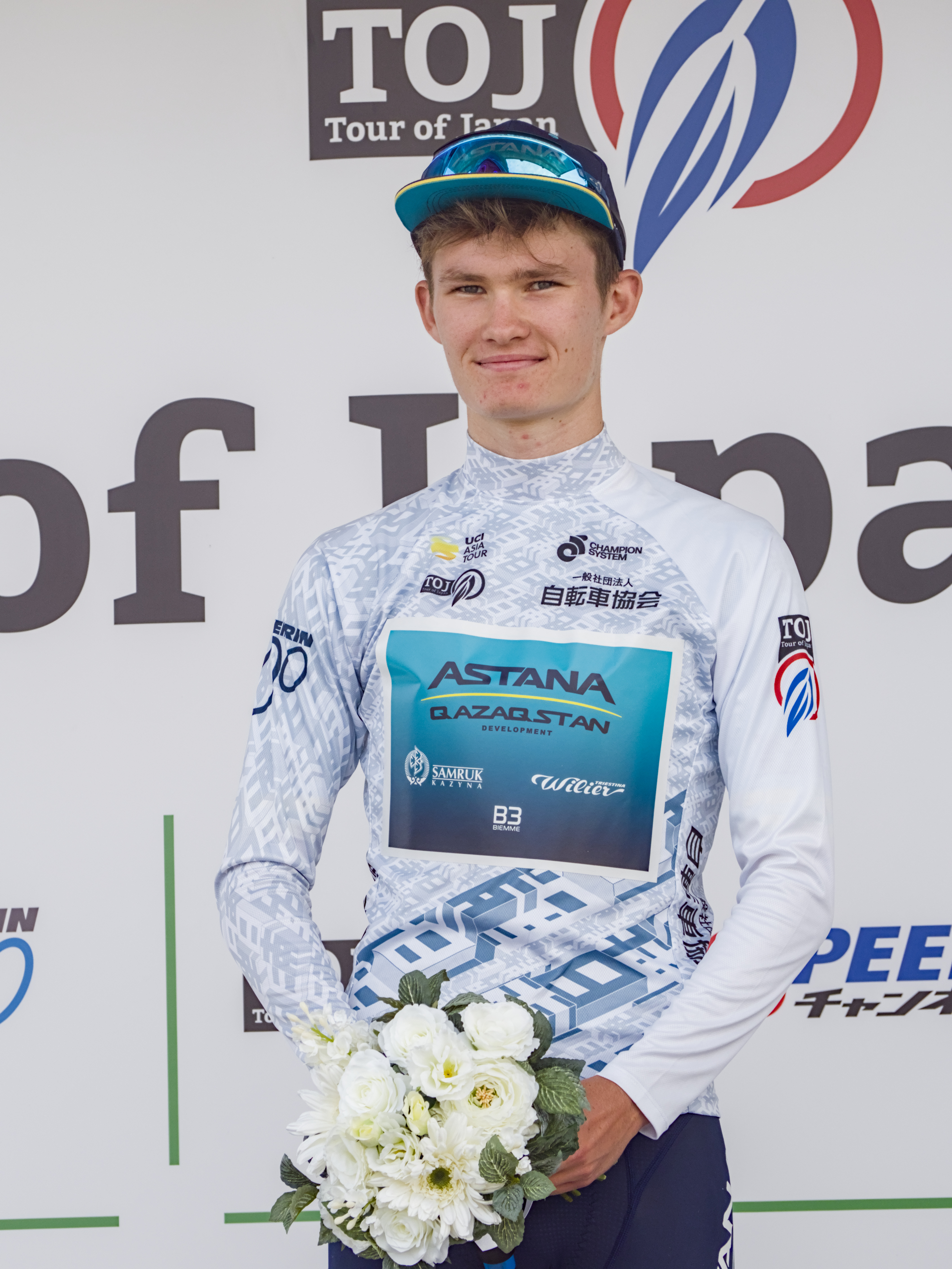
- Vinokurov on the podium as the winner of Young rider classification (white jersey) of Tour of Japan 2024.

Personal information
- Born: 7 July 2002 (age 24) Nice, France
- Height: 1.84 m (6 ft 0 in)

Cycling career
- Sport: Cycling
- Current team: XDS Astana Team
- Discipline: Road
- Role: Rider

Amateur team
- 2021: UC Monaco

Professional teams
- 2021: Vino–Astana Motors (stagiaire)
- 2022–2023: Astana Qazaqstan Development Team
- 2024–: Astana Qazaqstan Team

Nicolas Vinokurov (Kazakh: Николас Винокуров; born 7 July 2002) is a Kazakh cyclist, who currently rides for UCI WorldTeam XDS Astana Team. He was born in Nice, France. His father Alexandre and twin brother also named Alexandre also have competed as professional cyclists.

== Major results ==
2019
2nd Road race, National Junior Road Championships
2022
National Under-23 Road Championships

1st Road race
3rd Time trial

Asian Under-23 Road Championships

3rd Road race
4th Time trial

2023
National Under-23 Road Championships

1st Road race
3rd Time trial

2nd Overall Tour of Van

1st Young rider classification

3rd Overall Tour of Istanbul
2024
Asian Under-23 Road Championships

1st Time trial
5th Road race

4th Overall Tour of Japan

1st Young rider classification
1st Stage 5

5th Time trial, National Road Championships
2025
4th Overall Tour de Langkawi

1st Young rider classification

2026
7th Overall AlUla Tour

=== Grand Tour general classification results timeline ===
Grand Tour	2024	2025
Giro d'Italia	—	—
Tour de France	—	—
Vuelta a España	128	105

Legend
—	Did not compete
DNF	Did not finish
