= 2025 Vuelta a España, Stage 12 to Stage 21 =

Vuelta a España stages (cycling)

The 2025 Vuelta a España was a three-week cycling race which took place in Italy, France, Andorra and Spain. It was the 80th edition of the Vuelta a España and the third and final grand tour of the 2025 men's road cycling season. It started on 23 August in Turin and finished on 14 September in Madrid.

== Classification standings ==
Legend
Denotes the leader of the general classification	Denotes the leader of the young rider classification
Denotes the leader of the points classification	Denotes the leader of the team classification
Denotes the leader of the mountains classification	Denotes the winner of the combativity award

== Stage 12 ==
4 September 2025 – Laredo to Los Corrales de Buelna, 144.9 km (90.0 mi)

After an eventful stage in Bilbao, the riders tackled a parcours that was tailor-made for a breakaway battle. There were two categorized climbs on the menu - the second-category Puerto de Alisas (8.6 km at 5.8%) and the first-category Collada de Brenes (7 km at 7.9%). The latter climb featured gradients of over 15% and topped with just 22.9 kilometres (14.2 mi) left on the stage.

It took more than 30 kilometres (19 mi) before a large group of riders went up the road. More riders gradually bridged to the front group before 53 riders emerged up front as the dust settled. With Bruno Armirail (Decathlon–AG2R La Mondiale), who was eight and a half minutes down on Jonas Vingegaard (Visma–Lease a Bike), being the only GC threat up front, the break was allowed to establish a lead enough to fight for the stage win. As the riders passed through the intermediate sprint with just over 40 kilometres (25 mi) to go, Mads Pedersen (Lidl–Trek) took maximum points to extend his advantage at the top of the points classification. Before the break reached the foot of Collada de Brenes, a group of six composed of Magnus Sheffield (Ineos Grenadiers), Michel Hessmann (Movistar Team), James Shaw (EF Education–EasyPost), Finlay Pickering (Team Bahrain Victorious), Brieuc Rolland (Groupama–FDJ), and Victor Guernalec (Arkéa–B&B Hotels) split off the front of the break. They built a gap of 40 seconds as they approached the foot of Collada de Brenes.

On the climb, Marc Soler (UAE Team Emirates XRG) set a hard pace in the chasing group, setting up an attack for his teammate, Juan Ayuso, which brought back the front group in the process. Ayuso was initially solo up front but Javier Romo (Movistar Team) soon caught up to him. The front duo hit the top of the climb with a lead of around 20 seconds on Rolland while the remnants of the break were almost 50 seconds behind. Ayuso and Romo managed to prevent Rolland from coming back, keeping him at just under 20 seconds back. In the sprint for the win, Ayuso held off Romo to win his second stage of the race. Rolland barely held off the rest of the chasing group to finish third. Pedersen finished fifth to further add to his lead in the points classification. The peloton rolled across the line at more than six minutes down. The only change at the top of the GC was Armirail jumping up to sixth after he finished with the main breakaway group.

Stage 12 Result
Rank	Rider	Team	Time
1	Juan Ayuso (ESP)	UAE Team Emirates XRG	3h 16' 21"
2	Javier Romo (ESP)	Movistar Team	+ 0"
3	Brieuc Rolland (FRA)	Groupama–FDJ	+ 13"
4	Victor Campenaerts (BEL)	Visma–Lease a Bike	+ 17"
5	Mads Pedersen (DEN)	Lidl–Trek	+ 17"
6	Nico Denz (GER)	Red Bull–Bora–Hansgrohe	+ 17"
7	Damien Howson (AUS)	Q36.5 Pro Cycling Team	+ 18"
8	Santiago Buitrago (COL)	Team Bahrain Victorious	+ 18"
9	Markel Beloki (ESP)	EF Education–EasyPost	+ 18"
10	Pablo Castrillo (ESP)	Movistar Team	+ 18"

General classification after Stage 12
Rank	Rider	Team	Time
1	Jonas Vingegaard (DEN)	Visma–Lease a Bike	44h 36' 45"
2	João Almeida (POR)	UAE Team Emirates XRG	+ 50"
3	Tom Pidcock (GBR)	Q36.5 Pro Cycling Team	+ 56"
4	Torstein Træen (NOR)	Team Bahrain Victorious	+ 1' 06"
5	Felix Gall (AUT)	Decathlon–AG2R La Mondiale	+ 2' 17"
6	Bruno Armirail (FRA)	Decathlon–AG2R La Mondiale	+ 2' 23"
7	Matteo Jorgenson (USA)	Visma–Lease a Bike	+ 2' 26"
8	Jai Hindley (AUS)	Red Bull–Bora–Hansgrohe	+ 2' 30"
9	Giulio Ciccone (ITA)	Lidl–Trek	+ 2' 33"
10	Giulio Pellizzari (ITA)	Red Bull–Bora–Hansgrohe	+ 2' 44"

== Stage 13 ==
5 September 2025 – Cabezón de la Sal to L'Angliru, 202.7 km (126.0 mi)

The race headed back to the mountains on the thirteenth stage with the riders tackling the famous climb of Alto de L’Angliru (12.4 km at 9.7%). The first 147.3 kilometres (91.5 mi) were mostly flat before the riders climbed up the first-category climbs of Alto La Mozqueta (6.3 km at 8.4%) and Alto del Cordal (5.5 km at 8.8%). Off the descent of Alto del Cordal, the riders immediately reached the foot of Alto de L’Angliru. The first 6 kilometres (3.7 mi) of the climb averaged around 7% before ramping up and averaging more than 13% for the next 6 kilometres (3.7 mi). The final few hundred meters of the stage was on a short descent to the line.

A few kilometres from the start of the stage, a group of 24 riders managed to escape from the peloton. There were no GC threats in the break as Gianmarco Garofoli (Soudal–Quick-Step) was the closest rider at more than 35 minutes down. Among those also involved in the break were Pedersen and Ethan Vernon (Israel–Premier Tech), the top two in the points classification who were aiming to get points at the intermediate sprint. Four chasers also tried to join the break but among those four, only Ivo Oliveira (UAE Team Emirates XRG) managed to bridge to the front. The 25-man group only got a gap of around three minutes as Visma–Lease a Bike was controlling for the stage. As the break made their way to the top of Alto La Mozqueta, only five riders remained up front - Jefferson Alveiro Cepeda (Movistar Team), Bob Jungels (Ineos Grenadiers), Antonio Tiberi (Team Bahrain Victorious), Nicolas Vinokurov (XDS Astana Team), and Garofoli. On the descent, Pedersen was able to catch back up to the front group. Shortly afterwards, Tiberi suffered a puncture, dropping him to the chase group at half a minute down.

At the intermediate sprint just before Alto del Cordal, Pedersen took maximum points, extending his lead to 81 points over Vernon. On the climb, Jungels, Cepeda, and Vinokourov pushed on from the front, extending their gap on the chase group. Tiberi tried to pursue the front trio but he was unable to do so, with his chase effectively ending when he crashed on the descent of the Cordal. At the bottom of the Angliru, the front group was blocked by protesters, costing them around half a minute. Behind them, UAE Team Emirates XRG lifted the pace from the Alto del Cordal, gradually closing the gap to the leaders. On the steep section of the Angliru, the red jersey group was down to just João Almeida (UAE Team Emirates XRG), Jai Hindley (Red Bull–Bora–Hansgrohe), Sepp Kuss (Visma–Lease a Bike), and Vingegaard, with Almeida doing the pacemaking. After catching the breakaway, Almeida kept pacing to the top, dropping Hindley and Kuss in the process. Vingegaard was unable to attack Almeida as the battle for the stage headed to a sprint. Almeida held off Vingegaard to win the stage, marking his team’s sixth win in this race. Hindley and Kuss finished around half a minute down while the rest of the contenders lost around one to two minutes.

In the GC, Vingegaard’s lead was reduced to 46 seconds on Almeida with the latter’s stage win. Tom Pidcock (Q36.5 Pro Cycling Team) kept third at more than two minutes down while Hindley moved up to fourth at exactly three minutes behind. Felix Gall (Decathlon–AG2R La Mondiale) is the only rider within four minutes of Vingegaard, sitting just 15 seconds behind Hindley.

Stage 13 Result
Rank	Rider	Team	Time
1	João Almeida (POR)	UAE Team Emirates XRG	4h 54' 15"
2	Jonas Vingegaard (DEN)	Visma–Lease a Bike	+ 0"
3	Jai Hindley (AUS)	Red Bull–Bora–Hansgrohe	+ 28"
4	Sepp Kuss (USA)	Visma–Lease a Bike	+ 30"
5	Felix Gall (AUT)	Decathlon–AG2R La Mondiale	+ 52"
6	Giulio Pellizzari (ITA)	Red Bull–Bora–Hansgrohe	+ 1' 11"
7	Tom Pidcock (GBR)	Q36.5 Pro Cycling Team	+ 1' 16"
8	Matthew Riccitello (USA)	Israel–Premier Tech	+ 1' 16"
9	Giulio Ciccone (ITA)	Lidl–Trek	+ 2' 15"
10	Abel Balderstone (ESP)	Caja Rural–Seguros RGA	+ 3' 06"

General classification after Stage 13
Rank	Rider	Team	Time
1	Jonas Vingegaard (DEN)	Visma–Lease a Bike	49h 30' 54"
2	João Almeida (POR)	UAE Team Emirates XRG	+ 46"
3	Tom Pidcock (GBR)	Q36.5 Pro Cycling Team	+ 2' 18"
4	Jai Hindley (AUS)	Red Bull–Bora–Hansgrohe	+ 3' 00"
5	Felix Gall (AUT)	Decathlon–AG2R La Mondiale	+ 3' 15"
6	Giulio Pellizzari (ITA)	Red Bull–Bora–Hansgrohe	+ 4' 01"
7	Matthew Riccitello (USA)	Israel–Premier Tech	+ 4' 33"
8	Giulio Ciccone (ITA)	Lidl–Trek	+ 4' 54"
9	Torstein Træen (NOR)	Team Bahrain Victorious	+ 5' 21"
10	Sepp Kuss (USA)	Visma–Lease a Bike	+ 5' 26"

== Stage 14 ==
6 September 2025 – Avilés to Alto de La Farrapona, 135.9 km (84.4 mi)

The riders tackled another summit finish on the fourteenth stage as the riders finished atop La Farrapona (16.9 km at 5.9%). After 63.7 kilometres (39.6 mi) of lumpy terrain, the riders climbed up the third-category L’Alto Tenebreo (5.8 km at 6.5%) and the first-category Puerto de San Lorenzo (10.1 km at 8.5%) as the precursors to the final climb. The climb to La Farrapona was irregular for the first 10 kilometres (6.2 mi) before averaging almost 9% in the final 6 kilometres (3.7 mi).

As soon as the flag dropped, multiple riders attempted to go into the break until a group of 22 riders eventually established the break of the day. Visma–Lease a Bike was content to give the break six minutes as the closest rider on GC in the break was Armirail at 12 minutes down. Two more riders eventually bridged to the front to make it a 24-rider break. On the Puerto de San Lorenzo, the break began to whittle down to just 11 riders while behind them, UAE Team Emirates XRG began to increase the pace in the peloton. Egan Bernal (Ineos Grenadiers) and Giulio Ciccone (Lidl–Trek) were dropped by the pace, causing them to lose more than 21 minutes at the end of the day. At the top of the climb, around less than 20 riders were left in the GC group while the break’s lead was down to three and a half minutes.

With 19 kilometres (12 mi) left, Marc Soler (UAE Team Emirates XRG) attacked from the break, bringing only Johannes Staune-Mittet (Decathlon–AG2R La Mondiale) with him. A few kilometres later, Soler put in a second acceleration, dropping Staune-Mittet and gradually extending his lead on the rest of the break. His lead over the peloton was still over three minutes at the foot of the final climb to La Farrapona. The peloton gradually closed in on Soler but he had more than enough time to hold on and win the stage, the team’s seventh victory in this Vuelta. In the peloton, UAE Team Emirates XRG continued to set the pace until Red Bull–Bora–Hansgrohe took over with Giulio Pellizzari. However, due to the headwind, there were no attacks until the final kilometre when Hindley made his move. Only Almeida and Vingegaard were able to follow his move. All the remaining members of the break apart from Soler were swallowed up, which meant that the bonus seconds for second and third were still in play. Vingegaard barely beat Almeida for second while Hindley was gapped by four seconds. The rest of the main GC contenders lost minimal time and only lost no more than 14 seconds. In the GC, Vingegaard extended his lead to 48 seconds over Almeida by virtue of the difference in bonus seconds between second and third on the stage. Hindley moved to within 32 seconds of Pidcock’s third place.

Stage 14 Result
Rank	Rider	Team	Time
1	Marc Soler (ESP)	UAE Team Emirates XRG	3h 48' 22"
2	Jonas Vingegaard (DEN)	Visma–Lease a Bike	+ 39"
3	João Almeida (POR)	UAE Team Emirates XRG	+ 39"
4	Jai Hindley (AUS)	Red Bull–Bora–Hansgrohe	+ 43"
5	Felix Gall (AUT)	Decathlon–AG2R La Mondiale	+ 48"
6	Giulio Pellizzari (ITA)	Red Bull–Bora–Hansgrohe	+ 53"
7	Matthew Riccitello (USA)	Israel–Premier Tech	+ 53"
8	Tom Pidcock (GBR)	Q36.5 Pro Cycling Team	+ 53"
9	Sepp Kuss (USA)	Visma–Lease a Bike	+ 53"
10	Finlay Pickering (GBR)	Team Bahrain Victorious	+ 1' 25"

General classification after Stage 14
Rank	Rider	Team	Time
1	Jonas Vingegaard (DEN)	Visma–Lease a Bike	53h 19' 49"
2	João Almeida (POR)	UAE Team Emirates XRG	+ 48"
3	Tom Pidcock (GBR)	Q36.5 Pro Cycling Team	+ 2' 38"
4	Jai Hindley (AUS)	Red Bull–Bora–Hansgrohe	+ 3' 10"
5	Felix Gall (AUT)	Decathlon–AG2R La Mondiale	+ 3' 30"
6	Giulio Pellizzari (ITA)	Red Bull–Bora–Hansgrohe	+ 4' 21"
7	Matthew Riccitello (USA)	Israel–Premier Tech	+ 4' 53"
8	Sepp Kuss (USA)	Visma–Lease a Bike	+ 5' 46"
9	Torstein Træen (NOR)	Team Bahrain Victorious	+ 6' 33"
10	Matteo Jorgenson (USA)	Visma–Lease a Bike	+ 8' 52"

== Stage 15 ==
7 September 2025 – Vegadeo to Monforte de Lemos, 167.8 km (104.3 mi)

The last stage before the second rest day featured a hilly parcours that was expected to suit the breakaway. The first 54.7 kilometres (34.0 mi) of the stage had two categorized climbs - the first-category Puerto A Garganta (16.5 km at 5.1%) and the second-category Alto de Barbeitos (11.9 km at 3.9%). After going over the top of the latter climb, the rest of the stage was quite lumpy but the finish in Monforte de Lemos was flat.

At the start of the stage, Jakub Otruba (Caja Rural–Seguros RGA) was initially alone at the front heading to the first climb, the Puerto A Garganta, but he was soon joined by Jay Vine (UAE Team Emirates XRG), who was aiming to get points for the mountains classification. After Vine took maximum points at the top of the climb, the break ballooned to 47 riders in front, including Pedersen and four of his teammates. As Junior Lecerf (Soudal–Quick-Step) was the closest GC threat in the break at over 18 minutes down, the peloton let the break go and allowed them to fight for the stage win. Before the break reached the top of the second climb, the Alto de Barbeitos, Vine and Louis Vervaeke (Soudal–Quick-Step) attacked with the former taking maximum points to further add to his lead in the mountains classification. The front duo gradually extended their lead to around three minutes over the rest of the break, which was being paced by Pedersen’s teammates.

At 56 kilometres (35 mi) from the finish, a protester interfered with the break, causing Romo to crash. Romo was eventually able to come back to the chase group. With around 30 kilometres (19 mi) to go, with the front group’s lead down to around a minute, a seven-man chase group composed of Magnus Sheffield (Ineos Grenadiers), Eddie Dunbar (Team Jayco–AlUla), Santiago Buitrago (Team Bahrain Victorious), Orluis Aular (Movistar Team), Marco Frigo (Israel–Premier Tech), Pedersen, and Bernal attacked from the original chase group. They gradually closed in on Vine and Vervaeke, catching them with 6.8 kilometres (4.2 mi) left. There were multiple attacks in the front group but the win came down to a group sprint. Inside the final kilometre, Sheffield went down on a corner before Frigo went on a flyer with 500 metres (1,600 ft) to go. Pedersen quickly went to his wheel, using Frigo as a leadout before launching his sprint. The Dane won the sprint over Aular, taking a total of 45 points to consolidate his lead in the points classification. The peloton rolled over across the line at more than 13 minutes down, which meant that Lecerf jumped up to ninth on GC.

Stage 15 Result
Rank	Rider	Team	Time
1	Mads Pedersen (DEN)	Lidl–Trek	4h 02' 13"
2	Orluis Aular (VEN)	Movistar Team	+ 0"
3	Marco Frigo (ITA)	Israel–Premier Tech	+ 0"
4	Santiago Buitrago (COL)	Team Bahrain Victorious	+ 0"
5	Eddie Dunbar (IRL)	Team Jayco–AlUla	+ 0"
6	Egan Bernal (COL)	Ineos Grenadiers	+ 0"
7	Louis Vervaeke (BEL)	Soudal–Quick-Step	+ 0"
8	Jay Vine (AUS)	UAE Team Emirates XRG	+ 8"
9	Magnus Sheffield (USA)	Ineos Grenadiers	+ 0"
10	Alec Segaert (BEL)	Lotto	+ 23"

General classification after Stage 15
Rank	Rider	Team	Time
1	Jonas Vingegaard (DEN)	Visma–Lease a Bike	57h 35' 33"
2	João Almeida (POR)	UAE Team Emirates XRG	+ 48"
3	Tom Pidcock (GBR)	Q36.5 Pro Cycling Team	+ 2' 38"
4	Jai Hindley (AUS)	Red Bull–Bora–Hansgrohe	+ 3' 10"
5	Felix Gall (AUT)	Decathlon–AG2R La Mondiale	+ 3' 30"
6	Giulio Pellizzari (ITA)	Red Bull–Bora–Hansgrohe	+ 4' 21"
7	Matthew Riccitello (USA)	Israel–Premier Tech	+ 4' 53"
8	Sepp Kuss (USA)	Visma–Lease a Bike	+ 5' 46"
9	Junior Lecerf (BEL)	Soudal–Quick-Step	+ 5' 49"
10	Torstein Træen (NOR)	Team Bahrain Victorious	+ 6' 33"

== Rest day 2 ==
8 September 2025 – Pontevedra

== Stage 16 ==
9 September 2025 – Poio to Mos (Castro de Herville), 167.9 km (104.3 mi)

Following the last race day, the sixteenth stage was a hilly stage that was expected to suit the breakaway again. The first 73.9 kilometres (45.9 mi) was ridden on rolling terrain before the riders climbed up four categorized climbs - the third-category Alto de San Antoñino (9 km at 4%), the first-category Alto de Groba (11.3 km at 5.4%), the second-category Alto de Prado (4.3 km at 8.9%), and the second-category climb to the finish in Castro de Herville (8.2 km at 5.2%). The final climb averaged more than 10% for the first 3 kilometres (1.9 mi) before easing to a short descent and averaging around 4.5% for the final 4 kilometres (2.5 mi).

It took more than 50 kilometres (31 mi) before a group of 17 riders went away from the peloton. Visma–Lease a Bike gave the break around four and a half minutes before the race reached the categorized climbs. On the Alto de Groba, Mikel Landa (Soudal–Quick-Step) attacked his breakaway companions. Bernal and Clément Braz Afonso (Groupama–FDJ) bridged up to him near the top while on the descent, Rolland and Nico Denz (Red Bull–Bora–Hansgrohe) joined the trio to make it five out front. At this point, the peloton allowed the break’s lead to go above six minutes. Several riders tried to bridge from the chase group to the front but no one was able to come close. On the slopes of Alto de Prado, Denz was dropped from the front before being joined by Soler and Pickering, forming the chase group. Rolland was also dropped near the top, leaving Bernal, Landa, and Braz Afonso out front.

As the front group approached the final climb, the Castro de Herville, Braz Afronso suffered a puncture with 16 kilometres (9.9 mi) left, leaving Bernal and Landa to fight it out for the stage. Shortly after, the race organizers announced that due to pro-Palestinian protests on the final climb, the finish line was moved to the 8-kilometre (5.0 mi) mark, leaving out the final climb. Near the revised finish line, Landa led out the sprint before Bernal moved past the Spaniard, winning his first Grand Tour stage since his career-threatening crash in 2022. In the peloton, Team Bahrain Victorious lifted the pace on Alto de Prado to protect Torstein Træen’s place on GC from Bernal. Gall struggled to follow the pace, eventually losing 54 seconds to the main favorites. At the top, Vingegaard suffered a puncture but he quickly came back to the peloton. Pidcock tried to form splits on the descent but all of the favorites, apart from Gall, finished together. With Gall’s time loss, Pellizzari moved above Gall on GC. Lecerf lost more than two minutes but he managed to cling to his tenth place.

Stage 16 Result
Rank	Rider	Team	Time
1	Egan Bernal (COL)	Ineos Grenadiers	3h 35' 10"
2	Mikel Landa (ESP)	Soudal–Quick-Step	+ 0"
3	Brieuc Rolland (FRA)	Groupama–FDJ	+ 7"
4	Nico Denz (GER)	Red Bull–Bora–Hansgrohe	+ 1' 02"
5	Clément Braz Afonso (FRA)	Groupama–FDJ	+ 1' 02"
6	Bob Jungels (LUX)	Ineos Grenadiers	+ 1' 10"
7	Kevin Vermaerke (USA)	Team Picnic–PostNL	+ 1' 12"
8	Finlay Pickering (GBR)	Team Bahrain Victorious	+ 1' 12"
9	Sean Quinn (USA)	EF Education–EasyPost	+ 2' 48"
10	Rudy Molard (FRA)	Groupama–FDJ	+ 2' 48"

General classification after Stage 16
Rank	Rider	Team	Time
1	Jonas Vingegaard (DEN)	Visma–Lease a Bike	61h 16' 35"
2	João Almeida (POR)	UAE Team Emirates XRG	+ 48"
3	Tom Pidcock (GBR)	Q36.5 Pro Cycling Team	+ 2' 38"
4	Jai Hindley (AUS)	Red Bull–Bora–Hansgrohe	+ 3' 10"
5	Giulio Pellizzari (ITA)	Red Bull–Bora–Hansgrohe	+ 4' 21"
6	Felix Gall (AUT)	Decathlon–AG2R La Mondiale	+ 4' 24"
7	Matthew Riccitello (USA)	Israel–Premier Tech	+ 4' 53"
8	Sepp Kuss (USA)	Visma–Lease a Bike	+ 5' 46"
9	Torstein Træen (NOR)	Team Bahrain Victorious	+ 6' 33"
10	Junior Lecerf (BEL)	Soudal–Quick-Step	+ 8' 04"

== Stage 17 ==
10 September 2025 – O Barco de Valdeorras to Ponferrada (Alto de El Morredero), 143.2 km (89.0 mi)

Stage seventeen featured the penultimate summit finish of the race with the riders finishing atop the first-category Alto de El Morredero (8.8 km at 9.7%). The first 134.4 kilometres (83.5 mi) had several lumps, including the third-category Paso de las Traviesas (7.8 km at 4.1%). Alto de El Morredero averaged more than 11.5% for the first 5 kilometres (3.1 mi) while the last 3.8 kilometres (2.4 mi) averaged around 7.5%.

After more than 20 kilometres (12 mi) of racing, a group of eight riders managed to get into the break. Among the riders in the break was Harold Tejada (XDS Astana Team), who was in eleventh overall at almost 12 minutes down. Four more riders were able to bridge to the break to make it 12 riders in front. They were only able to build their advantage to around two minutes as Visma–Lease a Bike were going for the stage with Vingegaard. The situation remained the same until Tiberi attacked from the break with 22 kilometres (14 mi) to go. Only Tejada was able to go with him while a chase group composed of Sergio Samitier (Cofidis), Gijs Leemreize (Team Picnic–PostNL), and Jonas Gregaard (Lotto) formed just close behind them; the trio would eventually join the two up front. Meanwhile, in the peloton, Red Bull–Bora–Hansgrohe began to set a furious pace ahead of the final climb, rapidly approaching the break as a result. The pace caused Lecerf and Gall to struggle even before they reached the foot of the categorized climb of Alto de El Morredero. With the break’s lead only around 20 seconds, Samitier attempted a flyer but the break was already swallowed with 12 kilometres (7.5 mi) to go.

On the steep portion of Alto de El Morredero, Ben Tulett (Visma–Lease a Bike) began to set the pace until Hindley attacked with 6.3 kilometres (3.9 mi) left. Vingegaard, Pidcock, and Matthew Riccitello (Israel–Premier Tech) were quickly on Hindley’s wheel while Almeida and Pellizzari gradually came back. As the double-digit gradients ended, Pellizzari launched two attacks, successfully getting a gap after the second attack. The five chasers marked each other as Pellizzari increased his lead to half a minute. The Italian held on until the finish, taking his first Grand Tour stage in the process. In the sprint for the remaining bonus seconds, Pidcock finished second and gained two seconds on Hindley while Vingegaard also gained two seconds on Almeida. Despite being dropped early, Gall only lost less than a minute with Træen finishing on the same time. In the GC, Vingegaard extended his lead to 50 seconds on Almeida while Pidcock extended his gap by four seconds on Hindley in the battle for third. Pellizzari increased his lead to more than a minute on Gall for fifth.

Stage 17 Result
Rank	Rider	Team	Time
1	Giulio Pellizzari (ITA)	Red Bull–Bora–Hansgrohe	3h 37' 00"
2	Tom Pidcock (GBR)	Q36.5 Pro Cycling Team	+ 16"
3	Jai Hindley (AUS)	Red Bull–Bora–Hansgrohe	+ 18"
4	Jonas Vingegaard (DEN)	Visma–Lease a Bike	+ 20"
5	João Almeida (POR)	UAE Team Emirates XRG	+ 22"
6	Matthew Riccitello (USA)	Israel–Premier Tech	+ 26"
7	Felix Gall (AUT)	Decathlon–AG2R La Mondiale	+ 53"
8	Torstein Træen (NOR)	Team Bahrain Victorious	+ 53"
9	Sepp Kuss (USA)	Visma–Lease a Bike	+ 58"
10	Matteo Jorgenson (USA)	Visma–Lease a Bike	+ 1' 44"

General classification after Stage 17
Rank	Rider	Team	Time
1	Jonas Vingegaard (DEN)	Visma–Lease a Bike	64h 53' 55"
2	João Almeida (POR)	UAE Team Emirates XRG	+ 50"
3	Tom Pidcock (GBR)	Q36.5 Pro Cycling Team	+ 2' 28"
4	Jai Hindley (AUS)	Red Bull–Bora–Hansgrohe	+ 3' 04"
5	Giulio Pellizzari (ITA)	Red Bull–Bora–Hansgrohe	+ 3' 51"
6	Felix Gall (AUT)	Decathlon–AG2R La Mondiale	+ 4' 57"
7	Matthew Riccitello (USA)	Israel–Premier Tech	+ 4' 59"
8	Sepp Kuss (USA)	Visma–Lease a Bike	+ 6' 24"
9	Torstein Træen (NOR)	Team Bahrain Victorious	+ 7' 06"
10	Matteo Jorgenson (USA)	Visma–Lease a Bike	+ 10' 16"

== Stage 18 ==
11 September 2025 – Valladolid to Valladolid, 12.2 km (7.6 mi) (ITT)

The eighteenth stage featured the only individual time trial of the race. Originally, the riders were set to ride 27.2 kilometres (16.9 mi) of mostly flat parcours in Valladolid with only a short climb in the first half of the stage. A day before the stage, due to the threat of protests and to ensure the safety of the riders, the race organizers decided to shorten the stage to 12.2 kilometres (7.6 mi). In the revised route, the intermediate time checks were set at the 4-kilometre (2.5 mi) and 8-kilometre (5.0 mi) marks.

The first rider to set the benchmark time was Daan Hoole (Lidl–Trek), the winner of an ITT in the 2025 Giro d'Italia. He set a time of 13’ 19” but his time was beaten shortly after by Filippo Ganna (Ineos Grenadiers), the big favorite for the stage. The Italian finished with a time of exactly 13 minutes, averaging more than 56 kilometres per hour. Several riders managed to beat Ganna’s time at both time checks but fell behind in the run-in to the finish. The only rider to come close to beating Ganna was Vine. The Australian was nine seconds up on Ganna by the second time check but he fell short of winning the stage by less than a second. No one else came close as Ganna held on to the stage win.

The focus soon shifted to the battle between the GC contenders. Pellizzari, Gall, and Riccitello were only separated by just over a minute for the fifth place on GC. Among the three, Riccitello set the best time of 13’ 36”, five seconds faster than Gall and ten seconds faster than Pellizzari. Riccitello’s time was enough to move him above Gall for sixth on GC with Pellizzari still holding on to fifth by 58 seconds. In the battle for the final podium place, Pidcock led Hindley by 36 seconds. Pidcock gained three seconds on Hindley to extend his lead to 39 seconds. The final two riders on the course were Vingegaard and Almeida, who were separated by 50 seconds on GC. Almeida finished with a time of 13’ 08”, which was good enough for third on the stage. Vingegaard lost ten seconds to Almeida, which meant that his lead was reduced to 40 seconds with one final mountain stage coming on stage 20.

Stage 18 Result
Rank	Rider	Team	Time
1	Filippo Ganna (ITA)	Ineos Grenadiers	13' 00"
2	Jay Vine (AUS)	UAE Team Emirates XRG	+ 1"
3	João Almeida (POR)	UAE Team Emirates XRG	+ 8"
4	Bruno Armirail (FRA)	Decathlon–AG2R La Mondiale	+ 10"
5	Ivo Oliveira (POR)	UAE Team Emirates XRG	+ 11"
6	Stefan Küng (SUI)	Groupama–FDJ	+ 12"
7	Kelland O'Brien (AUS)	Team Jayco–AlUla	+ 15"
8	Alec Segaert (BEL)	Lotto	+ 16"
9	Jonas Vingegaard (DEN)	Visma–Lease a Bike	+ 18"
10	Daan Hoole (NED)	Lidl–Trek	+ 19"

General classification after Stage 18
Rank	Rider	Team	Time
1	Jonas Vingegaard (DEN)	Visma–Lease a Bike	65h 07' 13"
2	João Almeida (POR)	UAE Team Emirates XRG	+ 40"
3	Tom Pidcock (GBR)	Q36.5 Pro Cycling Team	+ 2' 39"
4	Jai Hindley (AUS)	Red Bull–Bora–Hansgrohe	+ 3' 18"
5	Giulio Pellizzari (ITA)	Red Bull–Bora–Hansgrohe	+ 4' 19"
6	Matthew Riccitello (USA)	Israel–Premier Tech	+ 5' 17"
7	Felix Gall (AUT)	Decathlon–AG2R La Mondiale	+ 5' 20"
8	Sepp Kuss (USA)	Visma–Lease a Bike	+ 7' 26"
9	Torstein Træen (NOR)	Team Bahrain Victorious	+ 7' 42"
10	Matteo Jorgenson (USA)	Visma–Lease a Bike	+ 10' 19"

== Stage 19 ==
12 September 2025 – Rueda to Guijuelo, 161.9 km (100.6 mi)

Stage nineteen was a transition stage from Rueda to Guijuelo that was expected to suit the sprinters. There were no categorized climbs on the route but the terrain was undulating for most of the stage. The intermediate sprint with 58.9 kilometres (36.6 mi) left offered bonus seconds to the first three riders across. The final 2.3 kilometres (1.4 mi) averaged around 3%.

As soon as the stage started, Otruba and Guernalec immediately got a gap and established the break of the day. After around 18 kilometres (11 mi) of racing, Guernalec dropped out of the break, leaving Otruba in front. The lone breakaway rider had a lead of as much as four minutes before gradually being reeled in by the peloton. At the intermediate sprint, with four bonus seconds still available for the peloton, Visma–Lease a Bike managed to deliver Vingegaard to the front, adding four seconds to his lead as UAE Team Emirates XRG were caught asleep. After Otruba was caught, more riders, including Vingegaard, tried to form counterattacks but the stage was decided by the expected bunch sprint. In the final kilometre, Alpecin–Deceuninck delivered a perfect leadout for Jasper Philipsen, who comfortably won the sprint ahead of Pedersen and Aular to take his third stage of the race. Apart from the four bonus seconds gained by Vingegaard, there were no other changes at the top of the GC.

Stage 19 Result
Rank	Rider	Team	Time
1	Jasper Philipsen (BEL)	Alpecin–Deceuninck	3h 50' 35"
2	Mads Pedersen (DEN)	Lidl–Trek	+ 0"
3	Orluis Aular (VEN)	Movistar Team	+ 0"
4	Jenthe Biermans (BEL)	Arkéa–B&B Hotels	+ 0"
5	Ben Turner (GBR)	Ineos Grenadiers	+ 0"
6	Arne Marit (BEL)	Intermarché–Wanty	+ 0"
7	Fabio Christen (SUI)	Q36.5 Pro Cycling Team	+ 0"
8	Ethan Vernon (GBR)	Israel–Premier Tech	+ 0"
9	Thibaud Gruel (FRA)	Groupama–FDJ	+ 0"
10	Jordan Labrosse (FRA)	Decathlon–AG2R La Mondiale	+ 0"

General classification after Stage 19
Rank	Rider	Team	Time
1	Jonas Vingegaard (DEN)	Visma–Lease a Bike	68h 77' 44"
2	João Almeida (POR)	UAE Team Emirates XRG	+ 44"
3	Tom Pidcock (GBR)	Q36.5 Pro Cycling Team	+ 2' 43"
4	Jai Hindley (AUS)	Red Bull–Bora–Hansgrohe	+ 3' 22"
5	Giulio Pellizzari (ITA)	Red Bull–Bora–Hansgrohe	+ 4' 23"
6	Matthew Riccitello (USA)	Israel–Premier Tech	+ 5' 21"
7	Felix Gall (AUT)	Decathlon–AG2R La Mondiale	+ 5' 24"
8	Sepp Kuss (USA)	Visma–Lease a Bike	+ 7' 30"
9	Torstein Træen (NOR)	Team Bahrain Victorious	+ 7' 46"
10	Matteo Jorgenson (USA)	Visma–Lease a Bike	+ 10' 21"

== Stage 20 ==
13 September 2025 – Robledo de Chavela to Bola del Mundo, 165.6 km (102.9 mi)

The penultimate stage of the race featured the last mountain stage and the last opportunity for the GC contenders to take time on their rivals. After just a few kilometres of racing, the riders tackled the third-category climbs of Alto de La Escondida (9 km at 4.1%) and Puerto de La Paradilla (5.8 km at 5.4%) in succession. The second-category Alto del León (7 km at 7.3%) and the first-category Puerto de Navacerrada (6.9 km at 7.6%) were also climbed before the riders made their way to a summit finish atop the special category Bola del Mundo. The riders ascended the side of Puerto de Navacerrada they originally descended from before turning right to ascend the Bola del Mundo. The 12.3-kilometre (7.6 mi) climb averaged 8.6% as a whole but the final 3 kilometres (1.9 mi) averaged over 12%.

As the riders tackled the first two climbs, a group of 37 riders were able to get away from the peloton. Even without any GC threat in the break, UAE Team Emirates XRG and Red Bull–Bora–Hansgrohe kept their advantage under two minutes with the latter doing most of the pacemaking. On the first time up Puerto de Navacerrada, the break broke apart until only Bernal, Ciccone, Landa, Armirail, and Jardi van der Lee (EF Education–EasyPost) were left in front with a lead of a minute over the peloton. In the valley before climbing the Puerto de Navacerrada for a second time, a group of protesters blocked the road but the riders had space to swerve around them. Soon, the front group began attacking each other. Eventually, Landa was able to get a gap over his breakaway companions ahead of the final climb. In the peloton, UAE Team Emirates XRG gradually reduced the group to around 30 riders on the first ascent of Puerto de Navacerrada. They entered the final climb with still a deficit of a minute to Landa.

At the foot of Puerto de Navacerrada, Landa was caught and passed by Ciccone. Landa gradually came back to Ciccone’s wheel but both riders were gradually being reeled in by the peloton. With just under 7 kilometres (4.3 mi) left, Pellizzari and Gall began to struggle. The front duo were caught just as the peloton turned right to climb the Bola del Mundo. Almeida immediately lifted the pace but he was not able to drop Vingegaard, Pidcock, Hindley, Riccitello, and Kuss. Hindley soon tried to attack to potentially take the 39 seconds he needed to overtake Pidcock for the final podium place but Pidcock was able to follow. Just before the final kilometre, Vingegaard launched his attack, dropping the rest of the GC contenders. He ended up winning his third stage by 11 seconds over his teammate, Kuss, to solidify his red jersey with a flat stage to Madrid remaining. Hindley, Pidcock, Almeida, and Riccitello lost under half a minute and were separated by only 11 seconds. Vine finished just 47 seconds down, sealing the blue polka-dot jersey provided he finished the race the next day. Gall finished more than two minutes behind Vingegaard while Pelizzari lost almost three minutes.

In the GC, Vingegaard extended his lead to more than a minute over Almeida while Pidcock sealed his podium place after Hindley only took nine seconds, including the bonuses. Riccitello entered the top five with Pellizzari’s time loss and he also took over the lead in the young rider classification. Kuss overtook Gall for seventh place.

Stage 20 Result
Rank	Rider	Team	Time
1	Jonas Vingegaard (DEN)	Visma–Lease a Bike	3h 56' 23"
2	Sepp Kuss (USA)	Visma–Lease a Bike	+ 11"
3	Jai Hindley (AUS)	Red Bull–Bora–Hansgrohe	+ 13"
4	Tom Pidcock (GBR)	Q36.5 Pro Cycling Team	+ 18"
5	João Almeida (POR)	UAE Team Emirates XRG	+ 22"
6	Matthew Riccitello (USA)	Israel–Premier Tech	+ 24"
7	Jay Vine (AUS)	UAE Team Emirates XRG	+ 47"
8	Giulio Ciccone (ITA)	Lidl–Trek	+ 1' 11"
9	Junior Lecerf (BEL)	Soudal–Quick-Step	+ 1' 22"
10	Finlay Pickering (GBR)	Team Bahrain Victorious	+ 1' 30"

General classification after Stage 20
Rank	Rider	Team	Time
1	Jonas Vingegaard (DEN)	Visma–Lease a Bike	72h 53' 57"
2	João Almeida (POR)	UAE Team Emirates XRG	+ 1' 16"
3	Tom Pidcock (GBR)	Q36.5 Pro Cycling Team	+ 3' 11"
4	Jai Hindley (AUS)	Red Bull–Bora–Hansgrohe	+ 3' 41"
5	Matthew Riccitello (USA)	Israel–Premier Tech	+ 5' 55"
6	Giulio Pellizzari (ITA)	Red Bull–Bora–Hansgrohe	+ 7' 23"
7	Sepp Kuss (USA)	Visma–Lease a Bike	+ 7' 45"
8	Felix Gall (AUT)	Decathlon–AG2R La Mondiale	+ 7' 50"
9	Torstein Træen (NOR)	Team Bahrain Victorious	+ 9' 48"
10	Matteo Jorgenson (USA)	Visma–Lease a Bike	+ 12' 16"

== Stage 21 ==
14 September 2025 – Valdeolmos-Alalpardo to Madrid, 103.6 km (64.4 mi)

The final stage of the Vuelta featured the traditional flat stage from Alalpardo to the city of Madrid, but demonstrations against the genocide in Gaza and the participation of the Israel–Premier Tech team in the Vuelta had been called for that day along the route. The previous day, the race organizers announced that the stage was shortened by 8 kilometres (5.0 mi) due to the threat of protests. On the day of Stage 21, prior to the start, Prime Minister Pedro Sánchez had expressed his admiration for pro-Palestinian protestors, while the President of the Community of Madrid, Isabel Díaz Ayuso, of the conservative People's Party, showed her support to the Israel–Premier Tech team by visiting the team, shaking hands and taking pictures with them. The riders passed through the finish line in Madrid for the first time after 59.5 kilometres (37.0 mi). Afterwards, the riders tackled nine laps of a circuit around the city of Madrid. There were no categorized climbs on the route.

The first part of the stage featured the ceremonial procession before reaching Madrid where some of the riders posed for pictures at the front of the race, particularly the teams of the jersey winners and the GC podium finishers. However, approximately 100,000 demonstrators protesting against Israel's intervention in Gaza had gathered in Madrid along route, in what was described as a "festive atmosphere" with isolated incidents. However, before the riders reached the finish line in Madrid, at around 18:00, anti-genocide protesters invaded the road at several points of the final circuit, prompting the police to respond with tear gas, rubber bullets and charging against the demonstrators. The riders were ordered to stop and, at 18:30, the race organizers cancelled the stage altogether. The police charges and teargas continued after the cancellation of the stage, injuring one journalist and detaining two demonstrators. The Delegate of the Spanish Government to the Community of Madrid, Francisco Martín, later thanked the police for their "fantastic work". The podium ceremony was also cancelled. Vingegaard expressed his disappointment at the cancellation, stating "I was looking forward to celebrating this overall win with my team and the fans. Everyone has the right to protest, but not in a way that influences or endangers our race".

After the stage, reactions to the day's events were mostly along political lines. The conservative Mayor of Madrid José Luis Martínez-Almeida blamed Sánchez for the abandonment of the stage and concluded: "They have managed to ruin the final stage of the Vuelta and give a shameful image of our country." Isabel Díaz Ayuso also accused Sánchez of "being the only one happy with what happened". Israel's Minister of Foreign Affairs, Gideon Sa'ar, blamed the Spanish Government of "inciting" the protests.

Left-wing parties in Spain celebrated the outcome of the race. Prime Minister Sánchez expressed his "deep admiration" for the pro-Palestinian protests, and stated that "sports organisations need to ask themselves whether it’s ethical for Israel to keep taking part in international competitions". The Second Deputy Prime Minister of Spain of the Communist Party of Spain, Yolanda Díaz, stated that "Spanish society does not tolerate the normalization of the genocide in Gaza at sporting and cultural events. Israel cannot participate in any event. We fully support the mobilizations for the Palestinian people during the cycling tour. Our citizens are an example of dignity". The Member of the European Parliament of Podemos, Irene Montero, took to social media to respond to Ayuso's visit to the team: "The social mobilization against genocide is doing what the government should have done. The Vuelta has stopped! The people of Madrid have responded to Ayuso, who today lent her hand to the genocidaires' team."

Final general classification
Rank	Rider	Team	Time
1	Jonas Vingegaard (DEN)	Visma–Lease a Bike	74h 20' 28"
2	João Almeida (POR)	UAE Team Emirates XRG	+ 1' 16"
3	Tom Pidcock (GBR)	Q36.5 Pro Cycling Team	+ 3' 11"
4	Jai Hindley (AUS)	Red Bull–Bora–Hansgrohe	+ 3' 41"
5	Matthew Riccitello (USA)	Israel–Premier Tech	+ 5' 55"
6	Giulio Pellizzari (ITA)	Red Bull–Bora–Hansgrohe	+ 7' 23"
7	Sepp Kuss (USA)	Visma–Lease a Bike	+ 7' 45"
8	Felix Gall (AUT)	Decathlon–AG2R La Mondiale	+ 7' 50"
9	Torstein Træen (NOR)	Team Bahrain Victorious	+ 9' 48"
10	Matteo Jorgenson (USA)	Visma–Lease a Bike	+ 12' 16"
