= 2025 Vuelta a España =

80th edition of the Vuelta a España

2025 UCI World Tour, race 31 of 36
- Route of the 2025 Vuelta a España

Race details
- Dates: 23 August – 14 September
- Stages: 21
- Distance: 3,166.8 km (1,967.8 mi)
- Winning time: 74h 20' 28"

Results
Jersey awarded to the overall winner	Winner	Jonas Vingegaard (DEN)	(Visma–Lease a Bike)
	Second	João Almeida (POR)	(UAE Team Emirates XRG)
	Third	Tom Pidcock (GBR)	(Q36.5 Pro Cycling Team)
Jersey awarded to the points classification winner	Points	Mads Pedersen (DEN)	(Lidl–Trek)
Jersey awarded to the mountains classification winner	Mountains	Jay Vine (AUS)	(UAE Team Emirates XRG)
Jersey awarded to the young rider classification winner	Young rider	Matthew Riccitello (USA)	(Israel–Premier Tech)
Jersey awarded to the combativity classification winner	Combativity	Joel Nicolau (ESP)	(Caja Rural–Seguros RGA)
Jersey awarded to the team classification winner	Team	(United Arab Emirates) UAE Team Emirates XRG	

The 2025 Vuelta a España was a three-week cycling race that took place in Italy, France, Andorra and Spain. It started on 23 August in Turin, and finished on 14 September in Madrid. It was the 80th edition of the Vuelta a España and the third and final grand tour of the 2025 men's road cycling season. The race was organised by Unipublic, a subsidiary of Amaury Sport Organisation (ASO).

The race was won by Jonas Vingegaard of Visma–Lease a Bike, taking the first Vuelta in his career. Vingegaard won stages two and nine to initially build his advantage over his rivals. However, he got sick during the second week and he had to defend his lead before sealing the race on the penultimate stage to Bola del Mundo, where he won his third stage. Second place went to João Almeida of UAE Team Emirates XRG, finishing more than a minute behind Vingegaard. He consistently challenged Vingegaard in the mountains, winning the stage to Alto de L’Angliru in the process, but he was only able to take time through time bonuses and the time trials. The last step on the podium went to Tom Pidcock of Q36.5 Pro Cycling Team, taking his first podium finish on a Grand Tour. He performed consistently in the mountains and held off the challenge from Jai Hindley in the final two weeks.

The points classification was won by Mads Pedersen of Lidl–Trek. He had several high placings during the sprint stages and the intermediate sprints while also winning a breakaway stage in the second week. Jay Vine of UAE Team Emirates XRG won the mountains classification. He took the jersey after winning the first mountain stage on stage six and he held on to the jersey until the end of the race. The young rider classification went to Matthew Riccitello of Israel–Premier Tech. He was in a battle for the jersey with Giulio Pellizzari for most of the race before the American took the jersey on the penultimate stage. UAE Team Emirates XRG took the team classification while Joel Nicolau of Caja Rural–Seguros RGA was named the race’s most combative rider.

Several stages of the race were affected by pro-Palestinian protests regarding the Gaza war, and the inclusion of Israel–Premier Tech team, with multiple stages finishing prematurely, two without a stage winner. The final stage to Madrid, in particular, was cancelled upon reaching the circuit after several protesters invaded the road and knocked down the barriers. The final podium ceremony was also cancelled as a result. Prime Minister Pedro Sánchez expressed his "deep admiration" for pro-Palestinian protestors, with Mayor of Madrid José Luis Martínez-Almeida blaming Sánchez for the abandonment of the final stage. Israel's Minister of Foreign Affairs, Gideon Sa'ar, blamed the Spanish Government for "inciting" the protests.

== Teams ==
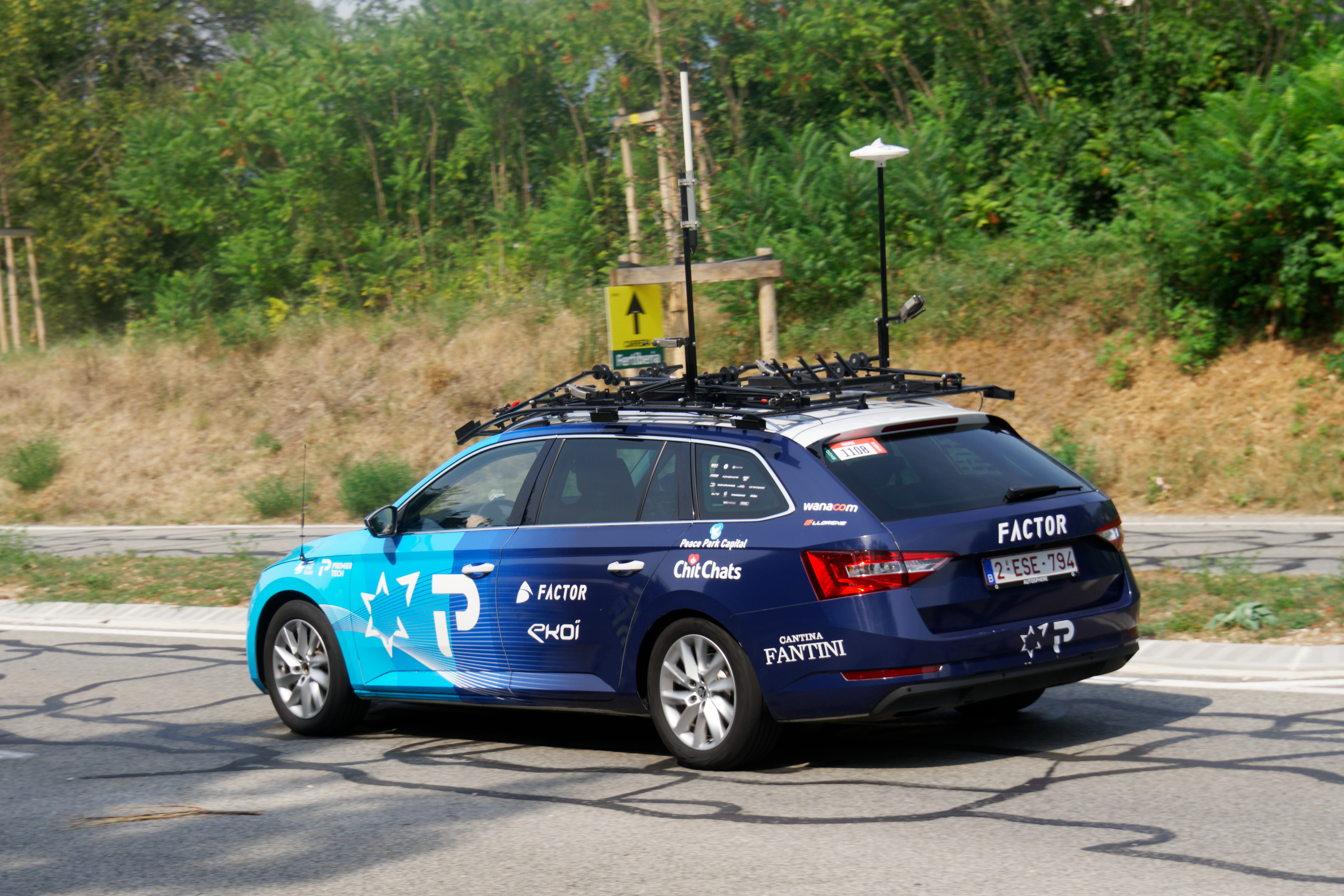
The inclusion of Israel–Premier Tech team in the race was met with protests

Twenty-three teams participated in the race. All 18 UCI WorldTeams were automatically invited. They were joined by five UCI ProTeams: the two highest ranked UCI ProTeams in 2024 (Lotto and Israel–Premier Tech), along with three teams selected by Unipublic, the organisers of the Tour.

Union Cycliste Internationale (UCI) rules allow 22 teams to enter a Grand Tour – 18 UCI WorldTeams, the two highest-ranked UCI ProTeams from the previous season and two teams invited by the organisers. Grand Tour race organisers ASO and RCS Sport asked the UCI to allow an additional wildcard team to be invited to Grand Tour events, after lobbying from smaller teams competing for the wildcard slots. Larger teams were reported to not support the request. In March 2025, the UCI announced that 23 teams would be permitted in 2025, allowing an additional team to be invited.

Civil society and human rights organizations such as the Plataforma para el Boicot Deportivo a Israel (PBD), the Boycott, Divestment and Sanctions (BDS) movement, the Red Solidaria contra la Ocupación de Palestina (RESCOP), Yala Nafarroa, and Villena por la Paz called for the exclusion of Israel–Premier Tech from the 2025 Vuelta under the slogan "Sport without genocide" and called for demonstrations. Political organizations also called for the exclusion of the team. On 25 August, the Spanish Izquierda Unida political party reiterated calls for the Spanish Government to exclude the team due to the International Court of Justice provisional measures based on the Convention on the Prevention and Punishment of the Crime of Genocide in the Gaza Strip (South Africa v. Israel) and called for an investigation into agreements and the use of public funds in relation with Israel–Premier Tech as a "sports washing tool for Genocide". In Navarre, the Contigo-Zurekin regional political coalition requested at the Navarre Parliament that Israel–Premier Tech be excluded from participating in Stage 10 of the Vuelta, which passed through Navarre. During the race, Foreign Minister José Manuel Albares and Minister of Sport Pilar Alegría both called for Israel–Premier Tech to withdraw from the race.

La Vuelta director Javier Guillén responded on 20 August stating that the organizers "were aware of the controversy surrounding the Israeli team [...], but we can't expel it from La Vuelta. It's impossible, and it's in the race by its own right. It has every right to participate, and we have every right to host it. [...] We're not unaware of what's happening, but we have nothing to say to any peaceful demonstration; protesting is a constitutional right." Cycling News reported that race organisers Unipublic tried to convince Israel–Premier Tech to withdraw from the race, however team owner Sylvan Adams declined. UCI rules obligated Israel–Premier Tech to be invited to the race, and organisers could not unilaterally exclude the team from the event.

From stage fourteen onwards, Israel–Premier Tech riders wore modified jerseys without the name of the team, with the team noting that their "name remains Israel–Premier Tech".

UCI WorldTeams

- Alpecin–Deceuninck
- Arkéa–B&B Hotels
- Cofidis
- Decathlon–AG2R La Mondiale
- EF Education–EasyPost
- Groupama–FDJ
- INEOS Grenadiers
- Intermarché–Wanty
- Lidl–Trek
- Movistar Team
- Red Bull–Bora–Hansgrohe
- Soudal–Quick-Step
- Team Bahrain Victorious
- Team Jayco–AlUla
- Team Picnic–PostNL
- UAE Team Emirates XRG
- Visma–Lease a Bike
- XDS Astana Team

UCI ProTeams

- Burgos Burpellet BH
- Caja Rural–Seguros RGA
- Israel–Premier Tech
- Lotto
- Q36.5 Pro Cycling Team

== Pre-race favourites ==
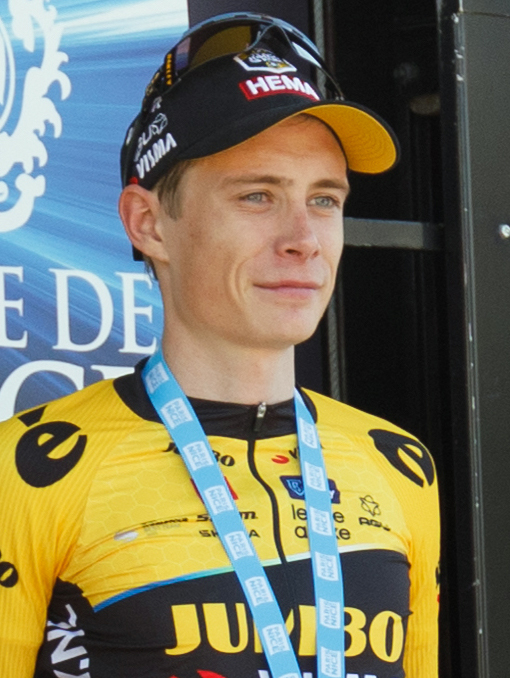
Jonas Vingegaard was considered favourite for the general classification

Jonas Vingegaard of Visma–Lease a Bike was considered the clear favourite, having finished second in the 2025 Tour de France. The Visma team was widely believed to be the strongest in the race and promised to offer the best support for Vingegaard, both in the mountain stages and on flat terrain. The team included 2024 and 2025 Paris-Nice champion Matteo Jorgenson, 2023 Vuelta champion Sepp Kuss, 2023 Tour of Norway champion Ben Tulett, and the experienced veteran Wilco Kelderman for climbing support. Support on the flat stages (including the team time trial) was to be provided primarily by 2022 Paris–Roubaix champion Dylan van Baarle and double European time trial champion and Tour de France stage winner Victor Campenaerts.

UAE Team Emirates XRG also had two strong contenders with Juan Ayuso and João Almeida. Alongside the two leaders, UAE fielded several accomplished support riders. Marc Soler, a multiple Vuelta stage winner, and Jay Vine, the 2023 Tour Down Under champion, were expected to play key roles in the high mountains. Domen Novak and Felix Großschartner added further depth to the climbing squad. Mikkel Bjerg and Ivo Oliveira, both strong time trial specialists, were selected to reinforce the team in the team time trial and on flat terrain.

Felix Gall of Decathlon–AG2R La Mondiale, who finished fifth at the 2025 Tour de France, was also one of the favourites for a podium finish. Ben O'Connor, who finished second in the 2024 Vuelta following a breakway performance on stage 6, was also competing at the race for Team Jayco–AlUla.

In the other classifications, the favourite for the green jersey for most points was Mads Pedersen of Team Lidl–Trek. His main competitor on flat sprint stages was multiple Tour de France stage winner Jasper Philipsen. Ben Turner of Ineos Grenadiers also posed a threat following a stage win and points classification victory a few weeks before the Vuelta at the Tour of Poland. Other notable sprinters included Casper van Uden, Jake Stewart, Ethan Vernon, Orluis Aular, and Bryan Coquard. For the young riders' classification, Giulio Pellizzari represented a strong challenger after a 6th place finish at the 2025 Giro.

== Route and stages ==
In December 2024, it was announced that the race would start in Turin, Italy – becoming the second city (after Utrecht in the Netherlands) to host the start of all three Grand Tours. The race visited four countries (Italy, France, Andorra and Spain), with 10 summit finishes (including the L'Angliru) and just 36 km (22 mi) of individual and team time trials.

Stage characteristics and winners
Stage	Date	Course	Distance	Type	Winner
1	23 August	Turin (Reggia di Venaria) (Italy) to Novara (Italy)	186.1 km (115.6 mi)	Flat stage	Jasper Philipsen (BEL)
2	24 August	Alba (Italy) to Limone Piemonte (Italy)	159.6 km (99.2 mi)	Flat stage	Jonas Vingegaard (DEN)
3	25 August	San Maurizio Canavese (Italy) to Ceres (Italy)	134.6 km (83.6 mi)	Medium-mountain stage	David Gaudu (FRA)
4	26 August	Susa (Italy) to Voiron (France)	206.7 km (128.4 mi)	Medium-mountain stage	Ben Turner (GBR)
5	27 August	Figueres to Figueres	24.1 km (15.0 mi)	Team time trial	UAE Team Emirates XRG (UAE)
6	28 August	Olot to Pal (Andorra)	170.3 km (105.8 mi)	Mountain stage	Jay Vine (AUS)
7	29 August	Andorra la Vella (Andorra) to Cerler (Huesca La Magia)	188 km (117 mi)	Mountain stage	Juan Ayuso (ESP)
8	30 August	Monzón (Templario) to Zaragoza	163.5 km (101.6 mi)	Flat stage	Jasper Philipsen (BEL)
9	31 August	Alfaro to Valdezcaray	195.5 km (121.5 mi)	Hilly stage	Jonas Vingegaard (DEN)
	1 September	Pamplona	Rest day		
10	2 September	Arguedas to El Ferial Larra Belagua	175.3 km (108.9 mi)	Flat stage	Jay Vine (AUS)
11	3 September	Bilbao to Bilbao	157.4 km (97.8 mi)	Medium-mountain stage	No winner declared (Note: No winner was named for stage 11 as the stage was shortened due to pro-Palestinian protests.)
12	4 September	Laredo to Los Corrales de Buelna	144.9 km (90.0 mi)	Medium-mountain stage	Juan Ayuso (ESP)
13	5 September	Cabezón de la Sal to L'Angliru	202.7 km (126.0 mi)	Mountain stage	João Almeida (POR)
14	6 September	Avilés to Alto de La Farrapona	135.9 km (84.4 mi)	Mountain stage	Marc Soler (ESP)
15	7 September	Vegadeo to Monforte de Lemos	167.8 km (104.3 mi)	Medium-mountain stage	Mads Pedersen (DEN)
	8 September	Pontevedra	Rest day		
16	9 September	Poio to Mos (Castro de Herville)	167.9 km (104.3 mi)	Medium-mountain stage	Egan Bernal (COL)
17	10 September	O Barco de Valdeorras to Ponferrada (Alto de El Morredero)	143.2 km (89.0 mi)	Medium-mountain stage	Giulio Pellizzari (ITA)
18	11 September	Valladolid to Valladolid	12.2 km (7.6 mi)	Individual time trial	Filippo Ganna (ITA)
19	12 September	Rueda to Guijuelo	161.9 km (100.6 mi)	Flat stage	Jasper Philipsen (BEL)
20	13 September	Robledo de Chavela to Bola del Mundo	165.6 km (102.9 mi)	Mountain stage	Jonas Vingegaard (DEN)
21	14 September	Valdeolmos-Alalpardo to Madrid	103.6 km (64.4 mi)	Flat stage	No winner declared (Note: No winner was declared for stage 21 as pro-Palestinian protestors blocked the race route.)
Total			3,166.8 km (1,967.8 mi)		

== Race overview ==
=== Week one ===
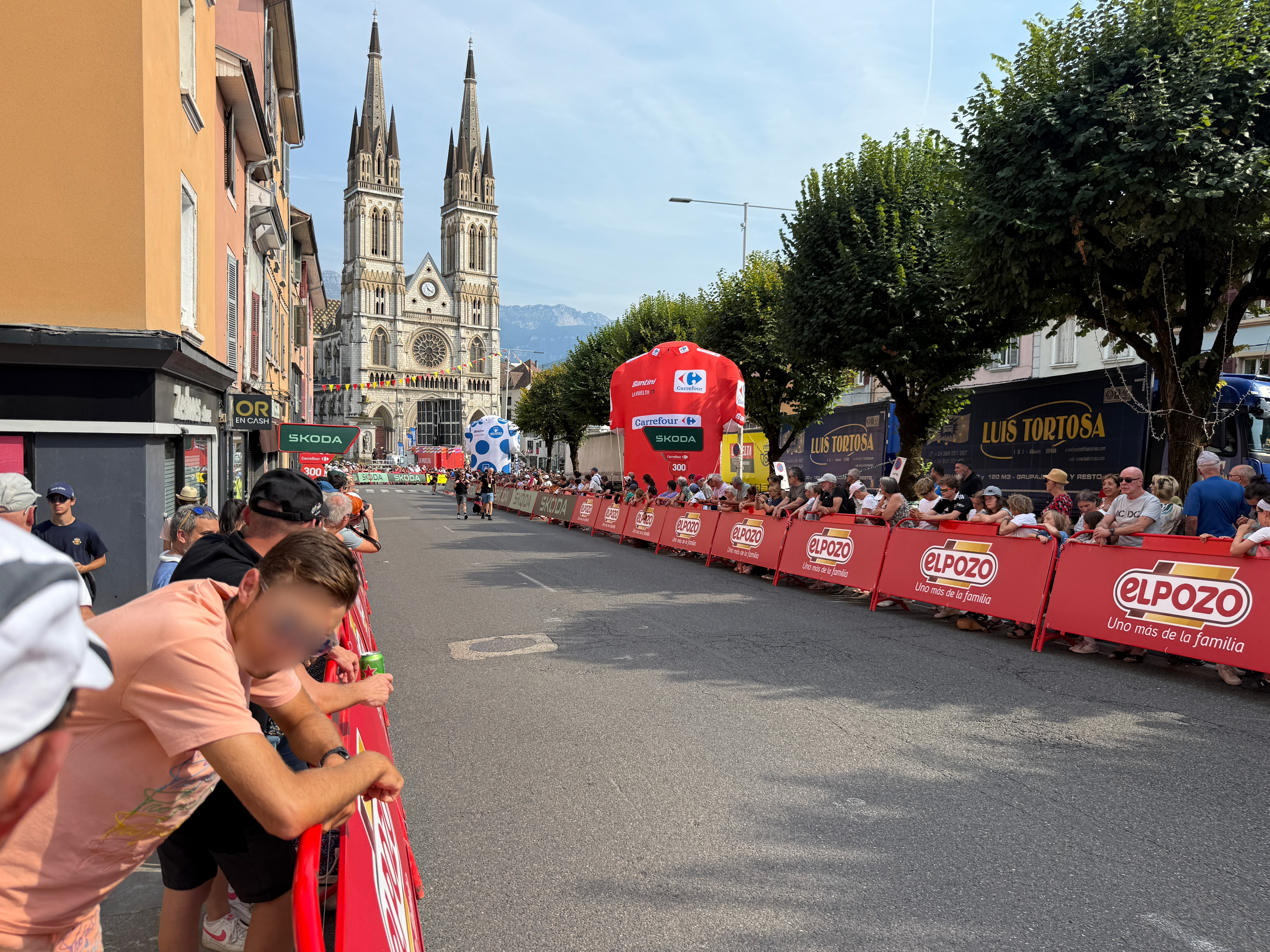
The first three stages took place in Italy, with stage 4 finishing in Voiron, France

The first three stages of the race took place in Italy. The first stage of the race featured a flat stage that offered the sprinters an opportunity to take the first red leader's jersey. After the six-man break was caught, the race headed to the inevitable bunch sprint where Jasper Philipsen (Alpecin–Deceuninck) won ahead of Ethan Vernon (Israel–Premier Tech) and Orluis Aular (Movistar Team), taking the first red jersey in the process. Stage two finished atop the second-category climb to Limone Piemonte (9.8 km at 5.1%). Before the final climb, there was a crash that involved several riders, including Jonas Vingegaard (Visma–Lease a Bike). All riders involved safely finished the stage. The win was decided by a reduced bunch sprint, where Vingegaard emerged victorious in a photo finish against Giulio Ciccone (Lidl–Trek). The Dane subsequently took the red jersey.

The third stage finished on a small uphill finish in Ceres, with the last 2.2 kilometres (1.4 mi) averaging 4.2%. Inside the final kilometre, Ciccone led out Mads Pedersen (Lidl–Trek) before the Dane led into the final corner. However, David Gaudu (Groupama–FDJ) divebombed the corner to take the lead out of the exit, outsprinting Pedersen to win the stage. Vingegaard took third to take four bonus seconds, which allowed him to keep the red jersey over Gaudu, who had the same time as the race leader. The race went from Italy to France on the fourth stage. The first half of the stage contained three categorized climbs before a long descent led to mostly flat parcours in the second half of the stage. Despite the amount of climbing, the stage was decided by a bunch sprint with Ben Turner (INEOS Grenadiers) edging out Philipsen to win his first Grand Tour stage. By finishing 25th on the stage compared to Vingegaard's 42nd place, Gaudu took the red jersey by having the least sum of stage finish positions from the first four stages.

The race reached Spain on the fifth stage as the riders tackled a 24.1-kilometre (15.0 mi) flat team time trial in Figueres. Lidl–Trek sat in the hot seat for most of the day but their time was eventually beaten by UAE Team Emirates XRG and Visma–Lease a Bike, with the former beating the latter by just eight seconds. Vingegaard regained the red jersey after Gaudu lost 16 seconds to the Dane while the UAE Team Emirates XRG trio of Juan Ayuso, João Almeida, and Marc Soler occupied second to fourth places in the GC at just eight seconds down. Protestors with Palestinian flags blocked Israel–Premier Tech's team time trial. The team finished the stage in 19th place of 23, 54 seconds to the stage winners, but were then awarded 15 seconds due to the protest, thus placing them in 14th place. One protestor was arrested. Vuelta's director, Javier Guillén, responded to the protest by stating "they cannot allow what happened". Some sports commentators commended the protesters, but disapproved that the protest affected only one team and for putting rider safety at risk during the protest. Other commentators disapproved the protest all together affirming that the Vuelta is not the place for such protests.

The riders tackled the first proper mountain stage on the sixth stage, which featured three climbs before a summit finish at Pal in Andorra (9.6 km at 6.3%). A group of 10 riders built a lead of almost seven minutes on the peloton, which was content to let them fight for the stage win. Jay Vine (UAE Team Emirates XRG) attacked over the top of the penultimate climb, the Alto de la Comella, before holding off Torstein Træen (Team Bahrain Victorious) on the final climb to win the stage. In the peloton, the big news on the day was Ayuso losing seven minutes on the final climb to drop out of GC contention. Ciccone attacked once with Vingegaard on his wheel but most of the main GC contenders were able to claw their way back by the finish. Træen finished three and a half minutes ahead of the main GC group to take over the lead of the general classification.

The seventh stage featured a second successive mountainous stage as the riders tackled the climbs of Port del Cantó (24.7 km at 4.4%), Puerto de la Creu de Perves (5.7 km at 6.3%), and Coll de L'Espina (7.1 km at 5.5%) before finishing atop Cerler (12.1 km at 5.8%). After losing seven minutes the previous day, Ayuso bounced back in the break, dropping his breakaway companions on the final climb to win the stage. This marked UAE Team Emirates XRG's third consecutive stage win. Despite an attack from Almeida, there was another GC stalemate as most of the contenders finished in the main GC group, which meant that Træen kept the red jersey. The eighth stage was a flat stage with no categorized climbs. The stage went to an expected bunch sprint, where Philipsen came around Elia Viviani (Lotto) to win his second stage of this year's Vuelta. Viviani was eventually relegated for deviating too much during his sprint.

The first week of the Vuelta ended with another uphill finish as the riders finished atop the first-category Estación de Esquí de Valdezcaray (13.2 km at 5%). After the break was caught at the bottom of the final climb, Matteo Jorgenson (Visma–Lease a Bike) began to set a furious pace, splitting the peloton to pieces before Vingegaard launched his attack. The only rider to stay with him was Ciccone, who was able to follow for a kilometre before blowing up. Vingegaard soloed all the way to the top, winning the stage by 24 seconds over Tom Pidcock (Q36.5 Pro Cycling Team) and Almeida. Felix Gall (Decathlon–AG2R La Mondiale) crossed the line at a minute down while the remnants of the GC group, which included Træen, finished at 1' 46" behind. This meant that Træen kept the red jersey but by a reduced advantage of 37 seconds over Vingegaard.

=== Week two ===
Following the first rest day, the Vuelta resumed with a hilly stage which finished atop the Puerto de Belagua (9.4 km at 6.3%). The fight to join the break took over 100 kilometres (62 mi) before a group of 28 riders was finally able to get away. The break went all the way to the finish with Vine emerging as the strongest on the final climb to win his second stage of the race. In the peloton, Almeida attacked twice on the final climb but most of the contenders finished together. Among the riders to lose time were Gall and Bernal, who lost 26 and 37 seconds, respectively, while Træen lost more than a minute. Vingegaard regained the red jersey by 26 seconds on Træen and 38 seconds on Almeida.

The eleventh stage featured a hilly 167-kilometre (104 mi) stage around Bilbao that was expected to suit the puncheurs with seven categorized climbs that were scattered throughout the stage. Initially, the battle for the stage came down to a battle between the GC contenders. Almeida attacked twice on the penultimate climb up Alto del Vivero but there was a regrouping on the descent. On the approach to Alto de Pike, the race center announced that due to pro-Palestinian protests at the finish, the GC times were to be taken at the 3-kilometre (1.9 mi) mark and that there was going to be no stage winner. On the final climb of Alto de Pike, Pidcock distanced Vingegaard twice but the Dane rode back to his wheel. The pair crossed the 3-kilometre (1.9 mi) mark with a gap of 10 seconds on a group of chasers including Almeida, Gall, Hindley, and Jorgenson. Apart from the finish, the stage was marked by several other pro-Palestine protests. Following the stage, Pidcock expressed frustration at being denied a stage win, stating that "everyone has the right to protest whatever they want – putting us in danger is not the way forward.” Media reported that some riders wished off the record for Israel–Premier Tech to withdraw from the event.

On stage twelve, the riders tackled a parcours that was tailor-made for a breakaway battle. There were two categorized climbs on the menu - the second-category Puerto de Alisas (8.6 km at 5.8%) and the first-category Collada de Brenes (7 km at 7.9%). A 53-man group broke away and contested the stage win. On the final climb, Ayuso and Romo gapped the rest of the break and battled it out for the stage. Ayuso outsprinted Romo to win his second stage of the race. The race headed back to the mountains on the thirteenth stage with the riders tackling the famous climb of Alto de l'Angliru (12.4 km at 9.7%). After UAE Team Emirates XRG lifted the pace from the Alto del Cordal, Almeida lifted the pace on the steep portion of the Angliru. Eventually, only Vingegaard was able to follow his pace but the Dane was unable to attack. In the sprint, Almeida held off Vingegaard to win the stage, marking his team’s sixth win in this race. In the GC, Vingegaard’s lead was reduced to 46 seconds on Almeida with the latter’s stage win.

The riders tackled another summit finish on the fourteenth stage as the riders finished atop La Farrapona (16.9 km at 5.9%). A group of 24 riders was allowed to fight for the win. Ahead of the final climb, Soler attacked from the break and soloed off the front. He held off the peloton to win his team’s seventh stage of the race. In the peloton, due to the headwind on the final climb, there was a GC stalemate until the final kilometre when Hindley attacked with Almeida and Vingegaard on his wheel. At the finish, Vingegaard outsprinted Almeida to take second place, extending his lead on GC to 48 seconds. The last stage before the second rest day featured a hilly parcours that was expected to suit the breakaway. A group of 47 riders went away after the first climb of the day. Vine and Louis Vervaeke (Soudal–Quick-Step) attacked from the break with 119 kilometres (74 mi) left, building a lead of three minutes. They were soon caught by a seven-man chase group with 6.8 kilometres (4.2 mi) to go. In the sprint for the win, Pedersen outsprinted Aular, taking his first win of the race. The peloton rolled over across the line at more than 13 minutes down. During the stage, another pro-Palestine protester tried to enter a road while carrying a Palestinian flag, causing Romo and Edward Planckaert to crash. Romo subsequently withdrew from the race altogether following the rest day.

=== Week three ===
Following the last rest day, the sixteenth stage was a hilly stage that was expected to suit the breakaway again, featuring four categorized climbs in the last 100 kilometres (62 mi). A 17-man break survived to the finish for the third successive stage. The break whittled down until only Bernal, Mikel Landa (Soudal–Quick-Step), and Clément Braz Afonso (Groupama–FDJ) were left in front at the top of the penultimate climb. Braz Afonso suffered a puncture on the approach to the final climb of Castro de Herville. Shortly after, the race organizers announced that due to pro-Palestinian protests on the final climb, the finish line was moved to the 8-kilometre (5.0 mi) mark, leaving out the final climb. Bernal won the sprint to the revised finish line ahead of Landa, winning his first Grand Tour stage since his career-threatening crash in 2022. All of the main GC favorites finished together with the exception of Gall, who lost 54 seconds. Following the stage, members of the Cyclistes Professionnels Associés (CPA) riders union voted to continue racing, but would reconsider if safety of riders was at risk. Organisers stated that the race would reach the finish in Madrid, calling the protests "illegal".

Stage seventeen featured the penultimate summit finish of the race with the riders finishing atop the first-category Alto de El Morredero (8.8 km at 9.7%). After the break was caught at the foot of the final climb, Visma–Lease a Bike set the pace before Hindley attacked. Almeida and Giulio Pellizzari (Red Bull–Bora–Hansgrohe) were briefly distanced by the attack but they were able to come back. Near the top, Pellizzari was able to get a gap as the favorites looked at each other. The Italian held on to win his first Grand Tour stage. In the GC, Vingegaard extended his lead to 50 seconds on Almeida while Pidcock extended his gap by four seconds on Hindley in the battle for third. The eighteenth stage featured the only individual time trial of the race around Valladolid. Originally, the riders were set to ride 27.2 kilometres (16.9 mi) but a day before the stage, due to the threat of protests and to ensure the safety of the riders, the race organizers decided to shorten the stage to 12.2 kilometres (7.6 mi). Filippo Ganna (INEOS Grenadiers), the big favorite for the stage, won with a time of exactly 13 minutes, which was only threatened by Vine who was less than a second slower. In the battle for the red jersey, Vingegaard lost ten seconds to Almeida, who finished third on the stage, which meant that his lead was reduced to 40 seconds with one final mountain stage coming on stage 20.

Stage nineteen was a transition stage from Rueda to Guijuelo that was expected to suit the sprinters. At the intermediate sprint, with a lone rider up the road and four bonus seconds still available for the peloton, Visma–Lease a Bike managed to deliver Vingegaard to the front, adding four seconds to his lead as UAE Team Emirates XRG were caught asleep. The stage came down to the expected bunch sprint where Philipsen comfortably won the sprint ahead of Pedersen and Aular to take his third stage of the race..

The penultimate stage of the race featured the last mountain stage with the riders finishing atop the special-category Bola del Mundo (12.3 km at 8.6%), where the last 3 kilometres (1.9 mi) averaged over 12%. UAE Team Emirates XRG set a hard pace all day in an attempt to crack Vingegaard, which meant that the break was never able to build a big lead. On the final climb, Pellizzari and Gall struggled early on and lost more than two minutes. As the riders approached the Bola del Mundo, Almeida and Hindley lifted the pace but they were not able to get any significant gap. Before the final kilometre, Vingegaard dropped the rest to win his third stage and seal the red jersey. Pidcock only lost nine seconds to Hindley to seal his place on the final podium.

=== Final stage in Madrid ===
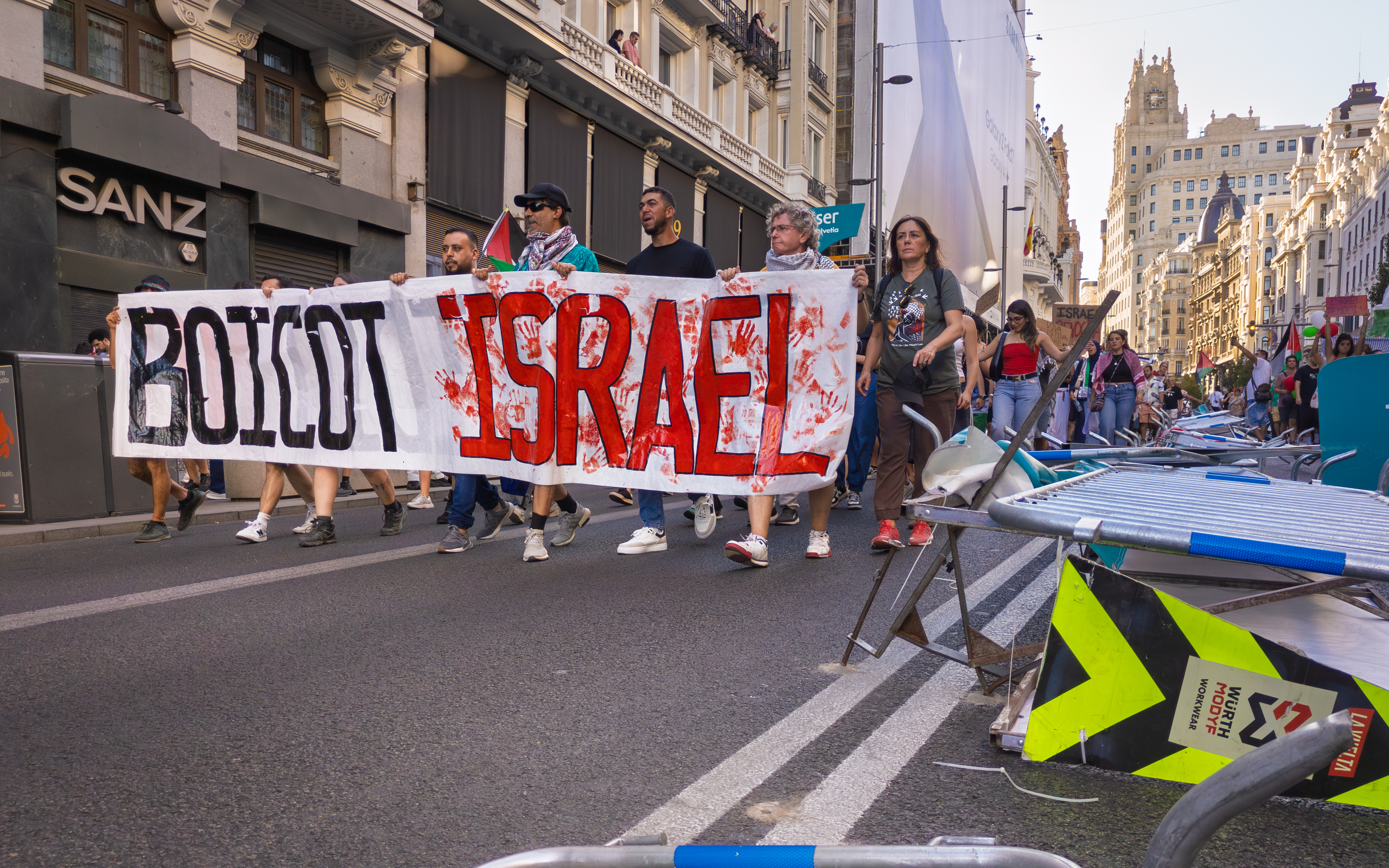
Pro-Palestinian demonstrators march down Gran Vía, Madrid carrying a "Boicot Israel" banner after forcing the cancellation of the final stage of the race.

The final stage of the Vuelta featured the traditional flat stage to the city of Madrid, but demonstrations against the Gaza war and the participation of the Israel–Premier Tech team in the Vuelta had been called for that day along the route. Prior to the start of the final stage, Prime Minister Pedro Sánchez had expressed his admiration for pro-Palestinian protesters, while the President of the Community of Madrid, Isabel Díaz Ayuso, of the conservative People's Party, showed her support to the Israel–Premier Tech team by visiting the team, shaking hands and taking pictures with them.

The first part of the stage featured the ceremonial procession before reaching Madrid where some of the riders posed for pictures at the front of the race, particularly the teams of the jersey winners and the GC podium finishers. However, approximately 100,000 demonstrators protesting against the Gaza war had gathered in Madrid along the route, in what was described as a "festive atmosphere" with isolated incidents. However, before the riders reached the finish line in Madrid, at around 18:00, protesters invaded the road at several points of the final circuit, prompting the police to respond with tear gas, rubber bullets and charging against the demonstrators. The riders were ordered to stop and, at 18:30, the race organizers cancelled the stage altogether. The police charges and teargas continued after the cancellation of the stage, injuring one journalist and detaining two demonstrators. The official podium ceremony was also cancelled. Riders and teams subsequently staged a private podium ceremony in a car park.

After the stage, Vingegaard expressed his disappointment at the cancellation, stating "I was looking forward to celebrating this overall win with my team and the fans. Everyone has the right to protest, but not in a way that influences or endangers our race". Michal Kwiatkowski criticised the organisers and the UCI, stating "If [they] couldn’t make the right decisions early enough, then long-term it’s very bad for cycling that the protesters managed to get what they wanted". Organisers Unipublic condemned the protests, but noted that they could not have excluded Israel–Premier Tech from the race. The UCI issued a statement that criticised the Spanish Prime Minister and the government for supporting the protesters. The UCI also called into question Spain's ability to host major international sporting events, "ensuring that they take place in safe conditions and in accordance with the principles of the Olympic Charter". Media noted that the 2026 Tour de France would start in Barcelona, and that Israel–Premier Tech are likely to have an automatic invitation to the race.

Political reactions to the day's events were mostly along party lines. The conservative Mayor of Madrid José Luis Martínez-Almeida blamed Sánchez for the abandonment of the stage and concluded: "They have managed to ruin the final stage of the Vuelta and give a shameful image of our country." Isabel Díaz Ayuso also accused Sánchez of "being the only one happy with what happened". Leader of the opposition and president of the People's Party Alberto Núñez Feijóo stated the "government has allowed and induced the non-completion of La Vuelta, and thus, an international ridicule televised around the world". Israel's Minister of Foreign Affairs, Gideon Sa'ar, accused the Spanish Government of "inciting" the protests.

Left-wing parties in Spain celebrated the outcome of the race. Prime Minister Sánchez expressed his "deep admiration" for the pro-Palestinian protests, and stated that "sports organisations need to ask themselves whether it’s ethical for Israel to keep taking part in international competitions". The Second Deputy Prime Minister of Spain, Yolanda Díaz of the Communist Party of Spain, stated that "Spanish society does not tolerate the normalization of the genocide in Gaza at sporting and cultural events. Israel cannot participate in any event. We fully support the mobilizations for the Palestinian people during the cycling tour. Our citizens are an example of dignity". The Member of the European Parliament of Podemos, Irene Montero, took to social media to respond to Ayuso's visit to the team: "The social mobilization against genocide is doing what the government should have done. The Vuelta has stopped! The people of Madrid have responded to Ayuso, who today lent her hand to the genocidaires' team."

== Classification leadership ==
Classification leadership by stage
Stage	Winner	General classification	Points classification	Mountains classification	Young rider classification	Team classification	Combativity award
1	Jasper Philipsen	Jasper Philipsen	Jasper Philipsen (Note: On stage 2, Pepijn Reinderink, who was third in the points classification, wore the green jersey, because first placed Jasper Philipsen wore the red jersey as the leader of the general classification and second placed Ethan Vernon wore the white jersey as leader of the young rider classification.)	Alessandro Verre	Ethan Vernon	Q36.5 Pro Cycling Team	Hugo de la Calle
2	Jonas Vingegaard	Jonas Vingegaard	Jasper Philipsen	Jonas Vingegaard (Note: On stage 3, Alessandro Verre, who was second in the mountains classification, wore the polka dot jersey, because first placed Jonas Vingegaard wore the red jersey as the leader of the general classification.)	Juan Ayuso	Visma–Lease a Bike	Liam Slock
3	David Gaudu	Jonas Vingegaard	Jonas Vingegaard (Note: On stage 4, Giulio Ciccone, who was second in the points classification, wore the green jersey, because first placed Jonas Vingegaard wore the red jersey as the leader of the general classification.)	Alessandro Verre	Juan Ayuso	Visma–Lease a Bike	Sean Quinn
4	Ben Turner	David Gaudu	Mads Pedersen	Joel Nicolau	Juan Ayuso	Visma–Lease a Bike	Sean Quinn
5	UAE Team Emirates XRG	Jonas Vingegaard	Mads Pedersen	Joel Nicolau	Juan Ayuso	UAE Team Emirates XRG	no award
6	Jay Vine	Torstein Træen	Mads Pedersen	Jay Vine	Giulio Pellizzari	UAE Team Emirates XRG	Jay Vine
7	Juan Ayuso	Torstein Træen	Mads Pedersen	Jay Vine	Giulio Pellizzari	UAE Team Emirates XRG	Juan Ayuso
8	Jasper Philipsen	Torstein Træen	Mads Pedersen	Jay Vine	Giulio Pellizzari	UAE Team Emirates XRG	Sergio Samitier
9	Jonas Vingegaard	Torstein Træen	Mads Pedersen	Jay Vine	Giulio Pellizzari	UAE Team Emirates XRG	Michał Kwiatkowski
10	Jay Vine	Jonas Vingegaard	Mads Pedersen	Jay Vine	Giulio Pellizzari	UAE Team Emirates XRG	Javier Romo
11	No winner declared (Note: No winner was named for stage 11 as the stage was shortened due to pro-Palestinian protests.)	Jonas Vingegaard	Mads Pedersen	Jay Vine	Giulio Pellizzari	UAE Team Emirates XRG	Tom Pidcock
12	Juan Ayuso	Jonas Vingegaard	Mads Pedersen	Jay Vine	Giulio Pellizzari	UAE Team Emirates XRG	Mads Pedersen
13	João Almeida	Jonas Vingegaard	Mads Pedersen	Jay Vine	Giulio Pellizzari	UAE Team Emirates XRG	Bob Jungels
14	Marc Soler	Jonas Vingegaard	Mads Pedersen	Jay Vine	Giulio Pellizzari	UAE Team Emirates XRG	Marc Soler
15	Mads Pedersen	Jonas Vingegaard	Mads Pedersen	Jay Vine	Giulio Pellizzari	UAE Team Emirates XRG	Louis Vervaeke
16	Egan Bernal	Jonas Vingegaard	Mads Pedersen	Jay Vine	Giulio Pellizzari	UAE Team Emirates XRG	Mikel Landa
17	Giulio Pellizzari	Jonas Vingegaard	Mads Pedersen	Jay Vine	Giulio Pellizzari	UAE Team Emirates XRG	Antonio Tiberi
18	Filippo Ganna	Jonas Vingegaard	Mads Pedersen	Jay Vine	Giulio Pellizzari	UAE Team Emirates XRG	no award
19	Jasper Philipsen	Jonas Vingegaard	Mads Pedersen	Jay Vine	Giulio Pellizzari	UAE Team Emirates XRG	Jakub Otruba
20	Jonas Vingegaard	Jonas Vingegaard	Mads Pedersen	Jay Vine	Matthew Riccitello	UAE Team Emirates XRG	Mikel Landa
21	No winner declared (Note: No winner was declared for stage 21 as pro-Palestinian protestors blocked the race route.)	Jonas Vingegaard	Mads Pedersen	Jay Vine	Matthew Riccitello	UAE Team Emirates XRG	no award
Final		Jonas Vingegaard	Mads Pedersen	Jay Vine	Matthew Riccitello	UAE Team Emirates XRG	Joel Nicolau

== Classification standings ==
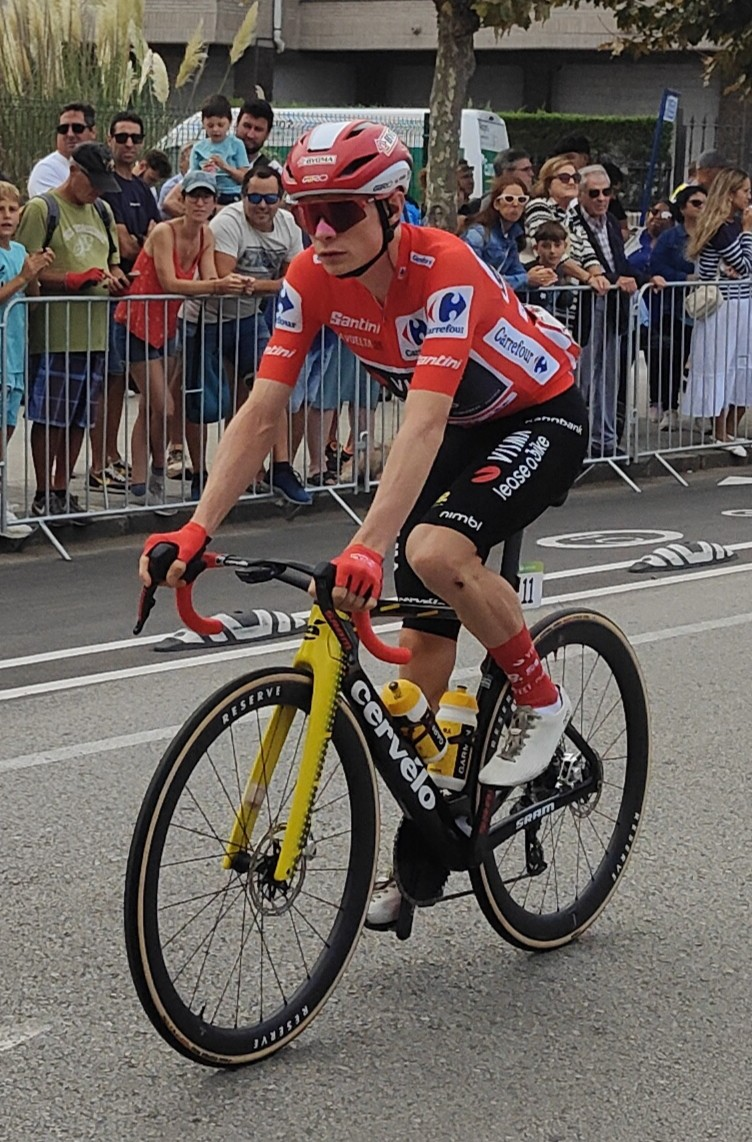
Winner of the general classification Jonas Vingegaard, pictured on stage 12

Legend
Denotes the winner of the general classification	Denotes the winner of the young rider classification
Denotes the winner of the points classification	Denotes the winner of the team classification
Denotes the winner of the mountains classification	Denotes the winner of the combativity award

=== General classification ===
Final general classification (1–10)
Rank	Rider	Team	Time
1	Jonas Vingegaard (DEN)	Visma–Lease a Bike	74h 20' 28"
2	João Almeida (POR)	UAE Team Emirates XRG	+ 1' 16"
3	Tom Pidcock (GBR)	Q36.5 Pro Cycling Team	+ 3' 11"
4	Jai Hindley (AUS)	Red Bull–Bora–Hansgrohe	+ 3' 41"
5	Matthew Riccitello (USA)	Israel–Premier Tech	+ 5' 55"
6	Giulio Pellizzari (ITA)	Red Bull–Bora–Hansgrohe	+ 7' 23"
7	Sepp Kuss (USA)	Visma–Lease a Bike	+ 7' 45"
8	Felix Gall (AUT)	Decathlon–AG2R La Mondiale	+ 7' 50"
9	Torstein Træen (NOR)	Team Bahrain Victorious	+ 9' 48"
10	Matteo Jorgenson (USA)	Visma–Lease a Bike	+ 12' 16"

Final general classification (11–153)
Rank	Rider	Team	Time
11	Junior Lecerf (BEL)	Soudal–Quick-Step	+ 14' 00"
12	Harold Tejada (COL)	XDS Astana Team	+ 21' 31"
13	Abel Balderstone (ESP)	Caja Rural–Seguros RGA	+ 28' 07"
14	Jaume Guardeño (ESP)	Caja Rural–Seguros RGA	+ 30' 30"
15	Santiago Buitrago (COL)	Team Bahrain Victorious	+ 45' 38"
16	Louis Meintjes (RSA)	Intermarché–Wanty	+ 45' 39"
17	Egan Bernal (COL)	INEOS Grenadiers	+ 46' 26"
18	Giulio Ciccone (ITA)	Lidl–Trek	+ 48' 17"
19	Bruno Armirail (FRA)	Decathlon–AG2R La Mondiale	+ 48' 30"
20	Kevin Vermaerke (USA)	Israel–Premier Tech	+ 50' 08"
21	Eddie Dunbar (IRL)	Team Jayco–AlUla	+ 57' 19"
22	Harold Martín López (ECU)	XDS Astana Team	+ 59' 23"
23	Rudy Molard (FRA)	Groupama–FDJ	+ 1h 00' 51"
24	Ben Tulett (GBR)	Visma–Lease a Bike	+ 1h 04' 46"
25	Felix Großschartner (AUT)	UAE Team Emirates XRG	+ 1h 09' 30"
26	Marc Soler (ESP)	UAE Team Emirates XRG	+ 1h 11' 14"
27	Mikel Landa (ESP)	Soudal–Quick-Step	+ 1h 18' 26"
28	Damien Howson (AUS)	Q36.5 Pro Cycling Team	+ 1h 19' 07"
29	Finlay Pickering (GBR)	Team Bahrain Victorious	+ 1h 22' 02"
30	Jay Vine (AUS)	UAE Team Emirates XRG	+ 1h 27' 41"
31	Sergio Samitier (ESP)	Cofidis	+ 1h 33' 20"
32	Marco Frigo (ITA)	Israel–Premier Tech	+ 1h 34' 17"
33	Julien Bernard (FRA)	Lidl–Trek	+ 1h 39' 06"
34	Jefferson Alveiro Cepeda (ECU)	Movistar Team	+ 1h 43' 22"
35	Clément Braz Afonso (FRA)	Groupama–FDJ	+ 1h 43' 34"
36	Wout Poels (NED)	XDS Astana Team	+ 1h 48' 56"
37	Louis Vervaeke (BEL)	Soudal–Quick-Step	+ 1h 50' 12"
38	Andrea Bagioli (ITA)	Lidl–Trek	+ 1h 57' 31"
39	Pierre Thierry (FRA)	Arkéa–B&B Hotels	+ 1h 59' 17"
40	Fausto Masnada (ITA)	XDS Astana Team	+ 2h 01' 00"
41	Antonio Tiberi (ITA)	Team Bahrain Victorious	+ 2h 01' 24"
42	Johannes Staune-Mittet (NOR)	Decathlon–AG2R La Mondiale	+ 2h 01' 41"
43	Jan Hirt (CZE)	Israel–Premier Tech	+ 2h 01' 43"
44	Bob Jungels (LUX)	INEOS Grenadiers	+ 2h 04' 14"
45	Brieuc Rolland (FRA)	Groupama–FDJ	+ 2h 04' 21"
46	Callum Scotson (AUS)	Decathlon–AG2R La Mondiale	+ 2h 09' 37"
47	José Luis Faura (ESP)	Burgos Burpellet BH	+ 2h 13' 57"
48	Lorenzo Fortunato (ITA)	XDS Astana Team	+ 2h 15' 02"
49	Gijs Leemreize (NED)	Team Picnic–PostNL	+ 2h 16' 48"
50	Markel Beloki (ESP)	EF Education–EasyPost	+ 2h 21' 45"
51	Ben Zwiehoff (GER)	Red Bull–Bora–Hansgrohe	+ 2h 22' 31"
52	Léo Bisiaux (FRA)	Decathlon–AG2R La Mondiale	+ 2h 22' 33"
53	Chris Hamilton (AUS)	Team Picnic–PostNL	+ 2h 25' 56"
54	Juan Guillermo Martínez (COL)	Team Picnic–PostNL	+ 2h 27' 08"
55	Carlos Canal (ESP)	Movistar Team	+ 2h 28' 38"
56	Giovanni Aleotti (ITA)	Red Bull–Bora–Hansgrohe	+ 2h 28' 38"
57	Lars Craps (BEL)	Lotto	+ 2h 29' 14"
58	Eduardo Sepúlveda (ARG)	Lotto	+ 2h 30' 57"
59	Victor Langellotti (MON)	INEOS Grenadiers	+ 2h 32' 10"
60	Carlos Verona (ESP)	Lidl–Trek	+ 2h 32' 57"
61	Sander De Pestel (BEL)	Decathlon–AG2R La Mondiale	+ 2h 33' 33"
62	Wilco Kelderman (NED)	Visma–Lease a Bike	+ 2h 38' 47"
63	Hugo de la Calle (ESP)	Burgos Burpellet BH	+ 2h 42' 30"
64	Joan Bou (ESP)	Caja Rural–Seguros RGA	+ 2h 43' 12"
65	Magnus Sheffield (USA)	INEOS Grenadiers	+ 2h 44' 56"
66	James Shaw (GBR)	EF Education–EasyPost	+ 2h 46' 06"
67	David González (ESP)	Q36.5 Pro Cycling Team	+ 2h 47' 42"
68	Juan Ayuso (ESP)	UAE Team Emirates XRG	+ 2h 47' 57"
69	Sergio Chumil (GUA)	Burgos Burpellet BH	+ 2h 49' 38"
70	Alex Molenaar (NED)	Caja Rural–Seguros RGA	+ 2h 50' 43"
71	Nicola Conci (ITA)	XDS Astana Team	+ 2h 51' 32"
72	Michel Hessmann (GER)	Movistar Team	+ 2h 51' 52"
73	Mauri Vansevenant (BEL)	Soudal–Quick-Step	+ 2h 53' 37"
74	Maximilian Schachmann (GER)	Soudal–Quick-Step	+ 2h 54' 04"
75	Sean Quinn (USA)	EF Education–EasyPost	+ 2h 55' 04"
76	Stefan Küng (SUI)	Groupama–FDJ	+ 2h 55' 41"
77	Jesús Herrada (ESP)	Cofidis	+ 2h 56' 36"
78	Guillermo Thomas Silva (URU)	Caja Rural–Seguros RGA	+ 2h 58' 10"
79	Roman Ermakov	Team Bahrain Victorious	+ 2h 58' 48"
80	Jack Haig (AUS)	Team Bahrain Victorious	+ 2h 59' 42"
81	Brandon Rivera (COL)	INEOS Grenadiers	+ 3h 01' 23"
82	Mathijs Paasschens (NED)	Team Bahrain Victorious	+ 3h 01' 46"
83	Michał Kwiatkowski (POL)	INEOS Grenadiers	+ 3h 02' 25"
84	Finn Fisher-Black (NZL)	Red Bull–Bora–Hansgrohe	+ 3h 05' 04"
85	Jordan Labrosse (FRA)	Decathlon–AG2R La Mondiale	+ 3h 09' 59"
86	Nans Peters (FRA)	Decathlon–AG2R La Mondiale	+ 3h 10' 09"
87	Nico Denz (GER)	Red Bull–Bora–Hansgrohe	+ 3h 10' 43"
88	Orluis Aular (VEN)	Movistar Team	+ 3h 11' 02"
89	Jonas Gregaard (DEN)	Lotto	+ 3h 11' 10"
90	Jakub Otruba (CZE)	Caja Rural–Seguros RGA	+ 3h 12' 26"
91	Mario Aparicio (ESP)	Burgos Burpellet BH	+ 3h 12' 44"
92	Bjoern Koerdt (GBR)	Team Picnic–PostNL	+ 3h 13' 49"
93	Jardi van der Lee (NED)	EF Education–EasyPost	+ 3h 14' 12"
94	Kelland O'Brien (AUS)	Team Jayco–AlUla	+ 3h 14' 30"
95	Simone Petilli (ITA)	Intermarché–Wanty	+ 3h 15' 26"
96	Alec Segaert (BEL)	Lotto	+ 3h 16' 15"
97	David Gaudu (FRA)	Groupama–FDJ	+ 3h 16' 55"
98	Emanuel Buchmann (GER)	Cofidis	+ 3h 17' 06"
99	Louis Rouland (FRA)	Arkéa–B&B Hotels	+ 3h 17' 20"
100	Patrick Gamper (AUT)	Team Jayco–AlUla	+ 3h 18' 44"
101	Gal Glivar (SLO)	Alpecin–Deceuninck	+ 3h 19' 37"
102	David de la Cruz (ESP)	Q36.5 Pro Cycling Team	+ 3h 21' 52"
103	Thibaud Gruel (FRA)	Groupama–FDJ	+ 3h 24' 03"
104	Lukas Nerurkar (GBR)	EF Education–EasyPost	+ 3h 24' 13"
105	Nicolas Vinokurov (KAZ)	XDS Astana Team	+ 3h 26' 40"
106	Jonas Rickaert (BEL)	Alpecin–Deceuninck	+ 3h 28' 01"
107	Iván García Cortina (ESP)	Movistar Team	+ 3h 28' 55"
108	Pier-André Côté (CAN)	Israel–Premier Tech	+ 3h 31' 36"
109	Ivo Oliveira (POR)	UAE Team Emirates XRG	+ 3h 31' 41"
110	Christopher Juul-Jensen (DEN)	Team Jayco–AlUla	+ 3h 32' 28"
111	Joel Nicolau (ESP)	Caja Rural–Seguros RGA	+ 3h 36' 13"
112	Nickolas Zukowsky (CAN)	Q36.5 Pro Cycling Team	+ 3h 38' 01"
113	Alessandro Verre (ITA)	Arkéa–B&B Hotels	+ 3h 38' 20"
114	Marcel Camprubí (ESP)	Q36.5 Pro Cycling Team	+ 3h 39' 36"
115	Kamiel Bonneu (BEL)	Intermarché–Wanty	+ 3h 40' 58"
116	Huub Artz (NED)	Intermarché–Wanty	+ 3h 42' 02"
117	Nicolò Buratti (ITA)	Team Bahrain Victorious	+ 3h 42' 13"
118	Luca Van Boven (BEL)	Intermarché–Wanty	+ 3h 42' 14"
119	Edward Planckaert (BEL)	Alpecin–Deceuninck	+ 3h 44' 23"
120	Léandre Lozouet (FRA)	Arkéa–B&B Hotels	+ 3h 49' 26"
121	Victor Guernalec (FRA)	Arkéa–B&B Hotels	+ 3h 52' 49"
122	Matteo Sobrero (ITA)	Team Jayco–AlUla	+ 3h 53' 01"
123	Dion Smith (NZL)	Intermarché–Wanty	+ 3h 53' 08"
124	Rémi Cavagna (FRA)	Groupama–FDJ	+ 3h 55' 18"
125	Mads Pedersen (DEN)	Lidl–Trek	+ 3h 56' 59"
126	Madis Mihkels (EST)	EF Education–EasyPost	+ 4h 00' 51"
127	Ben Turner (GBR)	INEOS Grenadiers	+ 4h 06' 04"
128	Dries De Pooter (BEL)	Intermarché–Wanty	+ 4h 07' 09"
129	Jake Stewart (GBR)	Israel–Premier Tech	+ 4h 08' 08"
130	Dylan van Baarle (NED)	Visma–Lease a Bike	+ 4h 08' 16"
131	Filippo Ganna (ITA)	INEOS Grenadiers	+ 4h 08' 59"
132	Tobias Bayer (AUT)	Alpecin–Deceuninck	+ 4h 10' 00"
133	Fabio Christen (SUI)	Q36.5 Pro Cycling Team	+ 4h 11' 52"
134	Liam Slock (BEL)	Lotto	+ 4h 11' 58"
135	Amanuel Ghebreigzabhier (ERI)	Lidl–Trek	+ 4h 13' 29"
136	Bryan Coquard (FRA)	Cofidis	+ 4h 15' 14"
137	Timo Roosen (NED)	Visma–Lease a Bike	+ 4h 20' 23"
138	Tim van Dijke (NED)	Red Bull–Bora–Hansgrohe	+ 4h 20' 23"
139	Mikkel Bjerg (DEN)	UAE Team Emirates XRG	+ 4h 20' 41"
140	Jasper De Buyst (BEL)	Lotto	+ 4h 21' 15"
141	Nadav Raisberg (ISR)	Israel–Premier Tech	+ 4h 24' 53"
142	Ethan Vernon (GBR)	Israel–Premier Tech	+ 4h 31' 47"
143	Jenthe Biermans (BEL)	Arkéa–B&B Hotels	+ 4h 32' 15"
144	Domen Novak (SLO)	UAE Team Emirates XRG	+ 4h 32' 39"
145	Jasper Philipsen (BEL)	Alpecin–Deceuninck	+ 4h 35' 03"
146	Arne Marit (BEL)	Intermarché–Wanty	+ 4h 36' 51"
147	Anders Foldager (DEN)	Team Jayco–AlUla	+ 4h 43' 01"
148	Søren Kragh Andersen (DEN)	Lidl–Trek	+ 4h 43' 07"
149	Daan Hoole (NED)	Lidl–Trek	+ 4h 44' 12"
150	Elia Viviani (ITA)	Lotto	+ 4h 44' 32"
151	Patrick Eddy (AUS)	Team Picnic–PostNL	+ 4h 54' 07"
152	Stanisław Aniołkowski (POL)	Cofidis	+ 4h 57' 02"
153	Oscar Riesebeek (NED)	Alpecin–Deceuninck	+ 5h 08' 37"

=== Points classification ===
Final points classification (1–10)
Rank	Rider	Team	Points
1	Mads Pedersen (DEN)	Lidl–Trek	277
2	Jonas Vingegaard (DEN)	Visma–Lease a Bike	197
3	Jasper Philipsen (BEL)	Alpecin–Deceuninck	135
4	João Almeida (POR)	UAE Team Emirates XRG	123
5	Giulio Ciccone (ITA)	Lidl–Trek	123
6	Ethan Vernon (GBR)	Israel–Premier Tech	123
7	Tom Pidcock (GBR)	Q36.5 Pro Cycling Team	104
8	Jai Hindley (AUS)	Red Bull–Bora–Hansgrohe	99
9	Jay Vine (AUS)	UAE Team Emirates XRG	94
10	Orluis Aular (VEN)	Movistar Team	93

=== Mountains classification ===
Final mountains classification (1–10)
Rank	Rider	Team	Points
1	Jay Vine (AUS)	UAE Team Emirates XRG	61
2	Jonas Vingegaard (DEN)	Visma–Lease a Bike	56
3	João Almeida (POR)	UAE Team Emirates XRG	32
4	Louis Vervaeke (BEL)	Soudal–Quick-Step	32
5	Joel Nicolau (ESP)	Caja Rural–Seguros RGA	31
6	Marc Soler (ESP)	UAE Team Emirates XRG	28
7	Juan Ayuso (ESP)	UAE Team Emirates XRG	26
8	Nicolas Vinokurov (KAZ)	XDS Astana Team	22
9	Mikel Landa (ESP)	Soudal–Quick-Step	22
10	Jai Hindley (AUS)	Red Bull–Bora–Hansgrohe	22

=== Young rider classification ===
Final young rider classification (1–10)
Rank	Rider	Team	Time
1	Matthew Riccitello (USA)	Israel–Premier Tech	74h 26' 23"
2	Giulio Pellizzari (ITA)	Red Bull–Bora–Hansgrohe	+ 1' 28"
3	Junior Lecerf (BEL)	Soudal–Quick-Step	+ 8' 05"
4	Abel Balderstone (ESP)	Caja Rural–Seguros RGA	+ 22' 12"
5	Jaume Guardeño (ESP)	Caja Rural–Seguros RGA	+ 24' 35"
6	Kevin Vermaerke (USA)	Team Picnic–PostNL	+ 44' 13"
7	Harold Martín López (ECU)	XDS Astana Team	+ 53' 28"
8	Ben Tulett (GBR)	Visma–Lease a Bike	+ 58' 51"
9	Finlay Pickering (GBR)	Team Bahrain Victorious	+ 1h 16' 07"
10	Marco Frigo (ITA)	Israel–Premier Tech	+ 1h 28' 22"

=== Team classification ===
Final team classification (1–10)
Rank	Team	Time
1	(United Arab Emirates) UAE Team Emirates XRG	222h 00' 59"
2	(Netherlands) Visma–Lease a Bike	+ 23' 01"
3	(Germany) Red Bull–Bora–Hansgrohe	+ 1h 20' 52"
4	(Spain) Caja Rural–Seguros RGA	+ 1h 40' 59"
5	Team Bahrain Victorious	+ 1h 53' 57"
6	(France) Decathlon–AG2R La Mondiale	+ 1h 56' 40"
7	(Belgium) Soudal–Quick-Step	+ 2h 03' 59"
8	(Kazakhstan) XDS Astana Team	+ 2h 04' 43"
9	Israel–Premier Tech	+ 2h 55' 09"
10	(Switzerland) Q36.5 Pro Cycling Team	+ 3h 16' 16"
