= Alessandro Verre =

Italian cyclist

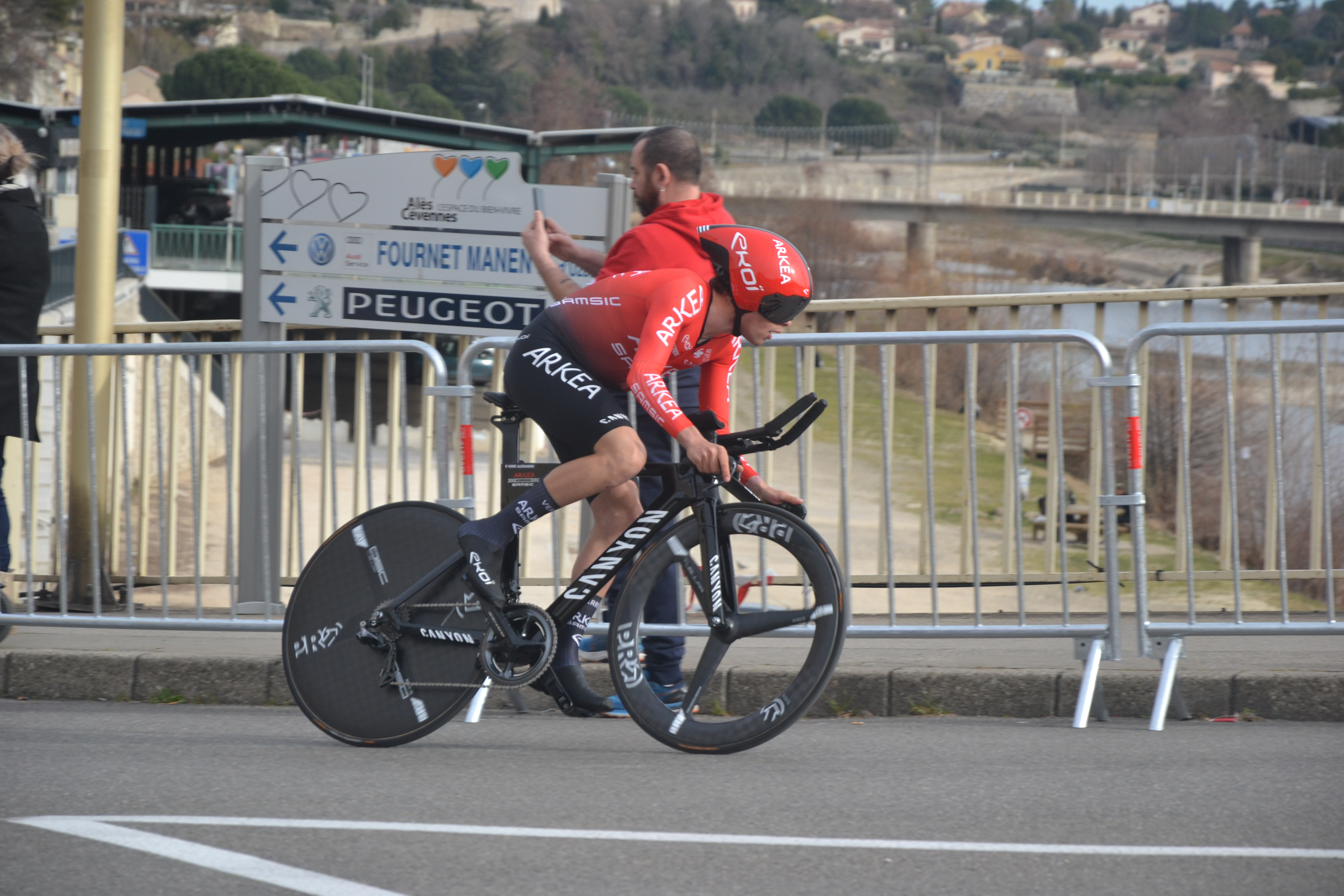
- Verre at the 2022 Étoile de Bessèges

Personal information
- Born: 17 November 2001 (age 24) Marsicovetere, Italy
- Height: 1.70 m (5 ft 7 in)
- Weight: 59 kg (130 lb)

Cycling career
- Sport: Cycling
- Current team: Arkéa–B&B Hotels
- Discipline: Road
- Role: Rider
- Rider type: Climber

Amateur teams
- 2014–2016: Loco Bikers
- 2017: Bykers Viggiano
- 2018–2019: CPS Professional Team Basilicata

Professional teams
- 2020: Casillo–Petroli Firenze–Hopplà
- 2021: Team Colpack–Ballan
- 2022–2025: Arkéa–Samsic
- 2026-: Team Colpack–Ballan

Alessandro Verre (born 17 November 2001) is an Italian cyclist, who currently rides for UCI ProTour MBH Bank CSB Telecom Fort.

== Major results ==
2019
3rd Trofeo Buffoni
3rd Trofeo Guido Dorigo
5th G.P. Sportivi Sovilla-La Piccola Sanremo
2021
1st Stage 1 Giro della Valle d'Aosta
6th Overall Giro Ciclistico d'Italia
2022
5th Giro dell'Appennino
10th GP Industria & Artigianato di Larciano
2023
10th Coppa Agostoni
2024
8th Giro dell'Appennino
9th Grand Prix of Aargau Canton
2025
Vuelta a España

Held after Stages 1 & 3

2026
3rd Overall Giro di Sardegna

=== Grand Tour general classification results timeline ===
| Grand Tour | 2023 | 2024 | 2025 |
|---|---|---|---|
| Giro d'Italia | DNF | 73 | 104 |
| Tour de France | — | — | — |
| Vuelta a España | — | — | 113 |

Legend
| — | Did not compete |
| DNF | Did not finish |
