= Matthew Riccitello =

American professional road cyclist (born 2002)

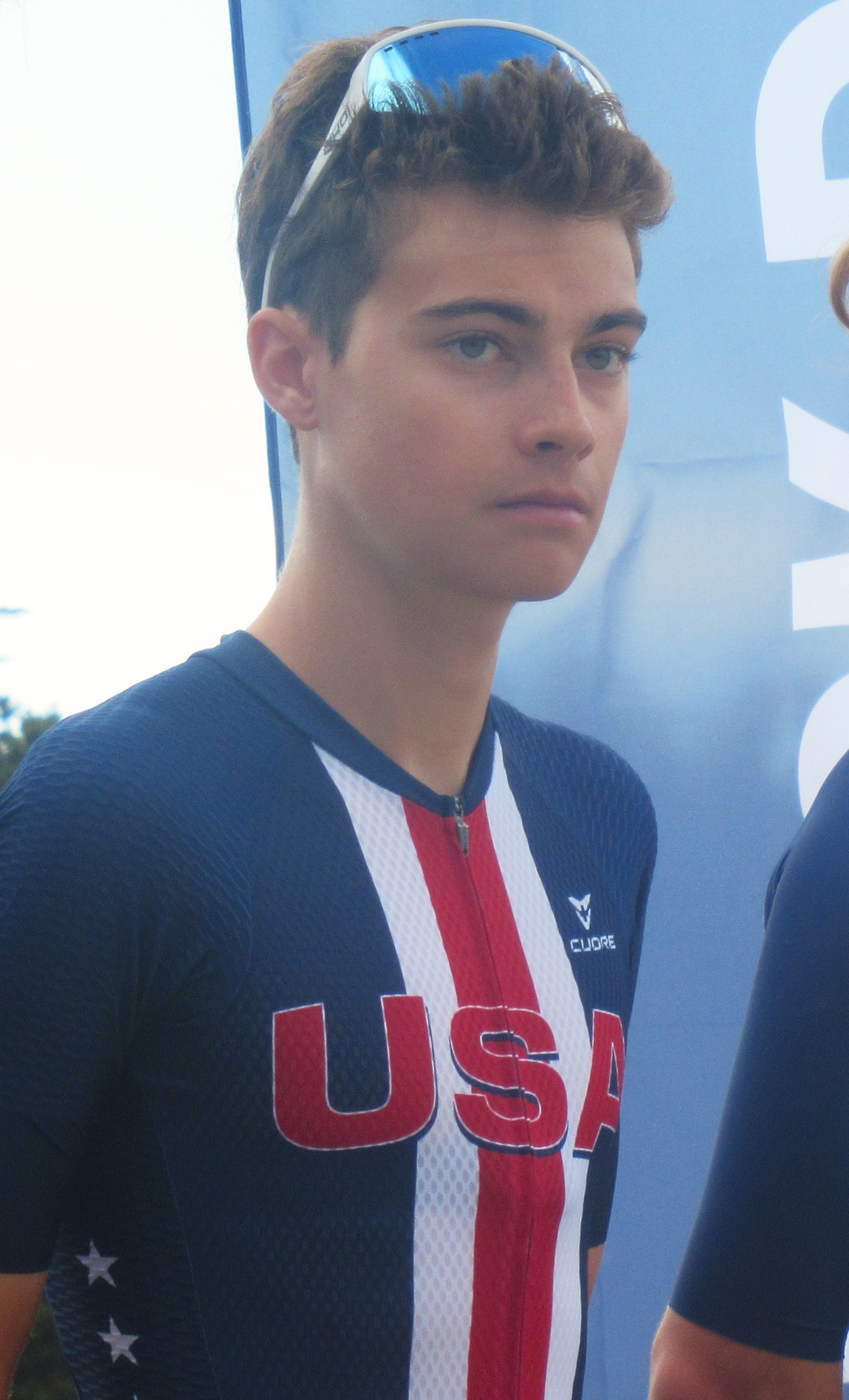
- Riccitello in 2023

Personal information
- Born: March 5, 2002 (age 24) Tucson, Arizona
- Height: 1.72 m (5 ft 8 in)
- Weight: 55 kg (121 lb)

Cycling career
- Sport: Cycling
- Current team: Decathlon CMA CGM
- Discipline: Road
- Role: Rider
- Rider type: Climber

Amateur teams
- 2015–2017: El Grupo Youth
- 2018–2020: LUX Cycling

Professional teams
- 2021–2022: Hagens Berman Axeon
- 2022: Israel–Premier Tech (stagiaire)
- 2023–2025: Israel–Premier Tech
- 2026–: Decathlon CMA CGM

Major wins
- Grand Tours Vuelta a España Young rider classification (2025)

Matthew Riccitello (born March 5, 2002) is an American professional road cyclist, who rides for UCI WorldTeam Decathlon CMA CGM. He has previously raced with Israel–Premier Tech.

Ricitello signed a three-year contract in late 2022 at the age of 20 to turn professional beginning with the 2023 calendar year. He made his Grand Tour debut at the 2023 Giro d'Italia, where he was the youngest rider in the race at the age of 21.

He signed for Decathlon CMA CGM ahead of the 2026 season.

Riccitello's father is former professional triathlete and XTerra World Champion Jimmy Riccitello.

== Major results ==
2019
2nd Time trial, National Junior Road Championships
2nd Overall Tour de l'Abitibi

1st Young rider classification

5th Overall Grand Prix Rüebliland
7th Overall Tour du Pays de Vaud
2020
1st Mount Graham Hill Climb
3rd Overall Valley of the Sun Stage Race
2021
1st FlapJack Flats Time Trial
2022
1st Overall Istrian Spring Trophy
4th Time trial, National Under-23 Road Championships
2023
4th Overall Tour de l'Avenir

1st Stage 7a (ITT)

9th Overall Vuelta a San Juan

1st Young rider classification

2024
5th Overall Tour de Suisse
6th Overall Sibiu Cycling Tour

1st Young rider classification

10th Mercan'Tour Classic
2025 (2 pro wins)
1st Overall Sibiu Cycling Tour

1st Mountains classification
1st Stage 2

5th Overall Vuelta a España

1st Young rider classification

9th Overall Tour of the Alps
2026 (3)
1st Overall Tour de la Provence

1st Mountains classification
1st Stage 2

1st Tour du Jura
2nd Classic Grand Besançon Doubs
6th Overall Volta ao Algarve
7th Overall Tour de Suisse
9th Overall Volta a Catalunya

=== Grand Tour general classification results timeline ===
Grand Tour	2023	2024	2025	2026
Giro d'Italia	56	—	—	—
Tour de France	—	—	—	24
Vuelta a España	—	30	5	
