= Brieuc Rolland =

French cyclist

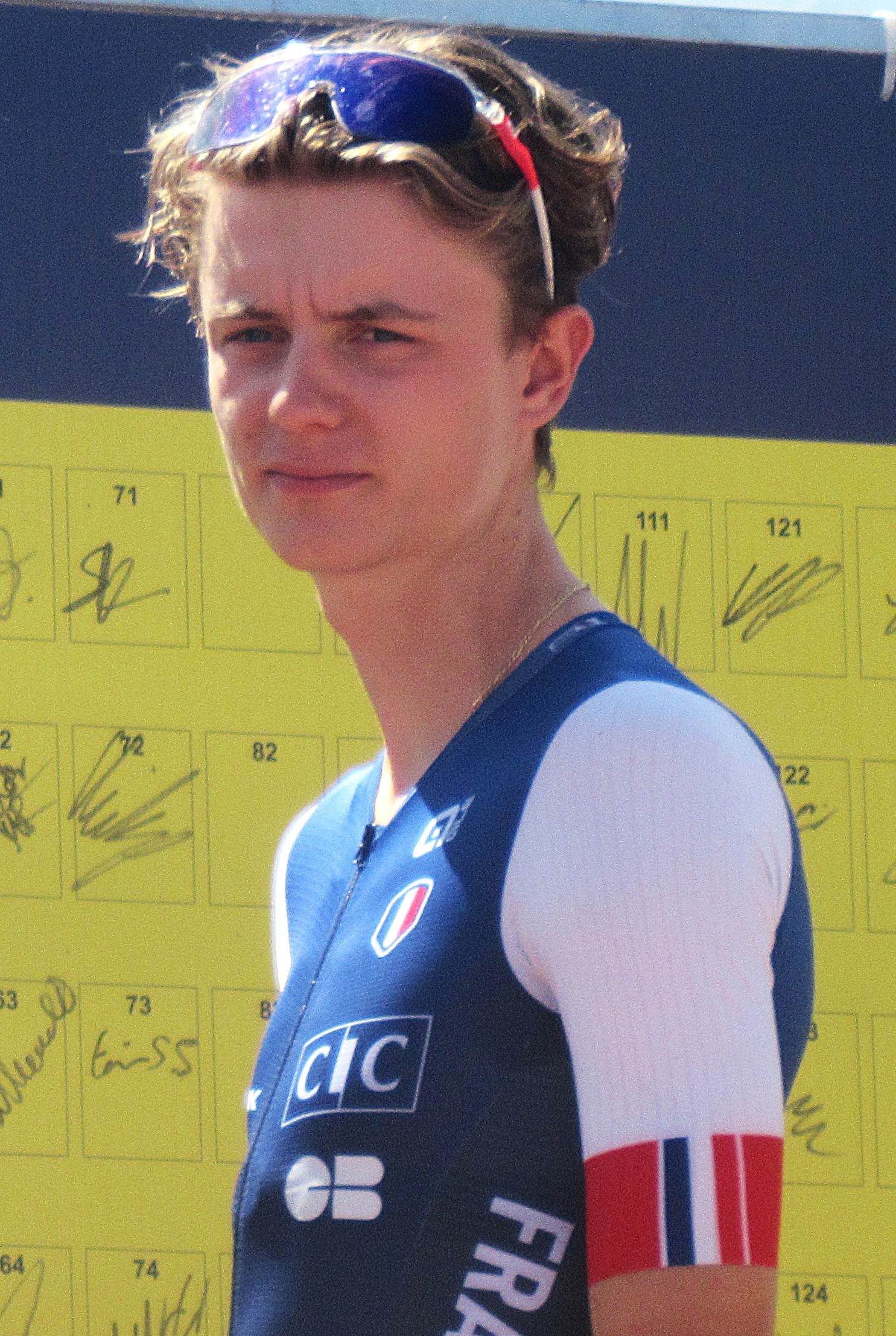
- Rolland in 2024

Personal information
- Born: 13 August 2003 (age 23) Rennes, France
- Height: 1.79 m (5 ft 10 in)
- Weight: 59 kg (130 lb)

Cycling career
- Sport: Cycling
- Current team: Groupama–FDJ United
- Discipline: Road
- Role: Rider
- Rider type: Climber

Amateur teams
- 2020–2021: UC Briochine
- 2022: Vendée U

Professional teams
- 2023–2024: Équipe Continentale Groupama–FDJ
- 2025–: Groupama–FDJ

Brieuc Rolland (born 13 August 2003) is a French cyclist, who currently rides for UCI WorldTeam Groupama–FDJ United.

== Major results ==
2021
5th Road race, National Junior Road Championships
4th Overall Saarland Trofeo
5th Overall Ronde des Vallées
6th Overall Giro della Lunigiana

1st Stage 1

2022
1st Redon-Redon
2nd Overall Trois Jours de Cherbourg

1st Stage 3

3rd Tour de Berne
5th Road race, National Under-23 Road Championships
2023
6th Overall Alpes Isère Tour
8th Overall Giro della Valle d'Aosta
2024
1st Overall Course de la Paix U23 – Grand Prix Jeseníky

1st Stage 3

1st Piccolo Giro di Lombardia
2nd Overall Orlen Nations Grand Prix
3rd Polynormande
5th Liège–Bastogne–Liège Espoirs
8th Overall Tour du Rwanda

=== Grand Tour general classification results timeline ===
Grand Tour	2025
Giro d'Italia	—
Tour de France	—
Vuelta a España	45
