= Valdeolmos-Alalpardo =

Coordinates: 40.6833°N 3.61667°W

- Municipality
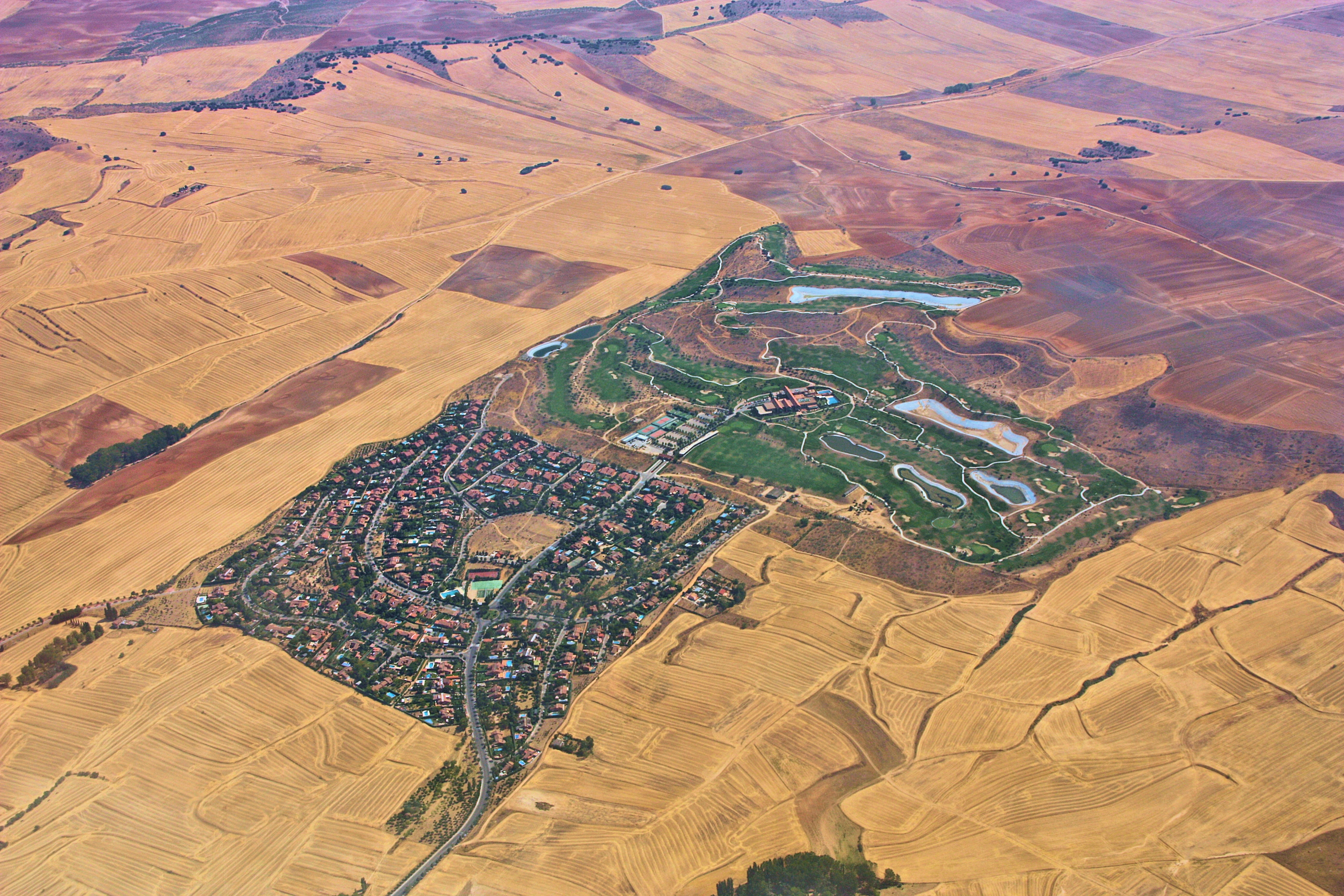
- Miraval neighborhood

- Flag Coat of arms

- Municipal location within the Community of Madrid.
- Country: Spain
- Autonomous community: Community of Madrid

Area
  - Total: 10.35 sq mi (26.81 km^{2})
- Elevation: 2,200 ft (670 m)

Population (2025-01-01)
  - Total: 4,626
  - Density: 446.9/sq mi (172.5/km^{2})
- Time zone: UTC+1 (CET)
  - Summer (DST): UTC+2 (CEST)

Valdeolmos-Alalpardo is a municipality of the Community of Madrid, Spain. It comprises three separate blocks: Valdeolmos, Alalpardo and Miraval.

Alalpardo is famous for a live Nativity scene in which more than 200 people create images of the birth of Christ. Shepherds, Roman soldiers, craftspeople, fishermen, merchants, and live mules, donkeys, horses, hens, geese, sheep, pigs, ducks, and falcons are gathered together every year for two days over Christmas to create more than 20 Nativity scenes.
