= 2022 EF Education–EasyPost season =

EF Education–EasyPost
- 2022 season
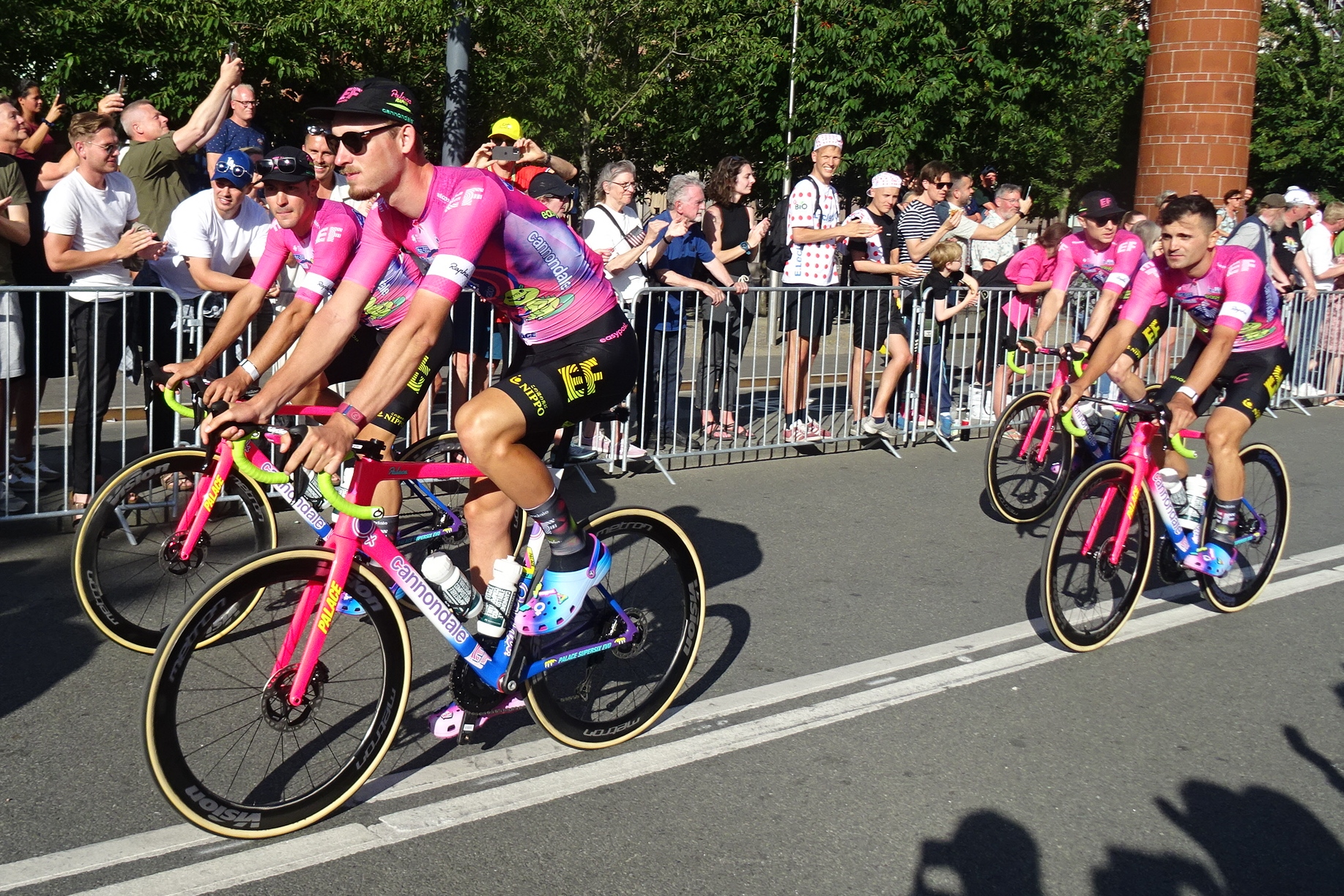
- EF Education-EasyPost at Tour de France team presentation
- UCI code: EFE
- Status: UCI WorldTeam
- Manager: Jonathan Vaughters (USA)
- Main sponsor(s): EF Education First; EasyPost
- Based: Boulder, Colorado, United States
- Bicycles: Cannondale
- Groupset: Shimano

Season victories
- Stage race stages: 3

The 2022 season for the EF Education–EasyPost team is its 14th season as a UCI WorldTeam and its 19th overall. International education company EF Education First continues as a co-title sponsor, while American shopping company EasyPost replaces Japanese construction company Nippo Corporation as the other co-title sponsor. However, Nippo will remain in the team's organization and be a co-title sponsor of the development team (EF Education–Nippo Development Team). They use Cannondale bicycles, Shimano drivetrain, Vision wheels and Rapha clothing.

== Team roster ==
As of January 11, 2022.

Rider	Date of birth
Daniel Arroyave (COL)	June 19, 2000 (aged 21)
Alberto Bettiol (ITA)	October 29, 1993 (aged 28)
Stefan Bissegger (SUI)	September 13, 1998 (aged 23)
Jonathan Caicedo (ECU)	April 28, 1993 (aged 28)
Diego Camargo (COL)	May 3, 1998 (aged 23)
Simon Carr (GBR)	August 29, 1998 (aged 23)
Hugh Carthy (GBR)	July 9, 1994 (aged 27)
Esteban Chaves (COL)	January 17, 1990 (aged 31)
Magnus Cort (DEN)	January 16, 1993 (aged 28)
Owain Doull (GBR)	May 2, 1993 (aged 28)
Odd Christian Eiking (NOR)	December 28, 1994 (aged 27)
Ruben Guerreiro (POR)	July 6, 1994 (aged 27)
Ben Healy (IRL)	September 11, 2000 (aged 21)
Alex Howes (USA)	January 1, 1988 (aged 34)
Jens Keukeleire (BEL)	November 23, 1988 (aged 33)
Merhawi Kudus (ERI)	January 23, 1994 (aged 27)

Rider	Date of birth
Sebastian Langeveld (NED)	January 17, 1985 (aged 36)
Lachlan Morton (AUS)	January 2, 1992 (aged 29)
Hideto Nakane (JPN)	May 2, 1990 (aged 31)
Mark Padun (UKR)	July 6, 1996 (aged 25)
Neilson Powless (USA)	September 3, 1996 (aged 25)
Sean Quinn (USA)	May 10, 2000 (aged 21)
Jonas Rutsch (GER)	January 24, 1998 (aged 23)
Tom Scully (NZL)	January 14, 1990 (aged 31)
James Shaw (GBR)	June 13, 1996 (aged 25)
Georg Steinhauser (GER)	October 21, 2001 (aged 20)
Rigoberto Urán (COL)	January 26, 1987 (aged 34)
Michael Valgren (DEN)	February 7, 1992 (aged 29)
Julius van den Berg (NED)	October 23, 1996 (aged 25)
Marijn van den Berg (NED)	July 19, 1999 (aged 22)
Łukasz Wiśniowski (POL)	December 7, 1991 (aged 30)

Riders who joined the team for the 2022 season

Rider	2021 team
Esteban Chaves	Team BikeExchange
Owain Doull	Ineos Grenadiers
Odd Christian Eiking	Intermarché–Wanty–Gobert Matériaux
Ben Healy	neo-pro (Trinity Racing)
Merhawi Kudus	Astana–Premier Tech
Mark Padun	Team Bahrain Victorious
Sean Quinn	neo-pro (Hagens Berman Axeon)
James Shaw	Ribble Weldtite
Georg Steinhauser	neo-pro (Tirol KTM Cycling Team)
Marijn van den Berg	neo-pro (Équipe Continentale Groupama–FDJ)
Łukasz Wiśniowski	Team Qhubeka NextHash

Riders who left the team during or after the 2021 season

Rider	2022 team
Will Barta	Movistar Team
Fumiyuki Beppu	Retired
Lawson Craddock	Team BikeExchange–Jayco
Mitchell Docker	Retired
Julien El Fares	Retired
Sergio Higuita	Bora–Hansgrohe
Moreno Hofland	Retired
Logan Owen	
Tejay van Garderen (Note: Van Garderen retired on June 20, 2021, following the conclusion of the United States National Road Race Championships.)	Retired
James Whelan	Team BridgeLane

== Season victories ==
Date	Race	Competition	Rider	Country	Location	Ref.
February 22	UAE Tour, Stage 3 (ITT)	UCI World Tour	Stefan Bissegger (SUI)	United Arab Emirates	Ajman (Al Zorah)	
February 24	O Gran Camiño, Stage 1	UCI Europe Tour	Magnus Cort (DEN)	Spain	Vigo	
February 27	O Gran Camiño, Stage 4 (ITT)	UCI Europe Tour	Mark Padun (UKR)	Spain	Sarria	

== National, Continental, and World Champions ==
Date	Discipline	Jersey	Rider	Country	Location	Ref.
