= 2021 Critérium du Dauphiné =

2021 UCI World Tour, race 19 of 29

Race details
- Dates: 30 May – 6 June 2021
- Stages: 8
- Distance: 1,205.3 km (748.9 mi)
- Winning time: 29h 37' 05"

Results
Jersey awarded to the overall winner	Winner	Richie Porte (AUS)	(INEOS Grenadiers)
	Second	Alexey Lutsenko (KAZ)	(Astana–Premier Tech)
	Third	Geraint Thomas (GBR)	(INEOS Grenadiers)
Jersey awarded to the points classification winner	Points	Sonny Colbrelli (ITA)	(Team Bahrain Victorious)
Jersey awarded to the mountains classification winner	Mountains	Mark Padun (UKR)	(Team Bahrain Victorious)
Jersey awarded to the young rider classification winner	Young rider	David Gaudu (FRA)	(Groupama–FDJ)
Jersey awarded to the team classification winner	Team	INEOS Grenadiers	

The 2021 Critérium du Dauphiné was the 73rd edition of the Critérium du Dauphiné, a road cycling stage race in the titular region of southeastern France. The race took place between 30 May and 6 June 2021.

== Teams ==
All nineteen UCI WorldTeams and two UCI ProTeams made up the twenty-one teams that participated in the race. Each team fielded a squad of seven riders, for a total of 147 riders, from which there were 118 finishers.

UCI WorldTeams

- AG2R Citroën Team
- Astana–Premier Tech
- Bora–Hansgrohe
- Cofidis
- Deceuninck–Quick-Step
- EF Education–Nippo
- Groupama–FDJ
- INEOS Grenadiers
- Intermarché–Wanty–Gobert Matériaux
- Israel Start-Up Nation
- Lotto–Soudal
- Movistar Team
- Team Bahrain Victorious
- Team BikeExchange
- Team DSM
- Team Jumbo–Visma
- Team Qhubeka Assos
- Trek–Segafredo
- UAE Team Emirates

UCI ProTeams

- Arkéa–Samsic
- B&B Hotels p/b KTM

== Route ==
On 22 February 2021, the race organisers, the Amaury Sport Organisation (ASO), announced the route at a presentation in Lyon.

Stage characteristics
Stage	Date	Course	Distance	Type	Winner
1	30 May	Issoire to Issoire	182 km (113 mi)	Flat stage	Brent Van Moer (BEL)
2	31 May	Brioude to Saugues	173 km (107 mi)	Hilly stage	Lukas Pöstlberger (AUT)
3	1 June	Langeac to Saint-Haon-le-Vieux	172.5 km (107.2 mi)	Flat stage	Sonny Colbrelli (ITA)
4	2 June	Firminy to Roche-la-Molière	16.4 km (10.2 mi)	Individual time trial	Alexey Lutsenko (KAZ)
5	3 June	Saint-Chamond to Saint-Vallier	175.4 km (109.0 mi)	Flat stage	Geraint Thomas (GBR)
6	4 June	Loriol-sur-Drôme to Le Sappey-en-Chartreuse	167.5 km (104.1 mi)	Hilly stage	Alejandro Valverde (ESP)
7	5 June	Saint-Martin-le-Vinoux to La Plagne	171.5 km (106.6 mi)	Mountain stage	Mark Padun (UKR)
8	6 June	La Léchère-les-Bains to Les Gets	147 km (91 mi)	Mountain stage	Mark Padun (UKR)
Total			1,205.3 km (748.9 mi)		

== Stages ==
=== Stage 1 ===
30 May 2021 — Issoire to Issoire, 182 km (113 mi)

Stage 1 Result
Rank	Rider	Team	Time
1	Brent Van Moer (BEL)	Lotto–Soudal	4h 13' 00"
2	Sonny Colbrelli (ITA)	Team Bahrain Victorious	+ 25"
3	Clément Venturini (FRA)	AG2R Citroën Team	+ 25"
4	Jasper Stuyven (BEL)	Trek–Segafredo	+ 25"
5	Kaden Groves (AUS)	Team BikeExchange	+ 25"
6	Nils Politt (GER)	Bora–Hansgrohe	+ 25"
7	Michał Kwiatkowski (POL)	INEOS Grenadiers	+ 25"
8	Kasper Asgreen (DEN)	Deceuninck–Quick-Step	+ 25"
9	Alex Aranburu (ESP)	Astana–Premier Tech	+ 25"
10	Alejandro Valverde (ESP)	Movistar Team	+ 25"

General classification after Stage 1
Rank	Rider	Team	Time
1	Brent Van Moer (BEL)	Lotto–Soudal	4h 12' 49"
2	Sonny Colbrelli (ITA)	Team Bahrain Victorious	+ 30"
3	Clément Venturini (FRA)	AG2R Citroën Team	+ 32"
4	Patrick Gamper (AUT)	Bora–Hansgrohe	+ 33"
5	Jasper Stuyven (BEL)	Trek–Segafredo	+ 36"
6	Kaden Groves (AUS)	Team BikeExchange	+ 36"
7	Nils Politt (GER)	Bora–Hansgrohe	+ 36"
8	Michał Kwiatkowski (POL)	INEOS Grenadiers	+ 36"
9	Kasper Asgreen (DEN)	Deceuninck–Quick-Step	+ 36"
10	Alex Aranburu (ESP)	Astana–Premier Tech	+ 36"

=== Stage 2 ===
31 May 2021 — Brioude to Saugues, 173 km (107 mi)

Stage 2 Result
Rank	Rider	Team	Time
1	Lukas Pöstlberger (AUT)	Bora–Hansgrohe	4h 25' 20"
2	Sonny Colbrelli (ITA)	Team Bahrain Victorious	+ 11"
3	Alejandro Valverde (ESP)	Movistar Team	+ 11"
4	Kasper Asgreen (DEN)	Deceuninck–Quick-Step	+ 11"
5	Sven Erik Bystrøm (NOR)	UAE Team Emirates	+ 11"
6	Patrick Konrad (AUT)	Bora–Hansgrohe	+ 11"
7	Ilan Van Wilder (BEL)	Team DSM	+ 11"
8	Greg Van Avermaet (BEL)	AG2R Citroën Team	+ 11"
9	Alex Aranburu (ESP)	Astana–Premier Tech	+ 11"
10	David Gaudu (FRA)	Groupama–FDJ	+ 11"

General classification after Stage 2
Rank	Rider	Team	Time
1	Lukas Pöstlberger (AUT)	Bora–Hansgrohe	8h 38' 32"
2	Sonny Colbrelli (ITA)	Team Bahrain Victorious	+ 12"
3	Alejandro Valverde (ESP)	Movistar Team	+ 20"
4	Kasper Asgreen (DEN)	Deceuninck–Quick-Step	+ 24"
5	Alex Aranburu (ESP)	Astana–Premier Tech	+ 24"
6	Patrick Konrad (AUT)	Bora–Hansgrohe	+ 24"
7	Michael Valgren (DEN)	EF Education–Nippo	+ 24"
8	Guillaume Martin (FRA)	Cofidis	+ 24"
9	Geraint Thomas (GBR)	INEOS Grenadiers	+ 24"
10	Ilan Van Wilder (BEL)	Team DSM	+ 24"

=== Stage 3 ===
1 June 2021 — Langeac to Saint-Haon-le-Vieux, 172.5 km (107.2 mi)

Stage 3 Result
Rank	Rider	Team	Time
1	Sonny Colbrelli (ITA)	Team Bahrain Victorious	3h 56' 36"
2	Alex Aranburu (ESP)	Astana–Premier Tech	+ 0"
3	Brandon McNulty (USA)	UAE Team Emirates	+ 0"
4	Jasper Stuyven (BEL)	Trek–Segafredo	+ 0"
5	Wilco Kelderman (NED)	Bora–Hansgrohe	+ 0"
6	Clément Venturini (FRA)	AG2R Citroën Team	+ 0"
7	Carlos Barbero (ESP)	Team Qhubeka Assos	+ 0"
8	Clément Russo (FRA)	Arkéa–Samsic	+ 0"
9	Tim Wellens (BEL)	Lotto–Soudal	+ 0"
10	Kasper Asgreen (DEN)	Deceuninck–Quick-Step	+ 0"

General classification after Stage 3
Rank	Rider	Team	Time
1	Lukas Pöstlberger (AUT)	Bora–Hansgrohe	12h 35' 08"
2	Sonny Colbrelli (ITA)	Team Bahrain Victorious	+ 2"
3	Alex Aranburu (ESP)	Astana–Premier Tech	+ 18"
4	Alejandro Valverde (ESP)	Movistar Team	+ 20"
5	Kasper Asgreen (DEN)	Deceuninck–Quick-Step	+ 23"
6	Quentin Pacher (FRA)	Cofidis	+ 24"
7	Patrick Konrad (AUT)	Bora–Hansgrohe	+ 24"
8	Geraint Thomas (GBR)	INEOS Grenadiers	+ 24"
9	Ilan Van Wilder (BEL)	Team DSM	+ 24"
10	Steven Kruijswijk (NED)	Team Jumbo–Visma	+ 24"

=== Stage 4 ===
2 June 2021 — Firminy to Roche-la-Molière, 16.4 km (10.2 mi) (ITT)

Stage 4 Result
Rank	Rider	Team	Time
1	Alexey Lutsenko (KAZ)	Astana–Premier Tech	21' 36"
2	Ion Izagirre (ESP)	Astana–Premier Tech	+ 8"
3	Kasper Asgreen (DEN)	Deceuninck–Quick-Step	+ 9"
4	Wilco Kelderman (NED)	Bora–Hansgrohe	+ 12"
5	Ilan Van Wilder (BEL)	Team DSM	+ 13"
6	Richie Porte (AUS)	INEOS Grenadiers	+ 15"
7	Jonas Vingegaard (DEN)	Team Jumbo–Visma	+ 17"
8	Brandon McNulty (USA)	UAE Team Emirates	+ 21"
9	Lukas Pöstlberger (AUT)	Bora–Hansgrohe	+ 23"
10	Geraint Thomas (GBR)	INEOS Grenadiers	+ 23"

General classification after Stage 4
Rank	Rider	Team	Time
1	Lukas Pöstlberger (AUT)	Bora–Hansgrohe	12h 57' 07"
2	Alexey Lutsenko (KAZ)	Astana–Premier Tech	+ 1"
3	Kasper Asgreen (DEN)	Deceuninck–Quick-Step	+ 9"
4	Ion Izagirre (ESP)	Astana–Premier Tech	+ 9"
5	Wilco Kelderman (NED)	Bora–Hansgrohe	+ 13"
6	Ilan Van Wilder (BEL)	Team DSM	+ 14"
7	Richie Porte (AUS)	INEOS Grenadiers	+ 16"
8	Geraint Thomas (GBR)	INEOS Grenadiers	+ 24"
9	Patrick Konrad (AUT)	Bora–Hansgrohe	+ 32"
10	Ben O'Connor (AUS)	AG2R Citroën Team	+ 34"

=== Stage 5 ===
3 June 2021 — Saint-Chamond to Saint-Vallier, 175.4 km (109.0 mi)

Stage 5 Result
Rank	Rider	Team	Time
1	Geraint Thomas (GBR)	INEOS Grenadiers	4h 02' 15"
2	Sonny Colbrelli (ITA)	Team Bahrain Victorious	+ 0"
3	Alex Aranburu (ESP)	Astana–Premier Tech	+ 0"
4	Carlos Barbero (ESP)	Team Qhubeka Assos	+ 0"
5	Mads Würtz Schmidt (DEN)	Israel Start-Up Nation	+ 0"
6	Michael Valgren (DEN)	EF Education–Nippo	+ 0"
7	Patrick Konrad (AUT)	Bora–Hansgrohe	+ 0"
8	Alejandro Valverde (ESP)	Movistar Team	+ 0"
9	Harry Sweeny (AUS)	Lotto–Soudal	+ 0"
10	Franck Bonnamour (FRA)	B&B Hotels p/b KTM	+ 0"

General classification after Stage 5
Rank	Rider	Team	Time
1	Lukas Pöstlberger (AUT)	Bora–Hansgrohe	16h 59' 22"
2	Alexey Lutsenko (KAZ)	Astana–Premier Tech	+ 1"
3	Kasper Asgreen (DEN)	Deceuninck–Quick-Step	+ 6"
4	Ion Izagirre (ESP)	Astana–Premier Tech	+ 9"
5	Wilco Kelderman (NED)	Bora–Hansgrohe	+ 13"
6	Geraint Thomas (GBR)	INEOS Grenadiers	+ 14"
7	Ilan Van Wilder (BEL)	Team DSM	+ 14"
8	Richie Porte (AUS)	INEOS Grenadiers	+ 16"
9	Patrick Konrad (AUT)	Bora–Hansgrohe	+ 32"
10	Ben O'Connor (AUS)	AG2R Citroën Team	+ 34"

=== Stage 6 ===
4 June 2021 — Loriol-sur-Drôme to Le Sappey-en-Chartreuse, 167.5 km (104.1 mi)

Stage 6 Result
Rank	Rider	Team	Time
1	Alejandro Valverde (ESP)	Movistar Team	3h 52' 53"
2	Tao Geoghegan Hart (GBR)	INEOS Grenadiers	+ 0"
3	Patrick Konrad (AUT)	Bora–Hansgrohe	+ 0"
4	Wilco Kelderman (NED)	Bora–Hansgrohe	+ 0"
5	Enric Mas (ESP)	Movistar Team	+ 0"
6	Sepp Kuss (USA)	Team Jumbo–Visma	+ 0"
7	Alexey Lutsenko (KAZ)	Astana–Premier Tech	+ 0"
8	Jack Haig (AUS)	Team Bahrain Victorious	+ 0"
9	Ben Hermans (BEL)	Israel Start-Up Nation	+ 0"
10	Steven Kruijswijk (NED)	Team Jumbo–Visma	+ 0"

General classification after Stage 6
Rank	Rider	Team	Time
1	Alexey Lutsenko (KAZ)	Astana–Premier Tech	20h 52' 16"
2	Ion Izagirre (ESP)	Astana–Premier Tech	+ 8"
3	Wilco Kelderman (NED)	Bora–Hansgrohe	+ 12"
4	Geraint Thomas (GBR)	INEOS Grenadiers	+ 13"
5	Ilan Van Wilder (BEL)	Team DSM	+ 13"
6	Richie Porte (AUS)	INEOS Grenadiers	+ 15"
7	Patrick Konrad (AUT)	Bora–Hansgrohe	+ 27"
8	Jack Haig (AUS)	Team Bahrain Victorious	+ 34"
9	Steven Kruijswijk (NED)	Team Jumbo–Visma	+ 39"
10	Miguel Ángel López (COL)	Movistar Team	+ 42"

=== Stage 7 ===
5 June 2021 — Saint-Martin-le-Vinoux to La Plagne, 171.5 km (106.6 mi)

Stage 7 Result
Rank	Rider	Team	Time
1	Mark Padun (UKR)	Team Bahrain Victorious	4h 35' 07"
2	Richie Porte (AUS)	INEOS Grenadiers	+ 34"
3	Miguel Ángel López (COL)	Movistar Team	+ 43"
4	Jack Haig (AUS)	Team Bahrain Victorious	+ 43"
5	Ben O'Connor (AUS)	AG2R Citroën Team	+ 47"
6	Sepp Kuss (USA)	Team Jumbo–Visma	+ 52"
7	David Gaudu (FRA)	Groupama–FDJ	+ 56"
8	Enric Mas (ESP)	Movistar Team	+ 56"
9	Geraint Thomas (GBR)	INEOS Grenadiers	+ 59"
10	Alexey Lutsenko (KAZ)	Astana–Premier Tech	+ 1' 00"

General classification after Stage 7
Rank	Rider	Team	Time
1	Richie Porte (AUS)	INEOS Grenadiers	25h 28' 06"
2	Alexey Lutsenko (KAZ)	Astana–Premier Tech	+ 17"
3	Geraint Thomas (GBR)	INEOS Grenadiers	+ 29"
4	Wilco Kelderman (NED)	Bora–Hansgrohe	+ 33"
5	Jack Haig (AUS)	Team Bahrain Victorious	+ 34"
6	Miguel Ángel López (COL)	Movistar Team	+ 38"
7	Ion Izagirre (ESP)	Astana–Premier Tech	+ 38"
8	Ben O'Connor (AUS)	AG2R Citroën Team	+ 1' 00"
9	David Gaudu (FRA)	Groupama–FDJ	+ 1' 12"
10	Aurélien Paret-Peintre (FRA)	AG2R Citroën Team	+ 1' 17"

=== Stage 8 ===
6 June 2021 — La Léchère-les-Bains to Les Gets, 147 km (91 mi)

Stage 8 Result
Rank	Rider	Team	Time
1	Mark Padun (UKR)	Team Bahrain Victorious	4h 06' 49"
2	Jonas Vingegaard (DEN)	Team Jumbo–Visma	+ 1' 36"
3	Patrick Konrad (AUT)	Bora–Hansgrohe	+ 1' 36"
4	Ben O'Connor (AUS)	AG2R Citroën Team	+ 1' 57"
5	David Gaudu (FRA)	Groupama–FDJ	+ 2' 10"
6	Geraint Thomas (GBR)	INEOS Grenadiers	+ 2' 10"
7	Alexey Lutsenko (KAZ)	Astana–Premier Tech	+ 2' 10"
8	Richie Porte (AUS)	INEOS Grenadiers	+ 2' 10"
9	Jack Haig (AUS)	Team Bahrain Victorious	+ 2' 10"
10	Guillaume Martin (FRA)	Cofidis	+ 2' 10"

General classification after Stage 8
Rank	Rider	Team	Time
1	Richie Porte (AUS)	INEOS Grenadiers	29h 37' 05"
2	Alexey Lutsenko (KAZ)	Astana–Premier Tech	+ 17"
3	Geraint Thomas (GBR)	INEOS Grenadiers	+ 29"
4	Wilco Kelderman (NED)	Bora–Hansgrohe	+ 33"
5	Jack Haig (AUS)	Team Bahrain Victorious	+ 34"
6	Miguel Ángel López (COL)	Movistar Team	+ 38"
7	Ion Izagirre (ESP)	Astana–Premier Tech	+ 38"
8	Ben O'Connor (AUS)	AG2R Citroën Team	+ 47"
9	David Gaudu (FRA)	Groupama–FDJ	+ 1' 12"
10	Tao Geoghegan Hart (GBR)	INEOS Grenadiers	+ 1' 57"

== Classification leadership table ==
Classification leadership by stage
Stage	Winner	General classification	Points classification	Mountains classification	Young rider classification	Team classification	Combativity award
1	Brent Van Moer	Brent Van Moer	Brent Van Moer	Brent Van Moer	Brent Van Moer	Lotto–Soudal	Brent Van Moer
2	Lukas Pöstlberger	Lukas Pöstlberger	Sonny Colbrelli	Matthew Holmes	Ilan Van Wilder	Bora–Hansgrohe	Lukas Pöstlberger
3	Sonny Colbrelli	Lukas Pöstlberger	Sonny Colbrelli	Matthew Holmes	Ilan Van Wilder	Bora–Hansgrohe	Loïc Vliegen
4	Alexey Lutsenko	Lukas Pöstlberger	Sonny Colbrelli	Matthew Holmes	Ilan Van Wilder	Bora–Hansgrohe	no award
5	Geraint Thomas	Lukas Pöstlberger	Sonny Colbrelli	Matthew Holmes	Ilan Van Wilder	Bora–Hansgrohe	Sven Erik Bystrøm
6	Alejandro Valverde	Alexey Lutsenko	Sonny Colbrelli	Matthew Holmes	Ilan Van Wilder	INEOS Grenadiers	Lawson Craddock
7	Mark Padun	Richie Porte	Sonny Colbrelli	Lawson Craddock	David Gaudu	INEOS Grenadiers	Pierre Rolland
8	Mark Padun	Richie Porte	Sonny Colbrelli	Mark Padun	David Gaudu	INEOS Grenadiers	Nils Politt
Final		Richie Porte	Sonny Colbrelli	Mark Padun	David Gaudu	INEOS Grenadiers	Not awarded

- On stage 2, Sonny Colbrelli, who was second in the points classification, wore the green jersey, because first placed Brent Van Moer wore the yellow jersey as the leader of the general classification. For the same reason, Cyril Gautier, who was second in the mountains classification, wore the blue polka-dot jersey, and Patrick Gamper, who was second in the young rider classification, wore the white jersey.

== Final classification standings ==
Legend
Denotes the winner of the general classification	Denotes the winner of the young rider classification
Denotes the winner of the points classification	Denotes the winner of the team classification
Denotes the winner of the mountains classification	Denotes the winner of the combativity award

=== General classification ===
Final general classification (1–10)
Rank	Rider	Team	Time
1	Richie Porte (AUS)	INEOS Grenadiers	29h 37' 05"
2	Alexey Lutsenko (KAZ)	Astana–Premier Tech	+ 17"
3	Geraint Thomas (GBR)	INEOS Grenadiers	+ 29"
4	Wilco Kelderman (NED)	Bora–Hansgrohe	+ 33"
5	Jack Haig (AUS)	Team Bahrain Victorious	+ 34"
6	Miguel Ángel López (COL)	Movistar Team	+ 38"
7	Ion Izagirre (ESP)	Astana–Premier Tech	+ 38"
8	Ben O'Connor (AUS)	AG2R Citroën Team	+ 47"
9	David Gaudu (FRA)	Groupama–FDJ	+ 1' 12"
10	Tao Geoghegan Hart (GBR)	INEOS Grenadiers	+ 1' 57"

=== Points classification ===
Final points classification (1–10)
Rank	Rider	Team	Points
1	Sonny Colbrelli (SLO)	Team Bahrain Victorious	91
2	Kasper Asgreen (DEN)	Deceuninck–Quick-Step	58
3	Alex Aranburu (ESP)	Astana–Premier Tech	58
4	Patrick Konrad (AUT)	Bora–Hansgrohe	56
5	Alejandro Valverde (ESP)	Movistar Team	51
6	Lukas Pöstlberger (AUT)	Bora–Hansgrohe	37
7	Jasper Stuyven (BEL)	Trek–Segafredo	36
8	Mark Padun (UKR)	Team Bahrain Victorious	34
9	Geraint Thomas (GBR)	INEOS Grenadiers	33
10	Wilco Kelderman (NED)	Bora–Hansgrohe	32

=== Mountains classification ===
Final mountains classification (1–10)
Rank	Rider	Team	Points
1	Mark Padun (UKR)	Team Bahrain Victorious	50
2	Lawson Craddock (USA)	EF Education–Nippo	33
3	Michael Valgren (DEN)	EF Education–Nippo	26
4	Matthew Holmes (GBR)	Lotto–Soudal	21
5	Jack Haig (AUS)	Team Bahrain Victorious	16
6	Richie Porte (AUS)	INEOS Grenadiers	15
7	Nils Politt (GER)	Bora–Hansgrohe	13
8	Lukas Pöstlberger (AUT)	Bora–Hansgrohe	12
9	Kenny Elissonde (FRA)	Trek–Segafredo	12
10	Martijn Tusveld (NED)	Team DSM	12

=== Young rider classification ===
Final young rider classification (1–10)
Rank	Rider	Team	Time
1	David Gaudu (FRA)	Groupama–FDJ	29h 38' 17"
2	Aurélien Paret-Peintre (FRA)	AG2R Citroën Team	+ 1' 59"
3	Mattias Skjelmose (DEN)	Trek–Segafredo	+ 5' 44"
4	Felix Gall (AUT)	Team DSM	+ 7' 43"
5	Jaakko Hänninen (FIN)	AG2R Citroën Team	+ 25' 15"
6	Carlos Rodríguez (ESP)	INEOS Grenadiers	+ 26' 04"
7	Valentin Madouas (FRA)	Groupama–FDJ	+ 26' 49"
8	Mark Padun (UKR)	Team Bahrain Victorious	+ 27' 29"
9	Sylvain Moniquet (BEL)	Lotto–Soudal	+ 28' 07"
10	Brandon McNulty (USA)	UAE Team Emirates	+ 32' 23"

=== Team classification ===
Final team classification (1–10)
Rank	Team	Time
1	(United Kingdom) INEOS Grenadiers	88h 53' 28"
2	(Spain) Movistar Team	+ 4' 09"
3	Team Bahrain Victorious	+ 14' 04"
4	(France) AG2R Citroën Team	+ 21' 32"
5	(Netherlands) Team Jumbo–Visma	+ 27' 20"
6	(Kazakhstan) Astana–Premier Tech	+ 29' 30"
7	(Germany) Bora–Hansgrohe	+ 43' 13"
8	(France) Groupama–FDJ	+ 46' 18"
9	(Germany) Team DSM	+ 51' 39"
10	(United States) Trek–Segafredo	+ 53' 46"
