= 2022 Tour des Alpes-Maritimes et du Var =

2022 UCI Europe Tour

Race details
- Dates: 18–20 February 2022
- Stages: 3
- Distance: 438.04 km (272.2 mi)
- Winning time: 10h 56' 01"

Results
Jersey awarded to the overall winner	Winner	Nairo Quintana (COL)	(Arkéa–Samsic)
	Second	Tim Wellens (BEL)	(Lotto–Soudal)
	Third	Guillaume Martin (FRA)	(Cofidis)
Jersey awarded to the points classification winner	Points	Nairo Quintana (COL)	(Arkéa–Samsic)
Jersey awarded to the mountains classification winner	Mountains	Nairo Quintana (COL)	(Arkéa–Samsic)
Jersey awarded to the youth classification winner	Youth	Andreas Kron (DEN)	(Lotto–Soudal)
	Team	Groupama–FDJ	

The 2022 Tour des Alpes-Maritimes et du Var was a road cycling stage race that took place between 18 and 20 February 2022 in the departments of Alpes-Maritimes and Var in southeastern France. The race was rated as a category 2.1 event on the 2022 UCI Europe Tour calendar, and was the 54th edition of the Tour des Alpes-Maritimes et du Var.

== Teams ==
Seven of the 18 UCI WorldTeams, six UCI ProTeams, and three UCI Continental teams made up the 18 teams that participated in the race. 11 teams entered a full squad of seven riders each, and six teams entered six riders each, while Trek–Segafredo was the only team to enter five riders. There was one non-starter, which reduced Go Sport–Roubaix–Lille Métropole to six riders, so a total of 117 riders started the race. Of these riders, 96 finished.

UCI WorldTeams

- AG2R Citroën Team
- Cofidis
- EF Education–EasyPost
- Groupama–FDJ
- Lotto–Soudal
- Team DSM
- Trek–Segafredo

UCI ProTeams

- Arkéa–Samsic
- B&B Hotels–KTM
- Bingoal Pauwels Sauces WB
- Equipo Kern Pharma
- Team TotalEnergies
- Uno-X Pro Cycling Team

UCI Continental Teams

- Go Sport–Roubaix–Lille Métropole
- Nice Métropole Côte d'Azur
- Riwal Cycling Team
- St. Michel–Auber93
- Team UC Nantes Atlantique

== Route ==
Stage characteristics and winners
Stage	Date	Course	Distance	Type	Stage winner
1	18 February	Saint-Raphaël to La Seyne-sur-Mer	176.3 km (109.5 mi)	Hilly stage	Caleb Ewan (AUS)
2	19 February	Puget-Théniers to La Turbie	149.13 km (92.67 mi)	Mountain stage	Tim Wellens (BEL)
3	20 February	Villefranche-sur-Mer to Blausasc	112.61 km (69.97 mi)	Mountain stage	Nairo Quintana (COL)
Total			438.04 km (272.19 mi)		

== Stages ==
=== Stage 1 ===
18 February 2022 – Saint-Raphaël to La Seyne-sur-Mer, 176.3 km (109.5 mi)

Stage 1 Result (1–10)
Rank	Rider	Team	Time
1	Caleb Ewan (AUS)	Lotto–Soudal	4h 14' 44"
2	Anthony Turgis (FRA)	Team TotalEnergies	+ 0"
3	Nacer Bouhanni (FRA)	Arkéa–Samsic	+ 0"
4	Andrea Vendrame (ITA)	AG2R Citroën Team	+ 0"
5	Alex Kirsch (LUX)	Trek–Segafredo	+ 0"
6	Kévin Geniets (LUX)	Groupama–FDJ	+ 0"
7	Anthony Maldonado (FRA)	St. Michel–Auber93	+ 0"
8	Alexis Renard (FRA)	Cofidis	+ 0"
9	James Shaw (GBR)	EF Education–EasyPost	+ 0"
10	Damien Touzé (FRA)	AG2R Citroën Team	+ 0"

General classification after Stage 1 (1–10)
Rank	Rider	Team	Time
1	Caleb Ewan (AUS)	Lotto–Soudal	4h 14' 44"
2	Anthony Turgis (FRA)	Team TotalEnergies	+ 0"
3	Nacer Bouhanni (FRA)	Arkéa–Samsic	+ 0"
4	Andrea Vendrame (ITA)	AG2R Citroën Team	+ 0"
5	Alex Kirsch (LUX)	Trek–Segafredo	+ 0"
6	Kévin Geniets (LUX)	Groupama–FDJ	+ 0"
7	Anthony Maldonado (FRA)	St. Michel–Auber93	+ 0"
8	Alexis Renard (FRA)	Cofidis	+ 0"
9	James Shaw (GBR)	EF Education–EasyPost	+ 0"
10	Damien Touzé (FRA)	AG2R Citroën Team	+ 0"

=== Stage 2 ===
19 February 2022 – Puget-Théniers to La Turbie, 149.13 km (92.67 mi)

Stage 2 Result (1–10)
Rank	Rider	Team	Time
1	Tim Wellens (BEL)	Lotto–Soudal	3h 46' 00"
2	Nairo Quintana (COL)	Arkéa–Samsic	+ 0"
3	Valentin Madouas (FRA)	Groupama–FDJ	+ 25"
4	Bauke Mollema (NED)	Trek–Segafredo	+ 27"
5	Guillaume Martin (FRA)	Cofidis	+ 27"
6	Amanuel Ghebreigzabhier (ERI)	Trek–Segafredo	+ 30"
7	Andreas Kron (DEN)	Lotto–Soudal	+ 1' 27"
8	Alexis Vuillermoz (FRA)	Team TotalEnergies	+ 1' 27"
9	James Shaw (GBR)	EF Education–EasyPost	+ 1' 31"
10	Mathias Bregnhøj (DEN)	Riwal Cycling Team	+ 1' 33"

General classification after Stage 2 (1–10)
Rank	Rider	Team	Time
1	Tim Wellens (BEL)	Lotto–Soudal	8h 00' 44"
2	Nairo Quintana (COL)	Arkéa–Samsic	+ 0"
3	Valentin Madouas (FRA)	Groupama–FDJ	+ 25"
4	Bauke Mollema (NED)	Trek–Segafredo	+ 27"
5	Guillaume Martin (FRA)	Cofidis	+ 27"
6	Amanuel Ghebreigzabhier (ERI)	Trek–Segafredo	+ 30"
7	Andreas Kron (DEN)	Lotto–Soudal	+ 1' 27"
8	Alexis Vuillermoz (FRA)	Team TotalEnergies	+ 1' 27"
9	James Shaw (GBR)	EF Education–EasyPost	+ 1' 31"
10	Kévin Geniets (LUX)	Groupama–FDJ	+ 1' 33"

=== Stage 3 ===
20 February 2022 – Villefranche-sur-Mer to Blausasc, 112.61 km (69.97 mi)

Stage 3 Result (1–10)
Rank	Rider	Team	Time
1	Nairo Quintana (COL)	Arkéa–Samsic	2h 55' 17"
2	Guillaume Martin (FRA)	Cofidis	+ 1' 21"
3	Thibaut Pinot (FRA)	Groupama–FDJ	+ 1' 30"
4	Alexis Vuillermoz (FRA)	Team TotalEnergies	+ 1' 30"
5	Tim Wellens (BEL)	Lotto–Soudal	+ 1' 30"
6	Michael Storer (AUS)	Groupama–FDJ	+ 1' 37"
7	Andrea Vendrame (ITA)	AG2R Citroën Team	+ 2' 25"
8	Aurélien Paret-Peintre (FRA)	AG2R Citroën Team	+ 2' 25"
9	Rémy Mertz (BEL)	Bingoal Pauwels Sauces WB	+ 2' 25"
10	Romain Combaud (FRA)	Team DSM	+ 2' 25"

General classification after Stage 3 (1–10)
Rank	Rider	Team	Time
1	Nairo Quintana (COL)	Arkéa–Samsic	10h 56' 01"
2	Tim Wellens (BEL)	Lotto–Soudal	+ 1' 30"
3	Guillaume Martin (FRA)	Cofidis	+ 1' 48"
4	Valentin Madouas (FRA)	Groupama–FDJ	+ 2' 50"
5	Bauke Mollema (NED)	Trek–Segafredo	+ 2' 52"
6	Amanuel Ghebreigzabhier (ERI)	Trek–Segafredo	+ 2' 55"
7	Alexis Vuillermoz (FRA)	Team TotalEnergies	+ 2' 57"
8	Andreas Kron (DEN)	Lotto–Soudal	+ 3' 52"
9	James Shaw (GBR)	EF Education–EasyPost	+ 3' 56"
10	Kévin Geniets (LUX)	Groupama–FDJ	+ 3' 58"

== Classification leadership table ==
Classification leadership by stage
Stage	Winner	General classification	Points classification	Mountains classification	Young rider classification	Team classification	Combativity award
1	Caleb Ewan	Caleb Ewan	Caleb Ewan	Tristan Delacroix	Alexis Renard	Lotto–Soudal	Maël Guégan
2	Tim Wellens	Tim Wellens	Tim Wellens	Jonathan Couanon	Andreas Kron	AG2R Citroën Team	Nairo Quintana
3	Nairo Quintana	Nairo Quintana	Nairo Quintana	Nairo Quintana	Andreas Kron	Groupama–FDJ	Thibaut Pinot
Final		Nairo Quintana	Nairo Quintana	Nairo Quintana	Andreas Kron	Groupama–FDJ	Not awarded

- On stage 2, Anthony Turgis, who was second in the points classification, wore the green jersey, because first-placed Caleb Ewan wore the yellow jersey as the leader of the general classification. On stage 3, Ewan wore the green jersey in place of Tim Wellens, who took over the lead in both classifications.

== Final classification standings ==
Legend
Denotes the winner of the general classification	Denotes the winner of the mountains classification
Denotes the winner of the points classification	Denotes the winner of the young rider classification

=== General classification ===
Final general classification (1–10)
Rank	Rider	Team	Time
1	Nairo Quintana (COL)	Arkéa–Samsic	10h 56' 01"
2	Tim Wellens (BEL)	Lotto–Soudal	+ 1' 30"
3	Guillaume Martin (FRA)	Cofidis	+ 1' 48"
4	Valentin Madouas (FRA)	Groupama–FDJ	+ 2' 50"
5	Bauke Mollema (NED)	Trek–Segafredo	+ 2' 52"
6	Amanuel Ghebreigzabhier (ERI)	Trek–Segafredo	+ 2' 55"
7	Alexis Vuillermoz (FRA)	Team TotalEnergies	+ 2' 57"
8	Andreas Kron (DEN)	Lotto–Soudal	+ 3' 52"
9	James Shaw (GBR)	EF Education–EasyPost	+ 3' 56"
10	Kévin Geniets (LUX)	Groupama–FDJ	+ 3' 58"

=== Points classification ===
Final points classification (1–10)
Rank	Rider	Team	Points
1	Nairo Quintana (COL)	Arkéa–Samsic	45
2	Tim Wellens (BEL)	Lotto–Soudal	41
3	Guillaume Martin (FRA)	Cofidis	32
4	Andrea Vendrame (ITA)	AG2R Citroën Team	23
5	Alexis Vuillermoz (FRA)	Team TotalEnergies	22
6	Anthony Turgis (FRA)	Team TotalEnergies	20
7	Bauke Mollema (NED)	Trek–Segafredo	17
8	Valentin Madouas (FRA)	Groupama–FDJ	16
9	Thibaut Pinot (FRA)	Groupama–FDJ	16
10	Nacer Bouhanni (FRA)	Arkéa–Samsic	16

=== Mountains classification ===
Final mountains classification (1–10)
Rank	Rider	Team	Points
1	Nairo Quintana (COL)	Arkéa–Samsic	18
2	Thibaut Pinot (FRA)	Groupama–FDJ	16
3	Jonathan Couanon (FRA)	Nice Métropole Côte d'Azur	14
4	Lilian Calmejane (FRA)	AG2R Citroën Team	14
5	Roger Adrià (ESP)	Equipo Kern Pharma	10
6	Tristan Delacroix (FRA)	Nice Métropole Côte d'Azur	10
7	Tim Wellens (BEL)	Lotto–Soudal	10
8	Guillaume Martin (FRA)	Cofidis	10
9	Michael Storer (AUS)	Groupama–FDJ	10
10	Evaldas Šiškevičius (LTU)	Go Sport–Roubaix–Lille Métropole	8

=== Young rider classification ===
Final young rider classification (1–10)
Rank	Rider	Team	Time
1	Andreas Kron (DEN)	Lotto–Soudal	10h 59' 53"
2	Mark Donovan (GBR)	Team DSM	+ 19"
3	Andréa Mifsud (FRA)	Nice Métropole Côte d'Azur	+ 1' 44"
4	Roger Adrià (ESP)	Equipo Kern Pharma	+ 3' 09"
5	Valentin Ferron (FRA)	Team TotalEnergies	+ 7' 03"
6	Maxime Chevalier (FRA)	B&B Hotels–KTM	+ 10' 22"
7	Joris Delbove (FRA)	St. Michel–Auber93	+ 13' 48"
8	Louis Barré (FRA)	Team UC Nantes Atlantique	+ 15' 09"
9	Eugenio Sánchez (ESP)	Equipo Kern Pharma	+ 16' 26"
10	Maxime Jarnet (FRA)	Go Sport–Roubaix–Lille Métropole	+ 17' 27"

=== Team classification ===
Final team classification (1–10)
Rank	Team	Time
1	Groupama–FDJ	33h 02' 30"
2	AG2R Citroën Team	+ 30"
3	Arkéa–Samsic	+ 2' 56"
4	Team DSM	+ 3' 04"
5	Team TotalEnergies	+ 8' 39"
6	Trek–Segafredo	+ 8' 59"
7	Uno-X Pro Cycling Team	+ 10' 27"
8	B&B Hotels–KTM	+ 14' 48"
9	Lotto–Soudal	+ 14' 49"
10	Cofidis	+ 18' 27"
