= Walter Calzoni =

Italian cyclist

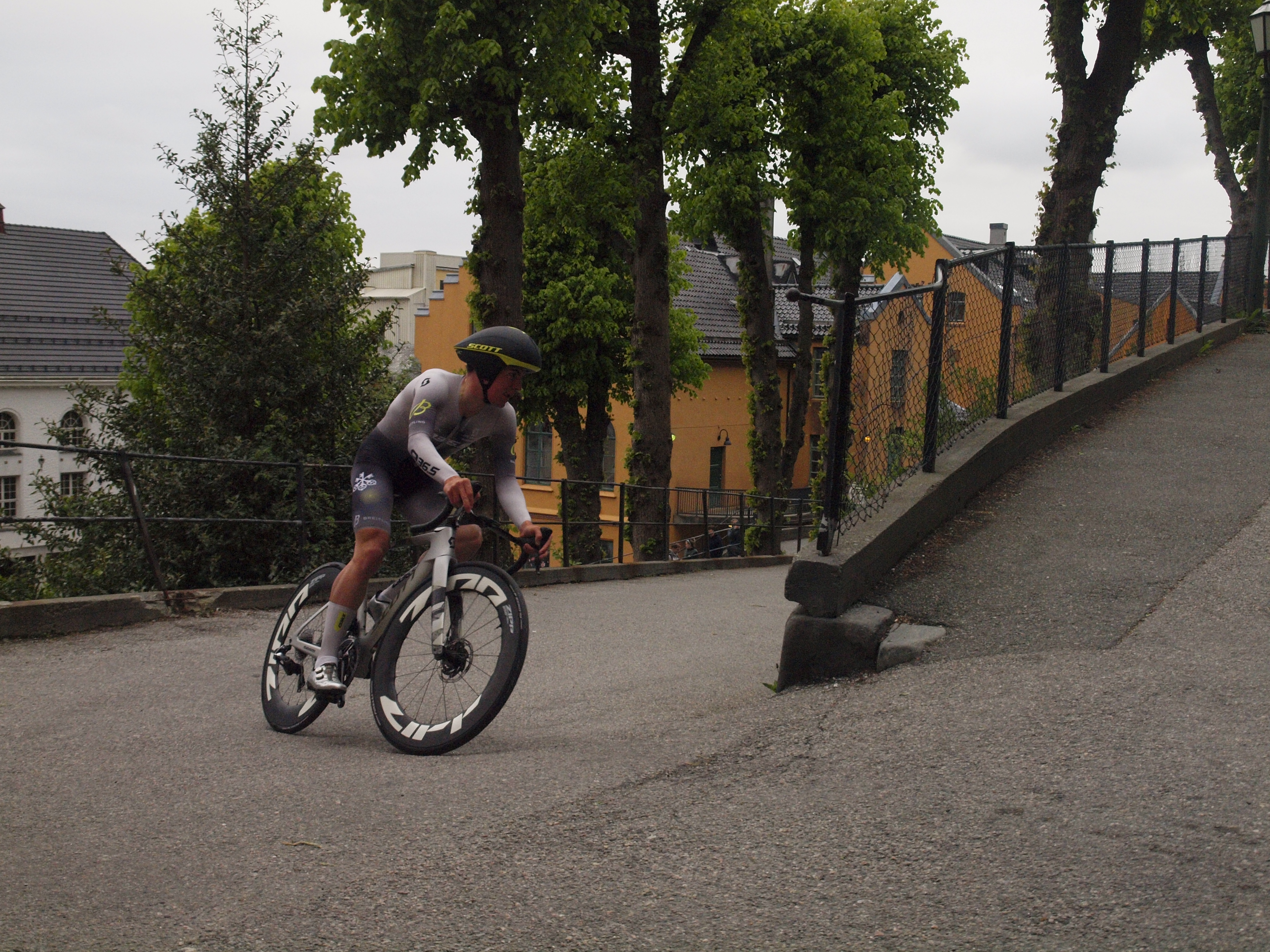
- Calzoni at the 2023 Tour of Norway

Personal information
- Born: 8 August 2001 (age 25) Brescia, Italy
- Height: 1.72 m (5 ft 8 in)

Cycling career
- Sport: Cycling
- Current team: Pinarello–Q36.5 Pro Cycling Team
- Discipline: Road
- Role: Rider

Amateur teams
- 2019: G.S. Massi Supermercati
- 2020–2021: Delio Gallina Colosio

Professional teams
- 2022: Gallina Ecotek Lucchini
- 2023–: Q36.5 Pro Cycling Team

Walter Calzoni (born 8 August 2001) is an Italian racing cyclist, who currently rides for UCI ProTeam Pinarello–Q36.5 Pro Cycling Team.

== Major results ==
2019
1st Giro della Castellania
2021
6th GP Hungary
8th GP Czech Republic
10th GP Capodarco
2022
1st Youth rider classification, Belgrade–Banja Luka
1st Bassano–Monte Grappa
2nd Road race, National Under-23 Road Championships
3rd Coppa della Pace
5th Overall Tour of Malopolska

1st Youth rider classification
1st Stage 1

8th GP Vipava Valley & Crossborder Goriška
2023
2nd Overall Tour du Rwanda

1st Youth rider classification

6th Coppa Sabatini
8th Per sempre Alfredo
8th Memorial Marco Pantani
9th Overall Settimana Internazionale di Coppi e Bartali
