= 2023 Settimana Internazionale di Coppi e Bartali =

Italian cycling race

2023 UCI Europe Tour

Race details
- Dates: 21–25 March 2023
- Stages: 5
- Distance: 661.0 km (410.7 mi)

Results
Jersey awarded to the overall winner	Winner	Mauro Schmid (SUI)	(Soudal–Quick-Step)
	Second	James Shaw (GBR)	(EF Education–EasyPost)
	Third	Ben Healy (IRL)	(EF Education–EasyPost)
Jersey awarded to the points classification winner	Points	Mauro Schmid (SUI)	(Soudal–Quick-Step)
Jersey awarded to the mountains classification winner	Mountains	Alexis Guérin (FRA)	(Bingoal WB)
Jersey awarded to the youth classification winner	Youth	Ben Healy (IRL)	(EF Education–EasyPost)
	Team	EF Education–EasyPost	

The 2023 Settimana Internazionale di Coppi e Bartali was a road cycling stage race that will take place between 21 and 25 March 2023 in the Italian region of Emilia-Romagna and in San Marino. The race is rated as a category 2.1 event on the 2023 UCI Europe Tour calendar, and is the 38th edition of the Settimana Internazionale di Coppi e Bartali.

== Teams ==
Eight of the 18 UCI WorldTeams, eight UCI ProTeams, and seven UCI Continental teams made up the 23 teams that participated in the race. Of these teams, 17 entered a full squad of seven riders. Four teams (Ineos Grenadiers, Israel–Premier Tech, Bora–Hansgrohe, and Team Jumbo–Visma) each entered six riders and two teams (Team Jayco–AlUla and Trek–Segafredo) each entered five riders.

UCI WorldTeams

- Astana Qazaqstan Team
- Bora–Hansgrohe
- EF Education–EasyPost
- Ineos Grenadiers
- Soudal–Quick-Step
- Team Jayco–AlUla
- Team Jumbo–Visma
- Trek–Segafredo

UCI ProTeams

- Bolton Equities Black Spoke
- Bingoal WB
- Eolo–Kometa
- Green Project–Bardiani–CSF–Faizanè
- Israel–Premier Tech
- Q36.5 Pro Cycling Team
- Team Corratec
- Tudor Pro Cycling Team

UCI Continental Teams

- Beltrami TSA–Tre Colli
- General Store–Essegibi–Fratelli Curia
- Giotti Victoria–Savini Due
- GW Shimano–Sidermec
- MG.K vis Colors for Peace VPM
- Work Service–Vitalcare–Vega
- Team Technipes #inEmiliaRomagna

== Route ==
Stage characteristics and winners
Stage	Date	Course	Distance	Type	Winner
1	21 March	Riccione to Riccione	161.8 km (100.5 mi)	Hilly stage	Rémi Cavagna (FRA)
2	22 March	Riccione to Longiano	172.5 km (107.2 mi)	Hilly stage	Sean Quinn (USA)
3	23 March	Forlì to Forlì	139.8 km (86.9 mi)	Mountain stage	Ben Healy (IRL)
4	24 March	Fiorano Modenese to Fiorano Modenese	168.7 km (104.8 mi)	Hilly stage	Alexis Guérin (FRA)
5	25 March	Carpi to Carpi	18.6 km (11.6 mi)	Individual time trial	Rémi Cavagna (FRA)
Total			651.4 km (404.8 mi)		

== Stages ==
=== Stage 1 ===
21 March 2023 — Riccione to Riccione, 161.8 km (100.5 mi)

Stage 1 Result (1–10)
Rank	Rider	Team	Time
1	Rémi Cavagna (FRA)	Soudal–Quick-Step	4h 03' 03"
2	Mauro Schmid (SUI)	Soudal–Quick-Step	+ 32"
3	Rick Pluimers (NED)	Tudor Pro Cycling Team	+ 32"
4	Loe van Belle (NED)	Team Jumbo–Visma	+ 32"
5	Natnael Tesfatsion (ERI)	Trek–Segafredo	+ 32"
6	Christian Scaroni (ITA)	Astana Qazaqstan Team	+ 32"
7	Davide Gabburo (ITA)	Green Project–Bardiani–CSF–Faizanè	+ 32"
8	Walter Calzoni (ITA)	Q36.5 Pro Cycling Team	+ 32"
9	Milan Vader (NED)	Team Jumbo–Visma	+ 32"
10	Luc Wirtgen (LUX)	Tudor Pro Cycling Team	+ 32"

General classification after Stage 1 (1–10)
Rank	Rider	Team	Time
1	Rémi Cavagna (FRA)	Soudal–Quick-Step	4h 02' 53"
2	Mauro Schmid (SUI)	Soudal–Quick-Step	+ 36"
3	Rick Pluimers (NED)	Tudor Pro Cycling Team	+ 38"
4	Loe van Belle (NED)	Team Jumbo–Visma	+ 42"
5	Natnael Tesfatsion (ERI)	Trek–Segafredo	+ 42"
6	Christian Scaroni (ITA)	Astana Qazaqstan Team	+ 42"
7	Davide Gabburo (ITA)	Green Project–Bardiani–CSF–Faizanè	+ 42"
8	Walter Calzoni (ITA)	Q36.5 Pro Cycling Team	+ 42"
9	Milan Vader (NED)	Team Jumbo–Visma	+ 42"
10	Luc Wirtgen (LUX)	Tudor Pro Cycling Team	+ 42"

=== Stage 2 ===
22 March 2023 — Riccione to Longiano, 172.5 km (107.2 mi)

Stage 2 Result (1–10)
Rank	Rider	Team	Time
1	Sean Quinn (USA)	EF Education–EasyPost	4h 18' 42"
2	Mauro Schmid (SUI)	Soudal–Quick-Step	+ 0"
3	Walter Calzoni (ITA)	Q36.5 Pro Cycling Team	+ 0"
4	James Shaw (GBR)	EF Education–EasyPost	+ 0"
5	Gianluca Brambilla (ITA)	Q36.5 Pro Cycling Team	+ 3"
6	Thomas Gloag (GBR)	Team Jumbo–Visma	+ 13"
7	Florian Lipowitz (GER)	Bora–Hansgrohe	+ 24"
8	Mark Padun (UKR)	EF Education–EasyPost	+ 34"
9	James Knox (GBR)	Soudal–Quick-Step	+ 34"
10	Domenico Pozzovivo (ITA)	Israel–Premier Tech	+ 56"

General classification after Stage 2 (1–10)
Rank	Rider	Team	Time
1	Mauro Schmid (SUI)	Soudal–Quick-Step	8h 22' 05"
2	Sean Quinn (USA)	EF Education–EasyPost	+ 2"
3	Walter Calzoni (ITA)	Q36.5 Pro Cycling Team	+ 8"
4	James Shaw (GBR)	EF Education–EasyPost	+ 12"
5	Gianluca Brambilla (ITA)	Q36.5 Pro Cycling Team	+ 15"
6	Mark Padun (UKR)	EF Education–EasyPost	+ 1' 05"
7	James Knox (GBR)	Soudal–Quick-Step	+ 1' 08"
8	Domenico Pozzovivo (ITA)	Israel–Premier Tech	+ 1' 08"
9	Stefan de Bod (RSA)	EF Education–EasyPost	+ 1' 08"
10	Christian Scaroni (ITA)	Astana Qazaqstan Team	+ 1' 10"

=== Stage 3 ===
23 March 2023 — Forlì to Forlì, 139.8 km (86.9 mi)

Stage 3 Result (1–10)
Rank	Rider	Team	Time
1	Ben Healy (IRL)	EF Education–EasyPost	4h 18' 42"
2	Domenico Pozzovivo (ITA)	Israel–Premier Tech	+ 0"
3	Mark Padun (UKR)	EF Education–EasyPost	+ 0"
4	Johannes Staune-Mittet (NOR)	Team Jumbo–Visma	+ 0"
5	Luca Covili (ITA)	Green Project–Bardiani–CSF–Faizanè	+ 3"
6	Floris De Tier (BEL)	Bingoal WB	+ 13"
7	Fernando Tercero (ESP)	Eolo–Kometa	+ 24"
8	Walter Calzoni (ITA)	Q36.5 Pro Cycling Team	+ 34"
9	Felix Engelhardt (GER)	Team Jayco–AlUla	+ 34"
10	Tijmen Graat (NED)	Team Jumbo–Visma	+ 56"

General classification after Stage 3 (1–10)
Rank	Rider	Team	Time
1	Mauro Schmid (SUI)	Soudal–Quick-Step	11h 51' 36"
2	Walter Calzoni (ITA)	Q36.5 Pro Cycling Team	+ 8"
3	James Shaw (GBR)	EF Education–EasyPost	+ 12"
4	Gianluca Brambilla (ITA)	Q36.5 Pro Cycling Team	+ 15"
5	Mark Padun (UKR)	EF Education–EasyPost	+ 36"
6	Domenico Pozzovivo (ITA)	Israel–Premier Tech	+ 37"
7	Ben Healy (IRL)	EF Education–EasyPost	+ 38"
8	Sean Quinn (USA)	EF Education–EasyPost	+ 57"
9	Natnael Tesfatsion (ERI)	Trek–Segafredo	+ 1' 10"
10	Felix Engelhardt (GER)	Team Jayco–AlUla	+ 1' 13"

=== Stage 4 ===
24 March 2023 — Fiorano Modenese to Fiorano Modenese, 168.6 km (104.8 mi)

Stage 4 Result (1–10)
Rank	Rider	Team	Time
1	Alexis Guérin (FRA)	Bingoal WB	4h 05' 29"
2	Mauro Schmid (SUI)	Soudal–Quick-Step	+ 3"
3	James Shaw (GBR)	EF Education–EasyPost	+ 3"
4	Johannes Staune-Mittet (NOR)	Team Jumbo–Visma	+ 3"
5	Domenico Pozzovivo (ITA)	Israel–Premier Tech	+ 3"
6	Ben Healy (IRL)	EF Education–EasyPost	+ 3"
7	Felix Engelhardt (GER)	Team Jayco–AlUla	+ 17"
8	Mark Stewart (GBR)	Bolton Equities Black Spoke	+ 17"
9	Davide Gabburo (ITA)	Green Project–Bardiani–CSF–Faizanè	+ 17"
10	Natnael Tesfatsion (ERI)	Trek–Segafredo	+ 17"

General classification after Stage 4 (1–10)
Rank	Rider	Team	Time
1	Mauro Schmid (SUI)	Soudal–Quick-Step	15h 57' 02"
2	James Shaw (GBR)	EF Education–EasyPost	+ 14"
3	Walter Calzoni (ITA)	Q36.5 Pro Cycling Team	+ 28"
4	Gianluca Brambilla (ITA)	Q36.5 Pro Cycling Team	+ 35"
5	Domenico Pozzovivo (ITA)	Israel–Premier Tech	+ 43"
6	Ben Healy (IRL)	EF Education–EasyPost	+ 44"
7	Mark Padun (UKR)	EF Education–EasyPost	+ 56"
8	Sean Quinn (USA)	EF Education–EasyPost	+ 1' 17"
9	Johannes Staune-Mittet (NOR)	Team Jumbo–Visma	+ 1' 19"
10	Natnael Tesfatsion (ERI)	Trek–Segafredo	+ 1' 30"

=== Stage 5 ===
25 March 2023 — Carpi to Carpi, 18.6 km (11.6 mi)(ITT)

Stage 5 Result (1–10)
Rank	Rider	Team	Time
1	Rémi Cavagna (FRA)	Soudal–Quick-Step	22' 12"
2	Michael Hepburn (AUS)	Team Jayco–AlUla	+ 18"
3	Ben Healy (IRL)	EF Education–EasyPost	+ 19"
4	Joel Suter (SUI)	Tudor Pro Cycling Team	+ 26"
5	Leo Hayter (GBR)	Ineos Grenadiers	+ 27"
6	Josef Černý (CZE)	Soudal–Quick-Step	+ 29"
7	Mathias Vacek (CZE)	Trek–Segafredo	+ 35"
8	Mauro Schmid (SUI)	Soudal–Quick-Step	+ 41"
9	Michael Leonard (CAN)	Ineos Grenadiers	+ 43"
10	James Shaw (GBR)	EF Education–EasyPost	+ 43"

General classification after Stage 5 (1–10)
Rank	Rider	Team	Time
1	Mauro Schmid (SUI)	Soudal–Quick-Step	16h 19' 55"
2	James Shaw (GBR)	EF Education–EasyPost	+ 16"
3	Ben Healy (IRL)	EF Education–EasyPost	+ 22"
4	Mark Padun (UKR)	EF Education–EasyPost	+ 1' 06"
5	Leo Hayter (GBR)	Ineos Grenadiers	+ 1' 19"
6	Domenico Pozzovivo (ITA)	Israel–Premier Tech	+ 1' 35"
7	Ben Zwiehoff (GER)	Bora–Hansgrohe	+ 1' 52"
8	Sean Quinn (USA)	EF Education–EasyPost	+ 1' 55"
9	Walter Calzoni (ITA)	Q36.5 Pro Cycling Team	+ 1' 57"
10	Gianluca Brambilla (ITA)	Q36.5 Pro Cycling Team	+ 2' 10"

== Classification leadership table ==
Classification leadership by stage
Stage	Winner	General classification	Points classification	Mountains classification	Young rider classification	Team classification
1	Rémi Cavagna	Rémi Cavagna	Rémi Cavagna	Didier Merchán	Rick Pluimers	Soudal–Quick-Step
2	Sean Quinn	Mauro Schmid	Mauro Schmid	Marco Murgano	Sean Quinn	EF Education–EasyPost
3	Ben Healy	Mauro Schmid	Mauro Schmid	Marco Murgano	Walter Calzoni	EF Education–EasyPost
4	Alexis Guérin	Mauro Schmid	Mauro Schmid	Alexis Guérin	Walter Calzoni	EF Education–EasyPost
5	Rémi Cavagna	Mauro Schmid	Mauro Schmid	Alexis Guérin	Ben Healy	EF Education–EasyPost
Final		Mauro Schmid	Mauro Schmid	Alexis Guérin	Ben Healy	EF Education–EasyPost

== Final classification standings ==
Legend
Denotes the winner of the general classification	Denotes the winner of the mountains classification
Denotes the winner of the points classification	Denotes the winner of the young rider classification

=== General classification ===
Final general classification (1–10)
Rank	Rider	Team	Time
1	Mauro Schmid (SUI)	Soudal–Quick-Step	16h 19' 55"
2	James Shaw (GBR)	EF Education–EasyPost	+ 16"
3	Ben Healy (IRL)	EF Education–EasyPost	+ 22"
4	Mark Padun (UKR)	EF Education–EasyPost	+ 1' 06"
5	Leo Hayter (GBR)	Ineos Grenadiers	+ 1' 19"
6	Domenico Pozzovivo (ITA)	Israel–Premier Tech	+ 1' 35"
7	Ben Zwiehoff (GER)	Bora–Hansgrohe	+ 1' 52"
8	Sean Quinn (USA)	EF Education–EasyPost	+ 1' 55"
9	Walter Calzoni (ITA)	Q36.5 Pro Cycling Team	+ 1' 57"
10	Gianluca Brambilla (ITA)	Q36.5 Pro Cycling Team	+ 2' 10"

=== Points classification ===
Final points classification (1–10)
Rank	Rider	Team	Points
1	Mauro Schmid (SUI)	Soudal–Quick-Step	28
2	Ben Healy (IRL)	EF Education–EasyPost	13
3	Domenico Pozzovivo (ITA)	Israel–Premier Tech	12
4	James Shaw (GBR)	EF Education–EasyPost	11
5	Rémi Cavagna (FRA)	Soudal–Quick-Step	10
6	Sean Quinn (USA)	EF Education–EasyPost	10
7	Alexis Guérin (FRA)	Bingoal WB	10
8	Walter Calzoni (ITA)	Q36.5 Pro Cycling Team	10
9	Mark Padun (UKR)	EF Education–EasyPost	7
10	Felix Engelhardt (GER)	Team Jayco–AlUla	7

=== Mountains classification ===
Final mountains classification (1–10)
Rank	Rider	Team	Points
1	Alexis Guerin (FRA)	Bingoal WB	28
2	Lennert Teugels (BEL)	Bingoal WB	24
3	Marco Murgano (ITA)	Team Corratec	23
4	Jhonatan Restrepo (COL)	GW Shimano–Sidermec	16
5	Ben Healy (IRL)	EF Education–EasyPost	14
6	Andrea Garosio (ITA)	Eolo–Kometa	12
7	Florian Lipowitz (GER)	Bora–Hansgrohe	10
8	Alessandro Fancellu (ITA)	Eolo–Kometa	10
9	Veljko Stojnić (SRB)	Team Corratec	8
10	Luca Covili (ITA)	Green Project–Bardiani–CSF–Faizanè	8

=== Young rider classification ===
Final young rider classification (1–10)
Rank	Rider	Team	Time
1	Ben Healy (IRL)	EF Education–EasyPost	16h 20' 17"
2	Leo Hayter (GBR)	Ineos Grenadiers	+ 57"
3	Sean Quinn (USA)	EF Education–EasyPost	+ 1' 33"
4	Walter Calzoni (ITA)	Q36.5 Pro Cycling Team	+ 1' 35"
5	Tijmen Graat (NED)	Team Jumbo–Visma	+ 1' 50"
6	Felix Engelhardt (GER)	Team Jayco–AlUla	+ 1' 59"
7	Johannes Staune-Mittet (NOR)	Team Jumbo–Visma	+ 2' 31"
8	Fernando Tercero (ESP)	Eolo–Kometa	+ 2' 46"
9	Davide Piganzoli (ITA)	Eolo–Kometa	+ 4' 43"
10	Florian Lipowitz (GER)	Bora–Hansgrohe	+ 5' 17"

=== Team classification ===
Final team classification (1–10)
Rank	Team	Time
1	EF Education–EasyPost	49h 00' 46"
2	Team Jumbo–Visma	+ 6' 30"
3	Green Project–Bardiani–CSF–Faizanè	+ 12' 10"
4	Soudal–Quick-Step	+ 13' 19"
5	Eolo–Kometa	+ 14' 34"
6	Israel–Premier Tech	+ 18' 03"
7	Trek–Segafredo	+ 20' 10"
8	Bingoal WB	+ 22' 29"
9	Bora–Hansgrohe	+ 34' 48"
10	Team Jayco–AlUla	+ 35' 44"
