= Mark Padun =

Ukrainian cyclist

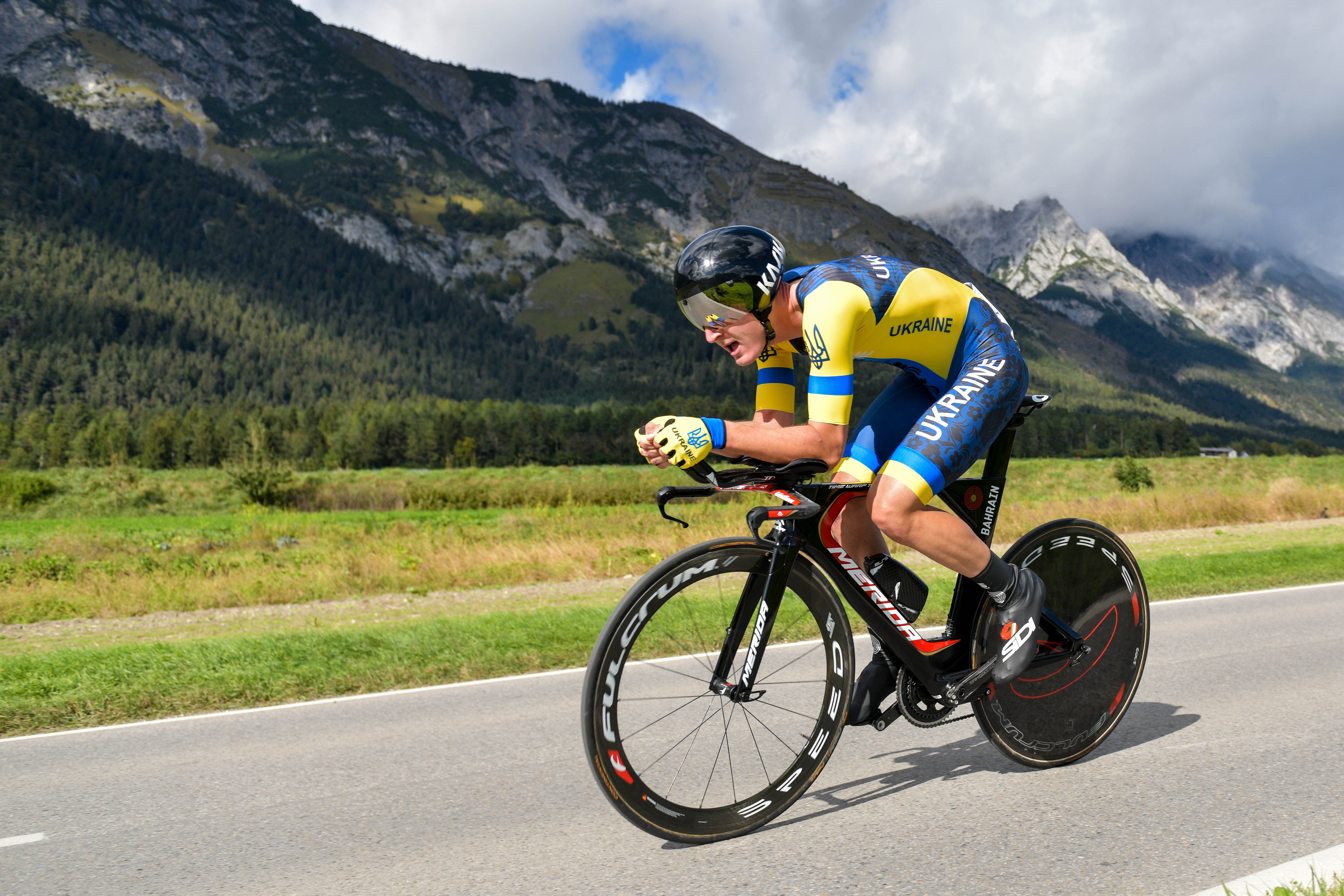
- Padun at the 2018 UCI Road World Championships

Personal information
- Full name: Mark Pavlovych Padun; Ukrainian: Марк Павлович Падун
- Born: 6 July 1996 (age 30) Donetsk, Ukraine
- Height: 1.82 m (6 ft 0 in)
- Weight: 64 kg (141 lb)

Cycling career
- Sport: Cycling
- Discipline: Road
- Role: Rider

Amateur teams
- 2015: Palazzago Fenice
- 2016–2017: Team Colpack
- 2017: Bahrain–Merida (stagiaire)

Professional teams
- 2018–2021: Bahrain–Merida
- 2022–2023: EF Education–EasyPost
- 2024: Team Corratec–Vini Fantini

Major wins
- One-day races and Classics National Time Trial Championships (2019)

Mark Pavlovych Padun (Ukrainian: Марк Павлович Падун; born 6 July 1996) is a former Ukrainian cyclist.

== Career ==
In the years 2016 and 2017, Mark Padun raced for Team Colpack. In 2017, he won a stage of the Giro Ciclistico d'Italia and after Matija Kvasina, winner of the 2017 Flèche du Sud, tested positive for EPO, Padun's second place was upgraded to first overall.

=== Bahrain–Merida (2018–2021) ===
In August 2017, Padun joined Bahrain–Merida as a stagiaire, and received a regular contract for the next season. In 2018 and 2019, he raced in the Vuelta a España. In 2019, he won the Ukrainian National Time Trial Championships. In October 2020, he raced in the Giro d'Italia and finished in second place on stage 12.

In 2021, Padun won Stages 7 and 8 of the Critérium du Dauphiné, after spending each day in the breakaway, while also collecting enough points to win the mountains classification. By dropping his companions in the breakaway and holding off the group of favorites on two consecutive days, these wins sparked sceptic commentary from riders and staff of other teams. The French newspaper Le Parisien published quotes calling his performance "an absolute disgrace" and that it "reminds us of the dirty 2000s". Despite his strong performance, he was not nominated for the Tour de France by his team, nor was he taken to the Men's individual road race at the delayed 2020 Summer Olympics by his federation, to the surprise of observers. In an interview with L'Équipe, he defended himself against doping suspicions, citing weight problems as reason for his inconsistent performances.

=== EF Education–EasyPost (2022–2023) ===
For the 2022 season, he signed a contract at EF Education–EasyPost. Team manager Jonathan Vaughters emphasised his trust in Padun, and justified it with "physiological tests" and "instinct". In February, Padun won stage 4 of O Gran Camiño, his first top ten in a time trial against an international field.

=== Team Corratec–Vini Fantini (2024) ===
He signed a one year contract with UCI ProTeam Team Corratec–Vini Fantini in January 2024.

Padun announced his retirement in January 2025.

== Major results ==
2014
1st Time trial, National Junior Road Championships
10th Overall Course de la Paix Juniors
2015
1st Criterium, National Road Championships
Giro della Regione Friuli Venezia Giulia

1st Mountains classification
1st Stage 3

8th Overall Course de la Paix U23
9th GP Capodarco
2016
1st Time trial, National Under-23 Road Championships
2nd Giro del Medio Brenta
3rd Overall Giro della Valle d'Aosta

1st Mountains classification
1st Young rider classification
1st Stage 2

3rd Overall Vuelta al Bidasoa
2017
1st Overall Flèche du Sud

1st Young rider classification

1st Trofeo Banca Popolare di Vicenza
1st GP Capodarco
5th Overall Giro Ciclistico d'Italia

1st Stage 3

2018
1st Stage 5 Tour of the Alps
5th Road race, UCI Road World Under-23 Championships
2019
1st Time trial, National Road Championships
1st Overall Adriatica Ionica Race

1st Young rider classification
1st Stage 3

2021
Critérium du Dauphiné

1st Mountains classification
1st Stages 7 & 8

3rd Overall Vuelta a Burgos
2022
3rd Overall O Gran Camiño

1st Stage 4 (ITT)

Combativity award Stage 6 Vuelta a España
2023
4th Overall Settimana Internazionale di Coppi e Bartali

=== Grand Tour general classification results timeline ===
Grand Tour	2018	2019	2020	2021	2022
Giro d'Italia	—	—	70	—	—
Tour de France	—	—	—	—	—
Vuelta a España	DNF	84	—	59	46

Legend
—	Did not compete
DNF	Did not finish
