= James Shaw (cyclist) =

British cyclist

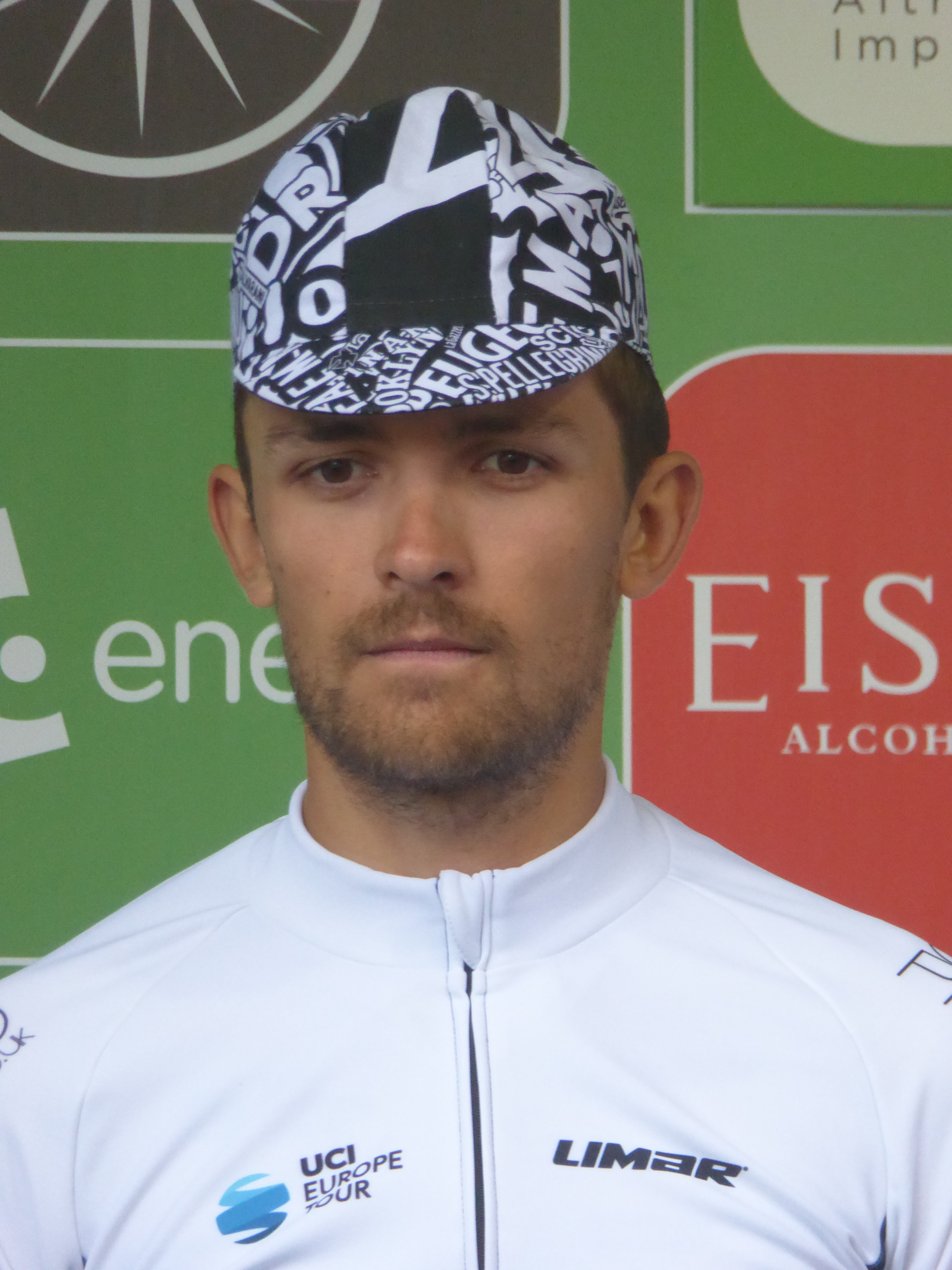
- Shaw at the 2019 Tour of Britain

Personal information
- Full name: James Callum Shaw
- Born: 13 June 1996 (age 30) Nottingham, United Kingdom
- Height: 1.79 m (5 ft 10 in)
- Weight: 63 kg (139 lb; 9.9 st)

Cycling career
- Sport: Cycling
- Current team: EF Education–EasyPost
- Discipline: Road
- Role: Rider
- Rider type: Puncheur

Amateur teams
- 2013–2014: Haribo–Beacon
- 2015–2016: Lotto–Soudal U23

Professional teams
- 2016: → Lotto–Soudal (stagiaire)
- 2017–2018: Lotto–Soudal
- 2019: SwiftCarbon Pro Cycling
- 2020: Riwal Readynez
- 2021: Ribble Weldtite
- 2022–: EF Education–EasyPost

James Callum Shaw (born 13 June 1996) is a British road racing cyclist, who rides for UCI WorldTeam EF Education–EasyPost. He previously rode for Belgian UCI WorldTeam Lotto–Soudal in 2017 and 2018, having come through their development team Lotto–Soudal U23, SwiftCarbon Pro Cycling in 2019, Riwal Securitas in 2020 and Ribble Weldtite in 2021.

== Career ==
=== Early life and amateur career ===
Shaw was born in Nottingham but grew up in the town of Heanor, Derbyshire. When he was six years old, he joined his first cycling club, Heanor Clarion. As a teenager riding for Haribo–Beacon, Shaw won the junior versions of both Kuurne–Brussels–Kuurne and Omloop Het Nieuwsblad. From this, he signed for the under-23 team of Lotto–Soudal, following in the footsteps of fellow British riders, Adam Blythe and Daniel McLay. In June 2016, Shaw came third in the Under-23 category of the British National Road Race Championships behind Tao Geoghegan Hart and Chris Lawless. He was then offered the chance to be a stagiaire for Lotto–Soudal from August onwards. After riding a couple of Belgian one-day races, Shaw was named as one of six riders for the Tour of Britain, his home tour.

=== Lotto Soudal (2017–2018) ===
Shaw signed a two-year professional contract with Lotto–Soudal from the start of the 2017 season, at the age of 20. Primarily used as a domestique, Shaw's best result over his two years with the team was a tenth-place finish in the under-23 road race at the 2018 UCI Road World Championships in Austria – while riding for Great Britain – and his contract was not renewed at the end of the season. In an interview with British cycling magazine Rouleur in October 2018, Shaw described turning professional at such an age as a "rash, young error".

=== Continental and ProTeam level (2019–2021) ===
Shaw remained without a team until February 2019, when he signed for British UCI Continental team SwiftCarbon Pro Cycling. He missed out on a podium finish at the Tour du Loir-et-Cher – finishing fourth overall – and was the top-placed Continental rider at the Tour de Yorkshire, finishing fifth overall. He finished third overall in the British National Road Series, winning two races during the season – the Tour of the Reservoir two-day race in June, and the Ryedale Grand Prix one-day race in August – and also rode for Great Britain at the test event for the Tokyo Olympics and the RideLondon–Surrey Classic. These performances earned Shaw a one-year contract with UCI ProTeam Riwal Readynez for the 2020 season.

During the 2020 season, Riwal Readynez encountered financial difficulties, and Shaw was not retained by the team beyond his initial contract. Thinking that he might have competed for the last time at the 2020 Brabantse Pijl, Shaw ultimately signed a one-year contract with British UCI Continental team Ribble Weldtite for the 2021 season. In successive starts, he took fifth-place overall finishes at the Tour of Slovenia and the Tour of Norway, both of which were 2.Pro races held as part of the UCI ProSeries. His final races with the team came at the British National Road Championships, finishing third in the time trial and ninth in the road race.

=== EF Education–EasyPost (2022–present) ===
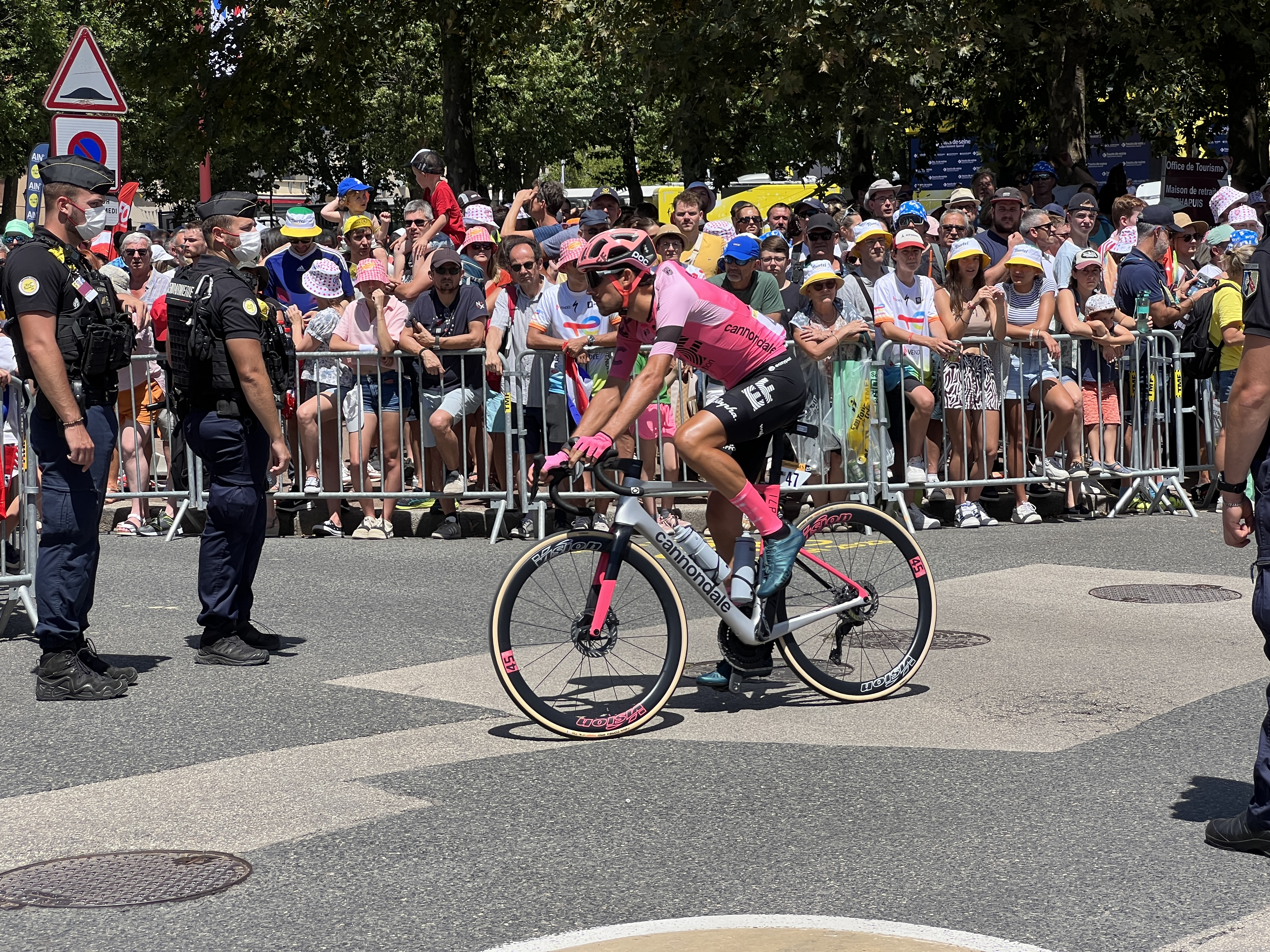
Shaw at the 2023 Tour de France, his first start at the race

After his pair of fifth-place overall finishes in 2021, he was contacted by Jonathan Vaughters, the CEO of UCI WorldTeam EF Education–Nippo; Shaw ultimately signed an initial two-year deal with the team to return to the UCI World Tour from 2022. He made his first start with the team at the Tour des Alpes-Maritimes et du Var, finishing ninth overall. After a second consecutive third-place finish at the British National Time Trial Championships, Shaw finished in fifth place overall at the Tour de Wallonie. He made his Grand Tour début at the Vuelta a España, featuring in three breakaways during the race, and recorded a best stage finish of ninth place on stage twelve. In 2023, Shaw finished second overall at the Settimana Internazionale di Coppi e Bartali, finishing sixteen seconds behind race winner Mauro Schmid. He made his début at the Tour de France later in the season, making it into the breakaways on stages six and thirteen respectively, recording a best result of fifth place on stage six. He ultimately withdrew from the race on stage fourteen following a crash, suffering a concussion in the process.

Having rode the Vuelta a España for the second time in his career in 2024, Shaw made his first start at the Giro d'Italia in 2025. Prior to the race, he finished in third place overall at the Région Pays de la Loire Tour, having gained time on the final stage with a second-place finish in Le Mans.

== Major results ==
2014
1st Kuurne–Brussels–Kuurne Juniores
1st Omloop Het Nieuwsblad voor Junioren
2016
3rd Road race, National Under-23 Road Championships
3rd Flèche Ardennaise
5th Liège–Bastogne–Liège Espoirs
10th Overall Tour de Normandie
10th Dwars door de Vlaamse Ardennen
2018
10th Road race, UCI Under-23 Road World Championships
2019
1st Overall Tour of the Reservoir

1st Stage 2

1st Ryedale GP
4th Overall Tour du Loir-et-Cher
5th Overall Tour de Yorkshire
10th Overall Szlakiem Walk Majora Hubala
10th Tokyo 2020 Test Event
2021
3rd Time trial, National Road Championships
5th Overall Tour of Norway
5th Overall Tour of Slovenia
2022
3rd Time trial, National Road Championships
5th Overall Tour de Wallonie (Note: In June 2024, Robert Stannard was stripped of all his race results recorded from August 2018 until August 2022, following a backdated four-year ban for an anti-doping violation. As a consequence, Shaw was retroactively promoted one position in the standings.)
9th Overall Tour des Alpes-Maritimes et du Var
2023
2nd Overall Settimana Internazionale di Coppi e Bartali
2025
3rd Overall Région Pays de la Loire Tour
2026
7th Overall Tour of Austria

=== Grand Tour general classification results timeline ===
Grand Tour	2022	2023	2024	2025	2026
Giro d'Italia	—	—	—	76	DNF
Tour de France	—	DNF	—	—	
Vuelta a España	87	—	98	66	

Legend
—	Did not compete
DNF	Did not finish
