= 2022 O Gran Camiño =

Spanish cycling race

2022 UCI Europe Tour

Race details
- Dates: 24–27 February 2022
- Stages: 4
- Distance: 506.8 km (314.9 mi)
- Winning time: 12h 35' 55"

Results
Jersey awarded to the overall winner	Winner	Alejandro Valverde (ESP)	(Movistar Team)
	Second	Michael Woods (CAN)	(Israel–Premier Tech)
	Third	Mark Padun (UKR)	(EF Education–EasyPost)
Jersey awarded to the points classification winner	Points	Alejandro Valverde (ESP)	(Movistar Team)
Jersey awarded to the mountains classification winner	Mountains	Iván Sosa (COL)	(Movistar Team)
Jersey awarded to the youth classification winner	Youth	Igor Arrieta (ESP)	(Equipo Kern Pharma)
	Team	(Spain) Movistar Team	

The 2022 O Gran Camiño (English: The Great Way) was a road cycling stage race that took place from 24 to 27 February 2022 in the autonomous community of Galicia in northwestern Spain. The race was rated as a category 2.1 event on the 2022 UCI Europe Tour calendar, and was the inaugural edition of O Gran Camiño.

== Teams ==
Four of the 18 UCI WorldTeams, eight UCI ProTeams, and five UCI Continental teams made up the 17 teams that participated in the race. All but three teams entered a full squad of seven riders; Cofidis, EF Education–EasyPost, and Human Powered Health each entered six riders. With one late non-starter, Atum General / Tavira / AP Maria Nova Hotel was reduced to six riders. In total, 115 riders started the race, of which 109 finished.

UCI WorldTeams

- Cofidis
- EF Education–EasyPost
- Israel–Premier Tech
- Movistar Team

UCI ProTeams

- Bardiani–CSF–Faizanè
- Burgos BH
- Caja Rural–Seguros RGA
- Drone Hopper–Androni Giocattoli
- Eolo–Kometa
- Equipo Kern Pharma
- Euskaltel–Euskadi
- Human Powered Health

UCI Continental Teams

- Atum General / Tavira / AP Maria Nova Hotel
- Efapel Cycling
- Manuela Fundación
- Rádio Popular–Paredes–Boavista
- W52 / FC Porto

== Route ==
Stage characteristics and winners
Stage	Date	Course	Distance	Type	Stage winner
1	24 February	O Porriño to Vigo	165 km (103 mi)	Hilly stage	Magnus Cort (DEN)
2	25 February	Bertamiráns to Mirador de Ézaro	177.6 km (110.4 mi)	Hilly stage	Michael Woods (CAN)
3	26 February	Maceda to Luintra	148.4 km (92.2 mi)	Mountain stage	Alejandro Valverde (ESP)
4	27 February	Sarria to Sarria	15.8 km (9.8 mi)	Individual time trial	Mark Padun (UKR)
Total			506.8 km (314.9 mi)		

== Stages ==
=== Stage 1 ===
24 February 2022 — O Porriño to Vigo, 165 km (103 mi)

Stage 1 Result (1–10)
Rank	Rider	Team	Time
1	Magnus Cort (DEN)	EF Education–EasyPost	3h 56' 59"
2	Giovanni Lonardi (ITA)	Eolo–Kometa	+ 0"
3	Alejandro Valverde (ESP)	Movistar Team	+ 0"
4	Orluis Aular (VEN)	Caja Rural–Seguros RGA	+ 0"
5	Daniel Freitas (POR)	Rádio Popular–Paredes–Boavista	+ 0"
6	Gonzalo Serrano (ESP)	Movistar Team	+ 0"
7	Fernando Barceló (ESP)	Caja Rural–Seguros RGA	+ 0"
8	Filippo Fiorelli (ITA)	Bardiani–CSF–Faizanè	+ 0"
9	Stephen Bassett (USA)	Human Powered Health	+ 0"
10	Delio Fernández (ESP)	Atum General / Tavira / AP Maria Nova Hotel	+ 0"

General classification after Stage 1 (1–10)
Rank	Rider	Team	Time
1	Magnus Cort (DEN)	EF Education–EasyPost	3h 56' 49"
2	Giovanni Lonardi (ITA)	Eolo–Kometa	+ 4"
3	Alejandro Valverde (ESP)	Movistar Team	+ 6"
4	José Gonçalves (POR)	W52 / FC Porto	+ 7"
5	Adrià Moreno (ESP)	Burgos BH	+ 7"
6	Rubén Fernández (ESP)	Cofidis	+ 8"
7	Antonio Angulo (ESP)	Euskaltel–Euskadi	+ 8"
8	Jetse Bol (NED)	Burgos BH	+ 9"
9	Jon Barrenetxea (ESP)	Caja Rural–Seguros RGA	+ 9"
10	Orluis Aular (VEN)	Caja Rural–Seguros RGA	+ 10"

=== Stage 2 ===
25 February 2022 — Bertamiráns to Mirador de Ézaro, 177.6 km (110.4 mi)

Stage 2 Result (1–10)
Rank	Rider	Team	Time
1	Michael Woods (CAN)	Israel–Premier Tech	4h 35' 52"
2	Alejandro Valverde (ESP)	Movistar Team	+ 16"
3	Rubén Fernández (ESP)	Cofidis	+ 37"
4	Iván Sosa (COL)	Movistar Team	+ 37"
5	Jakob Fuglsang (DEN)	Israel–Premier Tech	+ 39"
6	Jefferson Alexander Cepeda (ECU)	Drone Hopper–Androni Giocattoli	+ 39"
7	Delio Fernández (ESP)	Atum General / Tavira / AP Maria Nova Hotel	+ 42"
8	José Neves (POR)	W52 / FC Porto	+ 45"
9	Davide Villella (ITA)	Cofidis	+ 45"
10	Eduardo Sepúlveda (ARG)	Drone Hopper–Androni Giocattoli	+ 45"

General classification after Stage 2 (1–10)
Rank	Rider	Team	Time
1	Michael Woods (CAN)	Israel–Premier Tech	8h 32' 40"
2	Alejandro Valverde (ESP)	Movistar Team	+ 17"
3	Rubén Fernández (ESP)	Cofidis	+ 42"
4	Iván Sosa (COL)	Movistar Team	+ 48"
5	Jefferson Alexander Cepeda (ECU)	Drone Hopper–Androni Giocattoli	+ 50"
6	Jakob Fuglsang (DEN)	Israel–Premier Tech	+ 50"
7	Delio Fernández (ESP)	Atum General / Tavira / AP Maria Nova Hotel	+ 53"
8	Roger Adrià (ESP)	Equipo Kern Pharma	+ 56"
9	Filippo Zana (ITA)	Bardiani–CSF–Faizanè	+ 56"
10	José Neves (POR)	W52 / FC Porto	+ 56"

=== Stage 3 ===
26 February 2022 — Maceda to Luintra, 148.4 km (92.2 mi)

Stage 3 Result (1–10)
Rank	Rider	Team	Time
1	Alejandro Valverde (ESP)	Movistar Team	3h 42' 42"
2	Michael Woods (CAN)	Israel–Premier Tech	+ 0"
3	Iván Sosa (COL)	Movistar Team	+ 0"
4	Igor Arrieta (ESP)	Equipo Kern Pharma	+ 51"
5	Mark Padun (UKR)	EF Education–EasyPost	+ 51"
6	Ion Izagirre (ESP)	Cofidis	+ 51"
7	Rubén Fernández (ESP)	Cofidis	+ 51"
8	Filippo Zana (ITA)	Bardiani–CSF–Faizanè	+ 1' 31"
9	Urko Berrade (ESP)	Equipo Kern Pharma	+ 1' 31"
10	Jefferson Alveiro Cepeda (ECU)	Caja Rural–Seguros RGA	+ 1' 31"

General classification after Stage 3 (1–10)
Rank	Rider	Team	Time
1	Michael Woods (CAN)	Israel–Premier Tech	12h 15' 16"
2	Alejandro Valverde (ESP)	Movistar Team	+ 10"
3	Iván Sosa (COL)	Movistar Team	+ 50"
4	Rubén Fernández (ESP)	Cofidis	+ 1' 39"
5	Igor Arrieta (ESP)	Equipo Kern Pharma	+ 2' 07"
6	Mark Padun (UKR)	EF Education–EasyPost	+ 2' 09"
7	Ion Izagirre (ESP)	Cofidis	+ 2' 21"
8	Filippo Zana (ITA)	Bardiani–CSF–Faizanè	+ 2' 33"
9	Jefferson Alveiro Cepeda (ECU)	Caja Rural–Seguros RGA	+ 2' 33"
10	Urko Berrade (ESP)	Equipo Kern Pharma	+ 2' 52"

=== Stage 4 ===
27 February 2022 — Sarria to Sarria, 15.8 km (9.8 mi) (ITT)

Stage 4 Result (1–10)
Rank	Rider	Team	Time
1	Mark Padun (UKR)	EF Education–EasyPost	20' 19"
2	Jesús Herrada (ESP)	Cofidis	+ 5"
3	Alejandro Valverde (ESP)	Movistar Team	+ 10"
4	Ion Izagirre (ESP)	Cofidis	+ 10"
5	Derek Gee (CAN)	Israel–Premier Tech	+ 11"
6	José Neves (POR)	W52 / FC Porto	+ 16"
7	Nelson Oliveira (POR)	Movistar Team	+ 17"
8	Urko Berrade (ESP)	Equipo Kern Pharma	+ 22"
9	Carlos Canal (ESP)	Euskaltel–Euskadi	+ 26"
10	Michael Woods (CAN)	Israel–Premier Tech	+ 27"

General classification after Stage 4 (1–10)
Rank	Rider	Team	Time
1	Alejandro Valverde (ESP)	Movistar Team	12h 35' 55"
2	Michael Woods (CAN)	Israel–Premier Tech	+ 7"
3	Mark Padun (UKR)	EF Education–EasyPost	+ 1' 49"
4	Rubén Fernández (ESP)	Cofidis	+ 1' 55"
5	Iván Sosa (COL)	Movistar Team	+ 1' 57"
6	Ion Izagirre (ESP)	Cofidis	+ 2' 11"
7	Igor Arrieta (ESP)	Equipo Kern Pharma	+ 2' 35"
8	Urko Berrade (ESP)	Equipo Kern Pharma	+ 2' 54"
9	Jesús Herrada (ESP)	Cofidis	+ 3' 01"
10	Jakob Fuglsang (DEN)	Israel–Premier Tech	+ 3' 04"

== Classification leadership table ==
Classification leadership by stage
Stage	Winner	General classification	Points classification	Mountains classification	Young rider classification	Team classification	Combativity award
1	Magnus Cort	Magnus Cort	Magnus Cort	Jon Barrenetxea	Jon Barrenetxea	Movistar Team	Joaquim Silva
2	Michael Woods	Michael Woods	Antonio Angulo	Jon Barrenetxea	Filippo Zana	Israel–Premier Tech	Giovanni Visconti
3	Alejandro Valverde	Michael Woods	Alejandro Valverde	Iván Sosa	Igor Arrieta	Movistar Team	Carlos Canal
4	Mark Padun	Alejandro Valverde	Alejandro Valverde	Iván Sosa	Igor Arrieta	Movistar Team	Not awarded
Final		Alejandro Valverde	Alejandro Valverde	Iván Sosa	Igor Arrieta	Movistar Team	Not awarded

- On stage 2, Giovanni Lonardi, who was second in the points classification, wore the violet jersey, because first-placed Magnus Cort wore the yellow jersey as the leader of the general classification.
- On stage 2, Erik Fetter, who was second in the young rider classification, wore the white jersey, because first-placed Jon Barrenetxea wore the blue jersey as the leader of the mountains classification.

== Final classification standings ==
Legend
Denotes the winner of the general classification	Denotes the winner of the mountains classification
Denotes the winner of the points classification	Denotes the winner of the young rider classification

=== General classification ===
Final general classification (1–10)
Rank	Rider	Team	Time
1	Alejandro Valverde (ESP)	Movistar Team	12h 35' 55"
2	Michael Woods (CAN)	Israel–Premier Tech	+ 7"
3	Mark Padun (UKR)	EF Education–EasyPost	+ 1' 49"
4	Rubén Fernández (ESP)	Cofidis	+ 1' 55"
5	Iván Sosa (COL)	Movistar Team	+ 1' 57"
6	Ion Izagirre (ESP)	Cofidis	+ 2' 11"
7	Igor Arrieta (ESP)	Equipo Kern Pharma	+ 2' 35"
8	Urko Berrade (ESP)	Equipo Kern Pharma	+ 2' 54"
9	Jesús Herrada (ESP)	Cofidis	+ 3' 01"
10	Jakob Fuglsang (DEN)	Israel–Premier Tech	+ 3' 04"

=== Points classification ===
Final points classification (1–10)
Rank	Rider	Team	Points
1	Alejandro Valverde (ESP)	Movistar Team	119
2	Michael Woods (CAN)	Israel–Premier Tech	77
3	Antonio Angulo (ESP)	Euskaltel–Euskadi	77
4	Rubén Fernández (ESP)	Cofidis	56
5	Óscar Cabedo (ESP)	Burgos BH	49
6	Mark Padun (UKR)	EF Education–EasyPost	47
7	Iván Sosa (COL)	Movistar Team	41
8	Jetse Bol (NED)	Burgos BH	37
9	Ion Izagirre (ESP)	Cofidis	34
10	Jesús Herrada (ESP)	Cofidis	30

=== Mountains classification ===
Final mountains classification (1–10)
Rank	Rider	Team	Points
1	Iván Sosa (COL)	Movistar Team	20
2	Alejandro Valverde (ESP)	Movistar Team	13
3	Michael Woods (CAN)	Israel–Premier Tech	13
4	Jon Barrenetxea (ESP)	Caja Rural–Seguros RGA	8
5	Simon Geschke (GER)	Cofidis	5
6	Gorka Izagirre (ESP)	Movistar Team	4
7	Antonio Angulo (ESP)	Euskaltel–Euskadi	4
8	Derek Gee (CAN)	Israel–Premier Tech	3
9	Joaquim Silva (POR)	Efapel Cycling	3
10	Diego Camargo (COL)	EF Education–EasyPost	3

=== Young rider classification ===
Final young rider classification (1–10)
Rank	Rider	Team	Time
1	Igor Arrieta (ESP)	Equipo Kern Pharma	12h 38' 30"
2	Filippo Zana (ITA)	Bardiani–CSF–Faizanè	+ 51"
3	Alex Molenaar (NED)	Burgos BH	+ 2' 46"
4	Ibon Ruiz (ESP)	Equipo Kern Pharma	+ 9' 49"
5	Unai Iribar (ESP)	Euskaltel–Euskadi	+ 10' 20"
6	Carlos Canal (ESP)	Euskaltel–Euskadi	+ 12' 25"
7	Jon Barrenetxea (ESP)	Caja Rural–Seguros RGA	+ 17' 34"
8	Erik Fetter (HUN)	Eolo–Kometa	+ 17' 43"
9	Savva Novikov (RUS)	Equipo Kern Pharma	+ 18' 38"
10	Alessandro Fancellu (ITA)	Eolo–Kometa	+ 18' 57"

=== Team classification ===
Final team classification (1–10)
Rank	Team	Time
1	Movistar Team	37h 53' 08"
2	Cofidis	+ 1' 22"
3	Israel–Premier Tech	+ 4' 31"
4	Equipo Kern Pharma	+ 7' 33"
5	Caja Rural–Seguros RGA	+ 16' 11"
6	Drone Hopper–Androni Giocattoli	+ 20' 38"
7	Atum General / Tavira / AP Maria Nova Hotel	+ 23' 48"
8	Burgos BH	+ 25' 08"
9	Euskaltel–Euskadi	+ 28' 47"
10	Efapel Cycling	+ 28' 51"
