= Saint-Haon-le-Vieux =

- Commune
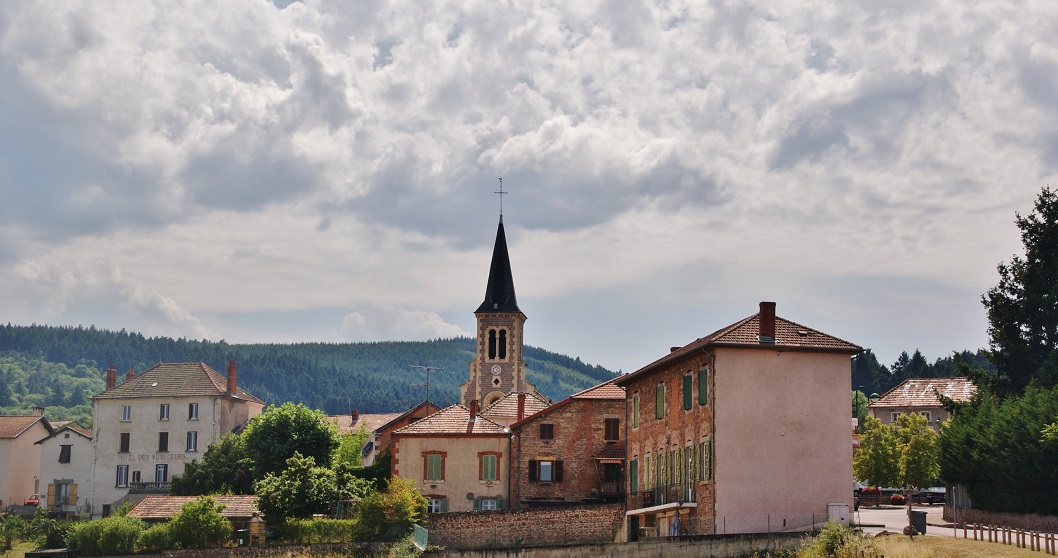

- Coat of arms
- Location of Saint-Haon-le-Vieux
- Location within France Location within Auvergne-Rhône-Alpes
- Coordinates: 46°04′32″N 3°54′32″E
- Country: France
- Region: Auvergne-Rhône-Alpes
- Department: Loire
- Arrondissement: Roanne
- Canton: Renaison
- Intercommunality: Roannais Agglomération

Government
  - Mayor (2020–2026): Gilles Goutaudier
- Area^{1}: 16.34 km^{2} (6.31 sq mi)
- Elevation: 400 m (1,300 ft)
- Highest elevation: 843 m (2,766 ft)
- Lowest elevation: 319 m (1,047 ft)
- Population (2023): 953
  - Density: 58.3/km^{2} (151/sq mi)
- Time zone: UTC+01:00 (CET)
  - Summer (DST): UTC+02:00 (CEST)
- INSEE/Postal code: 42233 /42370
- ^{1} French Land Register data, which excludes lakes, ponds, glaciers > 1 km^{2} (0.386 sq mi or 247 acres) and river estuaries.

Saint-Haon-le-Vieux (French pronunciation: [sɛ̃t‿ɑ̃ lə vjø]) is a commune in the Loire department in central France.

== Population ==
Historical population
Year	Pop.	±% p.a.
1968	596	—
1975	600	+0.10%
1982	745	+3.14%
1990	789	+0.72%
1999	810	+0.29%
2007	875	+0.97%
2012	930	+1.23%
2017	958	+0.60%
2023	953	−0.09%
Source: INSEE

== See also ==
- Communes of the Loire department
