= Sean Quinn (cyclist) =

American cyclist (born 2000)

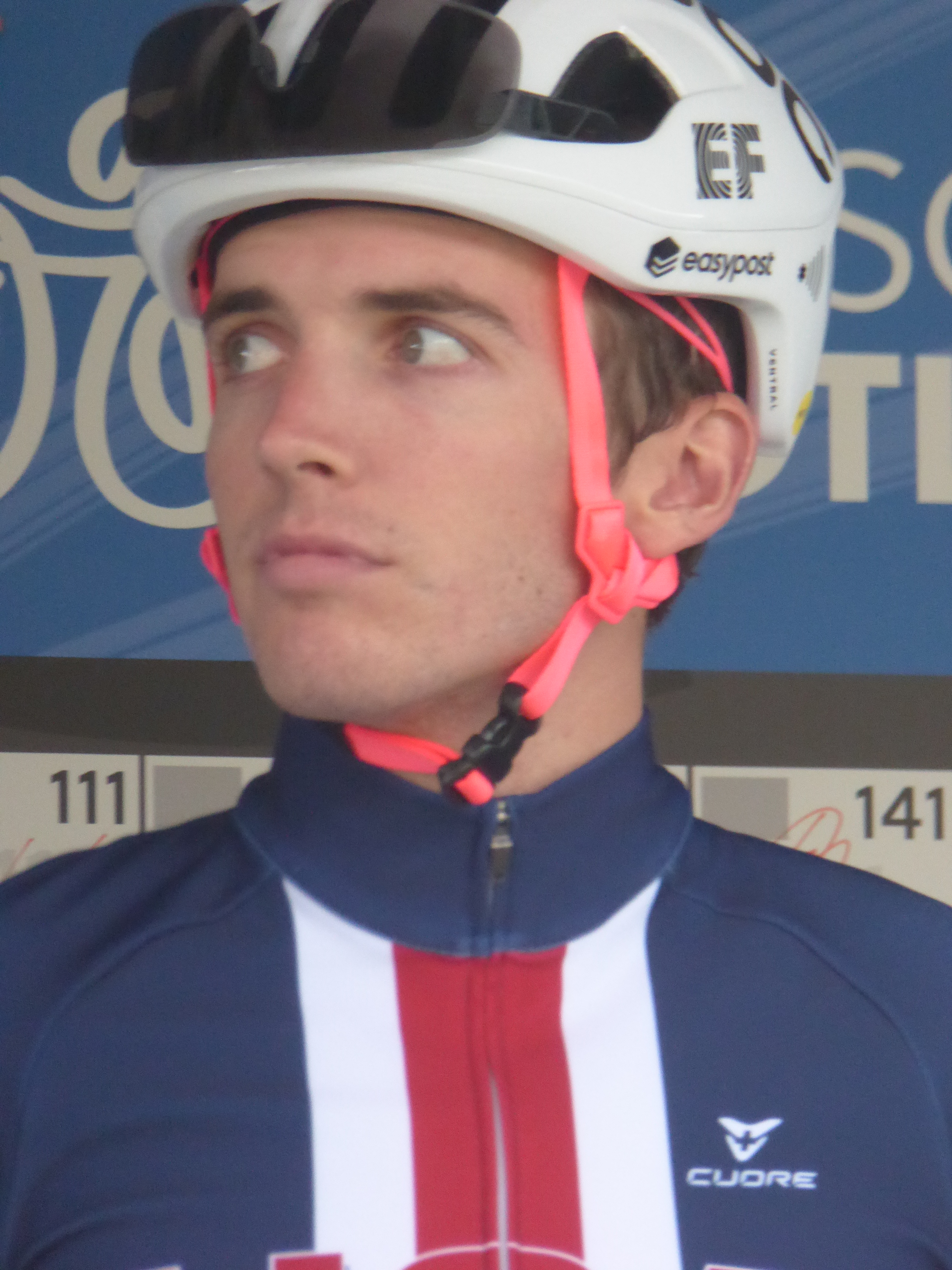
- Quinn at the 2023 UCI Road World Championships

Personal information
- Born: May 10, 2000 (age 26) Los Angeles, California, United States
- Height: 1.86 m (6 ft 1 in)
- Weight: 67 kg (148 lb)

Cycling career
- Sport: Cycling
- Current team: EF Education–EasyPost
- Discipline: Road
- Role: Rider

Amateur teams
- 2013–2015: Rokform
- 2016–2018: LUX–Stradling–Specialized

Professional teams
- 2019–2021: Hagens Berman Axeon
- 2020: Deceuninck–Quick-Step (stagiaire)
- 2022–: EF Education–EasyPost

Major wins
- One-day races and classics National Road Race Championships (2024)

Sean Quinn (born May 10, 2000) is an American professional road cyclist who currently rides for UCI WorldTeam EF Education–EasyPost.

Quinn was selected for the 2026 Tour de France. He came seventh on stage four, in the sprint from the breakaway group which made it to the line. Quinn was subsequently second in the general classification, 28 seconds behind Torstein Træen. He was dropped on the Col d'Aspin, and finished 31st on the stage, falling to 12th in the general classification, 9'35" down from the leader, Tadej Pogačar. He said of the stage, "I tried, and I can be proud of the effort, even though I'm not proud of the result."

In October 2026, Quinn extended his contract with EF Education–EasyPost for three more years.

== Personal life ==
Quinn speaks French.

== Major results ==
2017
5th Overall Tour du Pays de Vaud

1st Young rider classification

8th Overall Tour de l'Abitibi
2018
3rd Road race, National Junior Road Championships
6th Overall Tour de l'Abitibi
7th Overall Course de la Paix Juniors
7th Overall Tour du Pays de Vaud
9th Overall Saarland Trofeo
10th Road race, UCI Junior Road World Championships
2019
1st Stage 1 (ITT) Redlands Bicycle Classic
6th Overall Giro Ciclistico d'Italia
2021
1st Classica da Arrábida
1st Young rider classification, Volta ao Algarve
8th Overall Tour de Wallonie
2023 (1 pro win)
8th Overall Settimana Internazionale di Coppi e Bartali

1st Stage 2

10th Cadel Evans Great Ocean Road Race
2024 (1)
1st Road race, National Road Championships
2025
Vuelta a España

Combativity award Stages 3 & 4

=== Grand Tour general classification results timeline ===
| Grand Tour | 2023 | 2024 | 2025 | 2026 |
|---|---|---|---|---|
| Giro d'Italia | — | — | — | — |
| Tour de France | — | 78 | — | 19 |
| Vuelta a España | 80 | — | 75 | |

Legend
| — | Did not compete |
| DNF | Did not finish |
